= Karelian Proper language =

Dialect of the Karelian language

Karelian Proper
- Varšinaiskarjala
- Native to: Russia and Finland
- Region: White Karelia and parts of Olonets Karelia
- Language family: Uralic: Finnic; Northern Finnic; Karelian; Karelian Proper
- Dialects: North Karelian; South Karelian
- Writing system: Latin (Karelian alphabet)

Official status
- Recognised minority language in: Finland; Russia: Republic of Karelia

Language codes
- ISO 639-3: krl
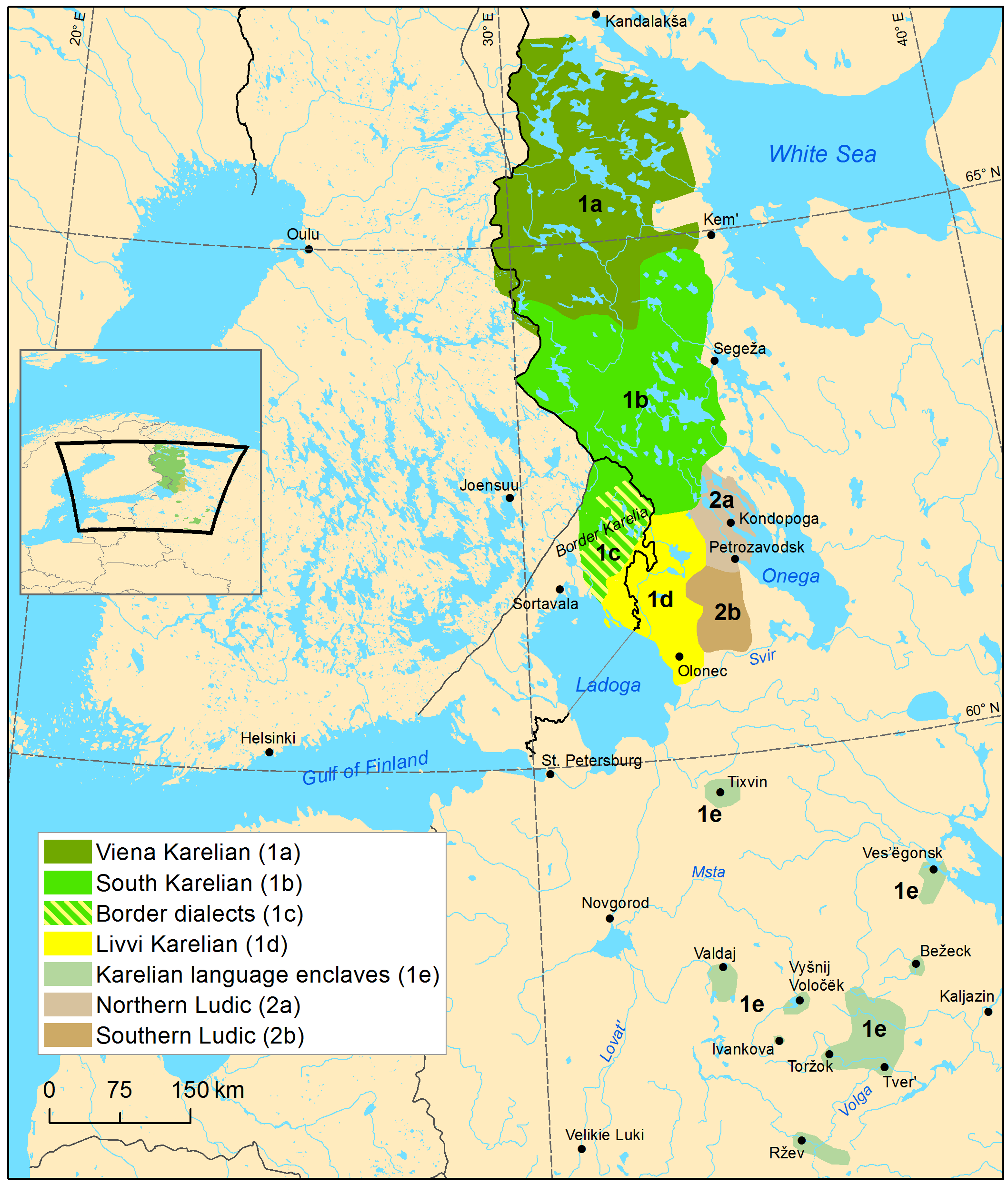
- Karelian Proper consists of 1a, 1b and 1e

Karelian Proper (Karelian Proper: varšinaiskarjala, varzinkarjala) is a supradialect of the Karelian language, which is a Finnic language. Karelian Proper is one of two or three Karelian dialects, along with Livvi-Karelian and Ludic. Karelian Proper is a direct descendent of the Old Karelian language, compared to Livvi-Karelian and Ludian supradialects which were formed through interactions between the Old Karelian and the Old Veps languages. Karelian Proper is situated in all of White Karelia and Central Karelia (parts of Olonets Karelia).

== Dialects ==
Karelian Proper is divided into two main dialects, which are Northern Karelian and South Karelian. The terms North and South Karelian are often avoided to avoid conflict with the Regions of Finland; North Karelia and South Karelia. Karelian Proper and most of its dialects are mostly mutually intelligible with the Finnish language, however Karelian Proper is not entirely mutually intelligible with Livvi-Karelian.

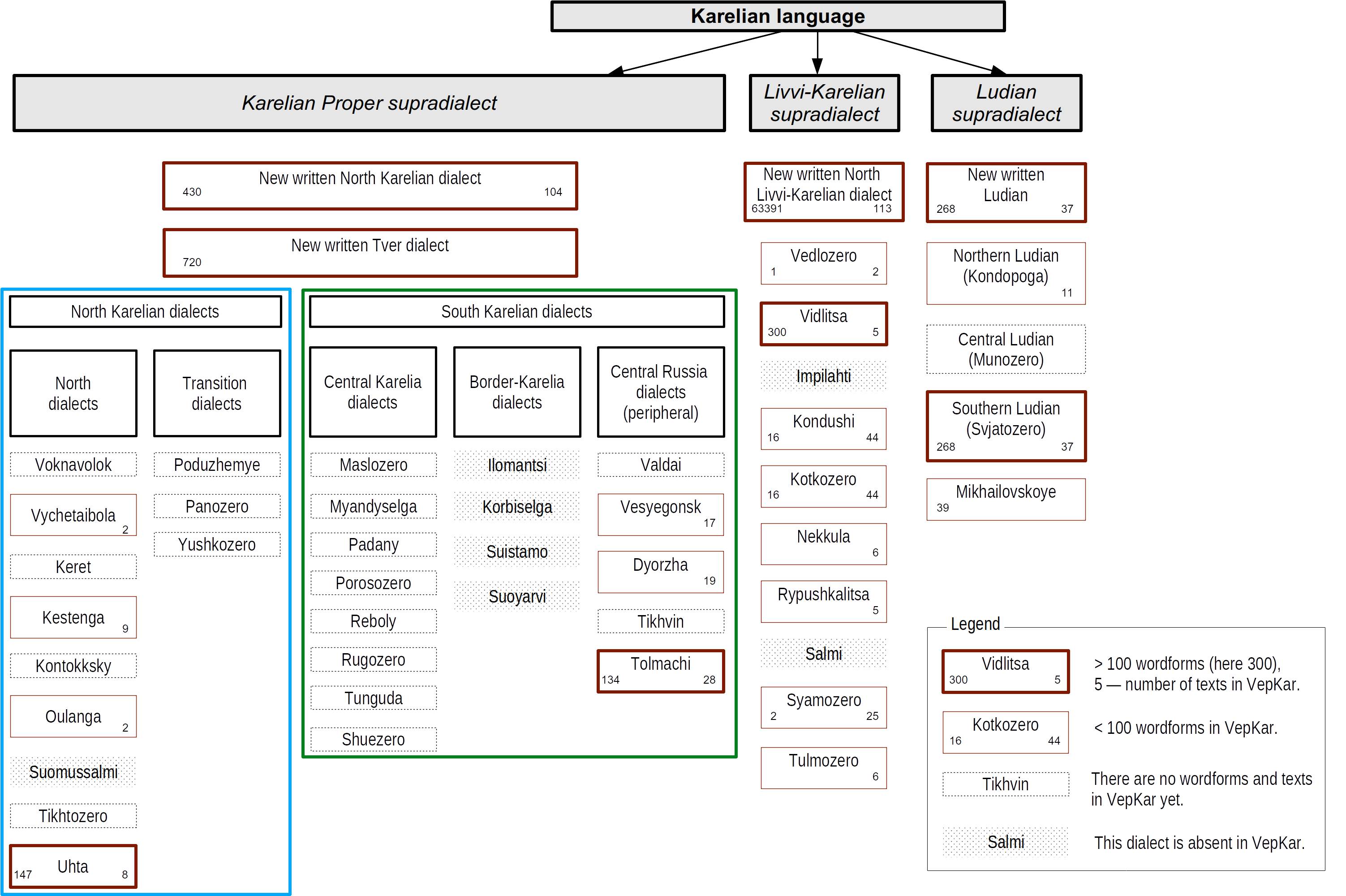
Scheme of dialects of the Karelian language includes Karelian Proper supradialect, Livvi-Karelian supradialect, Ludian supradialect.

- Karelian Proper
  - North Karelian (spoken in the parishes of Jyskyjärvi, Kieretti, Kiestinki, Kontokki, Oulanka, Paanajärvi, Pistojärvi, Suomussalmi, Uhtua, Usmana, Vitsataipale and Vuokkiniemi)
  - South Karelian (spoken in the parishes of Ilomantsi, Impilahti, Korpiselkä, Mäntyselkä, Paatene, Porajärvi, Repola, Rukajärvi, Suikujärvi, Suistamo, Suojärvi and Tunkua; and additionally in the enclaves of Tver, Tikhvin and Valday)
    - Tver Karelian
        - Dorža dialect
        - Maksuatiha dialect
        - Ruameška dialect
        - Tolmattšu dialect
        - Vesjegonsk (Vessi) dialect

=== White Sea Karelian ===
White Sea Karelian (North Karelian) is the second most spoken dialect of Karelian Proper, spoken in the northernmost parts of the Republic of Karelia and in Kuhmo, Finland. Within the Republic of Karelia it is mainly spoken in Kalevala, Kostomuksha and Loukhi. Within Finland, it is spoken in Suomussalmi. White Sea Karelian is the most mutually intelligible dialect of Karelian Proper to Finnish language speakers.

Example:

North Karelian	Finnish	English
Ennein vanhah karjalaiset varattih riähkyä.	Ennen vanhaan karjalaiset varoivat tekemästä syntiä.	In the old days, Karelians were careful not to sin.

=== South Karelian ===
South Karelian is the most spoken of the two dialects of Karelian Proper, and it is spoken in Central Karelia and Tver Karelian in Tver Oblast. South Karelian is spoken in Tunkua, Suikujärvi, Repola, Rukajärvi, Paatene, Mäntyselkä, Porajärvi, Ilomantsi, Korpiselkä, Suojärvi, Tver Karelia (Tver Oblast, Likhoslavl), Tihvinä, Valday, Suistamo and Impilahti.

Example:

South Karelian	Finnish	English
Terveh teillä kaikilla armahat rištikanzat!	Tervehdys teille kaikille rakkaat kuulijat!	Greetings to all you dear listeners!

== Phonology ==
=== Vowels ===
==== Diphthongs ====
	Front-harmonic			Neutral	Back-harmonic		
	Front+neutral	Front+front	Neutral+front	Neutral	Neutral+back	Back+neutral	Back+back
Open to close	äi	äy				ai	au
Mid to close	öi	öy	ey	ei	eu	oi	ou
Close	yi		iy		iu	ui	
Close to mid		yö		ie			uo
Close to open		yä	iä				ua

==== Triphthongs ====
	Front-harmonic			Neutral	Back-harmonic		
	Front+neutral	Front	Neutral+front	Neutral	Neutral+back	Back+neutral	Back
Close-mid-close		yöy	iey	iei	ieu	uoi	uou
Close-open-close	yäi	yäy	iäy			uai	uau

==== Consonants ====
Voiced consonants /b, d, ɡ, z, ʒ/ are found in loanwords in Karelian Proper. Palatalized consonants /dʲ lʲ nʲ rʲ sʲ tʲ/ (/zʲ/) are present in loanwords only in Karelian Proper. In South Karelian (Tver Karelian), /dʲ lʲ nʲ rʲ sʲ tʲ zʲ/ also exist in native words.

		Labial	Dental/ Alveolar	Postalv./ Palatal	Velar	Glottal
Nasal		m ⟨m⟩	n ⟨n⟩			
Plosive	voiceless	p ⟨p⟩	t ⟨t⟩		k ⟨k⟩	
Plosive	voiced	b ⟨b⟩	d ⟨d⟩		ɡ ⟨g⟩	
Affricate			(ts ⟨c⟩) (Note: The consonants /f/ and /ts/ are found in loanwords (except Ludic Karelian, which has /ts/ in native words). The consonants /b, d, ɡ, z, ʒ/ are found only in loanwords in Karelian Proper (North), but occur in native words in other varieties of Karelian.)	tʃ ⟨č⟩		
Fricative	voiceless	(f ⟨f⟩)	s ⟨s⟩	ʃ ⟨š⟩		h ⟨h⟩
Fricative	voiced	v ⟨v⟩	z ⟨z⟩	ʒ ⟨ž⟩		
Trill			r ⟨r⟩			
Approximant			l ⟨l⟩	j ⟨j⟩		

== Grammatical cases ==
Case system of Karelian Proper is extremely similar to the Finnish language and to other related Baltic-Finnic languages. These are the grammatical cases for food:

case	singular	plural
nom.	ruoga	ruogat
acc.	ruoga, ruogan	ruogat
gen.	ruogan	ruogin
par.	ruogua	ruogie
ess.	ruogana	ruogina
tra.	ruogakši	ruogiksi
ine.	ruogašša	ruogissa
abe.	ruogatta	ruogitta
ela.	ruogašta	ruogista
ade.-all.	ruogalla	ruogilla
abl.	ruogalda	ruogilda
com.	ruoganke, ruogineh	ruogineh, ruoginke
prol.	ruogačči	ruogičči
approx.	ruogalluo	ruogilluo

== Alphabet ==
Until the 1930s, Karelian had an official alphabet, and the Russian Cyrillic alphabet was used for sporadic publications. in 1930–31 a new Latin-based alphabet was developed.

Majuscule Forms (also called uppercase or capital letters)
A	B	Č	D	E	F	G	H	I	J	K	L	M	N	O	P	R	S	Š	Z	Ž	T	U	V	Y	Ä	Ö	ʼ
Minuscule Forms (also called lowercase or small letters)
a	b	č	d	e	f	g	h	i	j	k	l	m	n	o	p	r	s	š	z	ž	t	u	v	y	ä	ö	ʼ

In 2007, the current Karelian alphabet was approved in the Republic of Karelia, making it a uniform script for all Karelian languages. This unified alphabet was introduced as a replacement to deal with the separate Olonets Karelian and Karelian Proper alphabets. The main difference between the two alphabets is the inclusion of the letter C.

Majuscule Forms (also called uppercase or capital letters)
A	B	C	Č	D	E	F	G	H	I	J	K	L	M	N	O	P	R	S	Š	Z	Ž	T	U	V	Y	Ä	Ö	ʼ
Minuscule Forms (also called lowercase or small letters)
a	b	c	č	d	e	f	g	h	i	j	k	l	m	n	o	p	r	s	š	z	ž	t	u	v	y	ä	ö	ʼ

=== Letter names and IPA ===
Letter	Letter name	IPA
A	aa	/ɑ/
B	bee	/b/
C	cee	/ts/
Č	čee	/tʃ/
D	dee	/d/
E	ee	/e/
F	ef	/f/
G	gee	/ɡ/
H	hoo	/h/
I	ii	/i/
J	jii	/j/
K	koo	/k/
L	el	/l/
M	em	/m/
N	en	/n/
O	oo	/o/
P	pee	/p/
R	er	/r/
S	es	/s/
Š	šee	/ʃ/
Z	zee	/z/
Ž	žee	/ʒ/
T	tee	/t/
U	uu	/u/
V	vee	/v/
Y	yy	/y/
Ä	ää	/æ/
Ö	öö	/ø/
ʼ	pehmennyšmerkki	/ʲ/
