= Tver Karelian dialect =

Dialect of Karelian

Tver Karelian
- Tverin karielan kieli
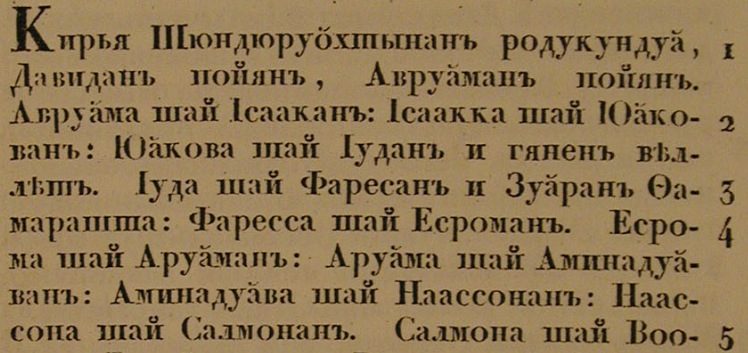
- Gospel of Matthew in Tver Karelian, 1820
- Native to: Russia
- Region: Tver Oblast
- Ethnicity: Tver Karelians
- Extinct: serious threat of extinction
- Language family: Uralic: Finnic; Ladogan?; Karelian; Karelian Proper; Southern Karelian; Tver Karelian

Language codes
- ISO 639-3: –
- Glottolog: tver1240 Tver
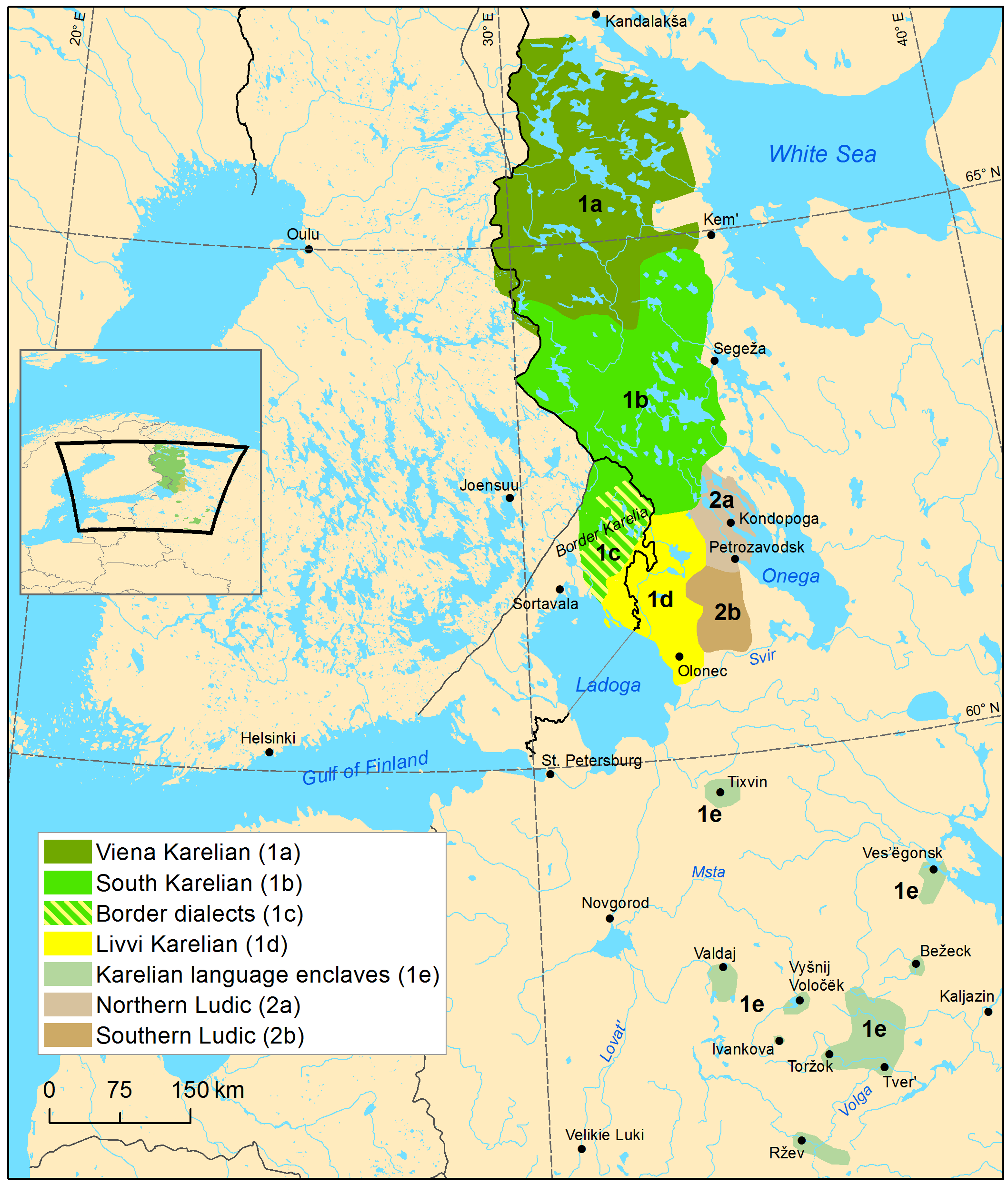
- Spread of Karelian in the 20th century.

The Tver Karelian dialect is a dialect of the Karelian language spoken in the Tver Oblast. It is descended from 17th century South Karelian speakers who migrated to the Tver region.

Although Tver Karelian descents from Karelian Proper, it often contains many differences from other Karelian Proper dialects. The Tver Karelian dialect contains very strong influences from the Russian language, especially in the phonetics of the dialect.

A standardized written language has been created for the Tver dialect. The earliest translation of the Bible in Karelian was made using the Tver dialect in 1820.

== Examples ==
The following example of Tver Karelian is from Zoja Turičeva in 1996:

Irina Novak speaks about the Karelian language and Karelians. Irina talks in Тolmachevsky dialect (Tolmachevsky dialect is one of the three Tver Karelian dialects, it is one of the Karelian Proper dialects). KarRC RAS, 2018. See subtitles in Karelian language.

Tver Karelian	Finnish	English
Puasinkoi on pieni karielan külä Tverin mualla. Šielä on nel’l’äkümmendä taluo. Šeizov külä joven rannalla. Jogi virduav hil’l’ah, žentän händä šanotah Tihvinča. Ümbäri on ülen šoma mua. – Tuatto šaneli: ammuin, monda šadua vuotta ennen, šinne tuldih Pohjois-Karielašta karielan rahvaš. Hüö leikkattih mečän i šeizatettih tämän külän. I nüt vielä küläššä šeizotah kojit, kumbazet on luaittu vanhašta mečäštä.	Puasinkoi on pieni karjalainen kylä Tverin alueella. Siellä on neljäkymmentä taloa. Kylä on joen rannalla. Joki virtaa hiljaa, siksi sitä sanotaan Tihvinitšaksi. Ympärillä on hyvin kaunista seutua. – Isä kertoi: muinoin, monta sataa vuotta sitten, sinne tuli Pohjois-Karjalasta karjalaisia. He hakkasivat metsän ja pystyttivät tämän kylän. Ja vielä nyt kylässä on taloja, jotka on rakennettu vanhan metsän hirsistä.	Puasinkoi is a small Karelian village in the Tver region. There are forty houses. The village is on the riverbank. The river flows quietly, which is why it is called Tihvinitša. The surrounding area is very beautiful. – My father told me: a long time ago, many hundreds of years ago, Karelians came from Northern Karelia to that place. They cleared the forest and created this village. And even today, there are some houses in the village that are built from the logs of the old forest.
