= Tver Karelia =

Area of the Tver Oblast, Russia

Tver Karelia (Karelian, Tver dialect: Tverin Kariela; Karelian, standard: Tverin Karjala; Russian: Тверска́я Каре́лия, romanized: Tverskaya Kareliya) is the area inside the Tver Oblast that is inhabited by Karelians.

== Geography ==
Refugees from the Korelsky uyezd of the Vodskaya pyatina settled on the palace (state) lands of the Upper Bezhetsk and other parts of the Bezhetskaya pyatina, which were deserted due to the turmoil and oppression of the Time of Troubles; historically, these territories made up Tver Karelia. By the beginning of the 20th century, the largest number of Tver Karelians lived in Bezhetsky, Vesyegonsky, Vyshnevolotsky, Novotorzhsky, partly in Tversky, Zubtsovsky, Kashinsky uyezds. According to the 1926 census, the Tver Karelians numbered 140,567 people, of which more than 95% spoke the Karelian language.

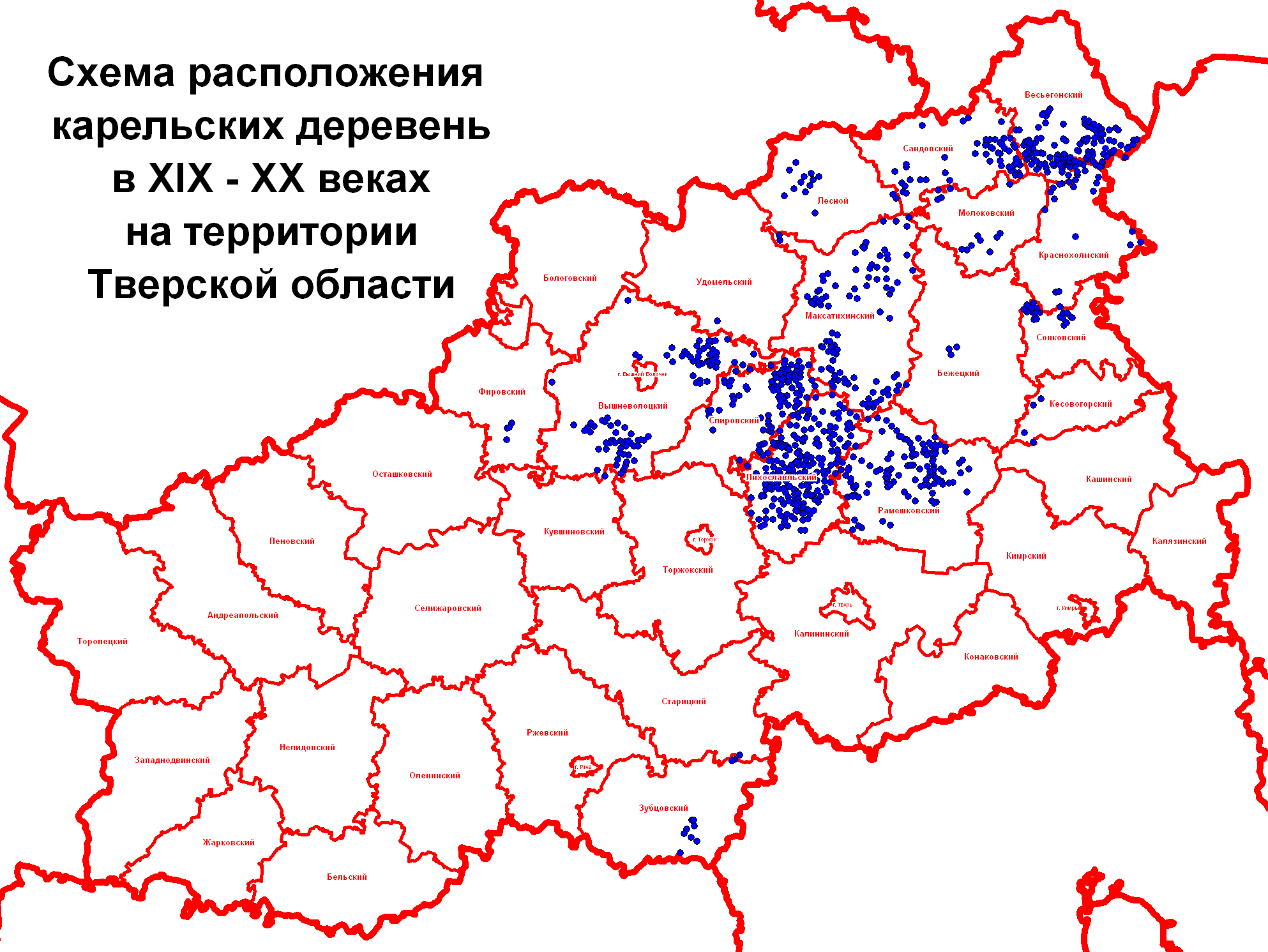
Karelian villages of the Tver oblast

In 1930, according to the statistical collection of the Moscow Oblast Executive Committee (at that time the eastern part of the former Tver province was part of the Moscow region), Karelians lived in the following districts:

District	Number of Tver Karelians	Percentage as the district's total population
Vesyegonsky	13,017	25.08%
Krasnokholmsky	4,420	7%
Lesnoy	3,152	14%
Likhoslavlsky	23,035	56%
Maksatikhinsky	28,895	45%
Molokovsky	1,552	2%
Rameshkovsky	24,550	45%
Sonkovsky	4,027	8%
Spirovsky	11,181	33%
Tolmachevsky	24,469	95%

In total, there were 150,617 Karelians in the region in 1930.

According to the censuses in the Kalinin region, there were these many Karelians:

- 1970 - 38,064
- 1979 - 30,387
- 1989 - 23,169

According to the 2002 census, there were 14,633 Tver Karelians in the Tver oblast.

=== Karelian villages ===
The resettlement of the Karelians to the Tver land was carried out by the Moscow government in an organized manner, the places intended for the settlement of the Karelians were examined in advance, it was indicated how many families could be settled. The Karelians settled mainly in the wastelands (that is, in the place of desolate villages), the original Russian names were usually retained. In the 19th and early 20th centuries, new villages (settlements) and farms appeared.

Karelian villages predominate in the Likhoslavl region, constituting a significant part in the Maksatikhinsky, Rameshkovsky, Spirovsky and Vesyegonsky districts. Now in most of them the population is mixed or Russian.

The largest Karelian settlements are: Tolmachi, Mikshino, Kozlovo, Alyoshino (Rameshkovsky District), Nikolskoe (Rameshkovsky District), Trestna. The town of Likhoslavl emerged on the site of the Karelian villages of Ostashkovo and Likhoslavl.

== Population ==
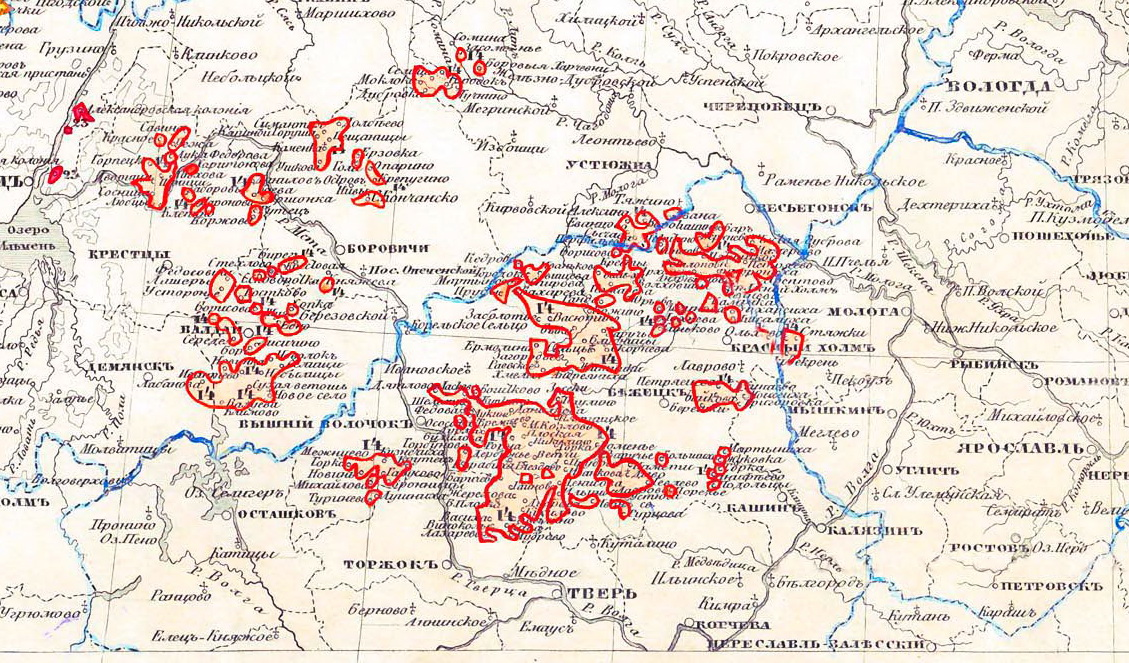
Fragment of the Ethnographic map of European Russia by Peter von Köppen, 1851. Areas of settlement of the Karelians are highlighted in Tver Governorate (No. 14).

The formation of Tver Karelia is associated with the mass resettlement of Karelians from their original places of residence on the Karelian Isthmus and in the Northern Ladoga area to the empty palace lands of the Bezhetsk upper in the second half of the 16th — first quarter of the 18th centuries. Deprived of ties with their fellow tribesmen in Olonets and White Sea Karelia, Tver Karelians eventually separated into a separate subethnos of Karelians, speaking a special Tver dialect of the Karelian language.

== History ==
=== Karelian National Okrug ===
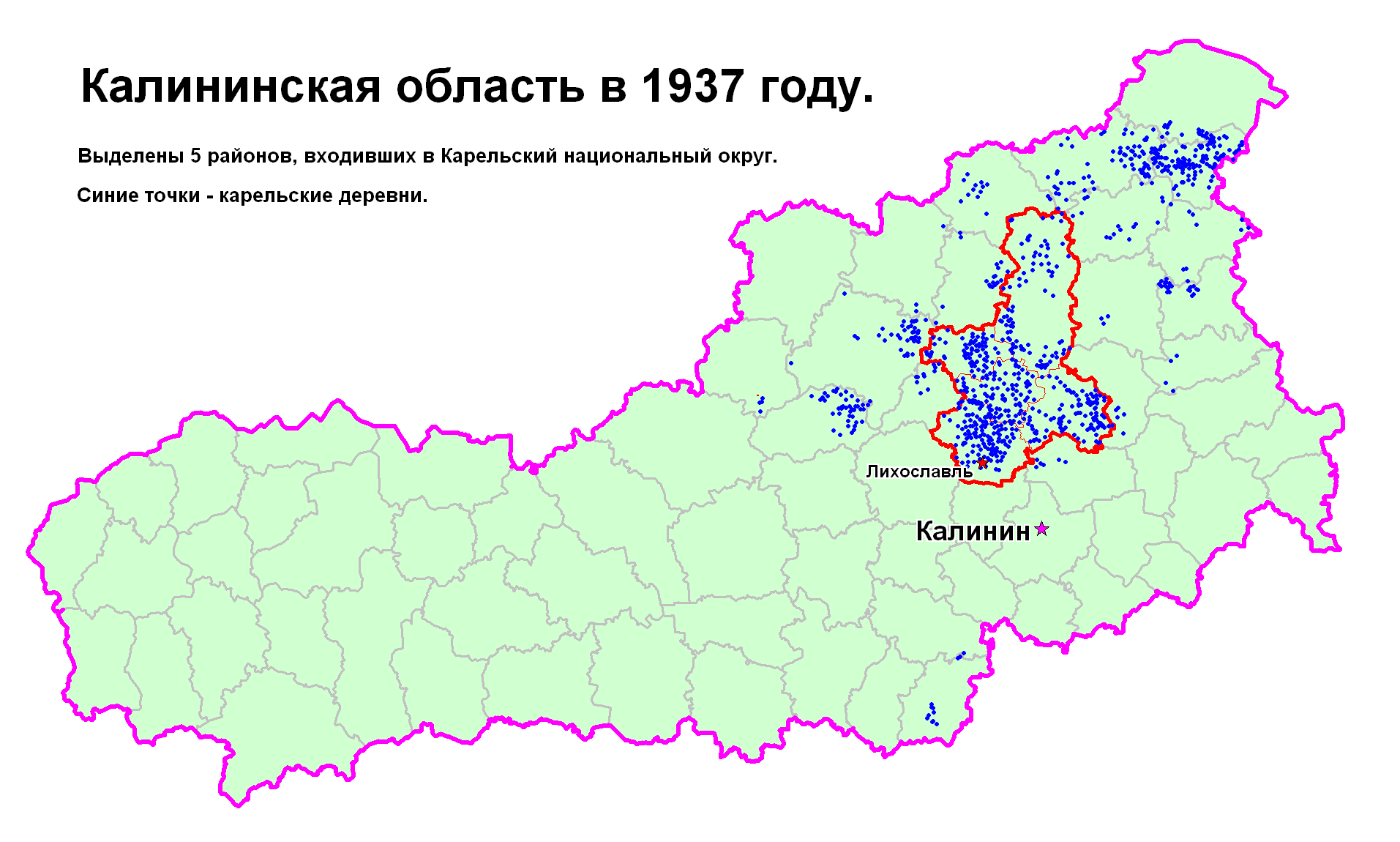
Karelian National Okrug on the map of Kalinin Oblast (modern Tver Oblast)

On July 8, 1937, on the territory of the compact settlement of the Tver Karelians, the Karelian National Okrug was created, consisting of three already existing and two newly created districts: Likhoslavl, Novokarelsky, Rameshkovsky, Maksatikhinsky, Kozlovsky. The capital of the district was the city of Likhoslavl. During the first year of the Okrug's existence, many Karelian cultural and educational institutions were created, but on February 25, 1939, it ceased to exist, and many activists of the Karelian movement in the Tver region were repressed.

=== Tver national-cultural autonomy of Tver Karelians ===
In 1997, the Tver national-cultural autonomy of the Tver Karelians was formed, which is a public association of citizens of this nationality on the basis of voluntary self-organization in order to resolve issues of preserving identity, developing their native language, education, and national culture. Includes six regional and one urban cultural autonomy.

== Bibliography ==
- Глинка Ф. Н., О древностях в Тверской Карелии. Извлеч. из писем Ф. Н. Глинки к П. И. Кеппену — 1836.
