= Blokland (surname) =

Blokland or Van Blokland is a Dutch toponymic surname indicating an origin in either Blokland, Utrecht, Hoogblokland, Laagblokland or Blokland, South Holland. People with the surname include:

- Frank E. Blokland (born 1959), Dutch typeface designer and founder of the Dutch Type Library company
- Hans Blokland (politician) (born 1943), Dutch politician and MEP
- Hans T. Blokland (born 1960), Dutch social and political theorist
- Jenny Blokland (born c.1958), Australian Northern Territory Supreme Court judge
- Rogier Blokland (born 1971), Dutch linguist and Professor of Finno-Ugric languages
- Talja Blokland (born 1971), Dutch social scientist and urban researcher in Berlin

Van Blokland

- Erik van Blokland (born 1967), Dutch typeface designer, educator and computer programmer
- Petr van Blokland (born 1956), Dutch graphic and typeface designer

Beelaerts van Blokland

- Gerard Jacob Theodoor Beelaerts van Blokland (1843–1897), Speaker of the Dutch House of Representatives and envoy for the South African Republic
- Frans Beelaerts van Blokland (1872–1956), Dutch politician and diplomat
- Pieter Beelaerts van Blokland (1932–2021), Dutch CDA politician, Ministers of Housing and Spatial Planning 1977–81
