= Blokland =

Blokland may refer to:

- Blokland (surname), including "Van Blokland"
- Blokland, South Holland, a village in the Netherlands
- Blokland, Utrecht, a village in the Netherlands

== See also ==
- Hoogblokland, a village and former municipality in South Holland
- Laagblokland, a village and former municipality in South Holland
- Blockland (disambiguation)
