= Rogier Blokland =

Dutch linguist

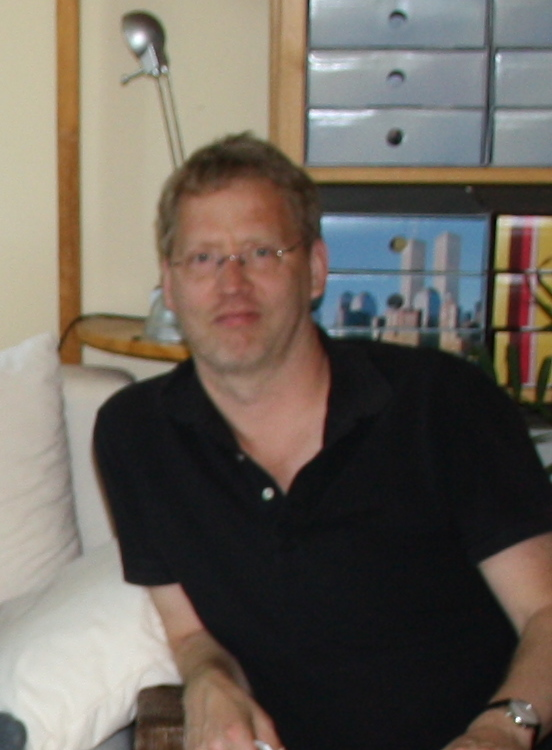

Rogier Philip Charles Eduard Blokland (born February 16, 1971, in Dordrecht) is a Dutch linguist and Professor of Finno-Ugric languages at Uppsala University.

== Life and Research ==
Blokland studied at the University of Groningen, where he completed his master's degree in 1997, and received his Doctorate under the supervision of Cornelius Hasselblatt. After his studies, he held posts as docent, visiting docent and research and teaching fellow at various universities, including Tallinn University, the University of Tartu, the University of Greifswald and the Humboldt University of Berlin.

From 2005 to 2006, Blokland worked with professor Cornelius Hasselblatt at the department of Finno-Ugric Languages and Cultures in Groningen, and from 2009 to 2010 he was acting professor of Finno-Ugric and Uralic Studies (formerly Eugene Helimski) at the University of Hamburg. In 2011, he took the position of Assistant Professor at the Chair of Finno-Ugric Studies (Elena Skribnik) at LMU Munich.

In 2014, Rogier Blokland was appointed as Professor of Finno-Ugric languages at the Department of Modern Languages at Uppsala University, a position previously held by Lars-Gunnar Larsson.

Blokland's research focuses on the Baltic-Finnic, the Permic and the Sámi languages, and he is particularly interested in the areas of language documentation and language contact of small and highly endangered varieties.

== Publications (selected) ==
Monographs

- 2009 The Russian loanwords in literary Estonian. Wiesbaden

Editions

- 2007 Language and Identity in the Finno-Ugric World. Maastricht (with Cornelius Hasselblatt)
- 2002 Finno-Ugrians and Indo-Europeans: Linguistic and Literary Contacts. Maastricht (with Cornelius Hasselblatt)

Articles

- 2015 Negation in South Saami. Negation in Uralic languages, ed. by Matti Miestamo, Anne Tamm, Beáta Wagner-Nagy. Benjamins. 377–398. (with Nobufumi Inaba)
- 2012 Borrowed pronouns: evidence from Uralic. Finnisch-ugrische Mitteilungen 35: 1–35.
- 2011 Komi-Saami-Russian contacts on the Kola Peninsula. Language Contact in Times of Globalization, edited by Cornelius Hasselblatt, Peter Houtzagers & Remco van Pareren. Amsterdam & New York. 5–26 (with Michael Rießler)
- 2010 Vene mõju eesti keeles. Keele rajad. Pühendusteos professor Helle Metslangi 60. sünnipäevaks, edited by Ilona Tragel. Tartu. 35–54 (with Petar Kehayov)
- 2003 The endangered Uralic languages. Language Death and Language Maintenance. Theoretical, practical and descriptive approaches, edited by Mark Janse & Sijmen Tol. Amsterdam. 107–141 (with Cornelius Hasselblatt)
- 2002 Phonotactics and Estonian etymology. Finno-Ugrians and Indo-Europeans. Linguistic and Literary Contacts, edited by Rogier Blokland & Cornelius Hasselblatt. Maastricht. 46–50.
- 2000 Allative, genitive and partitive. On the dative in Old Finnish. Congressus Nonus Internationalis Fenno-Ugristarum IV. Tartu. 421–431 (with Nobufumi Inaba)
