= Northeastern coastal Estonian =

Dialect of Estonian language

Northeastern Coastal Estonian
- kirderannikumurre kirderanniku
- Native to: Estonia
- Region: northeastern coast from Tallinn to Narva river
- Language family: Uralic: Finno-Ugric?; Finnic; Northern Finnic; Northeastern Coastal Estonian

Language codes
- ISO 639-3: –
- Glottolog: nort2406 Northeastern Coastal Estonian
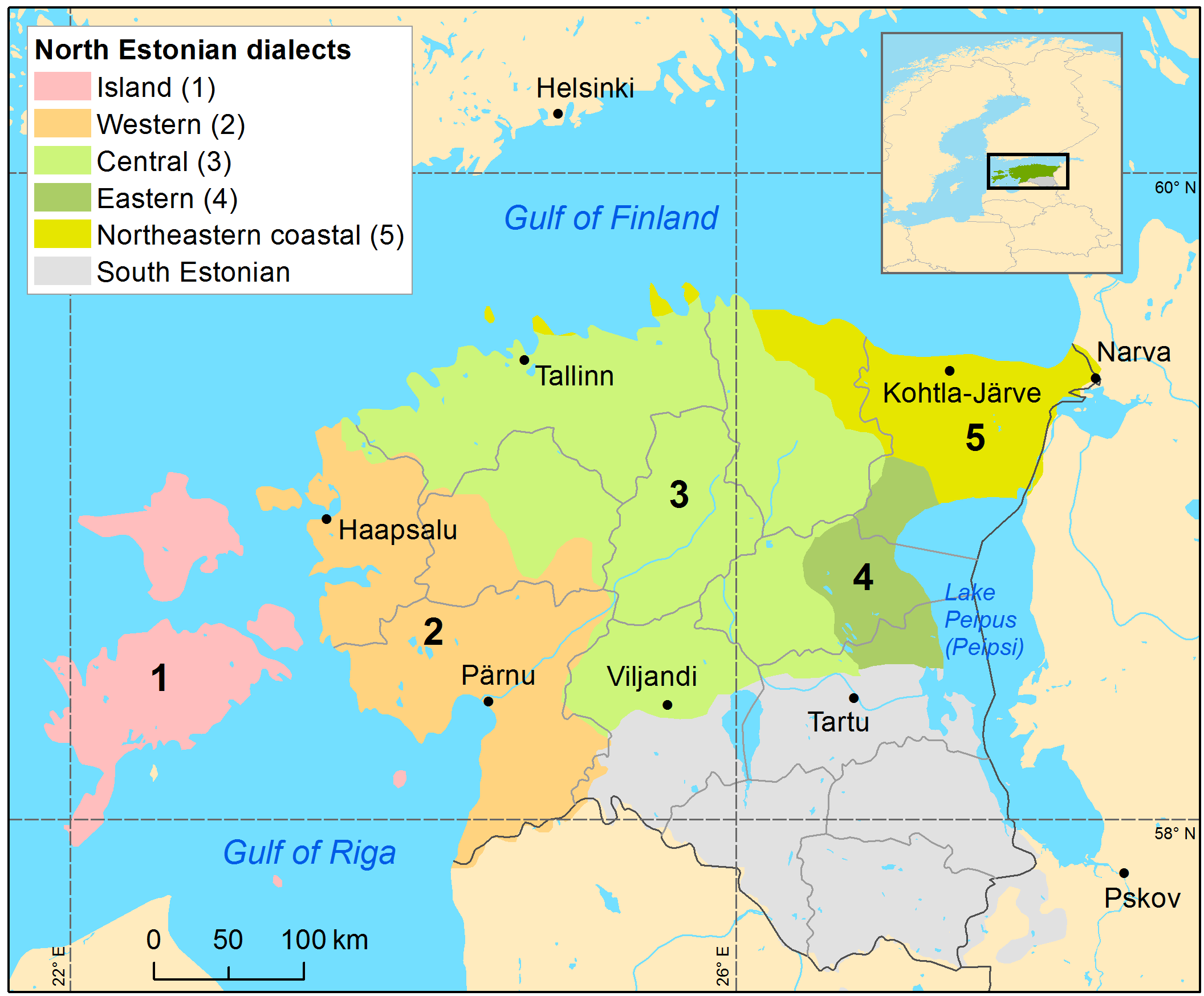
- Northeastern coastal Estonian

The northeastern coastal dialect (Estonian: kirderannikumurre) is a Finnic dialect (or dialect group) traditionally considered part of the Estonian language. The Estonian coastal dialects were spoken on the coastal strip of Estonia from Tallinn to the Narva river. It has very few speakers left.

Treating the northeastern coastal dialect as a single unit dates back to Arnold Kask's classification of Estonian dialects from the year 1956. According to some authors, the coastal dialects form one of the three major dialect groups of Estonian (the other two being North Estonian and South Estonian).

== Features ==
The characteristics of the dialect group are mostly shared with the Northern Finnic languages.

- There are remnants of vowel harmony (räbälä 'rag' (genitive case), cf. Standard Estonian räbala)
- There is no palatalization
- Short plosives are unvoiced unlike in other dialects of Estonian (mägi, cf. Finnish mäki)
- Recent quantitative changes in consonant gradation are absent (silm [silːm] : silmad [silːmɑd̥], cf. Standard Estonian [silːm] : [silmɑd̥], 'eye' : 'eyes')
- The negative verb inflects for person and number: en, et, ei, emma, etta, evad. Cf. Standard Estonian 'ei' for all persons sg/pl, versus Finnish en, et, ei, emme, ette, eivät.
- The plural is marked with -i-, in contrast to -de- being usual in North Estonian dialects: puhti käsiga, cf. Standard Estonian puhaste kätega, 'with clean hands'
- The preterite is marked with -i- as well, in contrast to -si- being usual in North Estonian.
- Unlike all other Estonian dialects, the coastal dialects have an inflected -nud participle, as in Finnish: (juobune piaga, cf. Standard Estonian joobnud peaga, literally 'with drunk head'; [saab] surne sõnumi, Standard Estonian [saab] surnu sõnumi '[gets] the dead man's message').

According to some authors, the "Finnish-like" features of the coastal Estonian dialects are archaisms (conservative traits), rather than Finnish or Ingrian influence.

The northeastern coastal dialect of Estonian is nowadays alternatively split into two dialects, the coastal dialect and the Alutaguse dialect, the former being more closely related to southern Finnish dialects (the sound õ [ɤ] is absent like in Finnish), the Ingrian (Izhorian) and Votic languages, whereas the latter has also been influenced by the central dialect of the Northern Estonian group.

== Notes, citations and references ==
=== Cited sources ===
- Laakso, Johanna (2001). "The Finnic languages". In Dahl, Östen; Koptjevskaja-Tamm, Maria (eds.). The Circum-Baltic languages. Typology and Contact. Studies in Language Companion Series. Vol. I: Past and Present. Amsterdam: John Benjamins. p. 207. doi:10.1075/slcs.54.09laa. ISBN 978-90-272-3057-7.
- Must, Mari (1987). Kirderannikumurre: häälikuline ja grammatiline ülevaade [The Northeast Coast Dialect: A Phonetic and Grammatical Review]. Tallinn: Valgus. LCCN 88150666. OCLC 22453574.
- Soderman, Tiina (1996). Lexical characteristics of the Estonian North Eastern coastal dialect (Thesis). Uppsala: Uppsala University. ISBN 91-554-3695-1.
- Viitso, Tiit-Rein (1998). "Fennic". In Abondolo, Daniel (ed.). Uralic languages. Routledge.
