= Karelian pony =

Horse breed in Russia

Karelian horse
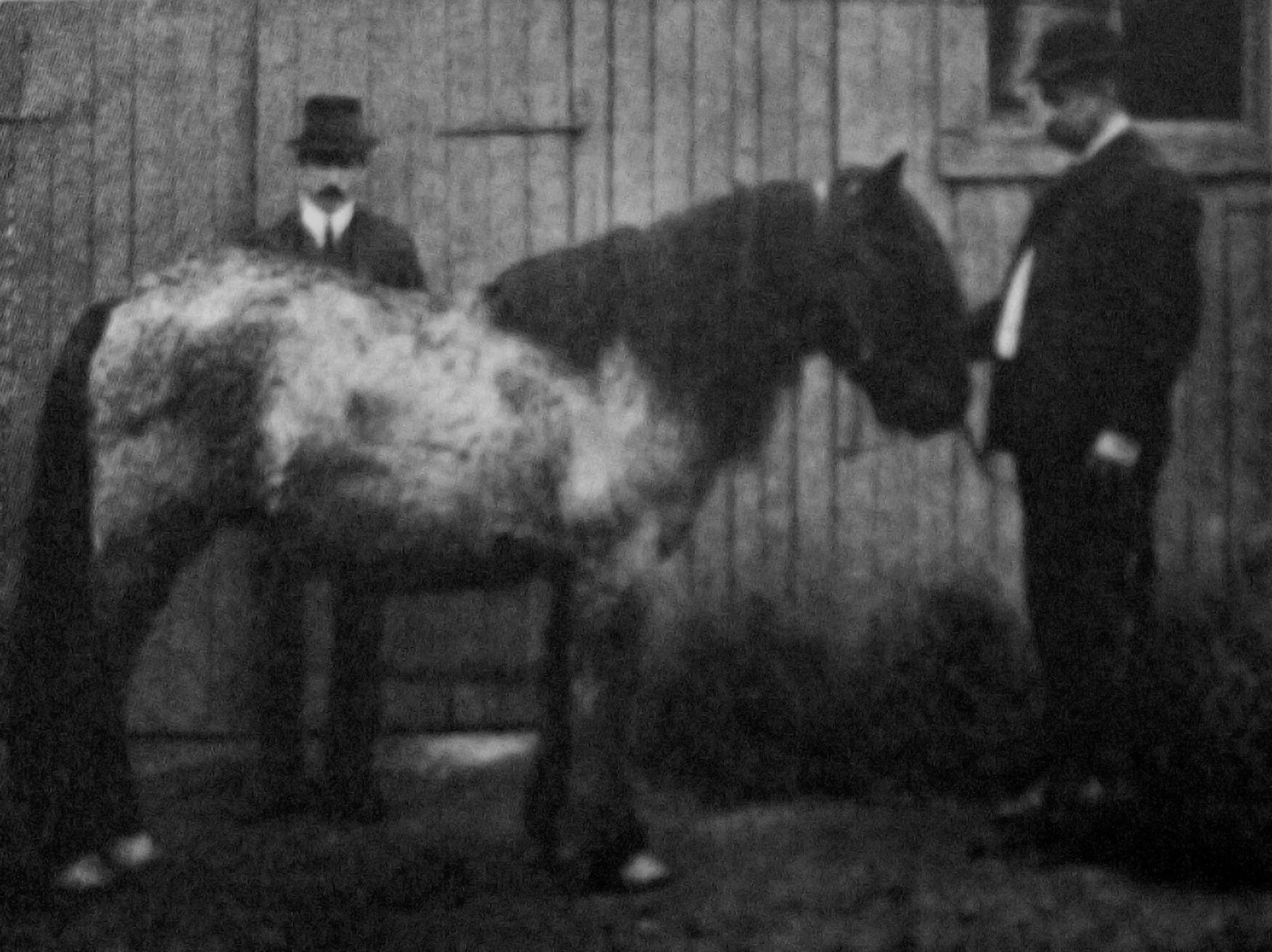
- Roan Karelian from the Karelian Isthmus, primitive type, 1.30 m high, photographed in 1909 for the Karjalainen newspaper.
- Country of origin: Russia and Finland
- Use: Horse-drawn vehicle

Traits
- Height: Approx. 1.40 m
- Color: Roan and primitive marked

The Karelian (Russian: Карельская лошадь Karel'skaya loshad) is a pony native to Karelia, a region of northern Europe between the Gulf of Finland and the White Sea. About 1.40 m tall, with a large head and angular physique, this pony belongs to the North Russian equine group. Reputedly very hardy, it sometimes shows primitive markings on its coat.

In the past, they were used in agriculture and for transport, especially pulling sledges. An integral part of the Karelian belief system, this pony is perceived as a wise animal with an excellent memory. The breed is now extinct, but there have been reports that there are at least 2 Karelian horses left, one of the Karelian breed, the other of "Onego" breed.

Karelian activists are trying to restore the breed.

== Terminology ==
This pony is also called Karelian in English, the transcription of its name in Russian Карельская лошадь being Karel'skaya loshad'. A variety of this breed is known as "Onego". In Karelian, the word heboine refers to the horse in a more general way.

== History ==
This breed probably corresponds to the "East Finnish" horse mentioned by hippologists. The agronomist Axel Alfthan (1862–1934) and the veterinarian Kaarlo Gummerus (1840–1898) characterized Finnish horses in two types, the East Finnish or Karelian, and the Central type. These two types remained identifiable until the early 20th century.

The Karelian never had a studbook. A Russian chronicle from 1338 mentions "Mare Karelia" (Finnish: Tamma-Karjala), probably to indicate a place where quality horses were bred.

The breed is mentioned in British novelist Andrew Soutar's (en) travelogue, as a very brave, easy-going and tireless pony; the author also points out that it is provided with very little food, and that its digestive capacity is such that it can eat anything and "love it". In 1895, Annie Margaret Clive Bayley also described this breed in her story Vignette from Finland: Or, Twelve Months in Strawberryland, citing sleigh rides and the sketchy diet given to these ponies.

The breed started to decline due to the unstable political, economic and social situation in Soviet Karelia caused by famine, World War I and World War II. Since the 1980s, native breeds have not been found in their original form. It was last mentioned in 2002 as the Karelo-Finnish horse.

== Description ==
The Karelian belongs to the North Russian pony group. At the beginning of the 20th century, its average height was estimated at 1.40 m.

It has a robust, angular body, pronounced withers, short neck and large head.

Coat color can vary widely. However, Karelian ponies, like other native breeds of Northern Europe, have the particularity of being able to sport welts on their limbs. These ponies are described as strong and sturdy, hardy and stubborn. Their ability to eat very little has also been highlighted.

== Usage ==
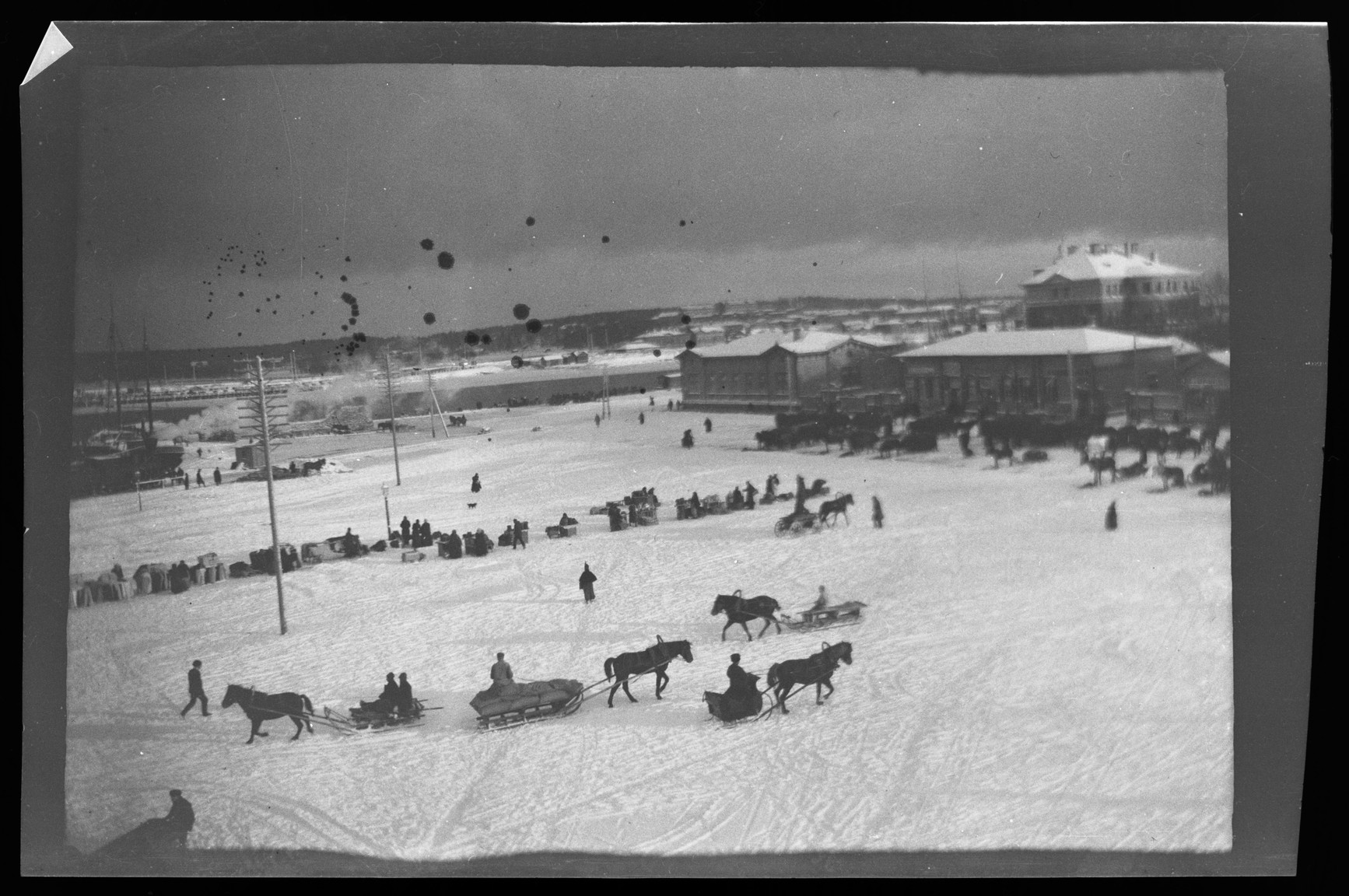
Sledges in Vyborg in the 1900s

In the past, these ponies were used for agricultural work in slash-and-burn farming areas, where they harrowed and ploughed the soil. They were also used for transport in a land where there were no roads, in particular for pulling sledges.

Historically, the inhabitants of Karelia resorted to walking or harnessing sledges for evacuation purposes.

== Breeding distribution ==
The breed is listed as local, and as a native of the former USSR, in the DAD-IS database. More precisely, it is indigenous to the Karelia region, on the border between Finland and Russia.

The most recent population data, from 2006 and 2007, indicate zero numbers.

The Karelian, including its Onega variety, is also listed as extinct in the latest edition of the CAB International encyclopedia (2016), as well as in the encyclopedia Tous les chevaux du monde (2014) by Delachaux et Niestlé, in the Guide des chevaux d'Europe (published in 2016 by the same publisher), and finally in the CAB International dictionary (2016).

== In culture ==
Although the region is theoretically Christianized, in the 19th century the inhabitants of Karelia still hold on to some older beliefs. Mistreating a horse is highly frowned upon, as it may cause the horse or its guardian spirit, haltija, to take revenge. The horse is also locally perceived as a wise animal with an excellent memory, capable of strong attachment to its home (kotipaikkauskollinen, meaning "loyal to the place of its home") and to the family that looks after it, to the point of perceiving its master's death from a distance. These beliefs influence the horse trade, as it is seen as preferable to sell a horse when it is very young. After a transaction involving an adult animal, it was common practice to perform a magical ritual designed to prevent the animal from fleeing its new home. The horse is finally perceived as an animal in contact with the other world.

== See also ==
- List of horse breeds
- Horses in Russia
- Finnhorse

== Bibliography ==
- Arppe, Pentti; Ristonmaa, Simo (1968). Suomen raviurheilu [Finnish horse racing] (in Finnish).
- Leinonen, Riitta-Marja (2017). "Living with Horses : Horse Agency in Human–Horse Cohabitation in Nineteenth-Century Finnish Swidden Culture". Shared Lives of Humans and Animals: Animal Agency in the Global North. Routledge. doi:10.4324/9781315228761-6.
- Ojala, Ilmari (1995). Suomenhevonen : Alkuperän monet mahdollisuudet [Finnish horse - its many origins]. Tammen Suuri hevoskirja (Tammi). ISBN 951-3-10515-6.
- Porter, Valerie (2002). "Karelian pony". Mason's World Dictionary of Livestock Breeds, Types and Varieties. CABI. ISBN 085199430X.
- Porter, Valerie; Alderson, Lawrence; Hall, Stephen; Sponenberg, Dan Phillip (2016). Mason's World Encyclopedia of Livestock Breeds and Breeding (6th ed.). CAB International. ISBN 978-1-84593-466-8.
- Talaskivi, Soini (1977). Suomalainen hevoskirja : hevoset ja ratsastus [Finnish horse book] (in Finnish). Otava. ISBN 951-1-11242-2.
