= Blockland =

Blockland may refer to:

- Blockland, Bremen, Germany
- Blockland (video game), a game from 2004/2007.

== See also ==
- Blokland (disambiguation)
