= South Karelian dialect =

Most spoken Karelian dialect

South Karelian
- South Karelian
- Suvikarjala
- Native to: Russia
- Region: Karelia
- Language family: Uralic: Finnic; Northern Finnic; Karelian; Karelian Proper; South Karelian
- Dialects: Tver Karelian

Official status
- Recognised minority language in: Finland; Russia: Republic of Karelia

Language codes
- ISO 639-3: –
- Glottolog: sout2676
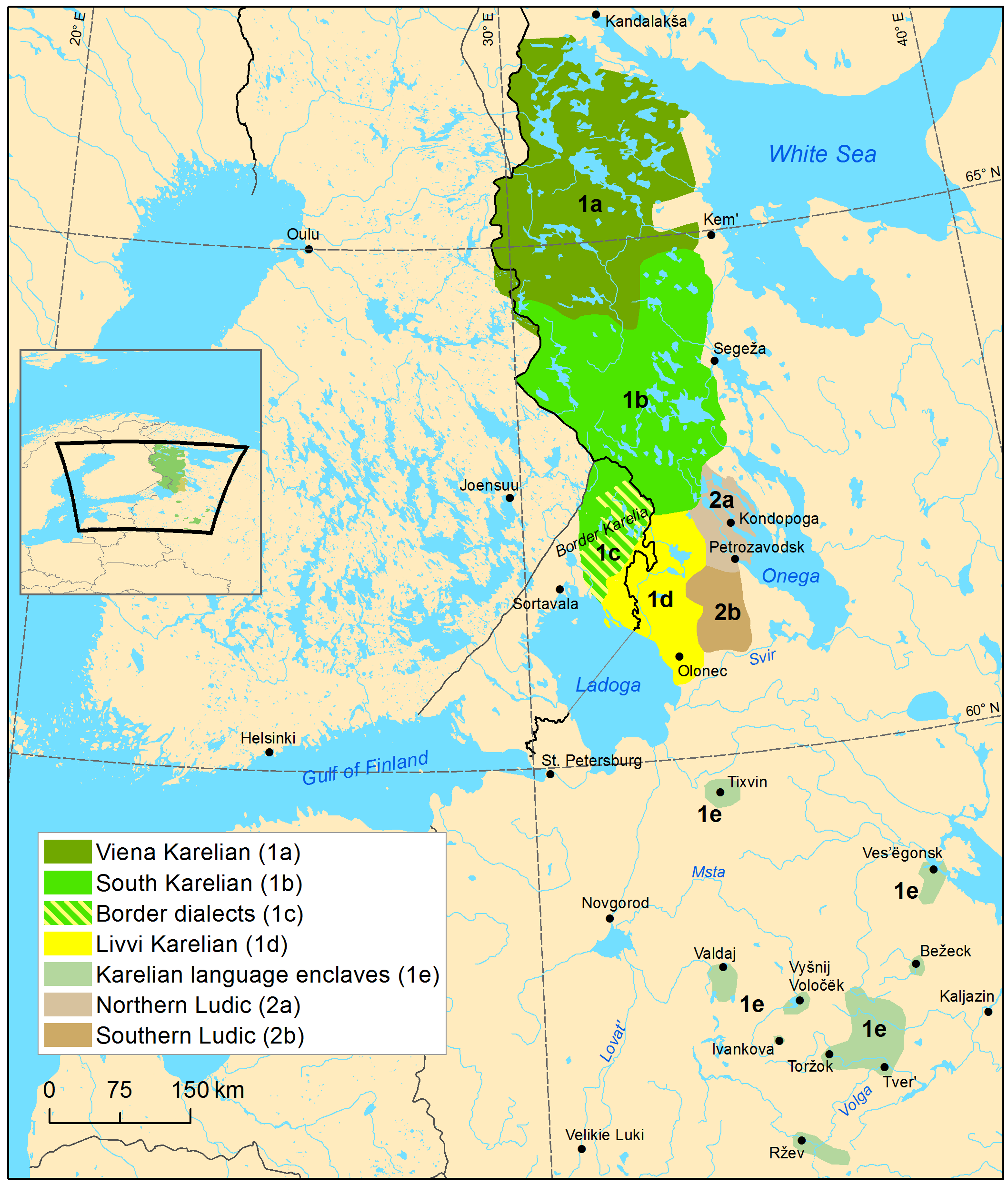
- Spread of South Karelian (1b) in the 20th century.

South Karelian (South Karelian: Suvikarjala) is the most spoken of the two dialects of Karelian Proper, and it is spoken in the Republic of Karelia and in the Tver Oblast. South Karelian was also previously spoken in Border Karelia when it was part of Finland. Many speakers of the South Karelian dialect were evacuated from Finnish Karelia into other areas of Finland during the 20th century, where a number of speakers are still retained. South Karelian displays a higher degree of regional variation than any other Karelian dialect.

The Karelian enclave dialects such as Tikhvin, Valday and Tver Karelian are also derived from South Karelian.

South Karelian is mainly distinguished from North Karelian by containing the voiced sounds b, d, g, z and ž, which are missing from the Northern dialect of Karelian proper.

== Examples ==
The following example is taken from a 2016 Karelian in Seinäjoki:

South Karelian	Finnish	English
Suojärvellä rištikanzat paistih karjalua dai vielä voinan jälgeh Valdimolla elevyttyö. Rannanhierus susiedat kaikin paistih mugaleite. Yhenjyty miegi opassuin pagizemah. Engo ni muuda malttan školah männessä.	Suojärvellä ihmiset puhuivat karjalaa, myös vielä sodan jälkeen asetuttuaan Valtimolle. Rannankylässä kaikki naapurit puhuivat samalla tavalla. Minäkin opin puhumaan siten. Enkä muuta osannutkaan mennessäni kouluun	In Suojärvi, people spoke Karelian, even after the war when they had settled in Valtimo. In Rannankylä, all the neighbors spoke the same way. I also learned to speak like that. And I didn’t know any other language when I went to school

Southern, Northern and Livvi dialects compared:

Livvi	Southern	Northern	English
pakkaskuu	pakkaiskuu	pakkaiskuu	January
tuhukuu	tuuččakuu	tuiskukuu	February
kevätkuu	kevätkuu	kevätkuu	March
sulakuu	sulakuu	šulakuu	April
