= Karelians =

Ethnic group

Karelians (Note: This infobox does not include Finnish Karelians, who are considered a subgroup of Finnish people) karjalaižet karjalazet karjalaiset
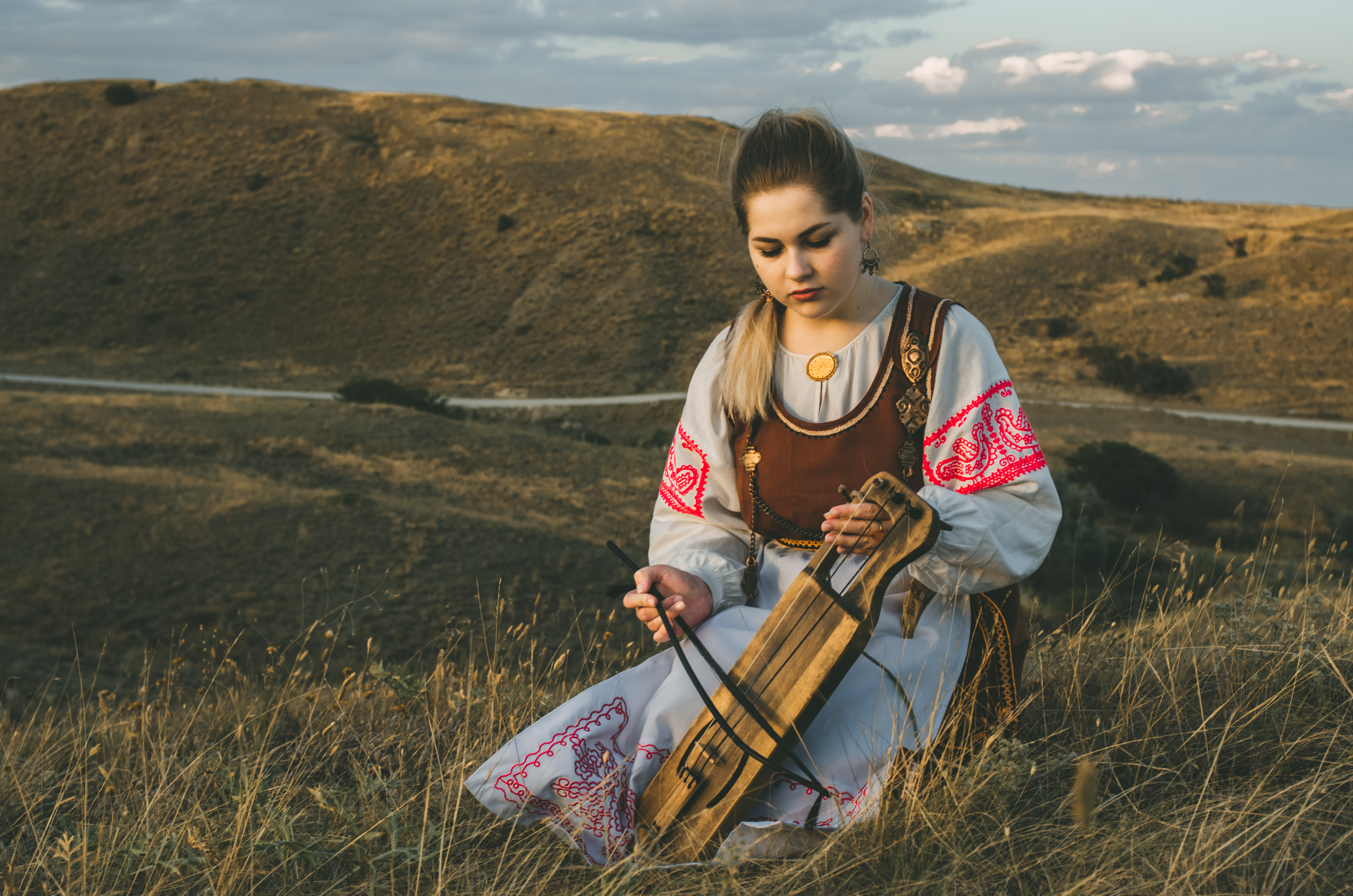
- Karelian woman playing jouhikko

Total population
- c. 43,000 (2020)

Regions with significant populations
- Russia: 32,422 (2020)
- Finland: 10,000 (1994)
- Ukraine: 1,522 (2001)
- Estonia: 290 (2021)
- Belarus: 302 (2009)
- Latvia: 192 (2018)
- Lithuania: 39 (2011)

Languages
- Karelian, Livvi-Karelian, Ludian

Religion
- Eastern Orthodox majority Lutheranism among other Protestant minority denominations being practiced by smaller amounts of Karelians

Related ethnic groups
- Other Baltic Finns; Especially Finnish Karelians, Izhorians, and Vepsians

- People: Karelians
- Language: Karelian; Livvi-Karelian
- Country: Karelia

Karelians (Karelian: karjalaižet, karjalazet, karjalaiset; Finnish: karjalaiset; Swedish: kareler, karelare; Russian: карелы, romanized: karely) are a Baltic Finnic ethnic group who are indigenous to the historical region of Karelia, which is today split between Finland and Russia. Karelians living in Russian Karelia are considered a distinct ethnic group closely related to Finnish Karelians, who are considered a subset of Finns. This distinction historically arose from Karelia having been fought over and eventually split between Sweden and Novgorod, resulting in Karelians being under different cultural spheres.

In Russia, Karelians mostly live in the Republic of Karelia, where they are the designated ethnic group, and in other adjacent north-western parts of the country. They traditionally speak the Karelian language and are Eastern Orthodox Christians. There are also significant Karelian enclaves in the Tver and Novgorod oblasts, as some Karelians migrated to those areas after the Russo-Swedish War of 1656–1658.

In Finland, the term "Karelian" generally refers to the Finnish Karelians. There were Karelian-speaking Karelians living in the easternmost parts of Finnish Karelia, known as "Border Karelia" (Raja-Karjala). As Finland had to cede parts of Karelia to the Soviet Union in World War II, evacuated Karelians and Finnish Karelians settled elsewhere in Finland. A minority of them, about 38,000, were Border Karelian Orthodox Christians, who traditionally spoke Karelian. However, owing to Karelian being previously unrecognized as its own language by the Finnish government, most of these Karelians had no choice but to learn Finnish and now speak mostly Finnish.

== History ==
=== Middle Ages ===
During the Early Middle Ages, settlers from western Finland mixed with the local population to form the Karelian ethnic group. Possible migration from elsewhere may also have contributed to the Karelian ethnic composition.

Archeological evidence indicates that Karelian inhabitation was highest along the western shore of Lake Ladoga and the Karelian Isthmus, with multiple cemeteries and other archeological discoveries dating from AD 600 to AD 800. In South Karelia, the number of archeological discoveries from this time period is lower, though permanent inhabitation was nonetheless present. Lappee, South Karelia has been continuously inhabited for approximately 2,000 years. In North Karelia, only one archeological discovery from this time period has been found, dating to the eighth century. The considerably higher number of archeological discoveries in these regions from AD 800 to AD 1050 indicates that the Karelian population grew and expanded rapidly during this time.

The first written mention of Karelia and Karelians occurs in Scandinavian sources. Several old Scandinavian sagas and chronicles refer to Karelia sometimes as Karjalabotn, Kirjalabotnar, or Kirjaland, which means that Karelians and Karelia were known to the Vikings as early as the 7th century. Another mention of Karelians in Scandinavian sources is The Chronicle of Erik. Part of the Chronicle attributes to the Karelians the sack and pillage of Sigtuna in 1187. This mention of Karelian raids on Sweden in the chronicle is given as the main reason to found Stockholm, the current capital of Sweden.

The first mention of Karelians in Russian chronicles dates to 1143, when the Novgorod chronicle mentions that Karelians raided neighbouring Tavastia (Häme). Russian chronicles referred to Karelians as Koryela. Until the end of the 13th century, Karelians enjoyed a period of relative independence and self-government. However, as Karelians came in contact with Novgorod some of them started to take part in internal and external Novgorodian politics. Russian chronicles mention a joint raid of Novgorod and Karelians on Tavastia in 1191. In the 13th century, the Karelian relationship with Novgorod underwent significant changes, from partnership and alliance to gradual dominance by the latter.

In 1227, an attempt was made to convert Karelians to Eastern Orthodoxy. In 1253, Karelians aided Novgorod in its wars with Estonians. In 1269, the prince of Novgorod prepared a raid against Karelians, but he abandoned his plans as he was advised against it by his councilors. In 1278, Novgorod made war against Karelians and, according to the chronicle, put Karelian lands "to sword and fire", which significantly reduced Karelian military power.

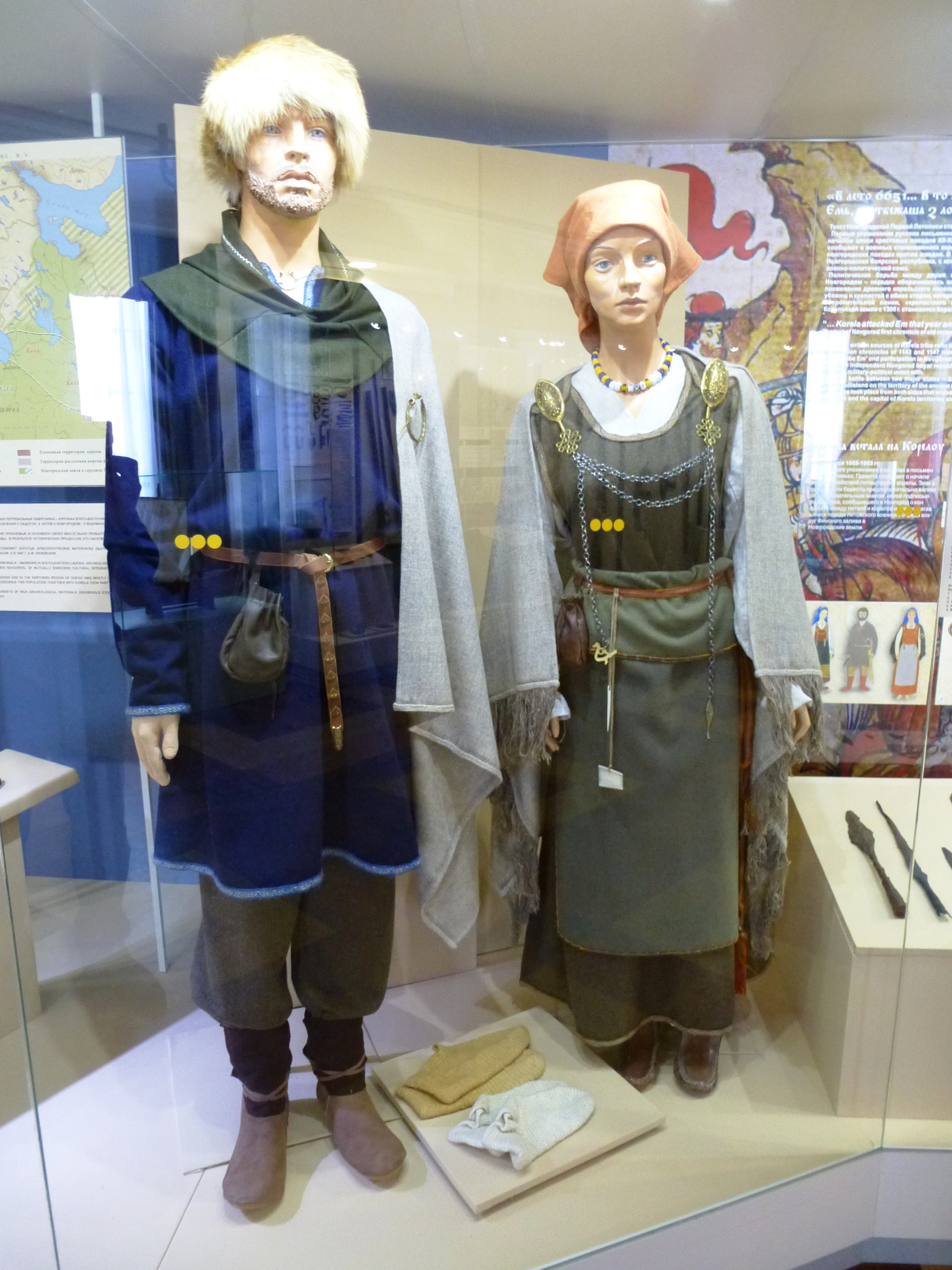
Karelians in the 12th–14th centuries, National Museum of the Republic of Karelia

While Novgorod unsuccessfully tried to subdue Karelians, Sweden achieved its goals over the neighbouring Finnish tribes. The Swedes raided Karelian lands, began to convert the local population to Roman Catholicism and attempted to ensure their complete dominance with the foundation of castles, in 1293 at Vyborg and in 1295 at Kexholm (Käkisalmi in Finnish, Koryela in Russian chronicles), on the sites of ancient Karelian settlements. However, Novgorod managed to repel the Swedish attack by capturing and burning down Kexholm Castle. After this, Sweden and Novgorod engaged in the long conflict for rule over the Karelians and their lands.

In 1314, Karelians rose up against efforts made to convert them to Christianity, according to the Novgorod chronicle. The first rebellion started against Russian Orthodoxy with Käkisalmi captured and the killing of all Christians there. Then the rebellion spread over all Karelian lands, which sufficiently weakened Novgorodian influence.

In 1323, Karelians suffered a forceful sundering as Sweden and Novgorod divided Karelian lands and their inhabitants by signing a peace agreement. The agreement transferred governance of all western Karelian lands to Swedish sovereignty, while eastern Karelian lands fell under Novgorodian rule. This sundering started a long process of separation of Karelians into two different halves, with the main difference being religion, as western Karelians became first Roman Catholic and later Lutheran, while eastern Karelians became Eastern Orthodox.

Subsequent wars had Karelians fighting on both sides of the conflict and often against each other. Meanwhile, Karelians on the Novgorodian and later Russian side of the border continued to settle northward towards the White Sea. By the late 14th century, Russian Karelians established control over White Karelia and came in conflict with the Norwegians on the peninsula of Kola.

=== Early modern period ===
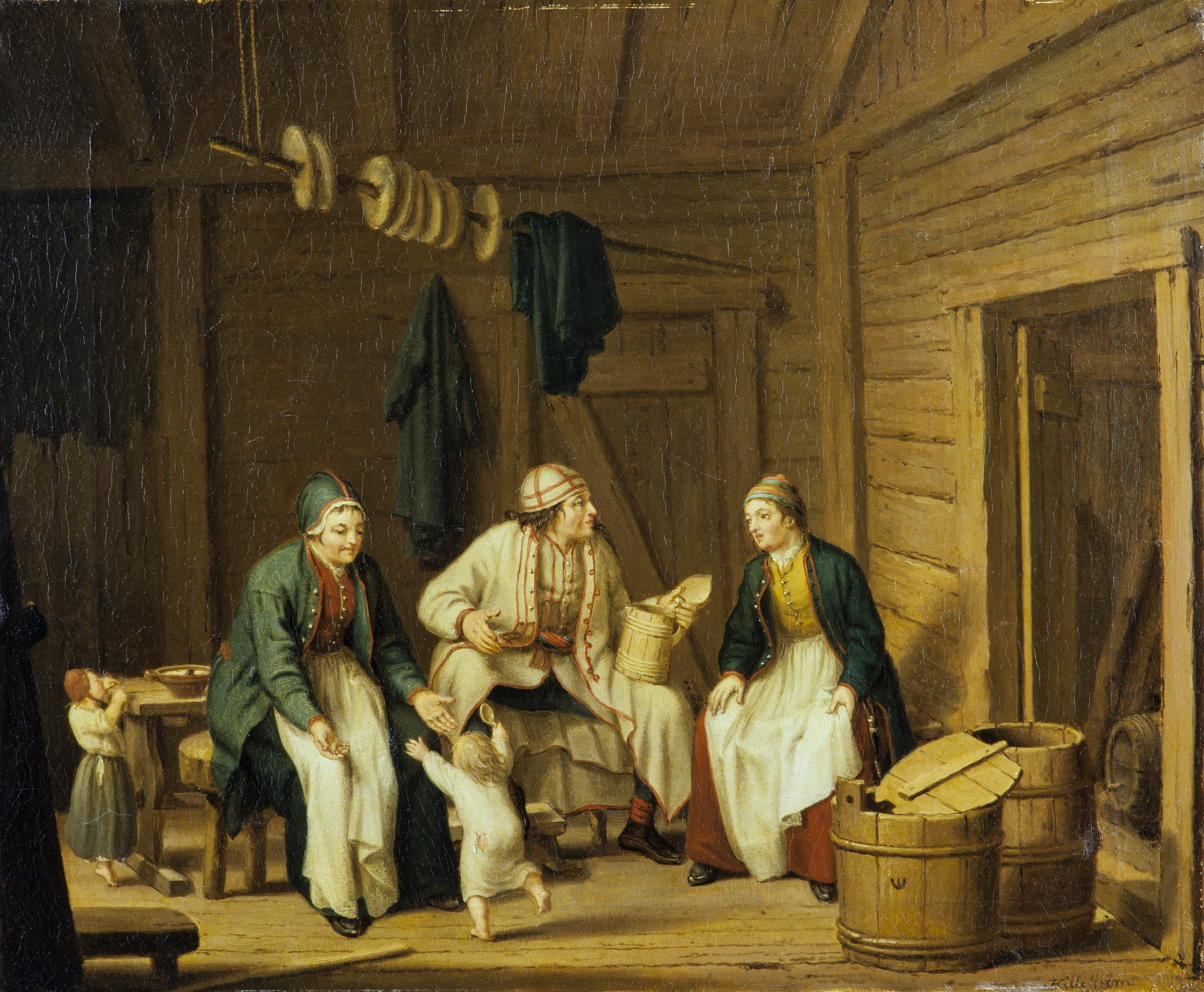
Karelians in 1782–1810, by Pehr Hilleström

As the struggle for power in the region continued over the next centuries the borderline between Sweden and Russia moved several times with most of the changes happening in Northern Karelia and Kainuu. However, in 1617, the history of Karelians underwent a significant change as Russia ceded to Sweden, along with other territories, the eastern part of the Karelian Isthmus, Ladoga Karelia and modern-day North Karelia. This meant that the majority of Karelians were again living in one country, yet it did not bring peace to the Karelian people. As Sweden commenced the process of conversion of population of the ceded territories to Lutheran Protestantism, resistance appeared among Old-Believer Orthodox Karelians and neighbouring Orthodox Izhorians.

By the mid-17th century, the tension between the Lutheran Swedish government and Orthodox Karelians led to yet another conflict between Sweden and Russia. From 1656 to 1658, Russian armed forces waged war on Karelian territories and tried to recapture them with the aid of some of the sympathizing local Orthodox population, but after two years of fighting both sides came to a stand-still.

Many of the Karelians who remained Orthodox by 1658 were unwilling to remain in Sweden and convert to Lutheranism, which triggered a mass migration of many Orthodox Karelians from these areas into other parts of Russia, some going to the region of Tver and forming the Tver Karelians minority, while others moved to the region of Valdai in the Novgorod region and yet others to White Karelia by the White Sea.

As some of the lands in the eastern Karelian Isthmus and Ladoga Karelia became partially depopulated Sweden decided to move settlers from Savonia to those Karelian lands which resulted in a mixture of local Karelians with Savonians in some areas. However, as Savonians themselves are of Karelian origin, this migration mostly affected local Karelians religiously (as the majority of the population became Lutheran) and to some extent linguistically, but it did not bring major changes to the ethnic map of Karelia.

The next change happened in 1721 as Russia won the Great Northern War against Sweden (1700–21), which forced Sweden to cede the entire Karelian Isthmus and Ladoga Karelia to Russia, with its now mostly Lutheran population. Although there were attempts to convert the local population to Orthodoxy these did not meet with any success.

=== Late modern period ===
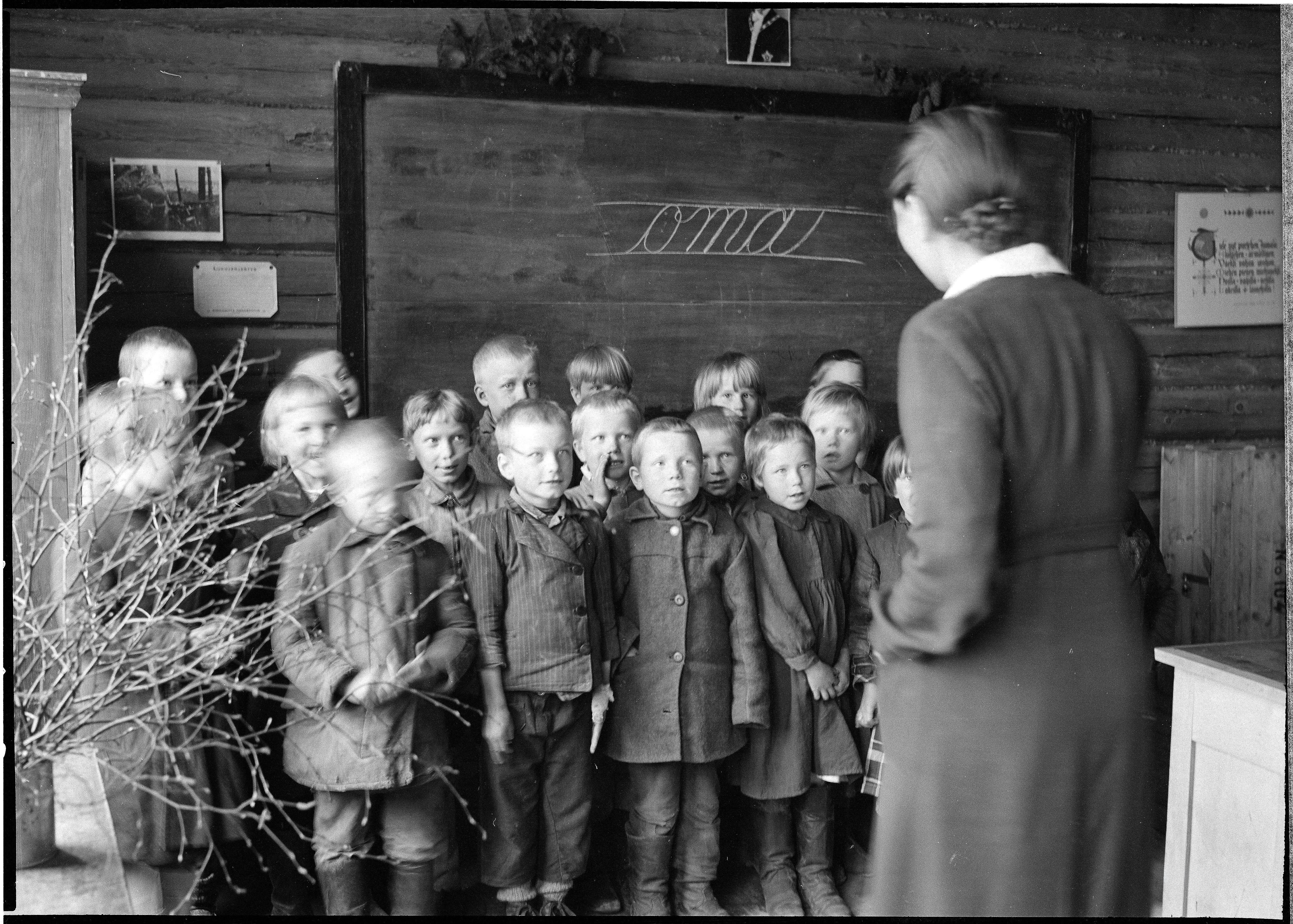
Karelian children in Kuytezha, Karelia, 1942

After Russia conquered the entire Finnish territories in yet another Russo-Swedish war in 1808–09, it was decided to join the Karelian Isthmus and Ladoga Karelia to the newly formed Grand Duchy of Finland in 1812, which brought all western Karelians into the same state with Finns, while eastern Karelians remained under independent Russian administration. Although Karelians ended up in the same country the religious difference between eastern and western Karelians remained a dividing factor, which somewhat affected the linguistics but even until the beginning of the 20th century both groups could understand each other. Yet eastern Karelians managed to preserve traditions and folklore better than western Karelians.

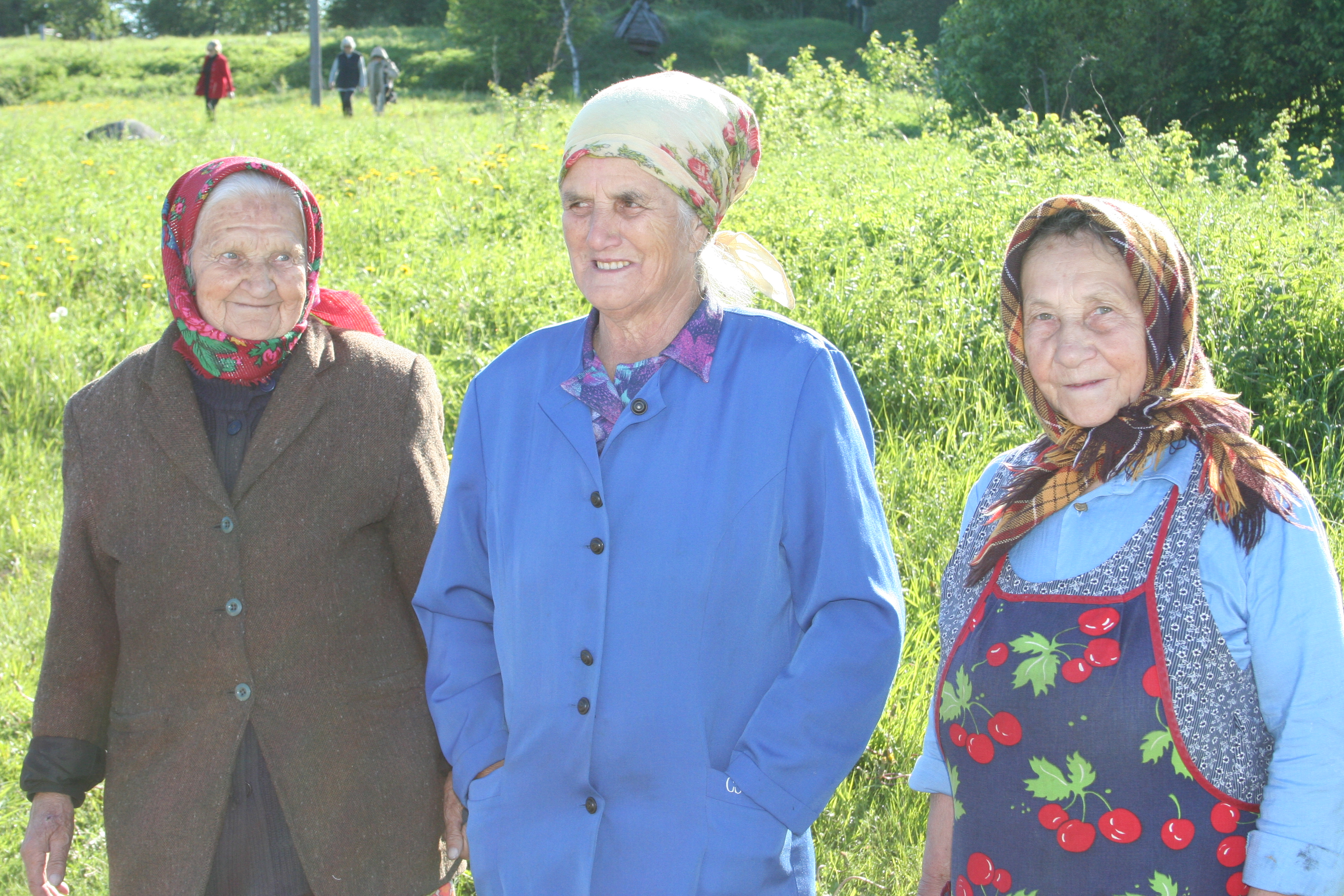
Karelian elders in Sambatuksa (Sammatus), Russian Karelia.

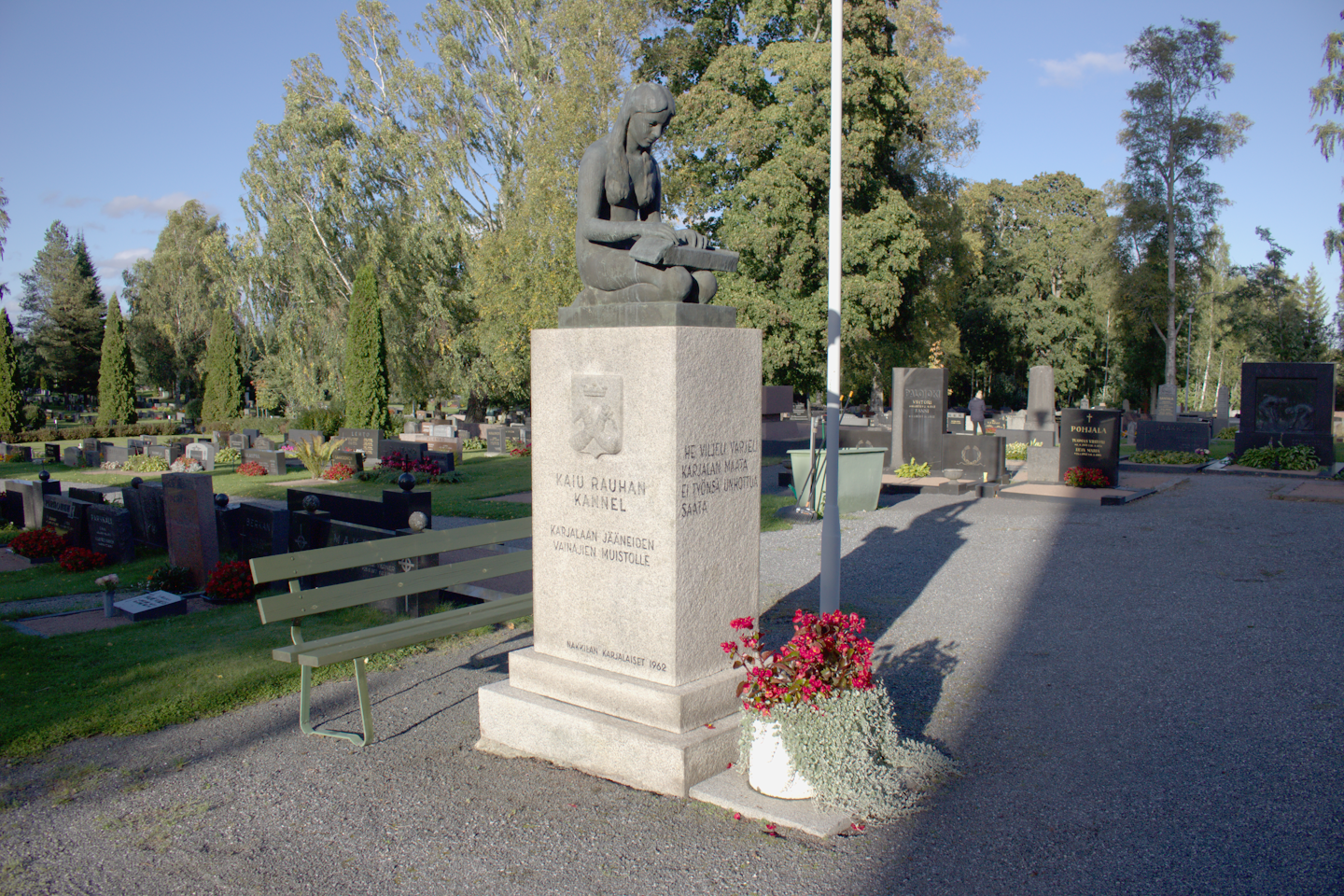
Memorial statue for the deceased who remained in Karelia

As the Grand Duchy of Finland was formed, its inhabitants struggled to properly identify themselves ethnically, some being Finnish, some Swedish and some Karelian. As the Fennoman movement started and the new Finnish nation commenced its forming and shaping process, attempts were made to restore the lost Finnish identity. The process of "finnisation" of Finland started. As part of that process during the 19th century, Finnish folklorists including Elias Lönnrot traveled to different parts of Eastern Karelia to gather folklore and epic poetry. The Orthodox Karelians in North Karelia and Russia were now seen as close brethren or even a sub-group of the Finns. The ideology of Karelianism inspired Finnish artists and researchers, who believed that the Orthodox Karelians had retained elements of an archaic, original Finnish culture which had disappeared from Finland. This led to numerous confusions with some claiming that western and eastern Karelians were different nations.

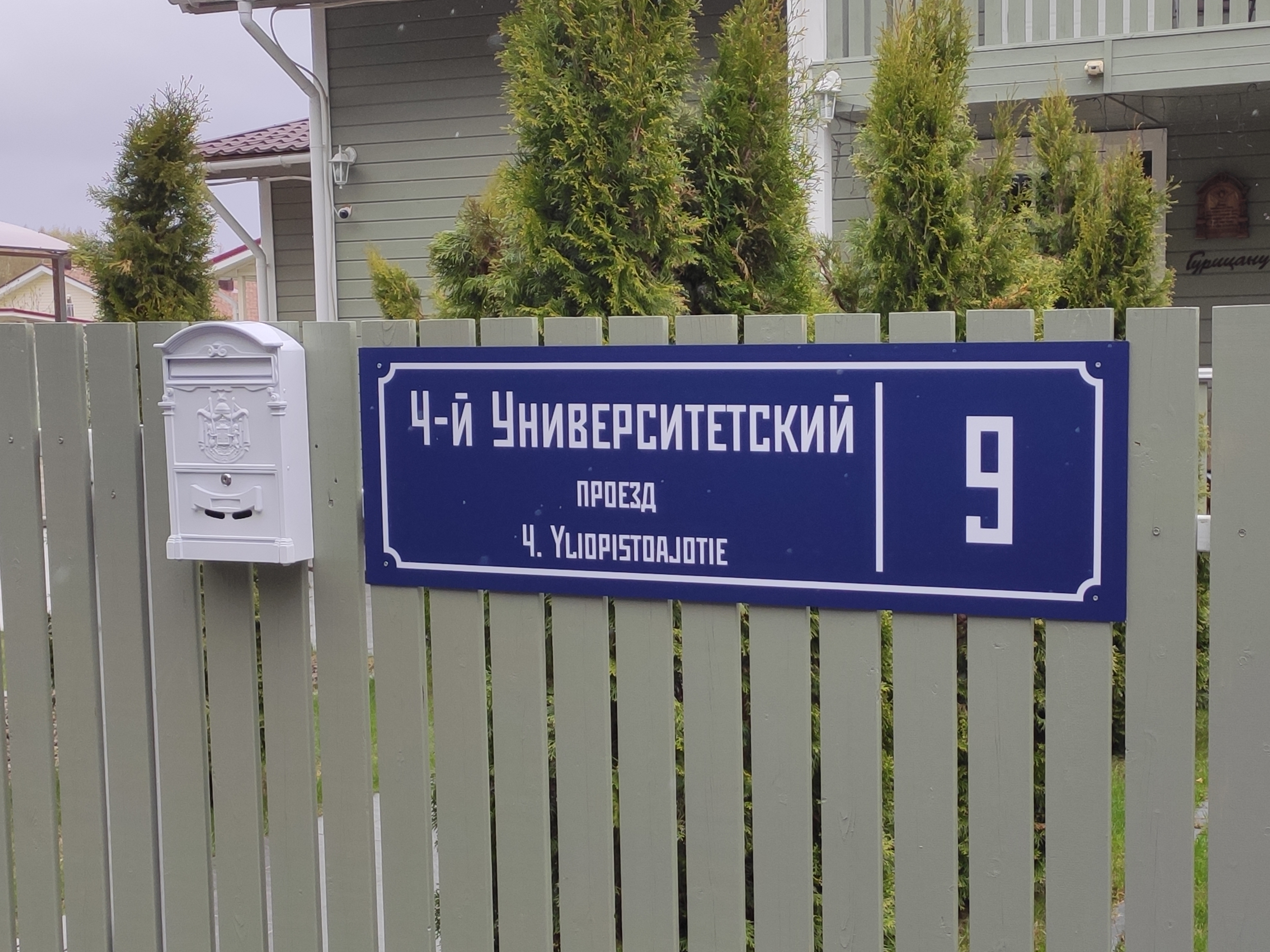
Bilingual Russian–Karelian signs in Petrozavodsk, Russian Karelia

As Finland gained its independence in 1917 the process of "finnisation" continued, but now even eastern Karelians were viewed as part of the Finnish nation. From 1918 to 1922, Finland made several attempts to expand into Eastern Karelia with some support by local Karelians. Several thousands of eastern Karelians migrated to Finland by 1922 from different parts of Eastern Karelia.

After the Winter War, Finland had to cede the Karelian Isthmus and Ladoga Karelia to the USSR. As the local Karelian population was unwilling to end up under Soviet rule, over 400,000 people were evacuated across Finland's new border from the territories that were to be ceded. After the Continuation War (1941–1944), in which Finland temporarily held most of Eastern Karelia, several thousands of Karelians chose to migrate west as Finnish forces retreated. The Karelians who migrated to Finland in the 20th century were initially Karelian speakers, but due to minor lingual differences and in order to assimilate into the local communities soon adopted the Finnish language after the war. Some of the evacuees later immigrated, mainly to Sweden, Australia and North America.

Russian Karelians, living in the Republic of Karelia, are nowadays rapidly being absorbed into the Russian population. This process began several decades ago. For example, it has been estimated that even between the 1959 and 1970 Soviet censuses, nearly 30 percent of those who were enumerated as Karelian by self-identification in 1959 changed their self-identification to Russian 11 years later.

== Language ==
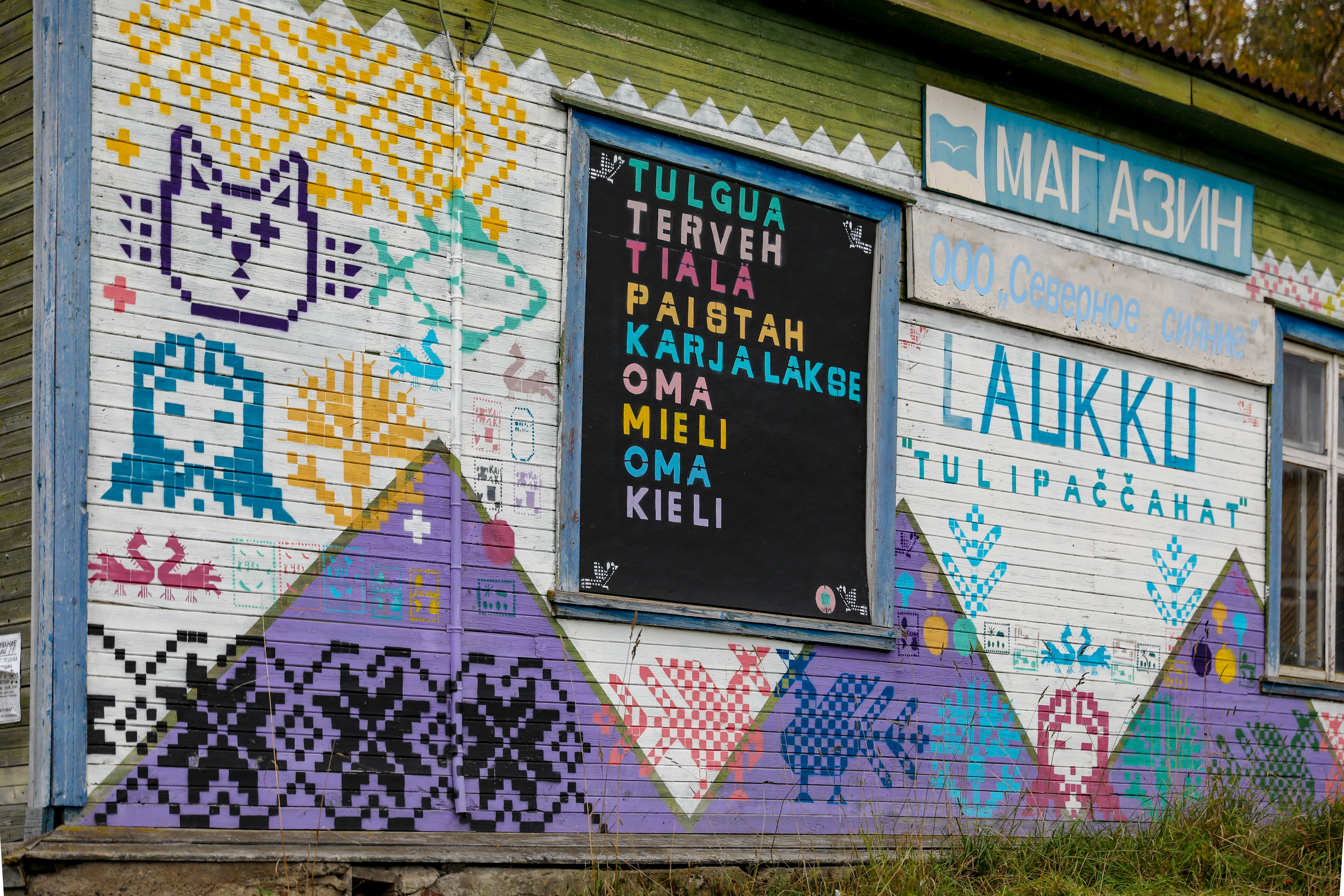
A store (Karelian laukku) in Vedlozero, Russia. The sign translates to: "Welcome. Here, Karelian is spoken. Own mind, own language."

The Karelian language is closely related to the Finnish language. Here are the dialects of what can be classified as the Karelian language:

- North Karelian (northern parts of the Karelian republic and in some villages near the Russian border in the Kainuu region even today);
- South Karelian (Southern parts of the Karelian republic, before World War II also in the easternmost part of what was Finland before the war, and in different locations in the current area of Finland and elsewhere after WWII);
  - Tver Karelian (In Tver area, Russia);
- Olonets Karelian or Livvi (in southeastern parts of Karelian republic, before World War II also in the easternmost part of What was Finland before the war, and in different locations in the current area of Finland and elsewhere after the WWII).

Ludic in the easternmost part of Karelian republic is currently considered a language of its own.

In addition to that, dialects of Karelian language are also spoken in different locations in the current area of Finland and elsewhere after WWII and in some villages near the Russian border in Kainuu region the northern dialect of Karelian language has been spoken continuously until now.

== Religion ==
The majority of Russian Karelians are Eastern Orthodox Christians. Folk-beliefs have also been widely incorporated into Christianity by Orthodox Karelians. Karelian tales, along with some Finnish ones, have been collected to form Kalevala. A number of Lutheran revivalistic movements such as Laestadianism were influential among Karelian towns in the 20th century.

Before the Winter War, Karelia also became the region with the largest congregations of Methodist believers in Finland; however these believers became split across Finland as evacuees after the annexation of the region by the Soviet Union, causing a decline in total membership.

== Demographics ==
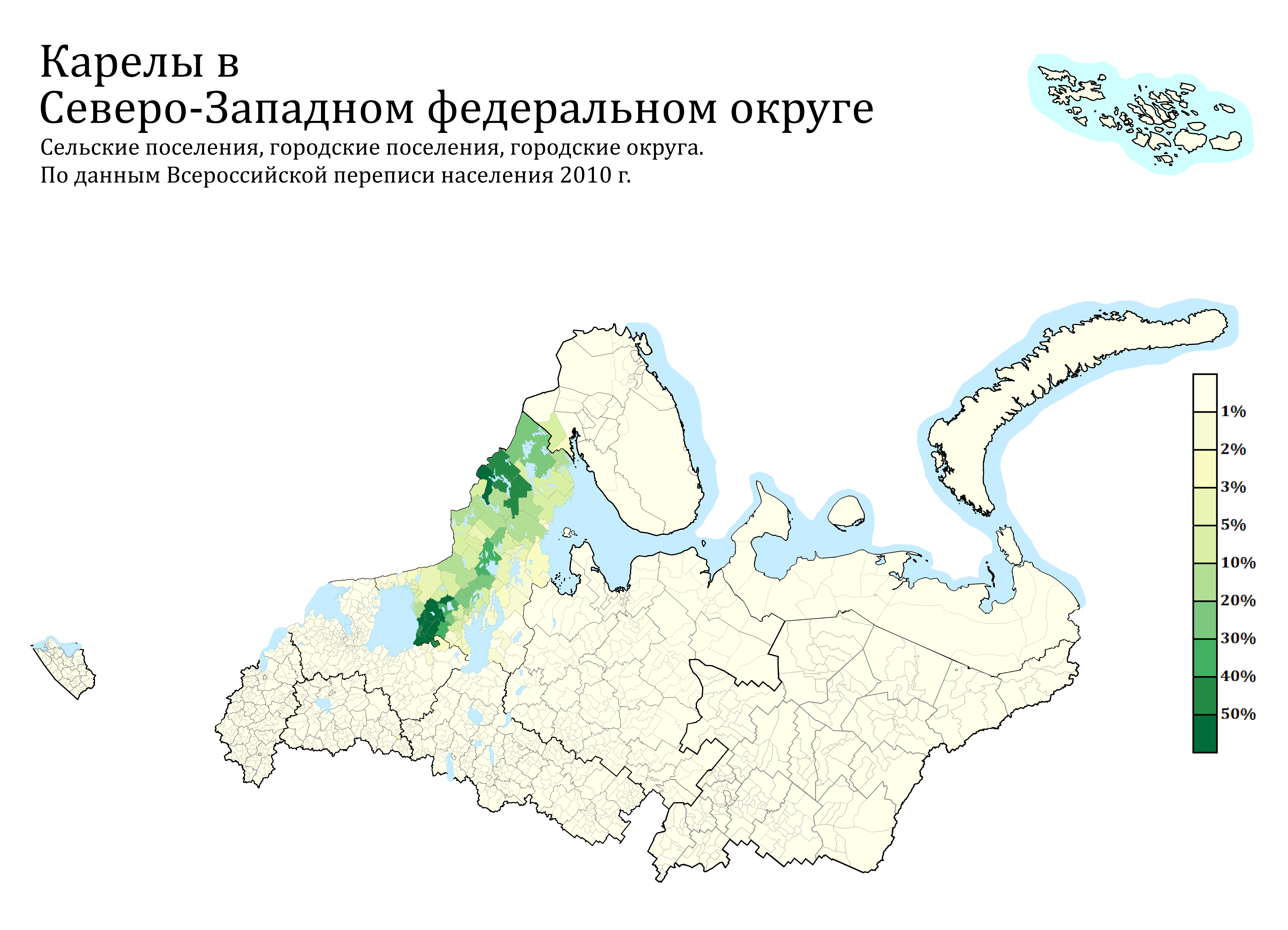
Settlement of Karelians in the Northwestern Federal District by urban and rural settlements in %, 2010 census.

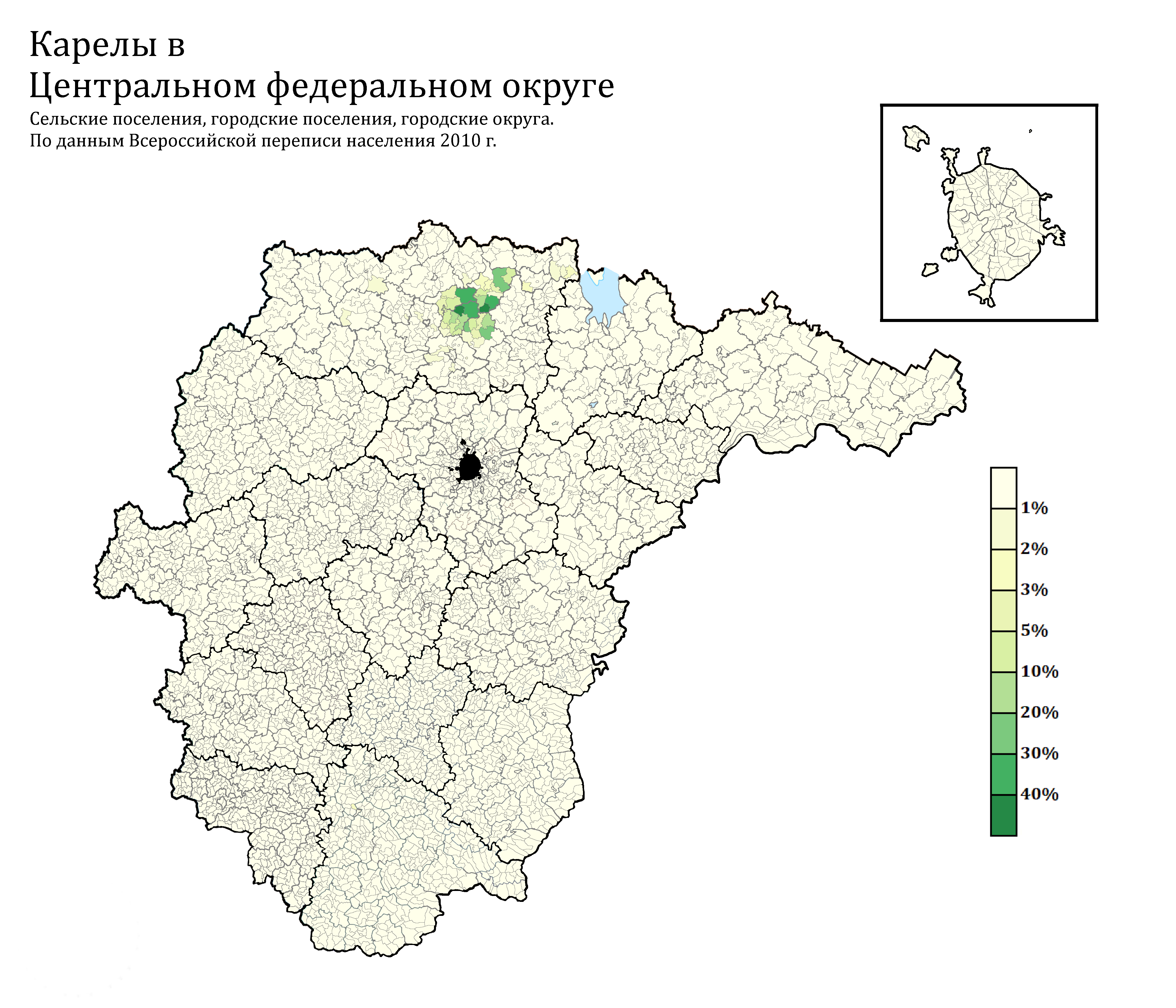
Settlement of Karelians in the Central Federal District by urban and rural settlements in %, 2010 census.

Significant enclaves of Karelians exist in the Tver oblast of Russia, resettled after Russia's defeat in 1617 against Sweden — in order to escape forced conversion to Lutheranism in Swedish Karelia. The Russians also promised tax deductions if the Orthodox Karelians migrated there. Olonets (Aunus) is the only city in Russia where the Karelians form a majority (60% of the population).

Karelians have been declining in numbers in modern times significantly due to a number of factors. These include low birthrates (characteristic of the region in general) and especially Russification, due to the predominance of Russian language and culture.

In 1926, according to the census, Karelians only accounted for 37.4% of the population in the Soviet Karelian Republic (which at that time did not yet include territories that would later be taken from Finland and added, most of which had mostly Karelian inhabitants), or 100,781 Karelians. Russians, meanwhile, numbered 153,967 in Karelia, or 57.2% of the population. Adding the Tver Karelian population of 140,567 at the time to the statistic gives a total of at least 241,348 Karelians in the whole USSR, if not far more.

By 2000, there were 65,651 Karelians in the Republic of Karelia (65.1% of the number in 1926, including the Karelian regions taken from Finland which were not counted in 1926), and Karelians made up only 9.2% of the population in their homeland. Russians, meanwhile, were 76.6% of the population in Karelia.

In the 2021 Census, there were 25,901 Karelians in the Republic of Karelia, only 5.5% of the population. Meanwhile Russians now make up 86.4% of the population in Karelia. The total number of Karelians in Russia was 32,422, or 0.02% of the country's population.

Karelians in Russia (1926–2021)
Census	1926	1939	1959	1970	1979	1989	2002	2010	2021
Population	248,030	249,855	164,050	141,148	133,182	124,921	93,344	60,815	32,422
Percentage	0.27%	0.23%	0.14%	0.11%	0.10%	0.08%	0.06%	0.04%	0.02%

== Genetics ==
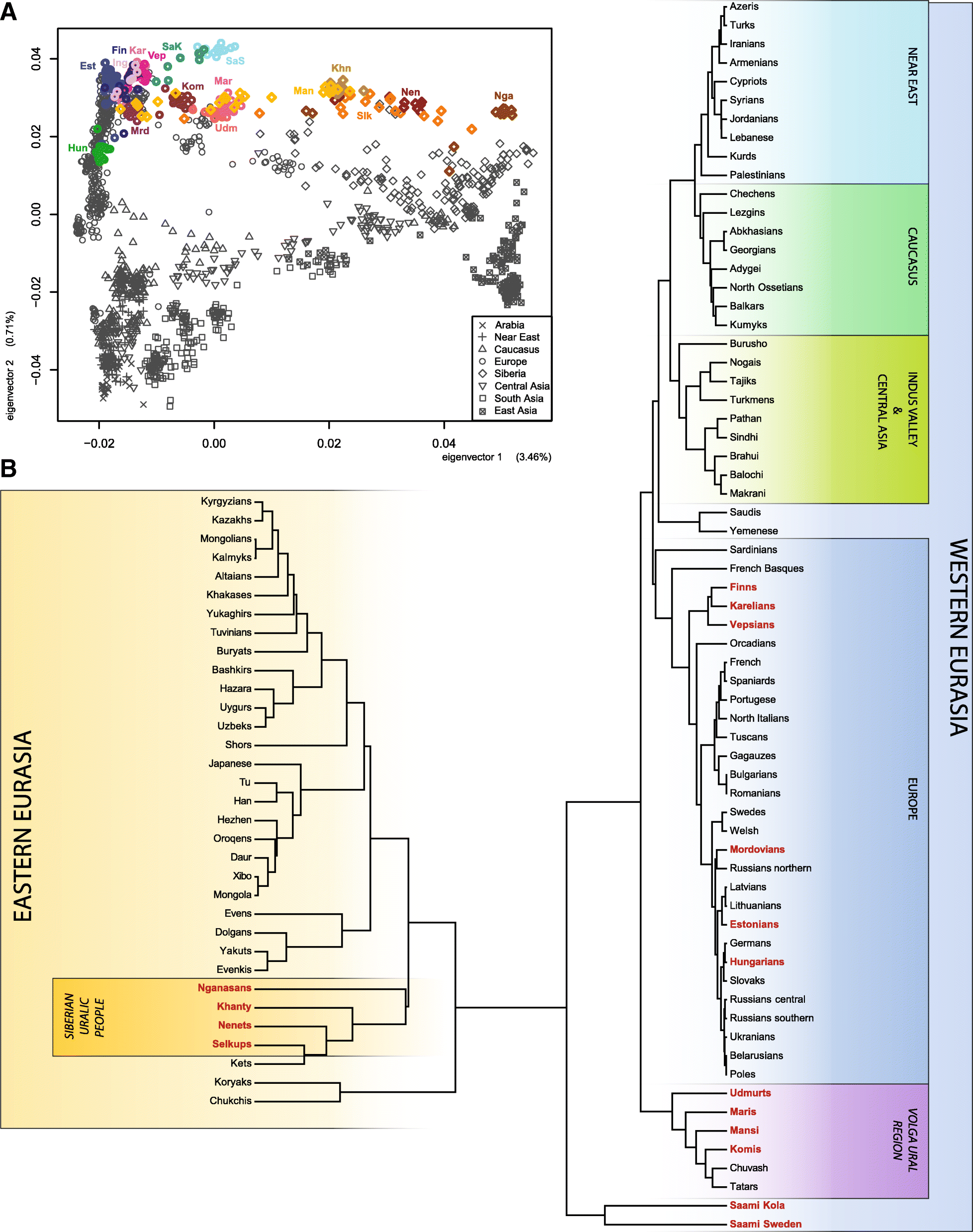
PCA and genetic distances of Uralic-speaking populations (Tambets et al 2018).

The Y-chromosome haplogroup N1c is typical among Karelians, as it is observed in either slightly more or less than 40 percent of Karelian men, though with subgroup variation, peaking in the north, and being depleted in subgroups such as Ludic speakers. It has high frequencies among Uralic-speaking and other North Eurasian populations. Haplogroup R1a is approximately as common for Karelian males, and 10 percent of them belong to the haplogroup I-M170. The mtDNA haplogroups among Karelians include H (45.7%) and U (27.2%), especially its subclade U5.

While their autosomal ancestry is mostly European, Karelians also carry some Siberian-related admixture (6–12 %) commonly found in Uralic-speaking groups. Like other Baltic Finnic peoples, Karelians have a high level of Steppe-related admixture. Karelians cluster with Finns and Vepsians.

Karelians share more IBD (identity-by-descent) segments with several other Uralic-speaking groups, including geographically distant ones from Volga-Ural and Siberia, than with their non-Uralic-speaking neighbours. This is consistent with the idea that the Uralic peoples share common roots to some degree. Karelians are found to have significant IBD sharing with some non-Uralic-speaking peoples from the same distant regions, such as the Volga Tatars, Yakuts and Evens, as well.

== See also ==
- List of Karelians
- Tornedalians
- Ingrians
- Forest Finns
- Sweden Finns
- Finland-Swedes
- Kvens
- Kalevala
- Karelian pony
