= Mikshino =

Mikshino Микшино
- Village
- Location within Vladimir Oblast Location within Russia
- Coordinates: 56°29′N 40°56′E
- Country: Russia
- Region: Vladimir Oblast
- District: Kameshkovsky District
- Time zone: UTC+3:00

Mikshino (Russian: Микшино; Russian pronunciation: [mɪkʂɪnɵ]) is a rural locality (a village) in Vakhromeyevskoye Rural Settlement, Kameshkovsky District, Vladimir Oblast, Russia. The population was 47 as of 2010.

== Geography ==
Mikshino is located 20 km north of Kameshkovo (the district's administrative centre) by road. Ivishenye is the nearest rural locality.
