= Talja Blokland =

Social scientist and urban researcher

Talja V. Blokland (born 1971) is a Dutch and German social scientist and urban researcher. She studied sociology at the Erasmus University Rotterdam and was a PhD student in social sciences at the Amsterdam School for Social Research from 1994 to 1997, and at the New School University in 1996. After her PhD, she was a visiting scholar at Yale University and Manchester University. She was appointed as part-time Gradus Hendriks Professor in Community Development at Erasmus University and became a senior researcher and program director at the OTB Institute for Urban, Housing and Mobility Studies at the Delft University of Technology. She came to Humboldt-University of Berlin to be appointed on the Chair of Urban and Regional Sociology on February 1, 2009.

Her research interests are in social and relational theory, urban sociology, and social policy. In the broad field of urban studies, Blokland is especially interested in urban inequalities and marginalization processes, place making, neighborhood change and neighborhood cohesion.

== Selected bibliography ==
- Urban Bonds. Polity Press. Cambridge, Oxford, Malden, 2003
- Facing Violence: Everyday Risks in an American Housing Project. In: Sociology, 42 (4), 601–617, 2008 [Winner of the Sage Best Paper in Sociology 2008]
- Networked Urbanism. Social Capital in the city. Hampshire: Ashgate, 2008
- Community as Urban Practice. Cambridge, Polity, 2017
- Leben zwischen Dreck und Drogen, Logos Verlag Berlin, 2021. ISBN 978-3-8325-5310-4; DOI 10.30819/5310.
