= Proto-Karelian language =

Ancestor of modern Karelian

- Region: Lake Ladoga
- Reconstructed ancestors: Proto-Uralic: Proto-Finnic; Proto Northern Finnic

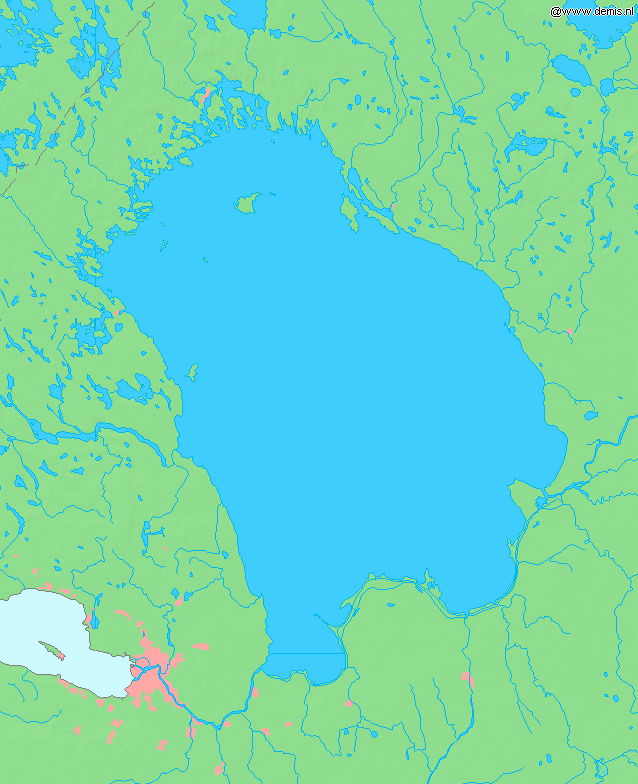
Lake Ladoga, where Old Karelian was spoken.

Proto-Karelian, also known as Old Karelian, was a language once spoken on the western shore of Lake Ladoga in Karelia, from which the dialects of the Karelian language (White, Southern and Livvi), Ludic, the Ingrian language, as well as the South Karelian and Savonian dialects of the Finnish language have developed. It was spoken around the 12th and 13th centuries. The Eastern Finnish dialects developed from Proto-Karelian when the language of the inhabitants who had moved to the area around present-day Mikkeli mixed with western, likely Tavastian, speakers of Finnish. The Livvi-Karelian dialect and Ludic developed from the mixture of the old Vepsian language spoken by the Vepsians of the Olonets Isthmus and Proto-Karelian. Old Karelian speakers also moved to the Tornevalley region, whose influence is seen in Meänkieli toponyms such as Seittenkaari.

Innovations in Proto-Karelian include: the disappearance of *d and *g between vowels, the plural stem *-lOi-, the labialization of *e in post-syllables before labial consonants and the use of "männä" (with ä instead of e) for the word "mennä" (to go). The Old Karelian language had already been in contact with Old Russian speakers within its early stages.
