= List of Uralic languages =

Uralic is a language family whose languages are spoken in Central Europe, Northern Europe, Eastern Europe, and northern Asia, in the countries of Finland, Estonia and Hungary (where Uralic languages are spoken by the majority of the population). In other countries Uralic languages are spoken by a minority of the population, these languages are spoken in northern Norway (in most of the Finnmark region and other regions of the far-north), in northern Sweden (in some areas of Norrland), and in Russia (where Uralic languages are also spoken by a minority of its population, although there is a significant number of speakers in some Federal subjects - republics and autonomous districts or autonomous okrugs of Northern Russia, these languages are spoken in Udmurtia, Komi Republic, Mordvinia, Mari-El, Karelia, in Khanty-Mansi Autonomous Okrug, Yamal-Nenets Autonomous Okrug and Taymyr Autonomous Okrug and also in the former area of Komi-Permyak Autonomous Okrug, now part of the Perm Krai, other areas where Uralic languages are spoken in Russia are for example the Kola Peninsula). In Latvia, in some of the far-northern coastal areas of Courland (Kurzeme) region, a dead Uralic language was spoken: Livonian.

Uralic languages are spoken by about 25 million people. The main Uralic languages in number of speakers are Hungarian (12-13 million), Finnish (5.4 million) and Estonian (1.1 million), that are also national and official languages of sovereign states.

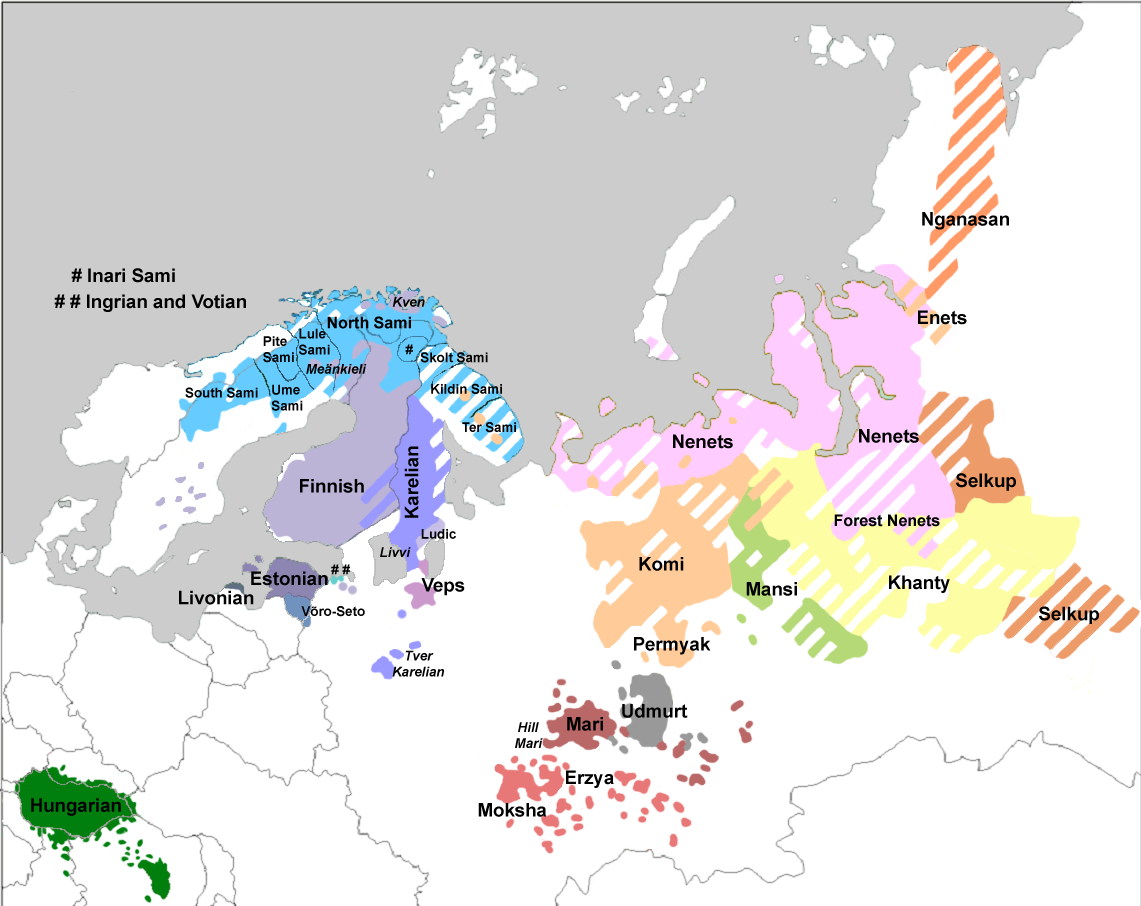
Geographical distribution of the Uralic languages

== Ancestral ==
- Proto-Uralic

== Samoyedic ==
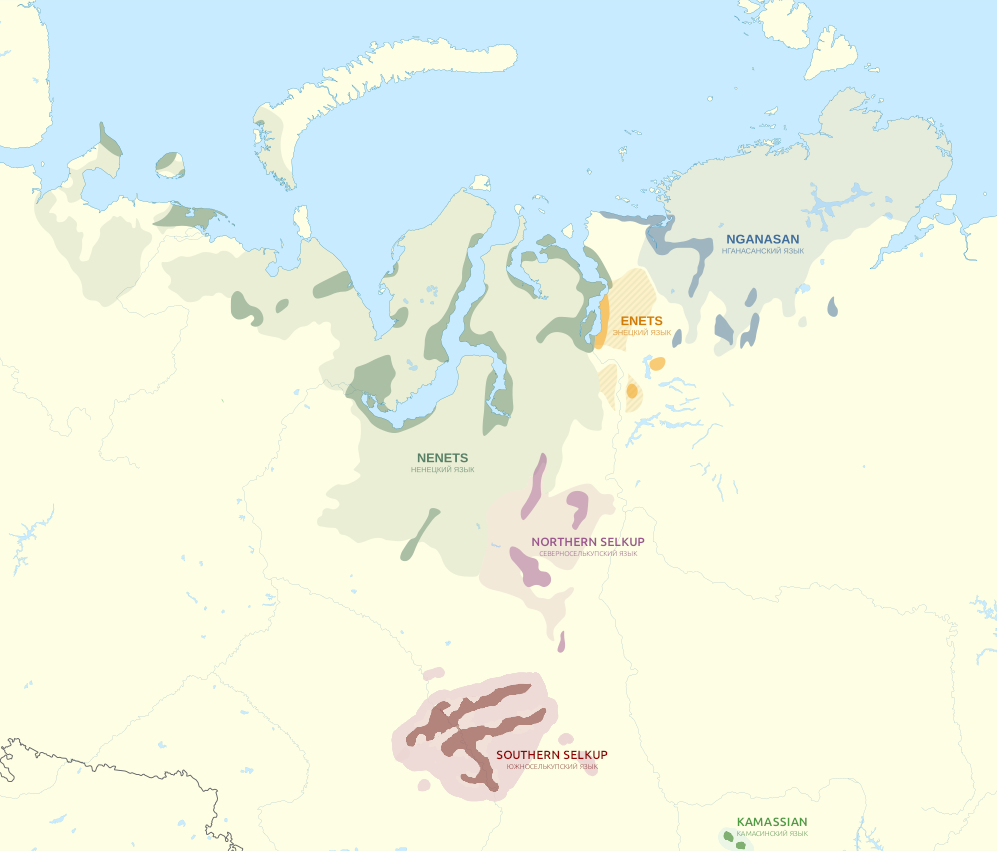
The distribution of Samoyedmic Languages.

- Proto-Samoyedic (ancestral)
  - Nganasan (Tavgy, Tavgi, Tawgi, Tawgi-Samoyed) (Njaʔ / Ŋanasan Næ’)
    - Avam
    - Vadey
  - Mator (Motor, Taigi, Karagas) (extinct)
    - Mator proper / Motor
    - Taygi
    - Karagas
  - Core Samoyedic
    - Nenets-Enets
      - Nenets (Yurak)
        - Forest Nenets (Nešaŋ wata)
        - Tundra Nenets (N’enytsia Wada / Nenyotsya’’ Wada)
      - Transitional Nenets-Enets
        - Yurats (extinct)
      - Enets (Yenets, Yenisei-Samoyed)
        - Forest Enets (Bay Ona’ Bazaan)
        - Tundra Enets (Madu Ona’ Bazaan)
    - Selkup-Kamas
      - Selkup (Ostyak-Samoyed) (Šöl’ Qumyt Əty)
        - Northern Selkup
        - Central Selkup
        - Southern Selkup (not to be confused with Ket)
      - Kamas (extinct)
        - Kamassian proper
        - Koibal/Koybal

== Ob-Ugric ==
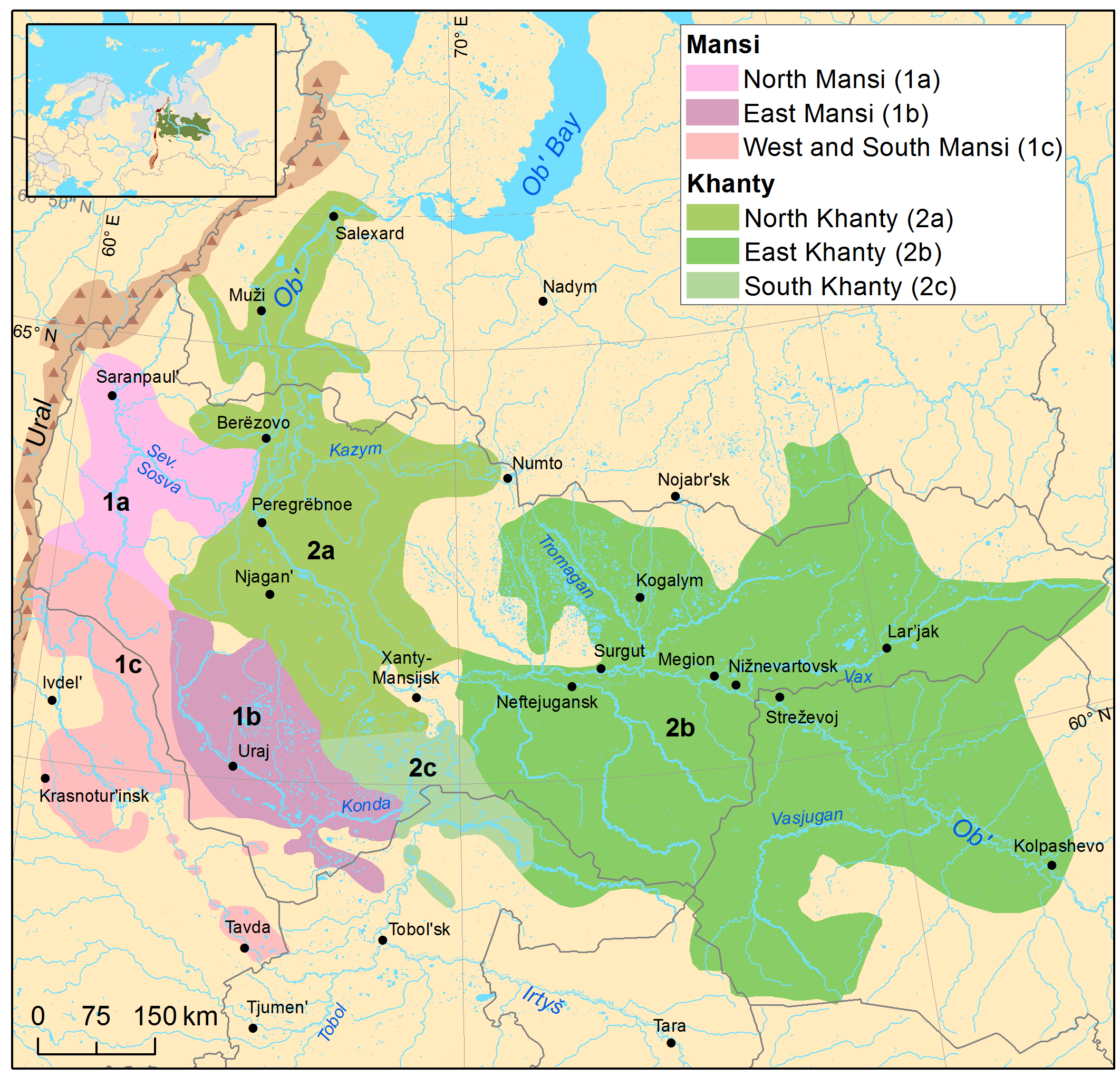
Ob-Ugric languages at the beginning of the 20th century

- Proto-Ob-Ugric (ancestral)
  - Mansi (Vogul) (a group of related languages, not a single language)
    - Southern Mansi (all extinct)
      - Chusovaya (spoken in the western slopes of the Ural Mountains, to the east of Kama river, in the European side)
      - Tagil
      - Tura
      - Tavda (Tavdin)
    - Core Mansi
      - Central Mansi
        - Western Mansi (extinct) (Маньсь Льӓх | Man's' L'äh)
          - Vishera (spoken in the western slopes of the Ural Mountains, to the east of Kama river, in the European side)
          - Pelym
          - North Vagilsk
          - South Vagilsk
          - Lower Lozva
          - Middle Lozva
        - Eastern Mansi (Kondin) (extinct) (Маньсь Лынгх | Man's' Liŋh)
          - Lower Konda
          - Middle Konda
          - Upper Konda
          - Jukonda
      - Northern Mansi (Ма̄ньси Ла̄тыӈ | Maan's'i Laatyŋ) (base of the standard and literary Mansi language)
        - Upper Lozva
        - Sosva
        - Sygva
        - Ob
  - Khanty (Ostyak) (Hantĭ jasaŋ / Khantõ Yasõŋ / Kantõk Yasõŋ) (a group of related languages, not a single language)
    - Western Khanty
      - Northern Khanty
        - Obdorsk/Obdorian (Salekhard Khanty)
        - Berjozov (Synja, Muzhi, Shurishkar), Kazym, Sherkal (Ob dialects)
      - Transitional Northern-Southern Khanty
        - Atlym-Nizyam Khanty
          - Atlym
          - Nizyam
      - Southern Khanty (Irtysh Khanty) (extinct)
        - Upper Demjanka
        - Lower Demjanka
        - Konda
        - Cingali
        - Krasnojarsk
    - Transitional Western-Eastern Khanty
      - Salym Khanty
    - Eastern Khanty
      - Surgut Khanty
        - Jugan
        - Malij Jugan
        - Pim
        - Likrisovskoe
        - Tremjugan / Tromagan
      - Far Eastern Khanty
        - Vakh
        - Vasjugan
        - Verkhne-Kalimsk
        - Vartovskoe

== Magyar ==
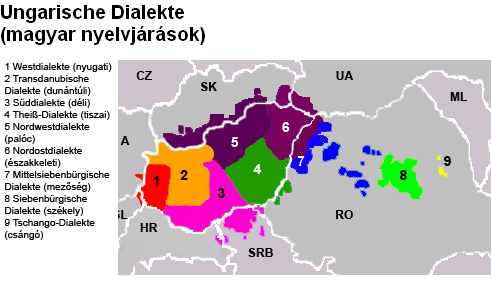
The Hungarian dialects in Hungary and other countries according to an older Hungarian distribution

- Proto-Hungarian (Proto-Magyar)
  - Old Hungarian (ancestral)
    - Hungarian (Magyar) (Magyar Nyelv)
      - Northeast Hungary (Északkeleti)
      - Palóc (Northwest) (Hungarian dialect with Cuman = Polovtsian, Khazar, Kabar and Pecheneg Turkic substrates, especially in Jász-Nagykun-Szolnok, in Jászság there is a Hungarian dialect with an Ossetian Sarmatian substrate)
      - Tisza–Körös (Tiszai)
      - Southern Great Plain
      - Southern Transdanubian
      - Central Transdanubian – Little Hungarian Plain
      - Western Transdanubian
      - Transylvanian Plain
      - Székely (East Transylvanian)
      - Csángó (West Moldavian Hungarian)

== Permic ==
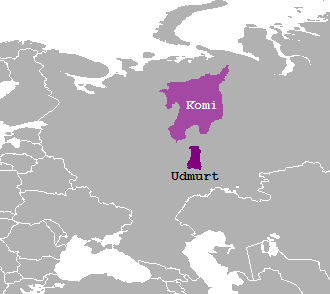
Geographical distribution of Permic languages.

- Proto-Permic (ancestral)
  - Udmurt (Votyak) (Udmurt kyl)
    - Southern Udmurt
    - Northern Udmurt (spoken along Cheptsa River)
    - Besermyan (spoken by the strongly Turkified Besermyans)
  - Komi (Komi kyv)
    - Komi-Permyak (Perem Komi kyv)
      - Southern
        - /v/ type
          - Kudymkar-Inva
          - Lower Inva
        - Southern (/l/ type)
          - On
          - Nerdva
      - Northern
        - /l/ type
          - Upper Lupya
          - Mysy (former rural council)
          - Kosa-Kama
          - Kochevo
          - Zyuzdino (Afanasyevo)
          - Yazva
    - Komi-Yodzyak (Yodzyak, Komi-Jazva, Vishera) (Komi-Yodz kyl)
    - Komi-Zyryan (Komi, Komi-Zyrian, Zyrian) (basis of the standard literary language) (Komi kyv)
      - Old Komi (written in the Old Permic script) (extinct)
      - Syktyvkar
      - Lower Vychegda
      - Central Vychegda
      - Luza-Letka
      - Upper Sysola
      - Upper Vychegda
      - Pechora
      - Izhma (spoken by the Izhma Komi)
      - Vym
      - Udora

== Mari ==
The four main dialects of Mari. Hill Mari North-Western Mari Meadow Mari Eastern Mari

(Mari dialect continuum)

- Proto-Mari (ancestral)
  - Mari (Cheremis) (Marii jõlme) (a group of related languages, not a single language)
    - Eastern-Meadow Mari
      - Eastern Mari
      - Meadow Mari (Olykmarla)
        - Meadow Mari Proper
        - Sernur-Morkin
        - Volga
        - Yoshkar-Olin
    - Transitional Meadow Mari-Hill Mari
      - Northwestern Mari (Jůtnṳ̊mäl-käsvel Mare jÿlmÿ)
        - Yaransk dialect (the largest by number of speakers and spread territory, Northwestern Mari standardized variety)
          - Kiknur subdialect
          - Tuzha subdialect
          - Sanchursk subdialect
        - Tonshaevo dialect
        - Lipsha dialect
        - Sharanga dialect
    - Hill Mari / Western Mari (Kyryk Mary jÿlmÿ)
      - Kozymodemyan
      - Yaran

== Mordvinic ==
Mordvinic languages in Mordovia Moksha Erzya

- Proto-Mordvinic (ancestral)
  - Erzya (Eŕźań keľ)
    - Central group (E-I)
    - Western group (E-II)
    - Northern group (E-III)
    - Southeastern group (E-IV)
    - Shoksha (E-V)
  - Moksha (Mokšəń käľ)
    - Central group (M-I)
    - Western group (M-II)
    - South-Eastern group (M-III)

== Finnic ==
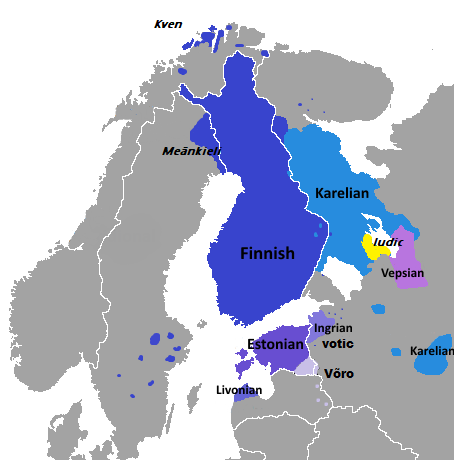
Geographical distribution of Finnic languages.

Map of Finnish dialects

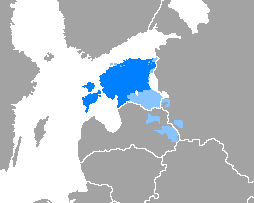
North Estonian and South Estonian languages.

(Finnic dialect continuum)

- Proto-Finnic (ancestral)
  - Inland Finnic
    - South Estonian (Lõuna Eesti kiil)
      - Eastern South Estonian
        - Kraasna (extinct)
        - Ludza (extinct)
        - Seto
        - Võro
      - Leivu (extinct)
      - Mulgi
      - Tartu
  - Coastal Finnic
    - Gulf of Riga Finnic
      - Livonian (Līvõ kēļ / Rānda keel) (extinct)
        - Courland Livonian (extinct) (with revival attempts)
        - Salaca Livonian (extinct)
    - Gulf of Finland Finnic
      - Central Finnic
        - Estonian (North Estonian) (Eesti keel)
          - Central Estonian (basis of Standard Estonian but not identical)
          - Eastern Estonian
          - Insular Estonian
          - Western Estonian
        - Northeastern coastal Estonian (?) (Kirderannikumurre)
          - Alutaguse dialect
          - Coastal
        - Votic (Vad’d’a tšeeli / Mā tšeeli / Vadyan cheeli / Vadyaa cheli) (nearly extinct)
          - Eastern Votic (extinct)
          - Western Votic
          - Krevinian (extinct)
          - Kukkuzi (?) (possibly extinct)
      - Northern Finnic
        - Finnish (Suomi / Suomen kieli)
          - Standard Finnish - Yleiskieli
          - American Finnish
          - Colloquial Finnish - Puhekieli - spoken language
            - Western dialects
              - Southwestern dialects (Lounaismurteet)
                - Southern dialect group
                - Northern dialect group
              - Southwestern transitional dialects
                - Pori region dialects
                - Ala-Satakunta dialects
                - dialects of Turku highlands
                - Somero region dialects
                - Western Uusimaa dialects
              - Tavastian dialects (Hämäläismurteet)
                - Ylä-Satakunta dialects
                - Heart Tavastian dialects
                - Southern Tavastian dialects
                - Southeastern Tavastian dialects
                  - Hollola dialect group
                  - Porvoo dialect group
                  - Iitti dialect group
              - Southern Botnian (Ostrobothnian) dialects (Eteläpohjalaiset murteet)
              - Middle and Northern Botnian (Ostrobothnian) dialects (Keski- ja Pohjoispohjalaiset murteet)
                - Middle Botnian (Ostrobothnian) dialects
                - Northern Botnian (Ostrobothnian) dialects
              - Peräpohjola dialects (Peräpohjalaiset murteet) Far-Northern dialects
                - Tornio dialects ("Meänkieli" in Sweden) (Tornedalian / Tornedalian Finnish)
                - Kemi dialects
                - Kemijärvi dialects
                - Jällivaara dialects ("Meänkieli" in Sweden) (Tornedalian / Tornedalian Finnish)
                - Ruija dialects ("Kven language" in Northern Norway) (Kven Finnish) (Kvääni / Kväänin kieli / Kainu / Kainun kieli)
            - Eastern dialects
              - Savonian dialects (Savolaismurteet)
                - Northern Savonian dialects
                - Southern Savonian dialects
                - Middle dialects of Savonlinna region
                - Eastern Savonian dialects or the dialects of North Karelia
                - Kainuu dialects
                - Central Finland dialects
                - Päijänne Tavastia dialects
                - Keuruu-Evijärvi dialects
                - Savonian dialects of Värmland (Sweden) (once spoken by the Forest Finns - Metsäsuomalaiset)
                - Värmland Savonian dialect (extinct)
              - Southeastern dialects (Kaakkoismurteet)
                - Proper Southeastern dialects
                - Middle dialects of Lemi region
                - Ingrian dialects (in Russia)
        - Ingrian (Ižoran keeli)
          - Hevaha (extinct)
          - Lower Luga
          - Kukkuzi (?) (possibly extinct)
          - Orodezhi (Upper Luga) (extinct)
          - Soikkola dialect
        - Karelian (Karjala / Kariela / Karjalan kielii) (not to be confused with the Karelian dialects of Finnish although there is some dialect continuum between the two)
          - Livvi (Olonets Karelian) (Livvi / Livvin kieli)
          - Karelian proper (Karjala / Kariela / Karjalan kielii)
            - Northern Karelian (Viena)
            - Southern Karelian
              - Tver Karelian
        - Vepsian
          - Ludic (Lüüdi / Lüüdi kiel)
            - Northern Ludic
            - Central Ludic
            - Kuuďärv Ludic
          - Veps (Vepsän kelʹ / Vepsän kel')
            - Northern Veps (Onega Veps)
            - Central Veps
            - Southern Veps

== Sami ==
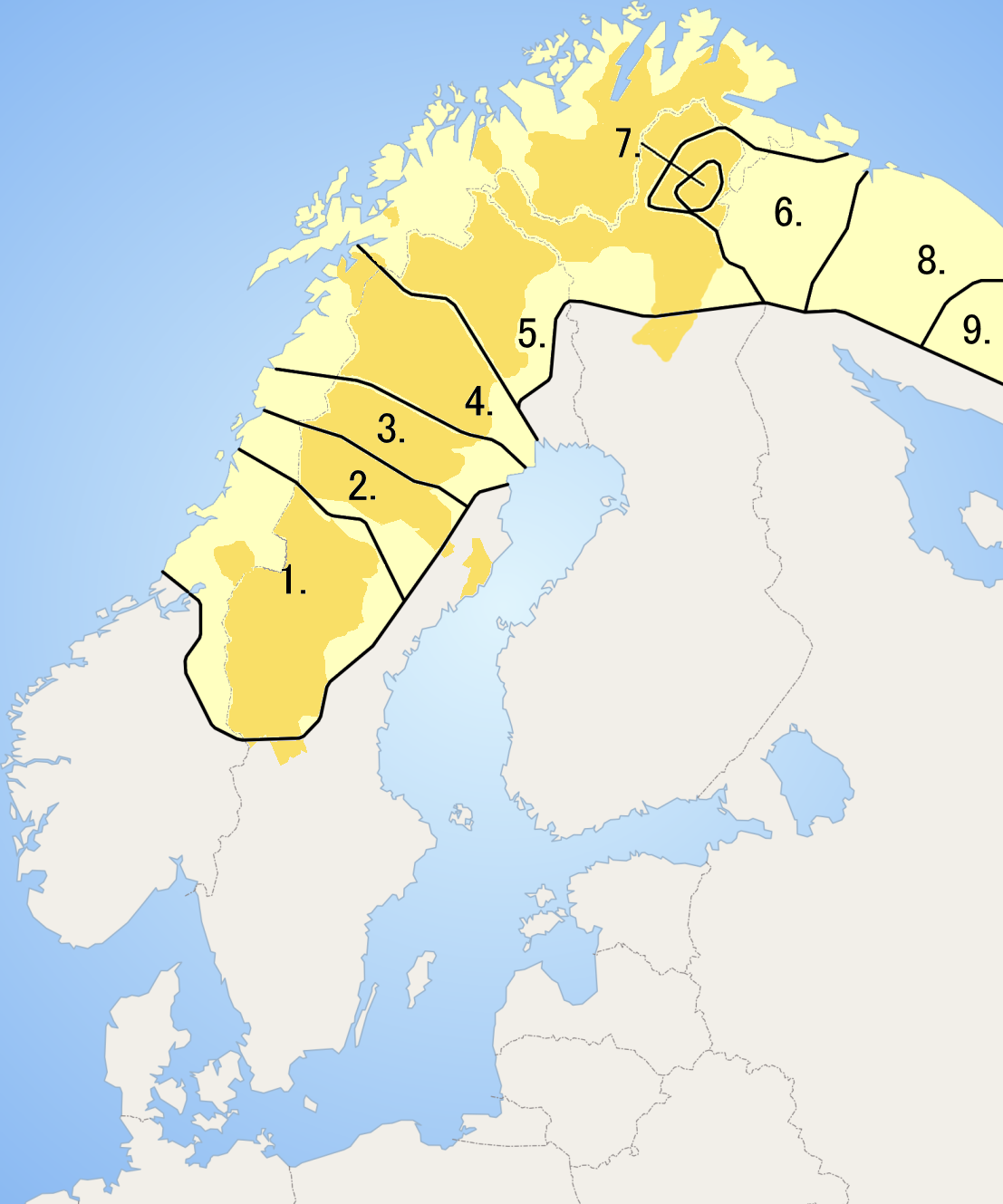
Recent distribution of the Sami languages: 1. Southern Sami, 2. Ume Sami, 3. Pite Sami, 4. Lule Sami, 5. Northern Sami, 6. Skolt Sami, 7. Inari Sami, 8. Kildin Sami, 9. Ter Sami. Darkened area represents municipalities that recognize Sami as an official or minority language.

(Sami dialect continuum)

- Proto-Sami (ancestral)
  - Eastern Sami
    - Mainland
      - Inari Sami (Anarâškielâ)
      - Kemi Sami (extinct)
      - Skolt Sami (Sääʹmǩiõll / Nuõrttsääʹmǩiõll)
      - Akkala Sami (extinct) (Са̄мь кел / Ӓ̄һкельса̄мь кел)
      - Kainuu Sami (extinct)
    - Peninsular (Kola Sámi)
      - Kildin Sami (Са̄мь кӣлл / Кӣллтса̄мь кӣлл)
      - Ter Sami (Са̄ме кӣлл / Тарьеса̄ме кӣлл)
  - Western Sami languages
    - Northwestern
      - Northern Sami (Davvisámegiella)
        - Torne Sami
        - Finnmark Sami
        - Sea Sami
      - Northwestern proper
        - Lule Sami (Julevsámegiella)
          - Northern dialects: Sörkaitum, Sirkas and Jåkkåkaska in Sweden, Tysfjord in Norway
          - Southern dialects: Tuorpon in Sweden
          - Forest dialects: Gällivare and Serri in Sweden
        - Pite Sami (Bidumsámegiella)
          - Northern dialects: Luokta-Mávas in Sweden
          - Central dialects: Semisjaur-Njarg in Sweden
          - Southern dialects: Svaipa in Sweden
    - Southwestern
      - Ume Sami (Ubmejesámiengiälla)
        - Northwestern
        - Southeastern
      - Southern Sami (Åarjelsaemien gïele)
        - Åsele dialect (Northern dialect)
        - Jämtland dialect (Southern dialect)
      - Gävle Sami (extinct)

== Unclassified extinct languages ==
Uralic languages whose relationship to other languages in the family is unclear:

- Merya (spoken by the Merya, may have been a western branch of the Mari or close to the Mordvinic languages, may have been a transitional language between the Volga and the Baltic Finns)
- Meshchera (spoken by the Meshchera, may have been related to the Mordvinic languages or to the Permic languages)
- Muromian (spoken by the Muroma, may have been a language close to the Merya and a transitional language between the Volga and the Baltic Finns)

== See also ==
- Uralic languages

By ISO 639-3 code
Enter an ISO code to find the corresponding language article.
