= Gauja Estonians =

Ethnic group in Latvia

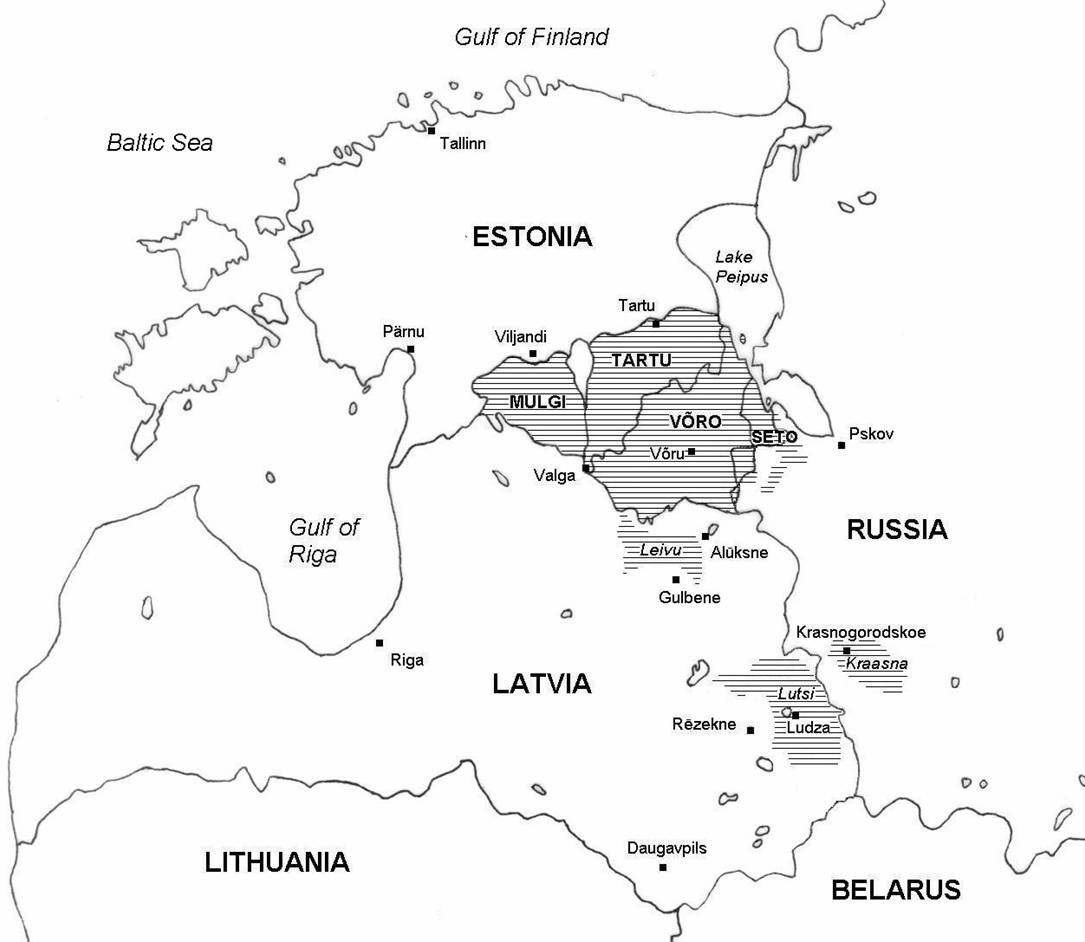
- Southern Estonian language area, Gauja Estonians in north eastern corner of Latvia

Total population
- none

Regions with significant populations
- Latvia

Languages
- Formerly Leivu dialect, Latvian

Religion
- Lutheran

Related ethnic groups
- other Baltic Finns

Gauja Estonians (Estonian: Koiva maarahvas, Leivu maarahvas or leivud; Latvian: Vidzemes igauņi – 'Vidzeme Estonians' or leivi) were Estonians who lived along Gauja river in Latvia.

== History ==
Gauja Estonians are most likely native to their homelands. There are mentions of Chudes living in Adzele county from 12th century Russian sources. There are later mentions of them living in the Gauja river area. According to August Wilhelm Hupel's book Topographische Nachrichten von Lief und Ehstland there were about thousand Estonians in 1777. Anders Johan Sjögren claimed that there were 2,600 Gauja Estonians in 1849. Heikki Ojansuu counted only 116 when he made a trip to an area in 1911. According to Ojansuu's theory, Gauja Estonians were refugees of the Great Northern War from Southern Estonia, but today this theory has been largely discredited. According to Harri Moora and Paul Ariste, Gauja Estonians were the original inhabitants of their homelands.

== Language ==
The last known speaker of local dialect, Anton Bok, died on April 20, 1988. The dialect was similar to those spoken in Southern Estonia, more accurately to southern Estonian subdialect of Hargla. It had some grammatical and phonological loans from the Latvian language and possibly some from Livonian.
