= Centre for South Estonian Language and Cultural Studies =

Unit of Tartu University

The Centre for South Estonian Language and Cultural Studies is an interdisciplinary unit at the Faculty of Philosophy of Tartu University. The centre coordinates and organizes linguistic and cultural studies in the historical South Estonian (Võro, Seto, Mulgi and Tartu) area. The centre also publishes books and organizes events connected with South Estonian language and culture.
