= Setos =

Ethnic group in Estonia

Setos setokõsõq setukesed
- Flag of the Seto People

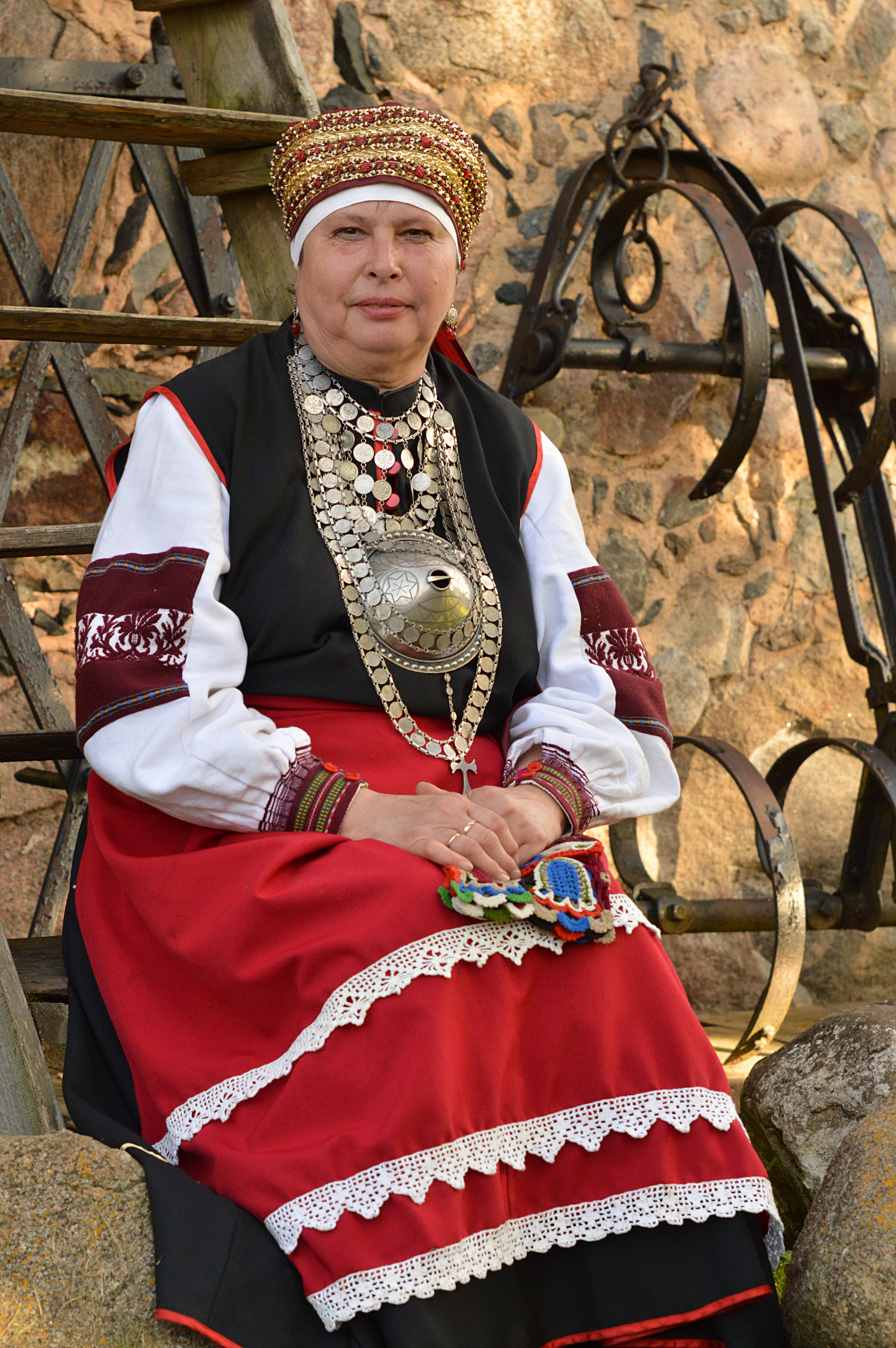
- Seto woman during Radaja Seto Festival

Total population
- 12,800

Regions with significant populations
- Setomaa
- Estonia: 12,500
- Russia: 234 (2020)

Languages
- Seto, Estonian, Russian

Religion
- Eastern Orthodox, Native Faith

Related ethnic groups
- Other Baltic Finns; Especially Estonians, Livonians, Võros, and Votians

Setos (Seto: setokõsõq, setoq, Estonian: setukesed, setud) are an indigenous Finnic people and ethnic minority that have historically lived in the borderlands between modern day Estonia and Russia. Setos have historically spoken the Seto language and been Orthodox Christians. The Seto language (like Estonian and Finnish) belongs to the Finnic group of the Uralic language family. Since the early 2000s, the Setos have sought greater recognition, rather than having their language considered a dialect of Estonian. Eastern Orthodox Christianity, with influences from local folk religions is widely practiced by the Seto peoples. Although the Setos have been officially recognized as a protected indigenous minority by the Russian Federation since 2010, the government of Estonia does not recognize them as an ethnic group.

The ancestral homes of many Setos can be found to the south of Lake Peipus, in the Setomaa region. After 1991 however, this territory was divided between the newly independent Estonia (Põlva and Võro counties) and the north-western sections of the Russian Federation (Pechorsky District of Pskov Oblast).

== Ethnic history ==
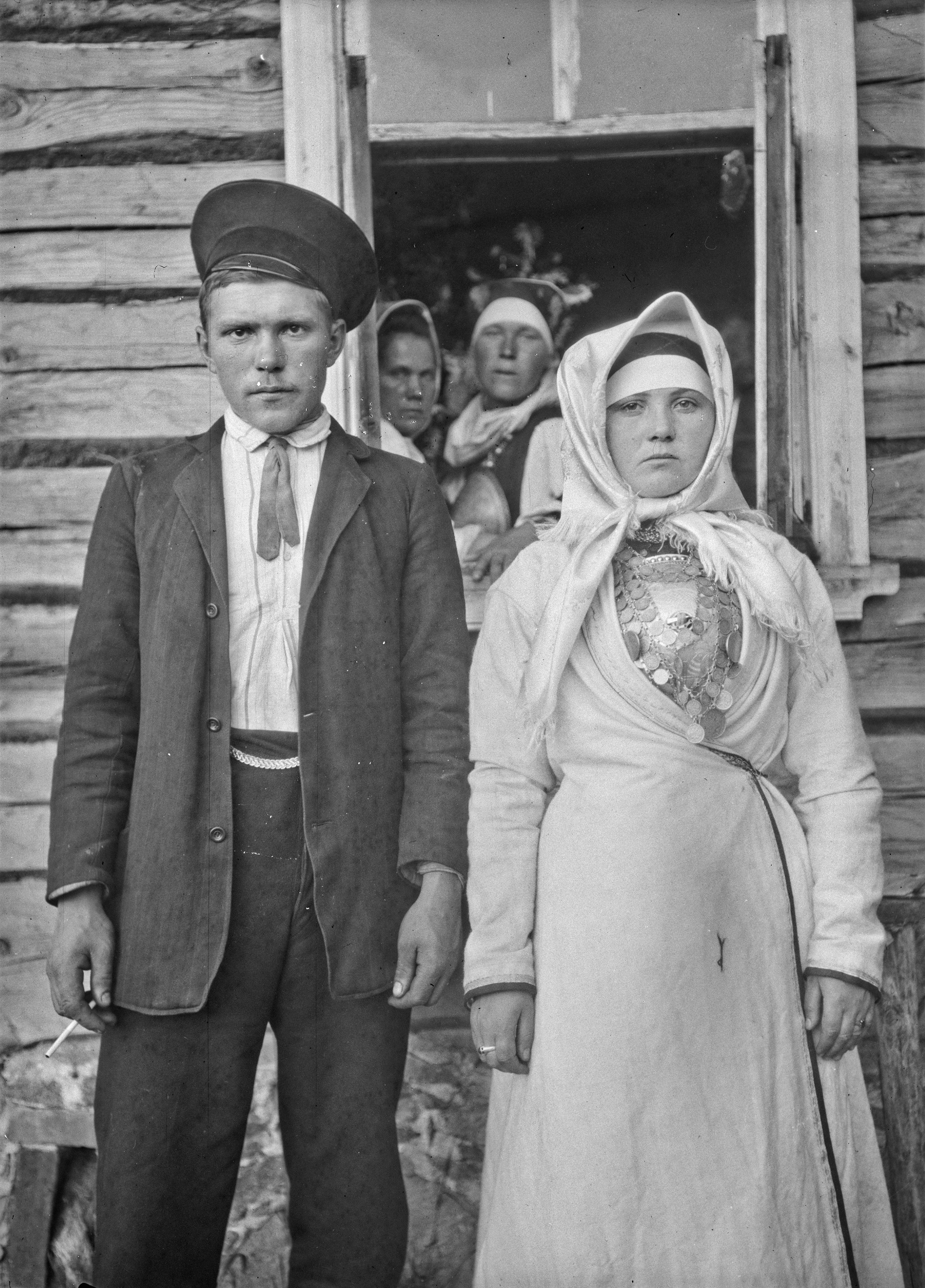
A Seto wedding in Värska in 1912. The bride and groom are dressed in traditional period wedding attire.

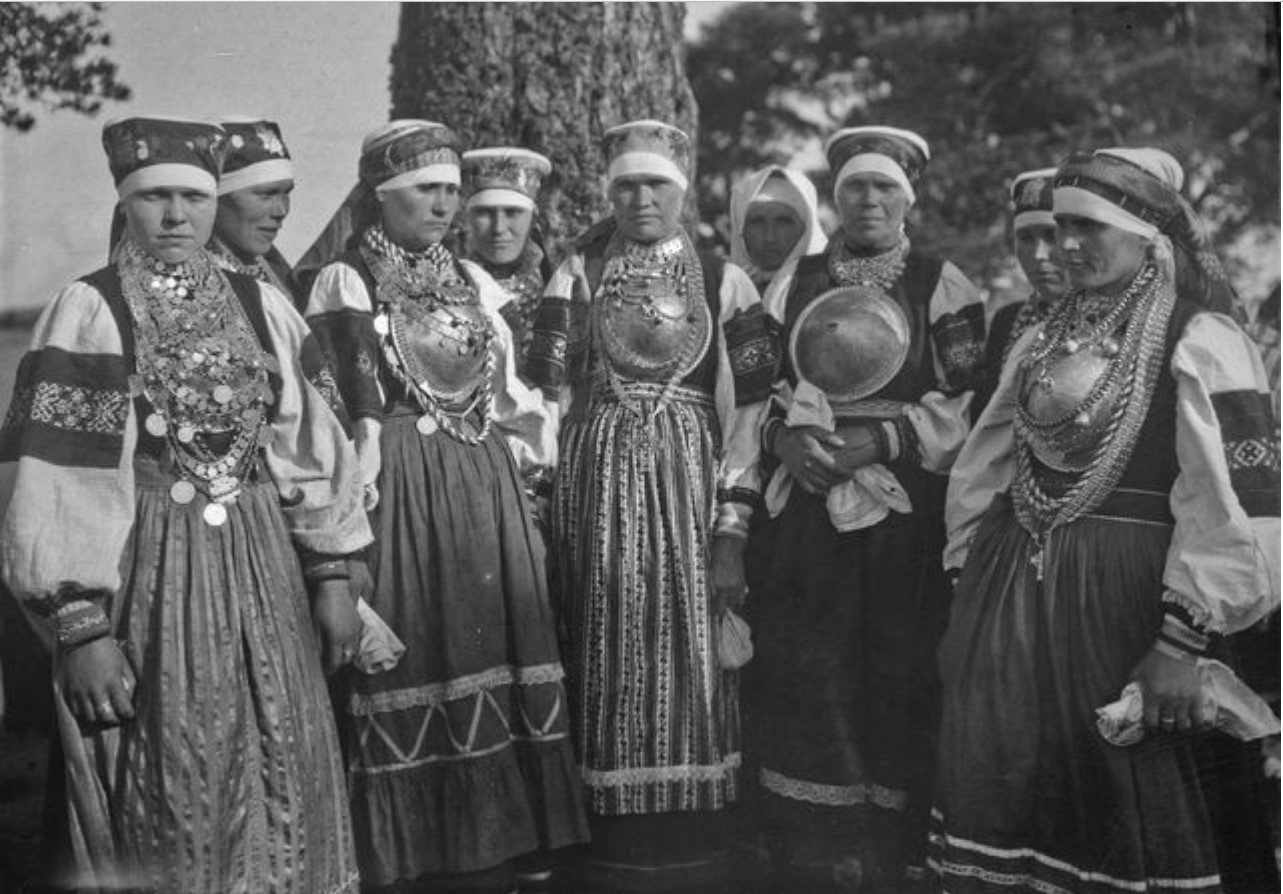
Attendants of the 1912 Värska wedding in traditional Seto dress.

The definitive origin of the Seto people is unknown to researchers, only that they first emerged in Setomaa around the Piusa River. This was an area that was an intersection between the Finnic peoples and the Balts.

During the 13th century, the majority of Estonians along the coasts were converted to Catholicism during the Livonian Crusade led by the Teutonic Order. During this time, the majority of Setos lived under the Novgorod Republic and remained followers of their native Finnic religion. Over the next two hundred years, the Setos were converted to Orthodox Christianity due to the influence from the neighboring Slavic states, but incorporated elements of their earlier pre-Christian religion. An early prevailing belief of the origin of the Seto community was that they were ethnic Estonians who had migrated east and adopted Orthodox Christianity under the influence of the Novgorod Republic.

The cultural development of the Setos blossomed in the early 20th century when many national societies were organized. In 1905, the number of Setos reached its peak. After the proclamation of independence of Estonia, the authorities adopted a policy of Estonification of its population, which eventually led to decline of the Setos as a distinctive community within Estonia. In Russia, due to the influence of Estonian language schools, high rates of inter-community marriages, and emigration to Estonia, the number of self-identifying Setos decreased as well.

Setos are an officially protected ethnic minority in the Russian Pskov Oblast, and a linguistic minority within Estonia. In 2002, at the sixth Seto Congress the Setos declared their intent to identify as a separate people group. In a 2011 census, it was discovered that nearly two-thirds of the nearly 12,500 Seto speaking population in Estonia lived outside the historically Seto regions. This resulted in two distinct communities of Setos to emerge according to research conducted by Pille Runnel, the first being the Seto who had migrated away from Setomaa and had to recreate a communal and religious identity. The second group being the Seto people who continued to live in older communities in Setomaa.

== Border Disputes ==
In 1920, with the peace treaty of Tartu, the area Setomaa (Setoland) was ceded to the newly created Republic of Estonia and it was included into Petseri County. As a result of World War II, the Republic of Estonia was forcibly annexed by the Soviet Union. And on August 15, 1944, the border between the Estonian Soviet Socialist Republic and the Russian Soviet Federated Socialist Republic was revised by Moscow authorities to what it is now. The issue became topical as the Republic of Estonia was restored in the borders of the Estonian Soviet Socialist Republic in 1991, and a national border was established soon afterwards.

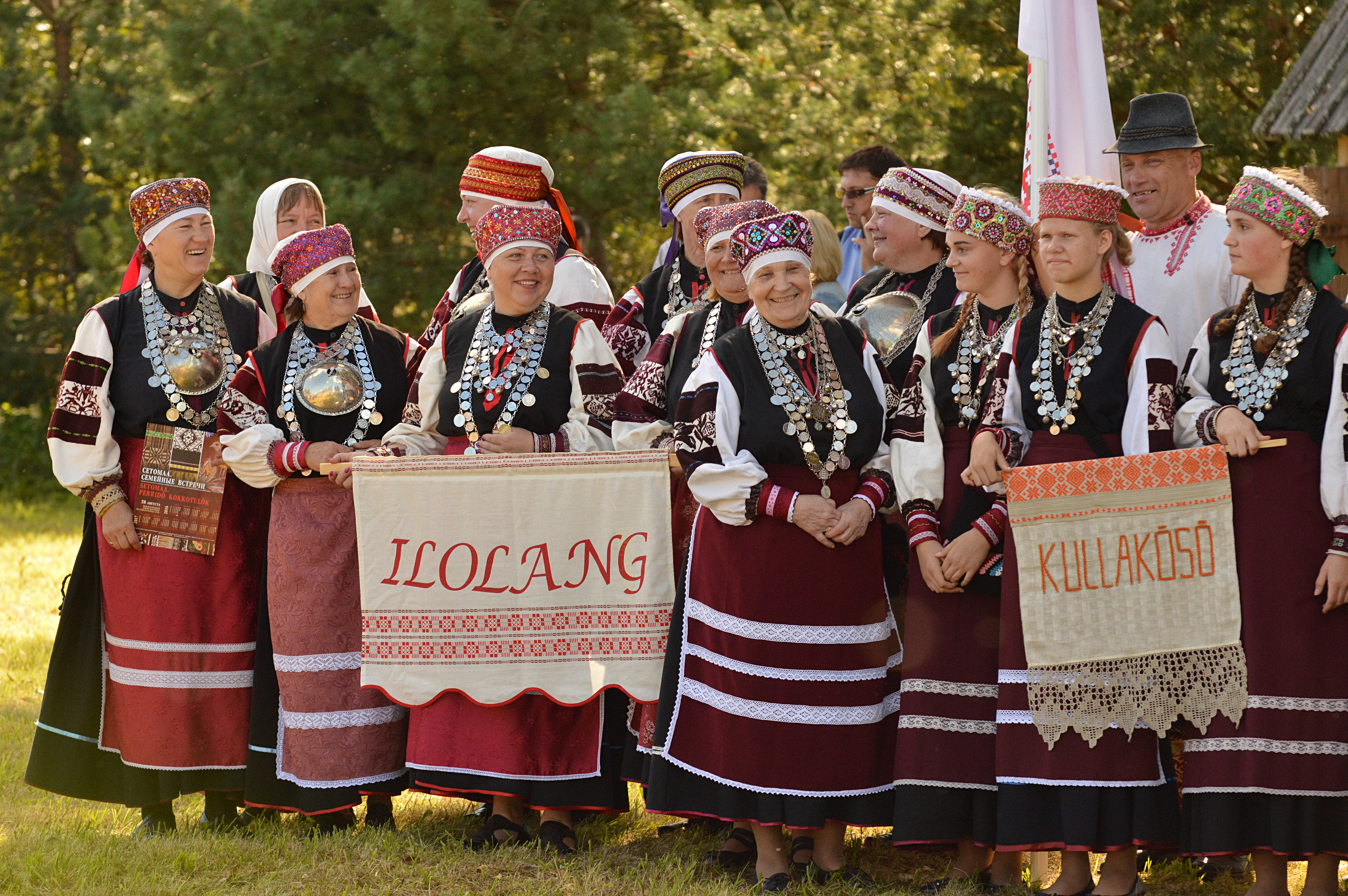
Setos in Radaja Seto Festival in 2016

== Seto leelo ==
In 2009, the Setos' polyphonic style of folk singing, called leelo, was added to the UNESCO list of intangible cultural heritage. Seto leelo is usually performed by women, dressed in traditional clothing. During the Seto Kingdom Day celebration, the winning lead singer of a leelo group is awarded the title Mother of Song.

== Representative organizations ==
The Seto Congress, a body comprising representatives of Seto villages and organizations, is regularly convened every three years and elects a permanent Council of Elders.

The Society for Seto Congress was a member of the European Bureau for Lesser-Used Languages. The Setomaa federation of municipalities in Estonia (Setomaa Valdade Liit, comprising the communes of Mikitämäe, Värska, Meremäe and Misso) publishes the newspaper Setomaa, partly in the Seto language, partly in Estonian.

Also, every year, the Seto choose a steward of King Peko (sootska or ülebtsootska) for the so-called Kingdom of Setomaa at the annual celebration of the Day of the Kingdom (Seto Kuningriigi päiv), a local festival that rotates among the bigger Seto villages. The office is largely ceremonial and has been held by local activists, politicians, entrepreneurs and scholars. The tradition was initiated by Paul Hagu, an ethnic Seto and a researcher of Seto folk songs and traditional vocal polyphony (leelo) at the University of Tartu.

Although modern linguists generally classify Seto as an independent Finnic language rather than a dialect, the Seto language does not hold an official regional status in Estonia, where it is legally treated as a dialect of Estonian.

== Religion ==
The Pskovo-Pechersky Monastery in Petseri has been an important religious and communal center for the Seto peoples. Since medieval times the monastery has owned much of the land and the Seto Churches in the region leading many Seto peasants to view the monastery as the economic and theological center of their community.

In 1920 with the independence of the Republic of Estonia from Soviet Russia, the border was drawn to include the monastery on the Estonia side. This prevented it from being desecrated or demolished by the Soviet forces during the anti-religious campaign from 1921 to 1928. Following the occupation by the German and Soviet forces from 1940 to 1991, the restoration of Estonian independence led the border to be moved, dividing the ancestral Seto lands and placing the monastery on side of the Russian Federation.

With the revival of Seto culture following the fall of the Soviet Union, elements of the pre-Christian religion that were preserved in private during the periods of Christianization and Sovietization began to reemerge. Since 2007, Jumalamägi, God's Hill, an ancient sacred grove that was dedicated to the God-King Peko, who would carry spirits to the afterlife in his horse wagon, has again become a center of communal activity. Recently, a sculpture by local sculptor R. Veeber was erected on the hill and has become an important location for offers to Peko by the local community.

== Genetics ==
Based on 56 samples, the most common mtDNA haplogroup for Setos is H, as 42.9 percent of them belong to it. 33.9 percent of Setos have the haplogroup U, and its most frequently found subclade is U5. Less common mtDNA haplogroups include J, T and V.

== See also ==
- Seto language
- Võro language
- Ludza Estonians
- Kraasna Estonians
