= Kullamaa Manuscript =

Oldest source of long texts in the Estonian language

The Kullamaa Manuscript (Estonian: Kullamaa käsikiri) is a manuscript considered to be the oldest source containing longer texts (in total about 150 words) in Estonian. These texts were written c. 1524–1532 by the clergymen Johannes Lelow and his successor Konderth Gulerth.

The manuscript consists of the Lord's Prayer, the Hail Mary, and the Apostles' Creed.

The texts were discovered in 1923 by Paul Johansen. The texts are held by the Tallinn City Archives.
