= Tartu dialect =

Variety of South Estonian spoken in Tartu

Tartu
- tartu kiil tarto kiil
- Native to: Estonia
- Region: Tartumaa
- Native speakers: 17,310 (2021 census)
- Language family: Uralic: Finnic; South Estonian; Ugala; Ugandi; Tartu
- Standard forms: South Estonian literary language
- Dialects: Sangaste-Karula; Puhja-Rannu; Võnnu-Kambja; Tartu-Maarja; Otepää
- Writing system: Latin

Language codes
- ISO 639-3: –
- Glottolog: tart1244
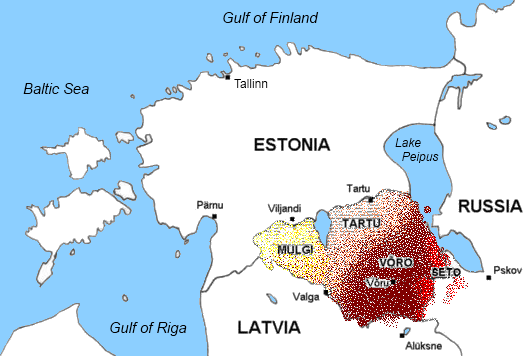
- Linguistic map of southern Estonia. Tartu is found north of the Võro-speaking area.

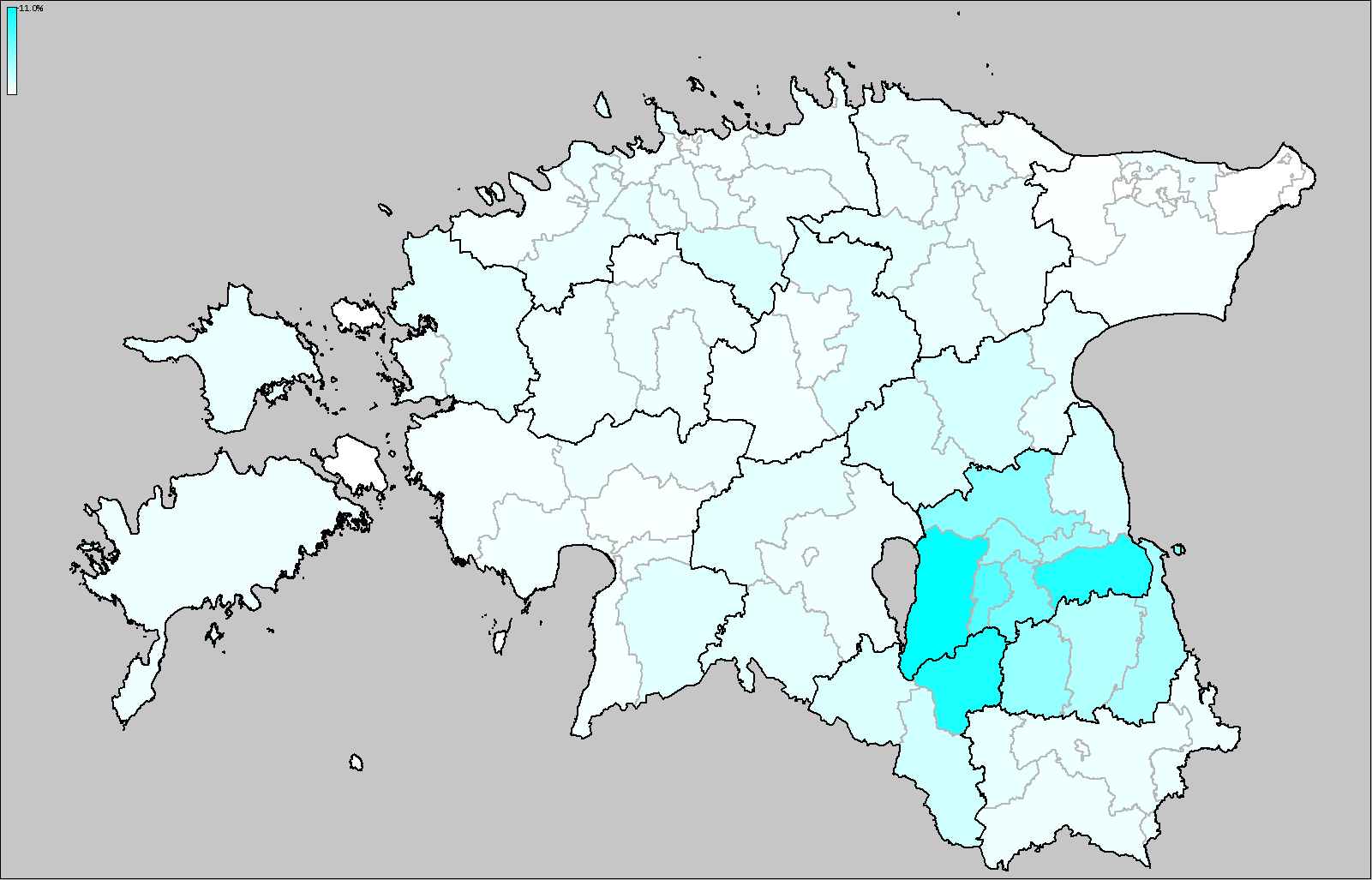
- Distribution of Tartu speakers according to the 2021 census.

The Tartu dialect (Estonian: tartu keel) is a dialect of South Estonian spoken in Estonia, near the city of Tartu. It bears similarities to Mulgi, particularly the Tarvastu and Helme varieties. It has historically, along with northern Võro, been the basis for the South Estonian literary language.

== Usage ==
In the 2011 Estonian census, 4109 people were reported to be speaking the Tartu language, and in the 2021 census 17310 people were reported to have spoken the language.

It reached its peak in the 17th century and declined until the 2000s. Its speaker numbers have been increasing ever since, but the majority of speakers are aging, and there is a lack of media in Tartu. Revival movements for Tartu have not been as strong as those for the Seto, Mulgi and Võro languages.

=== Literature ===
Jakob Hurt's collection "Eesti mõtteloo" contains his sermons in the Rõngu dialect of Tartu. In modern literature, Mats Traat was the main user of Tartu.

== See also ==
- South Estonian

== Sources ==
- Velsker, Mart (7 July 2015). "South Estonian Literature: A New Phenomenon with a Centuries-long History". Interlitteraria. 20 (1): 115. doi:10.12697/IL.2015.20.1.9. ISSN 2228-4729.
