= Kraasna dialect =

Extinct dialect of South Estonian

Kraasna
- Native to: Russia
- Region: Kraasna
- Ethnicity: Kraasna Estonians
- Extinct: late 1930s
- Language family: Uralic: Finnic; South Estonian; Kraasna

Language codes
- ISO 639-3: –
- Glottolog: kraa1234
- IETF: fiu-u-sd-rupsk
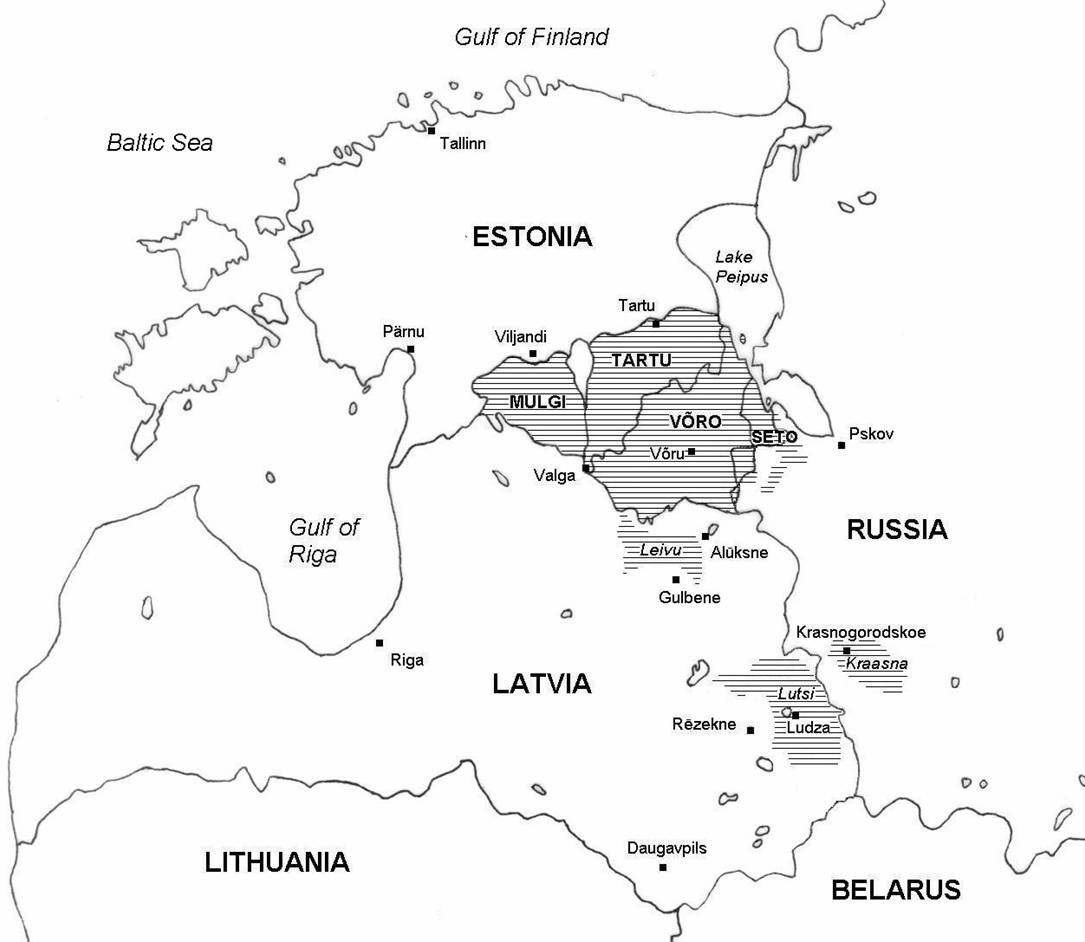
- South Estonian, including Kraasna

Kraasna is an extinct dialect of South Estonian that was spoken in Russia by the Kraasna Estonians who were immigrants to the area. The last native speaker likely died before World War II, but it was still spoken in the 1930s. Kraasna was documented by Oskar Kallas (along with Ludza).

The linguistic enclave was south of the Russian city of Pskov. The Kraasna dialect was first discovered in the year 1849 when Friedrich Reinhold Kreutzwald sent a letter to A.J. Brandt. The Kraasna Estonians arrived to the area at the end of the 16th century speaking a dialect which was close to eastern Seto, but had slight influence from Võro. The Kraasna dialect had an abessive suffix -ldA and the translative marker -st which are linked to Seto.

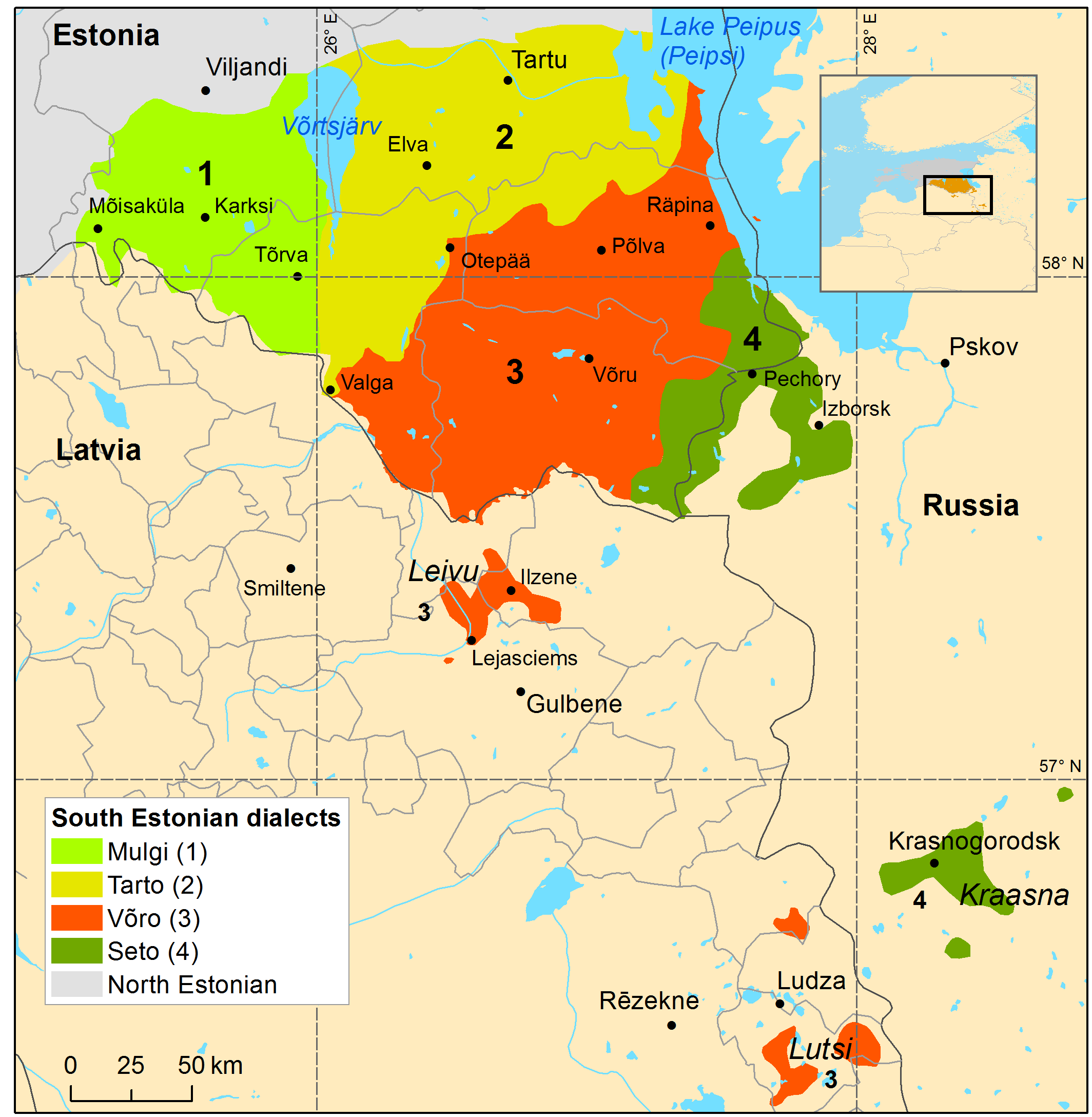
South Estonian dialects at the beginning of the 20th century

== Example ==
Mis om madalamb ma ja pikkemb muist puist?
viŋgjäl tseal om mittu vikka kas om ma külmäne vai om kärz haige
mis peettäs si̮nast ja härg sarvist
vaiv vanas sajja, vanah hüä elo
jalg tümbzähäs, kil limpsahas

== See also ==
- Leivu dialect
- Ludza dialect
