= Leivu dialect =

Extinct dialect of South Estonian

Leivu
- Native to: Latvia
- Region: Gauja
- Ethnicity: Gauja Estonians
- Extinct: 1988, with the death of Anton Bok
- Language family: Uralic: Finnic; South Estonian; Leivu

Language codes
- ISO 639-3: –
- Glottolog: leiv1235
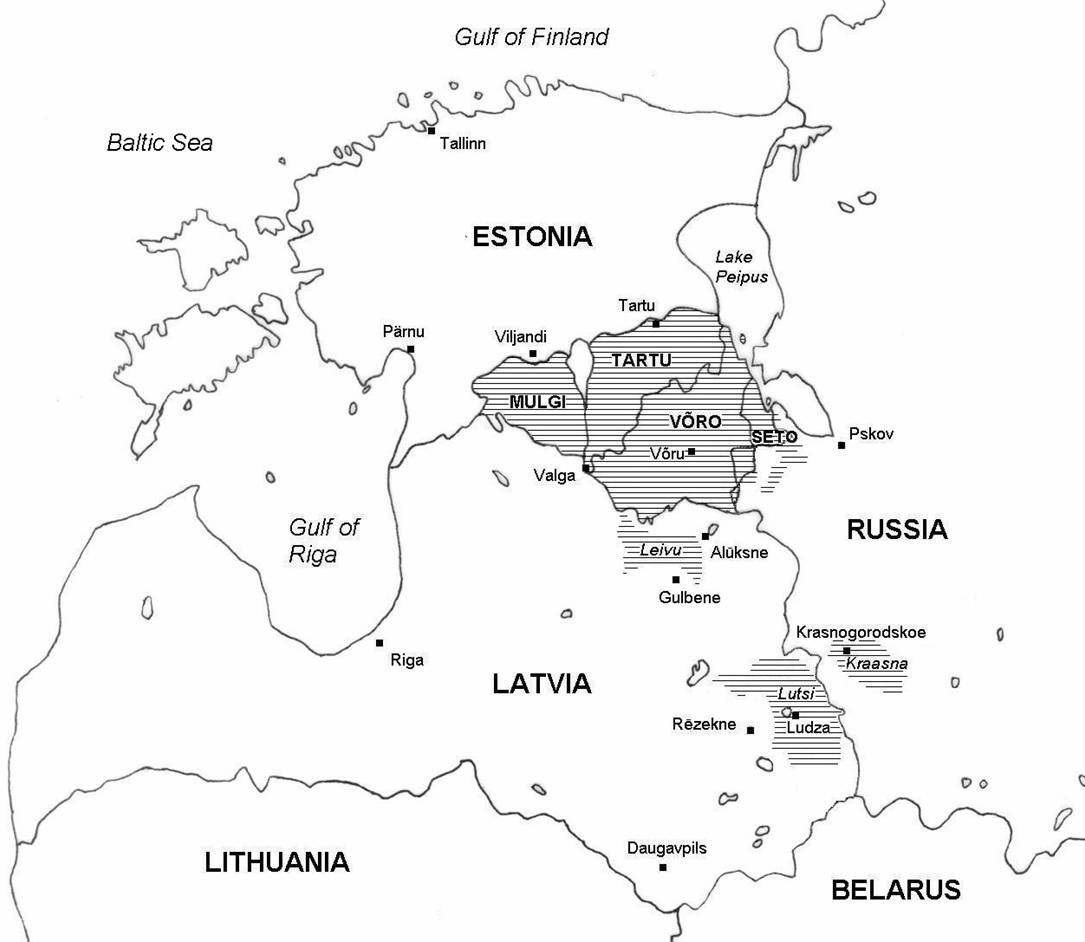
- South Estonian, including Leivu

The Leivu dialect is an extinct dialect of South Estonian that was spoken in North Latvia around the Gauja river by the Gauja Estonians. It became extinct in 1988 when the last speaker Anton Bok (1908–1988) died. However, there are many recordings of the dialect. The Leivu dialect most closely resembles the Hargla sub-dialect of Võro but was influenced by the Latvian language and possibly even Livonian.

In the year 1782, the dialect was spoken by thousands of people, in 1849 around 2600 knew the dialect and in 1935 only about 131 knew or spoke it.

In 1911, Finnish linguist Heikki Ojansuu went to document the Leivu dialect along with the Ludza and Kraasna dialects.

== Phonology ==
Due to Latvian influence, the sounds s and z have changed into š and ž. For example: suži ‘wolf’, püššü ‘gun’. There has also been a loss of the consonant /h/ in many words and it is usually replaced by a stød such as in: ra’a ‘money’, vä’ämb ‘less’.

The first syllable was pronounced longer than in other South-Estonian dialects, for example mùnà ‘egg’.

== Lexicon ==
Some words in Leivu:

- ria = rake
- püäbä = Sunday
- vaijõr = maple
- jaijõ = chilly
- na’a = skin
- pä’ä = head
- jèma = mother
- eza = father
- terä = seed, grain
- tarõ = room

== See also ==
- Livonian language
- Ludza dialect
- Gauja Estonians
