= South Estonian =

Finnic language spoken in South Estonia

- Võro-Seto
- Geographic distribution: Baltic States
- Native speakers: 130,000 in Estonia (2021)
- Linguistic classification: Uralic: Finnic; South Estonian
- Subdivisions: Võro; Seto; Mulgi; Tartu; Leivu †; Ludza †; Kraasna †

Language codes
- ISO 639-3: vro
- Glottolog: sout2679
- ELP: Võro
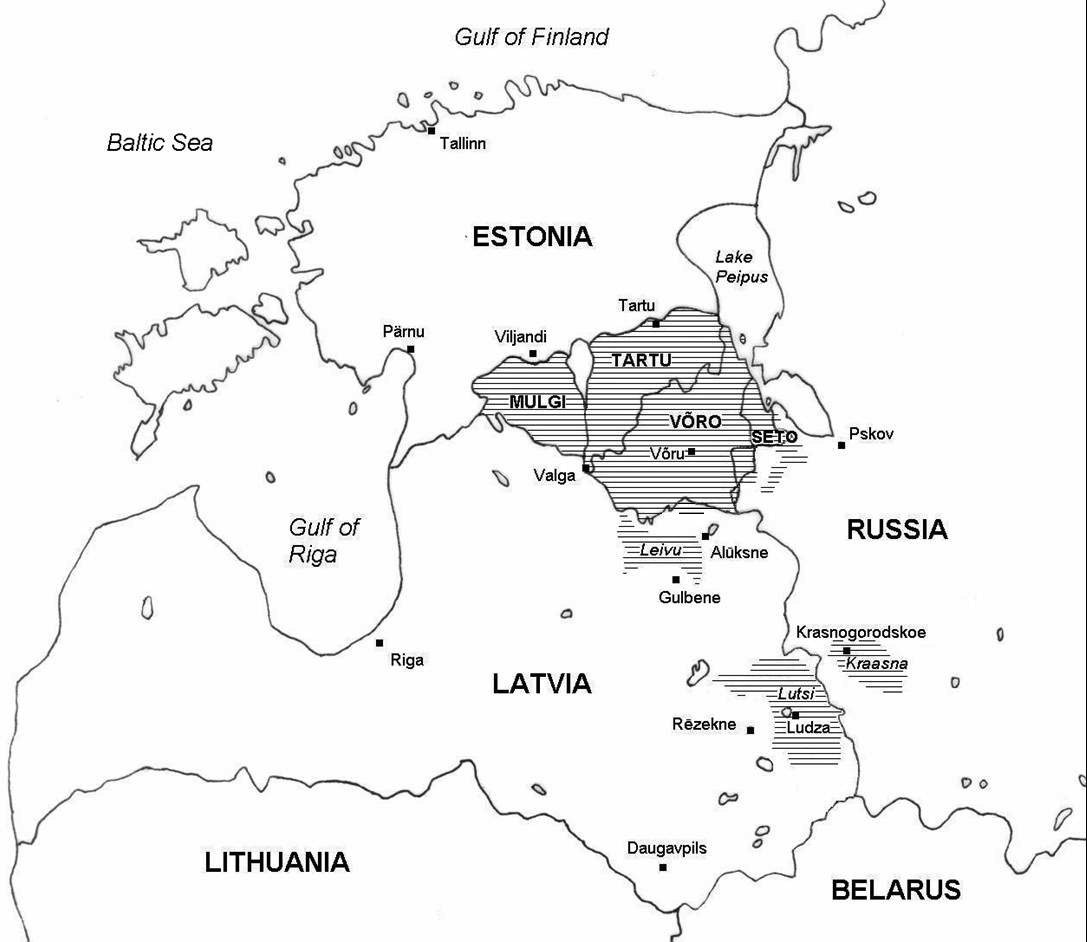
- The historical South Estonian (Võro, Seto, Mulgi and Tartu) language area with historical South Estonian language enclaves (Lutsi, Leivu and Kraasna)

- South Estonian is classified as Definitely Endangered by the UNESCO Atlas of the World's Languages in Danger (2010)

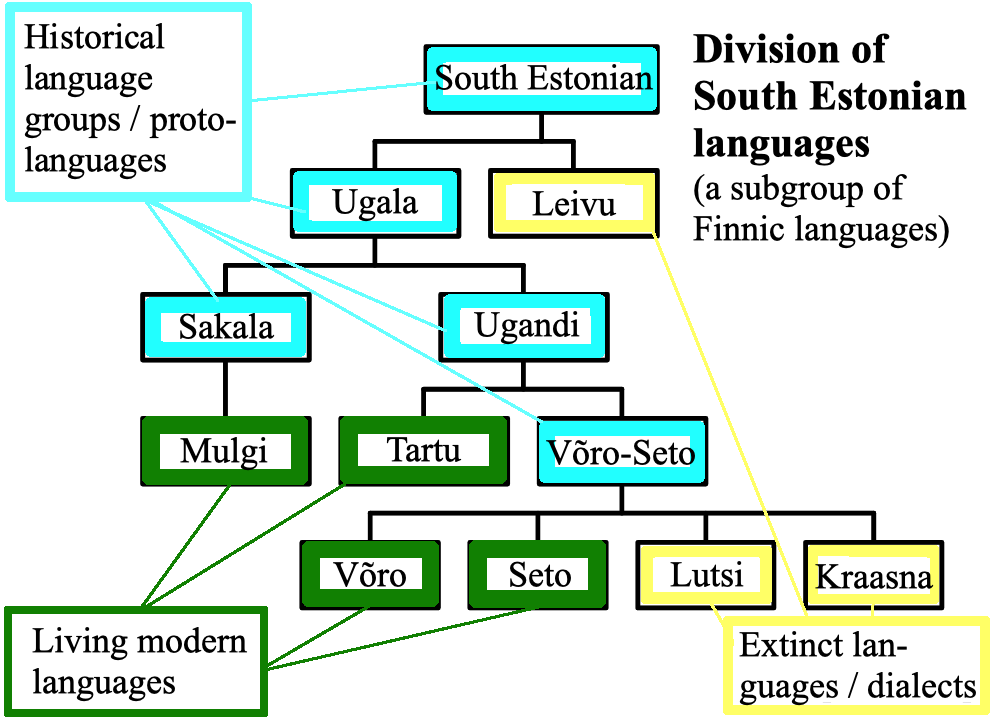
Classification of South Estonian dialects according to Petri Kallio (2021).

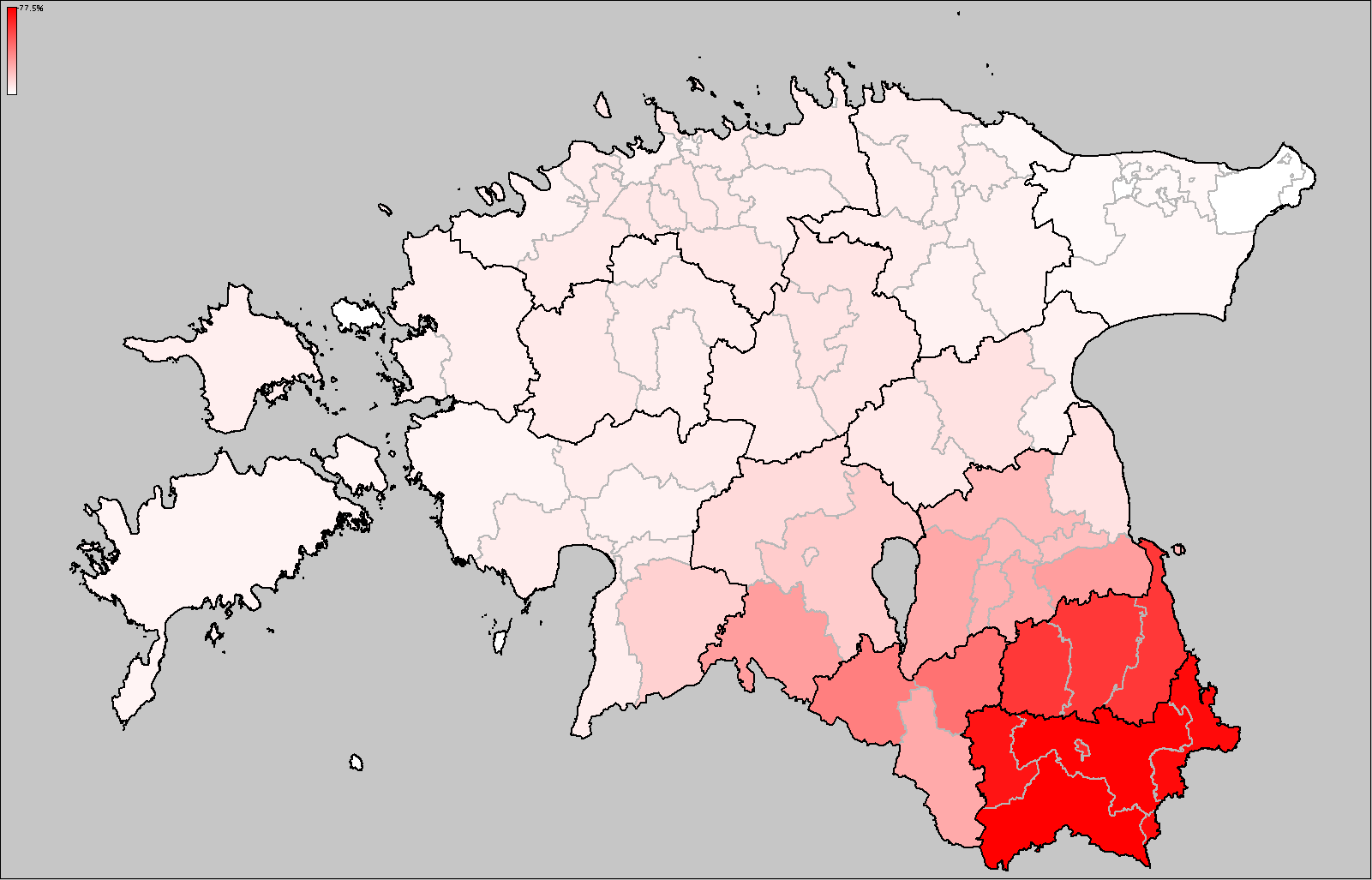
Distribution of South Estonian speakers according to the 2021 census.

South Estonian, or Võro-Seto, is a Finnic language spoken in south-eastern Estonia, encompassing the Tartu, Mulgi, Võro and Seto dialects. Diachronically speaking, Estonian and South Estonian are in separate branches of the Finnic languages, with Estonian being more closely related to Finnish than it is to South Estonian.

Modern Standard Estonian has evolved on the basis of the dialects of Northern Estonian. However, from the 17th to the 19th centuries in Southern Estonia, literature was published in a standardized form of Southern Tartu and Northern Võro. That usage was called Tartu or literary South Estonian. The written standard was used in the schools, churches and courts of the Võro and Tartu linguistic area but not in the Seto and Mulgi areas.

After Estonia gained independence in 1918, the standardized Estonian language policies were implemented further throughout the country. The government officials during the era believed that the Estonian state needed to have one standard language for all of its citizens, which led to the exclusion of South Estonian in education. The ban on the instruction and the use of South Estonian dialects in schools continued during the Soviet occupation (1940–1990).

Since Estonia regained independence in 1991, the Estonian government has become more supportive of the protection and development of South Estonian. A modernized literary form founded on the Võro dialect of South Estonian has been sanctioned.

== Varieties ==
Pulga Jaan, a native Võro speaker.

The extant varieties of the South Estonian language area are Mulgi, Tartu, Võro and Seto. Võro and Seto have remained furthest from the standard written Estonian language and are most difficult for speakers of standard Estonian to understand.

Three enclaves of South Estonian are attested. The Lievu and Lutsi dialects in Latvia became extinct in the 20th century. The Kraasna enclave in Russia, still aware of their identity, have been assimilated linguistically by Russians.

== Characteristics ==
The distinction between South Estonian and North Estonian is starker than any other contrast between Estonian dialects, and is present at every level of the language.

Phonological differences include:

Trait	South Estonian	North Estonian
Vowel harmony	present	lost
õ in unstressed syllables	present in Võro and Seto	absent (present in Kihnu)
Diphthongization of long vowels	ää, õõ retained e.g. pää 'head'	ää, õõ retained e.g. jää 'ice' occasionally diphthongized > ea, õe e.g. pea 'head'
Raising of long mid vowels	*ee, *öö, *oo raised > i̬i̬, ü̬ü̬, u̬u̬	ee, öö, oo retained (dialectally diphthongized: ie, üö, uo)
Unrounding of ü-diphthongs	no unrounding: äü retained, eü > öü e.g. täüs 'full'	rounding lost: *äü > äi, *eü > ei e.g. täis 'full'
Syncope of *i, *u	present e.g. istma 'to sit'	absent e.g. istuma 'to sit'
Word-initial ts	present e.g. tsiga 'pig'	absent e.g. siga 'pig'
Assimilations of consonant clusters	*ks > ss, *tk > kk e.g. uss 'door', sõkma 'to knead'	ks, tk retained e.g. uks 'door', sõtkuma 'to knead'
Assimilations of consonant clusters	*pc, *kc > *cc > ts e.g. ütsʼ 'one', latsʼ 'child'	*pc, *kc > ps, ks e.g. üks 'one', laps 'child'
Assimilations of consonant clusters	*kn > nn, *kt > tt e.g. nännü(q) 'seen', vatt 'foam'	*kn > in, *kt > ht e.g. näinud 'seen', vaht 'foam'
Vocalization of syllable-final *k	absent or full vocalization e.g. nagõl 'nail', naar 'laughter', vaǵa 'wedge'	*kl > *jl, *kr > *jr, *kj > *jj e.g. nael 'nail', naer 'laughter', vai 'wedge'
Treatment of voiced consonant + *h	*nh > hn, *lh > hl, *rh > hr e.g. vahn 'old', kahr 'bear'	*nh > n, *lh > l, *rh > r e.g. vana 'old', karu 'bear'
Gemination of single consonants before the adjective ending *-eda/*-edä	present e.g. kipõ 'sore', elläi 'animal'	absent e.g. kibe 'sore', elajas 'beast'

Morphological differences:

Category	South Estonian	North Estonian
Nominative plural	-q /ʔ/	-d
Oblique plural	-i- most common	-de- most common
Partitive singular	-t, -d	-t, -d
Inessive	-n, -h, -hn	-s
Illative	-he, -de/-dõ	-sse
Comparative	-mb, -mp, -p	-m
da-infinitive	elided in trisyllabic forms e.g. istuq 'to sit'	present in trisyllabic forms e.g. istuda 'to sit'
Imperfect	-i- most common	-si- most common
Past active participle	-nuq/-nüq, -nu, -n	-nud, -nd
Past passive participle	-tu/-tü, -du/-dü, -t, -d	-tud, -dud
3rd person singular	endingless (or -s)	-b
Negative imperfect	es + connegative	ei + past participle

== History ==
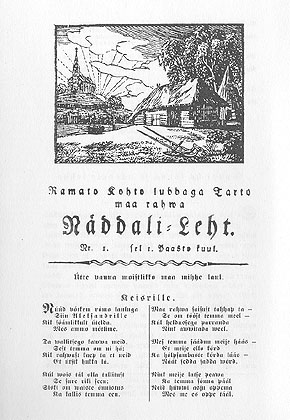
Tarto maa rahwa Näddali Leht published in 1807 in Tartu literary South Estonian.

The two different historical Estonian languages, North and South Estonian, are based on the ancestors of modern Estonians' migration into the territory of Estonia in at least two different waves, both groups speaking differing Finnic vernaculars. Some of the most ancient isoglosses within the Finnic languages separate South Estonian from the entire rest of the family, including a development *čk → tsk, seen in for example *kačku → Standard Estonian katk "plague", Finnish katku "stink", but South Estonian katsk; and a development *kc → tś, seen in for example *ükci "one" → Standard Estonian üks, Finnish yksi, but South Estonian ütś.

The first South Estonian grammar was written by Johann Gutslaff in 1648 and a translation of the New Testament (Wastne Testament) was published in 1686. In 1806 the first Estonian newspaper Tarto-ma rahwa Näddali leht was published in Tartu literary South Estonian.

Comparison of old literary South Estonian (Tartu), modern literary South Estonian (Võro) and modern standard Estonian:

Lord's Prayer (Meie Esä) in old literary South Estonian (Tartu):

Meie Esä Taiwan: pühendetüs saagu sino nimi. Sino riik tulgu. Sino tahtmine sündigu kui Taiwan, niida ka maa pääl. Meie päiwälikku leibä anna meile täämbä. Nink anna meile andis meie süü, niida kui ka meie andis anname omile süidläisile. Nink ärä saada meid mitte kiusatuse sisse; enge pästä meid ärä kurjast: Sest sino perält om riik, nink wägi, nink awwustus igäwätses ajas. Aamen.

Lord's Prayer (Mi Esä) in modern literary South Estonian (Võro):

Mi Esä taivan: pühendedüs saaguq sino nimi. Sino riik tulguq. Sino tahtminõ sündkuq, ku taivan, nii ka maa pääl. Mi päävälikku leibä annaq meile täämbä. Nink annaq meile andis mi süüq, nii ku ka mi andis anna umilõ süüdläisile. Ni saatku-i meid joht kiusatusõ sisse, a pästäq meid ärq kur’ast, selle et sino perält om riik ja vägi ni avvustus igävädses aos. Aamõn.

Lord's Prayer (Meie isa) in modern standard Estonian:

Meie isa, kes Sa oled taevas: pühitsetud olgu Sinu nimi. Sinu riik tulgu. Sinu tahtmine sündigu, nagu taevas, nõnda ka maa peal. Meie igapäevast leiba anna meile tänapäev. Ja anna meile andeks meie võlad, nagu meiegi andeks anname oma võlglastele. Ja ära saada meid kiusatusse, vaid päästa meid ära kurjast. Sest Sinu päralt on riik ja vägi ja au igavesti. Aamen.

The South Estonian literary language declined after the 1880s as the northern literary language became the standard for Estonian. Under the influence of the European liberal-oriented nationalist movement it was felt that there should be a unified Estonian language. The beginning of the 20th century saw a period for the rapid development of the northern-based variety.

== Present situation ==
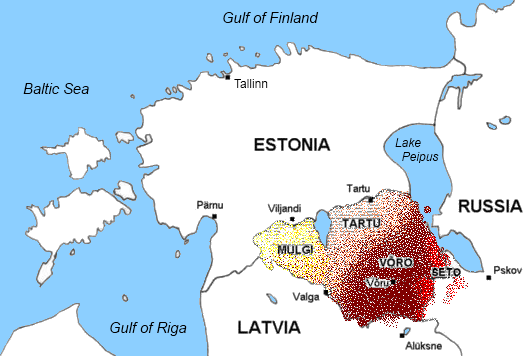
South Estonian today

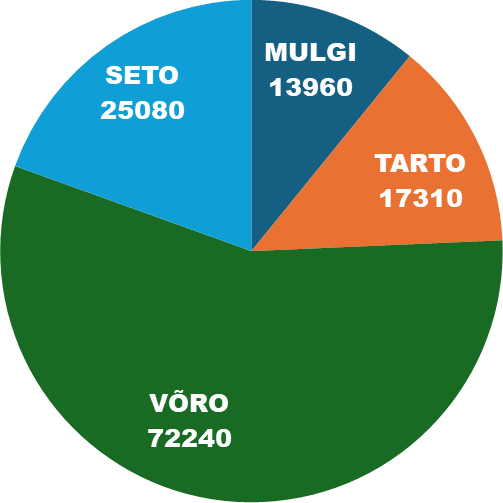
According to the 2021 Estonia census there were 128,590 speakers of South Estonian: 97,320 speakers of Võro (72,240 when excluding 25,080 Seto speakers), 17,310 Tartu language speakers and 13,960 Mulgi speakers.

South Estonian began to undergo a revival in the late 1980s. Today, South Estonian is used in the works of some of Estonia's most well-known playwrights, poets, and authors. Most success has been achieved in promoting a new literary standard based on Võro. Mulgi and especially Tartu, however, have very few speakers left. The 2011 census in Estonia counted 101,857 self-reported speakers of South Estonian: 87,048 speakers of Võro (74,499 when excluding 12,549 Seto speakers), 9,698 Mulgi speakers, 4,109 Tartu language speakers and 1,002 who did not specify a variety.

The 2021 census in Estonia counted 128,590 self-reported speakers of South Estonian among native speakers: 97,320 speakers of Võro (72,240 when excluding 25,080 Seto speakers), 17,310 Tartu language speakers and 13,960 Mulgi speakers.

Language sample of modern literary (Võro) South Estonian:

Article 1 of the Universal Declaration of Human Rights:

Kõik inemiseq sünnüseq vapos ja ütesugumaidsis uma avvo ja õiguisi poolõst. Näile om annõt mudsu ja süämetunnistus ja nä piät ütstõõsõga vele muudu läbi käümä.

All human beings are born free and equal in dignity and rights. They are endowed with reason and conscience and should act towards one another in a spirit of brotherhood.

== See also ==
- Võro language
- Seto dialect
- Finnic languages
- Centre for South Estonian Language and Cultural Studies
- Võro Institute

== Bibliography ==
- Eller, Kalle (1999): Võro-Seto language. Võro Instituut'. Võro.
- Iva, Sulev; Pajusalu, Karl (2004): The Võro Language: Historical Development and Present Situation. In: Language Policy and Sociolinguistics I: "Regional Languages in the New Europe" International Scientific Conference; Rēzeknes Augstskola, Latvija; 20–23 May 2004. Rezekne: Rezekne Augstskolas Izdevnieceba, 2004, 58 – 63.
- Kask, Arnold (1984): Eesti murded ja kirjakeel. Emäkeele seltsi toimetised 16.
