= Mulgi dialect =

Uralic language

Mulgi
- mulgi kiilʼ
- Native to: Estonia
- Region: Mulgimaa
- Ethnicity: Mulgis
- Native speakers: 13,960 (2021)
- Language family: Uralic: Finno-Ugric; Finnic; South Estonian; Mulgi
- Writing system: Latin

Language codes
- ISO 639-3: –
- Glottolog: mulg1249
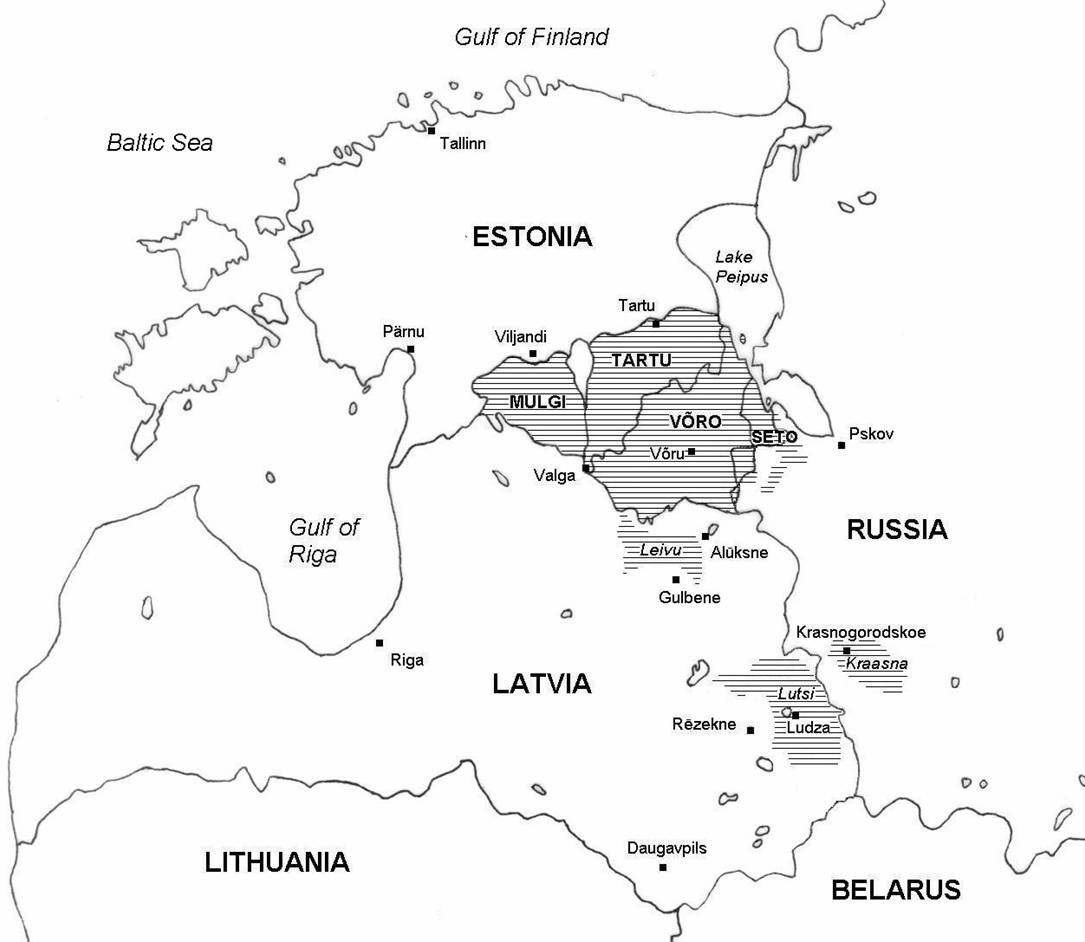
- Map of South Estonian languages, with Mulgi.

Mulgi (Estonian: mulgi keel, South Estonian (including Mulgi): mulgi kiilʼ) is a dialect of South Estonian spoken in Mulgimaa, a cultural-historical region in Southern Estonia. The 2021 Estonian census counted 13,960 speakers.

== Usage ==
Mulgi is spoken only by the older generation, as children are taught in standard Estonian, and parents do not pass Mulgi down to their children.

The Mulgi Cultural Institute (Mulgi Kultuuri Instituut) operated from 1934 to 1940, and also since 1989. It produces, publishes and distributes productions in Mulgi (tales, nursery rhymes, and songs).

A Mulgi newspaper is printed irregularly.

Two notable Mulgi writers are August Kitzberg (1855-1927) and Nikolai Baturin (1936-2019).
