= Estonian language =

Uralic language

Estonian
- eesti keel
- Pronunciation: [ˈeːsʲti ˈkeːl]
- Native to: Estonia
- Region: Northern Europe
- Ethnicity: Estonians
- Native speakers: 1.2 million (2022)
- Language family: Uralic: Finnic; Southern Finnic; Estonian
- Dialects: North (Standard) Estonian; Northeastern coastal Estonian; South Estonian
- Writing system: Latin (Estonian alphabet); Estonian Braille

Official status
- Official language in: Estonia; European Union
- Regulated by: Institute of the Estonian Language / Eesti Keele Instituut

Language codes
- ISO 639-1: et
- ISO 639-2: est
- ISO 639-3: est – inclusive code Individual code: ekk – (Northern/Standard) Estonian
- Glottolog: esto1258
- Linguasphere: 41-AAA-d
- Estonian is official in Estonia (dark green) and in the European Union (light green)

Estonian (eesti keel [ˈeːsʲti ˈkeːl]) is a Finnic language of the Uralic language family, and the official and national language of Estonia. Estonian is written using the Latin alphabet and is the first language of the majority of the country's population; it is also an official language of the European Union. Estonian is spoken natively by about 1.1 million people: 922,000 people in Estonia and 160,000 elsewhere.

== Classification ==
Estonian belongs to the Finnic (a.k.a. Baltic Finnic) branch of the Uralic (a.k.a. Uralian, or Finno-Ugric) language family. Other Finnic languages include Finnish and several endangered languages spoken around the Baltic Sea and in northwestern Russia. Estonian is typically subclassified as a Southern Finnic language, and it is the second-most-spoken language among all the Finnic languages.

Alongside Finnish, Hungarian and Maltese, Estonian is one of the only four (out of 24) official languages of the European Union that are not Indo-European languages.

In terms of linguistic morphology, Estonian has both agglutinative and fusional features. Inflectional morphology is more agglutinative with verbs. The transitional form from an agglutinating to a fusional language is a common feature of Estonian typologically over the course of history with the development of a rich morphological system.

Word order is considerably more flexible than in English, but the basic order especially of the spoken language is subject–verb–object.

== History ==
The speakers of the two major historical languages spoken in Estonia, North and South Estonian, are thought by some linguists to have arrived in Estonia in at least two different migration waves over two millennia ago, both groups having spoken considerably different vernacular. Some linguists have classified South Estonian as another, separate Finnic language, rather than a variety of Estonian. Modern standard Estonian evolved in the 18th and 19th centuries based on the dialects of northern Estonia.

During the Medieval and Early Modern periods, Estonian accepted many loanwords from Germanic languages, mainly from Middle Low German (Middle Saxon) and, after the 16th-century Protestant Reformation, from the Standard German language.

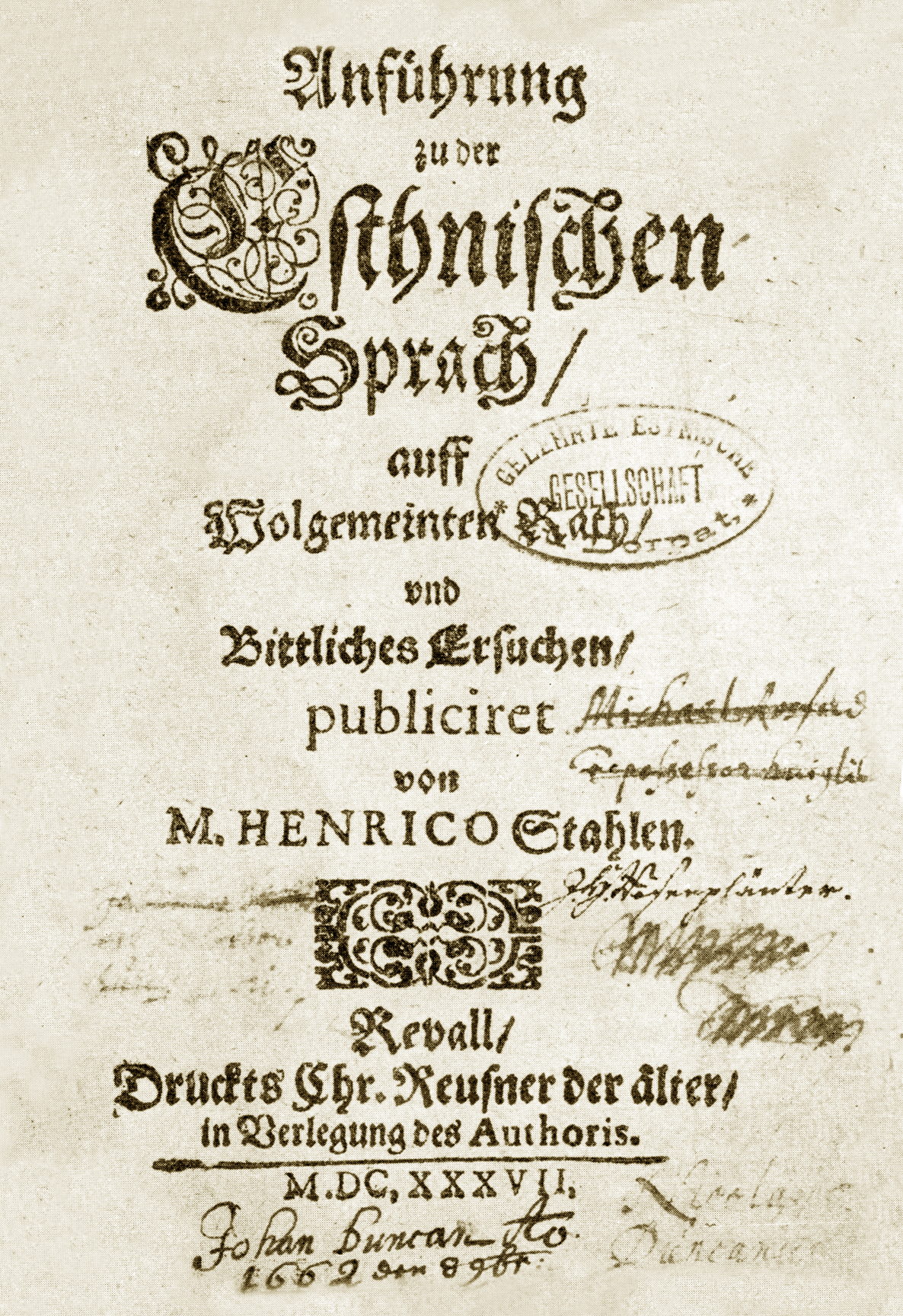
Estonian Grammar by Heinrich Stahl, published in Tallinn (Reval) in 1637

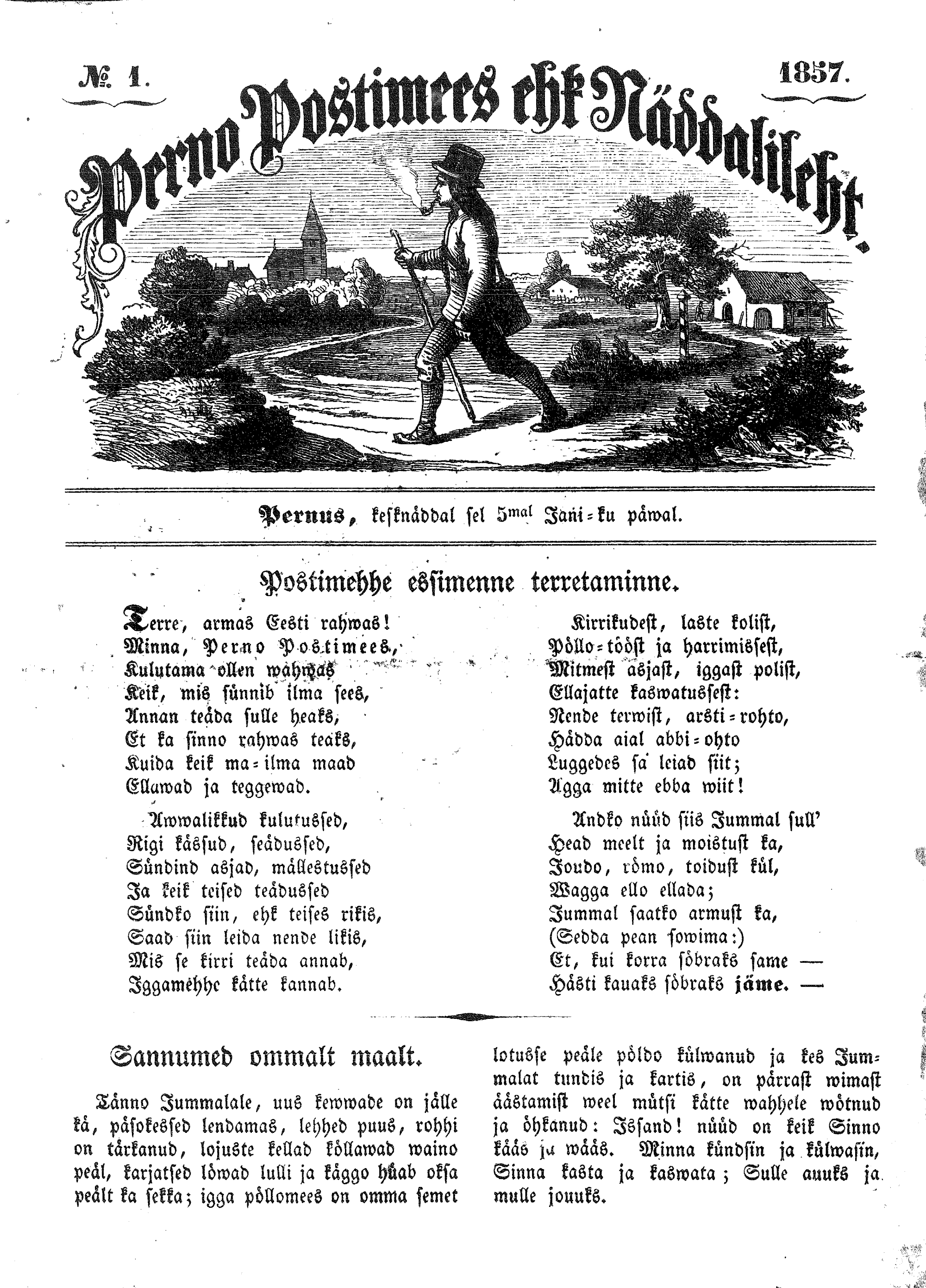
In 1857, editor Johann Voldemar Jannsen of the first Estonian-language weekly newspaper Perno Postimees welcomed readers with "Terre, armas Eesti rahwas!" ("Hello, dear Estonian people!")

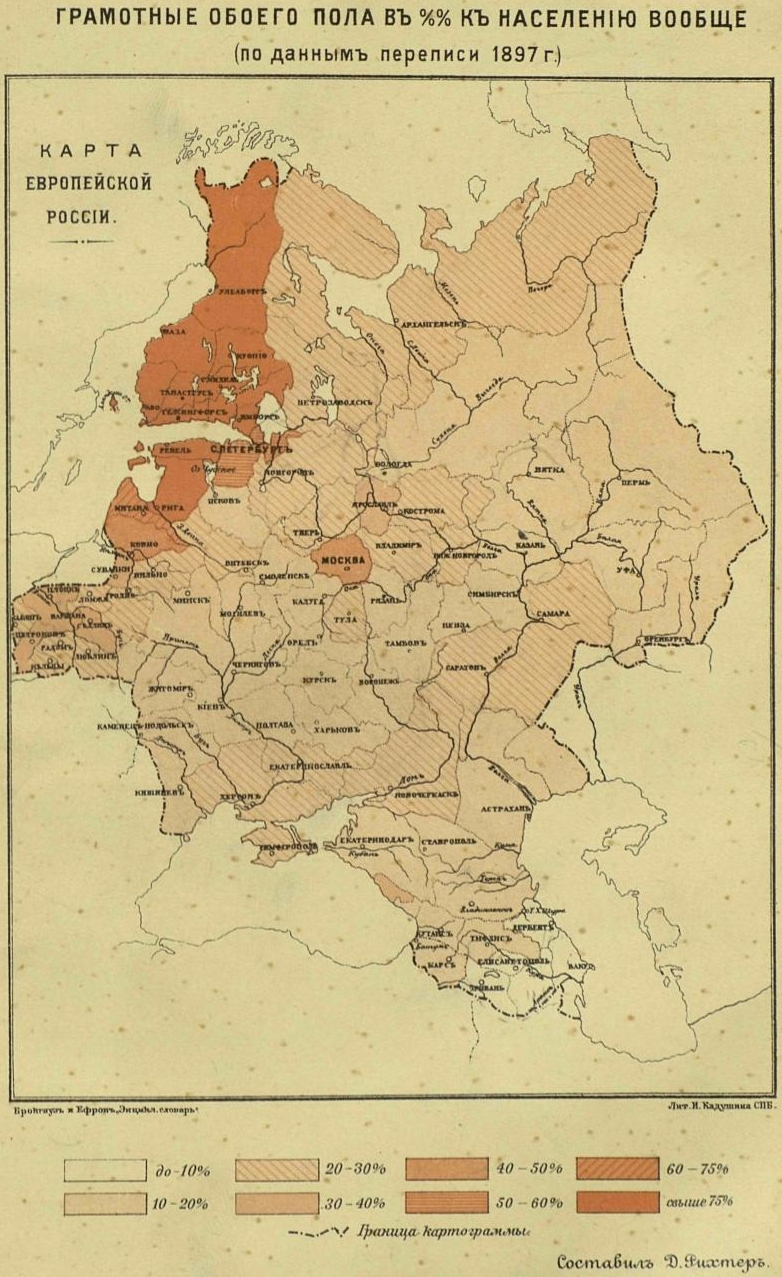
According to the 1897 census 96.1% of the native Estonian-speaking population (age 10 and older, roughly equally for males and females) was literate.

Geographic distribution of Estonian in the Russian Empire according to the 1897 census

The oldest written records of the Estonian language date from the 13th century. The "Originates Livoniae" in the Livonian Chronicle of Henry contains Estonian place names, words and fragments of sentences.

=== Estonian literature ===
The earliest extant samples of connected (north) Estonian have been found in the Kullamaa Manuscript ("Kullamaa prayers") dating from 1524 and 1528. In 1525, the first Estonian language book was printed. It contained a religious Lutheran text which, however, never reached its intended readers, as it was immediately censored and all printed copies were destroyed.

The first extant Estonian book is a bilingual German-Estonian translation of the Lutheran catechism by S. Wanradt and J. Koell dating to 1535, during the Protestant Reformation period. An Estonian grammar book to be used by priests was printed in German in 1637. The New Testament was translated into the variety of South Estonian called Võro in 1686 (northern Estonian, 1715). The two languages were united based on Northern Estonian by Anton thor Helle.

Writings in Estonian became more significant in the 19th century during the Estophile Enlightenment Period (1750–1840).

The birth of native Estonian literature was during the period 1810–1820, when the patriotic and philosophical poems by Kristjan Jaak Peterson were published. Peterson, who was the first student to acknowledge his Estonian origin at the then German-language University of Dorpat, is commonly regarded as a herald of Estonian national literature and considered the founder of modern Estonian poetry. His birthday, March 14, is celebrated in Estonia as Mother Tongue Day. A fragment from Peterson's poem "Kuu" expresses the claim reestablishing the birthright of the Estonian language:

Kas siis selle maa keel
Laulutuules ei või
Taevani tõustes üles
Igavikku omale otsida?

In English:

Can the language of this land
In the wind of incantation
Rising up to the heavens
Not seek for eternity?

Kristjan Jaak Peterson

In the period from 1525 to 1917, 14,503 titles were published in Estonian; by comparison, between 1918 and 1940, 23,868 titles were published.

In modern times A. H. Tammsaare, Jaan Kross, and Andrus Kivirähk are Estonia's best-known and most translated writers.

Estonians lead the world in book ownership, owning on average 218 books per house, and 35% of Estonians owning 350 books or more (as of 2018).

=== Official language ===
Writings in Estonian became significant only in the 19th century with the spread of the ideas of the Age of Enlightenment, during the Estophile Enlightenment Period (1750–1840). Although Baltic Germans at large regarded the future of Estonians as being a fusion with themselves, the Estophile educated class admired the ancient culture of the Estonians and their era of freedom before the conquests by Danes and Germans in the 13th century.

When the Republic of Estonia was established in 1918, Estonian became the official language of the newly independent country. Immediately after World War II, in 1945, over 97% of the then population of Estonia self-identified as native ethnic Estonians and spoke the language.

When Estonia was invaded and reoccupied by the Soviet army in 1944, the status of Estonian effectively changed to one of the two official languages (Russian being the other one). Many immigrants from Russia entered Estonia under Soviet encouragement. In the 1970s, the pressure of bilingualism for Estonians was intensified. Although teaching Estonian to non-Estonians in local schools was formally compulsory, in practice, the teaching and learning of Estonian by Russian-speakers was often considered unnecessary by the Soviet authorities. In 1991, with the restoration of Estonia's independence, Estonian went back to being the only official language in Estonia. When Estonia joined the EU in 2004, Estonian became one of its now 24 official languages.

The return of former Soviet immigrants to their countries of origin at the end of the 20th century has brought the proportion of native Estonian-speakers in Estonia now back above 70%. Large parts of the first- and second-generation immigrants in Estonia have now adopted Estonian (over 50% as of the 2022 census).

== Dialects ==
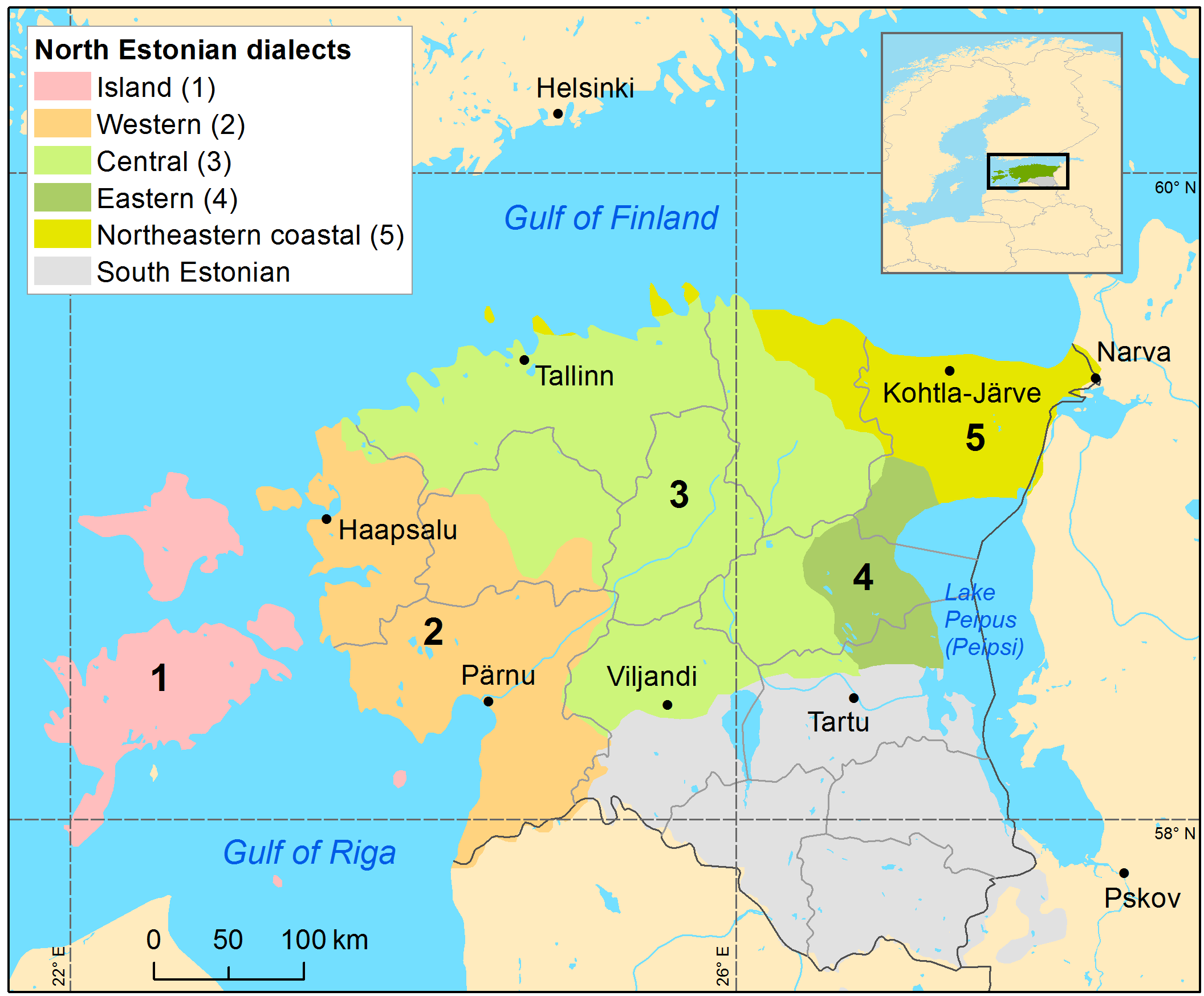
North Estonian dialects at the beginning of the 20th century

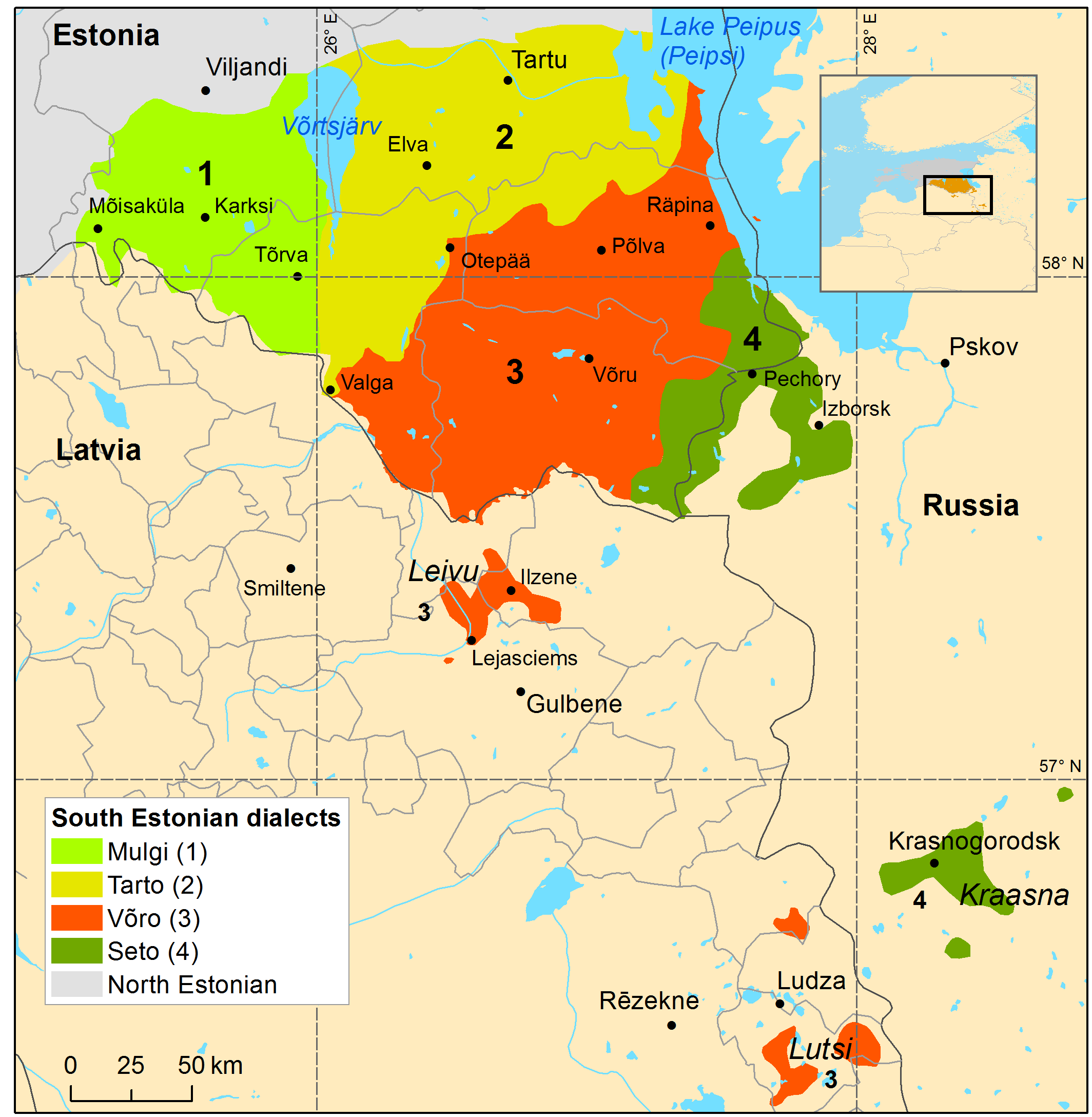
South Estonian dialects at the beginning of the 20th century

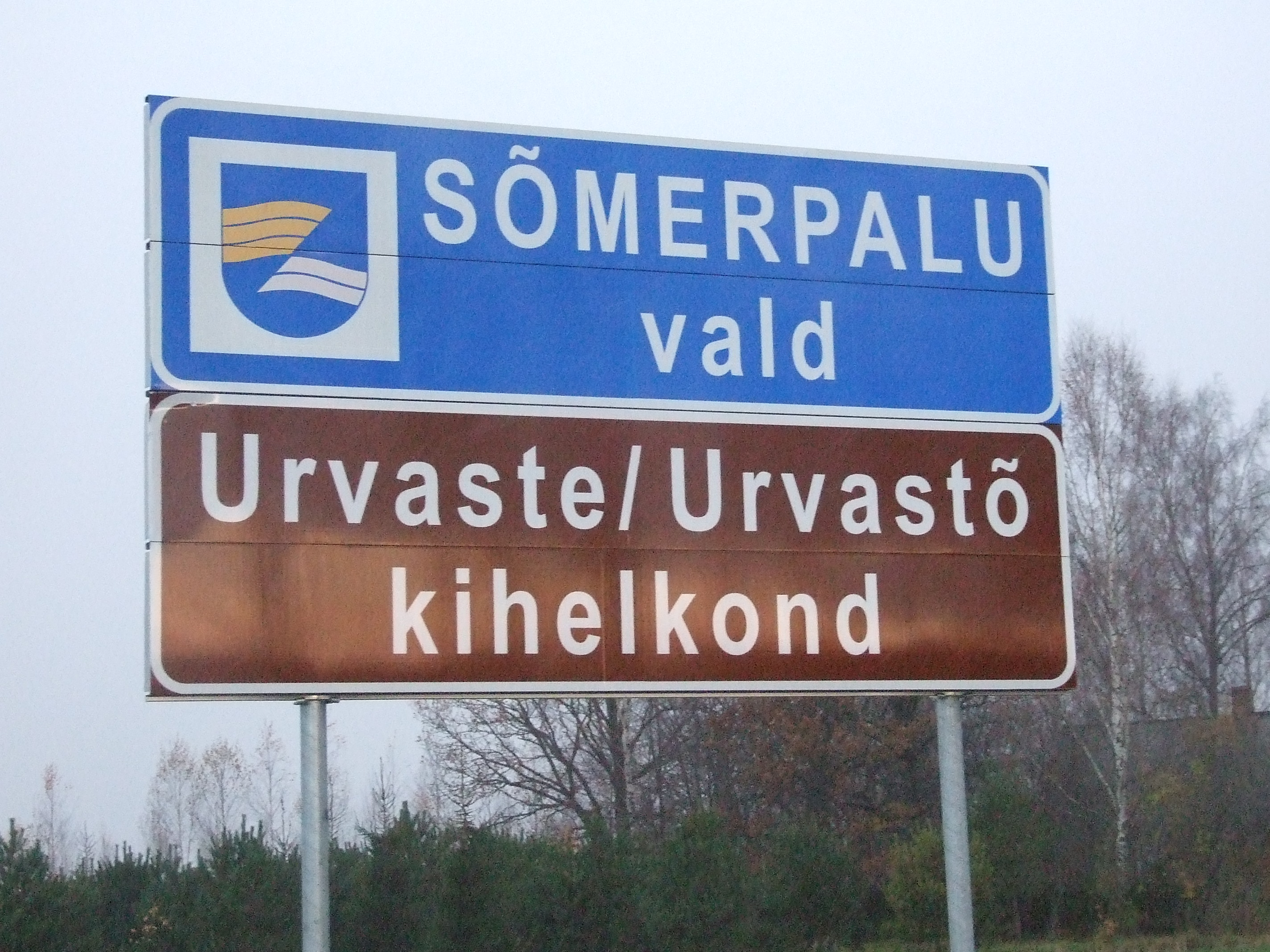
Road sign in Estonian and Võro

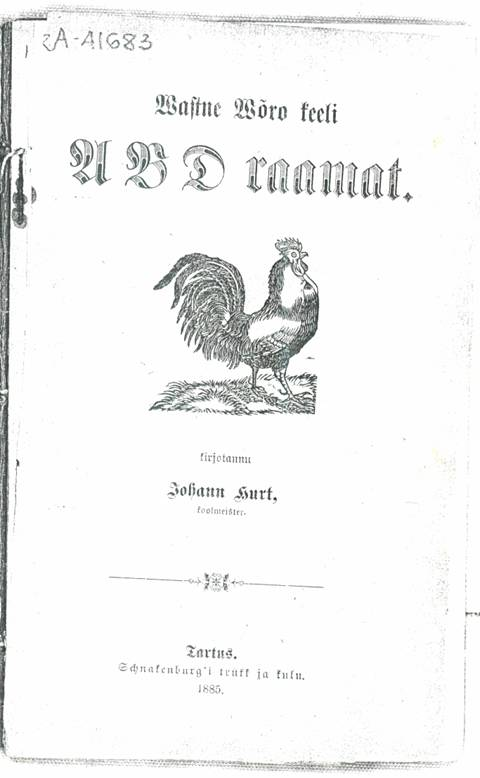
An 1885 ABC-book in Võro written by Johann Hurt: "Wastne Võro keeli ABD raamat"

The Estonian dialects are divided into two groups – the northern and southern dialects, historically associated with the cities of Tallinn in the north and Tartu in the south, in addition to a distinct kirderanniku dialect, Northeastern coastal Estonian.

The northern group consists of the keskmurre or central dialect that is also the basis for the standard language, the läänemurre or western dialect, roughly corresponding to Lääne County and Pärnu County, the saarte murre (islands' dialect) of Saaremaa, Hiiumaa, Muhu and Kihnu, and the idamurre or eastern dialect on the northwestern shore of Lake Peipus.

One of the pronunciation features of the Saaremaa dialect is the lack of the 'õ' vowel. A five-metre monument erected in 2020, marking the "border" between the vowels 'õ' and 'ö', humorously makes reference to this fact.

South Estonian consists of the Tartu, Mulgi, Võro and Seto varieties. These are sometimes considered either variants of South Estonian or separate languages altogether. Also, Seto and Võro distinguish themselves from each other less by language and more by their culture and their respective Christian confession.

== Writing system ==
=== Alphabet ===
Estonian employs the Latin script as the basis for its alphabet. The script adds the letters ä, ö, ü, and õ, plus the later additions š and ž. The letters c, q, w, x and y are limited to proper names of foreign origin, and f, z, š, and ž appear in loanwords and foreign names only. Ö and Ü are pronounced similarly to their equivalents in Swedish and German. Unlike in standard German but like Swedish (when followed by 'r') and Finnish, Ä is pronounced [æ], as in English mat. The letter õ denotes /ɤ/, the close-mid back unrounded vowel; it is almost identical to the Bulgarian ъ /ɤ̞/ and the Vietnamese ơ, and is also used to transcribe the Russian ы. Additionally C, Q, W, X, and Y are used in writing foreign proper names. They do not occur in native Estonian words, and are only used in loanwords. Including all the foreign letters, the alphabet consists of the following 32 letters:

Letter		IPA	Name	Notes	Letter		IPA	Name	Notes
A	a	[ɑ]	aa [ɑːː]		Q	q	—	kuu [kuːː]	(Note: Not officially part of the alphabet; only used in foreign proper names and citations, pronounced according to their source language. Occasionally, w is used instead of v in Estonian surnames (e. g. Wõrk), as a remnant of older spelling.)
B	b	[b]	bee [beːː]		R	r	[r]	err [erːː] or ärr [ærːː]	
C	c	—	tsee [tseːː]		S	s	[s]	ess [esːː]	
D	d	[d]	dee [deːː]		Š	š	[ʃ] or [ʃː]	šaa [ʃɑːː]	(Note: Only used in loanwords.)
E	e	[e]	ee [eːː]		Z	z	[s]	zett [setːː]	
F	f	[f] or [fː]	eff [efːː]		Ž	ž	[ʃ]	žee [ʃeːː]	
G	g	[ɡ]	gee [ɡeːː]		T	t	[t] or [tː]	tee [teːː]	
H	h	[h]	haa [hɑːː]		U	u	[u]	uu [uːː]	
I	i	[i]	ii [iːː]		V	v	[v]	vee [veːː]	
J	j	[j]	jott [jotʲːː]		W	w	—	kaksisvee [kɑk.sisˈveːː]	
K	k	[k] or [kː]	kaa [kɑːː]		Õ	õ	[ɤ]	õõ [ɤːː]	
L	l	[l]	ell [elːː]		Ä	ä	[æ]	ää [æːː]	
M	m	[m]	emm [emːː]		Ö	ö	[ø]	öö [øːː]	
N	n	[n]	enn [enːː]		Ü	ü	[y]	üü [yːː]	
O	o	[o]	oo [oːː]		X	x	—	iks [iksː]	
P	p	[p] or [pː]	pee [peːː]		Y	y	—	igrek [ˈiɡ.rek] or üpsilon [ˈyp.si.lon]	

=== Orthography ===
Although Estonian orthography is generally guided by phonemic principles, with each grapheme corresponding to one phoneme, there are some historical and morphological deviations from this: for example preservation of the morpheme in declension of the word (writing b, g, d in places where p, k, t is pronounced) and in the use of 'i' and 'j'. Where it is very impractical or impossible to type š and ž, they are replaced by sh and zh in some written texts, although this is considered incorrect. Otherwise, the h in sh represents a voiceless glottal fricative, as in Pasha (pas-ha); this also applies to some foreign names.

Modern Estonian orthography is based on the "Newer Orthography" created by Eduard Ahrens in the second half of the 19th century, which was based on Finnish orthography. The "Older Orthography" it replaced was created in the 17th century by Bengt Gottfried Forselius and Johann Hornung, and based on standard German orthography. Earlier writing in Estonian had, by and large, used an ad hoc orthography based on Latin and Middle Low German orthography. Some influences of the standard German orthography – for example, writing 'W'/'w' instead of 'V'/'v' – persisted well into the 1930s.

== Phonology ==
A video of a woman speaking Estonian

=== Vowels ===
There are 9 vowels and 36 diphthongs, 28 of which are native to the Estonian language.^{[1]} All nine vowels can appear as the first component of a diphthong, but only /ɑ e i o u/ occur as the second component. A vowel characteristic of Estonian is the unrounded back vowel /ɤ/, which may be close-mid back, close back, or close-mid central.

Monophthongs
	Front		Back	
	unr.	rnd.	unr.	rnd.
Close	i	y	ɯ ~ ɤ	u
Mid	e	ø	ɯ ~ ɤ	o
Open	æ		ɑ	

=== Consonants ===
Estonian consonant phonemes
		Labial	Alveolar		Post- alveolar	Dorsal	Glottal
		Labial	plain	palatal.	Post- alveolar	Dorsal	Glottal
Nasal		m	n	nʲ		(ŋ)	
Plosive	short	p	t	tʲ		k	
Plosive	long	pː	tː	tʲː		kː	
Fricative
Fricative	short	f	s	sʲ	ʃ		h
Fricative	long	fː	sː	sʲː	ʃː		hː
Approximant		ʋ	l	lʲ		j	
Trill			r				

Word-initial b, d, g occur only in loanwords and some old loanwords are spelled with p, t, k instead of etymological b, d, g: pank 'bank'. Word-medially and word-finally, b, d, g represent short plosives /p, t, k/ (may be pronounced as partially voiced consonants), p, t, k represent half-long plosives /pː, tː, kː/, and pp, tt, kk represent overlong plosives /pːː, tːː, kːː/; for example: kabi /kɑpi/ 'hoof' — kapi /kɑpːi/ 'wardrobe [gen sg] — kappi /kɑpːːi/ 'wardrobe [ptv sg]'.

Before and after b, p, d, t, g, k, s, h, f, š, z, ž, the sounds [p], [t], [k] are written as p, t, k, with some exceptions due to morphology or etymology.

Representation of palatalised consonants is inconsistent, and they are not always indicated.

[ŋ] is an allophone of /n/ before /k/.

While peripheral Estonian dialects are characterized by various degrees of vowel harmony, central dialects have almost completely lost the feature. Since the standard language is based on central dialects, it has no vowel harmony either. In the standard language, the front vowels occur exclusively on the first or stressed syllable, although vowel harmony is still apparent in older texts.

== Grammar ==
Typologically, Estonian represents a transitional form from an agglutinating language to a fusional language. The canonical word order is SVO (subject–verb–object), although often debated among linguists. The basic structure remains affected by traditional subject-object-verb and a principal V2 word order (verb-second as to the finite verb).

In Estonian, nouns and pronouns do not have grammatical gender, but nouns and adjectives decline in fourteen cases: nominative, genitive, partitive, illative, inessive, elative, allative, adessive, ablative, translative, terminative, essive, abessive, and comitative, with the case and number of the adjective always agreeing with that of the noun (except in the terminative, essive, abessive and comitative, where there is agreement only for the number, the adjective being in the genitive form). Thus the illative for kollane maja ("a yellow house") is kollasesse majja ("into a yellow house"), but the terminative is kollase majani ("as far as a yellow house"). With respect to the Proto-Finnic language, elision has occurred; thus, the actual case marker may be absent, but the stem is changed, cf. maja – majja and the Ostrobothnia dialect of Finnish maja – majahan.

The verbal system has no distinct future tense (the present tense serves here) and features special forms to express an action performed by an undetermined subject (the "impersonal").

== Vocabulary ==
Although Estonian and the Germanic languages have very different origins and the vocabulary is considered quite different from that of the Indo-European family, one can identify many similar words in Estonian and English, for example. This is primarily because Estonian has borrowed nearly one-third of its vocabulary from Germanic languages, mainly from Low Saxon (Middle Low German) during the period of German rule, and High German (including standard German). The percentage of Low Saxon and High German loanwords can be estimated at 22–25 percent, with Low Saxon making up about 15 percent. Prior to the wave of new loanwords from English in the 20th and 21st centuries, historically, Swedish and Russian were also sources of borrowings but to a much lesser extent. In borrowings, often 'b' and 'p' are interchangeable, for example 'baggage' becomes 'pagas', 'lob' (to throw) becomes 'loopima'. The initial letter 's' before another consonant is often dropped, for example 'skool' (school) becomes 'kool', 'stool' (chair) becomes 'tool'.

=== Ex nihilo lexical enrichment ===
Estonian language planners such as Ado Grenzstein (a journalist active in Estonia from the 1870s to the 1890s) tried to use formation ex nihilo (Urschöpfung); i.e. they created new words out of nothing.

The most well-known reformer of Estonian, Johannes Aavik (1880–1973), used creations ex nihilo (cf. 'free constructions', Tauli 1977), along with other sources of lexical enrichment such as derivations, compositions and loanwords (often from Finnish; cf. Saareste and Raun 1965: 76). Aavik's dictionary (1921) lists approximately 4000 words. About 40 of the 200 words created by Johannes Aavik allegedly ex nihilo are in common use today. Examples are ese 'object', kolp 'skull', liibuma 'to cling', naasma 'to return, come back', nõme 'stupid, dull'.

Many of the coinages that have been considered (often by Aavik himself) as words concocted ex nihilo could well have been influenced by foreign lexical items; for example, words from Russian, German, French, Finnish, English and Swedish. Aavik had a broad classical education and knew Ancient Greek, Latin and French. Consider roim 'crime' versus English and French crime or taunima 'to condemn, disapprove' versus Finnish tuomita 'to condemn, to judge' (these Aavikisms appear in Aavik's 1921 dictionary). These words might be better regarded as a peculiar manifestation of morpho-phonemic adaptation of a foreign lexical item.

== Example text ==
Article 1 of the Universal Declaration of Human Rights in Estonian and English:

Kõik inimesed sünnivad vabadena ja võrdsetena oma väärikuselt ja õigustelt. Neile on antud mõistus ja südametunnistus ja nende suhtumist üksteisesse peab kandma vendluse vaim.

All human beings are born free and equal in dignity and rights. They are endowed with reason and conscience and should act towards one another in a spirit of brotherhood.

== See also ==
- The BABEL Speech Corpus
