= Seto dialect =

Dialect of South Estonian

Seto
- seto kiil´
- Native to: Estonia
- Region: Setomaa
- Ethnicity: Setos
- Native speakers: 25,080 (2021 census)
- Language family: Uralic: Finnic; South Estonian; Võro-Seto; Seto
- Writing system: Latin

Language codes
- ISO 639-3: –
- Glottolog: seto1244
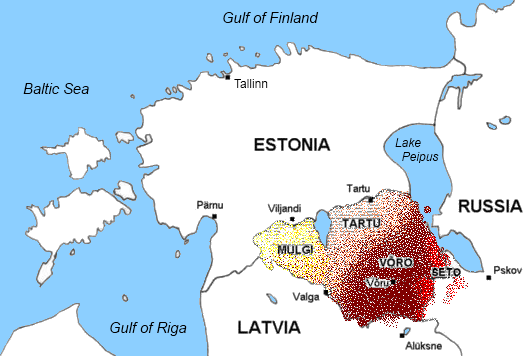
- South Estonian today. Seto is marked with light red colour.

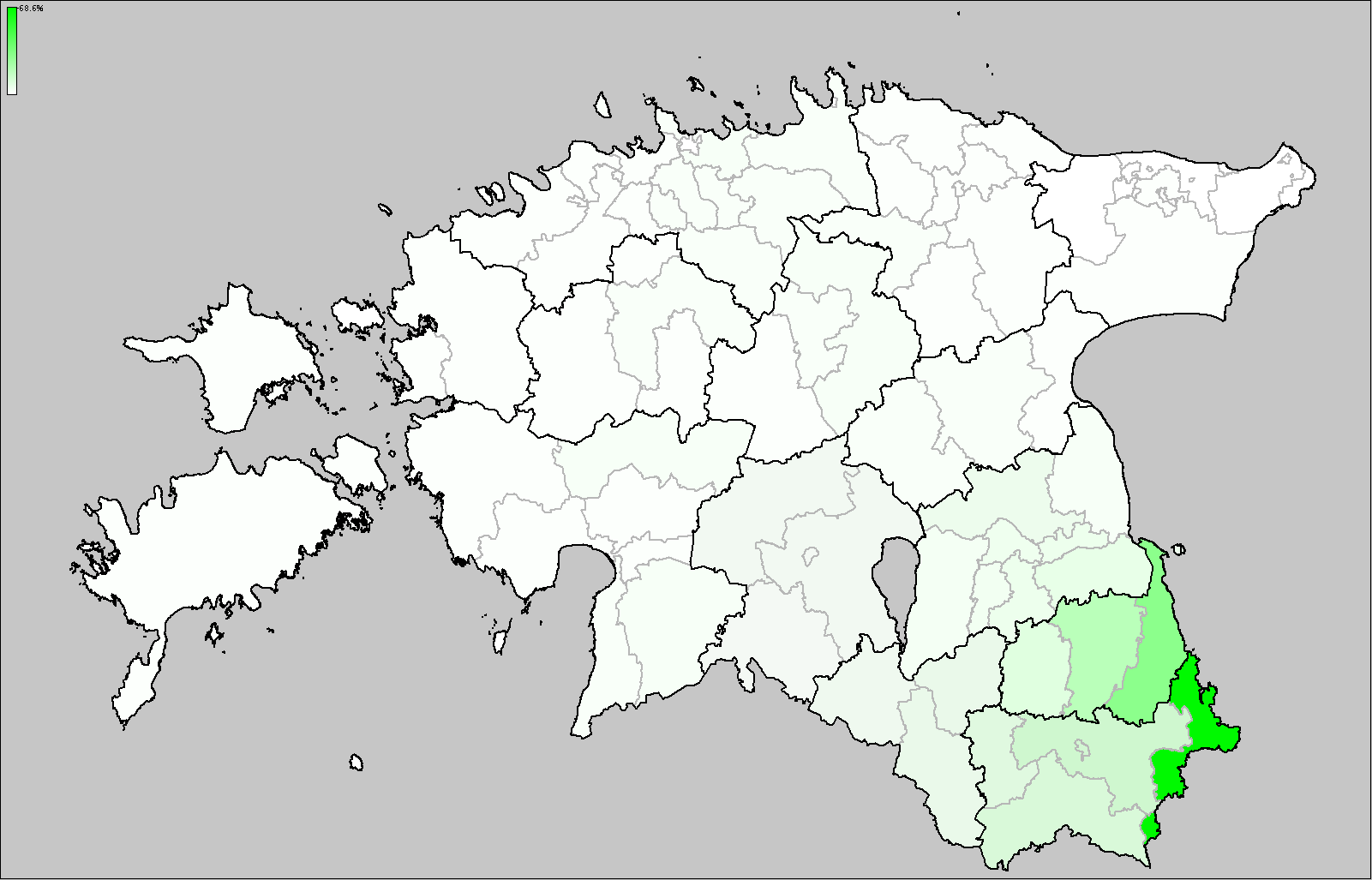
- Distribution of Seto speakers according to the 2021 census.

Seto (seto kiil; Estonian: setu keel) is a dialect of South Estonian spoken by 25,080 people. It is sometimes identified as a variety under Võro, or the two are described as Võro-Seto. Setos (setokõsõq) mostly inhabit the area near Estonia's southeastern border with Russia in Setomaa, and are primarily Eastern Orthodox, while Võros (võrokõsõq) are traditionally Lutherans and live in historical Võru County.

== Phonology ==
=== Vowels ===
| | Front | | Back | |
| | unrounded | rounded | unrounded | rounded |
|---|---|---|---|---|
| Close | i | y | ɯ | u |
| Mid | e | ø | ɤ | o |
| Open | æ | | ɑ | |

- Vowel length is also distinctive.

=== Consonants ===
| | Labial | | Alveolar | | Palatal | Velar | | Glottal | |
| | plain | pal. | plain | pal. | Palatal | plain | pal. | plain | pal. |
|---|---|---|---|---|---|---|---|---|---|
| Plosive | p | pʲ | t | tʲ | | k | kʲ | ʔ | |
| Affricate | | | t͡s | t͡sʲ | | | | | |
| Fricative | v | vʲ | s | sʲ | | | | h | hʲ |
| Nasal | m | mʲ | n | nʲ | | | | | |
| Approximant | | | l | lʲ | j | | | | |
| Rhotic | | | r | rʲ | | | | | |

- Stop, affricate and fricative sounds can also be heard as voiced [b, bʲ, d, dʲ, ɡ, ɡʲ, d͡z, d͡zʲ] and [z, zʲ], when between vowels or within voiced consonants. They also may be written as such ⟨b, b’, d, d’, g, g’, ds, ds’, z, z’⟩.
- Other sounds /f, x/ appear only in loanwords.

== Language sample ==
Article 1 of the Universal Declaration of Human Rights:

- Seto: Kõik inemiseq sünnüseq vapost ja ütesugumaidsist uma avvo ja õiguisi poolõst. Näile om annõt mudsu ja süämetun'stus ja nä piät ütstõõsõga vele muudu läbi kjauma.
- Võro: Kõik inemiseq sünnüseq vapos ja ütesugumaidsis uma avvo ja õiguisi poolõst. Näile om annõt mudsu ja süämetunnistus ja nä piät ütstõõsõga vele muudu läbi käümä.
- Estonian: Kõik inimesed sünnivad vabadena ja võrdsetena oma väärikuselt ja õigustelt. Neile on antud mõistus ja südametunnistus ja nende suhtumist üksteisesse peab kandma vendluse vaim.
- Finnish: Kaikki ihmiset syntyvät vapaina ja tasavertaisina arvoltaan ja oikeuksiltaan. Heille on annettu järki ja omatunto, ja heidän on toimittava toisiaan kohtaan veljeyden hengessä.
- English: All human beings are born free and equal in dignity and rights. They are endowed with reason and conscience and should act towards one another in a spirit of brotherhood.
