= Meldova Chapel =

Chapel in Estonia

- Meldova tsässon
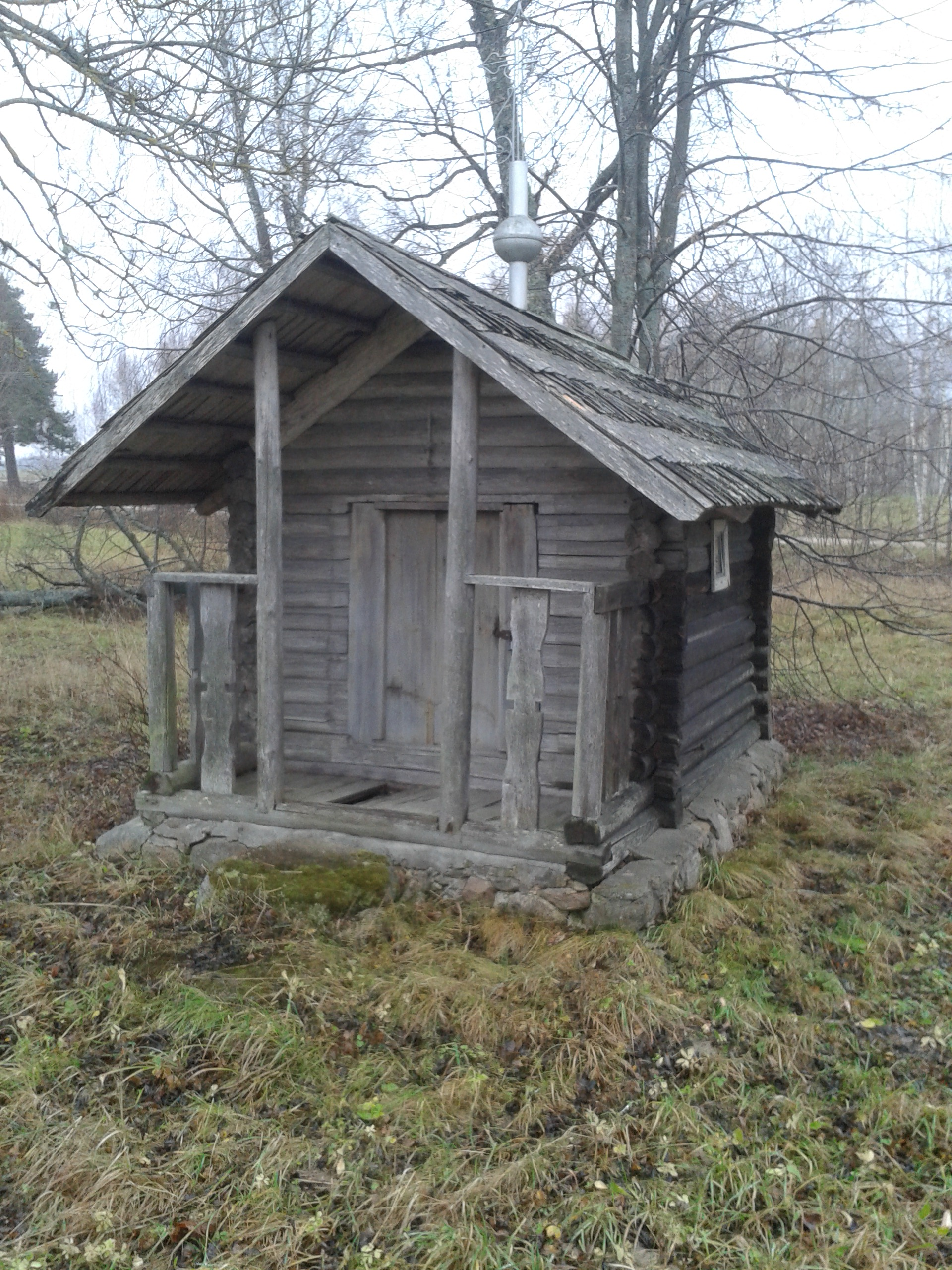

Religion
- Affiliation: Estonian Apostolic Orthodox Church
- Year consecrated: ca 1753

Location
- Location: Polovina, Setomaa Parish, Estonia
- Interactive map of Meldova Chapel
- Coordinates: 57°48′36.97″N 27°30′26.97″E

Architecture
- Materials: wood

Meldova Chapel (Estonian: Meldova tsässon) is a small Seto chapel in Polovina village, Setomaa Parish in Võru County in Estonia, about 5 kilometres east of the village of Obinitsa.

== General information ==
The building is not state protected. It is in good condition. The estimated time of building is 1753 (Läänelaid et al. 2005). The chapel is dedicated to the Great martyr St. Anastasia. In addition to Meldova, November 11, also known as Nahtsipäev is a chapel feast in Uusvada, Rokina, Serga, Küllätüvä and Matsuri. According to a folk myth, it was built by Saava Kirillov who once discovered the icon of St. Anastasia and decided to build a sanctuary as there were no chapels dedicated to Anastasia in the region. Anastasia (in Seto language Nahtsi) is a martyr in church tradition, Seto people speak of her as the protector of women and a health saint. The grandchild of Saava, Gabril Kirillo, renovated the chapel and also replaced the cross on the roof with a new one.

== Building data ==
Meldova Chapel is a small pine cross-beam building, which has a square floor plan and backwards halving with one interior room (ca 5 m^{2}) and an open entrance room. The dimensions of the chapel are 382 (l) x 256 (w) cm together with the entrance-room, which makes up 83 cm of the total building. The entrance-room has a saw-profiled barrier made from vertical boards. There has probably never been a gate. The door posts have been hand hewn. The leaf of the door is made from two hand-hewn wide boards fixed on the crosspiece. Two granite stones are used in front of the entrance as stairs. The height of the building from the granite stone foundation to where the rafter and the wall unite is 1.77 m. Some of the logs have been replaced in time. The chapel does not have any boarding on the inside or on the outside. The wall in the north-west has a single-pane wooden window. A former hole for a cauldron is situated in the south-eastern wall in the penultimate upper log. There is no ceiling or floor beams. The floor is made of half-beams hewn from above; they are about 12–17 cm of diameter on average. Half-beams have been tenoned in the end walls. It is probable that the floor is original. At first, the building had a board-roof, as the baulks with raising-plate construction and earlier photos indicate. Today, the roof has a double fir tree-shingle roof. The earlier raising-plate baulks have been replaced by hewn barling baulks. A tall metal welded cross is also on the roof, placed on a round dome. The cross of today was made in the 1990s during the replacement of the roof and made on the example of the old cross.

== Furnishing ==
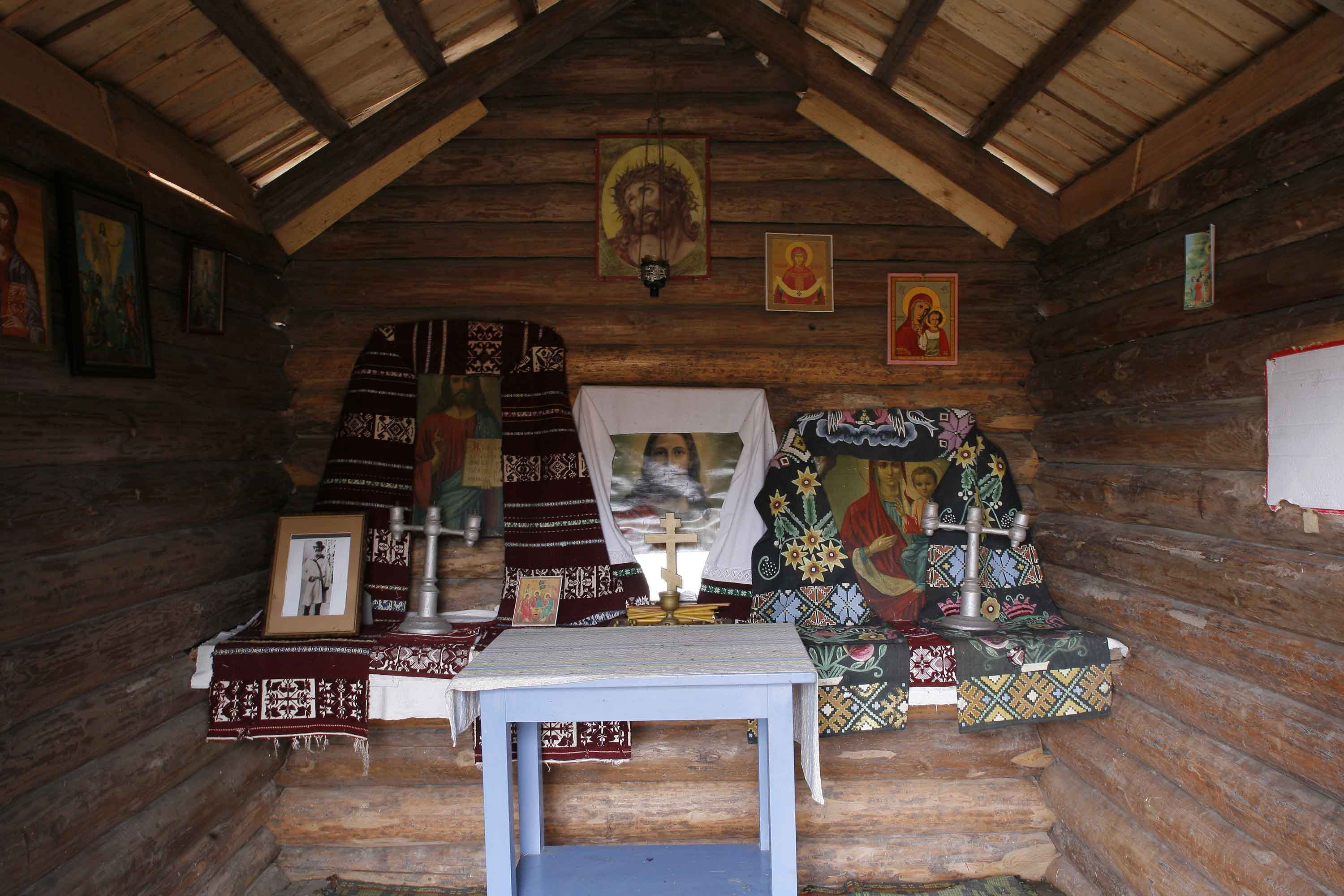
Interior view of Meldova Chapel in 2008

A long icon table is attached between the logs along the back wall. There are icons on the icon table that have been covered by differently patterned icon scarves: a woven icon scarf made from wool, a painted icon scarf and a fine linen icon scarf with woven patterned ends. There are two candle sticks on the icon table. A table is situated in front of the icon table, in the middle of the chapel. A simple oil lamp hangs from the ceiling. There are printed icons and images on the back and side walls. During inventory-taking of 1974, several icons have been denoted, most of them have disappeared by now: Icon with the image of ascetic Serafim, martyr Anastasia and Paraskeva, icon with two saints on it, icon with the image of Pechory Mother of God (a copy of the original Mother of God of Pechory, the imprimatur of which was received from the censor of Moscow on 10 March 1887). The lamp (lampatka) that hangs in front of the icons has been referred to as very interesting, as it is made from light grey porcelain and dark red glass (Kupp 1974).
