= Swisspearl =

Swiss fibre cement company group

Swisspearl Group AG
- Company type: Aktiengesellschaft
- Industry: Building materials
- Founded: 1903 (Swiss origin, as Schweizerische Eternit-Werke AG)
- Headquarters: Niederurnen, Switzerland
- Area served: Europe
- Key people: Giulia Alpstaeg
- Products: Fibre cement facades, roofing, interior cladding, garden products, photovoltaics
- Owner: Alpstaeg family
- Number of employees: ~2,400
- Website: www.swisspearl.com

Swisspearl (formally Swisspearl Group AG) is a Swiss building-materials company headquartered in Niederurnen, in the canton of Glarus, that manufactures fibre cement products for facades, roofing, interiors, and gardens. Wholly owned by the family of the entrepreneur Bernhard Alpstaeg, it is one of the largest fibre cement producers in Europe. Its Swiss operating company traces its origins to 1903, and the group has used the Eternit and Swisspearl brands.

== History ==
=== Eternit in Switzerland ===
The group's Swiss core was founded in 1903 under the name Schweizerische Eternit-Werke AG, for the licensed manufacture of Eternit fibre cement materials, and was known as Eternit AG from 1923. Before the Second World War, as one of the leading companies in the canton of Glarus, it acquired a worldwide reputation in the asbestos cement industry through the sale of products and technology abroad and overseas. It opened a branch at Payerne in 1957. A costly research program between 1976 and 1994 made it possible to produce asbestos-free fibre cement. The company manufactured roof and facade slates, flat and corrugated panels, and accessories for the garden and interior fitting; pipe production, begun in 1928, was abandoned in 1997. Eternit employed 954 people in 1996 for a turnover of 119 million francs, which fell to 89.1 million in 2003 because of the building-industry crisis, while the firm faced the deterioration of its image and the payment of damages to asbestos victims.

From 1996 to 2003 Eternit was part of the worldwide Holderbank, later Holcim, building-materials group. In November 2003 BA Holding AG, owned by the entrepreneur Bernhard Alpstaeg, acquired all the shares of Eternit AG, with Alpstaeg becoming chairman of the board. In 2005 the operating works at Niederurnen and Payerne were transferred to Etertub AG, a subsidiary founded in 1997, which was renamed Eternit (Schweiz) AG, while the former Eternit AG became FibreCem Holding AG.

=== Expansion and renaming as Swisspearl ===
In 2009 FibreCem Holding AG acquired the Austrian company Eternit-Werke Ludwig Hatschek AG of Vöcklabruck—the works where fibre cement had originally been developed—buying an 80% stake from Cross Industries AG in July 2009 and the remaining 20% later that year. At the start of 2016, FibreCem Holding AG was renamed Swisspearl Group AG. The company had used the export brand Swisspearl since 2002.

In June 2022 the Swisspearl Group acquired the Danish fibre-cement manufacturer Cembrit, based in Aalborg, from the Swedish investment company Solix. Before the acquisition the group employed about 1,200 people at four production sites in Switzerland, Austria, and Slovenia, while Cembrit predominantly served the Nordic countries, Ireland, and the United Kingdom; the combination created a roughly 2,600-employee company and made Swisspearl the second-largest fibre cement producer in Europe.

With three brand names in use after the Cembrit acquisition, the group decided to consolidate under a single name. Eternit (Schweiz) AG was renamed Swisspearl Schweiz AG on 1 April 2023, and the Eternit and Cembrit brands were brought together under the Swisspearl name; the Eternit name survives in some product names. The group employs around 2,400 people and operates nine production sites in Europe, producing fibre cement products for the building envelope, interiors, gardens, fire protection, and photovoltaic systems.

== Bibliography ==
- Geschichte der Eternit AG seit ihrer Gründung im Jahre 1903, 1995
- Eternit Suisse, exhibition catalogue, Zürich and Lausanne, 2003
- R. von Arx et al., Industriekultur im Kanton Glarus, 2005
