= Luikjärve farm =

Farm house and museum in Estonia

- Luikjärve talu
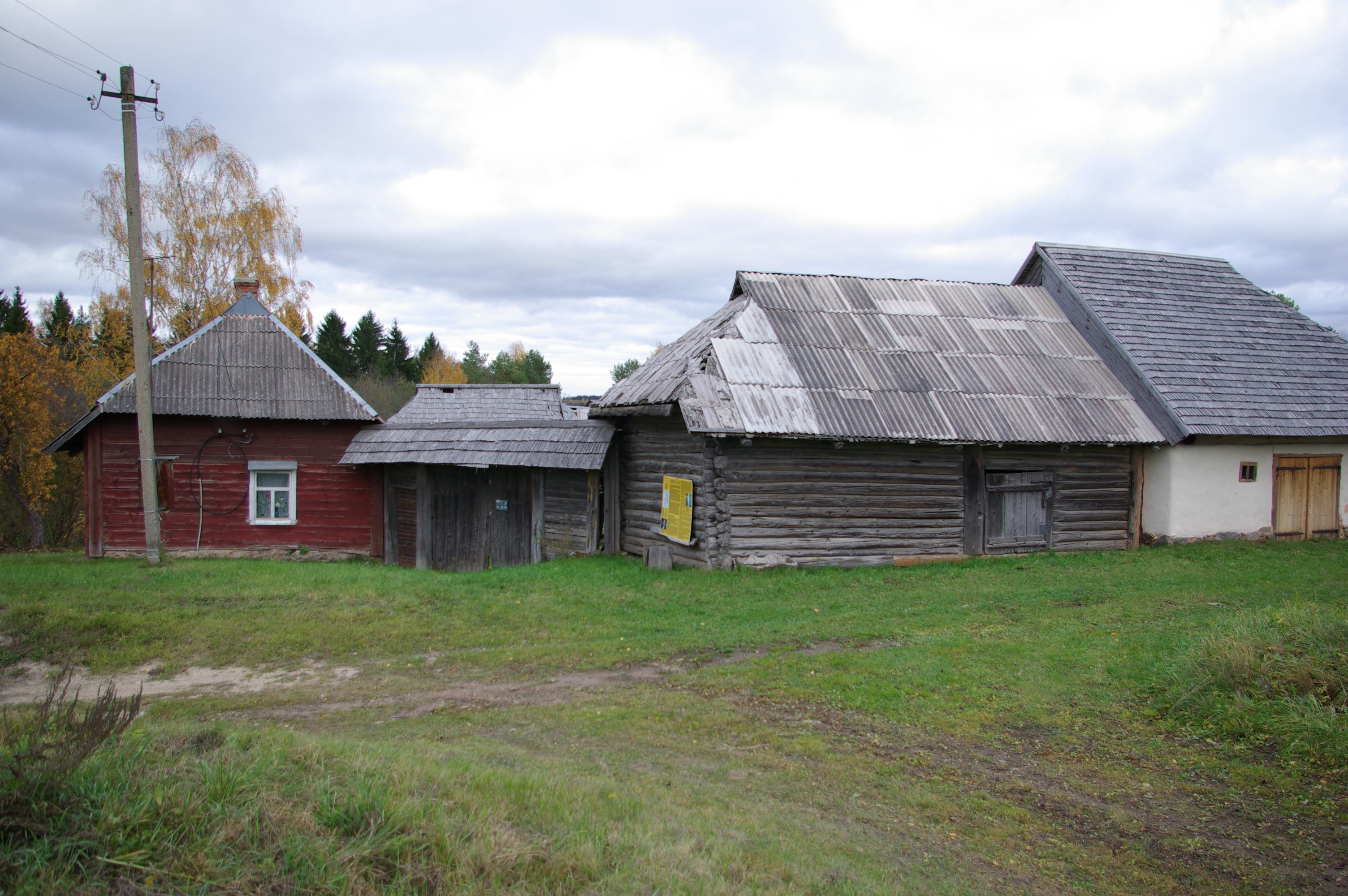
- Luikjärve farm
- Interactive map of the Luikjärve farm area

General information
- Type: museum
- Location: Tobrova, Estonia
- Coordinates: 57°46′30″N 27°27′43″E

Website
- www.obinitsamuuseum.ee

Luikjärve farm is an affiliate of Obinitsa Museum in Meremäe rural municipality, in Tobrova village in Estonia; it is a typical Seto fortress-farm.

Obinitsa Museum consists of two parts - Obinitsa Seto Muuseumitarõ in the village of Obinitsa and the Luikjärve farm, a Seto fortress-farm that has been reconstructed 4 km from Obinitsa. The Luikjärve farm will be opened as an experience farm. Until then, visitors can see the farm during the events held there and also when calling ahead. The farm is located on the 6th kilometre of the road from Meremäe to Obinitsa on the right, in the village of Tobrova, by Tuhkvitsa Creek. The farm got its water from Tuhkvitsa Creek. It is a typical example of the so-called fortress-farm in Setumaa. It has an enclosed yard made up of the buildings, high gates, and fences. Tobrova Chapel is also located on the farm's territory.
