= Polovina =

Polovina may refer to:

Places

- Polovina, Albania (sq), village in Perondi Municipality, Kuçovë District, Berat County, Albania
- Polovina, Estonia, village in Meremäe Parish, Võru County, Estonia
- Polovina, Vologda Oblast, Russia
- Polovina Hill, St. Paul Island, Alaska, United States of America

People

- Himzo Polovina (1927–1986), Bosnian singer and songwriter
