= Rokina Chapel =

Chapel in Setomaa, Estonia

- Rokina tsässon
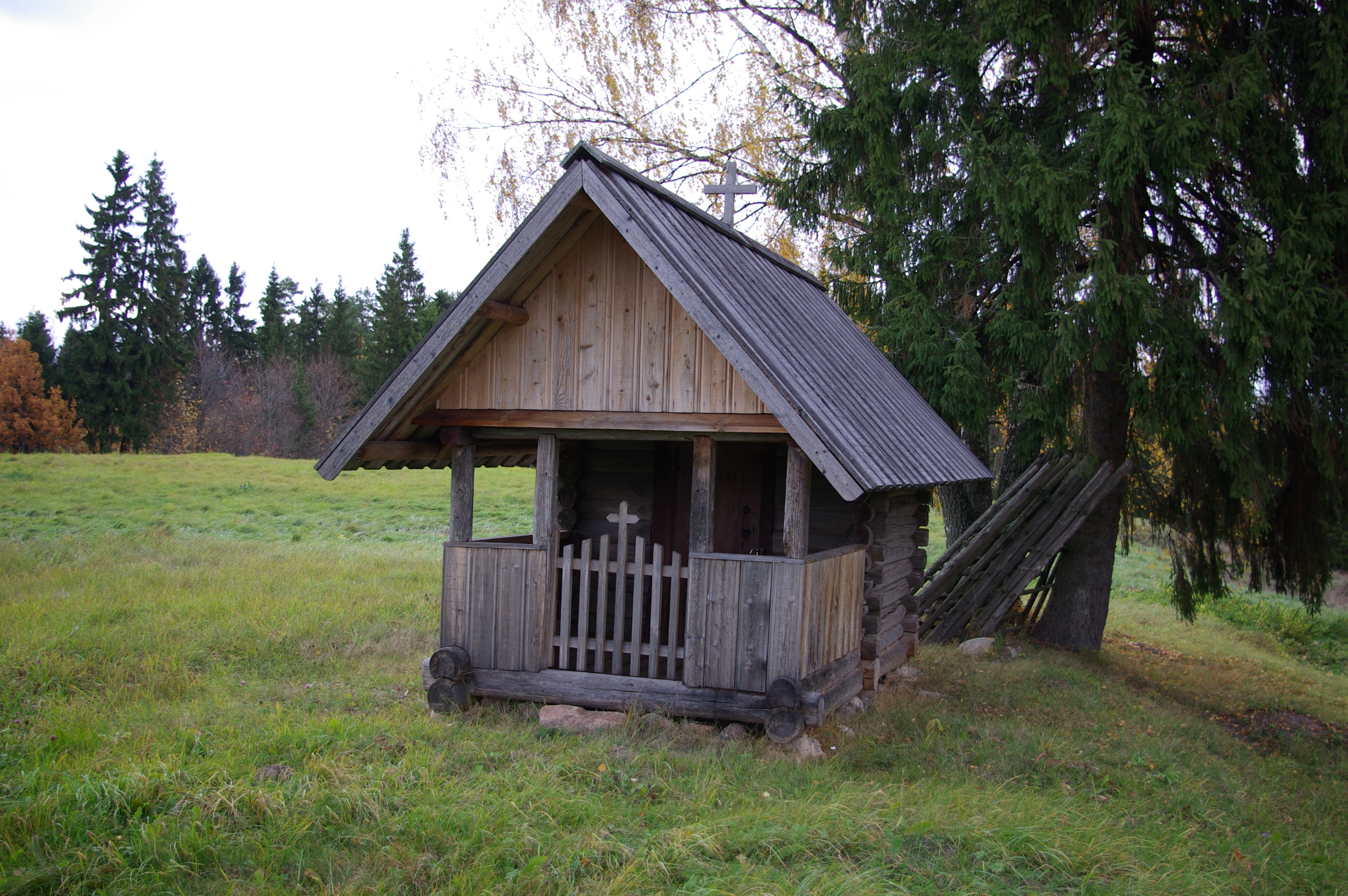

Religion
- Affiliation: Estonian Apostolic Orthodox Church
- Year consecrated: ca 1711

Location
- Location: Rokina, Setomaa Parish, Estonia
- Interactive map of Rokina Chapel
- Coordinates: 57°47′46″N 27°26′35″E

Architecture
- Materials: wood

Rokina Chapel (Estonian: Rokina tsässon) is a small Seto chapel in the village of Rokina, Setomaa Parish, Võru County in southeastern Estonia.

== General information ==
Rokina Chapel is dedicated to Saint Anastasia and 11 November is a commemoration day (Nahtsipäev) for Anastasia (29 October according to Julian calendar). The chapel is not in constant use. The building is not state-protected and is in good condition. The last renovation was done with the funding from a state programme “Preservation and development of sanctuaries” in 2009. In the course of renovation, lower beams were replaced, the entrance-room was fixed up and an eternit roof was replaced by a board roof.

== Building data ==
Rokina Chapel is a small, one-storied pine cross-beam building, has a square floor plan and a gable roof, the outer measurements of which together with the entrance-room are 390 x 230 cm. The beam part of the building is square (242 x 240 cm), surface area on the inside is about 3 m2. The chapel has an open entrance-room (about 4 m2) with round logs that have slightly profiled angles that support the roof and about a metre high fence made from upright boarding. The gate is made from vertical fencing with the upper part of it arched. There is a cross on the highest fence board in the middle of the gate. The height of the building from the ground up to where the rafter and the wall unite is 160 cm and the height up to the ridge is 310 cm. The ridge has a simple wooden cross on it. The logs of the building are standing on granite stones and are tied in the corners by axe hewn halving. The dimensions of the door are 64 x 141 cm. The door is made up from three axe-hewn wide boards fixed on the crosspiece and painted over with red paint. The door opens on the inside. The vertical supporting posts are axe-hewn; the log above the door is hewn curved. The door is fixed on the supporting posts by forged 30 cm hinges that are not original. There is a cutting made inside the beams above the door for the entry icon. There are no windows. Originally, the building had a board roof, as can be seen from the raising-plate construction. During the last renovation, the eternit roof was replaced once again by a board roof. The eternit roof was put on the building after 1975; according to the Dr. Fr. R. Kreutzwald Memorial Museum 1974 notes (Kupp 1974) the building had a shattered board roof. It is also noted that in the earlier years, the chapel was painted red, but the paint had worn out. The building on the photograph taken around the 1920s had no boarding, with the board roof leaning on lengthwise raising-plates and no entrance-room. There is a wooden Latin cross in the place of the former recess for an icon, under the gables in the upper frontal part of the building. In the 1974 photo, the building has an entrance-room that has been preserved up to today.

== Furnishing ==
The rear-wall of the chapel has an icon shelf with a few icons. Formerly, this chapel had an icon depicting Paraskeva, St Nicholas the Miracle-Maker and Anastasia (Kupp 1974) and an icon stand.
