= Uusvada Chapel =

Chapel in Setomaa, Estonia

- Uusvada tsässon
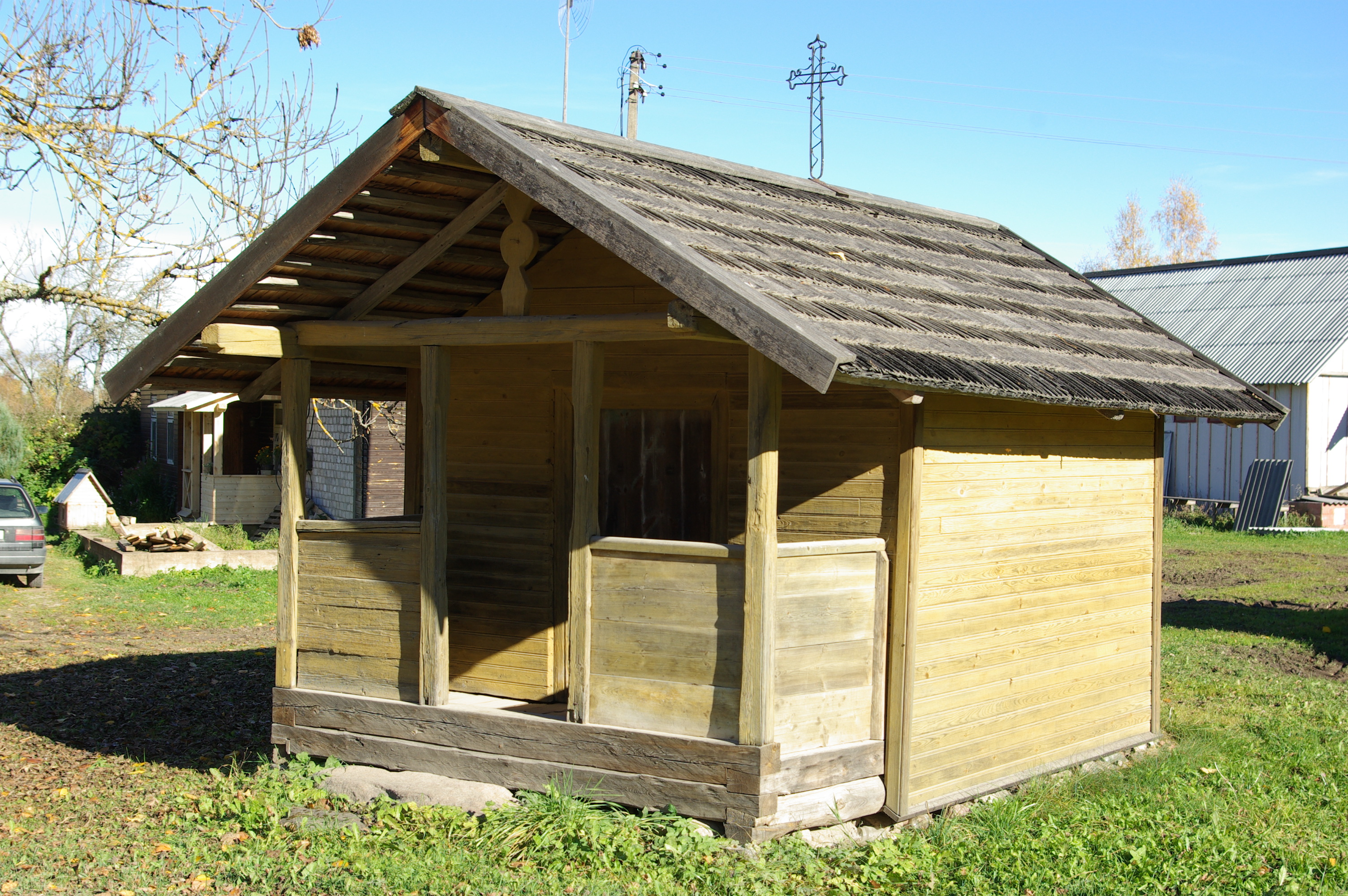

Religion
- Affiliation: Estonian Apostolic Orthodox Church
- Year consecrated: 1698

Location
- Location: Uusvada, Setomaa Parish, Estonia
- Interactive map of Uusvada Chapel
- Coordinates: 57°46′12.28″N 27°29′2.23″E

Architecture
- Materials: Wood

Uusvada Chapel (Estonian: Uusvada tsässon) is a small Seto chapel in Uusvada village, Setomaa Parish, Võru County, Estonia, dedicated to Saint Anastasia also known as Saint Anastasia's Chapel (Estonian: Nahtsi tsässon). Saint Anastasia's Day (Estonian: Nahtsipäev) is on 11 November. Probable time of building is 1698.

== General information ==
The building is not state-protected. It is in good condition. The last renovation was done with the funding from the state programme "Preservation and development of sanctuaries" in 2008–2009. This tsässon has been used to keep dead people in it.

== Building data ==
Uusvada Chapel is a small one-storied unhewn pine cross-beam building, which has a square floor plan and a gable roof, the outer measurements are 308 x 409 cm; the building has one interior room (7.2 m^{2}) and an external shelter (2.5 m^{2}). The shelter has wane beam posts and a horizontal wide boarding fence. The main part of the building is covered by narrow horizontal boarding from the outside; from the inside the beams are uncovered. The beams are bound by axe-hewn corner tenon joints from the corners. The walls of the building stand on granite stones. The height of the building from the ground up to where the rafter and the wall unite is 188 cm and the height up to the ridge is 320 cm. There is a wooden decoration sawn round and tenoned vertically in the front end of the ridge raising-plate. There are no ceiling or floor beams. The building has a floor made of half-beams axe-hewn on the top. They support on the slots in the front wall. The width of the beams is different, 10 cm on average. The floor of the entrance-room is original and consists of the same half-beams axe-hewn on top. The building has one round ridge raising-plate remaining and rafters with hewn sides and profiled ends. During 2009 renovation, the chapel got a new shingle roof and a forged cross that was on the ridge during the 1980s. The door of the building is probably original. The leaf of the door is made from four wide boards fixed on the crosspiece, sized 153 x 84 cm. The door opens on the inside and is fixed on the hewn supporting posts by forged hinges. The door is not painted. There is no handle on it, old forged staple and clamp have remained on the outside, but the building is not locked. A finely drawn orthodox cross on the outside of the door is especially noteworthy. Looking at the earlier photos, it is possible to fixate the time of the different re-buildings of the chapel: A photo from the beginning of the 20th century shows that the exterior walls are without planks, there is a shingle-roof and the entrance-room is exposed. The walls on the 1974 photo have narrow planks on them; part of the entrance-room fence is also replaced by planks. There is a shingle-roof and a different cross than before. From the photo dating back to the 1980s, it can be seen that the shingle-roof had eternit installed on top of it and there is no cross. At the end of the 1980s, a different cross had been placed on the roof.

== Furnishing ==
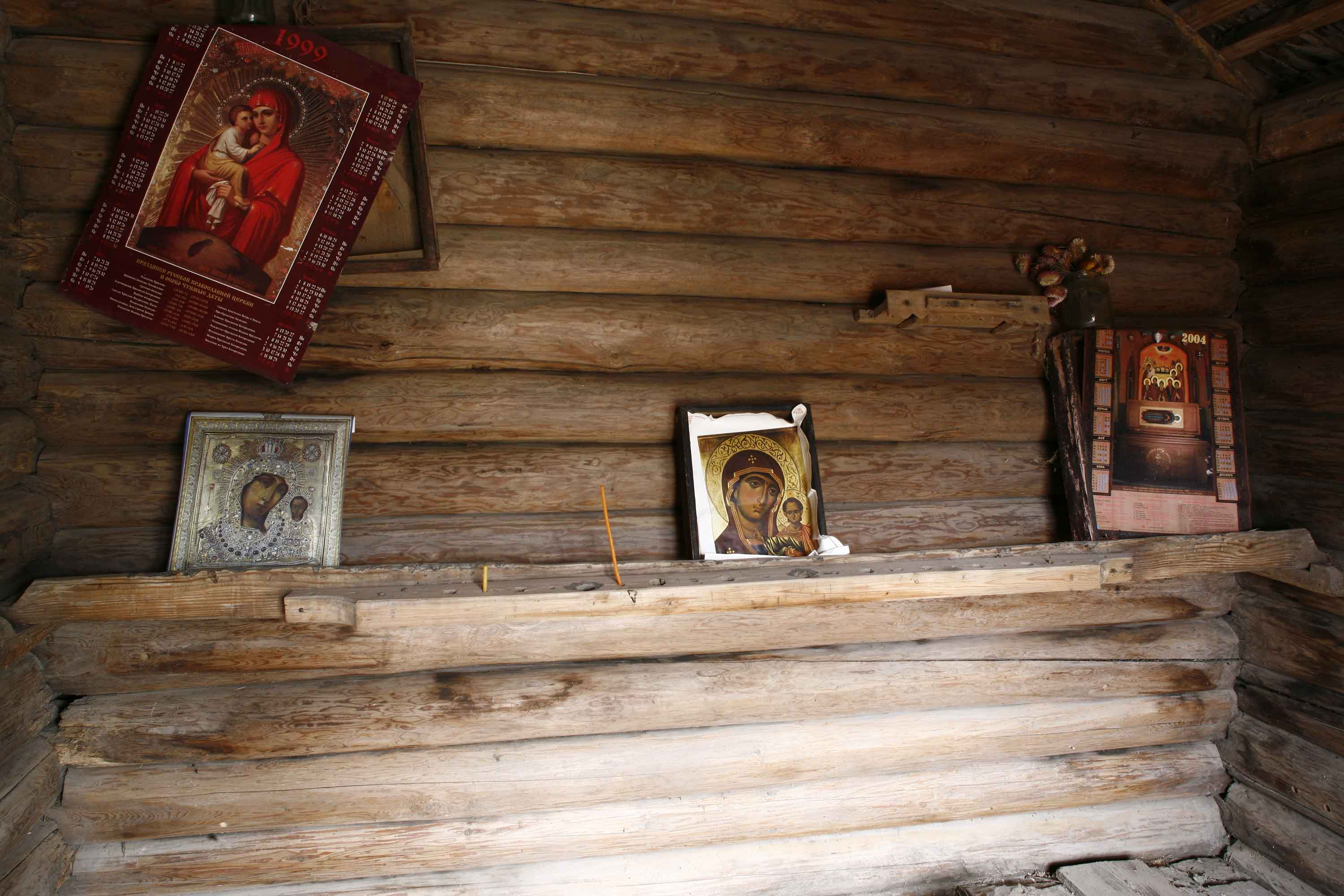
Interior view of Uusvada Chapel in 2008

There is a wooden icon table on the rear wall of the building. A candle table is attached to it, with holes drilled inside for the candles. A little higher is a shelf for one icon with embellished front edge. Three old icon frames are situated on the icon shelf and in the rear wall, with new printed icon pictures in them. According to 1974 descriptions (Kupp 1974) the icons were still there, but had decomposed. There are a few printed icons hung on the rear wall. A forged hook fixed on the ceiling for holding an oil lamp has also remained from earlier times. During 1974 expedition, a few interesting furnishings were discovered, described as follows: “A few ethnographic items may be of interest: 2 candle sticks. Both of them have been made of wood, first one is carved, the other one probably turned. The bases are round-shaped. A bench for the fresh-harvested crop. The bench is hewn from boards, it is rather old. The length of the bench is 1.09 m, width 0.41 m, height 0.72 m. It is of museal interest.” (Kupp 1974).
