= Těšetice =

Těšetice may refer to places in the Czech Republic:

- Těšetice (Olomouc District), a municipality and village in the Olomouc Region
- Těšetice (Znojmo District), a municipality and village in the South Moravian Region
- Těšetice, a village and part of Bochov in the Karlovy Vary Region
