= List of heritage sites in Bellville =

This is a list of the heritage sites in Bellville (City of Cape Town, South Africa) as recognized by the South African Heritage Resources Agency.

| SAHRA identifier | Site name | Description | Town | District | NHRA status | Coordinates | Image |
|---|---|---|---|---|---|---|---|
| 9/2/012/0001 | Vault, Meyboom Avenue, Plattekloof Extension No. 3, Parow | Type of site: Vault | Cape Town, Plattekloof | Bellville | Provincial Heritage Site | 33°51′59″S 18°35′01″E | Type of site: Vault |
| 9/2/012/0002 | 20 Oxford Street, Durbanville | | Durbanville | Bellville | | 33°49′51″S 18°39′01″E | Upload Photo |
| 9/2/012/0003 | DURBANVILLE MUNICIPAL AREA, GENERAL | | Durbanville | Bellville | | | Upload Photo |
| 9/2/012/0004 | 46 Oxford Street, Durbanville | | Durbanville | Bellville | | 33°49′44″S 18°38′44″E | |
| 9/2/012/0005 | All Saints Anglican Church, Durbanville | Type of site: Church Current use: Church : Anglican. This complex is closely associated with the history and development of Durbanville. The All Saints Church was designed by architect Sophy Gray. The church and the older parsonage are predominantly in the Victorian style. | Durbanville | Bellville | Provincial Heritage Site | 33°50′05″S 18°38′58″E | Upload Photo |
| 9/2/012/0006 | BELLVILLE MUNICIPAL AREA, GENERAL | | Bellville | Bellville | | | Upload Photo |
| 9/2/012/0007 | Welgemoed Farmstead, Tygerberg Bellville | | Bellville | Bellville | | | Media related to De Oude Welgemoed at Wikimedia Commons |
| 9/2/012/0008 | Berghshoop, Durbanville | | Durbanville | Bellville | | 33°49′56″S 18°40′13″E | Upload Photo |
| 9/2/012/0009 | PAROW MUNICIPAL AREA, GENERAL | | Parow | Bellville | | | Upload Photo |
| 9/2/012/0010 | King's Court, 4 Church Street, Durbanville | Type of site: House | Durbanville | Bellville | Provincial Heritage Site | 33°49′59″S 18°38′58″E | Type of site: House |
| 9/2/012/0011 | Nineteenth Century Rubbish Dump, St.Vincent Street, Belhar, Bellville | | Bellville | Bellville | | | Upload Photo |
| 9/2/012/0012 | Milestone XII and Oil lamp, cnr Voortrekker and Durban Roads, Bellville | Type of site: Milestone | Bellville | Bellville | Provincial Heritage Site | 33°54′04″S 18°37′37″E | Type of site: Milestone |
| 9/2/012/0013 | Oil lamp, cnr Voortrekker and Durban Roads, Bellville | Type of site: Lamppost | Bellville | Bellville | Provincial Heritage Site | 33°54′05″S 18°37′37″E | Type of site: Lamppost |
| 9/2/012/0014 | Dutch Reformed Church, Weyers Street, Durbanville | The foundation-stone of the Dutch Reformed Church at Durbanville was laid on 1 April 1825 and the church itself was consecrated on 6 August 1826. The T -shaped church building was enlarged between 1890 and 1891 according to plans by the architect Charles; Type of site: Church; Current use: Church : Dutch Reformed. | Durbanville | Bellville | Provincial Heritage Site | 33°50′12″S 18°38′48″E | The foundation-stone of the Dutch Reformed Church at Durbanville was laid on 1 April 1825 and the church itself was consecrated on 6 August 1826. The T -shaped church building was enlarged between 1890 and 1891 according to plans by the architect Charles Type of site: Church Current use: Church : Dutch Reformed. |
| 9/2/012/0015 | 66 Hopkins Street, Parow | Late Victorian style double storey house. Hipped gable pitched roof with fibre cement slates. Double storey bay to left hand side of facade. Double storey cast iron filigree verandah intact. Ashlar plasterwork, quoining and plaster surrounds. Decorative These two impressive double-storey dwelling-houses with their Edwardian and Victorian features were erected in 1910 by George Thomas Hopkins. The magnificent cast- iron verandah and balcony at 66 Hopkins Street were presumably added by Johannes Petrus Ser; Type of site: House; Current use: House. These two impressive double-storey dwelling-houses with their Edwardian and Victorian features were erected in 1910 by George Thomas Hopkins. The magnificent cast-iron verandah and balcony at 66 Hopkins Street were presumably added by Johannes Petrus Sere | Parow | Bellville | Provincial Heritage Site | 33°54′03″S 18°35′12″E | Late Victorian style double storey house. Hipped gable pitched roof with fibre cement slates. Double storey bay to left hand side of facade. Double storey cast iron filigree verandah intact. Ashlar plasterwork, quoining and plaster surrounds. Decorative These two impressive double-storey dwelling-houses with their Edwardian and Victorian features were erected in 1910 by George Thomas Hopkins. The magnificent cast- iron verandah and balcony at 66 Hopkins Street were presumably added by Johannes Petrus Ser Type of site: House Current use: House. These two impressive double-storey dwelling-houses with their Edwardian and Victorian features were erected in 1910 by George Thomas Hopkins. The magnificent cast-iron verandah and balcony at 66 Hopkins Street were presumably added by Johannes Petrus Sere Media related to 66 Hopkins Street, Parow at Wikimedia Commons |
| 9/2/012/0016 | 64 Hopkins Street, Parow | Late Victorian style double storey house. Hipped and gabled pitched roof with fibre cement slates. Double storey bay to left hand side of facade. Double storey cast iron filigree verandah at entrance of which a portion remains. Ashlar plasterwork, These two impressive double-storey dwelling-houses with their Edwardian and Victorian features were erected in 1910 by George Thomas Hopkins. The magnificent cast- iron verandah and balcony at 66 Hopkins Street were presumably added by Johannes Petrus Ser; Type of site: House; Current use: House. | Parow | Bellville | Provincial Heritage Site | 33°54′04″S 18°35′12″E | Late Victorian style double storey house. Hipped and gabled pitched roof with fibre cement slates. Double storey bay to left hand side of facade. Double storey cast iron filigree verandah at entrance of which a portion remains. Ashlar plasterwork, These two impressive double-storey dwelling-houses with their Edwardian and Victorian features were erected in 1910 by George Thomas Hopkins. The magnificent cast- iron verandah and balcony at 66 Hopkins Street were presumably added by Johannes Petrus Ser Type of site: House Current use: House. Media related to 64 Hopkins Street, Parow at Wikimedia Commons |
| 9/2/012/0017 | Onze Molen, Durbanville | The present mill structure consists of a truncated—cone tower built of coffee stone and plastered with mud. It has been lime washed. The structure which originally had a domed shaped cap and sails, was built about 1850. For many years it served as a wind— This structure, known as Onze Molen, was recorded in 1850 as only the second tower-mill in the Malmesbury district. It was erected in 1840 and served as a windmill till after the turn of the century when the mechanism and the top portion of the mill were Type of site: Wind Mill; Previous use: Mill. | Durbanville | Bellville | Provincial Heritage Site | 33°49′56″S 18°38′21″E | The present mill structure consists of a truncated—cone tower built of coffee stone and plastered with mud. It has been lime washed. The structure which originally had a domed shaped cap and sails, was built about 1850. For many years it served as a wind— This structure, known as Onze Molen, was recorded in 1850 as only the second tower-mill in the Malmesbury district. It was erected in 1840 and served as a windmill till after the turn of the century when the mechanism and the top portion of the mill were Type of site: Wind Mill Previous use: Mill. Media related to Onze Molen, Durbanville at Wikimedia Commons |
| 9/2/012/0018 | Rust-en-Vrede, Wellington Road, Durbanville | The so-called Rust-en-Vrede building complex, which dates predominantly from the mid nineteenth century, reflects a harmonious blending of Cape Dutch, Georgian and Victorian architectural elements. Since its erection the complex has served as a prison, a | Durbanville | Bellville | Provincial Heritage Site | 33°49′55″S 18°38′56″E | The so-called Rust-en-Vrede building complex, which dates predominantly from the mid nineteenth century, reflects a harmonious blending of Cape Dutch, Georgian and Victorian architectural elements. Since its erection the complex has served as a prison, a |
| 9/2/012/0019 | Police Station Church Street, Durbanville | | Durbanville | Bellville | | 33°50′01″S 18°38′57″E | |
| 9/2/012/0020-001 | Cape Flats Nature Reserve, University of the Western Cape, Bellville South | Type of site: Nature Reserve This nature reserve of more than 20 hectares provides a haven for rare and typical flora and fauna of the Cape Flats. The reserve is a unique conservation project, and offers opportunity for research into diseases and the propagation of the Cape flora. | Cape Town | Bellville | Provincial Heritage Site | 33°56′11″S 18°37′18″E | Upload Photo |
| 9/2/012/0021 | Evertsdal Homestead, Durban Road, Bellville | Oldest house in Eversdal | Bellville | Bellville | | 33°51′23″S 18°38′40″E | Oldest house in Eversdal |
| 9/2/012/0022 | 12 Queen Street, Durbanville | | Durbanville | Bellville | | 33°49′55″S 18°38′42″E | |
| 9/2/012/0023 | BELLVILLE MAGISTERIAL DISTRICT, GENERAL | | Bellville | Bellville | | | Upload Photo |
| 9/2/012/0024 | 21 Vrede Street, Durbanville | | Durbanville | Bellville | Pending Declaration | 33°54′01″S 18°37′50″E | Upload Photo |
| 9/2/012/0025 | Bloemhof, Bloemhof Street, Bellville | | Bellville | Bellville | | 33°52′53″S 18°38′38″E | Upload Photo |
| 9/2/012/0026 | Altydgedacht Farm, Durbanville | | Durbanville | Bellville | | 33°50′50″S 18°37′25″E | Upload Photo |
| 9/2/012/0027 | 22 Oxford Street, Durbanville | | Durbanville | Bellville | | 33°49′52″S 18°38′59″E | Upload Photo |
| 9/2/012/0028 | EDGEMEAD LOCAL AREA, GENERAL | | Edgemead | Bellville | | | Upload Photo |
| 9/2/012/0029 | JOOSTENBERGVLAKTE LOCAL AREA, GENERAL | | Joostenbergvlakte | Bellville | | | Upload Photo |
