= Küllätüvä Chapel =

Chapel in Setomaa, Estonia

- Küllätüvä tsässon
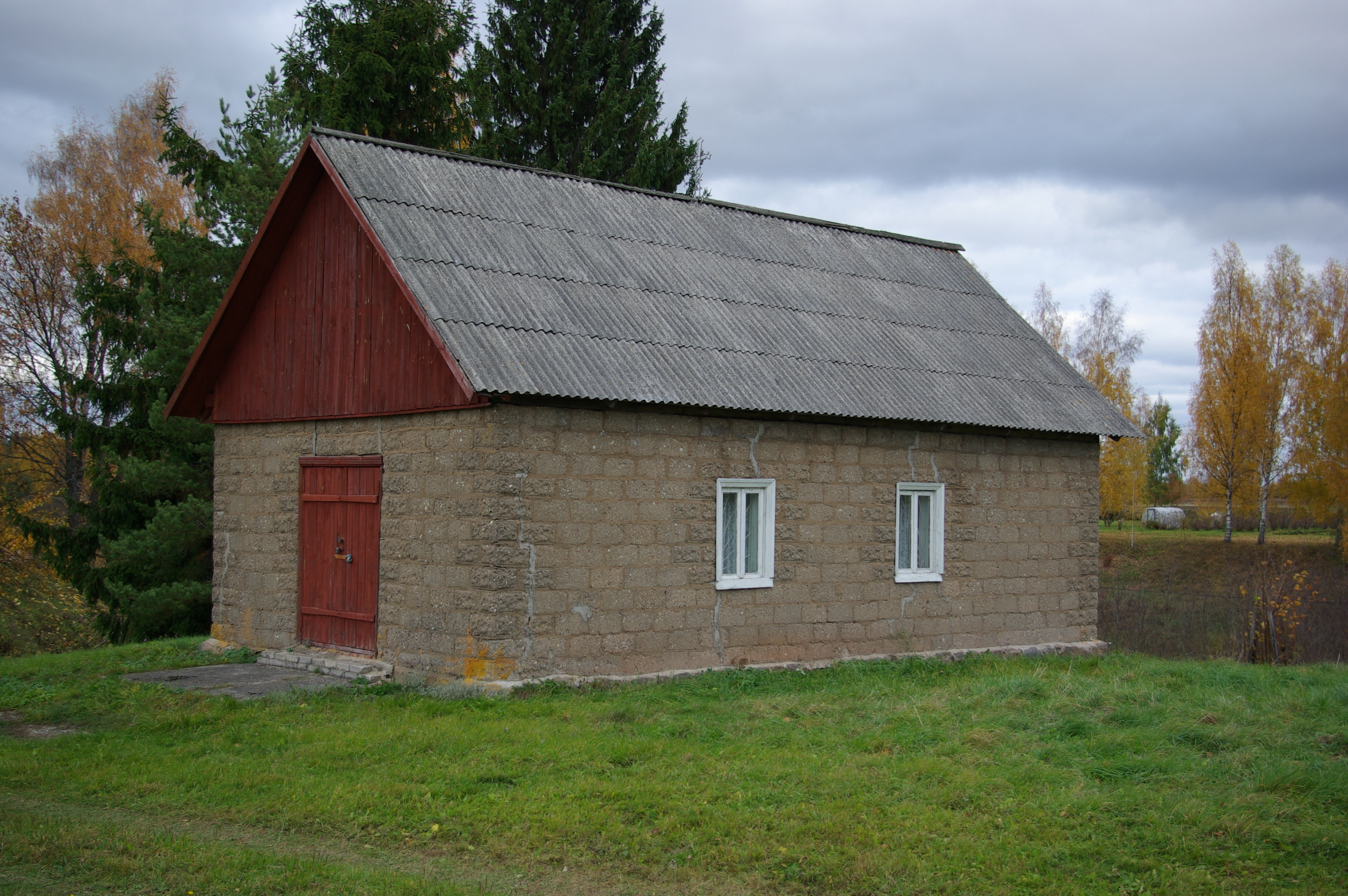

Religion
- Affiliation: Estonian Apostolic Orthodox Church
- Year consecrated: 1925–1928

Location
- Location: Küllätüvä, Setomaa Parish, Estonia
- Interactive map of Küllätüvä Chapel
- Coordinates: 57°47′34.01″N 27°28′12.65″E

Küllätüvä Chapel (Estonian: Küllätüvä tsässon) is a small Seto chapel in Estonia dedicated to Saint Anastasia, also known as Saint Anastasia Chapel (Estonian: Nahtsi tsässon). The feast of Saint Anastasia (Estonian: Nahtsipäev) is on 11 November. The chapel was built during 1925–1928 at the site of an earlier, decayed chapel.

== General information ==
The chapel is located in the village of Küllätüvä, Meremäe rural municipality in Võru County. It stands in the middle of the village and there is a spring with limestone curbs nearby. The building is not state-protected. It is in good condition. According to the 1974 data from the Dr. Fr. R. Kreutzwald Memorial Museum expedition (Kupp 1974), the chapel was built by men from Lillepuu farm. The service was held on 11 November at 10 am. Usually, there were about a hundred people at Küllätüva Nahtsipäev, the villagers as well as people from further regions. In time, the chapel began to fall apart, but in the middle of the 1990s, the building was restored. The chapel was re-opened on 18 August 1996. The instigator for the re-opening and renovation was Vassili Lillepuu, other men from the village (Mati Kõivik, Raivo Uiboleht, Mihkel Uiboleht, Nikolai Lillepuu, Voldemar Sillaots) helped. In the course of the renovation, the building got a new roof construction and the gable end of the roof was replaced by pitched roof, the windows were replaced, the interior was refurbished and renewed.

== Building data ==
Küllätüvä Chapel is the largest of the Setomaa stone chapels in Estonia. It is a square one-storied stone (lime and gravel blocks hollow from the inside) building with a gable roof. The stone blocks were moulded in Irboska and brought to the site by horses. The chapel has one interior room, divided into two by a partition wall: An icon scarf room (35 m^{2}) and an altar room (12 m^{2}). Entry to the altar room is through iconostasis gates, characteristic to churches. During 1974 inventory taking, the building still had a shingle half-hipped roof that was in a very bad state at the time. Because of this, the iconostasis, icons, images and other furnishings were completely perished (Kupp 1974). The dimensions of the building from the outside are 947 (l) x 580 (w) cm, height from the ground up to the ridge is 590 cm and the height of the wall is 260 cm. The size of the altar room is 370 x 530 cm.

== Furnishing ==
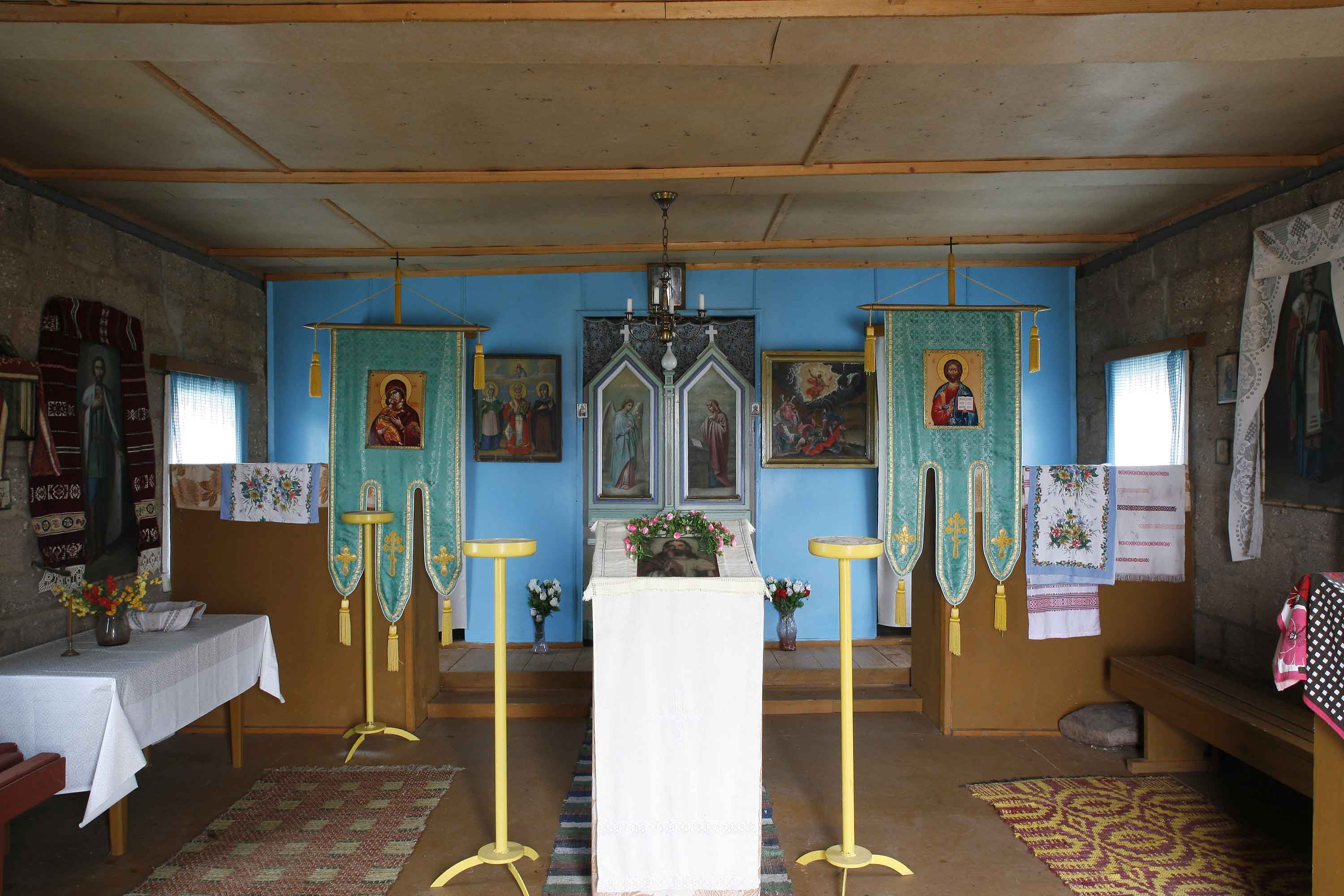
Interior view of Küllätüvä Chapel in 2008

There are about ten icons, most of them covered by icon scarves (knitted and hand-painted). In addition, a few analois and flags used for decorative purposes as well as during processes led by cross are in the chapel. A small oil lamp hangs from the ceiling. In addition to ecclesiastic furnishings, there are tables and benches-chairs, used for village gatherings on Nahtsipäev as well as on other village holidays. Some medieval stone cross pieces from a village cemetery on Küllätüvä village lands have been brought into hiding inside the chapel. A small round metal stove lies in the north-west of the building that is wood-burning and has the chimney brought out through the wall.
