= Uusvada ludimägi =

Sacred place in Setomaa, Estonia

Coordinates: 57°46′4.35″N 27°28′42″E

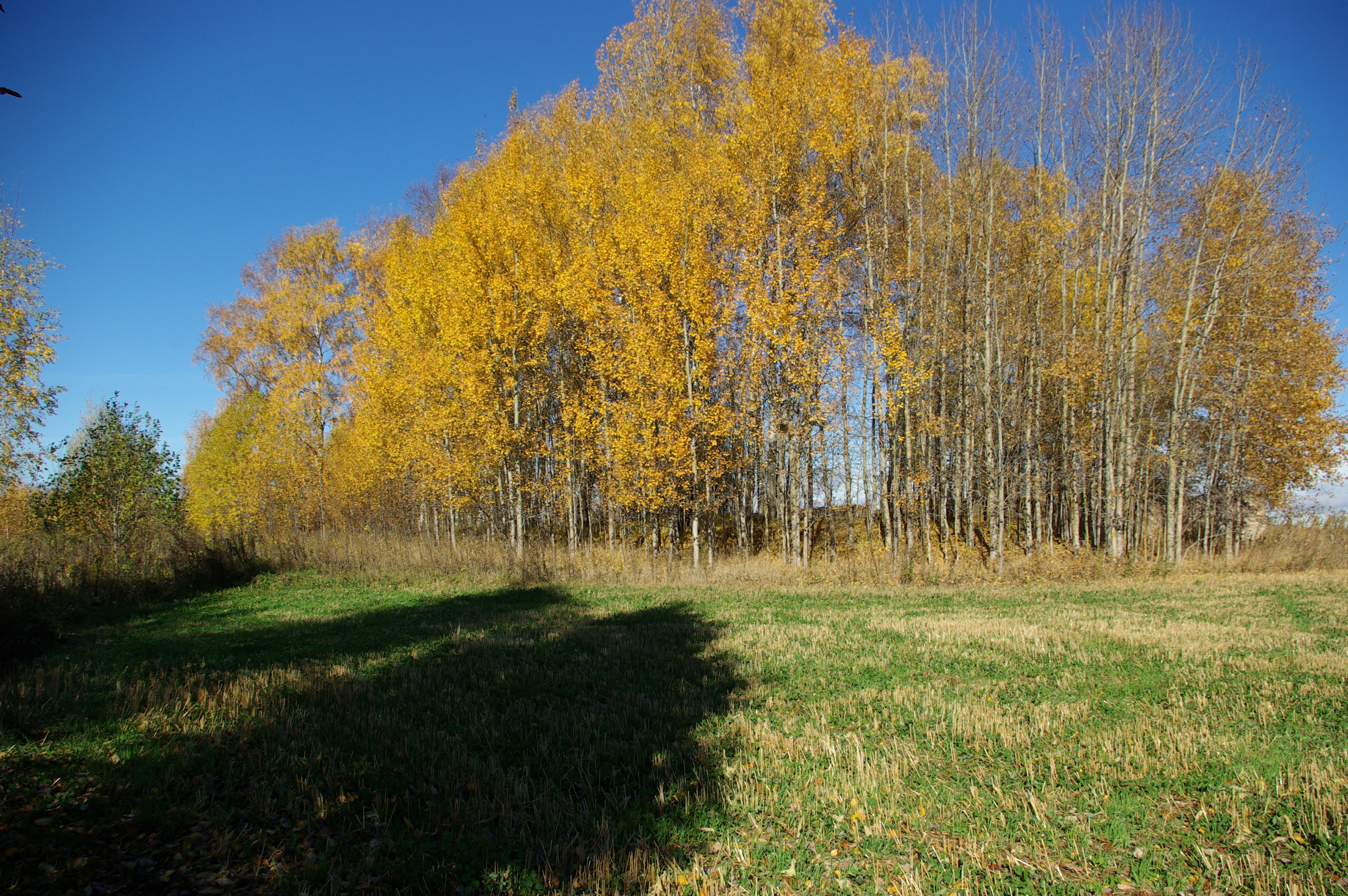
Uusvada ludimägi

Uusvada ludimägi is a sacred place in Setomaa Parish, Uusvada village. Next to Ludimägi is an ancient human settlement place that is under protection as archaeological monument no. 13598. This sacred place is one of three sacred places in Uusvada village. Ludimägi was a gathering place for the village people on holidays: Midsummer Day and Kolbripäev (Walpurgis Night). On holidays, bonfires were set up on Ludimägi. During Soviet times, a kolkhoz cellar was built on Uusvada ludimägi from dolomite, which was later used as a horse stable. However, the cellar has collapsed and all that is left are limestone cellar walls. Uusvada ludimägi is a private property, in Ludimägi estate. Ludimägi is 100 metres off from the parish road, there is no access road to Ludimägi and it can only be accessed on foot.
