= Asbestos cement =

Building material containing asbestos

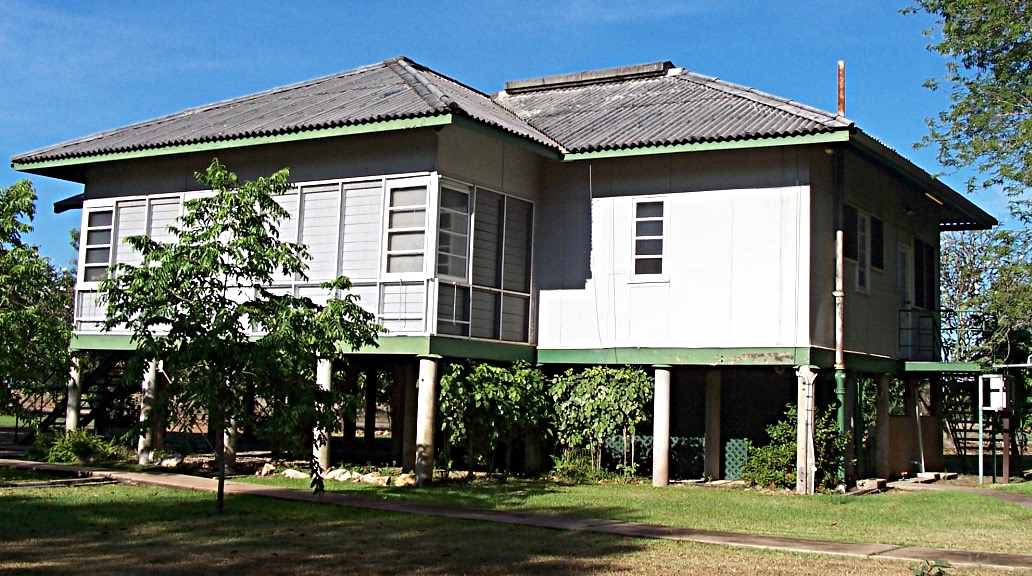
A pre World War II house in Darwin, Australia. The roof is sheeted with corrugated fibro sheets and the walls with flat fibro sheeting, with fibro battens covering the joints.

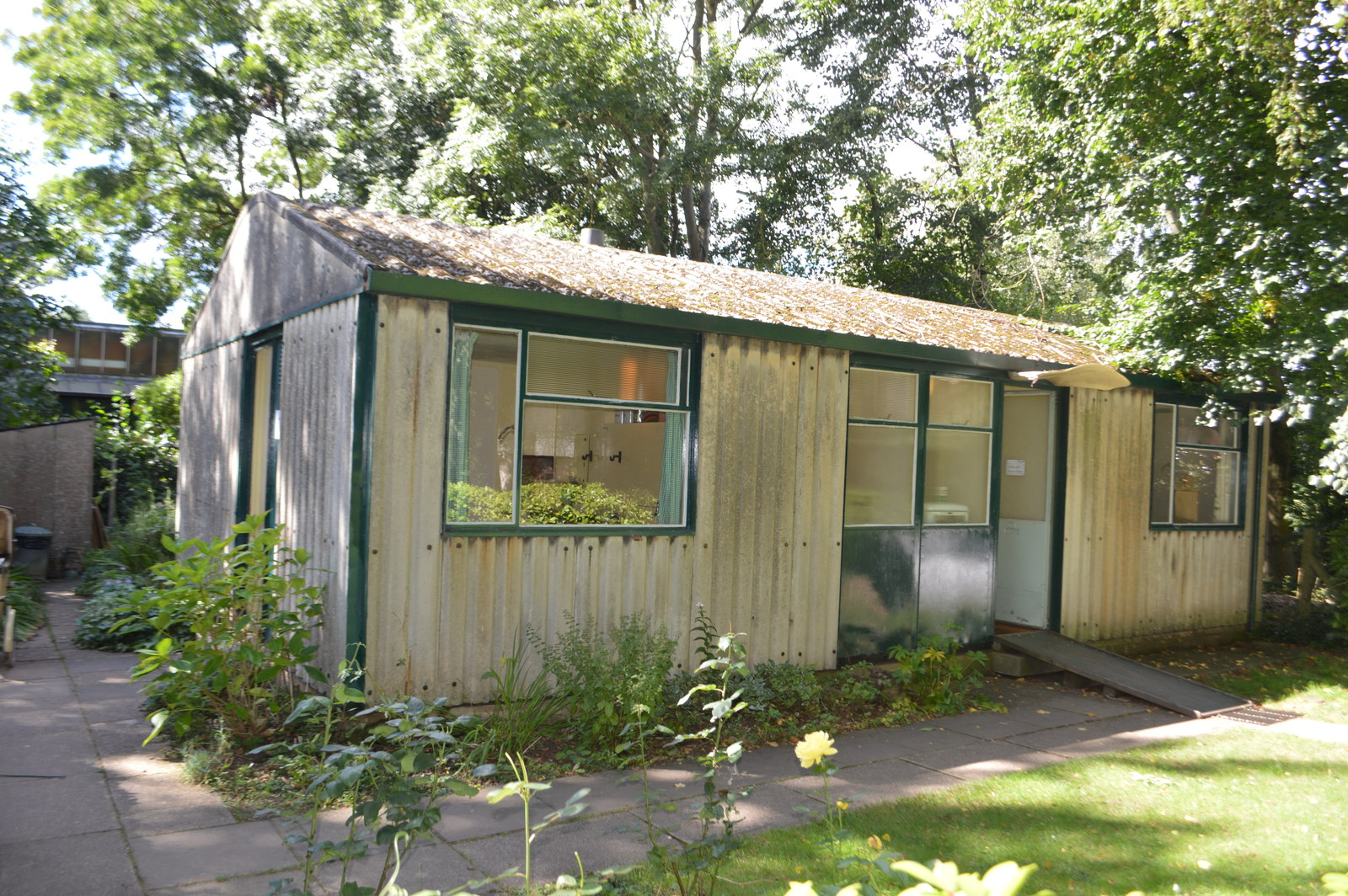
Example of asbestos cement siding and lining on a post-war temporary house at Avoncroft Museum of Historic Buildings. Nearly 40,000 of these structures were built between 1946 and 1949 to house families.

Asbestos cement, genericized as fibro, fibrolite (short for "fibrous (or fibre) cement sheet", but different from the natural mineral fibrolite), or AC sheet, is a composite building material consisting of cement and asbestos fibres pressed into thin rigid sheets and other shapes.

Invented at the end of the 19th century, the material was adopted extensively during World War II to make easily-built, sturdy and inexpensive structures for military purposes. It continued to be used widely following the war as an affordable external cladding for buildings. Advertised as a fireproof alternative to other roofing materials such as asphalt, asbestos-cement roofs were popular, not only for fire safety but also for affordability. Due to asbestos cement's imitation of more expensive materials such as wood siding and shingles, brick, slate, and stone, the product was marketed as an affordable renovation material. Asbestos cement competed with galvanised steel, available in large quantities after WWII, and the reemergence of wood clapboard and vinyl siding in the mid to late 20th century.

Asbestos cement is usually formed into flat or corrugated sheets or into pipes, but can be molded into any shape that can be formed using wet cement. In Europe, cement sheets came in a wide variety of shapes, while there was less variation in the US, due to labor and production costs. Although fibro was used in a number of countries, its use was most widespread in Australia and New Zealand. Predominantly manufactured and sold by James Hardie until the mid-1980s, fibro in all its forms was a popular building material, largely due to its durability, though the material becomes brittle and friable with age and weathering. The reinforcing fibres used in the product were almost always asbestos.

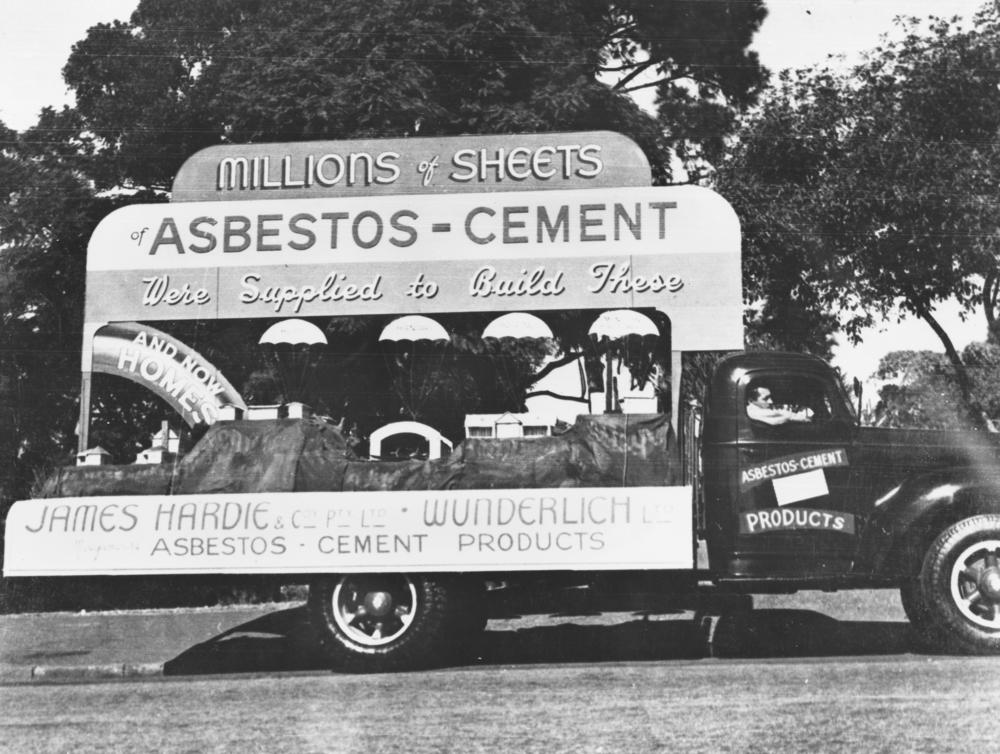
James Hardie and Wunderlich float ready for the Victory Day procession in Brisbane, 1946

The use of fibro that contains asbestos has been banned in several countries, including Australia, but as recently as 2016, the material was discovered in new components sold for construction projects.

== Health effects ==
When exposed to weathering and erosion, particularly when used on roofs, the surface deterioration of asbestos cement can release toxic airborne fibres. Exposure to asbestos causes or increases the risk of several life-threatening diseases, including asbestosis, pleural mesothelioma (lung), and peritoneal mesothelioma (abdomen).

Safer asbestos-free fibre cement sheet is still readily available, but the reinforcing fibres are cellulose. The name "fibro" is still traditionally applied to fibre cement.

== Products used in the building industry ==
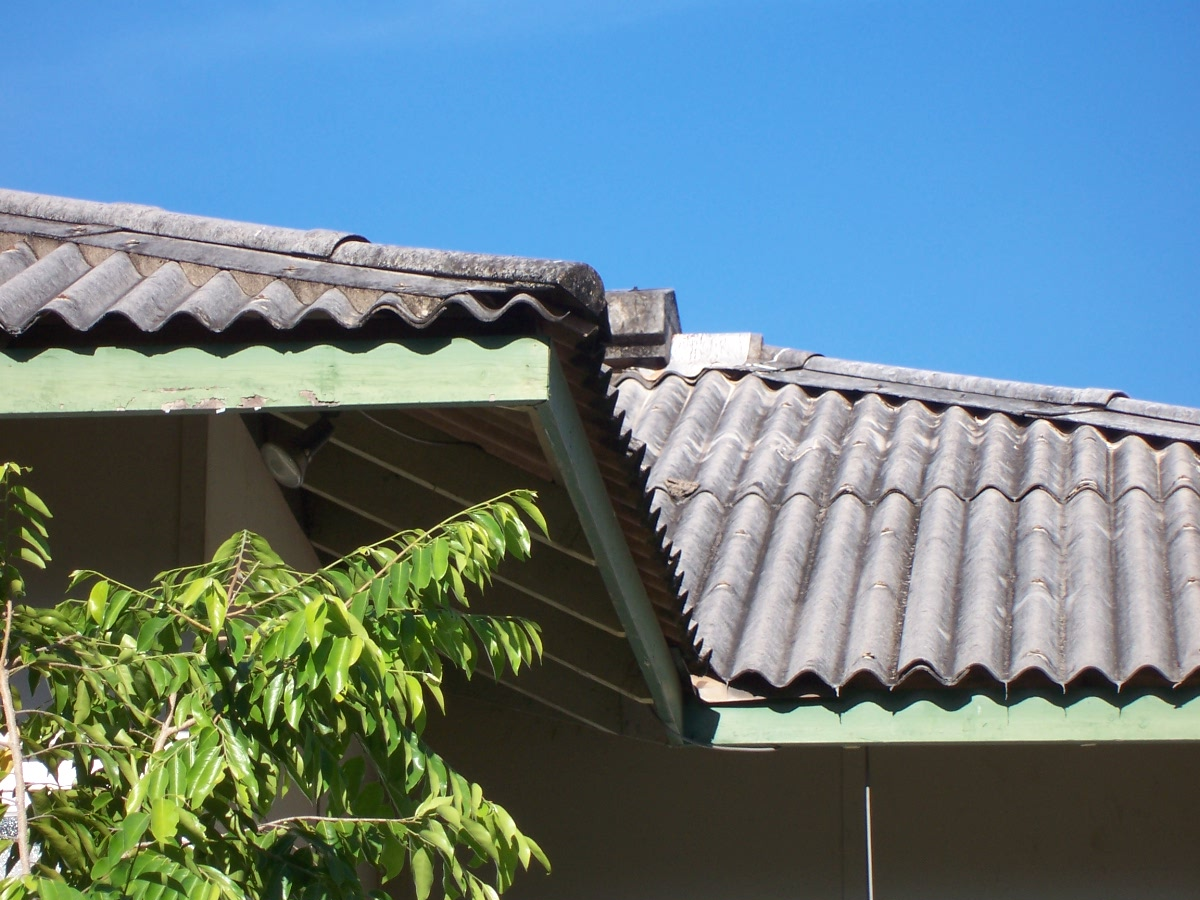
Roof sheeting, known as Hardies "Super Six"

- Roofs - most usually on industrial or farmyard buildings and domestic garages.
- Flat sheets for house walls and ceilings were usually 6 and 4.5 mm (0.24 and 0.18 in) thick, 900 and 1,200 mm (35 and 47 in) wide, and from 1,800 to 3,000 mm (71 to 118 in) long.
- Battens 50 mm (2.0 in) wide × 8 mm (0.31 in) thick, used to cover the joints in fibro sheets.
- "Super Six" corrugated roof sheeting and fencing.
- Internal wet area sheeting, "Tilux".
- Pipes of various sizes for water reticulation and drainage. Drainage pipes tend to be made of pitch fibre, with asbestos cement added to strengthen.
- Moulded products ranging from plant pots to outdoor telephone cabinet roofs and cable pits.

== Cleaning of asbestos cement ==
Some Australian states, such as Queensland, prohibit the cleaning of fibro with pressure washers, because it can spread the embedded asbestos fibres over a wide area. Safer cleaning methods involve using a fungicide and a sealant.

== In popular culture ==
The 1973 song, "Way Out West", by The Dingoes, later covered by James Blundell & James Reyne, mentions living in a "house made of fibro cement". Fibro is also referred to several times on the Australian TV show Housos.

== See also ==
- Cemesto
- Eternit
- Fibre cement
- Transite, a brand of fibre cement originally produced as asbestos cement
