= Tobrova Chapel =

Chapel in Tobrova village, Estonia

- Tobrova tsässon
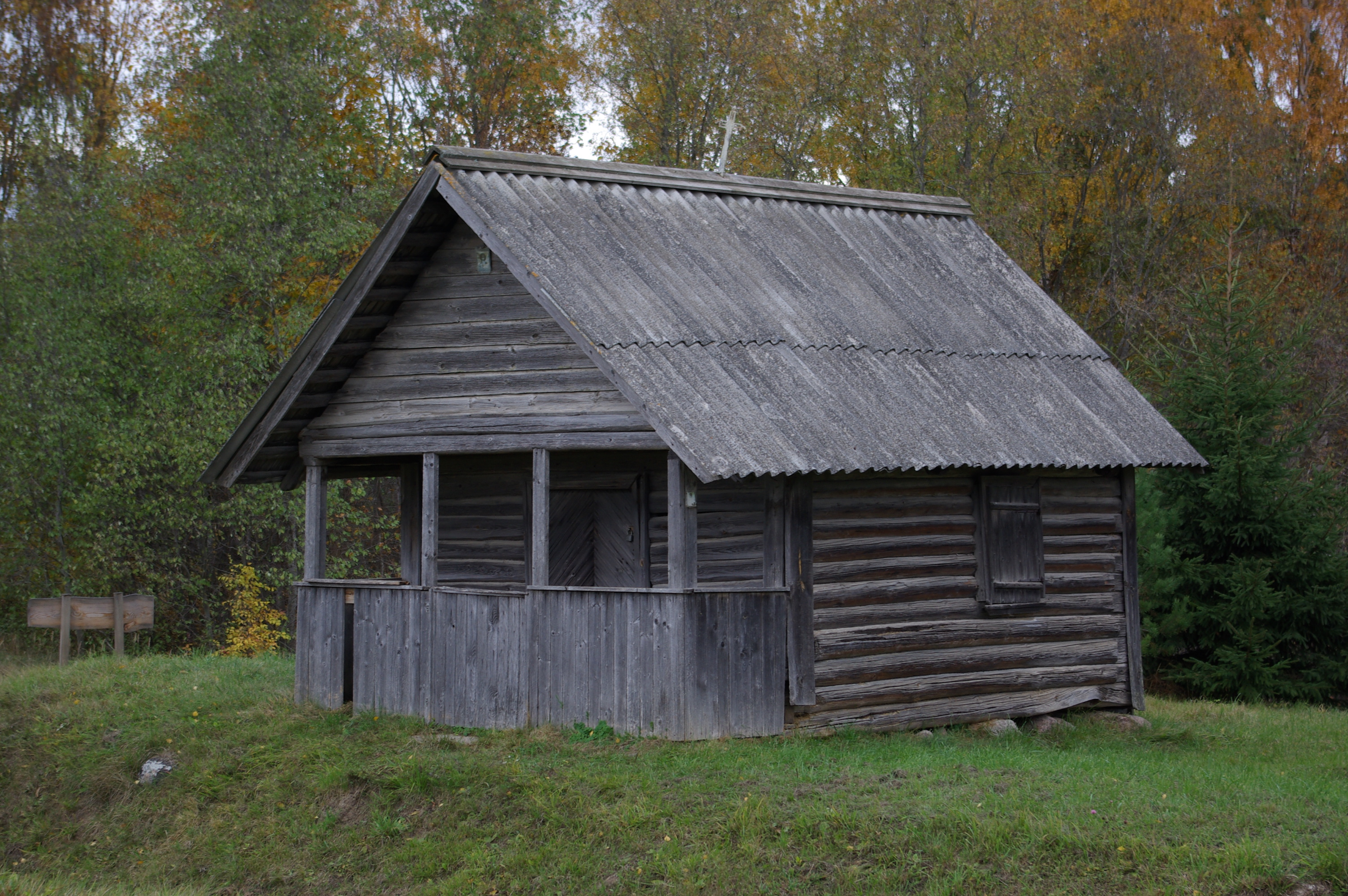

Religion
- Affiliation: Estonian Apostolic Orthodox Church
- Year consecrated: 1930

Location
- Location: Tobrova, Setomaa Parish, Estonia
- Interactive map of Tobrova Chapel
- Coordinates: 57°46′12.28″N 27°27′42.35″E

Architecture
- Materials: wood

Tobrova Chapel (Estonian: Tobrova tsässon) is a small Seto chapel in the village of Tobrova, Setomaa Parish, Võru County in southeastern Estonia.

== General information ==
Tobrova Chapel is located in the village of Tobrova on Koplioja land unit (near Luikjärve farm buildings) along the road from Tobrova to Helbi. The feast for this chapel is Passover (Estonian: lihavõõdõh), a movable feast. The chapel is rarely used, and in recent years it has mostly been exhibited to visitors. The building is not state protected. It is in good condition.

== Building data ==
Tobrova Chapel is a small fir wood cross-beam building that has a square floor plan; it is connected by fishtail tenons in the corner. Corner tenons are axe-hewn; the walls of the building have also been hewn from the inside. Some of the wall beams have been replaced by newer ones: the lower log row in the entire building, two lower beams on the north-east side and two lower beams on the northern corner. The wall beams of the building in the corners and in the middle of the wall are standing on granite stones. The dimensions of the chapel are 508 x 332 cm; the building has one interior room (12.3 m2) and an outer shelter of 2.3 m2. The entrance-room has square beam posts and a vertical boarding barrier. The supporting posts and barrier of the entrance-room has been replaced a few decades ago; a bit earlier, wider, sawn, vertical boards fixed side-by-side were used at the lower part of the barrier. Back then, the posts were axe-hewn square beams. The ceiling of the chapel is finished by wide boarding, hammered to the rafters and forming a roof-ceiling. There are no ceiling-beams. The building stands on granite stones. The height of the wall from the ground up to where the rafters are attached is 188 cm and the height up to the ridge is 366 cm. The photos of 1974 and 1980 show that the building had a shingle roof that was in good condition, and now has eternit sheets on top of it. The ridge has a simple forged cross on it. A faded entry icon is under the eaves. The floor is made from hand hewn and dressed boards. The building has a door (92 x 146 cm) made from boards fixed on the crosspiece and attached on the hewn tender posts. Forged hinges with tips resembling bird heads are on the door. From the inside, the door does not have a finishing; sheeting with fishtail fluting is hammered on the outside. There is an alms box outside next to the door. The eastern side of the building has a wooden window with a single frame and three panes. The window with a trapdoor opens on the inside. The building has been inventoried during 1974. Fr. Dr. Fr. R. Kreutzwald Memorial Museum expedition. A photo was taken of the chapel and icons and an inventory record was drawn up where the structure of the building and the icons were described. Tobrova Chapel is said to be one of the best preserved chapels in Meremäe rural municipality on the inventory record (Kupp 1974). The outer look of the chapel has not changed much compared to 1974.

== Furnishing ==
A narrow icon table (shelf) with the front edge decorated by a gearwheel pattern is located in the rear wall inside Tobrova Chapel. The icon table has simple tin candlesticks on it, made for thin church candles. There are icons on the shelf as well as on the rear wall. The side walls of the building have tea towels hung on them. Three wooden candlesticks in the chapel are also quite remarkable. There is a table with a tea-cloth on it in front of the icon shelf that has a basket with Easter eggs on it, as well as a vase with artificial flowers and small Seto and Estonian flags.

== Lore and historic information ==
Festive Seto village parties (kirmas) were held in Tobrova during Easter (Sillaots 2001). Services were held in Tobrova on the first Easter Day at 10 or 13, with a sermon and a small water consecration (Sillaots 2004).
