= Ludwig Hatschek =

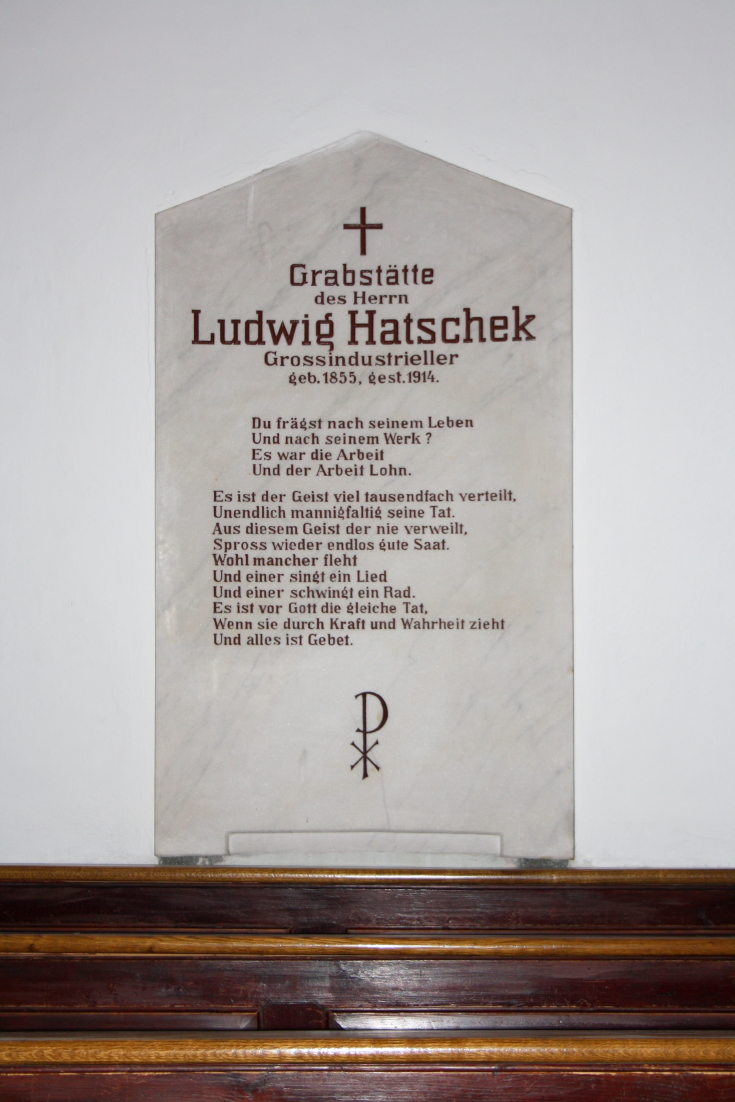
Grave of Ludwig Hatschek at Wallfahrtskirche Maria Schöndorf, Vöcklabruck

Ludwig Hatschek (9 October 1855 – 15 July 1914) was an Austrian industrialist. He was the founder of the Eternit-Werke factory in Vöcklabruck, Upper Austria.

== Biography ==
Ludwig Hatschek was born on 9 October 1855 in Těšetice, as the sixth child in a brewing family. In 1866, the Hatschek family moved from Moravia to Linz. Ludwig Hatschek attended business school here and then graduated from a brewing school in Weihenstephan near Munich. He later worked at the brewery Linzer Aktienbrauerei und Malzfabrik (one of the predecessors of the current largest Austrian beer producer, the Brau Union group), owned by his father, and travelled extensively. He left his father's company in 1890; he was paid his share of 100,000 guilders. While he was looking for a new area of activity in Great Britain, his wife, the daughter of a banker, Rosa Würzburger, was looking for a suitable location in Upper Austria. In 1893 he bought a disused paper mill in Schöndorf near Vöcklabruck. He bought used asbestos spinning machines for it from a burnt-out spinning mill in Gastein- Lend near Salzburg. Asbestos was a "new" material at the time and piqued Hatschek's interest. A year later he founded the company Erste Österreich-ungarische Asbestwarenfabrik Ludwig Hatschek.

Ludwig Hatschek worked for seven years on the development of a fire-resistant roofing material, lighter than burnt roof tiles, cheaper than slate and more durable than sheet metal. Having found Portland cement to be the right binder, he succeeded in making non-flammable, frost-resistant and lightweight boards for durable roofing. He mixed 90% cement and 10% asbestos fibers with water and processed the mixture on a cardboard machine. In 1900, he patented this production process; the patent was entitled "Production of artificial stone slabs with hydraulic binders". In 1903 he gave the new product the trade name "Eternit" (Latin aeternus – eternal). Later, pipes also began to be made from asbestos cement. For the first time, asbestos cement was used on a large scale during the construction of the Taur Railway (1902–1909), where it proved itself. From 1908, his company imported the necessary cement from the cement factory in Pinsdorf, which Hatschek built for this purpose. Hatschek secured the second raw material - asbestos - in Russia, where he obtained a five-year contract from the owners of mines in the Ural Mountains for the exclusive purchase of the entire annual production.

Due to the difficulties in obtaining patents abroad (especially in Germany, where the process took almost 10 years), Hatschek did not establish other factories of his own (with the exception of the one in the village of Nyergesújfalu near Esztergom in Hungary, which was given tax advantages), but was satisfied with the income from royalties and production licenses that he sold worldwide. By 1910, within ten years of the patent being registered, "Eternit" factories had been established in many countries, including France, Switzerland, Germany, Belgium, Netherlands, Portugal, Italy, Great Britain, Sweden, Denmark, Romania, Russia, United States and Canada. In the Austro-Hungarian Monarchy alone, 300 to 400 companies sold Eternity. Railway station buildings continued to be major government contracts. Thanks to this expansion, Hatschek moved the company headquarters to Linz in 1910–1911, where he also moved. He had houses built for his workers in Vöcklabruck. Between 1910 and 1913, Ludwig Hatschek transformed the former sand pit on the Bauernberg in Linz into a large park at great expense and donated it to the city.

From 1910 his life was marked by serious illness. He completed numerous medical stays abroad – in Nice, Merano, and in a sanatorium near Munich. He died in July 1914 in his Art Nouveau villa Hatschek (currently the seat of the Upper Austrian Chamber of Agriculture – Oö. Landwirtschaftskammer) in Linz.

In 1908, Ludwig Hatschek received the honorary title of "Imperial Councilor" (Kaiserlicher Rat). In 1914 he was named an honorary citizen of Linz, and in 1945 a street was named after him – Hatschekstraße. A street named after him can also be found in the nearby towns of Wels, Gmunden, and in the municipality of Seewalchen am Attersee. In 1953, Hatschekgasse in Vienna – Donaustadt (22nd district) was named after him.
