= Serga Chapel =

Chapel in Setomaa, Estonia

- Serga tsässon
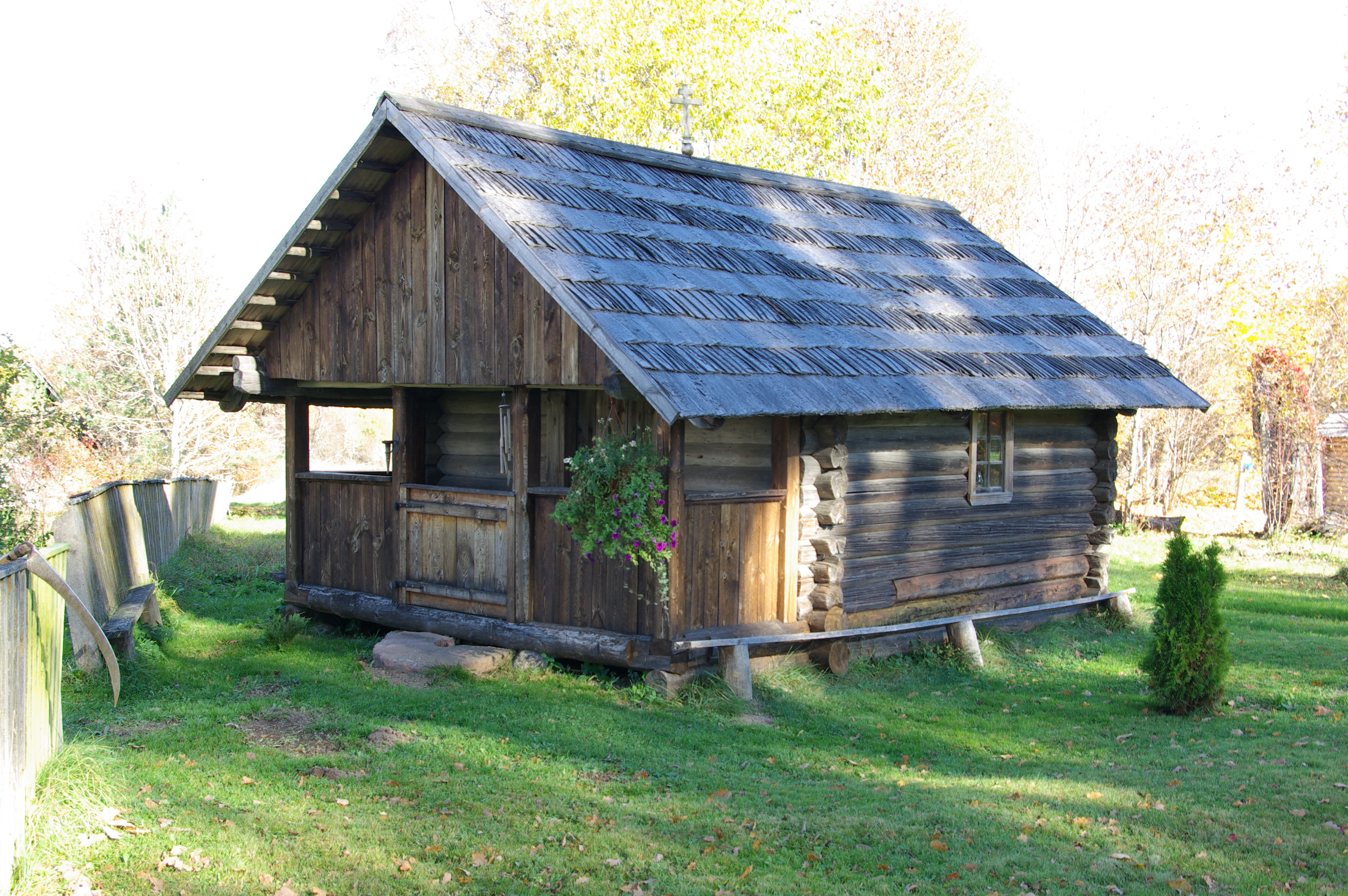

Religion
- Affiliation: Estonian Apostolic Orthodox Church
- Year consecrated: 1784

Location
- Location: Serga, Setomaa Parish, Estonia
- Interactive map of Serga Chapel
- Coordinates: 57°45′13.8″N 27°28′37.2″E

Architecture
- Materials: wood

Serga Chapel (Estonian: Serga tsässon) is a small Seto chapel in the village of Serga, Setomaa Parish, Võru County in southeastern Estonia.

== General information ==
Serga Chapel is situated in the middle of the Serga village. The vicinity of the chapel is used as a village square and has a swing, a flag post and some benches. Serga Chapel is dedicated to Saint Anastasia and the feast for this chapel is on the 11 November (Nahtsipäev) (29 October according to Julian calendar). The chapel is still used today. According to the data based on dendrochronological research, the probable time of building is 1784 (Läänelaid et al 2005). The building is not state-protected. It is in good condition. The chapel was hit by a shrapnel shell during a battle in the War of Independence that shifted it off the stone foundation. Splinters and the damage they did can be seen today in the east and north wall of the building. During Nahtsipäev (11 November) in 2007, father Rafael re-inaugurated Serga Chapel after a thorough renovation. Local builders Ain Raal and Väino Järv replaced the lower beams, the floors, the ceilings and installed a new aspen shingle roof during the renovation. Serga Chapel was near to the new Taeluva Church; therefore, the communication between the villagers and popes was frequent. The chapel was actively used during Soviet times (Sillaots 2001).

== Building data ==
Serga Chapel is a small, square one-storied pinewood cross-beam building with a gable roof; the dimensions of it are 565 x 438 cm. The building has one interior room (14.1 m2) and an outer shelter of 4.8 m2. The shelter is a construction supporting on six wooden posts, with a meter-high barrier made from vertical boards, the front edge has a gate about the same height. The building has walls made from round unhewn pine logs in the inside as well as on the outside, the height from the foundation up to where the wall and rafter are joined is 197 cm and up to the ridge 380 cm. The logs are tied in the corners by axe hewn backwards halving, that is typical for older log constructions in the region. The upper beams on the side walls are also quite remarkable, as the edges that extend over the wall are profiled by an axe. The building is standing on granite stones. For about 90 years, the building was off the stones and the lower logs were rotting. In 2007, it was raised on the stones again and the rotten logs were replaced by new ones. Half-beams that are axe-hewn on the top have been placed on the floor and rest on the slots in the front wall. The roof used to support on raising-plates and probably had a board-roof. By now all that is left is a raising-plate on the ridge and holes for former raising-plates in the head walls. The building has three pairs of rafters with roof boarding suitable for shingle roof fitted on it. A threefold aspen shingle-roof was installed on the chapel during 2007 renovation. The door of the building (160 x 86 cm) is fixed on the hewn tender posts by forged hinges that are shaped like bird heads. The leaf of the door is made from boards fixed on the crosspiece and it opens on the inside. There is an old-time metal padlock, hasp and a clamp fixed on the door as well as an old-time forged handle with a ring. A millstone is used for a doorsill. There is a window with six panes in the eastern wall (45 x 64 cm). Signs of the place where a former cauldron hole (50 (w) x 30 (h) cm) can be seen next to the window.
