= Uusvada =

Village in Estonia

- Village
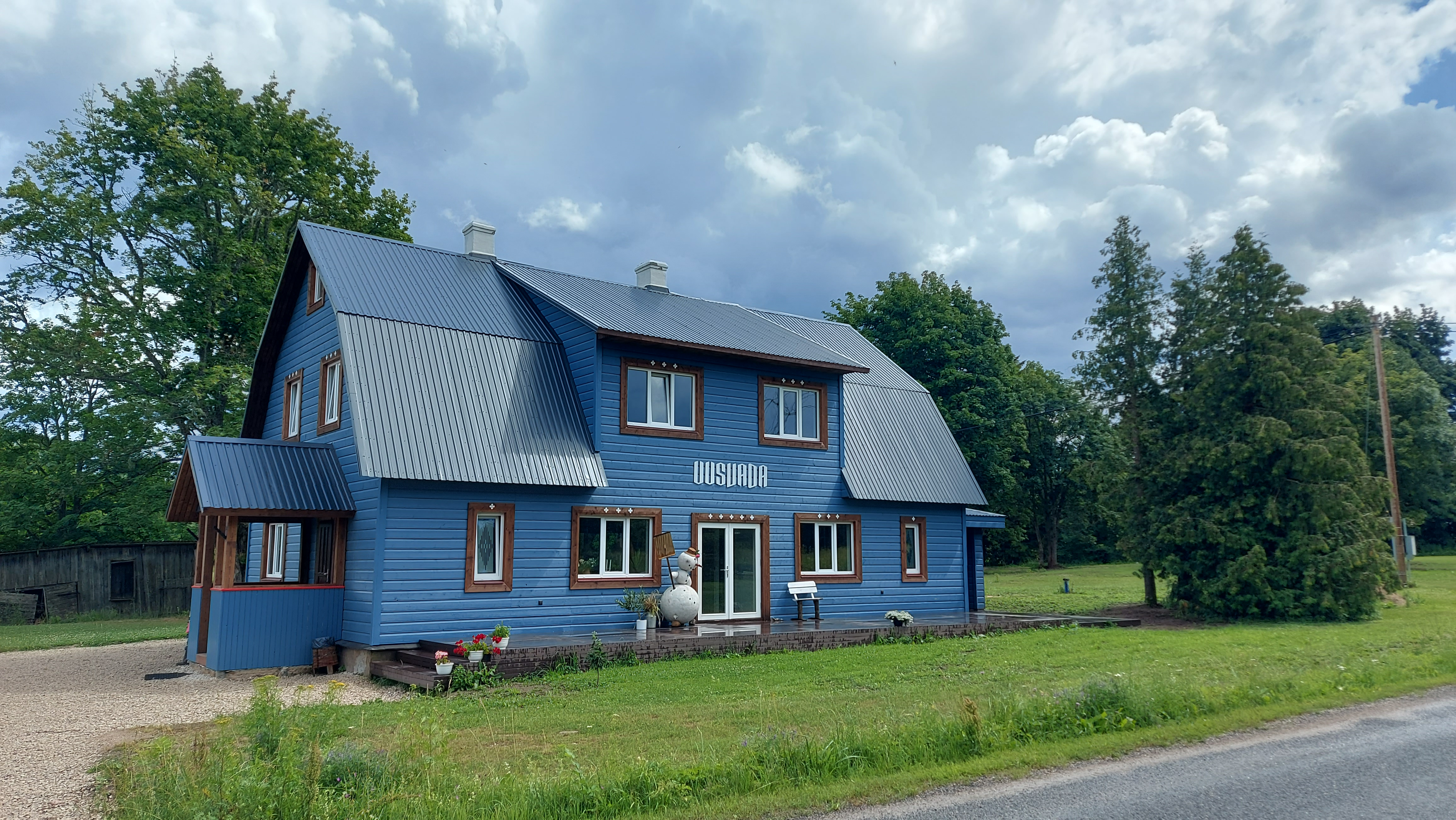
- Village House in Uusvada

- Location within Estonia
- Coordinates: 57.769722222222°N 27.484166666667°E
- Country: Estonia
- County: Võru County
- Parish: Setomaa Parish
- Time zone: UTC+2 (EET)
  - Summer (DST): UTC+3 (EEST)

Uusvada is a village in Setomaa Parish, Võru County in Estonia.

Uusvada Chapel, a Seto chapel, is located in the village.

== See also ==
- Uusvada ludimägi
