= Küllätüvä =

Village in Estonia

- Village
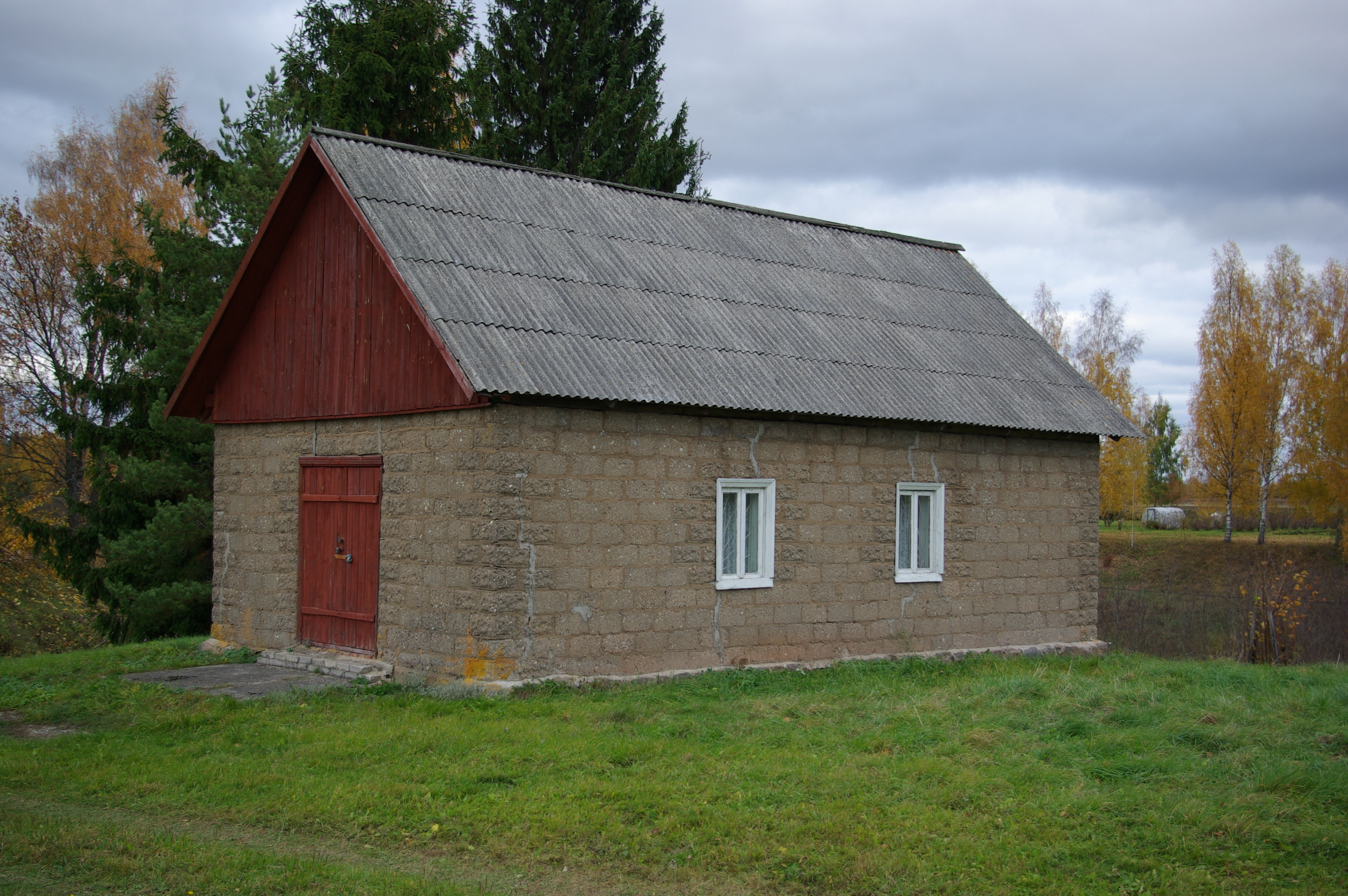
- Orthodox chapel in Küllätüvä

- Location within Estonia
- Coordinates: 57.791944444444°N 27.471111111111°E
- Country: Estonia
- County: Võru County
- Parish: Setomaa Parish
- Time zone: UTC+2 (EET)
  - Summer (DST): UTC+3 (EEST)

Küllätüvä is a village in Setomaa Parish, Võru County in Estonia.

== Name ==
Küllätüvä was attested in historical sources as Телятина (Telyatina) c. 1790, Кюлитина (Kyulitina) c. 1866, Тюлитино (Tyulitino) in 1872, Külätowa in 1885, Küllätüwwä in 1886, and Külätawa in 1897, among other variations of the name. The origin of the name is uncertain. One possibility is derivation from a personal name. The word küll 'abundance' is known in Estonian dialects, and the linguist Mariko Faster hypothesizes that the village name goes back to an ancient Finno-Ugric personal name and a village name derived from it, with the original form reconstructed as *kültätvä 'praised, praiseworthy'. The linguist Villem Ernits suggested that analogous names originate from the ancient Finnic-Ugric personal name *Külline 'abundant, rich'. A second possibility involves the sound change t- > k-; the linguist Lembit Vaba draws attention to the opposite sound change, k > t, in central Latvian, and also observes that this change is found in central Russian dialects. Accordingly, the linguist Jüri Truusmann derived the name of the village from the dialect name of the green sandpiper: tillutaja, tüllitaja, or tilluti (cf. standard Estonian metstilder), which has parallels in the village names Тюлькино (Tyul′kino) in Udmurtia and Тюльчинская (Tyul′chinskaya) in Karelia.

== Cultural heritage ==
Küllätüvä Chapel, a small Seto chapel, is located in the village.
