= Tobrova =

Village in Estonia

- Village
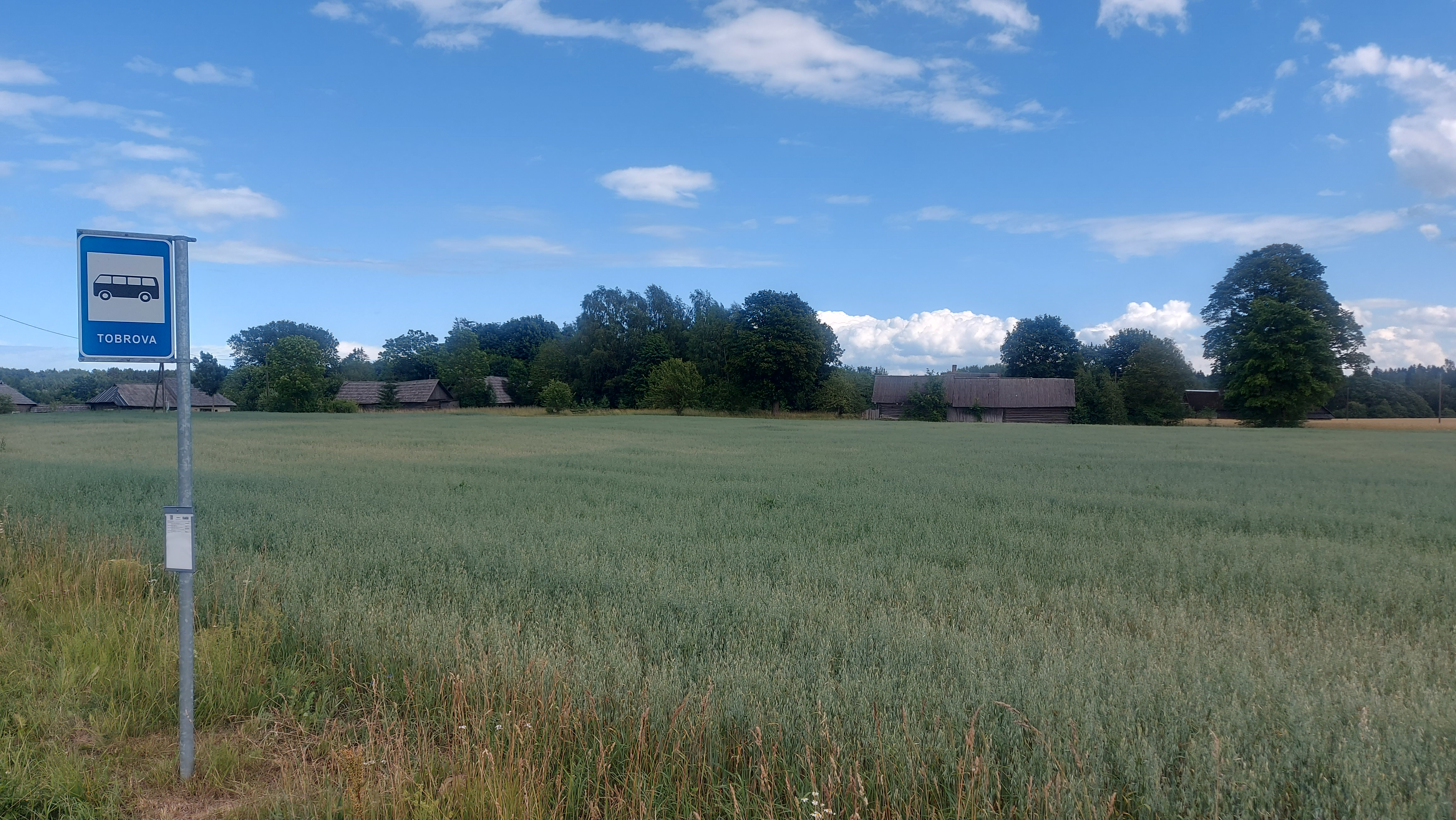
- Houses in Tobrova

- Location within Estonia
- Coordinates: 57.774722222222°N 27.461666666667°E
- Country: Estonia
- County: Võru County
- Parish: Setomaa Parish
- Time zone: UTC+2 (EET)
  - Summer (DST): UTC+3 (EEST)

Tobrova is a village in Setomaa Parish, Võru County in Estonia.

Tobrova Chapel, a Seto chapel, is located in the village.
