= Polovina, Vologda Oblast =

Polovina Половина
- Village
- Location within Vologda Oblast Location within Russia
- Coordinates: 59°46′N 44°55′E
- Country: Russia
- Region: Vologda Oblast
- District: Nikolsky District
- Time zone: UTC+3:00

Polovina (Russian: Половина) is a rural locality (a village) in Vakhnevskoye Rural Settlement, Nikolsky District, Vologda Oblast, Russia. The population was 38 as of 2002.

== Geography ==
Polovina is located 52 km northwest of Nikolsk (the district's administrative centre) by road. Orlovo is the nearest rural locality.
