= Serga, Estonia =

Village in Estonia

Serga
- Location within Estonia
- Coordinates: 57°45′11″N 27°28′47″E
- Country: Estonia
- County: Võru County
- Time zone: UTC+2 (EET)

Serga is a settlement in Setomaa Parish, Võru County in southeastern Estonia.

Serga Chapel, a small wooden Seto chapel, is located in the village.
