= Polovina, Estonia =

Village in Estonia

Polovina
- Village
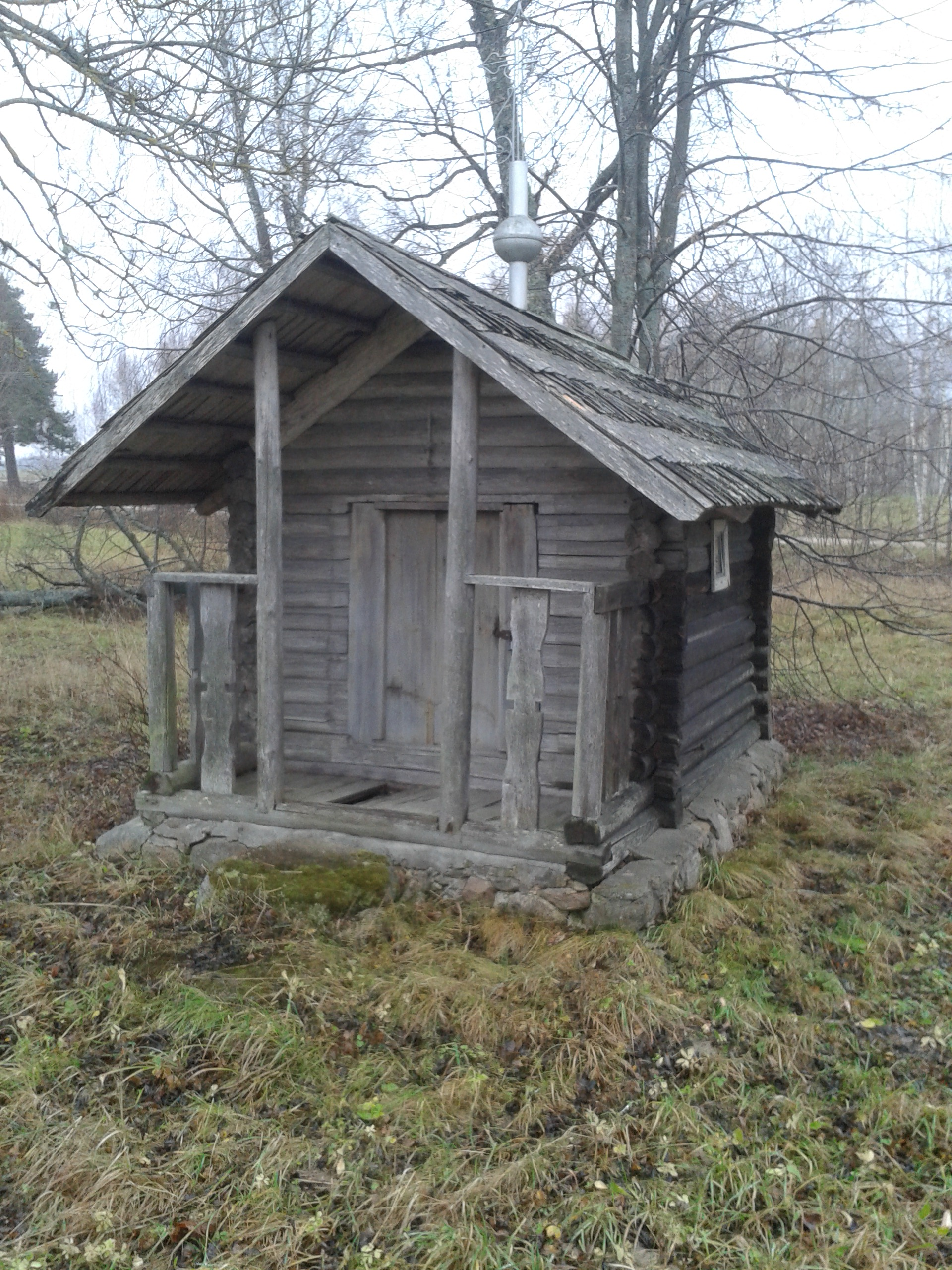
- Meldova Chapel in Polovina.

- Location in Estonia
- Coordinates: 57°48′40″N 27°30′05″E
- Country: Estonia
- County: Võru County
- Municipality: Setomaa Parish

Population (2011 Census)
  - Total: 13

Polovina (also known as Polovinna, Polovino, Bolovino, Meelma, Palu, Salu) is a village in Setomaa Parish, Võru County in southeastern Estonia.

As of the 2011 census, the settlement's population was 13.

Meldova Chapel, a small wooden Seto chapel from 1753, is located in Polovina.
