= Těšetice (Znojmo District) =

- Municipality
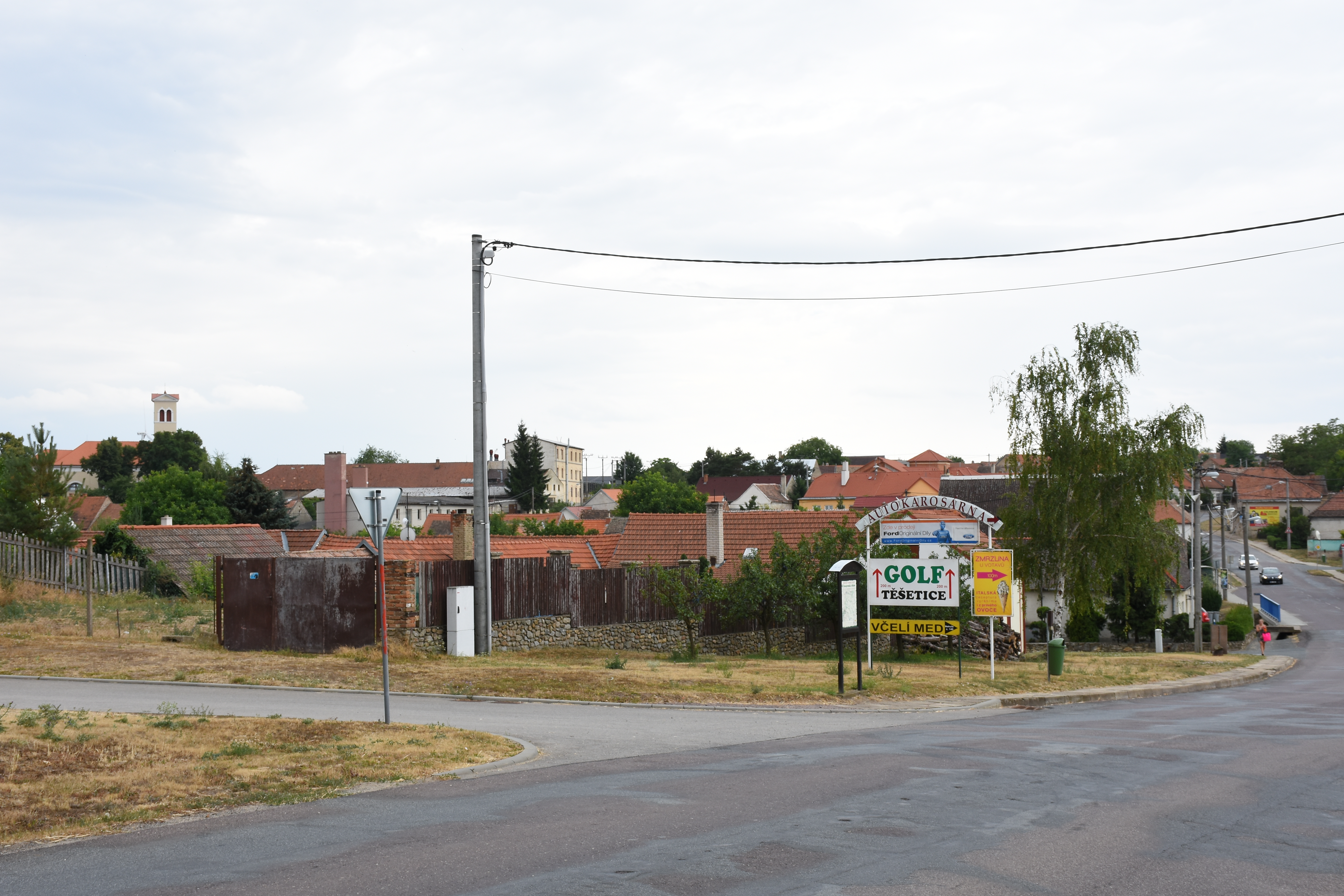
- View from the north

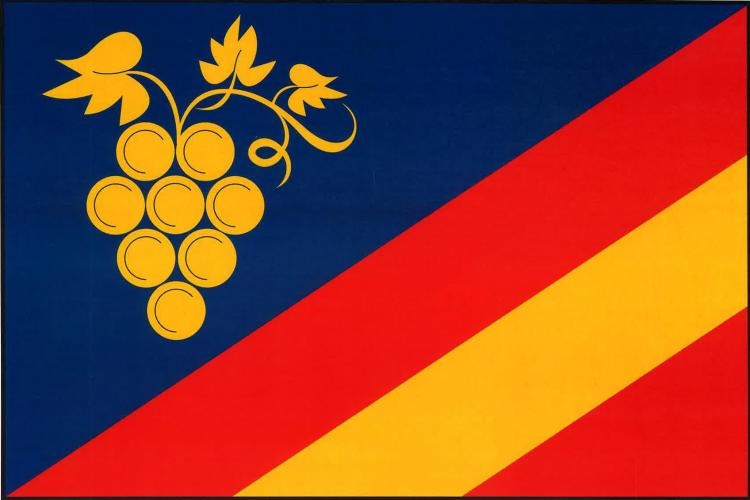
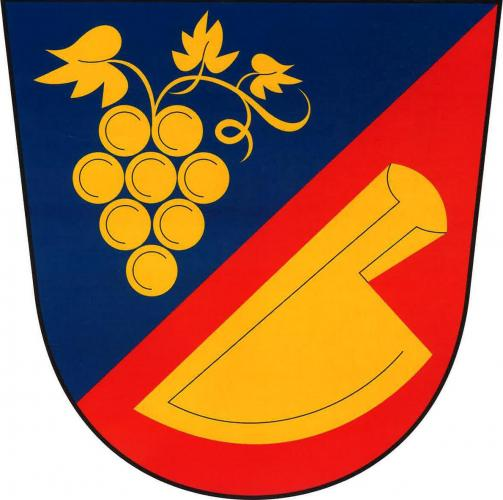
- Flag Coat of arms

- Location in the Czech Republic
- Coordinates: 48°53′20″N 16°9′20″E
- Country: Czech Republic
- Region: South Moravian
- District: Znojmo
- First mentioned: 1260

Area
  - Total: 7.27 km^{2} (2.81 sq mi)
- Elevation: 232 m (761 ft)

Population (2026-01-01)
  - Total: 639
  - Density: 87.9/km^{2} (228/sq mi)
- Time zone: UTC+1 (CET)
  - Summer (DST): UTC+2 (CEST)
- Postal code: 671 61
- Website: www.tesetice.cz

Těšetice is a municipality and village in Znojmo District in the South Moravian Region of the Czech Republic. It has about 600 inhabitants.

Těšetice lies approximately 10 kilometres (6 mi) north-east of Znojmo, 49 km (30 mi) south-west of Brno, and 184 km (114 mi) south-east of Prague.

== Demographics ==
Historical population
Year	Pop.	±%
1869	409	—
1880	447	+9.3%
1890	516	+15.4%
1900	498	−3.5%
1910	505	+1.4%
1921	557	+10.3%
1930	594	+6.6%
1950	427	−28.1%
1961	492	+15.2%
1970	520	+5.7%
1980	502	−3.5%
1991	434	−13.5%
2001	479	+10.4%
2011	524	+9.4%
2021	568	+8.4%
Source: Censuses
