= Eternit =

Type of fiber cement

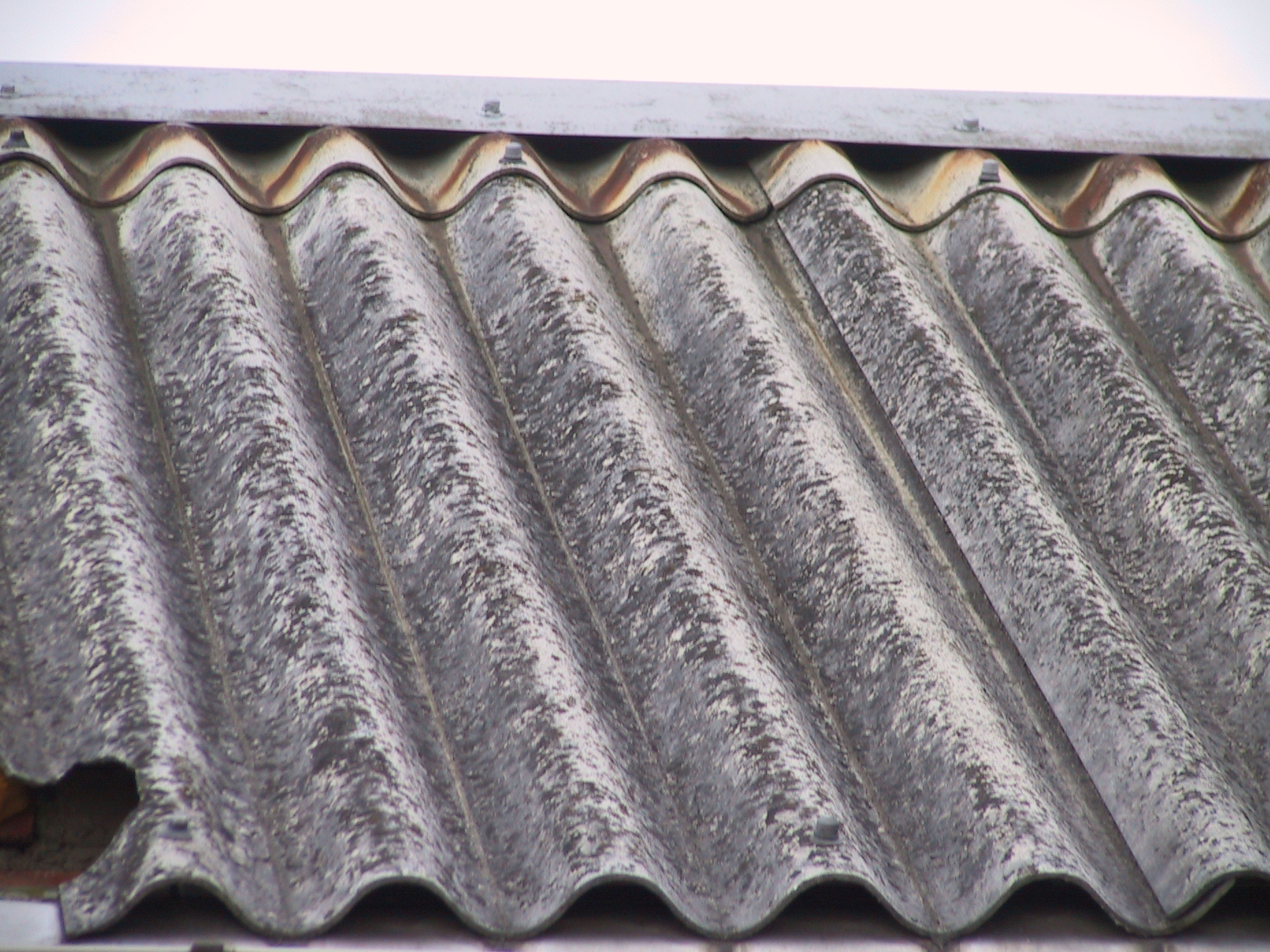
Eternit roofing.

Eternit is a registered trademark for a brand of fibre cement currently owned by the Belgian company Etex. Fibre is often applied in building and construction materials, mainly in roofing and facade products.

== Material description ==
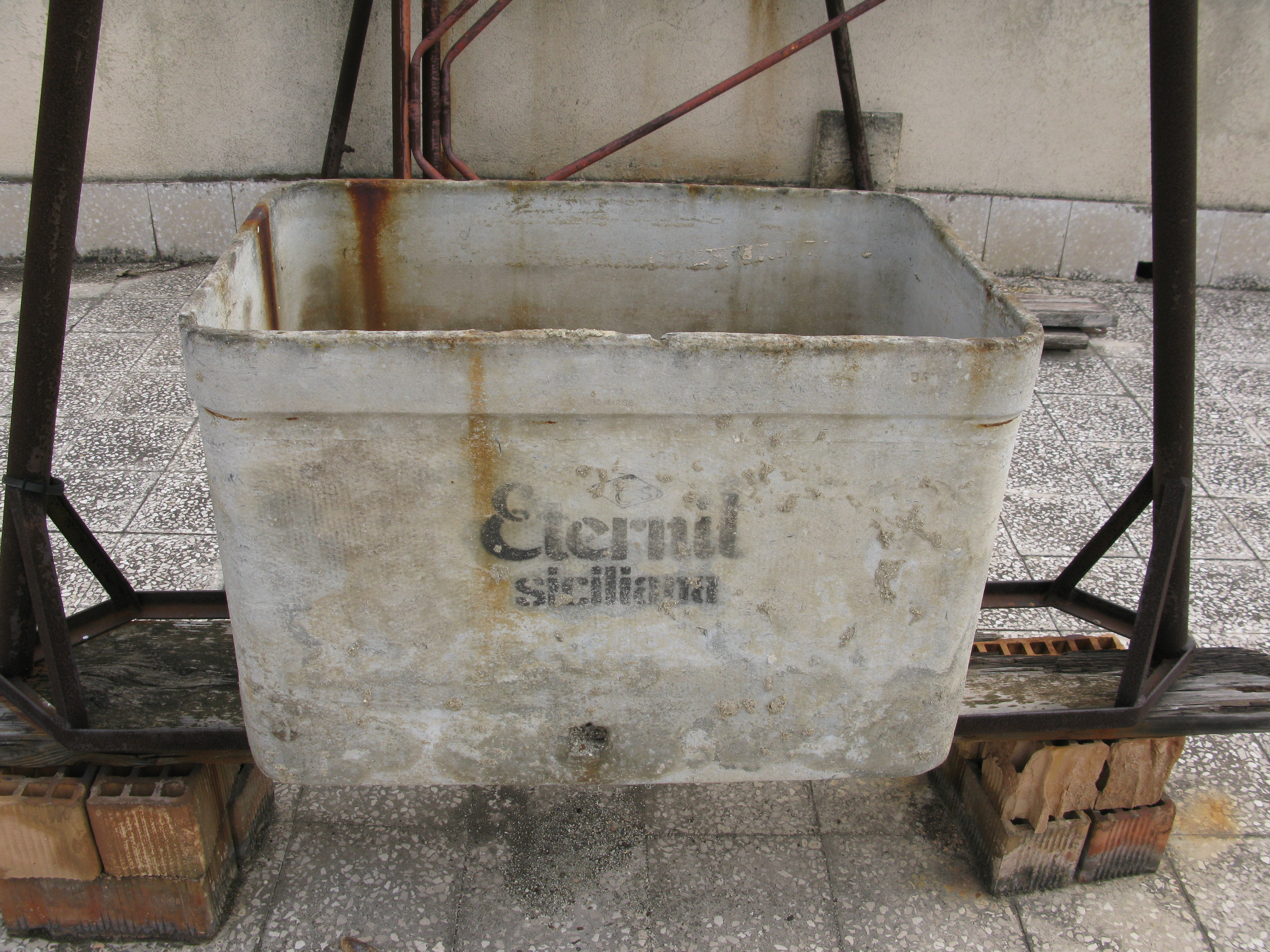
Old eternit water tank

The term "cement" originates from the Latin word "Caementum", which signifies chopped stone. Cement describes a binding substance, which will react chemically with water and develop into a material as hard as stone. In fibre cement, there is a fibre reinforcement, which contributes to making the fibre-cement material even stronger and to better withstand tension. Together with a carefully planned production process, fibre cement makes it possible to develop strong and long-lasting construction materials.

Today fibre cement is considered a material physically suited for construction products such as cladding and roofing.

== Material history ==
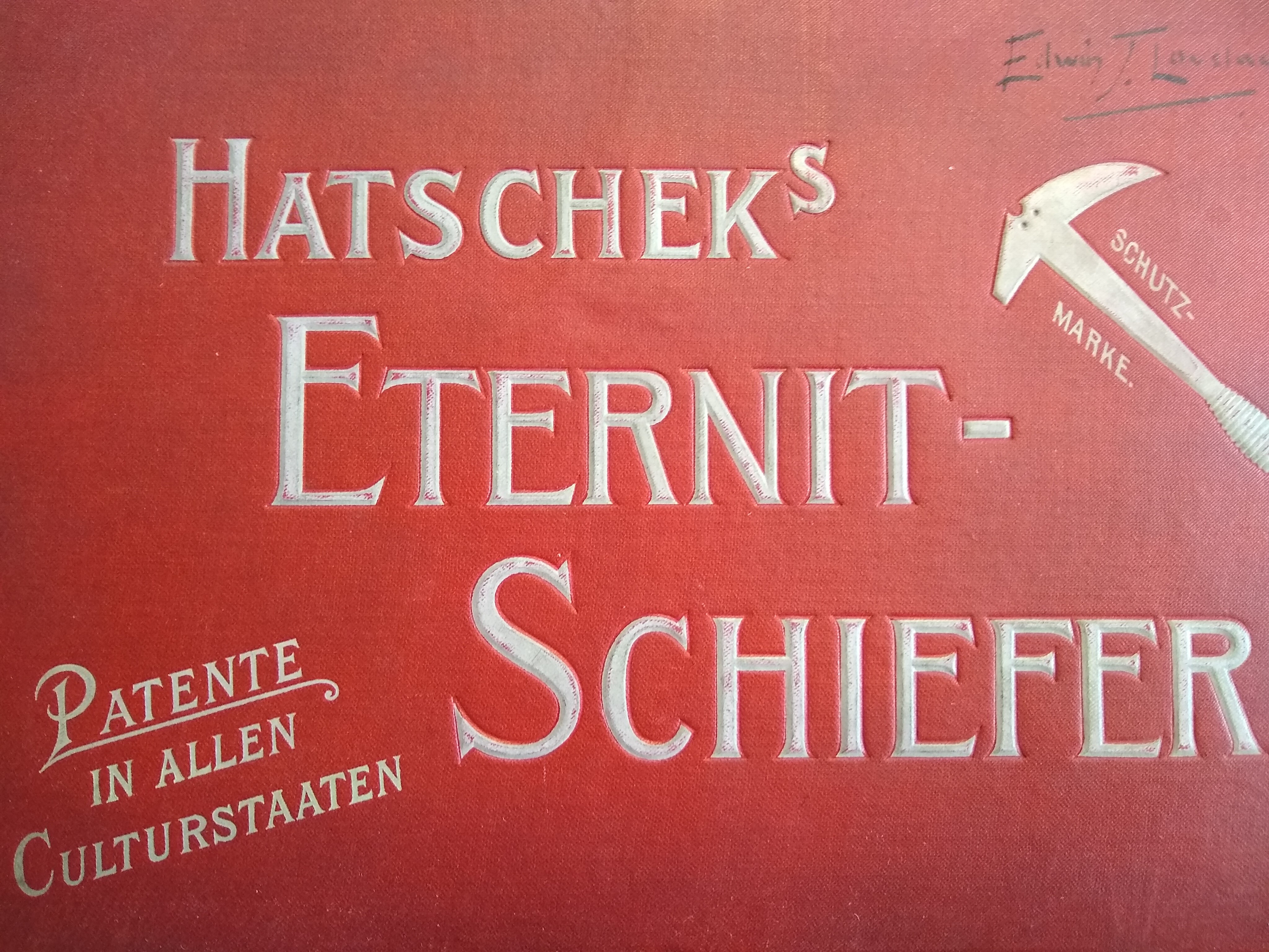
Front cover of a brochure for Hatscheks Eternit Schiefer (asbestos cement roof tiles)

Fibre-reinforced cement products were invented in the late 19th century by the Austrian Ludwig Hatschek. Principally he mixed 90% Portland cement and 10% asbestos fibres with water and ran it through a cardboard machine. Originally, the fibres were of asbestos and the material was commonly used as siding in house buildings due to its low cost, fire-resistance, water tightness, lightweight, and other useful properties. Asbestos turned out to be harmful to health and produces mesothelioma, a form of lung cancer, years after professional or occasional exposure (asbestosis). Starting from the seventies, asbestos use became progressively prohibited; however, in several countries, it is still used for building materials. Safer fibre alternatives, based on e.g. cellulose fibers were developed in the eighties and applied to secure the widely known strength of fibre cement.

In countries where asbestos use has been phased out, fibre cement was among the last remaining asbestos-containing materials on the market. The reason is that the asbestos fibres are intimately bound to the cement matrix and were first considered to be well immobilized in the cement and less prone to be released in the environment, suspended in the air, and inhaled in the lung than in other materials or applications such as thermal insulation or flocking in which bare asbestos fibres were used. However, asbestos fibres are inevitably released during machining operations of the objects made of fibre-cement and by long-term erosion of the materials exposed to atmospheric weathering and wind when cement degrades. Occupational health concerns and the protection of workers in the fibre-cement factories have finally led to the progressive elimination of asbestos from these products. For health reasons, it is recommended that existing fibre-cement products that are in good condition are left undisturbed and possibly encapsulated, to prevent fibre release.

== Material usage ==
Fibre cement is a main component of long-lasting building materials. The main application areas are roofing and cladding. The list below gives some common applications.

Internal cladding:

- Wet room applications – tile backer boards
- Fire protection
- Partition walls
- Window sills
- Ceilings and floors

External cladding:

- Flat sheets as base and/or architectural facing
- Flat sheets for e.g. windshields, wall copings, and soffits
- Corrugated sheets
- Slates as architectural full and partial-facing
- Underroof
- Planks

Roofing:

- Slates
- Corrugated sheets

Fibre-cement products have found wide usage in various sectors of construction: industrial, agricultural, domestic and residential buildings, mainly in roofing and cladding applications, for new constructions and refurbishment projects.

== See also ==
- Casale Monferrato
- Stephan Schmidheiny
