= Fibre cement =

Type of composite construction material

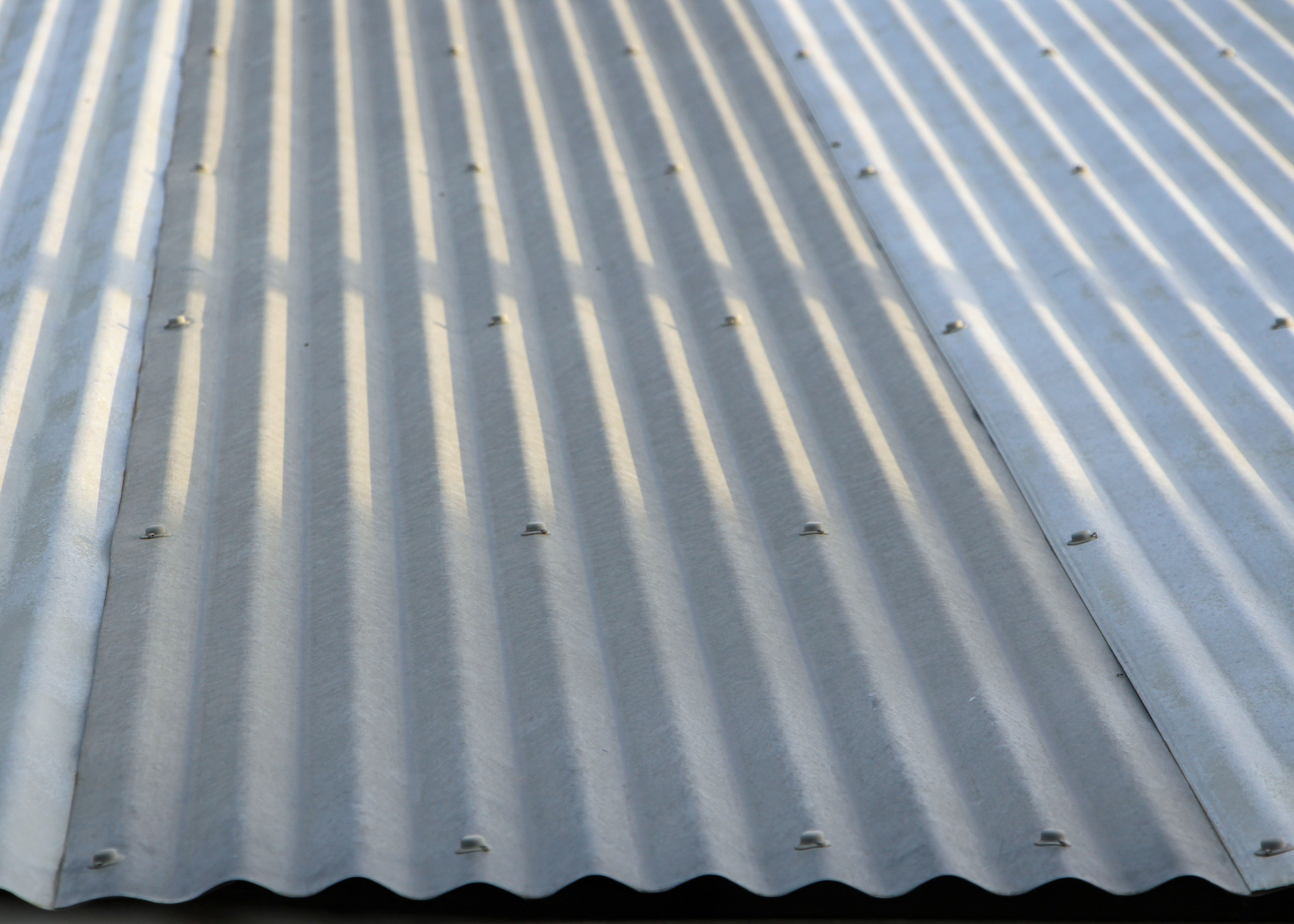
Corrugated fibre cement roofing

Fibre cement is a composite building and construction material, used mainly in roofing and siding products because of its strength and durability. One common use is in fiber cement siding on buildings.

== History ==
Fibre-reinforced cement-products were invented in the late 19th century by the Austrian Ludwig Hatschek. He mixed 90% cement and 10% asbestos fibres with water and ran it through a cardboard machine, forming strong thin sheets. Originally, the reinforcing fibres were of asbestos and the material was commonly used as residential siding due to its low cost, fire-resistance, water tightness, light weight, and other useful properties.

In the 1970s it became widely acknowledged that exposure to asbestos is harmful to health, being directly related to a number of life-threatening diseases including, asbestosis, pleural mesothelioma (lung) and peritoneal mesothelioma (abdomen). Consequently, asbestos use was progressively prohibited and safer fibre alternatives were developed, principally cellulose.

Fibre cement products were amongst the last materials available to have contained large quantities of asbestos. The asbestos fibres are intimately bound to the cement matrix and were treated as though they had been immobilized in the cement, unlike applications like thermal insulation or flocking, in which loose asbestos fibres were used. However, asbestos fibres are inevitably released during machining of the fibre-cement products, and by weathering of the material, which causes the cement to degrade. Occupational health concerns and the protection of workers in the fibre-cement factories have finally led to the progressive elimination of asbestos from these products.

While modern fibre cement boards may be free from asbestos they still may contain other harmful materials, such as sepiolite, inorganic fibre or formaldehyde.

== Description ==
Fibre cement construction materials contain fibre reinforcement, and are suitable for applications such as cladding and roofing.

Although fiber cement flat sheet may be classified under EN 12467:2012+A2:2018 in Category A1 (non-combustible - construction applications), A1Fl (non-combustible - flooring applications) or A2 (limited combustibility), some fiber cement sheet does not test as well. Additionally, some products may not have been tested by any accredited lab at all.

== Usage ==
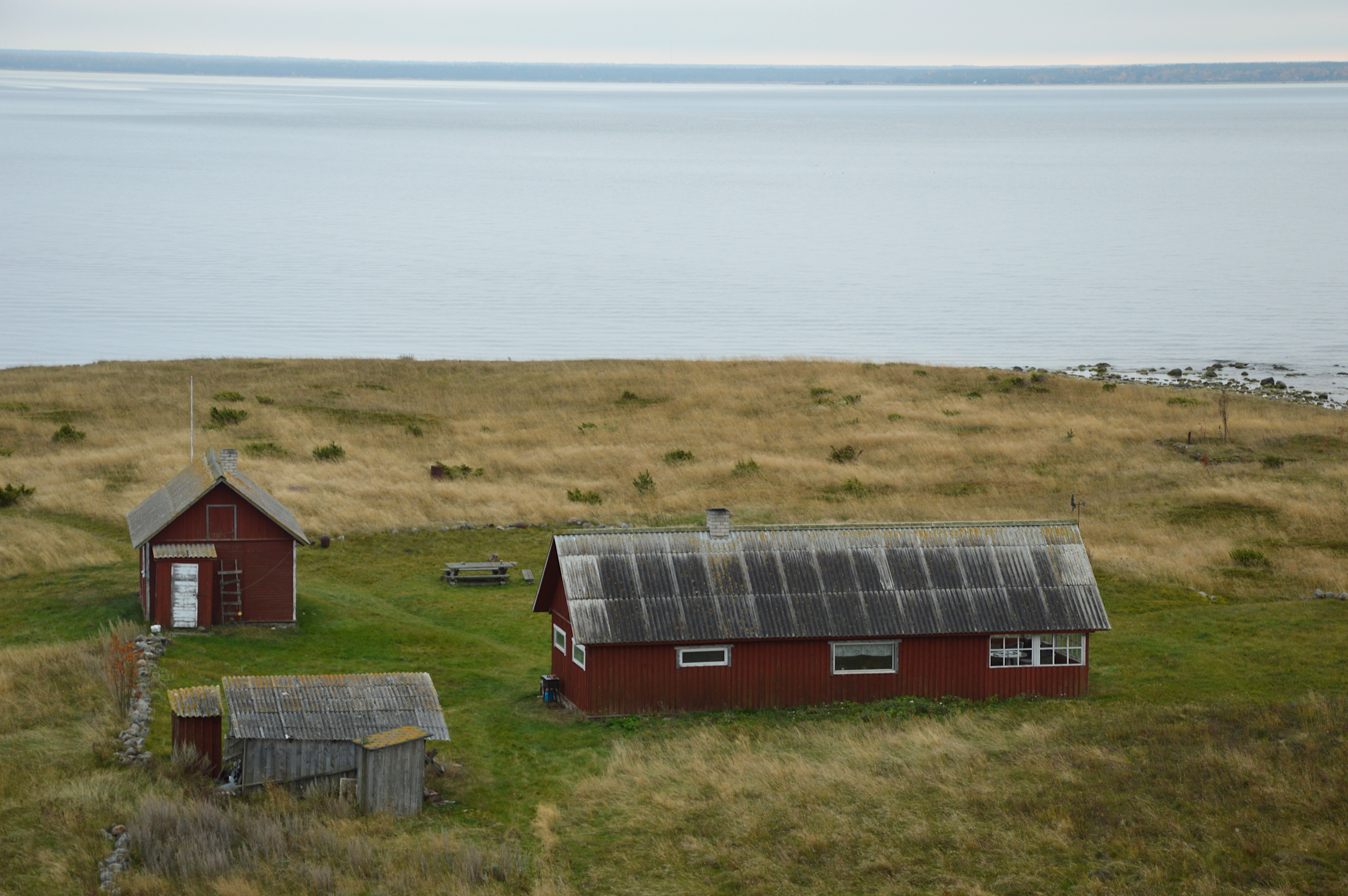
Older fibre cement roofing on Rammu island, Estonia

Fibre cement is used to produce long-lasting building materials. The main application areas are roofing and cladding. The list below gives some common applications.

Internal cladding:

- Wet room applications – tile backer boards
- Fire protection
- Partition walls
- Window sills
- Ceilings and floors

External cladding:

- Flat sheets as base and/or architectural facing
- Flat sheets for e.g. wind shields, wall copings, and soffits
- Corrugated sheets
- Slates as architectural full and partial facing
- Underroof
- Planks

Roofing:

- Slates
- Corrugated sheets
