= List of newspapers in Russia =

== National newspapers ==
=== Daily ===
Newspaper	Political alignment	References
Rossiyskaya Gazeta (Российская газета)	Big tent, Pro-Putin	
Izvestia	Pro-government	
RBK daily (РБК daily)	Center-right, Economic liberalism	
Kommersant (Коммерсантъ)	Centre-right, Economic liberalism	
Vedomosti (Ведомости)	Liberal conservatism	
Nezavisimaya Gazeta (Независимая газета)	Centrism	
Moskovskaya Pravda (Московская правда)	Communism, Left-wing populism	
Komsomolskaya Pravda (Комсомольская правда)	Populism, Soviet nationalism, pro-Putin	
Moskovsky Komsomolets (Московский комсомолец)	Left-wing populism	
Lenta.ru	Right-wing, Russian nationalism, Anti-Islam, Identitarianism	
Trud (Труд)	Labour interests, Left-wing populism	
Sovetsky Sport (Советский спорт)	Soviet nationalism, Left-wing populism	
Ura News (Уральский регион)	Уральский регион	
Vechernyaya Moskva (Вечерняя Москва)	Liberal conservatism, Economic liberalism, Pro-Putin	
Sankt-Peterburgskie Vedomosti (Санкт-Петербургские Ведомости)	Russian nationalism, Right-wing populism, Pro-Putin	
Meduza	Centrism	

=== 1 to 4 issues a week ===
- Argumenty i Fakty (Аргументы и Факты), weekly
- Argumenty Nedeli (Аргументы недели), weekly
- Krasnaya Zvezda (Красная Звезда), 3 issues a week
- Kultura (Культура), weekly
- Literaturnaya Gazeta (Литературная газета), weekly
- Novaya Gazeta (Новая газета), 3 issues a week, suspended publication after the start of the 2022 Russian invasion of Ukraine
- Pravda (Правда), 3 issue a week
- Zhizn (Жизнь), weekly

== Detailed list ==
Newspaper	Year founded	Published	Language	Distribution	Circulation	Publisher	Owner	References
Amurskaya Pravda			Russian	Blagoveshchensk				
Argumenty i Fakty	1978		Russian	National				
Business in Switzerland	2013	Daily	Russian	Switzerland				
Dagestanskaya Gazeta			Russian	Makhachkala				
Delovoy Gazeta.Yug	1997	Weekly	Russian	Krasnodar	5,000		Delovoy Petersburg	
Delovoy Petersburg	1993	Daily	Russian	Saint Petersburg	26,042 (11/08)	Bonnier Business Press	Bonnier Business Press	
Głos Kolejarzy Ewakuowanych — Golos Evakuirovannykh Zheleznodorozhnikov	1917–1918	Irregular	Polish and Russian	Moscow				
Guberniya				Petrozavodsk				
Irkutsk			Russian	Irkutsk				
Izvestia	1917	5 weekly	Russian	National	234,500	JSC "Izvestia Newspaper"	Gazprombank	
The Yekaterinburg Times			English	Yekaterinburg				
Karjalan Sanomat	1920		Finnish	Petrozavodsk				
The Kazan Herald	2010		English	Kazan				
Kodima			Russian	Petrozavodsk				
Kommersant	1909		Russian	National	131,000			
Komsomolskaya Pravda	1925		Russian					
Krasnaya Zvezda	1924		Russian				Ministry of Defence of the Russian Federation	
Krayniy Sever			Russian	Anadyr				
Kuryer Karelii			Russian	Petrozavodsk				
Le Courrier de Russie	2003	Bimonthly	French	Moscow and St Petersburg		Novy Vek Media		
Lyydilaine			Ludic	Petrozavodsk				
Moskovskaya Komsomolka	1999		Russian	Moscow		Evgeny Dodolev	Boris Berezovsky	
Moskovskaya Pravda	1918		Russian	Moscow	304,529		Newspaper's journalists	
Moskovski Korrespondent	2007		Russian					
Moskovskij Komsomolets	1919		Russian	Moscow			Pavel Gusev	
Moscow News	1930	Ceased	English	Moscow				
The Moscow Times	1992	Weekly	English	Moscow, Moscow Oblast	55,000	MoscowTimes LLC	MoscowTimes LLC	
Muzykalnaya Pravda	1995		Russian	Moscow			Evgeny Dodolev	
Nauka v Sibiri			Russian	Novosibirsk				
New Medical Gazette	1992		Russian	Moscow			Newspaper's journalists	
Nezavisimaya Gazeta	1990		Russian					
Nezavisimoye Voyennoye Obozreniye	1995	Weekly	Russian	Moscow	12,000			
Nizhegorodskaya Pravda			Russian	Nizhny Novgorod				
Novaya Gazeta	1993	Triweekly	Russian	National	90,000			
Novgorod	1990		Russian	Veliky Novgorod				
Novy Vzglyad	1992		Russian	Moscow			Evgeny Dodolev, Kirsan Ilyumzhinov	
Novye Izvestiya	1997		Russian	Moscow				
Oma Mua			Karelian	Petrozavodsk				
Parlamentskaya Gazeta	1997		Russian					
Petrozavodsk				Petrozavodsk				
Pravda	1908		Russian	National				
Primorskaya Gazeta			Russian	Vladivostok				
Rossiyskaya Gazeta	1990		Russian					
Russia Beyond	2007		English, French, Spain, Italian	World			Rossiyskaya Gazeta	
Sakha Sire	1921		Yakut	Yakutsk				
Samarskaya Gazeta			Russian	Samara				
Samarskoe Obozrenie			Russian	Samara				
Se Korea Sinmun	1949	Weekly	Korean, Russian	Yuzhno-Sakhalinsk				
Sovetsky Sakhalin	1925	4 weekly	Russian	Yuzhno-Sakhalinsk				
Sovetsky Sport	1924		Russian			Komsomolskaya Pravda Publishing House	JSC Sovetsky Sport and Russian Olympic Committee	
Strana Kaliningrad			Russian	Kaliningrad				
Surgutskaya Tribuna			Russian	Surgut				
The St. Petersburg Times	1993 - 2014		English	Saint Petersburg				
Tikhookeanskaya Gazeta			Russian	Khabarovsk				
Tribuna	1969	Weekly	Russian	National	124,000	Tribun Publishing House	Gazprom Media	
Trud	1921		Russian					
Tverskaya Zhizn			Russian	Tver				
Tvoy Den			Russian					
Tyumenskaya oblastʹ segodnya			Russian	Tyumen				
Vecherniy Kazan	1979		Russian	Kazan	33,334	Evening Kazan Publishing House		
Vecherniy Krasnoyarsk	1989	Weekly	Russian	Krasnoyarsk				
Vecherniy Murmansk	1991		Russian	Murmansk				
Vecherniy Novosibirsk		5 weekly	Russian	Novosibirsk				
Vecherniy Stavropol			Russian	Stavropol				
Vechernyaya Moskva	1923		Russian	Moscow	1.39 Million (in year 2016)			
Vedomosti	1999		Russian					
Versia	1998	Weekly	Russian	National	170,000		Nikolay Zyatkov	
Vienan Karjala			Karelian	Petrozavodsk				
Volgogradskaya Pravda			Russian	Volgograd				
Vremya Novostei	2000		Russian					
Yakutiya			Russian					
Zeyskiye Ogni			Russian	Svobodny				
Zhizn			Russian					

== See also ==
- History of Russian journalism
- List of newspapers in Ukraine
- Media of Russia
- TASS, known now as ITAR-TASS, News agency
- RIA Novosti, News agency
- Interfax, News agency
