= Karelian alphabet =

Writing systems of the Karelian language

The Karelian language has seen numerous proposed and adopted alphabets over the centuries, both Latin and Cyrillic. In 2007, the current standardized Karelian alphabet was introduced and is used to write all varieties of Karelian, including Tver Karelian which adopted it in 2017.

In Russia, Karelian is spoken mostly in the Karelian Republic and in a small region just north of Tver. It is a non-regional minority language in Finland.

== History ==
=== Middle Ages ===
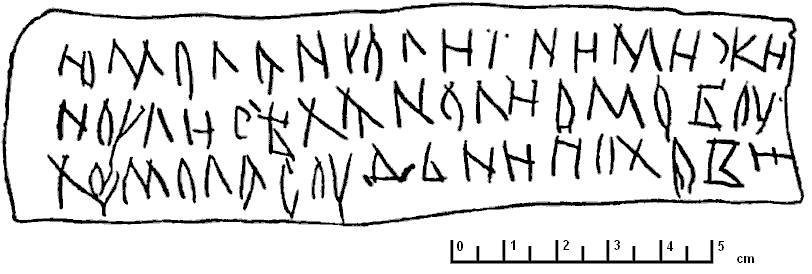
Text of Birch bark letter no. 292

The oldest known document in Karelian, or in any Finnic language, is the Birch bark letter no. 292, found in 1957 and believed to be either an invocation against lightning, or an oath. Until the 19th century it is believed that Karelian was only written down by individuals; it was not taught in schools.

=== 19th and early 20th centuries ===
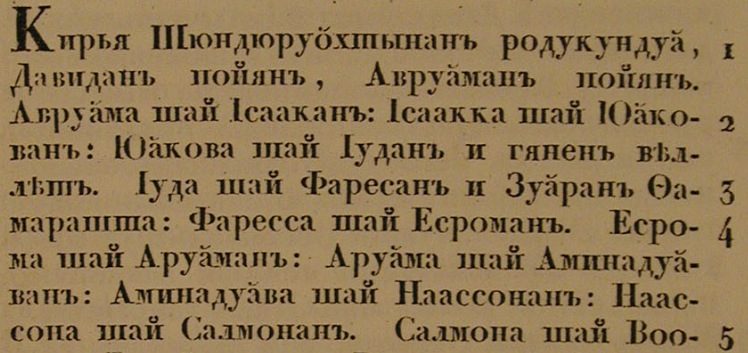
Translation of Matthew into Karelian, 1820

In the 19th century a few books were published in Karelian using Cyrillic, the first known one was A Translation of some Prayers and a Shortened Catechism into North Karelian and Olonets (Aunus) dialects in 1804. Karelian literature in 19th century Russia remained limited to a few primers, songbooks and leaflets.

The letters used to transcribe Karelian sounds varied. For example, in the gospel of St. Matthew (Герранъ мія̈нъ. Шондю-руохтынанъ святой і᷍ованг̧ели матвѣйста, Карьяланъ кїӗлѣлля) in the South Karelian Tver dialect, in 1820, they used vowels with breves, circumflexes, and г with a cedilla:

In the Карельско-Русскій Букварь (Karelian–Russian ABC-Book), 1887:

- Г̄ was used for the sound /ɡ/ (Modern Karelian/Finnish "g")
- Г without a macron represented /h/ (Modern Karelian/Finnish "h")
- Е was used for /e/
- both І and И were used for Modern Karelian/Finnish "i"
- ІЙ was used for Modern Karelian/Finnish "ii"
- Ы was used for the sound /y/ (Modern Karelian/Finnish "y")
- Ю̈ was used for the sound /jy/ (Modern Karelian/Finnish "jy")
- Ѣ was used for Modern Karelian/Finnish ä
- Ъ was used at the end of all words that did not end in a vowel or soft sign, as in the Russian language before the Revolution

Another example: in the Русско-Корельскій Словарь (Russian–Karelian Dictionary), 1908,

- А̄ was used for modern Karelian/Finnish ä (instead of Ѣ)
- Г҅ was used for /h/
- У҅ was used for /y/
- Ў was used for non-syllabic /u/
- Э was used for /e/ instead of Ѣ in the 1887 text

Tver State University Finno-Ugricist Lyudmila Georgievna Gromova points out in one great difficulty in these early Karelian Cyrillic alphabets, was the inconsistency in rendering the sounds a, ä, ja, jä, ö, jö, y, and jy. For example, in the 1820 translation of Matthew, "я" might represent the sound ä, ja, or jä.

=== Soviet period ===
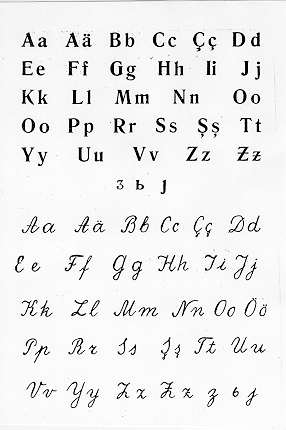
Tver Karelian 1930 alphabet

In 1921, the first all-Karelian congress under the Soviet regime debated between whether Finnish or Karelian should be the official language (alongside Russian) of the new "Karelian Labour Commune", which two years later would become the Karelian ASSR. In the end they chose Finnish over Karelian.

Nonetheless, some publishing continued in Cyrillic. The research into Karelian folklore of Maria Mikhailovskaya, a teacher from the Vozdvizhenskaya school of Bezhetsky District, was published in 1925. In August–December 1929, the newspaper Tverskaya Derevnya (Tver Village), printed in Cyrillic, became the first newspaper ever published in the Karelian language.

=== Latin alphabet for Tver Karelian (1930) ===
In 1930–31, a Karelian literary language using the Latin alphabet was standardized for the Tver Karelian community, south of the Karelian ASSR and north of Tver, with the following alphabet:

Aa Ää Bb Cc Çç Dd Ee Ff Gg Hh Ii Jj Kk Ll Mm Nn Oo Öö Pp Rr Ss Şş Tt Yy Uu Vv Zz Ƶƶ з ь ȷ

Note the additional letters borrowed from Cyrillic: з (/dʒ/) and ь (/ɯ/), as well as the unusual Latin ƶ (/ʒ/) and ȷ (j without dot, to denote palatalization).

=== Unified Cyrillic Karelian alphabet (1937–40) ===
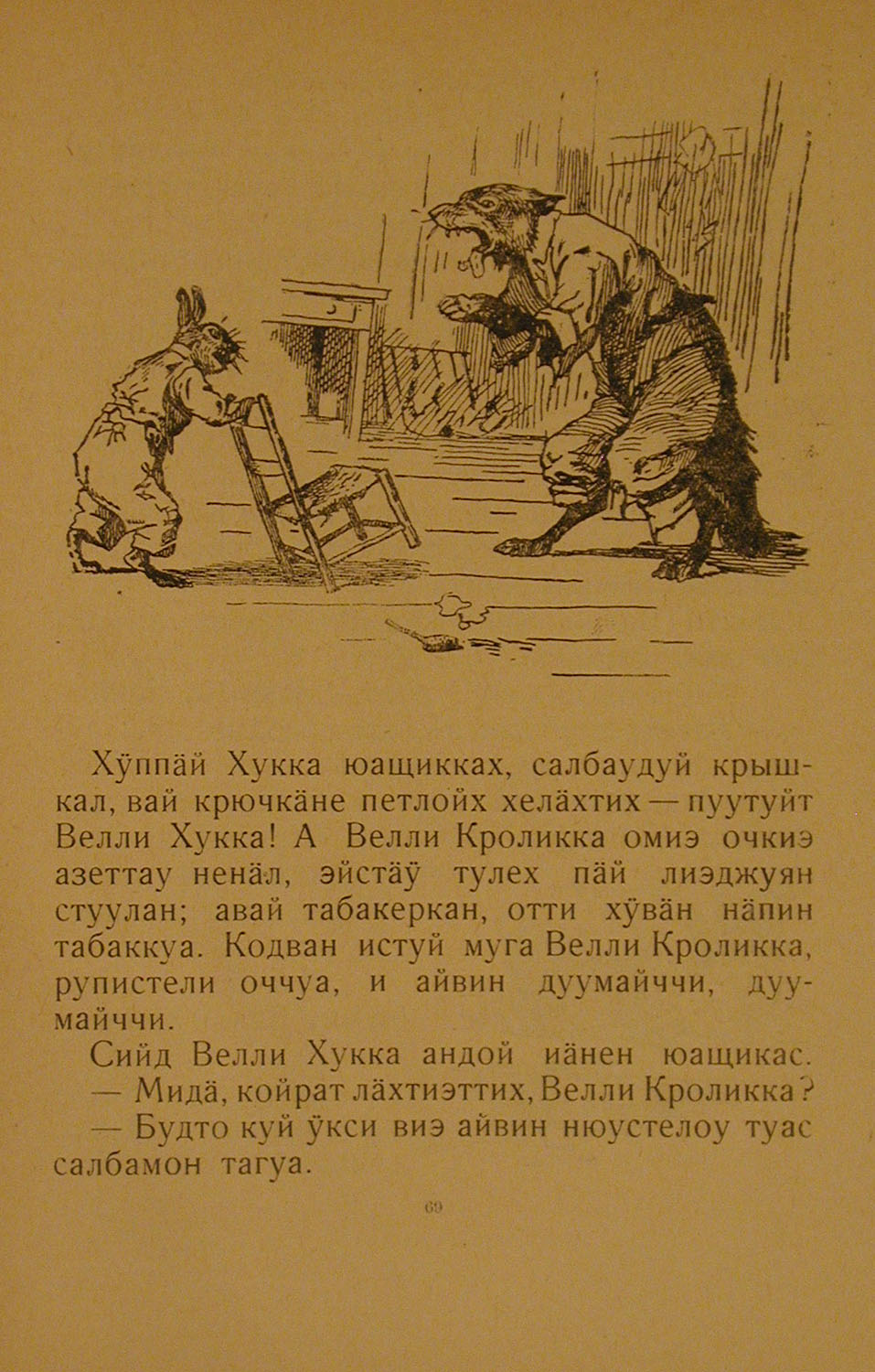
Дядя Римусан Суарнат (Djadja Rimusan Suarnat), Tales of Uncle Remus in Karelian Cyrillic alphabet, 1939

In 1937 the government wished to replace the use of Finnish (in the Karelian ASSR) and Karelian written in Latin (in the Tver Region), with a single standard Karelian language written in Cyrillic. Two proposals were sourced.

- One proposal was published in October 1937 by the Karelian educational affairs people's commissariat, which included the following letters with diaereses: А, Е, О, У, Ю, Я
- Another proposal was published by Karjalaisen piirikunnan alphabetization project (Karjalaisen piirikunnan aakkosprojekti), and included the following letters with macrons (bars): А Е О У, and also included Ӡ (for the "dzh" sound) and І. Е̄ (Е with macron) replaced Russian Ё. Some of the equivalents to Latin letters were as follows:

Cyrillic letter(s)	Latin equivalent
А̄	ä
Е	e (not "je")
О̄ (О with macron)	ö
Ӯ	y
Я	ja
ІА̄	jä
Е̄ (Е with macron)	jo
ІŌ (І + О with macron)	jö
Ю	ju
ІӮ	jü
Ӡ	dž

However, in the end a proposal was adopted with fewer non-standard Cyrillic letters: it included the entire Russian alphabet plus the letters Ӓ, Ӧ, and Ӱ.

On September 8, 1937, at the proposal of its chairman, M.I. Kalinin, the Presidium of the Central Executive Committee discussed the Cyrillization of the Karelian language. The final orthography was approved by the Karelian Regional Committee on February 10, 1938 and published in the newspaper Karelʹskaya Pravda. On February 14, the RSFSR People's Commissariat issued decree no. 214, introducing the single Karelian language in the Cyrillic alphabet.

From 1937–39 the Soviet government used the new Karelian standard language written in Cyrillic in both the Karelian SSR and Tver Region.

During this period Sovetskoi Karelija was written in Karelian using Cyrillic, rather than in Finnish.

The effort was dropped in 1940 and Finnish (written as always in the Latin alphabet) once again became an official language of the Karelian SSR. The reason for abandoning Cyrillic, and the Karelian language itself, as the national language of the republic may have two explanations:

- Difficulty of implementation:
  - insufficient variety of literature available in Karelian
  - difficulty of finding enough teachers qualified to teach in the language
  - unfamiliarity with the new standardized language to speakers of the existing dialects which were very different from one another
- Political reasons: On March 31, 1940 the Karelian ASSR became a full-fledged SSR, the Karelo-Finnish SSR, expanded with territory won from Finland in the Winter War. Some later historians explained this as a "convenient means for facilitating the possible incorporation of additional Finnish territory" (or, possibly, the whole of Finland) into the USSR. Under this theory, Finnish (with far more speakers and a far more established literary tradition) would logically become the national language of the expanded republic, so it made no sense to continue with Karelian.

=== Olonets Karelian alphabet (1989–2007) ===
Olonets Karelian alphabet was approved in 1989 and it was used to write Olonets Karelian (also known as Livvi Karelian). It was replaced by the unified Karelian alphabet in 2007. The alphabet consisted of twenty-nine characters, and it was very similar to the modern alphabet:

A B Č D Ǯ E F G H I J K L M N O P R S Š Z Ž T U V Ü Ä Ö ʼ

In the Olonets Karelian alphabet, the letter Ǯ was used instead of the digraph Dž to mark the voiced affricate. For example, the word mandžoi ('strawberry') was written manǯoi. For the computers used in those days, the letter ǯ was problematic, and in many cases it had to be inserted manually afterwards. The letter Ü represented the same vowel sound as the letter Y used in the modern alphabet.

== Current Karelian alphabet (2007–) ==
The modern unified Karelian alphabet is used to write all variants of the Karelian language including Tver Karelian, which adopted it in 2017. It consists of a total of 29 characters: 23 are from the ISO basic Latin alphabet, 5 are derived from basic Latin letters by the addition of diacritical marks, and the final character is the apostrophe, which signifies palatalization of the preceding sound. The entire range of sounds of native Karelian words and sounds that are found only in loanwords but have become an established part of the Karelian language (f in Ludic, c f in Livvi and Tver, b c d f g z ž in North Karelian) is intended to be represented by this set of characters.

Majuscule forms
A	B	C	Č	D	E	F	G	H	I	J	K	L	M	N	O	P	R	S	Š	Z	Ž	T	U	V	Y	Ä	Ö	ʼ
Minuscule forms
a	b	c	č	d	e	f	g	h	i	j	k	l	m	n	o	p	r	s	š	z	ž	t	u	v	y	ä	ö	ʼ

This unified alphabet was approved in 2007 (without the letter C) as a replacement for the separate Olonets Karelian and Karelian Proper alphabets. The letters Ä and Ö are vowels which, unlike the German umlauts, are considered to be distinct and are alphabetized separately from the corresponding vowels without the umlauts. The postalveolar consonants Č, Š and Ž can be replaced by the digraphs Ch, Sh and Zh when writing the caron is impossible or inconvenient—for example ruočči ('Swedish') may be written as ruochchi.

On May 29, 2014, the letter C was added to the unified alphabet. The letter may be used in Ludic Karelian native words and is allowed for use in loanwords in Livvi Karelian and in Karelian proper. Before that, Livvi Karelian and Karelian proper had used ts for transcribing the affricate /ts/ in loanwords.

=== Letter names and IPA ===
Names of letters in Karelian
Letter	Letter name	IPA
A	aa	/ɑ/
B	bee	/b/
C	cee	/ts/
Č	čee	/tʃ/
D	dee	/d/
E	ee	/e/
F	ef	/f/
G	gee	/ɡ/
H	hoo	/h/
I	ii	/i/
J	jii	/j/
K	koo	/k/
L	el	/l/
M	em	/m/
N	en	/n/
O	oo	/o/
P	pee	/p/
R	er	/r/
S	es	/s/
Š	šee	/ʃ/
Z	zee	/z/
Ž	žee	/ʒ/
T	tee	/t/
U	uu	/u/
V	vee	/v/
Y	yy	/y/
Ä	ää	/æ/
Ö	öö	/ø/
ʼ	pehmendysmerki (Livvi) pehmennyšmerkki (Proper) pehmenduspilʼkeh (Ludic)	/ʲ/

The apostrophe is used to represent palatalization. In native words, it is found in lʼ nʼ sʼ tʼ in North Karelian, in dʼ lʼ nʼ rʼ sʼ tʼ in Livvi Karelian, and in dʼ lʼ nʼ rʼ sʼ zʼ tʼ in Ludic and Tver Karelian, but other palatalized consonants are also used in names and loanwords from Russian.

The letters Q, W, and X do not belong to the Karelian alphabet, they are only used in unassimilated loanwords and names. In assimilated loanwords, qu is replaced by kv, w by v, and x by ks.

== See also ==
- Ludic language
