= Mikhaylovskoye, Republic of Karelia =

Mikhaylovskoye Михайловское
- Village
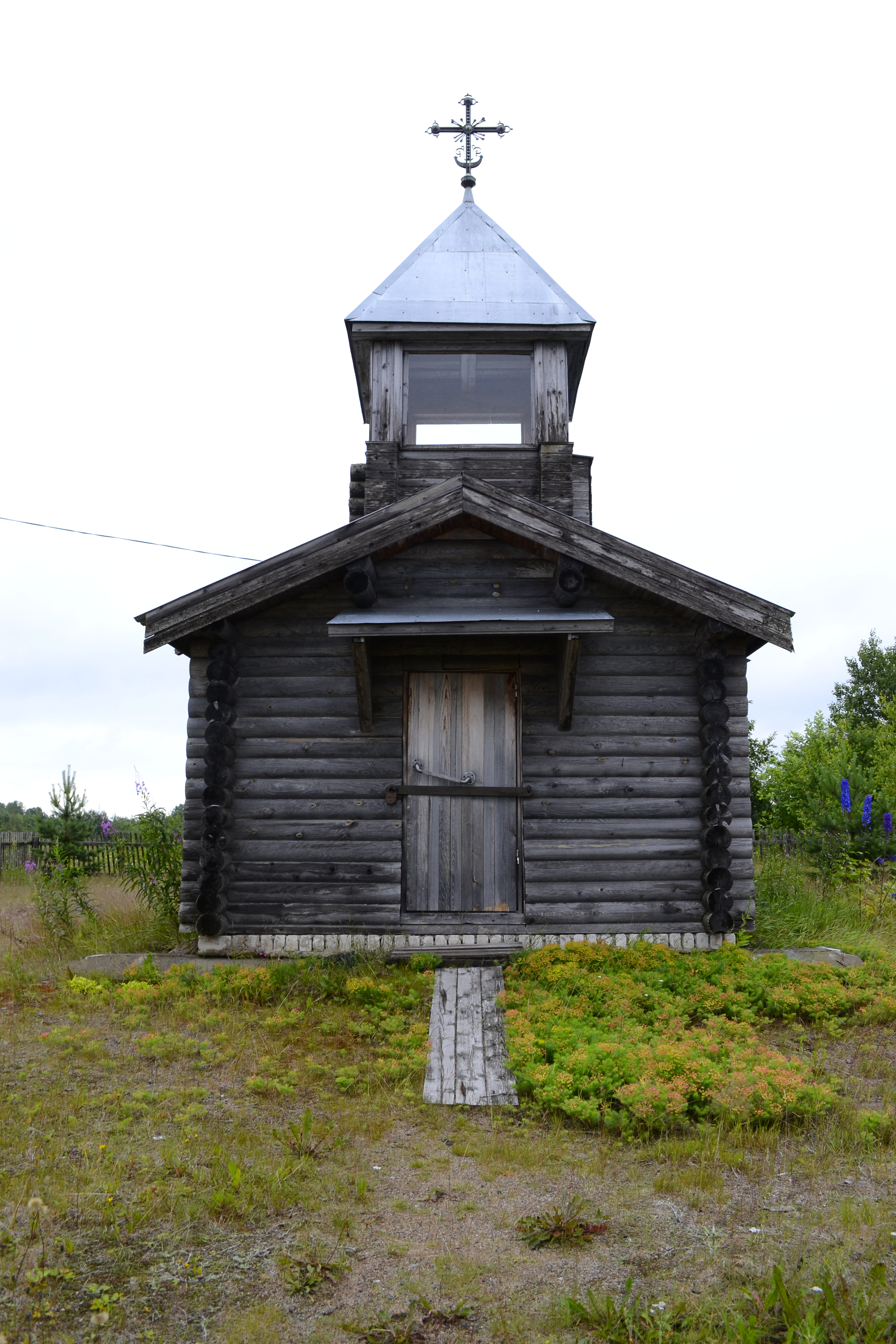
- Village chapel in Mikhaylovskoye

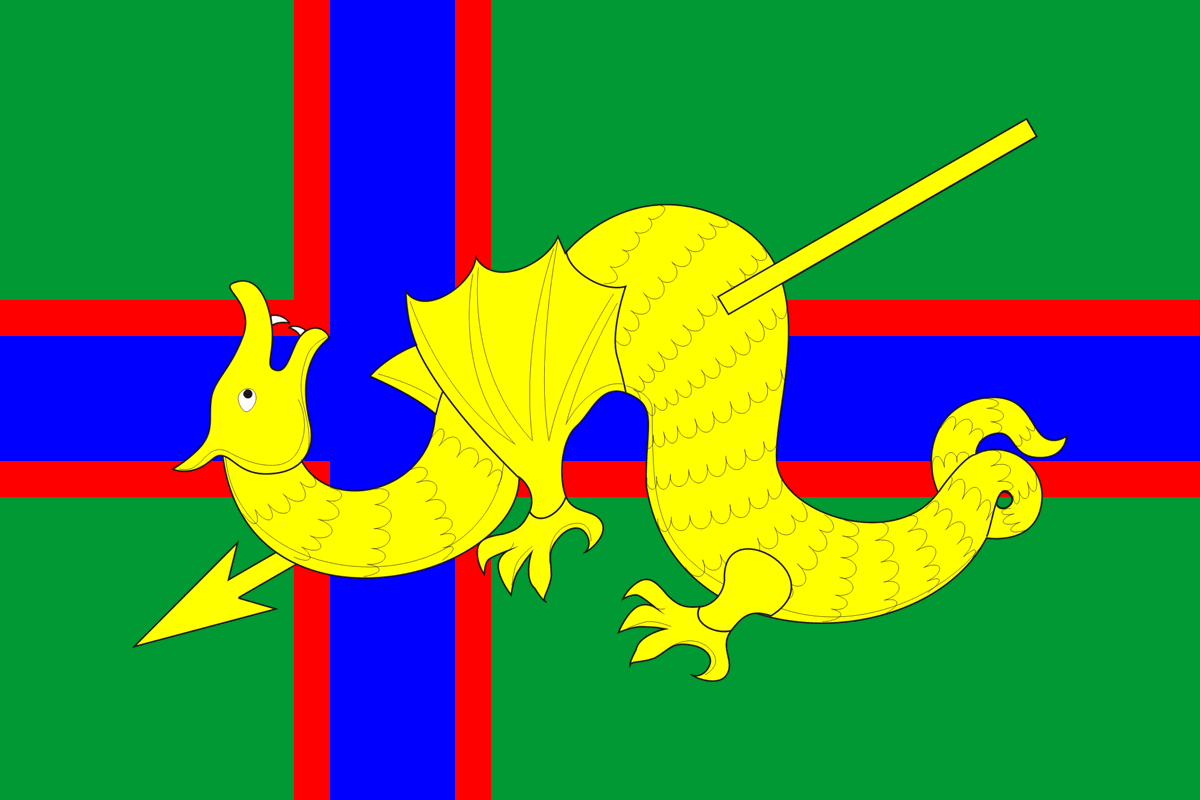
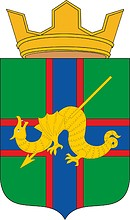
- Flag Coat of arms

- Location within Karelia Location within Russia
- Coordinates: 61°00′52″N 33°43′57″E
- Country: Russia
- Region: Republic of Karelia
- District: Olonetsky District
- Rural settlement: Mikhaylovskoye Rural Settlement

Population (2013)
  - Total: 377
- Time zone: UTC+3:00

Mikhaylovskoye (Russian: Михайловское) (Note: Ludian: Mihailouskuo, Mihailouskuu or Mihaalouskuu; also Kujärv, but see § History) is a village (selo) in Olonetsky District, Karelia, Russia. It is located by the river Kirga between the lakes Dolgoye and Loyanskoye, about 52 kilometers (32 mi) away from the district center Olonets. As of 2013, the village had a population of 377.

Mikhaylovskoye is the municipal center of the Mikhaylovskoye rural settlement within the Olonetsky District. Aside from Mikhaylovskoye itself, the municipality includes the villages of Gizhino and Tashkenitsy.

The Ludic language is traditionally spoken in the village, and Mikhaylovskoye is a center of Ludic culture in the Svir region.

== History ==
Historically, the area of modern Mikhaylovskoye was called Loyanitsy (Ludian: Kujär’v), while its main village was known as Mikhaylovskaya (S’ür’d’). The earliest known mention of Loyanitsy dates to 1563, when it was a volost under the Vazhiny parish (pogost). In a document from 1582 or 1583, a wooden church dedicated to Saint George is mentioned in Mikhaylovskaya. Loyanitsy would eventually become a separate parish, being mentioned as such in 1845, and a new brick church had been built on the site of the older wooden church in 1823.

In the late 19th and early 20th centuries, Loyanitsy comprised 11–12 villages:

- Gizhino, Tashkenitsy, Palnavolok, Mikhaylovskaya and Kirga by the lake Loyanskoye;
- Ustye, Kukoynavolok, Nyukhovo, Yakovlevskaya and Novikovo by the lake Dolgoye;
- Moshnichye along the river Vazhinka, comprising Moshnichye proper and Vasilyevskaya, which were counted as separate villages in some censuses, but together in others.

In 1873, the villages had a combined population of 1,099, most of whom were Karelians. Some Russians also lived in the parish center Mikhaylovskaya, while the residents of Vasilyevskaya were recorded as "Chuds".

By 1926, the area had been reorganized into the Mikhaylovsky selsoviet, with its center in the village of Ustye. In that year, the selsoviet had a population of 2,243, which began to decline soon after due to dekulakization and the Great Purge. Starting in the late 1950s, many villages in the selsoviet were abolished as unpromising and their population was relocated into the central settlement of Mikhaylovskoye, established on the site of Ustye. The villages of Mikhaylovskaya, Kirga, Palnavolok and Ustye had been merged into one settlement in 1957.

The village church burned down in 1924 or 1928. Currently, there is a village chapel (eukterion) in Mikhaylovskoye.
