= The St. Petersburg Times =

The St. Petersburg Times may refer to the following:

- The St. Petersburg Times (Russia), a former Russian newspaper
- The St. Petersburg Times, former name of the Tampa Bay Times, an American newspaper
