= EnglishRussia.com =

Photoblog of unusual Russian culture

EnglishRussia was a popular photoblog focusing on unusual aspects of Russian or former-Soviet culture. In 2007 Technorati rated it the 155th most popular website out of 94 million on its search engine. It was created by a Russian software technician and is currently more popular in America than in Russia.

The publication has experienced issues throughout its history. The Facebook page was hacked, and between June 13, 2009 and June 14, 2009, the design of the website changed, becoming more "clean", without logo. The privacy policy was written in Portuguese and the ads were controlled by a Brazilian company. With these changes, many old pages lost their pictures and some articles were not readable anymore. The email address does not answer. The official Twitter account and Facebook no longer exist. As of 2023 the site appears defunct with its last content posted on May 1, 2022

It has been mentioned by many media sources, newspapers or websites such as The St. Petersburg Times, Softpedia, and The Daily Telegraph.
