= Union of Karelian People =

- Regional Public Organization "Union of Karelian People"
- Karjalan Rahvahan Liitto
- Formation: 1989
- Founder: Petr Zaiko
- Type: NGO
- Headquarters: Petrozavodsk
- Location: Russia
- Region served: Republic of Karelia
- Head: Vorobey Natalia Petrovna
- Website: https://vk.com/karjalanrahvahanliitto
- Formerly called: Society of Karelian Culture

Union of Karelian People (Russian: Союз карельского народа, Karelian: Karjalan Rahvahan Liitto) or Regional Public Organization "Union of Karelian People" (Russian: Региональная общественная организация "Союз карельского народа", Karelian: Alovehelline yhteiskunnalline yhtistys "Karjalan Rahvahan Liitto") or RPO "UKP" (Russian: РОО "СКН", Karelian: AYY "KRL") is a regional Karelian public organization dedicated to the preservation and development of the Karelian culture and the Karelian language. It carries out its activities in the Republic of Karelia and other regions of the Russian Federation, Finland and other Karelian communities. It is one of the biggest and oldest Karelian culture organizations in Russia.

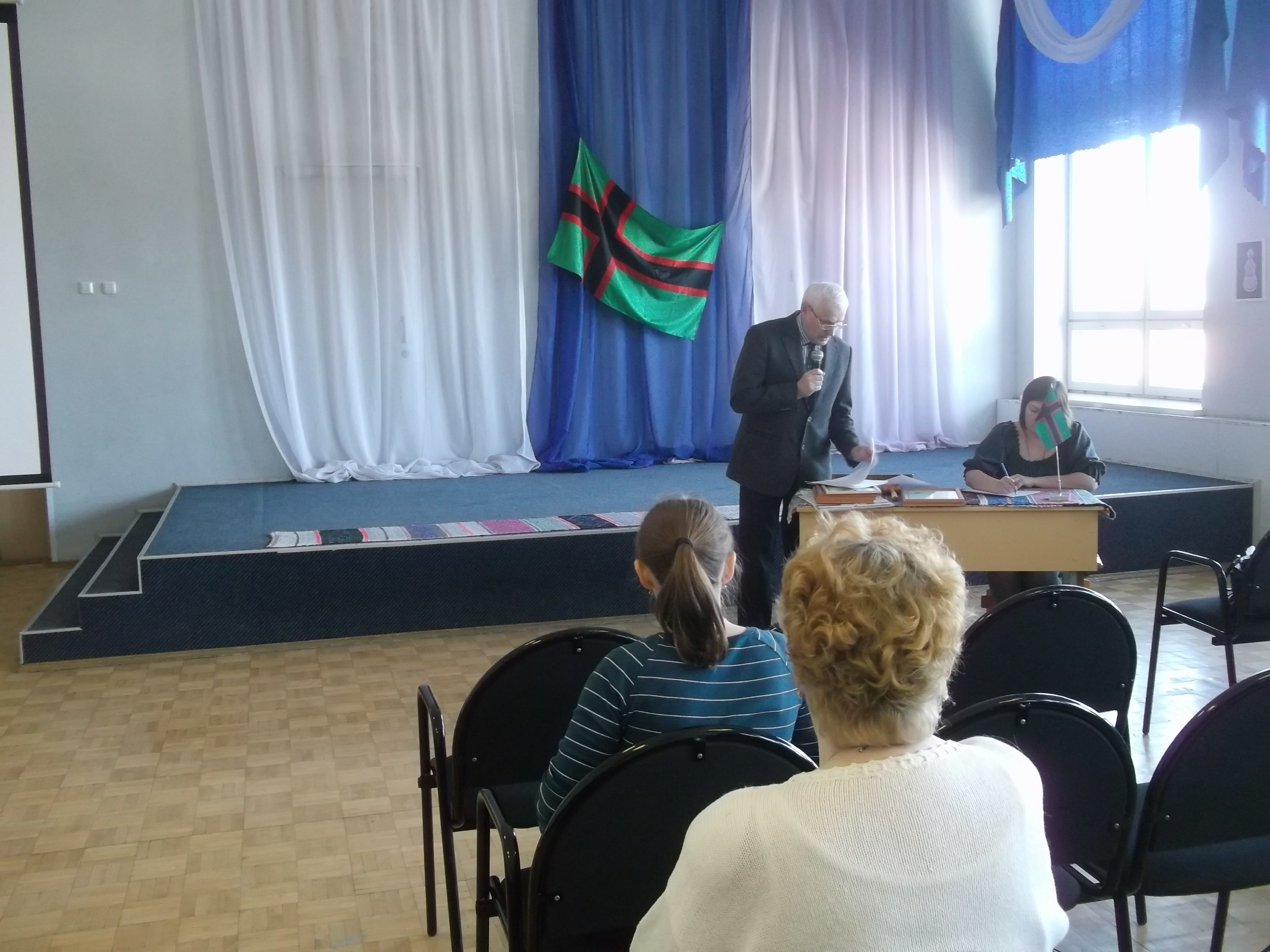
Meeting of the "Union of the Karelian people" in Petrozavodsk on March 17, 2013

== History ==
On May 25, 1989, the Karelian national-cultural public organization "Society of Karelian Culture" was created, which was registered in August 1989 and was renamed to the "Union of the Karelian People". The organization is responsible for creating the "Oma Pajo" choir, Finnish language "Carelia" newspaper and the "Oma Mua" newspaper in 1990 and "Vienan Karjala" newspaper in 2000. The Union of Karelian People also organized education in Karelian in the PetrSU, the "Čičiliusku" puppet theatre company and popularized the game of Kyykkä in the Republic. The UKP works closely with the Ministry of the Republic of Karelia for National Policy and the Finnish Union of White Sea Karelians. The organization also helps to translate various government projects into Karelian.

== Goals ==
- Protection and development of the Karelian language
- Research and distribution of the knowledge about the past of the Karelian people
- Taking part in discussions concerning the Karelian people
- Protection and development of the native languages of Karelia
- Popularization of Karelian culture
- Creation of Karelian language courses

== See also ==
- Karjalan Liitto, Finnish organization of Karelian evacuees
- National Theatre of Karelia works closely with the organization
- Music in the Republic of Karelia
