= Kodima =

Monthly Vepsian-language newspaper

- Founded: 1993
- Language: Veps and Russian
- Headquarters: Petrozavodsk
- Website: kodima.rkperiodika.ru

Kodima is a Veps and Russian-language monthly published in Petrozavodsk, in the Republic of Karelia, which is distributed for free. It's the only newspaper published in Veps language.

== History ==
The first issue was published in April 1993 by Periodika, which also publishes Karjalan Sanomat, Oma Mua and Vienan Karjala. Nina Zaitseva, a linguist scientist, was the first chief editor.

Marina Giniatullina serves as current chief-editor.

== Chief editors ==
- Nina Zaitseva
- Irina Sotnikova
- Marina Giniatullina
