= Vedlozero =

Vedlozero Ведлозеро Vieljärvi (Karelian)
- Selo
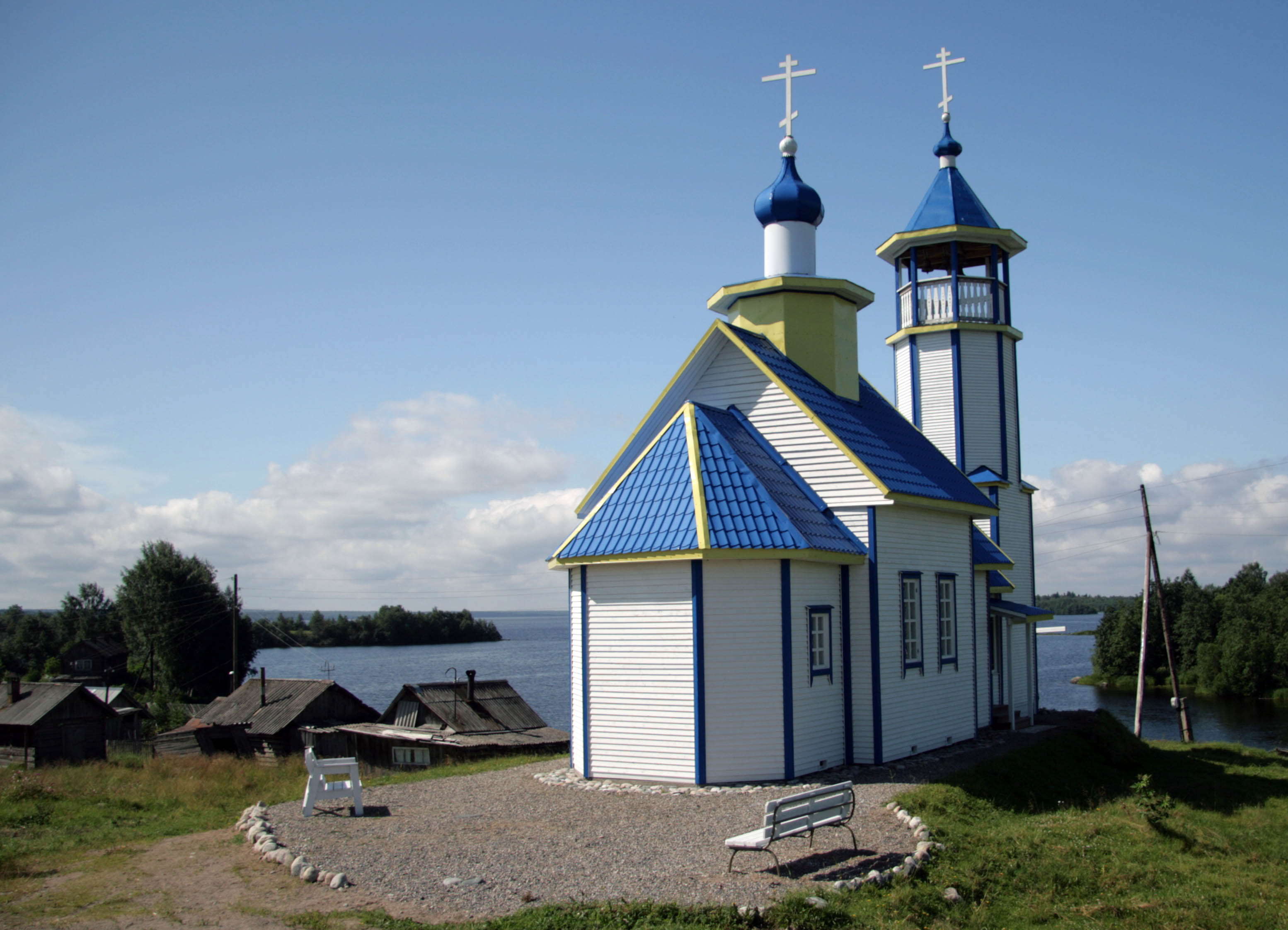
- Vedlozero church
- Interactive map of Vedlozero
- Location of Vedlozero Vedlozero (Karelia)
- Coordinates: 61°34′N 32°50′E
- Country: Russia
- Federal subject: Republic of Karelia
- Administrative district: Pryazhinsky District

Population (2010 Census)
  - Total: 948
  - Estimate (2021): 437 (−53.9%)

Municipal status
  - Municipal district: Pryazhinsky National District
  - Rural settlement: Vedlozerskoye Rural Settlement
  - Capital of: Vedlozerskoye Rural Settlement
- Time zone: UTC+3 (UTC+03:00)
- Postal code: 186143
- OKTMO ID: 86639405101

Vedlozero population
- 2010 Census: 1,005\
- 2002 Census: 1,236\

Vedlozero (Russian: Ведлозеро, Karelian: Vieljärvi) is an old Karelian village in Russia, the administrative center of the Vedlozerskoye rural settlement of the Pryazhinsky District of the Republic of Karelia.

== General information ==
Vedlozero is located on the northeastern shore of Lake Vedlozero, at the confluence of the Vohta River, 50 km from the regional center.

The village contains a pedigree farm, a forestry, a secondary school, a kindergarten, a feldsher point, a cultural center, and a library.

The Karelian Vieljärvi choir organized in 1938 by I. Levkin is still operating.

In 2013, the Karelian Language House (Karelian: Karjalan kielen kodi) was established in the village.

== History ==
The village is first mentioned in a document from the 16th century. The Vedlozero pogost was part of the Obonezhskaya Pyatina of the Novgorod Feudal Republic.

== Population ==
The population in 1989 was 1,445.
