= Ludic language =

Finnic language of southern Karelia, Russia

Ludic
- lyydin kielʹ, lʹyydʹikielʹ
- Native to: Russia (Republic of Karelia)
- Region: Near northwestern shore of Lake Onega
- Native speakers: 300 (2017)
- Language family: Uralic: Finnic; Northern Finnic; Ludic
- Writing system: Latin (Karelian alphabet)

Official status
- Recognised minority language in: Republic of Karelia

Language codes
- ISO 639-3: lud
- Glottolog: ludi1246
- ELP: Ludian
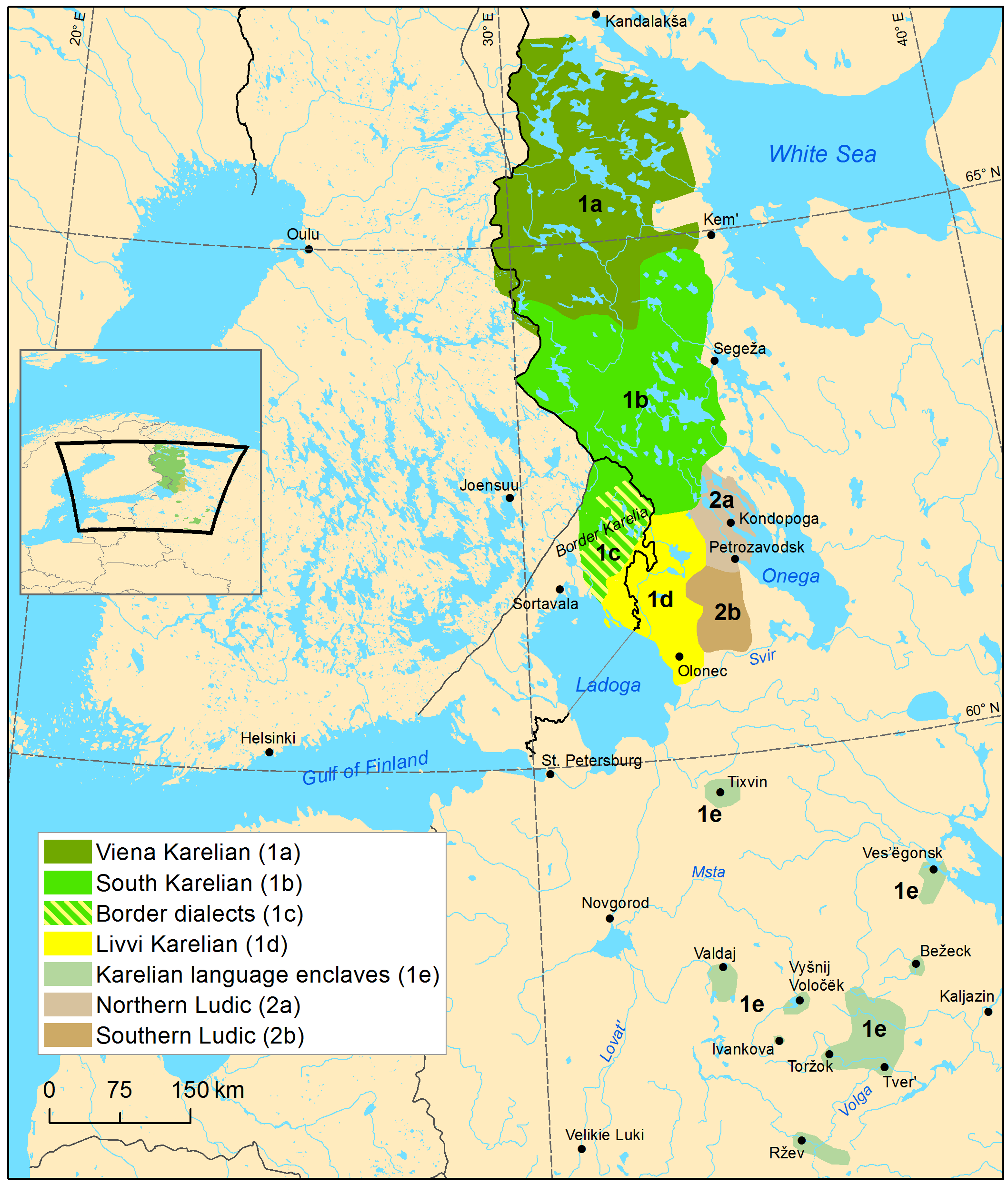
- Distribution of Karelian and Ludic at the beginning of the 20th century

- Lude is classified as Severely Endangered by the UNESCO Atlas of the World's Languages in Danger (2010)

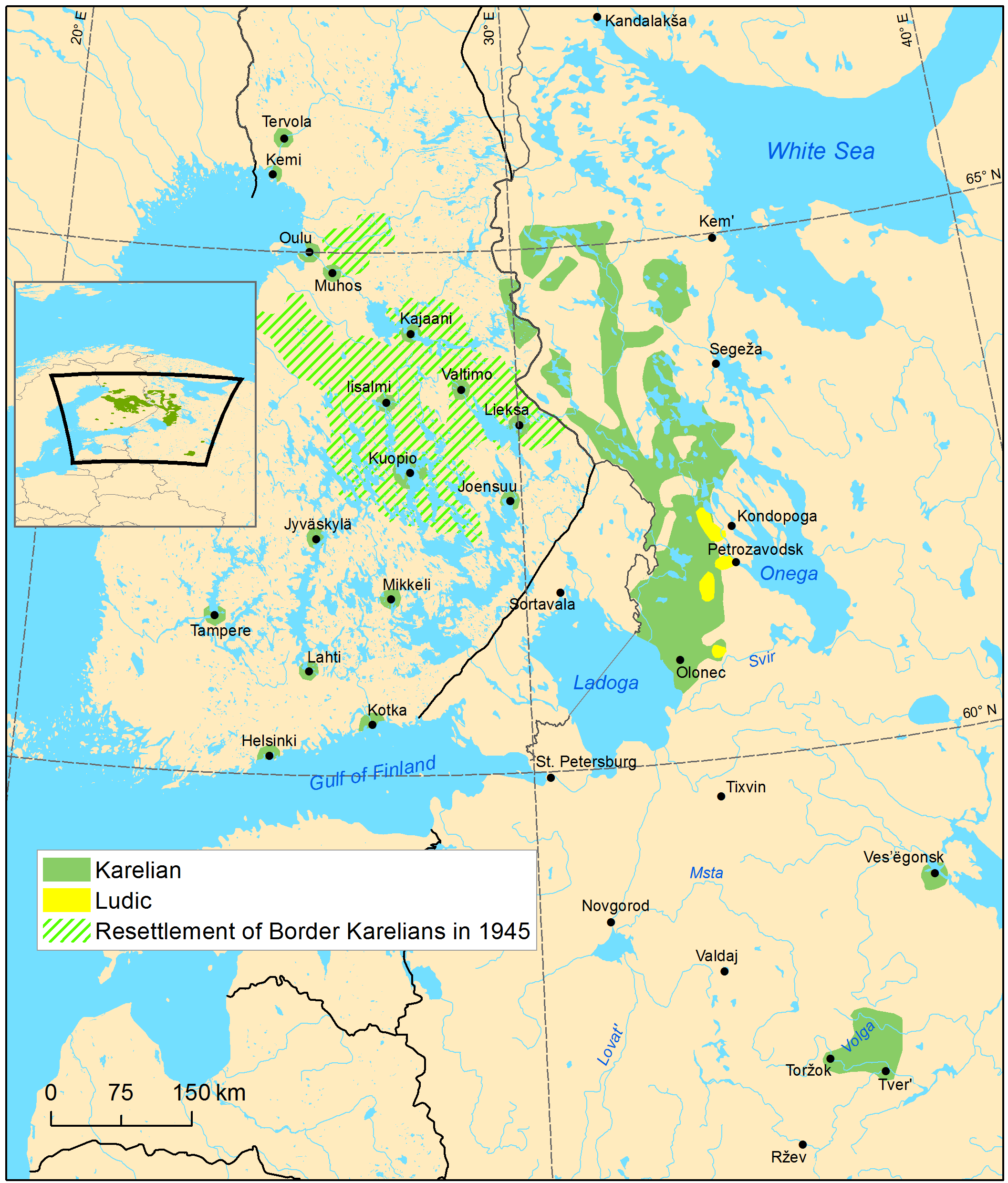
Current distribution of Karelian and Ludic

Ludic, Ludian, or Ludic Karelian (Luudi, Lyydi or lüüdi), is a Finnic language in the Uralic language family or a third supradialect of Karelian. It is transitional between the Olonets Karelian language and the Veps language. It is spoken by 300 Karelians in the Republic of Karelia in Russia, near the southwestern shore of Lake Onega, including a few children.

== Classification ==
Flag of Ludic Karelian

In the Finnish research tradition, Ludic has been considered a transitional dialect area between Karelian and Veps, while in the Russian research tradition it is, on ethnographic grounds, normally considered a dialect of Karelian. A status as an independent language has been proposed in recent times. Ludic is characterised by a specific mixture of Karelian-like traits (such as the diphthongisation of the Proto-Finnic non-open long vowels: e.g. *pää > piä 'head', *soo > suo 'swamp', contrast Veps pä, so) and Veps-like traits (such as an almost complete loss of consonant gradation). Like Veps, Ludic has also partially lost vowel harmony.

=== Dialects ===
Ludic comprises three main dialect groups:

- Ludic
  - Northern (Lake) Ludic, at the northwestern shores of Lake Onega
  - Central (River) Ludic, at settlements along river Shuya and near the city of Petrozavodsk
  - Kujärv (Forest) Ludic, in the Mikhaylovskoye (Kujärv) rural locality

The strongest Karelian resemblance is found in Northern Ludic, while the Kujärv dialect shares the most features with Veps.

== Phonology ==
=== Vowels ===
	Front		Back	
	unrounded	rounded	unrounded	rounded
Close	i	y		u
Mid	e	ø		o
Open	æ		ɑ	

- Vowel length may also be distinctive.

=== Consonants ===
		Labial		Alveolar		Palatal	Velar	Glottal
		plain	pal.	plain	pal.	Palatal	Velar	Glottal
Plosive	voiceless	p	(pʲ)	t	tʲ		k	
Plosive	voiced	b	(bʲ)	d	dʲ		ɡ	
Affricate	voiceless			t͡s		t͡ʃ		
Affricate	voiced					d͡ʒ		
Fricative	voiceless	(f)	(fʲ)	s	sʲ	ʃ	(x)	h
Fricative	voiced	v	(vʲ)	z	zʲ	ʒ		
Nasal		m	(mʲ)	n	nʲ			
Approximant				l	lʲ	j		
Rhotic				r	rʲ			

- Sounds /f, fʲ, bʲ, pʲ, vʲ, mʲ/ only occur in recent borrowings.
- /h/ can also be heard as a velar [x].
- /n/ is heard as velar [ŋ] when preceding velar consonants.
- /ɡ/ can be lenited as a fricative [ɣ] in intervocalic positions.

== Written language ==
The modern development of Ludic as a written language began during Perestroika in 1989, when the Petrozavodsk literary journal Carelia published the first poems in Ludic, based on the Kujärv dialect. At the same time, Lidia Potašova started teaching Ludic at the Kujärv school, using a Latin-based alphabet developed by Miikul Pahomov. The writing system was initially tested in literary texts before being applied to educational materials. In 1991, Potašova translated a Veps primer into Kujärv Ludic. Potašova and Pahomov later prepared the first proper Ludic primer ABC-kird' Kujärven lüüdin kielel (2003), which also included a grammar sketch and a small Kujärv Ludic dictionary. This was followed by the reader Tervheks! (2007) by Potašova and Pahomov.

Subsequent publications have used two slightly different written norms. One is the Kujärv-based literary variety employed in primers, readers, and children's literature, while the other is a broader "general Ludic" standard that draws on central and northern Ludic dialects in an attempt to reduce dialectal differences. Pahomov himself experimented with this broader norm in works such as Lüüdiland (2000), Ehtsluužb (2005), and Ukon bembel (2010), where both orthographic tendencies are represented.

In early Ludic publications the vowel /y/ was written either as Y, following the unified Karelian alphabet, or as Ü, by analogy with the Veps alphabet. This variation preceded the later standardization in primers and schoolbooks.

Majuscule Forms (also called uppercase or capital letters)
A	B	C	Č	D	E	F	G	H	I	J	K	L	M	N	O	P	R	S	Š	Z	Ž	T	U	V	Y (Ü)	Ä	Ö	ʹ
Minuscule Forms (also called lowercase or small letters)
a	b	c	č	d	e	f	g	h	i	j	k	l	m	n	o	p	r	s	š	z	ž	t	u	v	y (ü)	ä	ö	ʹ

== Phrases ==
- Ken sina oled? = Who are you?
- Mi tämä on? = What is this?
- Kudam teiš on Onni? = Which one of you is Onni?
- Mikš sina nagrad? = Why are you laughing?
- Kudam čuas on? = What time is it?
- Konz hyö tuldah kodih? = When are they coming home?
- Häin lähtöu huomei. = He/She leaves tomorrow.

== See also ==
- Karelian language

== Literature ==
- Barantsev, Aleksandr P. (1975), Fonologicheskiye sredstva lyudikovskoy rechi (Deskriptivnoye opisaniye) (in Russian), Leningrad; Nauka
- Pahomov, Miikul (2011), Kuujärven lyydiläistekstejä, Suomalais-Ugrilaisen Seuran Toimituksia, vol. 263, Helsinki: Suomalais-Ugrilainen Seura, ISBN 978-952-5667-32-5
- Pahomov, Miikul (2017). Lyydiläiskysymys: kansa vai heimo, kieli vai murre? (PDF) (PhD dissertation) (in Finnish). Helsingin yliopisto.
- Ojanen, Muusa (1985), Adjektiivikategoria venäläis-lyydiläisissä kontakteissa, Suomalais-Ugrilaisen Seuran Toimituksia, vol. 188, Helsinki / Joensuu: Suomalais-Ugrilainen Seura / Joensuun yliopisto, ISBN 951-9019-89-8
- Ojansuu, Heikki; Kujola, Juho; Kalima, Jalo; et al., eds. (1934), Lyydiläisiä kielennäytteitä, Suomalais-Ugrilaisen Seuran Toimituksia (in Finnish), vol. LXIX, Helsinki: Suomalais-Ugrilainen Seura
- Turunen, Aimo (1946), Lyydiläismurteiden äännehistoria. I. Konsonantit, Suomalais-Ugrilaisen Seuran Toimituksia (in Finnish), vol. LXXXIX, Helsinki: Suomalais-Ugrilainen Seura
- Turunen, Aimo (1950), Lyydiläismurteiden äännehistoria. II. Vokaalit, Suomalais-Ugrilaisen Seuran Toimituksia (in Finnish), vol. XCIX, Helsinki: Suomalais-Ugrilainen Seura
- Virtaranta, Pertti (1963), Lyydiläisiä tekstejä. I, Suomalais-Ugrilaisen Seuran Toimituksia (in Finnish), vol. 129, Helsinki: Suomalais-Ugrilainen Seura
- Virtaranta, Pertti (1963), Lyydiläisiä tekstejä. II, Suomalais-Ugrilaisen Seuran Toimituksia (in Finnish), vol. 130, Helsinki: Suomalais-Ugrilainen Seura
- Virtaranta, Pertti (1964), Lyydiläisiä tekstejä. III, Suomalais-Ugrilaisen Seuran Toimituksia (in Finnish), vol. 131, Helsinki: Suomalais-Ugrilainen Seura
- Virtaranta, Pertti (1976), Lyydiläisiä tekstejä. IV, Suomalais-Ugrilaisen Seuran Toimituksia (in Finnish), vol. 132, Helsinki: Suomalais-Ugrilainen Seura
- Virtaranta, Pertti (1984), Lyydiläisiä tekstejä. V, Suomalais-Ugrilaisen Seuran Toimituksia (in Finnish), vol. 165, Helsinki: Suomalais-Ugrilainen Seura, ISBN 951-9019-81-2
- Virtaranta, Pertti (1986), Haljärven lyydiläismurteen muoto-oppia, Suomalais-Ugrilaisen Seuran Toimituksia (in Finnish), vol. 190, Helsinki: Suomalais-Ugrilainen Seura, ISBN 951-9019-96-0
- Virtaranta, Pertti (1994), Lyydiläisiä tekstejä. VI. Anna Vasiljevna Tshesnakovan kerrontaa ja itkuvirsiä, Suomalais-Ugrilaisen Seuran Toimituksia (in Finnish), vol. 218, Helsinki: Suomalais-Ugrilainen Seura, ISBN 951-9403-72-8
