= Ge with macron =

Cyrillic letter formerly used in Karelian

- Г̄ г̄

Usage
- Writing system: Cyrillic
- Type: Alphabetic
- Sound values: [ɡ]

Ge with macron (Г̄ г̄; italics: Г̄ г̄) is a letter of the Cyrillic script. It was used in the Karelian language in 1887, where it represented the voiced velar stop /ɡ/, the same pronunciation of Г where it is commonly used.

== See also ==
- Cyrillic characters in Unicode
