= Delovoy Peterburg =

Business newspaper in Russia

- Type: Business newspaper
- Format: Tabloid
- Owner: Bonnier Group
- Publisher: Bonnier Business Press
- Editor-in-chief: Maxim Vasjukov
- Founded: 1993; 33 years ago
- Language: Russian
- Headquarters: Saint Petersburg, Russia
- ISSN: 1815-3305 (print); 1606-1829 (web)
- Website: www.dp.ru

Delovoy Peterburg (Russian: Деловой Петербург, lit. 'St. Petersburg Business') is a daily business newspaper published in Saint Petersburg, Russia. The paper has been in circulation since 1993.

== History and profile ==
Delovoy Peterburg was started in 1993. Its headquarters is in Saint Petersburg and the paper provides business- and finance-related news about the city and the region. The paper is published in tabloid format.

The owner of Delovoy Peterburg is Bonnier Group, and its publisher is Bonnier Business Press, ZAO, a subsidiary of the Bonnier Group. As of 2006 Andrey Ershov was the editor-in-chief. Maxim Vasjukov was appointed editor-in-chief on 8 December 2011.

In 2011 Delovoy Peterburg was awarded by WAN/IFRA in the editorial category for its news service, namely DPVkontakte, within a social media site.

In 2005 Delovoy Peterburg sold 23,000 copies. In 2010, the circulation of the daily rose to 24,000 copies. At the end of 2011 the paper had a circulation of 20,400 copies.

== See also ==
- List of newspapers in Russia
