= Głos Kolejarzy Ewakuowanych — Golos Evakuirovannykh Zheleznodorozhnikov =

Moscow newspaper (1917–1918)

- Type: Irregular
- Editor: Henryk Jastrzębowski, Adolf Siewnicki
- Founded: October 10, 1917
- Ceased publication: March 13, 1918
- Political alignment: Socialism
- Headquarters: 12, Bolshaya Lubyanka Street
- City: Moscow
- Country: Russia

Głos Kolejarzy Ewakuowanych — Golos Evakuirovannykh Zheleznodorozhnikov ('Voice of the Evacuated Railway Workers', Russian: Голос эвакуированных железнодорожников) was a bilingual, Polish and Russian-language newspaper published in Moscow in the years 1917–1918, as the organ of the Central Executive Bureau of Evacuated Railway Workers.

In the midst of World War I, some 40,000 railway workers were evacuated from Congress Poland in 1915 and at the time of the Russian Revolutions of 1917 would stay in cities like Moscow, Petrograd, Gatchina, Smolensk, Vitebsk, Rzhev, Kharkov and Yekaterinoslav. Głos Kolejarzy Ewakuowanych — Golos Evakuirovannykh Zheleznodorozhnikov was a bilingual Polish and Russian-language publication. Only three issues were published: 27 September [O.S. 10 October] 1917, 28 October [O.S. 11 November] 1917, and 28 February [O.S. 13 March] 1918. The editor and publisher of the first and second issues was Henryk Jastrzębowski, chairman of the Polish section of Vikzhel. Niedźwiedzki is also mentioned as an editor alongside Jastrzębowski for the first issue. The third issue, published following the victory of the October Revolution, was edited by Adolf Siewnicki, a member of the Social Democracy of the Kingdom of Poland and Lithuania (SDKPiL). The office of the publication was located on 12, Bolshaya Lubyanka Street. Copies were sold for 20 kopeks.

The publication had no journalistic ambitions and was solely focused on the program and activities of the All-Russian Union of Evacuated Railway Workers. Głos Kolejarzy Ewakuowanych — Golos Evakuirovannykh Zheleznodorozhnikov promoted the participation of railway workers of all nationalities in the All-Russian trade union organization for the sake of the defense of the Revolution, and denounced the separatism of Polish railway workers unions (in particular the Union of Polish Employees of the Warsaw-Vienna Railway). The SDKPiL organ Trybuna hailed the launch of Głos Kolejarzy Ewakuowanych — Golos Evakuirovannykh Zheleznodorozhnikov, expressing hope that the publication would become "a sower of class consciousness".

== See also ==
- List of newspapers in Russia
