= Oma Mua =

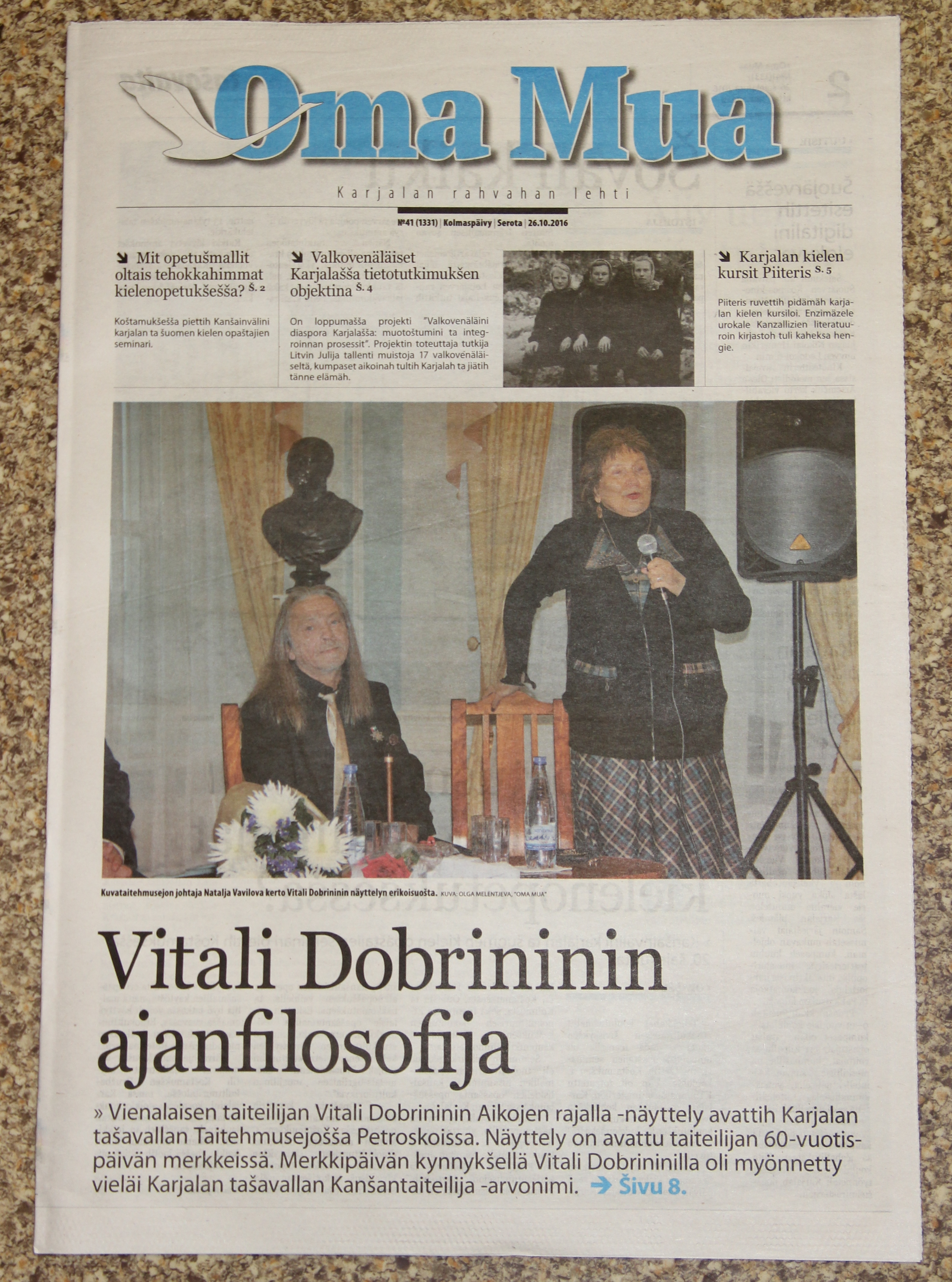
- Type: Weekly newspaper
- Owner(s): OmaMedia
- Founder(s): Union of Karelian People
- Publisher: Periodika
- General manager: Ol'ga Melentjeva
- Founded: 1990
- Language: North Karelian and Livvi-Karelian
- Headquarters: Petrozavodsk, Republic of Karelia
- Country: Russia
- Circulation: (as of 1990)
- Website: Official website

Oma Mua (transl. Own Land) is a Karelian-language newspaper published in Petrozavodsk, Republic of Karelia. The newspaper is owned by OmaMedia, and was merged together with Vienan Karjala in 2014.

First issue was published in 1990 by Periodika and the newspaper generally tells about events happening in the Republic of Karelia, such as politics, Karelian culture and language along with economics and sports. The newspaper was created by the Union of Karelian People and its publisher is Periodika.

== See also ==
- Karjalan Sanomat
- Vienan Karjala
