= Bible translations into Karelian =

The Karelian language is a Baltic Finnic language spoken mostly in the Republic of Karelia (Russia) and Finland. The earliest book of the Bible to be translated in Karelian dates to the 19th century, however the Lord's Prayer is known to have been translated already in the 16th century into Karelian. There have been recently new efforts to create translations into the Karelian language, and there exists two full New Testament translations in Karelian: "Uuzi Sana" in Livvi-Karelian and "Uuši Šana" in Northern Karelian.

== History ==
The Lord's Prayer was already translated into Karelian already in the 16th century, however the earliest translation of a whole book of the Bible into Karelian comes from 1820, when the Gospel of Matthew was translated into Karelian in the Cyrillic script. This translation was made with the assistance of the Archbishop of Ter and Kashin, and the priest Grigory Vvedensky who had learned the Karelian language. This translation represents Tver Karelian, which descents from South Karelian.

Following the dissolution of the Soviet Union, efforts have been made to translate the entirety of the Bible into Karelian. These efforts began in the 1990s, which resulted in the creation of the Children's Bible (1995), the New Testament (Uuzi sana) in Livvi Karelian (2003) and the Psalms in Livvi-Karelian (2007). These translations were made through the efforts of the Helsinki Institute for Bible Translation, alongside experts in the Karelian language such as Zinaida Dubinina, Nina Zaitseva and Raisa Remshueva. In 2008, the Livvi-Karelian translation was also made into an audiobook, since many Karelians were not able to read the Latin Alphabet used in the written Karelian language. Later in 2011, a translation of the New Testament (Uuši Šana) was also made in the White Karelian dialect. This translation was the first Biblical translation into North Karelian, and it was translated by a group of Finnish Karelian experts.
