= Ge with cedilla =

Cyrillic letter formerly used in Karelian, Dargin and Lezgin

- Г̧ г̧

Usage
- Writing system: Cyrillic
- Type: Alphabetic

Ge with cedilla (Г̧ г̧; italics: Г̧ г̧) is an old letter of the Cyrillic script. It is formed from the Cyrillic Letter Г г with a cedilla.

Ge with cedilla was used in the Karelian language in the 1820s, Dargin and in the Lezgin alphabet of 1911.

== See also ==
- Cyrillic characters in Unicode
