= Tyumenskaya oblastʹ segodnya =

Daily newspaper in Russia

- Type: Daily newspaper
- Founder: Governor of Tyumen Oblast
- Founded: 28 October 1998
- Headquarters: Tyumen, Respubliki str., 62, app. 450
- Website: TumenToday.ru

Tyumenskaya oblastʹ segodnya is a daily Russian newspaper. It is distributed in the Tyumen Region, Khanty-Mansi Autonomous Okrug and Yamalo-Nenets Autonomous Okrug. The newspaper is an official newspaper of the Government of the Tyumen Region.

== History ==
Prior to the establishment of Tyumenskaya Pravda Segodnya, Tyumenskaya Pravda was the largest newspaper in the region. It was jointly controlled by the Tyumen government along with the Khanty-Mansi and Yamalo-Nenets Autonomous Okrugs. During a conflict regarding the degree of the Okrugs' autonomy, Tyumenskaya Pravda suffered financial hardship and the Tyumen governor, Leonid Roketsky, proposed to establish an outlet not subordinate to the Okrugs' leadership. Shortly after, Tyumenskaya Pravda Segodnya was launched, led by former employees of Tyumenskaya Pravda.

The first issue was published in October 1998. Initially the newspaper was published thrice a week. Starting from 2000, daily with exceptions for weekends. The outlet was renamed to Tyumenskaya oblastʹ segodnya in 2002. In 1998, it had 5,000 subscribers and a circulation of 10,000. The latter grew to 100,000 in 2008. The outlet was the most popular daily newspaper of the region, read by 9% of residents.

In 2020, Skorbenko, who was the chief editor since 2002, was fired.

== Editors in Chief ==
- Michail Semenovich Gorbachev (1998–2001)
- Raisa Petrovna Kovdenko (2001–2002)
- Alexander Nickolaevich Skorbenko (from 7 February 2002—2020)
