= Čičiliusku =

Russian puppet theatre company

Čičiliusku (Karelian for viviparous lizard) is a puppet theatre company from the Republic of Karelia in Russia. The company performs in the Karelian language. The company was founded in 2005 at the initiative of Pekka Zaikov, who at the time was the head of the Department of the Karelian and Veps languages. Amongst those who founded the company were teachers, students and alumni of the Faculty of Baltic Finnic languages of the Petrozavodsk State University. The Karelian folk theater was created in order to preserve the Karelian national intangible culture, popularize the Karelian language among children and youth language, introducing the younger generation to ethnocultural activities. A year later the company performed their first play, Kuin hukka vasikalla muamona oli ('When the Wolf Stood in for the Calf's Mother').

Although Čičiliusku performs for all kinds of audiences both in their home state and abroad, they want to target Karelian speaking people in the peripheral areas of Karelia, especially the youth, and inspire them to be more active in the use of the Karelian language. The shows are free, although the company hopes that the spectators would provide them with financial support, each according to his or her means.

The members of the Čičiliusku company, ca. 15 persons, represent the same groups as those who founded the company. The members of the company are Karelian language and Karelian political activists who are active in the association Nuori Karjala ('Young Karelia') and the political movement Karjalan rahvahan liitto ('Karelian People's Union'). Čičiliusku is one of the most successful projects of Nuori Karjala.

The company have their rehearsals in the Cultural Centre of the Karelian Republic, and the centre provides them with financial support. They also receive support from the Karelian Ministry of Culture.

The head of the company is Natal'ya Golubovskaya, who has been a member ever since the company was founded. The props and the puppets are supplied by Marina Zlenko and Boris Kudryavcev, while Oleg Gureyev is in charge of the music.

The company performs in the Livvi and the North Karelian languages, both languages being used in each performance. The company does not perform in the Central Karelian language (the latter being the same language variant as Tver Karelian). The plays consist of well-known folk stories and of various life situations that are familiar to all people. The company strives to present the plays in such a way that enables even those with little or no knowledge of Karelian to follow them. The puppets make it easier for the audience to grasp the essence of the plays.

Čičiliusku visited Finland during 10–17 November 2012, and performed two plays, Canine Kalevala, based on the book of the same title by the Finnish cartoonist and author Mauri Kunnas, and the aforementioned Kuin hukka vasikalla muamona oli ('When the Wolf Stood in for the Calf's Mother'). The Finnish premiere of Canine Kalevala was in Sastamala on 10 November 2012, and a repeat of the play was seen in Tampere the following day. The tour ended in Helsinki on 17 November.

In the repertoire - Performances: "How a wolf was a mother to a calf", "Blue important woman", "Crow", "Samovar", "Koirien Kalevala", "I am a Chicken, you are a Chicken", "How women divided a man".

Canine Kalevala is the first Kalevala related work to have been published in the North Karelian language, the language of the area from which the bulk of the Kalevala was collected by Elias Lönnrot. It was translated by Nadezhda Lutokhina, and it was published by Karjalan Sivistysseura ('Society for the Promotion of the Karelian Culture') in 2010.
