= Novgorod (newspaper) =

Novgorod (Russian: "Новгород") is a weekly newspaper published in Veliky Novgorod, Russia. It was founded on October 19, 1990. The newspaper comes out on Thursdays and has a circulation of 103,000.

As of 2021, the editor-in-chief is Людмила Соколова.
