= Vazhinka =

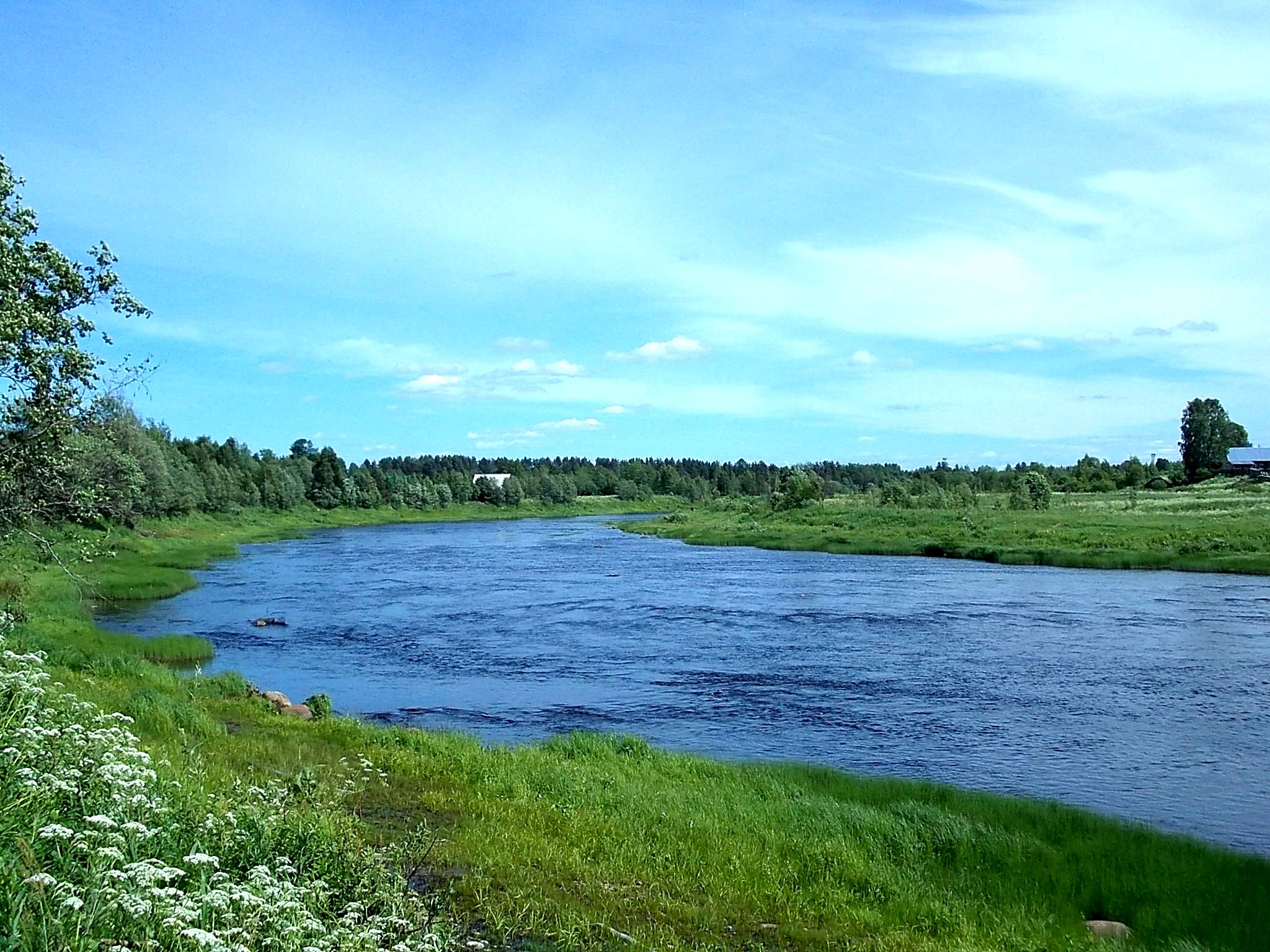
- Native name: Важинка (Russian)

Location
- Country: Russia

Physical characteristics
- Mouth: Svir
  - coordinates: 60°57′35″N 34°01′02″E
- Length: 123 km (76 mi)
- Basin size: 2,200 km^{2} (850 sq mi)

Basin features
- Progression: Svir→ Lake Ladoga→ Neva→ Gulf of Finland

The Vazhinka (Russian: Важинка) is a river in Prionezhsky and Pryazhinsky Districts of the Republic of Karelia and in Podporozhsky District of Leningrad Oblast, Russia, a right tributary of the Svir. The urban-type settlement of Vazhiny is located in its mouth. It is 123 kilometres (76 mi) long, and the area of its basin 2,200 square kilometres (850 sq mi). The principal tributary of the Vazhinka is the Muzhala (left).

The source of the Vazhinka is located in the western part of Prionezhsky District. The river flows south, enters Pryazhinsky District, accepts the Tuksha from the right, and enters Leningrad Oblast. In the Republic of Karelia, the valley of the Vazhinka is almost unpopulated, with the exception of villages Verkhniye Vazhiny and Kashkany. It further turns east, turns south again, and accepts the Chelma from the left, close to its mouth.

The drainage basin of the Vazhinka includes the south of Pryazhinsky District, the northwest of Podporozhsky District, and minor areas in the west of Prionezhsky District. A big lake in the area, Lake Vachozero, is located in the drainage basin of the Vazhinka.
