= Finno-Ugrian Society =

Finnish learned society

Finno-Ugrian Society (French: Société finno-ougrienne, Finnish: Suomalais-Ugrilainen Seura) is a Finnish learned society, dedicated to the study of Uralic and Altaic languages. It was founded in Helsinki in 1883 by the proposal of professor Otto Donner.

The society publishes several academic journals, including:

- Mémoires de la Société Finno-Ougrienne (278 volumes as of December 2024)
- Finnisch-ugrische Forschungen (69 volumes as of December 2024)
- Journal de la Société Finno-Ougrienne (99 volumes as of December 2024).
