= Vecherniy Murmansk =

Newspaper in Murmansk, Russia

Vecherniy Murmansk (Russian: "Вечерний Мурманск" ~ The Evening Murmansk) is an evening newspaper published in Murmansk, Russia. It was founded by Murmansk Administrative center on 2 January 1991. It is published on a daily basis.
