= The Kazan Herald =

Russian English-language newspaper

- Type: Monthly newspaper
- Publisher: The Kazan Herald Publishing Company
- Editor-in-chief: Rustem Yunusov
- Founded: May 2010
- Ceased publication: April 2013
- Language: English
- Headquarters: Kazan, Tatar Republic
- Website: www.thekazanherald.ru

The Kazan Herald (Rus.: Казанский Вестник, Tat.: Казан Мөхбире) was the only English-language online newspaper published in Kazan, the capital of Tatarstan, Russia. It was also distributed free of charge in tourism and business locations in Kazan and other cities around the Republic of Tatarstan, including Yelabuga, Nizhnekamsk, and Naberezhnye Chelny.

== History ==
Founded in May 2010, the newspaper aimed to provide English-language summaries of local news developments within Tatarstan from a foreign viewpoint and also covered local business and sports developments. It served as a voice for Kazan's expatriate community and included sections on foreign opinions of Tatarstan and its politics as well as news on expatriate life. The Kazan Herald maintained a regularly updated website and released a print version once a month.

In November 2010, The Kazan Herald was presented with an award for English-language media at the Tatarstan Republican Youth Forum, as a part of the Republic's growing interest in improving English-language proficiency before Kazan's hosting of the Universiade in 2013.

Publication of The Kazan Herald ceased in April 2013. Its license was revoked in early 2015. According to the co-founder and former editor-in-chief of the publication, Rustem Yunusov, a lack of funds led to the closure of both the print and the online version of the magazine.

== See also ==
- List of newspapers in Russia
- Media of Russia
