= Vecherniy Stavropol =

Newspaper in Stavropol, Russia

Vecherniy Stavropol (Russian: Вечерний Ставрополь; The Evening Stavropol) is a newspaper published in Stavropol, Russia since 1989. It comes out five days a week, Tuesday through Saturday.

The circulation, as of 2007, is 25,473, except on Thursday, when it is 31,571. The editor-in-chief, as of 2007, is Mr. Mikhail Y. Vasilenko.
