= Vazhiny =

Vazhiny Важины
- Urban-type settlement
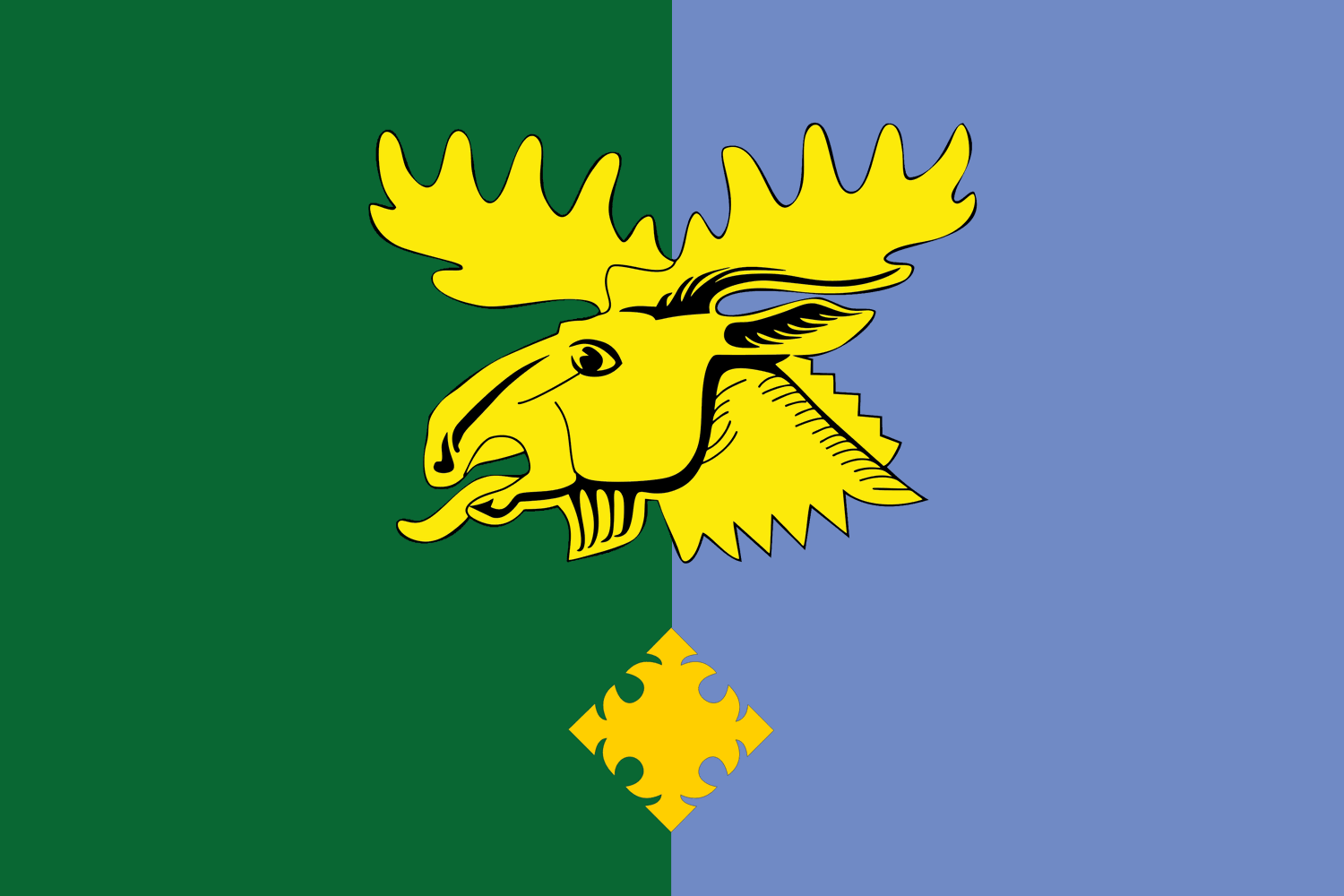
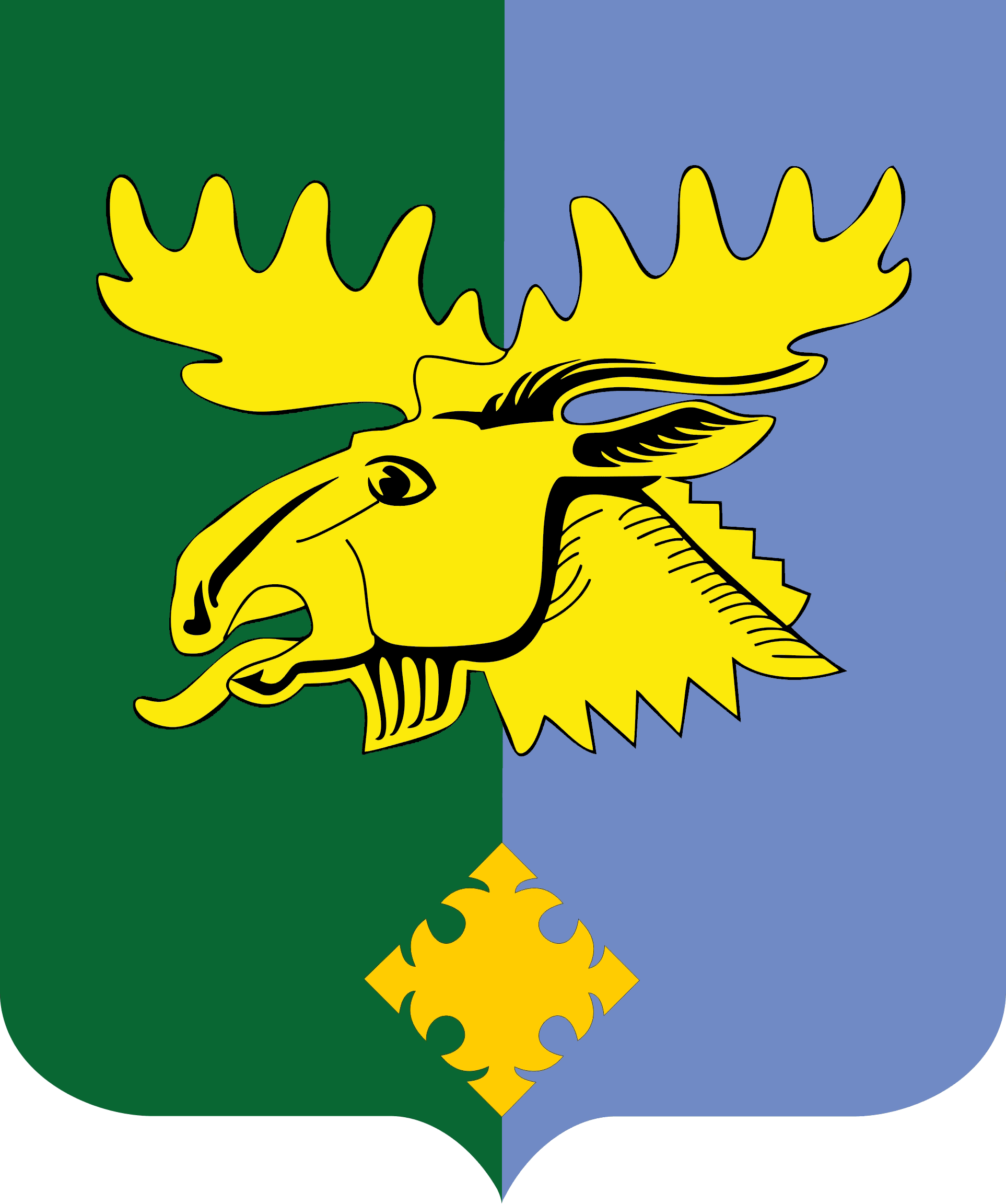
- Flag Coat of arms
- Interactive map of Vazhiny
- Location of Vazhiny Vazhiny (Leningrad Oblast)
- Coordinates: 60°57′51″N 34°01′30″E
- Country: Russia
- Federal subject: Leningrad Oblast
- Administrative district: Podporozhsky District
- Urban-type settlement status since: 1970

Population (2010 Census)
  - Total: 2,754
  - Estimate (2024): 2,348 (−14.7%)

Municipal status
  - Municipal district: Podporozhsky Municipal District
  - Urban settlement: Vazhinskoye Urban Settlement
  - Capital of: Vazhinskoye Urban Settlement
- Time zone: UTC+3 (MSK)
- Postal code: 187742
- OKTMO ID: 41636154051

Vazhiny (Russian: Важины) is an urban locality (an urban-type settlement) in Podporozhsky District of Leningrad Oblast, Russia, located on the right bank of the Svir River at the mouth of the Vazhinka River, several kilometers northwest of the town of Podporozhye. Municipally, it is incorporated as Vazhinskoye Urban Settlement, one of the four urban settlements in the district. Population: 2,754 (2010 census); 2,941 (2002 census); 3,956 (1989 Soviet census).

== History ==
Vazhiny was first mentioned in the 16th century as Vazhinsky Pogost, a settlement of Novgorodians. The area was relatively unpopulated until the 18th century, when the Mariinsky Canal System, which included the Svir River, was opened. In the 19th century, the extensive timber logging started, and the selo of Vazhiny was formally established in 1900, to serve logging, timber trade, and timber transport along the Svir. At the time, Vazhiny was a part of Olonetsky Uyezd of Olonets Governorate. In 1922, Olonets Governorate was abolished, and Olonetsky Uyezd was abolished as well. Vazhiny was transferred into Lodeynopolsky Uyezd of Petrograd Governorate (later Leningrad Oblast).

On August 1, 1927, the uyezds in Leningrad Oblast were abolished, and Podporozhsky District with the administrative center in Podporozhye was established. It was a part of Lodeynoye Pole Okrug of Leningrad Oblast and included areas formerly belonging to Lodeynopolsky Uyezd. Vazhiny became a part of the district. In 1932, the administrative center of the district was moved to Vazhiny, due to the construction of the Upper Svir Hydroelectric Station, but on September 11, 1938 the district center was moved back to Podroporozhye. Between September 1941 and July 1944, during World War II, Vazhiny was occupied by Finnish troops. In 1970, Vazhiny was granted urban-type settlement status.

== Economy ==
=== Industry ===
The economy of Vazhiny is based on timber industry.

=== Transportation ===
Vazhiny is connected by road with Podporozhye and have an access to a paved road connecting Lodeynoye Pole with Vytegra, as well as to the road connecting Podporozhye and Olonets.

The Svir River is navigable and is a part of the Volga–Baltic Waterway, connecting the basins of the Volga and the Neva Rivers. There is regular cruise and cargo traffic along the waterway.

== Culture and recreation ==
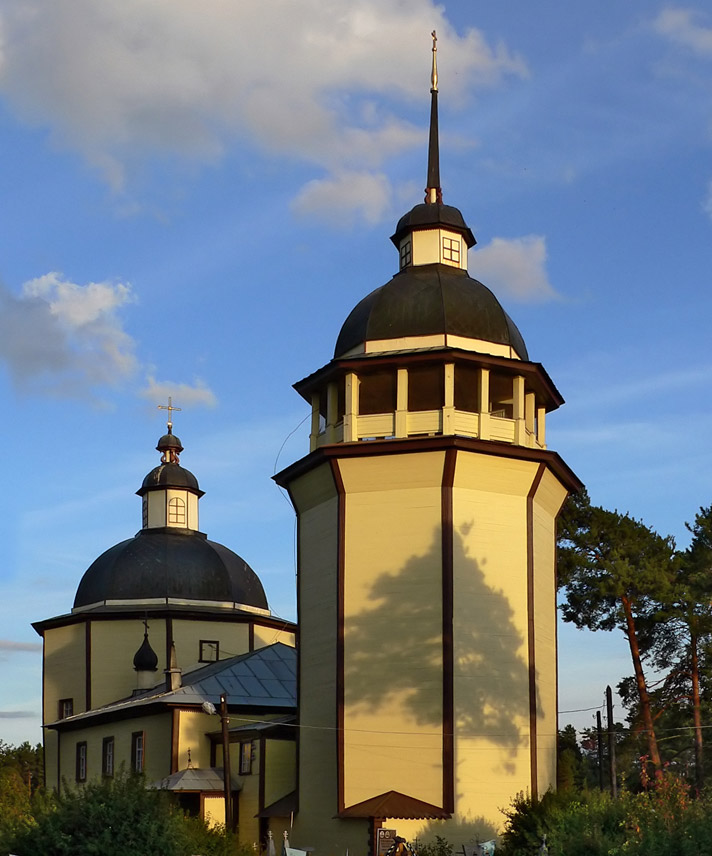
The Resurrection Church

Vazhiny is a part of so-called Podporozhye Ring, which includes some of the best samples of wooden ecclesiastical architecture in Leningrad Oblast. The settlement contains the wooden Resurrection Church (1630).
