= Sovetsky Sakhalin =

Sovetskiy Sakhalin (Russian: Советский Сахалин ~ Soviet Sakhalin) is a black-and-white newspaper published in Yuzhno-Sakhalinsk, Russia. It was founded on May 1, 1925. It is distributed on Sakhalin and in the Kuril Islands and comes out four days a week, Tuesday through Friday.

As of 2007, 12,303 copies are distributed, 95 percent of which go out to subscribers. The editor is Vladimir M. Sorochan.
