= Vecherniy Krasnoyarsk =

Newspaper in Krasnoyarsk, Russia

Vecherniy Krasnoyarsk (Russian: "Вечерний Красноярск" ~ The Evening Krasnoyarsk) was a weekly newspaper published in Krasnoyarsk, Russia from 1989 to 2010. It came out on Wednesdays. The publication covered political, economic, social and cultural topics. The newspaper's task was to form a detailed objective picture of life in Krasnoyarsk and Krasnoyarsk Krai, as well as prompt coverage of the most significant city and regional events. It published official documents of the Krasnoyarsk Krai administration.

As of January 9, 2005, the circulation was 23,000. In 2007, the editor-in-chief was Yevgeniya Leontyeva.

In 2011 the newspaper was suspended due to financial problems. According to editor-in-chief at the time Ekaterina Yusma, the columnists who used to work at the organization have moved to the website Newslab.ru. In its final years, the newspaper had a circulation of 19,000.
