= The St. Petersburg Times (Russia) =

Defunct Russian newspaper

- Type: Weekly newspaper
- Format: Broadsheet
- Owner: Sanoma Oyj
- Publisher: Sanoma Oyj
- Founded: 1993
- Ceased publication: 2014
- Political alignment: None
- Language: English
- Headquarters: Saint Petersburg
- Circulation: 35,000
- Sister newspapers: The Moscow Times; The Kazan Herald
- Website: sptimes.ru

The St. Petersburg Times was a weekly newspaper issued in St. Petersburg, Russia. It served the expatriate community, tourists, and Russians interested in an international perspective on local and world affairs. Publication began in May 1993, and was suspended on 24 December 2014. The editorial staff tweeted that the situation was connected with the economic crisis in Russia and current legislative environment.

The newspaper, and its sister The Moscow Times, which continues to be published, were published by Finnish Sanoma Oyj, publisher of Helsingin Sanomat in Helsinki.

== History ==
The newspaper was founded by New Zealand writer Lloyd Donaldson (7 November 1963 – 26 June 2010) and Russian novice entrepreneur Gregory Kunis. In 1992, they founded the publishing house Cornerstone. In May 1993 the publishing house has released the first issue of the newspaper The St. Petersburg Press. The newspaper adopted its later name in 1996, when it was sold to Sanoma.

The paper temporarily suspended publication after December 2014 due to worsening economic conditions in Russia and the staff were given paid leave in January 2015. The last editor, Simon Patterson, said that the website would continue to function. The website stayed up until March 2015, after which it was usurped by The Moscow Times.
