= Karelian language =

Finnic language of Karelia, in Russia and Finland

Karelian
- karjala, karjalan kieli kard'al, kard'alan kiel' kariela, karielan kieli
- Native to: Russia, Finland
- Region: Republic of Karelia, Tver Oblast (Tver Karelia)
- Ethnicity: Karelians
- Native speakers: 9000 native speakers, 14,000 total (Russia) (2020); 11,000 fluent speakers, 30,000 with some knowledge (Finland)
- Language family: Uralic: Finnic; Northern Finnic; Ladogan?; Karelian
- Dialects: Livvi; Karelian proper; Bjarmian †
- Writing system: Latin (Karelian alphabet); Cyrillic (in the past, 1820–1940, before the Latin script was officially adopted in 1989)

Official status
- Recognised minority language in: Finland; Russia: Republic of Karelia

Language codes
- ISO 639-2: krl
- ISO 639-3: krl
- Glottolog: kare1335
- ELP: Karelian
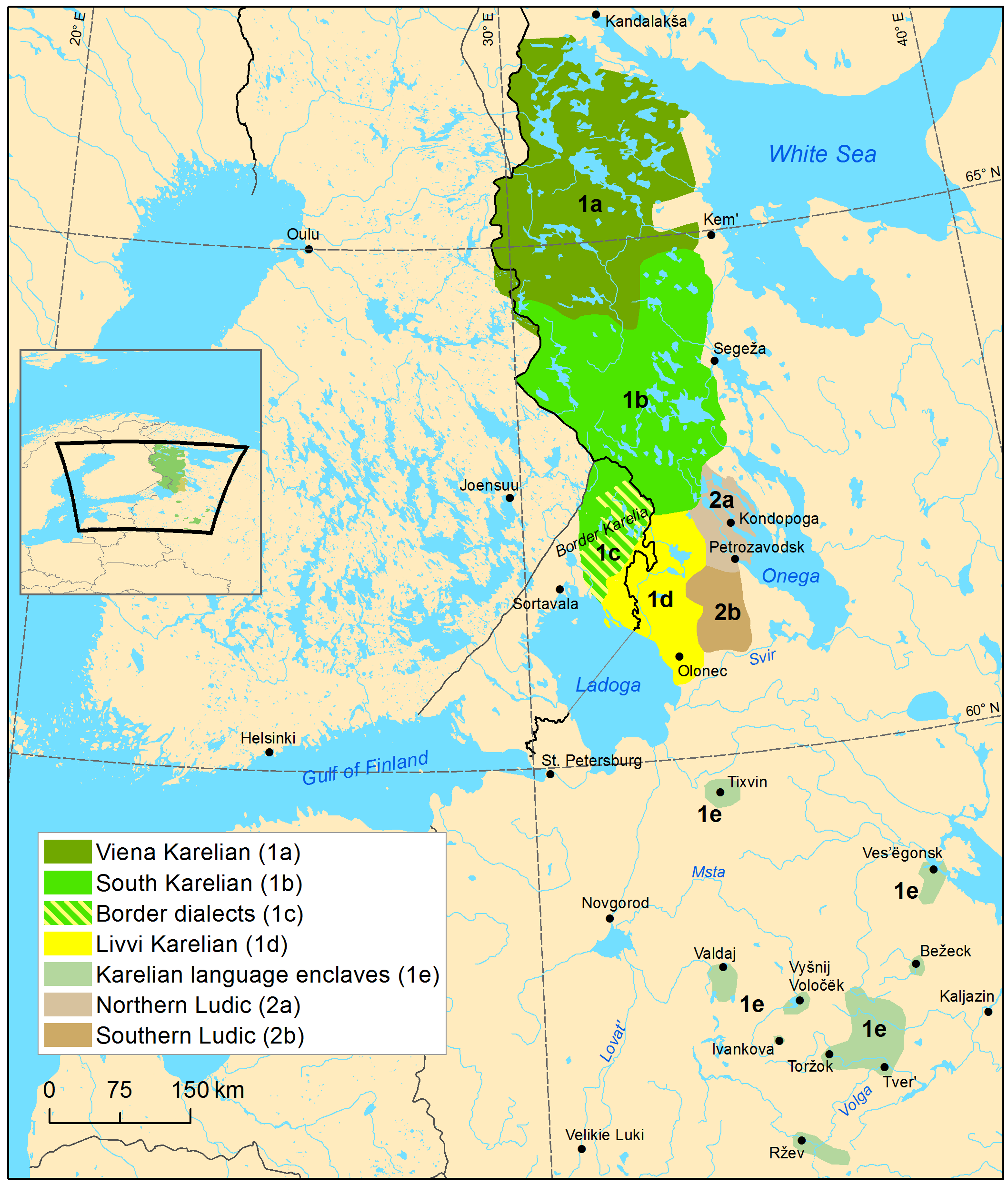
- Distribution of Karelian and Ludic at the beginning of the 20th century

- Karelian is classified as Definitively Endangered by the UNESCO Atlas of the World's Languages in Danger.

- People: Karelians
- Language: Karelian; Livvi-Karelian
- Country: Karelia

Karelian or East Karelian (/kəˈriːliən, kəˈriːljən/; Karelian Proper and Livvi-Karelian: karjala, karjalan kieli; Ludian: kard'al, kard'alan kiel'; Tver Karelian: kariela, karielan kieli) is a Finnic language spoken mainly by the Karelian people in the Russian Republic of Karelia. Linguistically, Karelian is closely related to the Finnish dialects spoken in eastern Finland, and some Finnish linguists have even classified Karelian as a dialect of Finnish, but nowadays it is widely considered a separate language. Karelian is not to be confused with the Southeastern dialects of Finnish, which are also referred to as karjalaismurteet ("Karelian dialects") in Finland. In the Russian 2020–2021 census, around 9,000 people spoke Karelian natively, but around 14,000 said they were able to speak the language. There are around 11,000 speakers of Karelian in Finland, and around 30,000 people in Finland have at least some knowledge of Karelian.

The Karelian language is a group of two supradialects. The two supradialects are Karelian Proper (which comprises Northern Karelian and South Karelian (including the Tver enclave dialects)) and Olonets Karelian (Livvi Karelian). The Ludic language is sometimes considered one more dialect of Karelian, sometimes a separate language. There is no single standard Karelian language, so each writer writes in Karelian according to their own dialectal form. All variants are written with the Latin-based Karelian alphabet, though the Cyrillic script has been used in the past.

Based upon toponymic and historical evidence, a form of Karelian was also spoken among the extinct Bjarmians in the 15th century.

== Classification ==
Karelian is a Finnic language from the Uralic language family, and is closely related to Finnish. Finnish and Karelian have common ancestry in the Proto-Karelian language spoken in the coast of Lake Ladoga in the Iron Age, and Karelian forms a dialect continuum with the Eastern dialects of Finnish. Earlier, some Finnish linguists classified Karelian as a dialect of Finnish, sometimes known in older Finnish literature as Raja-Karjalan murteet ('Border Karelian dialects'), but today Karelian is seen as a distinct language. Besides Karelian and Finnish, the Finnic subgroup also includes Estonian and some minority languages spoken around the Baltic Sea.

== Usage ==
Karelian is a language in danger of extinction, with 45% of speakers being over 65 years old and with around 1% of speakers being under 15 years of age. The language is also not understood or spoken at all by a majority of the people in the Republic of Karelia, with around 43% of people using the language.

== Geographic distribution ==
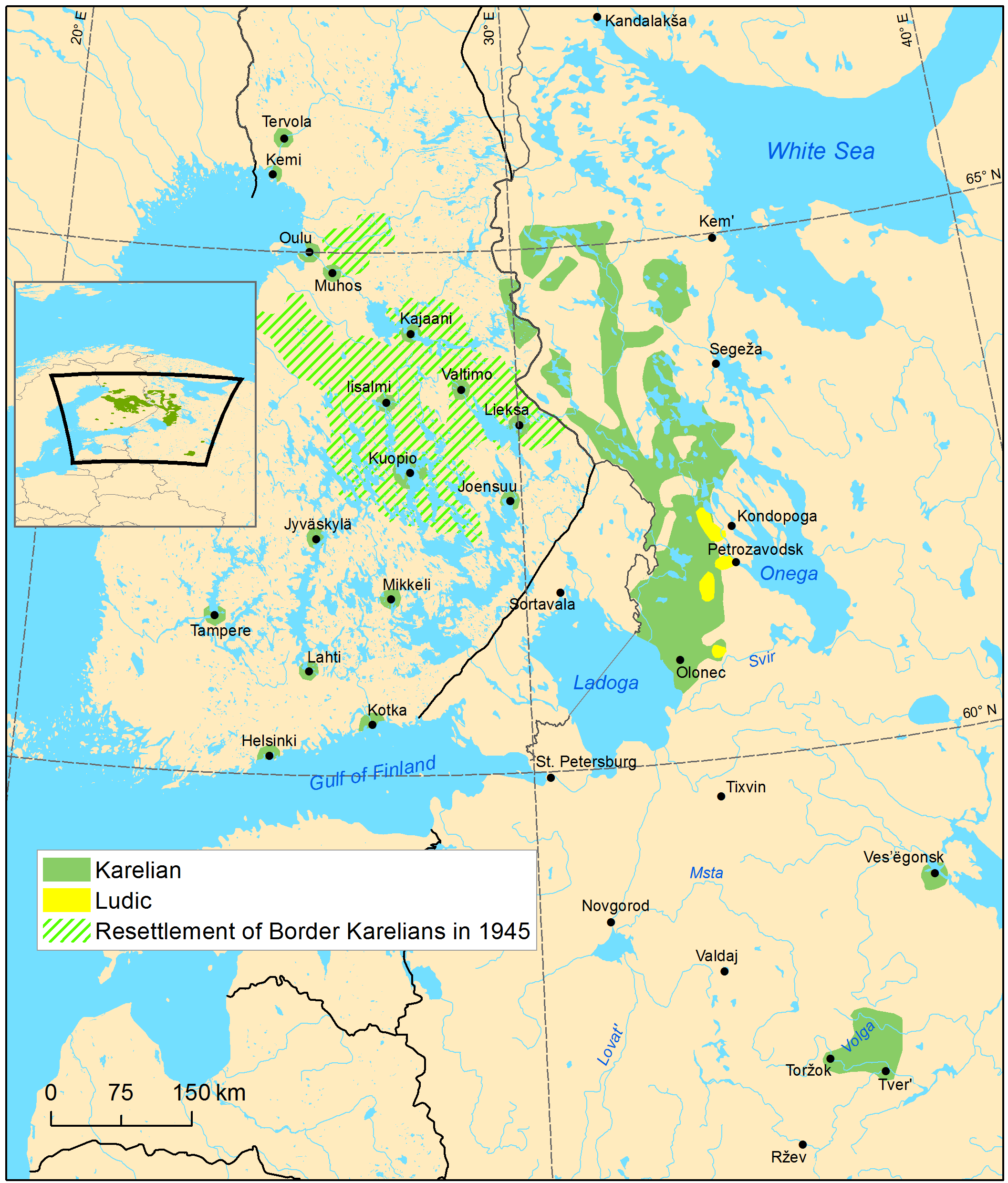
Current distribution of Karelian and Ludic

In Russia, Karelian is spoken by about 13,880 people (2020), mainly in the Republic of Karelia, although notable Karelian-speaking communities can also be found in the Tver region (Tver Oblast) northwest of Moscow. Previously, it was estimated that there were 5,000 speakers in Finland, mainly belonging to the older generations, but more recent estimates have put the number of people with even slight knowledge of the language at 30,000. Due to post-World War II mobility and internal migration, Karelians now live scattered throughout Finland, and Karelian is no longer spoken as a local community language.

=== Official status ===
In the Republic of Karelia, Karelian has official status as a minority language, and since the late 1990s there have been moves to pass special language legislation, which would give Karelian an official status on par with Russian. Karelians in Tver Oblast have a national-cultural autonomy which guarantees the use of the Karelian language in schools and mass media. In Finland, Karelian has official status as a non-regional national minority language within the framework of the European Charter for Regional or Minority Languages.

=== Supradialects and dialects ===
The Karelian language has two main varieties, which can be considered as supradialects or separate languages: Karelian Proper, which comprises Northern Karelian and South Karelian (including the Tver enclave dialects); and Olonets Karelian. These varieties constitute a continuum of dialects, the ends of which are no longer mutually intelligible. Varieties can be further divided into individual dialects:

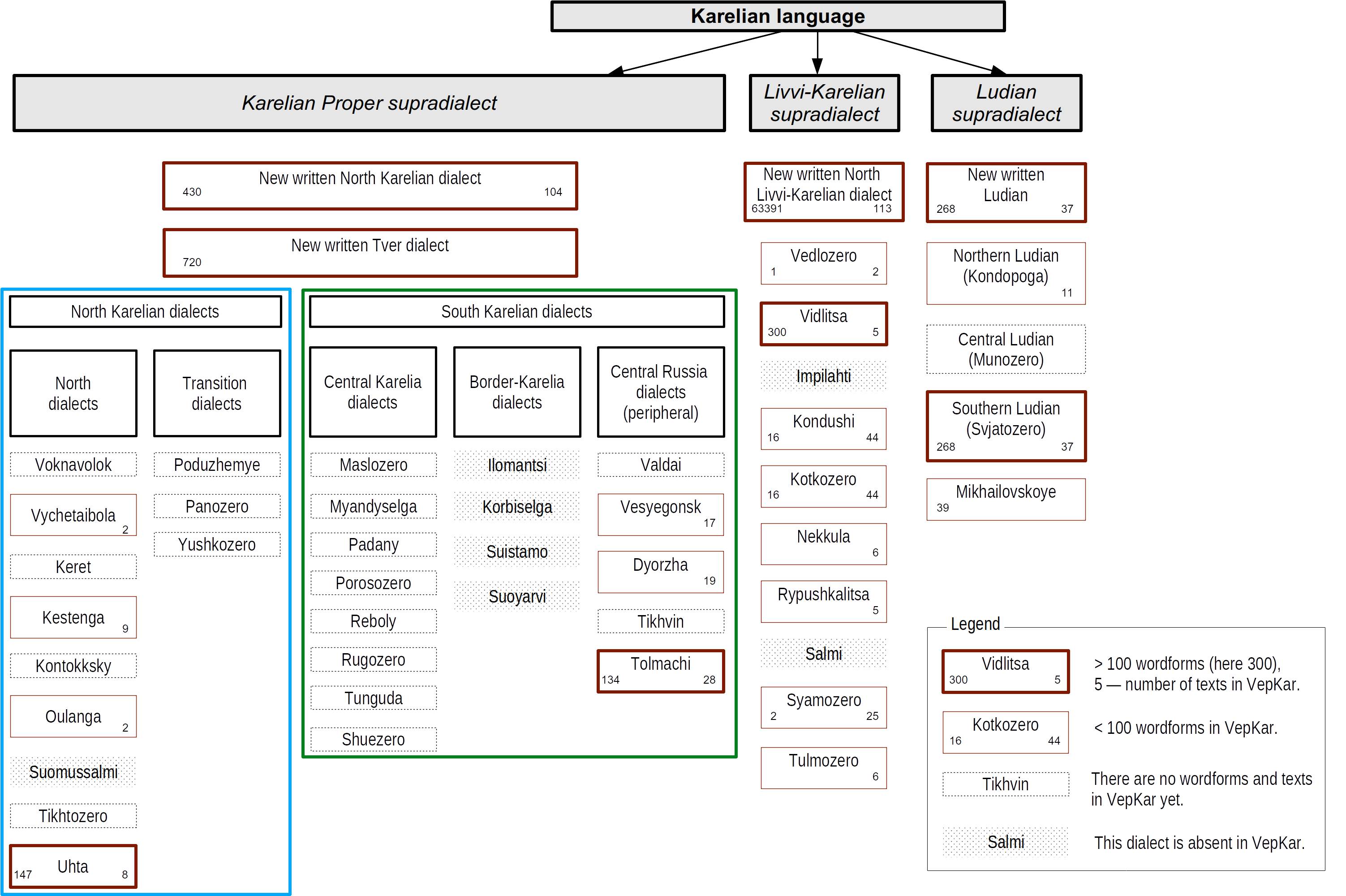
Scheme of the supradialects and dialects of the Karelian language, VepKar corpus, 2019.

- Karelian
  - Karelian Proper
    - North Karelian (spoken in the parishes of Jyskyjärvi, Kieretti, Kiestinki, Kontokki, Oulanka, Paanajärvi, Pistojärvi, Suomussalmi, Uhtua, Usmana, Vitsataipale and Vuokkiniemi)
    - South Karelian (spoken in the parishes of Ilomantsi, Impilahti, Korpiselkä, Mäntyselkä, Paatene, Porajärvi, Repola, Rukajärvi, Suikujärvi, Suistamo, Suojärvi and Tunkua; and additionally in the enclaves of Tver, Tikhvin and Valdai)
      - Tver Karelian
        - Dorža dialect
        - Maksuatiha dialect
        - Ruameška dialect
        - Tolmattšu dialect
        - Vesjegonsk (Vessi) dialect
  - Olonets Karelian or Livvi (spoken in the parishes of Kotkatjärvi, Munjärvi, Nekkula-Riipuškala, Salmi, Säämäjärvi, Tulemajärvi, Vieljärvi and Vitele)

The Ludic language, spoken along the easternmost edge of Karelian Republic, is in the Russian research tradition counted as a third main dialect of Karelian, though Ludic shows strong relationship also to Veps, and it is today also considered a separate language.

== Phonology ==
=== Vowels ===
==== Monophthongs ====
Like Finnish, the Karelian language has 8 phonemic vowel qualities, totalling 11 vowel phonemes when vowel length is considered:

	Front		Back
	unr.	rnd.	Back
Close	i ⟨i⟩	y ⟨y⟩	u ⟨u⟩
Mid	e ⟨e⟩	ø ⟨ö⟩	o ⟨o⟩
Open	æ ⟨ä⟩		ɑ ⟨a⟩

Only the close vowels /i, y, u/ may occur long. The original Proto-Finnic long mid and open vowels have been diphthongized: *ee, *öö, *oo > /ie/, /yö/, /uo/ (as also in Finnish); *aa, *ää > /oa/, /eä/ or /ua/, /iä/ (as also in Savonian dialects of Finnish).

==== Diphthongs ====
North Karelian and Olonets Karelian have 21 diphthongs:

	Front-harmonic			Neutral	Back-harmonic		
	Front+neutral	Front+front	Neutral+front	Neutral	Neutral+back	Back+neutral	Back+back
Open to close	äi	äy				ai	au
Mid to close	öi	öy	ey	ei	eu	oi	ou
Close	yi		iy		iu	ui	
Close to mid		yö		ie			uo
Close to open		yä	iä				ua

==== Triphthongs ====
In addition to the diphthongs North Karelian has a variety of triphthongs:

	Front-harmonic			Neutral	Back-harmonic		
	Front+neutral	Front	Neutral+front	Neutral	Neutral+back	Back+neutral	Back
Close-mid-close		yöy	iey	iei	ieu	uoi	uou
Close-open-close	yäi	yäy	iäy			uai	uau

Olonets Karelian has only the triphthongs ieu, iey, iäy, uau, uou and yöy.

=== Consonants ===
There are 20 non-palatalized consonants in Karelian with their own single grapheme, and 2 are represented with multigraphs:

		Labial	Dental/Alveolar		Palatal (-alveolar)	Velar	Glottal
		Labial	plain	sibilant	Palatal (-alveolar)	Velar	Glottal
Nasal		m	n			ŋ ⟨n⟩	
Plosive/ Affricate	voiceless	p	t	(t͡s) ⟨c⟩	t͡ʃ ⟨č⟩	k	
Plosive/ Affricate	voiced	b	d		d͡ʒ ⟨dž⟩	ɡ	
Fricative	voiceless	(f)		s	ʃ ⟨š⟩		h
Fricative	voiced	v		z	ʒ ⟨ž⟩		
Approximant			l		j		
Trill			r				

- /ŋ/ is present before /g, k, kk/, and the combination is represented with multigraphs ⟨ng, nk, nkk⟩. Karelian Proper does not geminate /ŋ/ in consonant gradation unlike Finnish: kengät 'shoes' pronounces as [ˈkeŋɡæt] instead of Finnish [ˈkeŋŋæt].
- /f, ts/ are found in loanwords (except Ludic Karelian, which has /ts/ in native words).
- /b, d, ɡ, z, ʒ/ are found only in loanwords in Karelian Proper (North), but occur in native words in other varieties of Karelian.
- /dʒ/ is found in Olonets, Ludic, and Tver Karelian.

Some palatalized consonants exist: /lʲ nʲ sʲ tʲ/ in Karelian Proper (North), /dʲ lʲ nʲ rʲ sʲ tʲ/ (/zʲ/ also exists, but only in loanwords) in Olonets Karelian, /dʲ lʲ nʲ rʲ sʲ tʲ zʲ/ in Ludic and Tver Karelian. Palatalized labials are also present in some loanwords:

- Livvi b'urokruattu, North Karelian b'urokratti from Russian бюрократ 'bureaucrat'
- Livvi kip'atku, Tver Karelian kip'atka from Russian кипяток 'boiling water'
- Livvi sv'oklu, Tver Karelian s'v'okla from Russian свёкла 'beet'

== Writing system ==
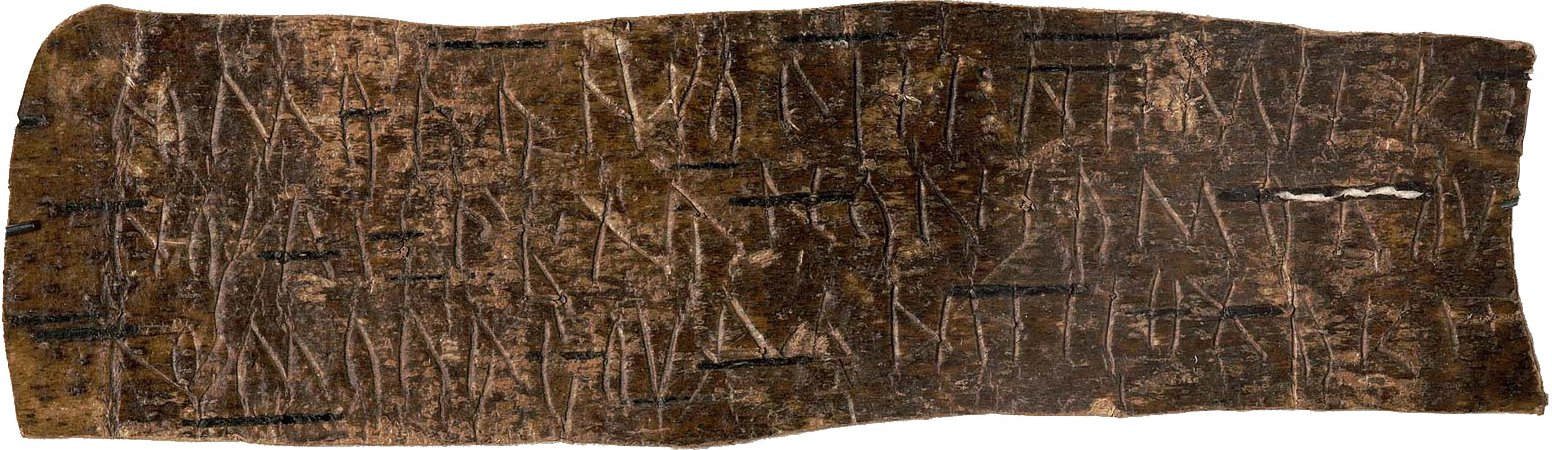
Birch-bark letter No. 292, early 13th century

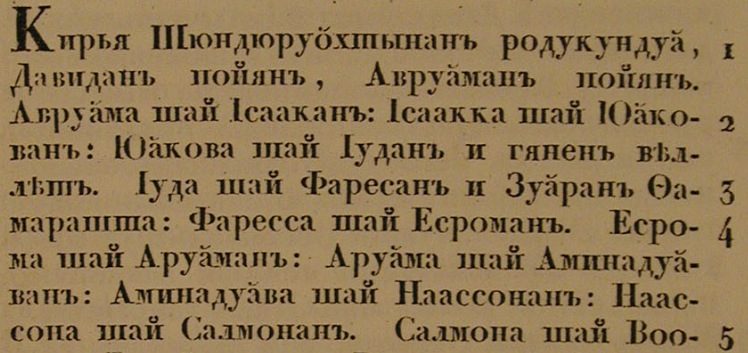
Translation of the Gospel of Matthew into Karelian, 1820

=== Alphabet ===
Karelian is today written using a Latin alphabet consisting of 29 characters. It extends the ISO basic Latin alphabet with the additional letters Č, Š, Ž, Ä, Ö and ' and excludes the letters Q, W and X. This unified alphabet is used to write all Karelian varieties including Tver Karelian. The very few texts that were published in Karelian from medieval times through the 19th century used the Cyrillic alphabet. With the establishment of the Soviet Union, Finnish, written with the Latin alphabet, became official. However, from 1938 to 1940 Karelian written in Cyrillic replaced Finnish as an official language of the Karelian ASSR (see "History" below).

Example from Article 1 of the Universal Declaration of Human Rights in Cyrillic Karelian script, transliteration and translation:

Cyrillic:

Каи рахвас роиттахeс вäллиннÿ да тазаарвозинну омас арвос да оигeвуксис. Ёгахизeлe хeис он аннeтту миeли да оматундо да хeил вäлтäмäттäх пидäÿ олла кeскeнäх, куи вeллил.

Latin:

Kai rahvas roittahes vällinny da taza-arvozinnu omas arvos da oigevuksis. Jogahizele heis on annettu mieli da omatundo da heil vältämättäh pidäy olla keskenäh, kui vellil.

Translation:

All human beings are born free and equal in dignity and rights. They are endowed with reason and conscience and should act towards one another in a spirit of brotherhood.

=== Orthography ===
Karelian is written with orthography similar to Finnish orthography. However, some features of the Karelian language and thus orthography are different from Finnish:

- The Karelian system of sibilants is extensive; in Finnish, there is only one: /s/.
- Phonemic voicing occurs.
- Karelian retains palatalization, usually denoted with an apostrophe (e.g. d'uuri)
- The letter 'ü' may replace 'y' in some texts.
- The letter 'c' denotes /ts/, although 'ts' is used also. 'c' is more likely in Russian loan words.

Sibilants
Letter	Alt.	IPA	Olonets Karelian	Tver Karelian	North Karelian	Finnish
č	ch	/tʃ/	čoma, seiče	šoma, šeiččimen	šoma, šeiččemen	soma, seitsemän
s	s	/s/	se	še	še	se
š	sh	/ʃ/	nišku	niška	niska	niska
z	z	/z/	tazavaldu	tažavalda	tašavalta	tasavalta
ž	zh	/ʒ/	kiža, liedžu	kiza, liedžu	kisa	kisa, lie(t)su

/c/ and /č/ have length levels, which is not found in standard Finnish. For example, in Kalevala, Lönnrot's orthography metsä : metsän hides the fact that the pronunciation of the original material is actually /mettšä : metšän/, with palatalization of the affricate. The exact details depend on the dialect, though. See Yleiskielen ts:n murrevastineet.

Karelian actually uses /z/ as a voiced alveolar fricative. (In Finnish, z is a foreign spelling for /ts/.) The plosives /b/, /d/ and /ɡ/ may be voiced. (In most Finnish dialects, they are not differentiated from the unvoiced /p/, /t/, and /k/. Furthermore, in Karelian except North Karelian, voiced consonants occur also in native words, not just in loans as in standard Finnish.)

The sounds represented by č, š and ž are native to Karelian, but not Finnish. Speakers of Finnish do not distinguish /ʃ/ and /ʒ/ from /s/, nor /tʃ/ from /ts/ (medial) or /s/ (initial). For example, the native Karelian words kiza, šoma, liedžu and seičemen are kisa, soma, lietsu and seitsemän in standard Finnish.

== History ==
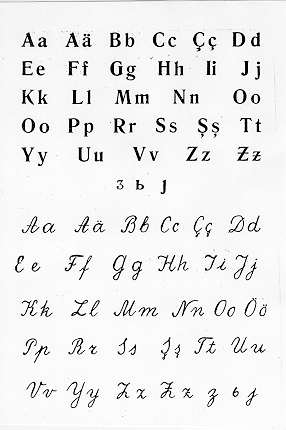
Tver Karelian in 1930 Latin alphabet

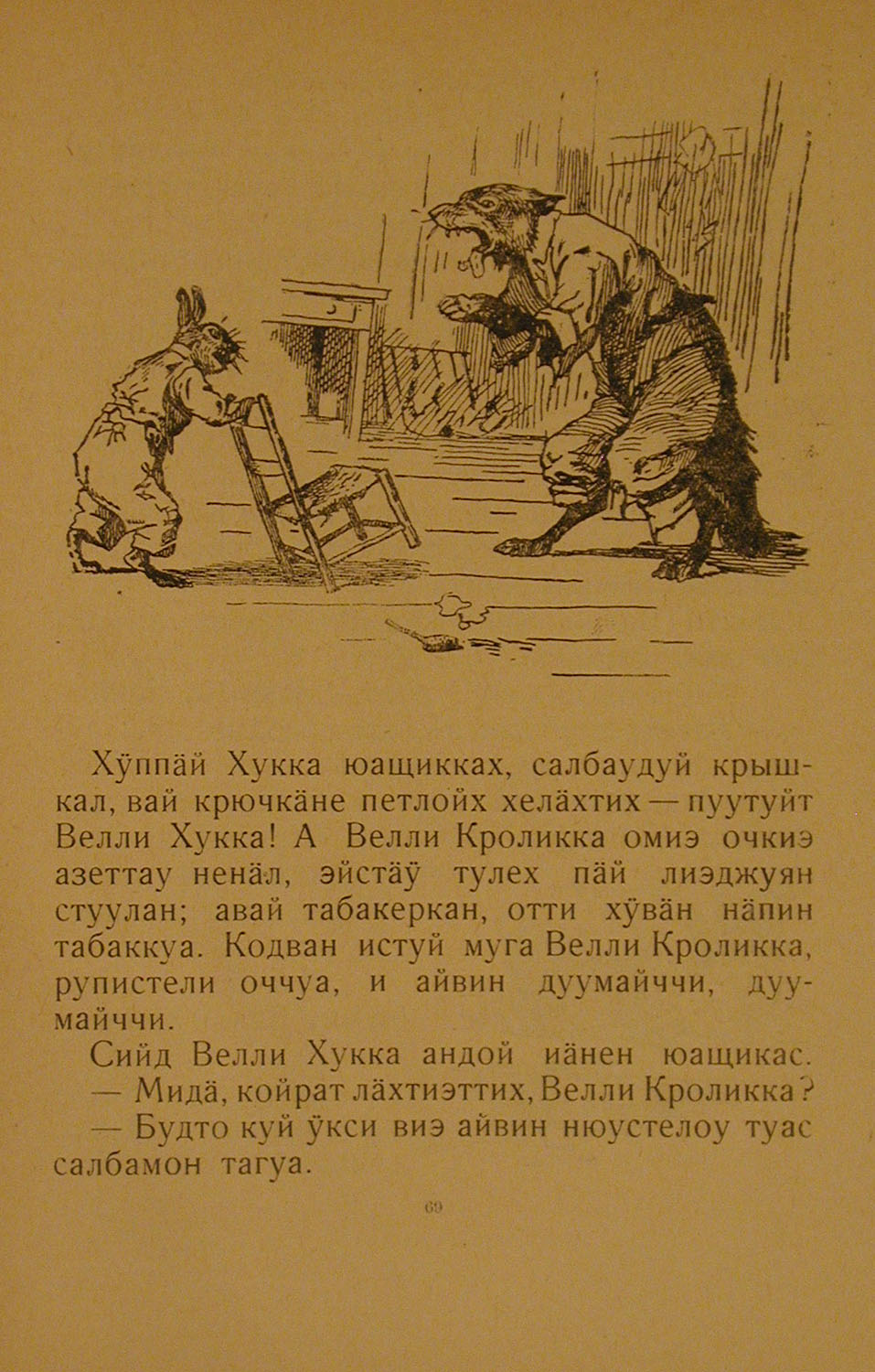
Дядя Римусан Суарнат (Djadja Rimusan Suarnat), Tales of Uncle Remus in Karelian Cyrillic alphabet, 1939

=== Prehistory ===
As all other Finnic languages, Karelian descends from Proto-Finnic, which in turn ultimately descends from Proto-Uralic. The most recent ancestor of the Karelian dialects is the language variety spoken in the 9th century at the western shores of Lake Ladoga, known as Old Karelian (Finnish: muinaiskarjala).

Karelian is usually considered a part of the Eastern Finnic subgroup. It has been proposed that Late Proto-Finnic evolved into three dialects: Northern dialect, spoken in western Finland; Southern dialect, spoken in the area of modern-day Estonia and northern Latvia, and Eastern dialect, spoken in the regions east of the Southern dialect. In the 6th century, Eastern dialect arrived at the western shores of Lake Ladoga, and in the 9th century, Northern dialect reached the same region. These two dialects blended together and formed Old Karelian.

=== Medieval period ===
By the end of the 13th century, speakers of Old Karelian had reached the Savo region in eastern Finland, increasingly mixing with population from western Finland. In 1323, Karelia was divided between Sweden and Novgorod according to the Treaty of Nöteborg, which started to slowly separate descendants of the Proto-Karelian language from each other. In the areas occupied by Sweden, Old Karelian started to develop into dialects of Finnish: Savonian dialects and Southeastern dialects.

Birch bark letter no. 292 from the early 13th century is the first known document in any Finnic language. It was found in 1957 by a Soviet expedition, led by Artemiy Artsikhovskiy in the Nerev excavation on the left coast side of Novgorod. The language used in the document is thought to be an archaic form of the language spoken in Olonets Karelia, a dialect of the Karelian language. A later manuscript, no. 403 (second half of the 14th century), apparently belonging to a tax collector, includes a short glossary of Karelian words and their translations.

In the regions ruled by Novgorod, the protolanguage started to evolve into Karelian language. In 1617 Novgorod lost parts of Karelia to Sweden in the Treaty of Stolbovo, which led the Karelian-speaking population of the occupied areas to flee from their homes. This gave rise to the Karelian speaking population in the Tver and Valday regions.

=== 19th century ===
In the 19th century, a few books were published in Karelian using the Cyrillic script, notably A Translation of some Prayers and a Shortened Catechism into North Karelian and Olonets (Aunus) dialects in 1804, and the gospel of St. Matthew in South Karelian Tver dialect, in 1820. Karelian literature in 19th century Russia remained limited to a few primers, songbooks and leaflets.

=== Soviet period ===
In 1921, the first all-Karelian congress under the Soviet regime debated whether Finnish or Karelian should be the official language (next to Russian) of the new "Karelian Labour Commune" (Karjalan Työkommuuni, Карялан тыöкоммууни in Cyrillic Karelian), which two years later would become the Karelian ASSR. Finnish communists as well as ethnic Finns from North America, who came to live in Soviet Karelia, dominated the political discourse, as they were in general far better educated than local Karelians. They favored the use of Finnish, which had just been through an 80-year period of standardization based on a variety of dialects across Finland – and the Finns saw Karelian simply as additional Finnish dialects. In the end Finnish was established as the official "local" language.

An intense program of Finnicization, but called "Karelianization", began and Finnish-language schools were established across Soviet Karelia. Newspapers, literary journals were established and Russian literature was translated into Finnish, while much literature from Soviet Karelia in Finnish was published.

While this was happening in Soviet Karelia, in 1931–33, a Karelian literary language using the Latin alphabet was standardized for the Tver Karelian community of about 127,000 people, hundreds of kilometers to the south.

Between 1935 and 1938 the Finnish-dominated leadership of Soviet Karelia including leader Edvard Gylling, was removed from power, killed or sent to concentration camps. The Finnish language was branded a language of the bourgeois Finnish society in Finland proper, and was later regarded as a "fascist" language of the Finnish enemy.

From early 1938 to April 1940, the Soviet authorities ceased publication in Finnish, all Finnish-language schools were closed and the children were prohibited from speaking Finnish even during recess. The Soviet government replaced Finnish in the Karelian ASSR with Karelian written in the Cyrillic alphabet.

A new form of standardized Karelian was hurriedly introduced in 1938, written in Cyrillic, with only nine grammatical cases, and with a very large and increasing number of words taken directly from Russian but with Karelian grammatical endings. During this period about 200 titles were published, including educational materials, children's books, readers, Party and public affairs documents, the literary journal Karelia. The newspaper Karjalan Sanomat was written in this new Karelian Cyrillic, rather than in Finnish. Karelians who did not speak Russian could not understand this new official language due to the amount of Russian words, for example, the phrase "Which party led the revolution" in this form of Karelian was given as "Миттўйне партиуя руководи революциюа?" (Mittujne partiuja rukovodi revoljutsijua?) where the word for party, led, and revolution are all Russian words with Karelian grammatical endings, whereas the Finnish equivalent words have completely different roots: "Mikä puolue johti vallankumousta?"

After the Winter War, in April 1940, political considerations changed again. The USSR established the Karelo-Finnish SSR with the idea that Finland proper would eventually be annexed to the USSR as part of that Republic. Finnish, written in the Latin alphabet, was once again made the official "local" language of Soviet Karelia, alongside Russian.

In the 1980s, publishing began again in various adaptations of the Latin alphabet for Olonets Karelian and the White Sea and Tver dialects of Karelian Proper.

=== Recent events ===
Since the 1990s the Union of Karelian people started to organize various projects to popularize the Karelian language in Karelia and Finland.

In 2007 a standard alphabet was adopted to write all dialects (Tver Karelian adopted it in 2017).

In 2008, Joensuu University launched Finland's first Karelian language professorship, to save the language. A year later, Finland's first Karelian language nest (pre-school immersion group) was established in the town of Nurmes.

Croatian singer Jurica Popović collaborated with Tilna Tolvaneen on lyrics for his 1999 song "H.O.T. Hold On To Your Tradition", which are partly in Karelian.

== Media in Karelian ==
- Oma Mua is published in Olonets Karelian.
- Vienan Karjala is published in North Karelian dialect.
- Karielan Šana is published in Tver Karelian dialect.
- Karjal Žurnualu – A monthly Karelian-language journal published by Karjalan Kielen Seura in Finland.
- Yle Uudizet karjalakse – News articles and a weekly radio news program in Karelian are published by the Finnish Broadcasting Company.

== Examples of Karelian supradialects ==
=== North Karelian (White Sea Karelian) ===
A sample from the book Luemma vienankarjalaksi:

Vanhat ihmiset šanottih, jotta joučen on ihmiseštä tullun. Jouččenet aina ollah parittain. Kun yksi ammuttanneh, ni toini pitälti itköy toistah. Vain joučen oli pyhä lintu. Šitä ei nikonša ruohittu ampuo, šiitä tulou riähkä. Jouččenet tullah meilä kevyällä ta šykšyllä tuaš lähetäh jälelläh šuvipuoleh. Hyö lennetäh šuurissa parviloissa. Šilloin kun hyö lähettih, ni še oli merkki, jotta talvi on läššä.

(Translation: Old people used to say that the swan is born of man. Swans are always paired up. When one is shot, the other weeps for it for a long time. Yet the swan is a sacred bird. Nobody ever dared to shoot them, for that was a sin. Swans come to us in the spring and in the autumn they leave again for the south. They fly in large flocks. When they left, it was a sign that winter was near.)

=== Olonets Karelian ===
==== Sample 1 ====
Article 1 of the Universal Declaration of Human Rights:

Kai rahvas roittahes vällinny da taza-arvozinnu omas arvos da oigevuksis. Jogahizele heis on annettu mieli da omatundo da heil vältämättäh pidäy olla keskenäh, kui vellil.

(English version: All human beings are born free and equal in dignity and rights. They are endowed with reason and conscience and should act towards one another in a spirit of brotherhood.)

==== Sample 2 ====
A sample from the book Karjalan kielen harjoituskogomus III–IV luokku Livvin murdehel. Note the older alphabet:

Olonets Karelian	Standard Finnish	English translation
Karjalas on čoma luondo. Korgiet koivut,	Karjalassa on kaunis luonto. Korkeat koivut,	There is beautiful nature in Karelia. Tall birches,
vihandat kuuzet da pedäjät čomendetah meččiä.	vihannat kuuset ja petäjät koristavat metsiä.	green spruces and Scots pines decorate the forests.
Joga kohtaine on täüzi muarjua da siendü.	Joka paikka on täynnä marjaa ja sientä.	Every place is full of berries and mushrooms.
Kehtua vai kerätä! Järvet da jovetgi ollah kalakkahat:	Kehtaa vain kerätä! Järvet ja joetkin ovat kalaisat:	If only one picked them! The lakes and rivers, too, are full of fish:
ongo haugii, lahnua, säüniä, matikkua, kuhua, siigua.	on haukia, lahnoja, säyneitä, madetta, kuhaa, siikaa.	there is pike, carp bream, ide, burbot, zander, whitefish.
Ota ongiruagu da juokse järvele!	Ota onkivapa ja juokse järvelle!	Take a fishing rod and run to the lake!

=== Tver Karelian ===
Irina Novak speaks about the Karelian language and Karelians. Irina talks in Tolmachevsky dialect (one of the three Tver Karelian dialects, it is one of the Karelian Proper dialects). KarRC RAS, 2018. See subtitles in Karelian language.

A sample from the book Armaš šana:

Puasinkoi on pieni karielan külä Tverin mualla. Šielä on nel'l'äkümmendä taluo. Šeizov külä joven rannalla. Jogi virduav hil'l'ah, žentän händä šanotah Tihvinča. Ümbäri on ülen šoma mua. – Tuatto šaneli: ammuin, monda šadua vuotta ennen, šinne tuldih Pohjois-Karielašta karielan rahvaš. Hüö leikkattih mečän i šeizatettih tämän külän. I nüt vielä küläššä šeizotah kojit, kumbazet on luaittu vanhašta mečäštä.

(Translation: Puasinkoi is a small Karelian village in the Tver region. There are forty houses. The village lies by a river. The river flows slowly—that's why it's called Tihvinitša. The surrounding region is very beautiful.—(My) father told (me): once, many hundreds of years ago, Karelians from North-Karelia came there. They cut down the forest and founded this village. And even now, there are houses in the village, which have been built from the trees of the old forest.)

== See also ==
- Birch bark letter no. 292
- Čičiliusku
- Karelia
- Bible translations into Karelian

== Sources ==
- Ahtia, E. V. (1938): Karjalan kielioppi: Äänne- ja sanaoppi. Suojärvi: Karjalan kansallisseura.
- Ahtia, Edvard V. (2014): Karjalan kielioppi II: Johto-oppi. Joensuu: Karjalan Kielen Seura. ISBN 978-952-5790-42-9.
- Ahtia, Edvard V. (2014): Karjalan kielioppi III: Lauseoppi. Joensuu: Karjalan Kielen Seura. ISBN 978-952-5790-39-9.
- Klyachko, Elena; Sorokin, Alexey; Krizhanovskaya, Natalia; Krizhanovsky, Andrew; Ryazanskaya, Galina (2019). "LowResourceEval-2019: a shared task on morphological analysis for low-resource languages" ( (PDF)). Computational Linguistics and Intellectual Technologies (Conference "Dialog" 2019). Moscow, Russia. pp. 45–62. arXiv:2001.11285. Archived from the original on 2020-01-10.
- Bakró-Nagy, Marianne; Laakso, Johanna; Skribnik, Elena (2022). The Oxford Guide to the Uralic Languages. Oxford University Press. ISBN 978-0-19-876766-4.
- Ojansuu, Heikki (1918): Karjala-aunuksen äännehistoria. Suomalaisen Kirjallisuuden Seuran toimituksia 162.
- Virtaranta, Pertti; Koponen, Raija (eds) (1968–2005): Karjalan kielen sanakirja. Helsinki: Kotimaisten kielten tutkimuskeskus / Suomalais-Ugrilainen Seura.
- Zaykov, P. M. (1999): Grammatika Karelskogo Yazyka fonetika i morfologia. Petrozavodsk: Periodika.
