= Karjalan Sanomat =

- Type: Weekly newspaper
- Owner(s): OmaMedia
- Publisher: Periodika
- Editor-in-chief: Mikko Nesvitski
- Founded: 1920
- Language: Finnish
- Headquarters: Petrozavodsk, Republic of Karelia
- Country: Russia
- Circulation: 1,230 (as of 1920)
- Website: www.karjalansanomat.ru

Karjalan Sanomat (literally: Karelia's Messages) is a weekly Finnish language newspaper from the Republic of Karelia, published in Petrozavodsk. The newspaper was founded in 1920 as 'Karjalan kommuuni'.

The newspaper is owned by OmaMedia, a conglomerate in the Karelian-language newspaper- industry. Its publisher is Periodika, a Russian state-owned publisher associated with OmaMedia.

Previous names:

- 1920-1923: Karjalan kommuuni (Karelian Commune)
- 1923-1937: Punainen Karjala (Red Karelia)
- 1938-1940: Советской Карелия (Soviet Karelia)
- 1940-1955: Totuus (Truth)
- 1955-1957: Leninilainen totuus (Lenin's Truth)
- 1957-1991: Neuvosto-Karjala (Soviet Karelia)
- 1991-: Karjalan sanomat (Karelian News)

From 1938 to 1940 the newspaper was printed in Karelian using Cyrillic, rather than Finnish.

== See also ==
- Eastern Bloc information dissemination
