= List of Karelians =

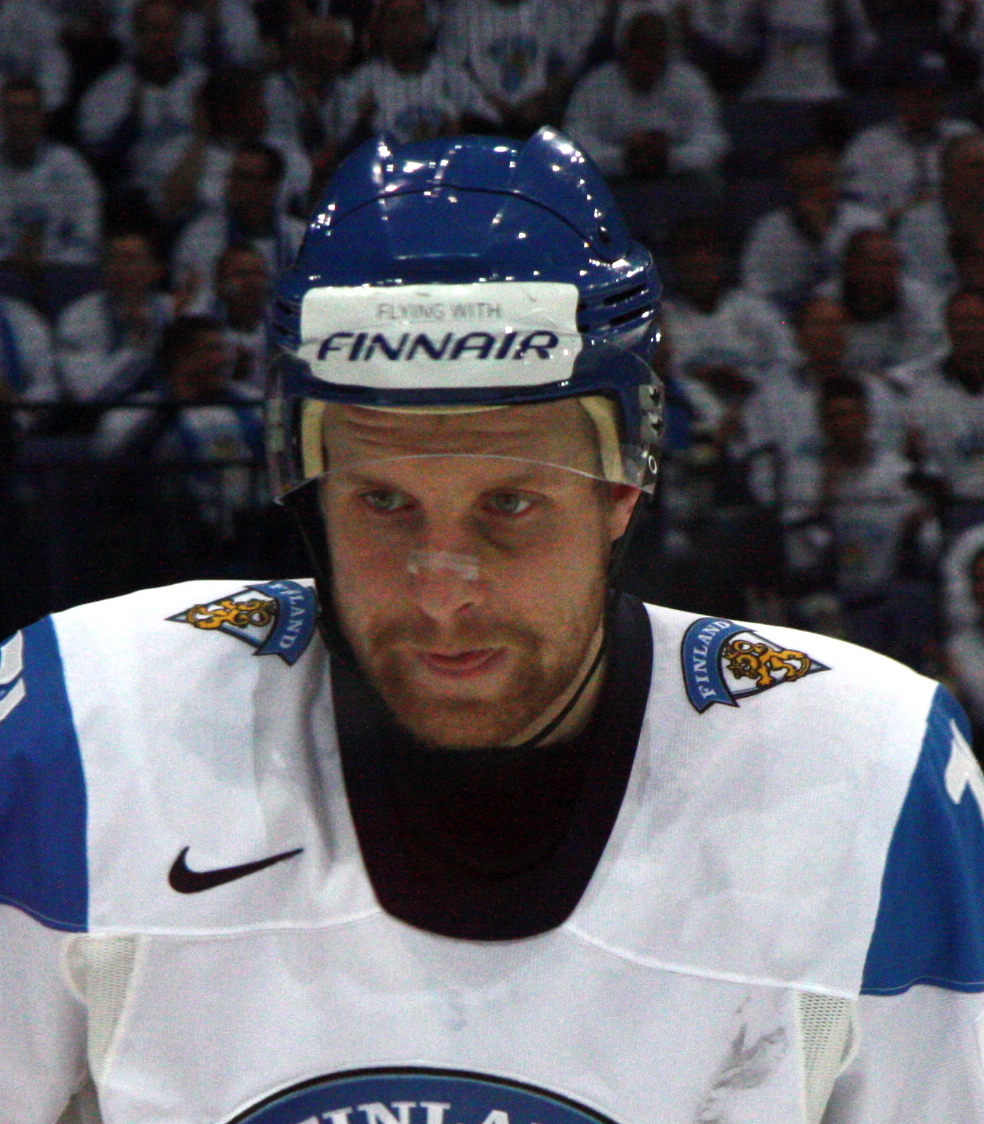
Leo Komarov

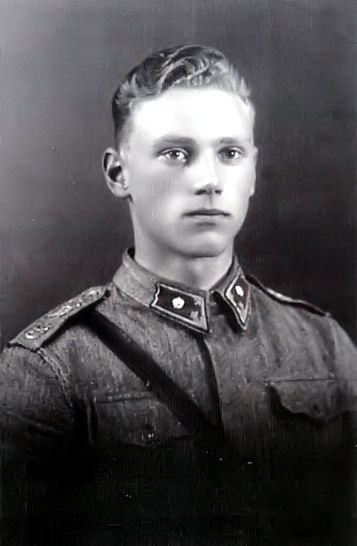
Lauri Torni

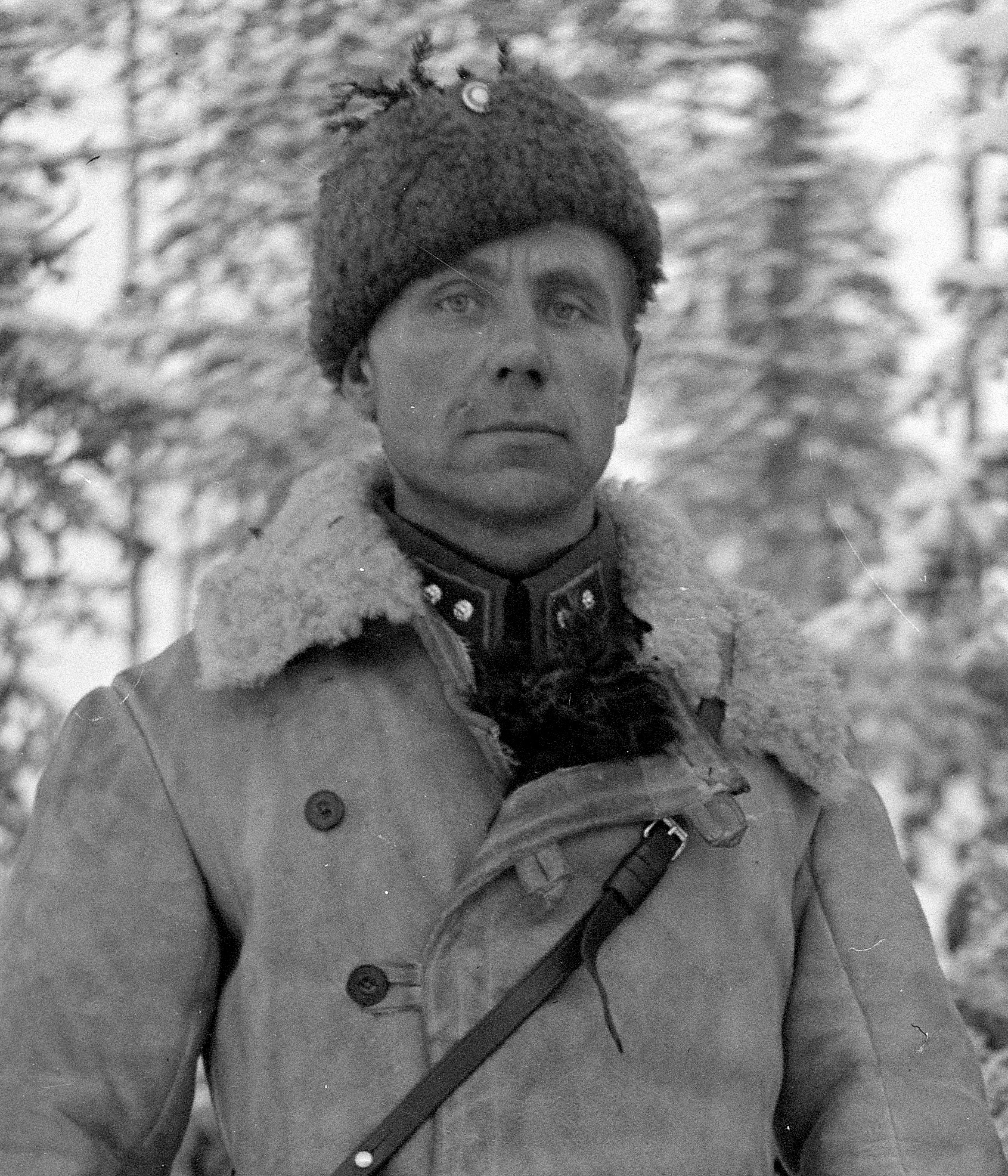
Aarne Juutilainen

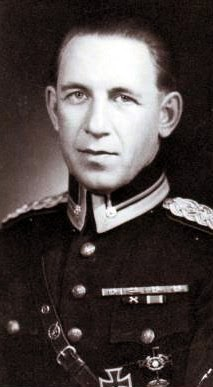
Eino Luukkanen

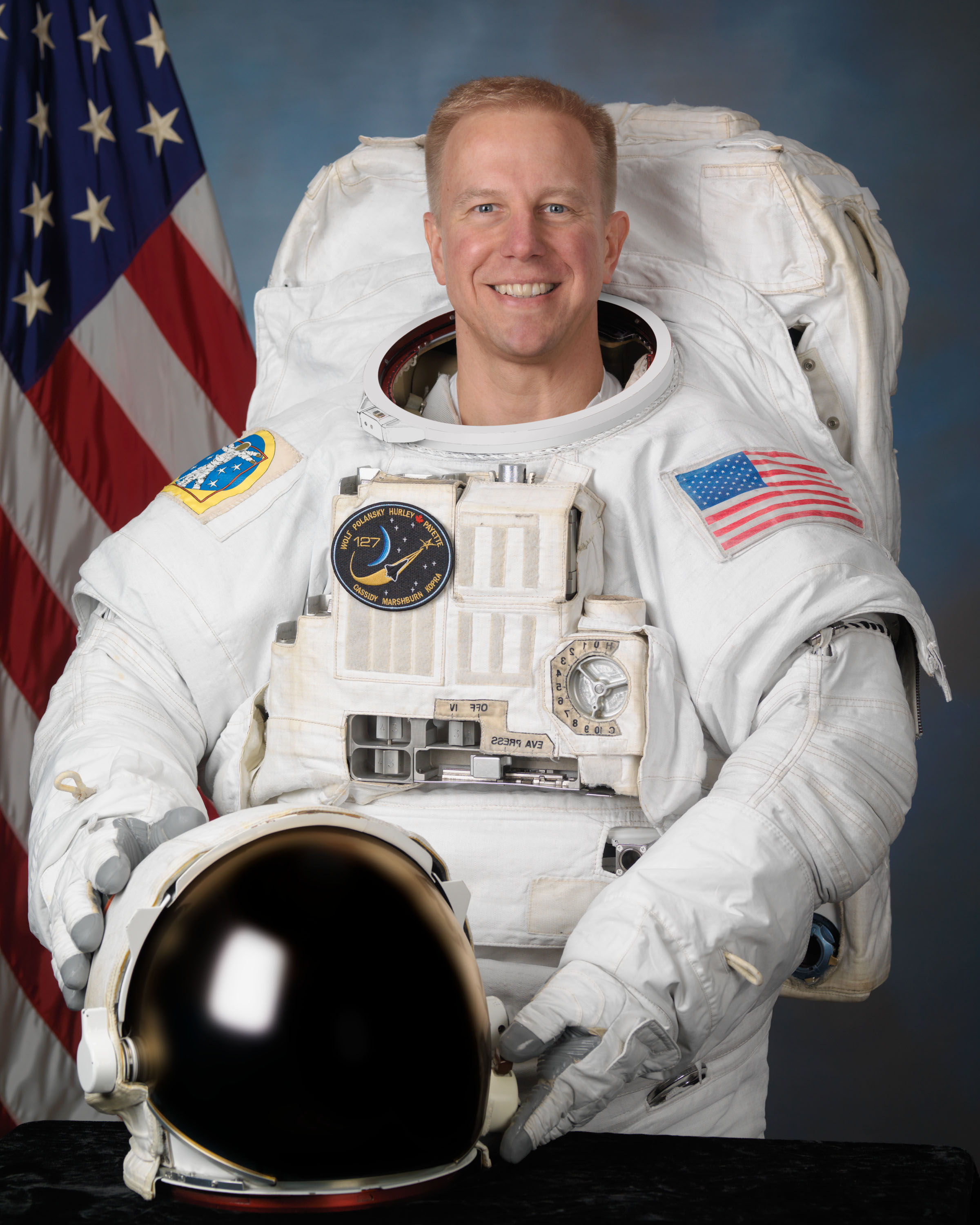
Tim Kopra

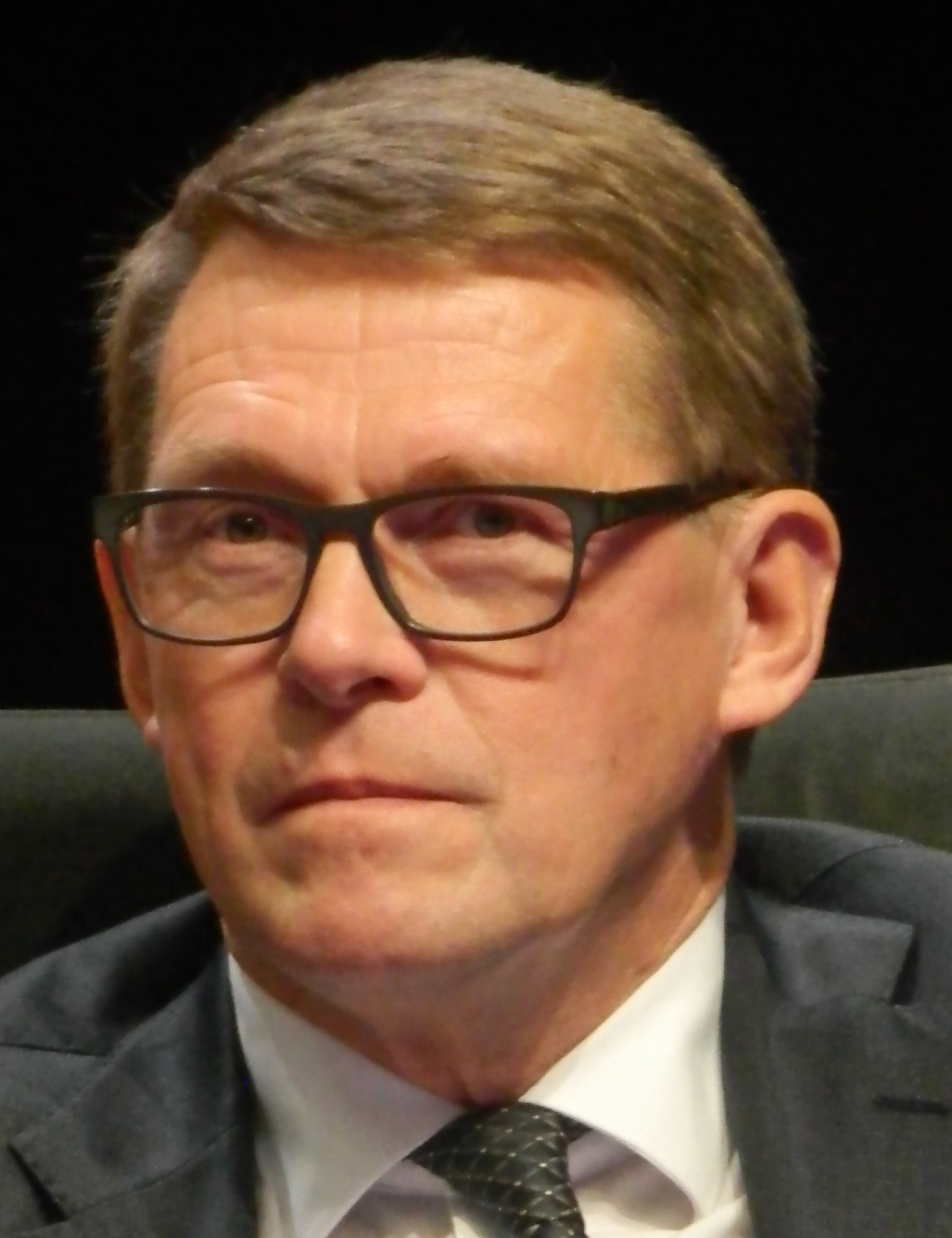
Matti Vanhanen

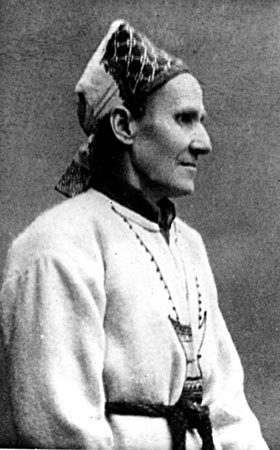
Larin Paraske

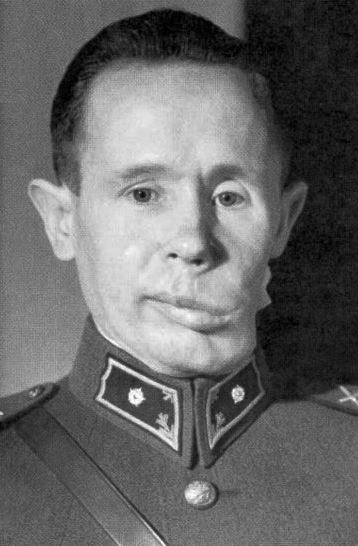
Simo Häyhä

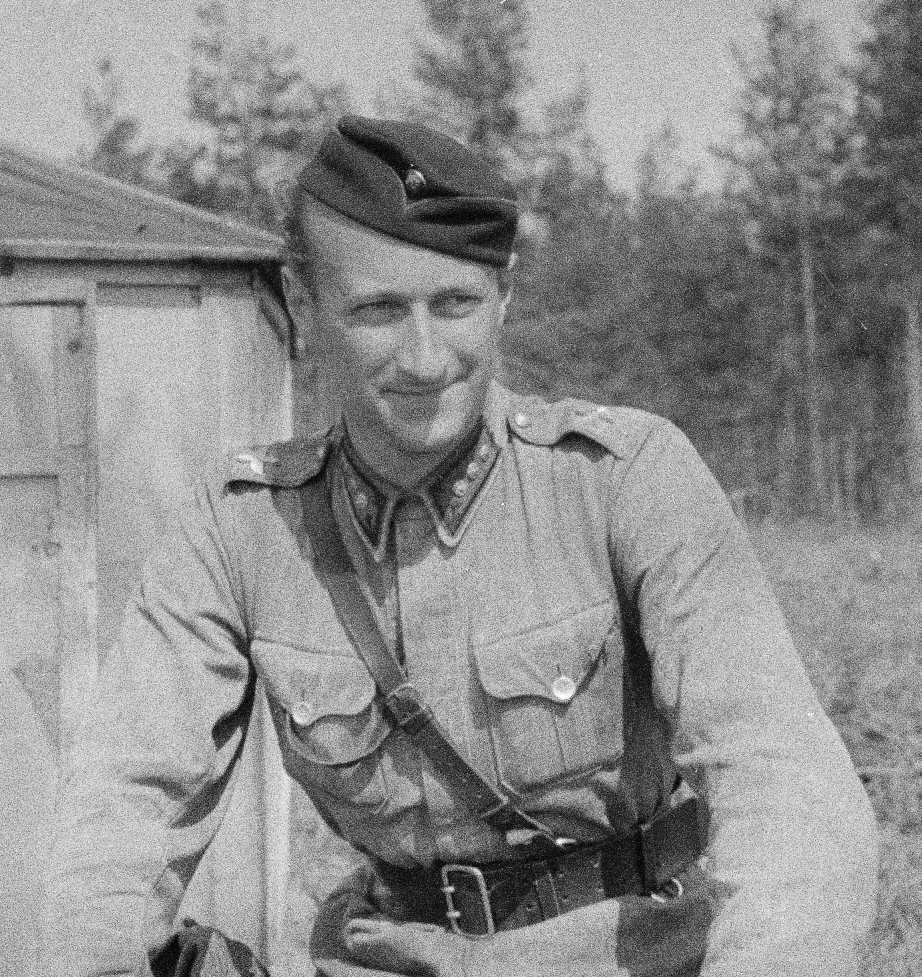
Olli Puhakka

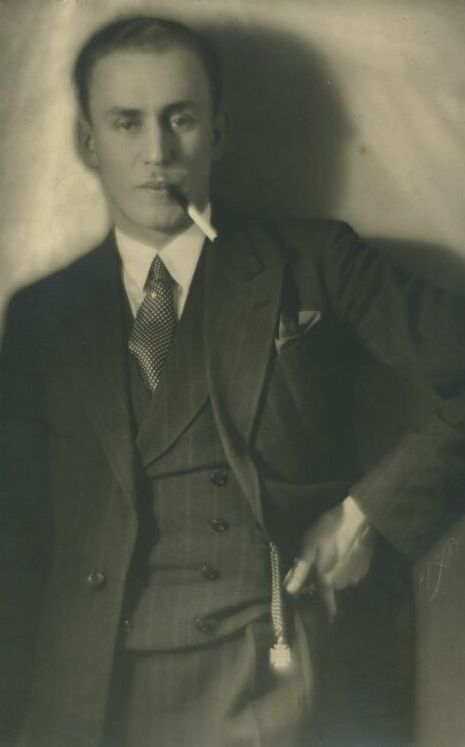
Olavi Paavolainen

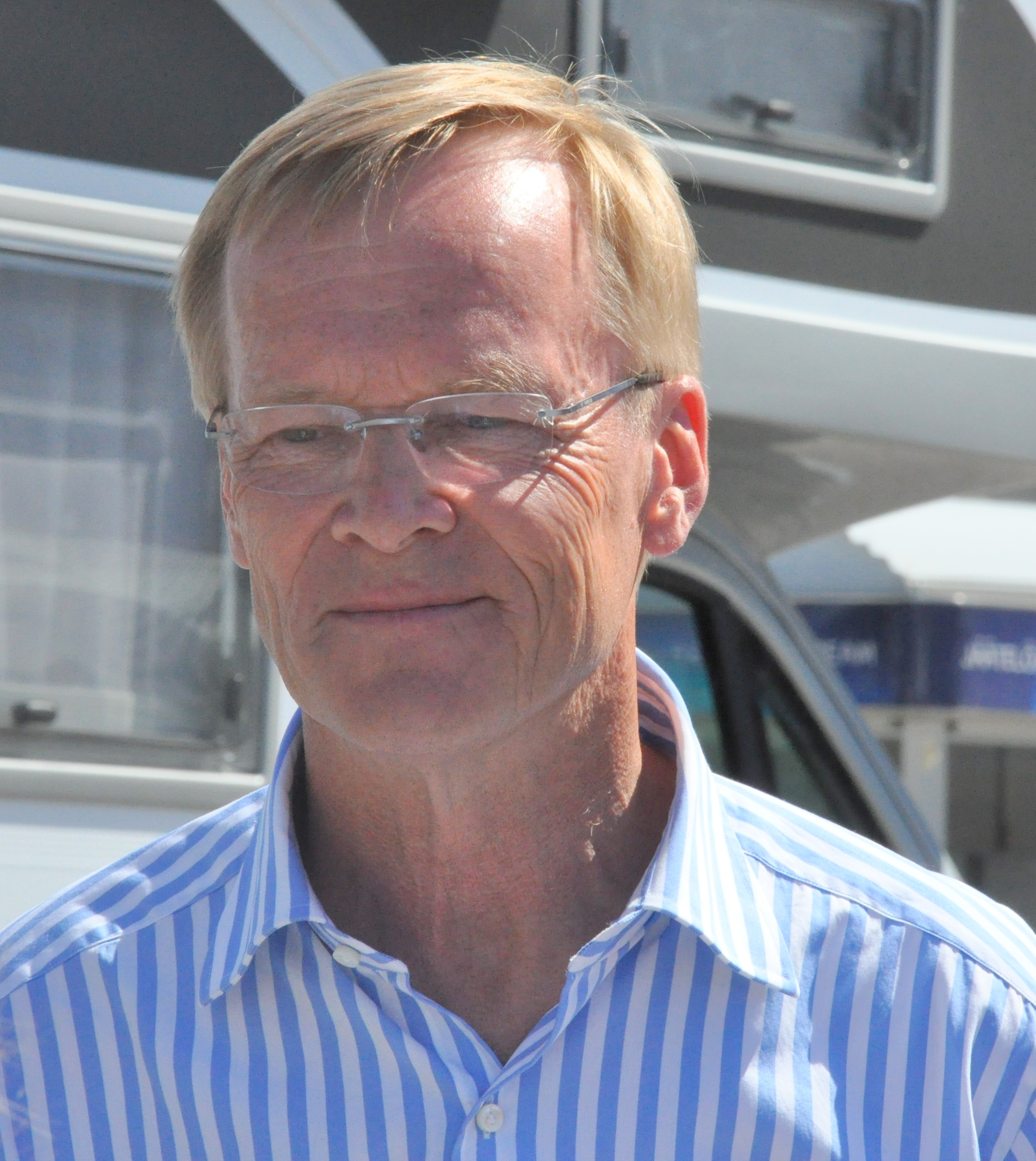
Ari Vatanen

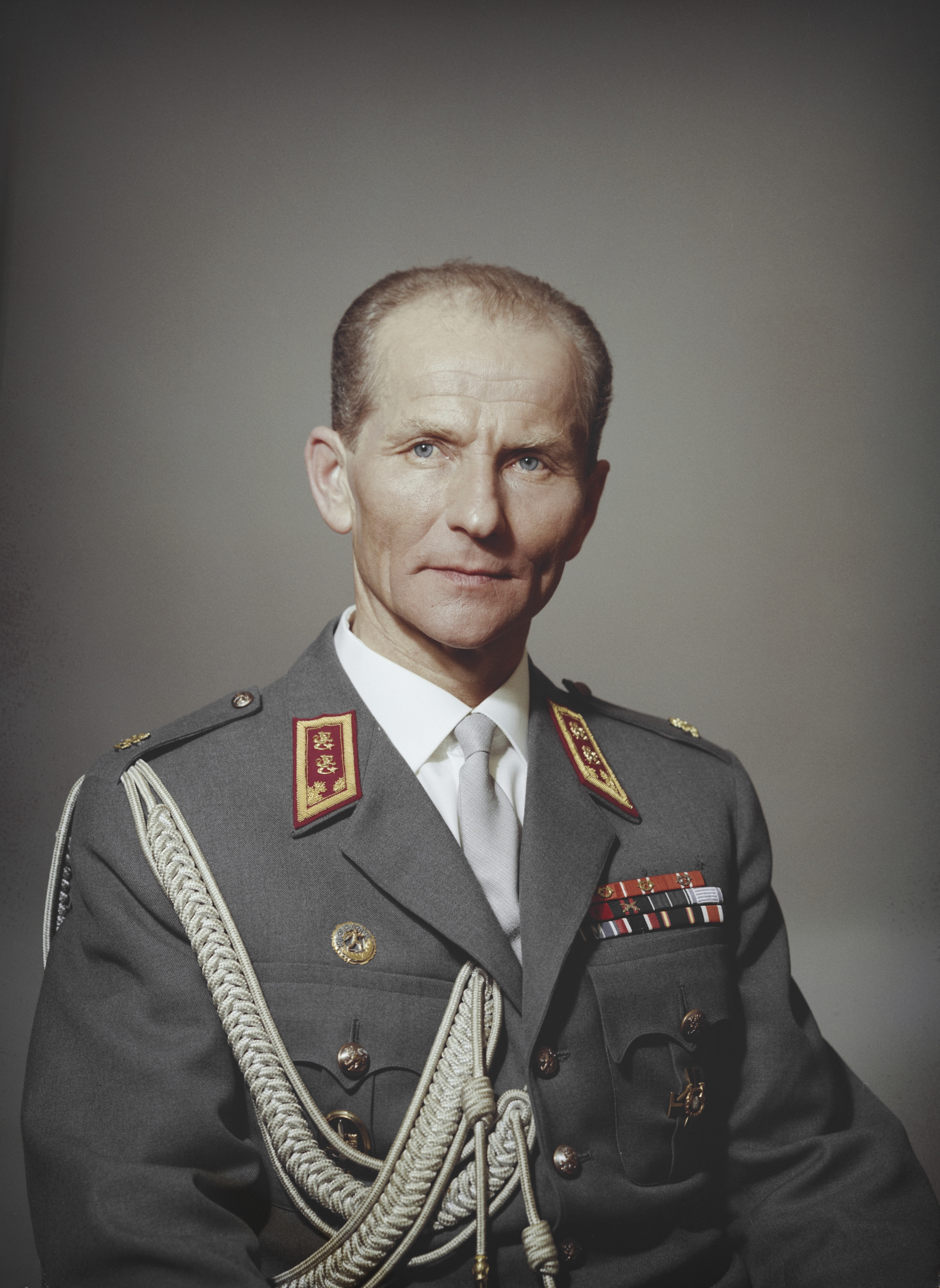
Yrjö Keinonen

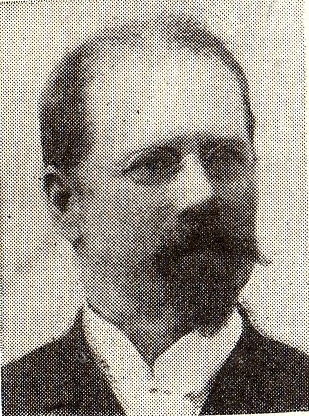
Pekka Hannikainen

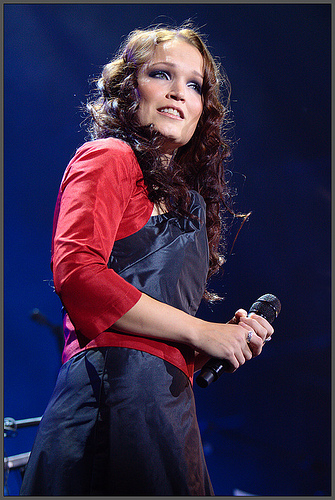
Tarja Turunen

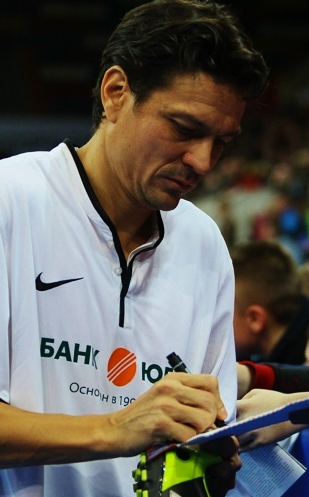
Jari Litmanen

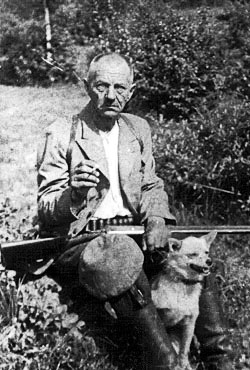
Aleksanteri Aava

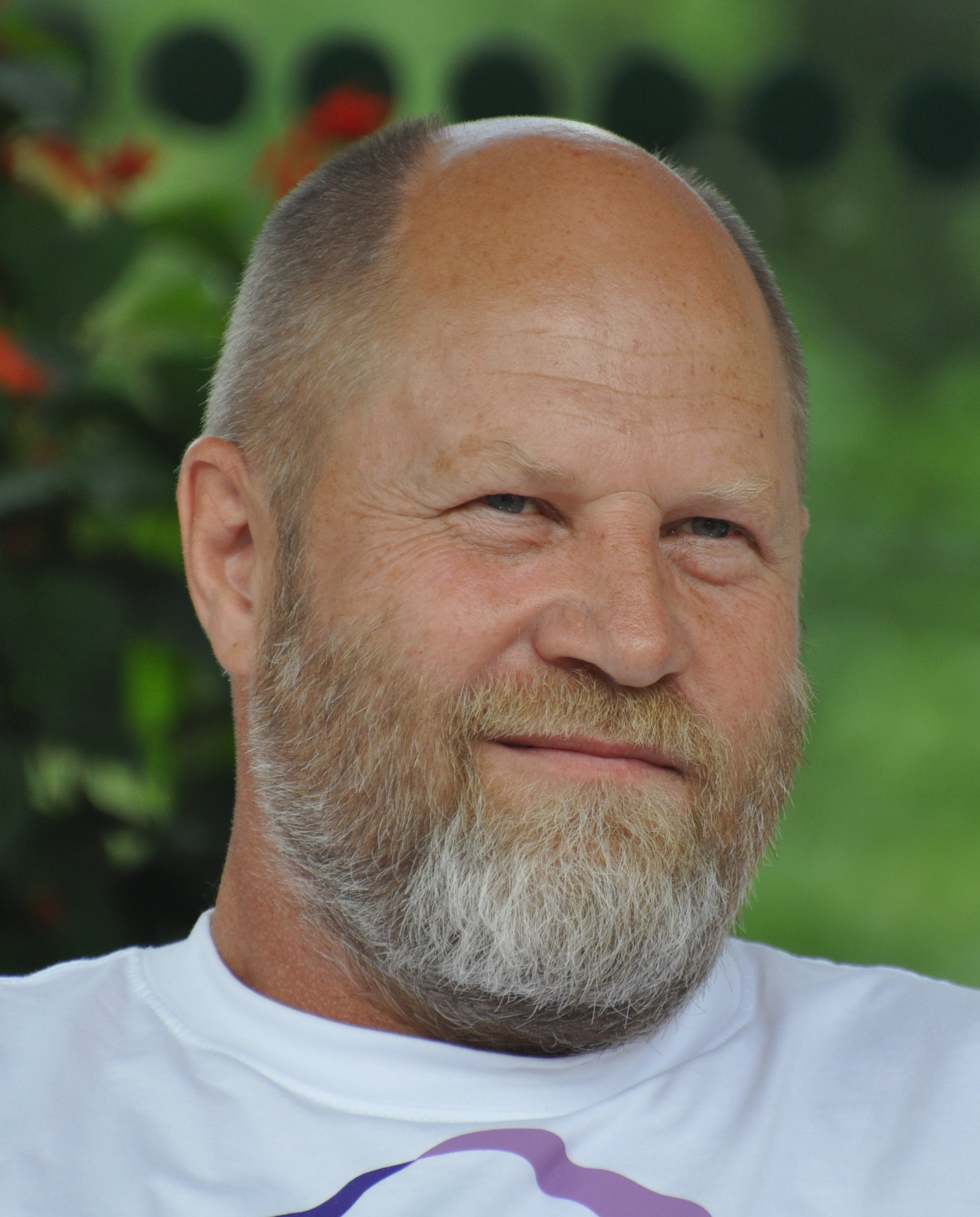
Markku Pölönen

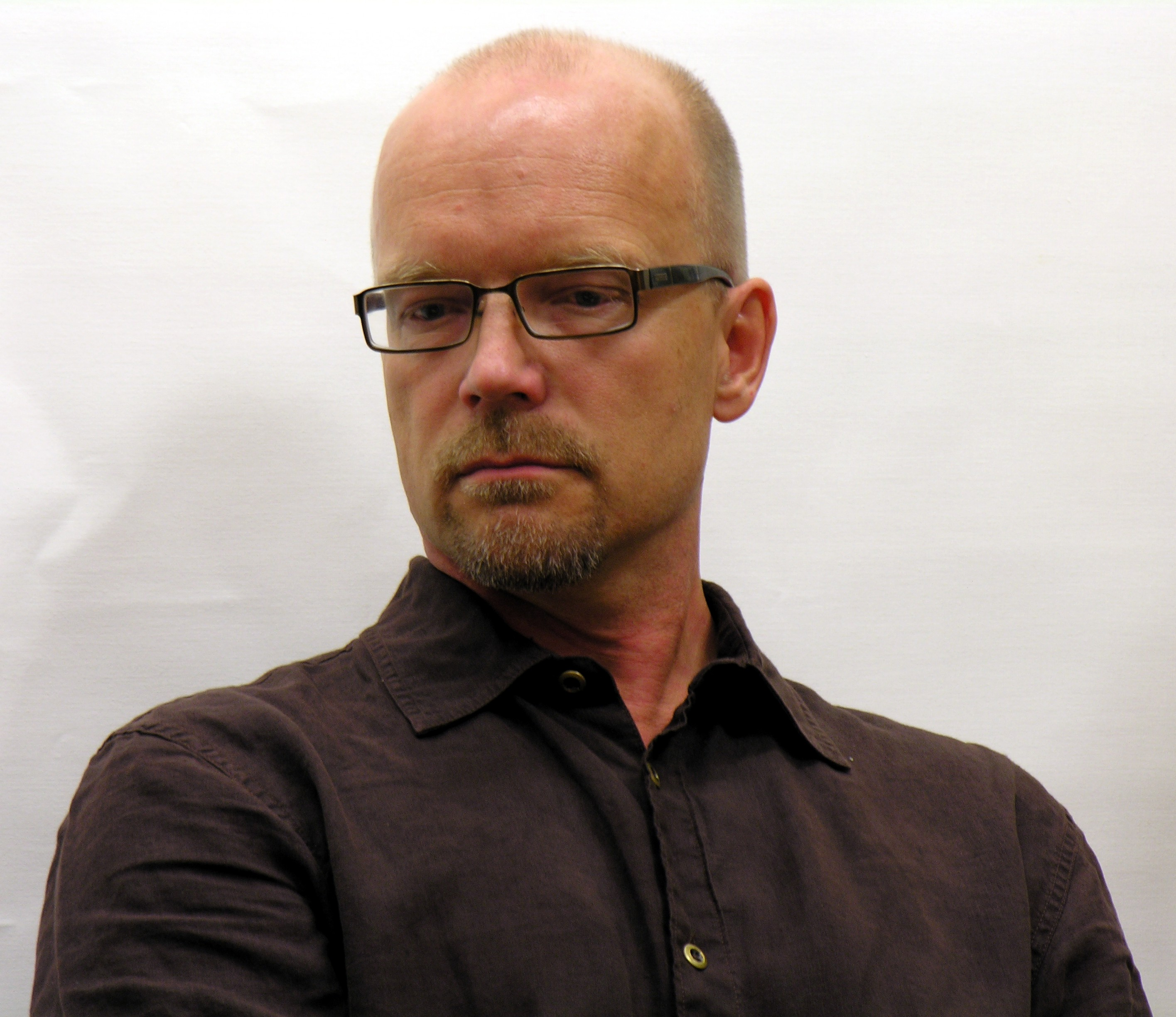
Kari Heiskanen

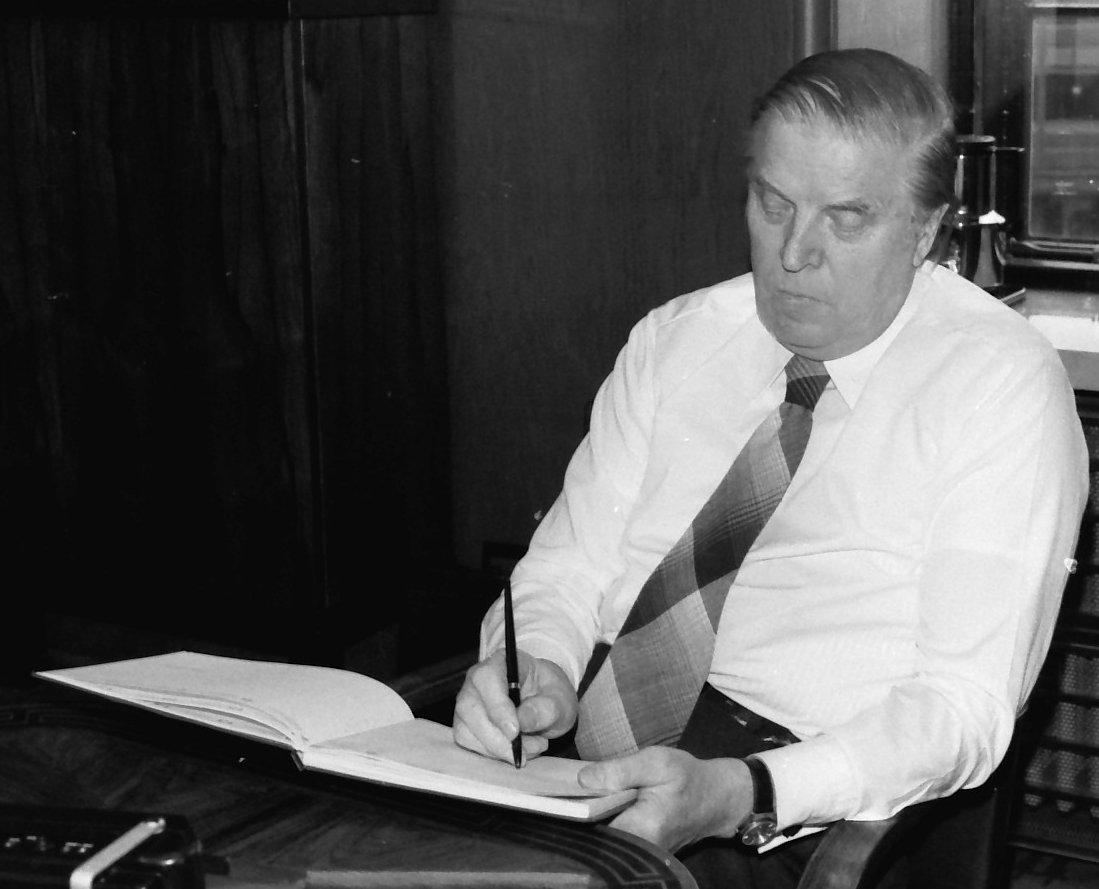
Johannes Virolainen

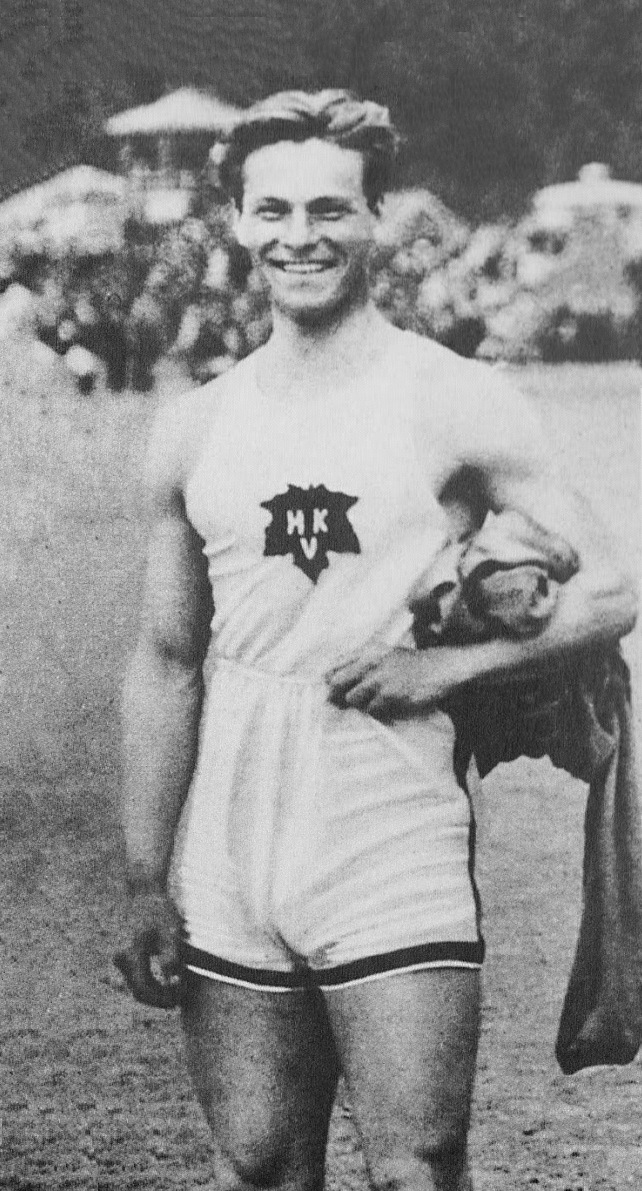
Eino Penttilä

This list of Karelians lists both people from Republic of Karelia, Finnish Karelians and other people of Karelian ancestry.

== People from Republic of Karelia ==
- Fyodor Terentyev, Soviet cross-country skier
- Lyudmila Markianova, Karelian linguist
- Viktor Stepanov, Russian politician
- Vladimir Stepanov, Soviet diplomat and intelligence officer
- Mariya Melentyeva, Soviet partisan
- Pavel Prokkonen, Soviet politician
- Zinaida Dubinina, poet, translator
- Iivo Ahava, Finnish military officer
- Ville Tikkanen, Finnish politician

=== Viena Karelians ===
- Ukki Väinämöinen, ideological leader of East Karelian uprising
- Arhippa Perttunen, rune singer
- Miihkali Perttunen, rune singer

== Finnish Karelians ==
- Antti Aalto, Finnish ice hockey player
- Matti Aarnio, Finnish military officer and motti specialist
- Aleksanteri Aava, Finnish poet
- Tuomas Aho, Finnish football player
- Aleksanteri Ahola-Valo, Finnish artist, architect and thinker
- Martti Ahtisaari, Finnish president from 1994 to 2000, Nobel Peace Prize Laureate 2008
- Toimi Alatalo, Finnish cross country skier and Olympic winner
- Koop Arponen, Finnish-Dutch musician
- Alfred Asikainen, Finnish wrestler, Olympic bronze medallist and participant in longest wrestling match in history
- Teuvo Aura, Finnish politician, born in Ruskeala
- Anna Easteden, Finnish actress
- Riikka Ellonen, Finnish basketball player. Mother of Lauri Markkanen and Eero Markkanen
- Sakari Ellonen, Finnish bandy player
- Kari Haakana, Finnish ice hockey player
- Veikko Hakulinen, Finnish cross country skier and three time Olympic winner
- Arto Halonen, Finnish filmmaker
- Kaarlo Halttunen, Finnish actor
- Ann-Elise Hannikainen, Finnish composer
- Arvo Hannikainen, Finnish composer and violinist
- Heikki Hannikainen, Finnish diplomat
- Ilmari Hannikainen, Finnish composer and pianist
- Pietari Hannikainen, Finnish writer
- P.J. Hannikainen, Finnish composer
- Tauno Hannikainen, Finnish conductor and cellist
- Väinö Hannikainen, Finnish composer
- Toomas Heikkinen, Finnish rallycross driver
- Kari Heiskanen, Finnish actor
- Katri Helena, Finnish singer
- Mikko Hietanen, Finnish long-distance runner, European Champion
- Laila Hirvisaari, Finnish author
- Tuomas Holopainen, Finnish musician
- Hannu Hoskonen, Finnish politician
- Veikko Huhtanen, Finnish gymnast and three time Olympic winner
- Jouni Hynynen, Finnish musician
- Mikko Hyyrynen, Finnish football player
- Juho Hänninen, Finnish rally driver
- Jorma Härkönen, Finnish middle-distance runner
- Simo Häyhä, Finnish sniper
- Ansa Ikonen, Finnish actress
- Rieti Itkonen, Finnish politician
- Max Jakobson, Finnish-Jewish diplomat
- Mikko Jokela, Finnish ice hockey player
- Jesse Joronen, Finnish football player
- Aarne Juutilainen, Finnish Army captain and mercenary in French Foreign Legion
- Ilmari Juutilainen, Finnish fighter ace
- Nestori Kaasalainen, Finnish politician
- Marjatta Kajosmaa, Finnish cross-country skier, four time Olympic medallist
- Hannu Kapanen, Finnish ice hockey player
- Stepan Karhapää, Finnish rune singer
- Paavo Karjalainen, Finnish journalist and politician
- Aki Karvonen, Finnish cross-country skier and three time Olympic medallist
- Veikko Karvonen, Finnish marathon runner and Olympic bronze medallist
- Heino Kaski, Finnish composer
- Pia Kauma, Finnish politician
- Yrjö Keinonen, Finnish general and former Chief of Defence
- Matti Kekki, Finnish politician
- Anneli Kiljunen, Finnish politician
- Anssi Kippo, Finnish music producer
- Marja-Liisa Kirvesniemi, Finnish cross-country skier, three time Olympic gold medallist and four time bronze medallist
- Eila Kivikk'aho, Finnish poet
- Timo Kivinen, Finnish general and Chief of Defence
- Uuno Klami, Finnish composer
- Teuvo Kohonen, Finnish researcher, best known for the development of self-organizing map
- Yrjö Kokko, Finnish writer
- Janne Kolehmainen, Finnish ice hockey player
- Joonas Kolkka, Finnish football player
- Gustaf Komppa, Finnish chemist
- Aku Korhonen, Finnish actor and director
- Paavo Korhonen, Finnish skier
- Väinö Korhonen, Finnish modern pentathlete, two time Olympic bronze medallist
- Tapio Korjus, Finnish javelin thrower
- Esko Kovero, Finnish actor
- Mateli Magdalena Kuivalatar, Rune singer
- Sakari Kukko, Finnish musician
- Mikko Kuningas, Finnish football player
- Jarno Kultanen, Finnish ice hockey player
- Jari Kurri, Finnish ice hockey player
- Kyösti Kylälä, Finnish engineer and inventor
- Heikki Kähkönen, Finnish wrestler and Olympic medallist in Greco-Roman wrestling.
- Kyösti Laasonen, Finnish archer, Olympic bronze medallist
- Samppa Lajunen, Finnish Nordic combined athlete, three time Olympic gold medallist
- Timo Lavikainen, Finnish actor
- Eino Leino, Finnish poet
- Ville Leino, Finnish ice hockey player
- Mikko Leinonen, Finnish businessman and politician
- Kari Liimo, Finnish basketball player
- Arvi Lind, Finnish news anchor
- Antti Lindtman, Finnish politician
- Anna-Liisa Linkola, Finnish politician
- Kaarlo Linkola, Finnish botanist and phytogeographer
- Timo Lipitsä, Finnish rune singer
- Antti Litja, Finnish actor
- Jari Litmanen, Finnish football player
- Olavi Litmanen, Finnish football player
- Eino Luukkanen, Finnish fighter ace
- Matti Lähde, Finnish cross country skier and Olympic winner
- Pave Maijanen, Finnish musician
- Niina Malm, Finnish politician
- Albin Manner, Finnish politician
- Martti Mansikka, Finnish gymnast, Olympic bronze medallist
- Jussi Markkanen, Finnish ice hockey player
- Marjo Matikainen, Finnish cross-country skier and politician, Olympic gold medallist and three time World Champion. Chairwoman of Karjalan Liitto 2011-2017
- Pentti Matikainen, Finnish hockey coach and general manager. Led Finland to silver medals in the 1988 Winter Olympics and the 1992 World Championships, and to third place in the 1991 Canada Cup
- Erkki Melartin, Finnish composer
- Veijo Meri, Finnish writer
- Hannu Mikkola, Finnish rally driver
- Lauri Mononen, Finnish ice hockey player
- Matti Mononen, Finnish pole vaulter
- Veikko Muronen, Finnish engineer
- Antti Muurinen, Finnish football coach
- Jonni Myyrä, Finnish javelin thrower, two time Olympic winner
- Jani Mäkelä, Finnish politician
- Jarmo Mäkinen, Finnish actor
- Anders Nevalainen, Finnish gold- and silversmith, and a Fabergé workmaster
- Yrjö Nikkanen, Finnish javelin thrower, Olympic silver medallist
- Lauri Nissinen, Finnish fighter ace
- Petteri Nokelainen, Finnish ice hockey player
- Sulo Nurmela, Finnish cross-country skier and Olympic winner
- Voldemar Oinonen, Finnish General
- Onni Okkonen, Finnish art historian
- Jukka Paarma, Finnish Archbishop
- Erkki Paavolainen, Finnish journalist and politician
- Jaakko Paavolainen, Finnish historian
- Olavi Paavolainen, Finnish writer
- Pekka Paavolainen, Finnish lawyer and politician
- Aaro Pajari, Finnish Major General
- Ari Pakarinen, Finnish javelin thrower
- Esa Pakarinen, Finnish actor
- Hanna Pakarinen, Finnish singer
- Iiro Pakarinen, Finnish ice hockey player
- Pia Pakarinen, Finnish actress
- Juho Paksujalka, Finnish politician
- Larin Paraske, Izhorian-Karelian rune singer
- Aki Parviainen, Finnish javelin thrower
- Urho Peltonen, Finnish javelin thrower, two time Olympic medallist
- Eino Penttilä, Finnish javelin thrower
- Arhippa Perttunen, Rune singer
- Kauko Pirinen, Finnish historian
- Antti Puhakka, Finnish poet
- Olli Puhakka, Finnish fighter ace
- Ari Puheloinen, Finnish general and former Chief of Defence
- Teemu Pukki, Finnish football player
- Anna Puu, Finnish singer
- Markku Pölönen, Finnish director
- Jussi Pylkkänen, Finnish art dealer
- Viljam Pylkäs, Finnish soldier and farmer
- Jaska Raatikainen, Finnish musician, former drummer and co-founder of the band Children of Bodom
- Väinö Raitio, Finnish composer
- Siiri Rantanen, Finnish cross country skier and Olympic winner
- Armi Ratia, Finnish entrepreneur, co-founder of Marimekko
- Oskari Reinikainen, Finnish physician and politician
- Lauri Kristian Relander, Finnish president from 1925 to 1931
- Ilkka Remes, Finnish writer
- Juuso Riikola, Finnish ice hockey player
- Jorma Rissanen, Finnish information theorist, and originator of the minimum description length principle
- Santtu-Matias Rouvali, Finnish conductor
- Kimi Räikkönen, Finnish F1 World Champion
- Arto Räty, Finnish general
- Seppo Räty, Finnish javelin thrower
- Matti Rönkä, Finnish writer
- Kaija Saariaho, Finnish composer
- Sylvi Saimo, Finnish politician and Olympic winner
- Sipe Santapukki, Finnish drummer
- Aulis Sallinen, Finnish composer
- Petri Sarvamaa, Finnish politician
- Pedri Shemeikka, Finnish rune singer
- Aarne Sihvo, Finnish general and former Chief of Defence
- Hannu Siitonen, Finnish javelin thrower. European champion and Olympic silver medallist
- Mikko Silvennoinen, Finnish television host, journalist and producer
- Anton Suurkonka, Finnish farmer, business executive, lay preacher and politician
- Juhani Suutarinen, Finnish biathlete
- Sten Suvio, Finnish boxer and Olympic winner
- Taiska, Finnish singer
- Jaakko Tallus, Finnish Nordic combined athlete and Olympic gold medallist
- Martti Talvela, Finnish operatic bass
- Penna Tervo, Finnish politician
- Einari Teräsvirta, Finnish gymnast, Olympic winner and architect
- Juha Tiainen, Finnish hammer thrower and Olympic winner
- Kimmo Tiilikainen, Finnish politician
- Reino Tolvanen, Finnish actor
- Ari Torniainen, Finnish politician
- Heikki Turunen, Finnish writer
- Tarja Turunen, Finnish singer-songwriter
- Aale Tynni, Finnish poet
- Lauri Törni, born in Viipuri, Törni was a soldier and winner of the Mannerheim Cross during the Continuation War, who later served with the German and American armies. Later known as Larry Thorne
- Riitta Uosukainen, Finnish politician, Counselor of State
- Urho Vaakanainen, Finnish ice hockey player
- Pasi Vainikka, Finnish scientist, CEO of Solar Foods
- Alisa Vainio, Finnish long-distance runner
- Jukka Vakkila, Finnish football manager
- Jorma Valkama, Finnish athlete, Olympic bronze medallist in long jump
- Väinö Valve, Finnish general
- Tatu Vanhanen, Finnish political scientist and author
- Matti Vanhanen, Finnish politician
- Ari Vatanen, Finnish politician and former rally driver
- Vesa Vierikko, Finnish actor
- Vesa Viitakoski, Finnish ice hockey player¨
- Lauri Vilkko, Finnish pentathlete and Olympic medallist
- Johannes Virolainen, Finnish politician, Counselor of State
- Emppu Vuorinen, Finnish musician
- Vilho Väisälä, Finnish meteorologist, physicist and founder of Vaisala
- Yrjö Väisälä, Finnish astronomer and physicist
- Stephen Wäkevä, Finnish silversmith and a Fabergé workmaster

== Other ethnic Karelians ==
- Mariya Smirnova, Soviet military pilot (Tver Karelian)
- Nikolay Abramov, Vepsian writer
- Boris Akbulatov, artist
- Pamela Anderson, Canadian-American actress and model
- Aleksandr Hudilainen, Ingrian politician
- Reino Häyhänen, Ingrian lieutenant colonel of Soviet Russia, spy, and defector to the United States
- Robert Ivanov, Russian-Ingrian football player
- Kristina Karjalainen, Karelian-Lithuanian model born in Estonia
- Aleksandr Kokko, Ingrian football player
- Leo Komarov, Finno-Russian ice hockey player in the National Hockey League
- Yelena Kondulainen, Ingrian actress
- Timothy Kopra, astronaut
- Robert Kurvitz, Estonian-Karelian novelist, musician, and video game developer
- Valeri Minkenen, Ingrian football player
- Matti Poikala, Swedish wrestler
- Roland Pöntinen, Ingrian-Swedish pianist and composer
- Elmo Nüganen, Estonian-Ingrian actor and director
- Hillar Rootare, Estonian-Ingrian physical chemist
- Jarmo Sandelin, Swedish golfer
- Vasili Vainonen, Ingrian choreographer
- Alina Voronkova, Russian-Ingrian model
