= Fabergé workmaster =

Independent craftsmen of the House of Fabergé

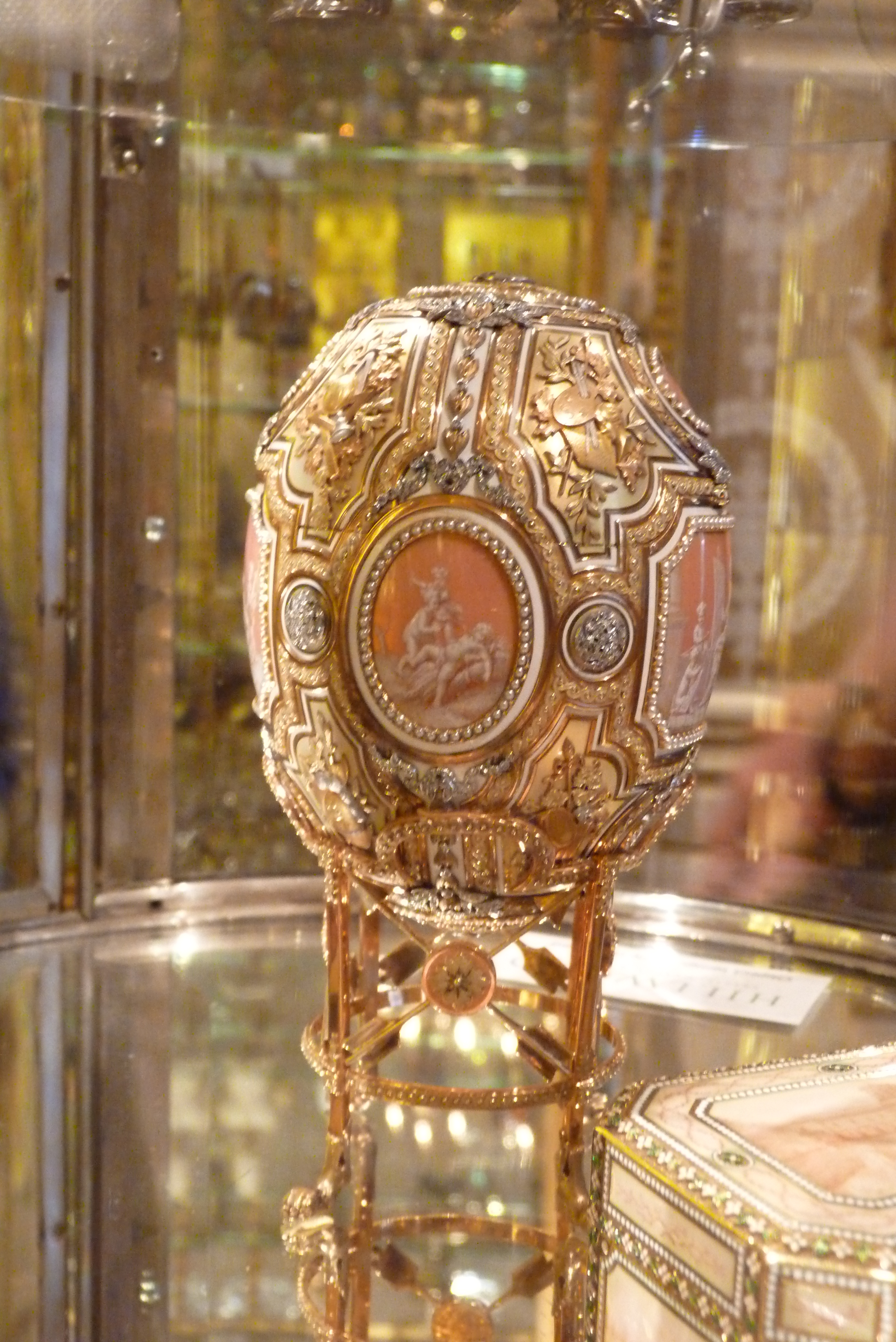
Catherine the Great (Fabergé egg), 1914. Workmaster Henrik Wigström and miniatures by Vasilii Zuiev. Surprise by Andrei Plotnitskii.

A Fabergé workmaster was a skilled craftsman who owned his own workshop and produced jewelry, silver or objets d'art for the House of Fabergé.

When Carl Fabergé took over the running of the business in 1882, its output increased so rapidly that the two Fabergé brothers could not manage the workshops themselves. They decided to establish independent workshops and the owners of these were committed to only work for the House of Fabergé, which would supply the sketches and models of the objects to be made.

Nothing would be accepted by the House unless it had been approved by either Carl or his appointed deputy. The House of Fabergé also employed its own designers. However, we also know from the memoirs of François Birbaum that were written in 1919 (Birbaum was Head Designer of the House of Fabergé from 1896 to 1917) that Carl also designed himself.

The workmasters presided over teams of craftsmen and were responsible for executing pieces conceived by the company's designers. The House of Fabergé was staffed with some of the finest goldsmiths and jewelers available.

It is often said that Fabergé did not make anything produced by the House of Fabergé. It is true that nothing has survived that can be said to have been the work of Carl Fabergé. His father, Gustav Fabergé (the founder of the House of Fabergé), ensured that his eldest son received the best possible training to take over the business. After Carl’s education in St. Petersburg, this was followed by a course at the Arts and Crafts School in Dresden, the city to which his parents had retired. He then embarked on an eight-year Grand Tour of Europe, where he received tuition from respected goldsmiths in Germany, France and England. The ‘apprenticeship’ with these goldsmiths would have resulted in Carl working at the bench and producing objects.

When Carl returned to the House of Fabergé in St. Petersburg during 1872, his father’s trusted workmaster, Finnish-born Hiskias Pendin, acted as his mentor and tutor. This would also have involved Carl working at the bench and producing objects. When he was awarded the title Master Goldsmith in 1882, his reputation was then so high that the usual three-day examination was waived; this would not have happened if he had never made anything.

The business was divided into several workshops, each with its own specialty. In addition to the fabulous easter eggs, the workshop also produced table silver, jewelry, European-style trinkets, and Russian-style carvings. The two master jewelers most responsible for making the Fabergé eggs were Michael Perchin and Finnish-born Henrik Wigström. Born in 1860, Perchin became the leading workmaster in the House of Fabergé in 1886 and supervised production of the eggs until 1903. Those eggs he was responsible for have his MP (MP- Michael Perchin) markings. All signed eggs made after 1903 bear Henrik Wigström's HW mark. Of course, not all eggs were stamped, so other goldsmiths may have supervised the production of some of the eggs. Altogether, there have been more than 40 workmasters.

== List of Fabergé workmasters ==
(This list is not complete.)

- The First Silver Artel (1896-1917). Fabergé commissioned many silver articles from the First Silver Artel. Mark is: '1CA'.
- Aarne, Johan Viktor (1863-1934) a Finnish workmaster whose signature is to be found on enameled gold and silver articles. Mark is 'VA' in Russian Cyrillic ('BA').
- Armfelt, Karl Gustaf Hjalmar (1873-1959) a Finnish workmaster, producing enameled objects for Fabergé until 1916. His mark is 'Ya A' in Cyrillic (ЯA).
- Gurianov, Andrei Gerasimovich, (date of birth and death unknown) carried on the workshop of Wilhelm Reimer after his death in c.1898. His mark is 'AG' in Cyrillic (AГ).
- Hollming, August Frederik (1854-1915) born in Loppi, Finland, a Finnish workmaster who worked for Faberge from 1880. His mark is 'A*H'.
- Holmström, Albert Woldemar (1876-1925) a Finnish workmaster, born in St. Petersburg. He was a son of August Holmström. Used the mark of 'AH' same as August Wilhelm Holmström.
- Holmström, August Wilhelm (1829-1903) a Finnish workmaster, born in Helsinki, Finland. Was appointed chief jeweler by Gustav Fabergé in 1857. His mark is 'AH'.
- Kollin, Erik August (1836-1901) Fabergé's Finnish head workmaster until 1886. His mark is 'E.K.'
- Krijitski, Konstantin (1858-1911) Ukrainian landscape painter and artist, painted miniatures for the Caucasus Egg and the Danish Palaces Egg.
- Mickelson, Anders (1839-1913) a Finnish workmaster who made gold cigarette cases and small enameled objects. His hallmark is 'AM'.
- Nevalainen, Anders/Antti (1858-1933), a Finnish workmaster, maker's mark 'AN'.
- Nykänen (Niukkanen), Gabriel (1854-1921) a Finnish workmaster from Pieksämäki. Had an independent workshop at the 39, Kazanskaya Street in St. Petersburg in the 1880s. Workmaster for Fabergé in 1889. Made small gold articles, enameled frames and cigarette cases from gold. His mark is 'GN' in Western script.
- Pendin, Hiskias (1823-1881) Finnish born workmaster of Gustav Fabergé. Apprentice in St. Petersburg in 1833, jeweler in 1840, partner at Fabergé in 1842.
- Perchin, Michael (Mihail Jevlampijevitch Perchin) (1860-1903) is the most famous of Fabergé's workmasters. He was responsible for the crafting of the imperial Easter eggs from 1885 or 1886 until his death in 1903. His hallmark appears on all but the first egg made during those years. Although he was initially trained by rural craftsmen and by the leading workmaster Erik Kollin, Perchin's mature work recalls elements of the Rococo and Louis XV styles. His hallmarks: 'M.P.' in Russian Cyrillic.
- Pihl, Alma (1888 Moscow – 1976 Helsinki), the other of the two female designers and one of the best known Finnish designer/workmaster who worked for Fabergé. Oskar Pihl's sister, granddaughter of August Holmström and niece of jewelry designer Aline Holmström at Fabergé. As a self trained designer she started to work for Fabergé in 1909. She designed the famous Winter Easter Egg in 1913 and Mosaic Easter Egg in 1914, which now belongs to the collection of H. M. the King Charles of Great Britain, and also many pieces of fine jewellery of which the most famous is a collection of snowflake jewellery.
- Pihl, Oskar W. (1890 Moscow – 1957 Helsinki), one of the Finnish head workmasters at The House of Fabergé, brother of Alma Pihl, grandson of August Holmström. Made small items of jewellery such as tie pin. His mark: 'OP'.
- Prakhov, Adrian (1846-1916) painted the icon of the Resurrection of Christ for the Red Cross Egg with Resurrection Triptych.
- Rappoport, Julius Alexander originally Isak Abramovich (1851-1917) from Kosnov Lithuania. Fabergé’s most important supplier of large silver objects, silver vessels and small animal sculptures in St. Petersburg. His mark is 'I.R.' in Cyrillic (I.P.).
- Reimer, Wilhelm Karl (d. circa 1898), born in Riga, Livonia / Pernau, Estonia. Made small enamel and gold objects. His master mark: 'W.R'. One of the first Gustav Fabergé´s masters. Followed by Alexander Gurianov.
- Ringe, Philip Theodor, (1824-1894) from Riga, Livonia. Had own workshop from 1893. Made objects in enameled gold and silver. His mark is 'T.R'. His widow Anna Karlovna Ringe (1840-1912) continued the business.
- Rückert, Feodor (1840-1917) from Alsace France, workmaster in Moscow, made cloisonné enamel articles for Fabergé. His mark is 'F.R.' in Cyrillic (Ф.Р.).
- Schramm, Edward (1850- before 1899) German born Fabergé workmaster, made cigarette cases and small gold jewellery.
- Soloviev, Vladimir/Vassily Fjodorovich, (date of birth and death unknown). His mark can be found under the enamel on pieces made for export to England. Made similar objects with Anders Mickelsson at Philip Theodor Ringe workshop after Anna Ringe 1912-. His mark is VS in Cyrillic ('BC'). Specialized in enameled gold and silver pens.
- Tillander, A., was a Finnish family business owned and managed by Alexander Edvard Tillander, father (1837-1918) and Alexander Theodor Tillander, son (1870-1943).
- Thielemann, Alfred Rudolf (1870-1909), born and died in St. Petersburg. Also father Carl Rudolf (d. 1910) and brother Otto (d. 1914) were goldsmiths. Active jeweller for Fabergé from 1880. Produced small trinkets and jewellery. His work was continued by his son Karl Rudolph Thielemann. The master mark was 'AT'.
- Wigström, Henrik (1862-1923), Finnish master, became head workmaster upon Michael Perchin's death in 1903, thereby assuming responsibility for the imperial Easter eggs. Wigström was particularly adept at designing cigarette cases, frames and figurines, which were produced in large number during the firm's most productive years. Wigström's style is characterized by echoes of the Louis XVI and Empire (style) periods. His hallmarks: 'H.W.'
- Alexander Väkevä, (1870-1957) a Finnish workmaster, Stefan Wäkevä's son. Master mark: 'A.W'.
- Konstantin Väkevä, (1868-1902) a Finnish workmaster, Stefan Wäkevä's son. Master mark: 'K.W'.
- Wäkevä, Stefan, (1833-1910) a Finnish workmaster from 1856. His and his son's (Alexander Väkevä) initials can be found on a number of Fabergé silver pieces. He specialised in large silver items and tableware. His mark is 'S.W' in Latin script.
- Zehngraf, Johannes (1857-1908) was a Danish born court miniaturist and chief miniature painter for Fabergé and decorated the Lilies of the Valley Egg.
- Vassily Zuiev (active 1908-1917) possibly succeeded Zehngraf as chief miniature painter and painted on enamels as well as ivory. An important example of his work is the Fifteenth Anniversary Egg.

== See also ==
- Victor Mayer, a German jewelry manufacturing company that was appointed work master first by Fabergé & Cie in 1979 and then by the Unilever company in 1989. The firm's mark is 'VM'.
- Fabergé History: World of Fabergé.
