= Akbulatov =

Akbulatov (variants: Akbolatov, Akhbulatov, Akhbolatov) is a family name of Turkic origin under the influence of Russian language, with the meaning "son of Akbulat": ak="white" + bulat="steel" + ov=a Slavic language possessive suffix.

Akbulatov may refer to:

- Edkham Akbulatov, a Russian politician
- Boris Akbulatov, a Russian artist
- Aslambek Akbulatov, former state secretary of the Chechen Republic of Ichkeria
