= Paavolainen =

Paavolainen is a Finnish language patronymic surname derived from the first name Paavo. It was a protected surname. Notable people with the surname include:

- Erkki Paavolainen (1890–1930), Finnish journalist, educationist and politician
- Jaakko Paavolainen (1927–2007), Finnish historian
- Olavi Paavolainen (1903–1964), Finnish writer, essayist and poet
- Pekka Paavolainen (1868–1930), Finnish lawyer, civil servant and politician
