= Philip Theodor Ringe =

Russian silversmith

Philip Theodor Ringe (c. 1824 - 1882) was a Livonian silversmith and jeweler and a Fabergé workmaster. He was born in Riga in Livonia in about 1824. He was head of a small workshop at 12 Malaya Morskaya producing modest enameled articles (seals, parasol handles, thermometers, beltbuckles, miniature easter eggs, sweet boxes) in gold and silver. He was an outworker for Fabergé with the mark 'T.R'. After his death, in 1894, his widow Anna Karlovna Ringe (1840–1912) was the head of the workshop, but soon Anders Mickelson and Vassily Soloviev ran it first as assistants, and independently from 1912.
