= Pylkkänen =

Pylkkänen is a Finnish surname. Notable people with the surname include:

- Jussi Pylkkänen (born 1963), Finnish art dealer
- Paavo Pylkkänen (born 1959), Finnish philosopher of mind
- Tauno Pylkkänen (1918–1988), Finnish composer
