= Nevalainen =

Nevalainen is a Finnish surname. Notable people with the surname include:

- Anders Nevalainen (1848–1933) Finnish-Russian Fabergé workmaster
- Esko Nevalainen (1925–2008), Finnish film cinematographer
- Frida Nevalainen (born 1987), Swedish ice hockey player
- Jukka Nevalainen (born 1978), Finnish symphonic metal drummer
- Lauri Nevalainen (1927–2005), Finnish rower
- Liisa Nevalainen (1916–1987), Finnish actress
