= Henrik Wigström =

Finnish jeweller (1862–1923)

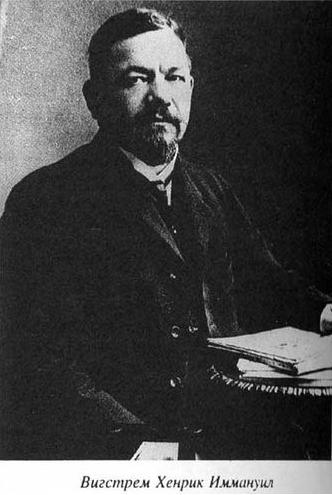
- Born: 2 October 1862
- Died: 14 March 1923 (aged 60)
- Known for: one of the most important Fabergé workmasters

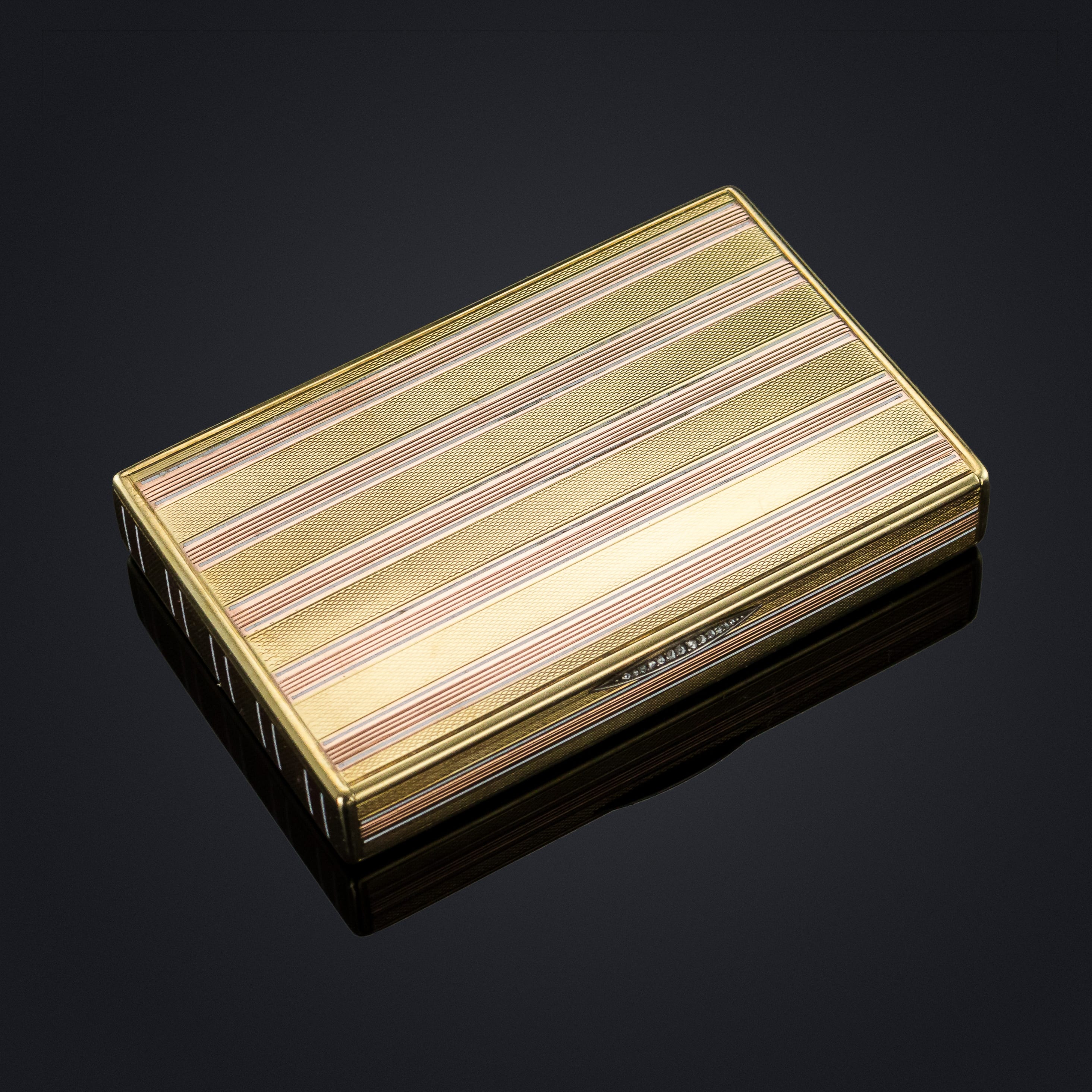
A 20thC Russian Faberge Jewelled Two-Color Gold & Enamel Case

Henrik Immanuel Wigström (2 October 1862 – 14 March 1923) was a Finnish silver and goldsmith. He was one of the most important Fabergé workmasters, along with Michael Perchin. Perchin was the head workmaster from 1886 until his death in 1903, when he was succeeded by his chief assistant Henrik Wigström. These two workmasters were responsible for almost all the imperial Easter eggs.

Erik August Kollin, a Finn, was head work master from 1870 to 1886 and produced gold jewellery, including pieces in the Scythian style (the Scythian treasure had just been discovered at Kerch in the Crimea). August Wilhelm Holmström (who had been appointed head jeweller by Gustav Faberge in 1857) was born in Ekenäs, Finland.

== Career ==
Henrik Wigström was born in Ekenäs, Finland, and was apprenticed to a local Danish born goldsmith named Petter Madsén, a successful manufacturer of silverware who was familiar with the jewellery trade in St. Petersburg, as at one time he had had a workshop there. Once in Madsén's employment, his master's trade with Russia, as well as his numerous business contacts here, brought him to work in St. Petersburg. Goldsmith Werner Elfström employed Wigström as a apprentice on his arrival in the capital in 1875. Wigström became assistant in 1884, at the age of 22, to Perchin, whose shop at that time was already working exclusively for Fabergé.

Wigström became head workmaster at Fabergé after Perchin's death in 1903. The number of craftsmen in Wigström's workshop diminished drastically with the outbreak of World War I. By 1918, the Revolution forced the complete closing of the House of Fabergé. Aged 56, Wigström retreated almost empty-handed to his summer house, on Finnish territory, and died at Terijoki in 1923.

His art is similar to Perchin's but tends to be in the Louis XVI, Empire, or neo-classical style. Nearly all the Fabergé hardstone animals, figures and flowers from that time period were produced under his supervision.
