= Myles Fenton =

English railway manager (1830–1918)

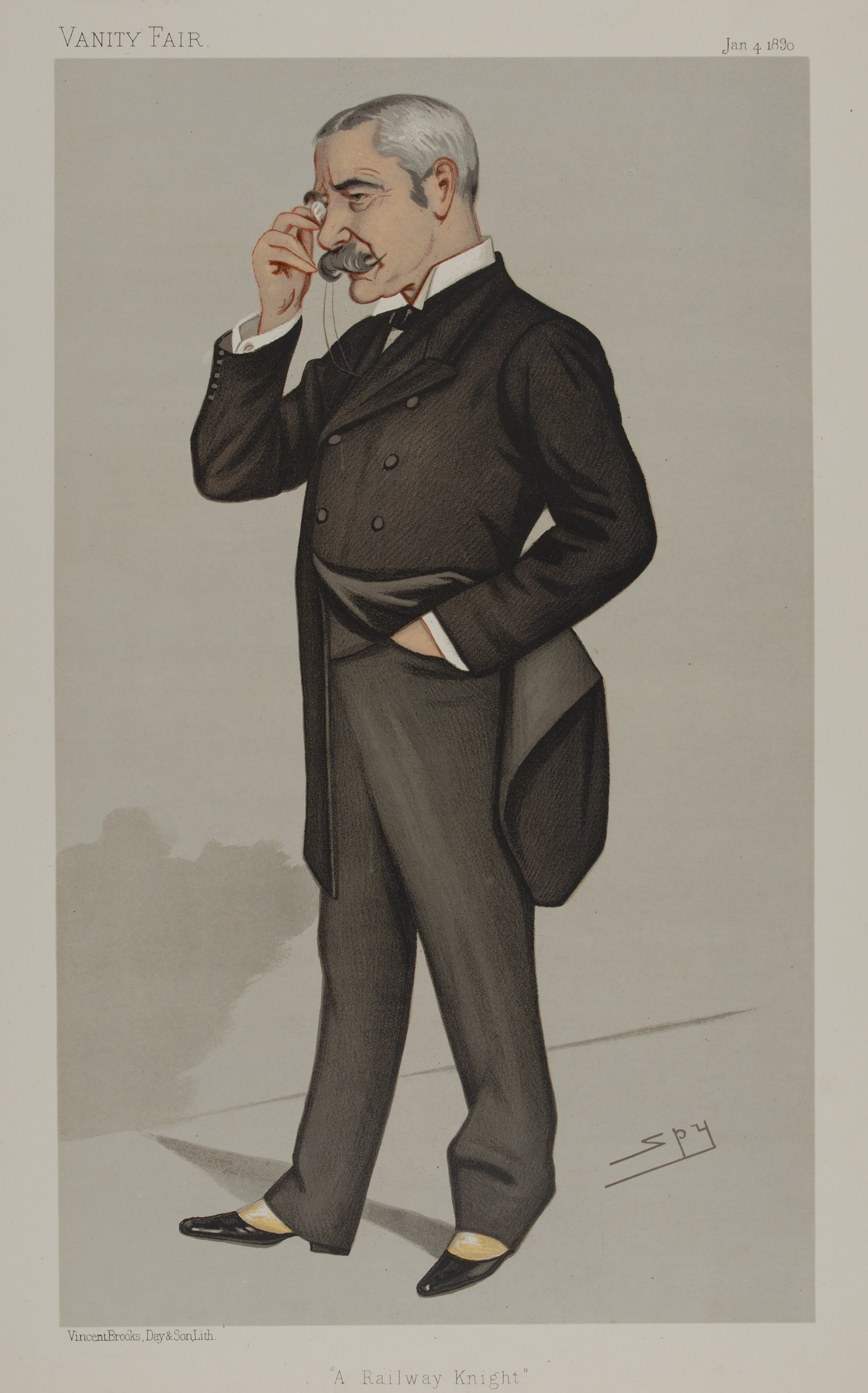
Fenton by "Spy" in Vanity Fair, 1890

Sir Myles Fenton (1830 – 14 March 1918) was general manager of the Metropolitan Railway and the South-Eastern Railway, and a Justice of the Peace in Westmorland.

A son of Myles Fenton, of Kendal, at the age of fifteen he joined the Kendal and Windermere Railway as an office boy and from there transferred to the East Lancashire Railway. After working for several other companies, in 1855 he returned to the East Lancashire as Secretary and was soon assistant manager of the Lancashire and Yorkshire Railway. From 1862 to 1880 he was manager of the new Metropolitan Railway and was then appointed as general manager of the South-Eastern Railway. In 1899, when a scheme of co-operation with the London, Chatham and Dover Railway created the South Eastern and Chatham Railway, he remained as general manager of the South Eastern and was also made a director of the new company.

Fenton was commissioned into the Engineer and Railway Staff Volunteer Corps, in which he rose to the rank of lieutenant-colonel, and was appointed as a Justice of the Peace for the county of his birth, Westmorland.

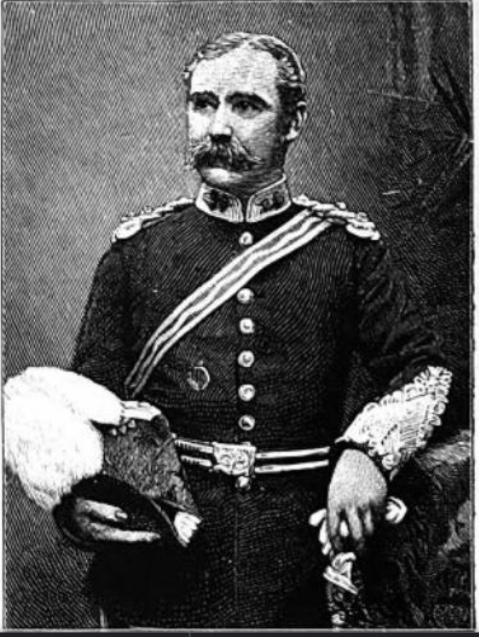
Fenton in uniform in 1883

In 1883, at St George's, Hanover Square, he married Charlotte Jane Oakes, the widow of John Collins, gaining some step-children. They settled at Ridge Green, South Nutfield, Surrey.

In 1888, Fenton was knighted by Queen Victoria, becoming the first railway manager so honoured. He also became a Chevalier of the Belgian Order of Leopold and the French Legion of Honour. In 1894 the Russian Czar Alexander III presented him with a Fabergé silver beaker made by Julius Rappoport.

Fenton died at home, Redstone Hall, Redhill, in March 1918, aged 87, after two years of ill health. In 1923, his widow, still living at Redstone Hall, married thirdly Alderman J. H. Ellis, of Rhyl, when the Daily Chronicle reported that she was a smiling bride at the age of seventy.
