= Karl Gustaf Hjalmar Armfeldt =

Fabergé workmaster

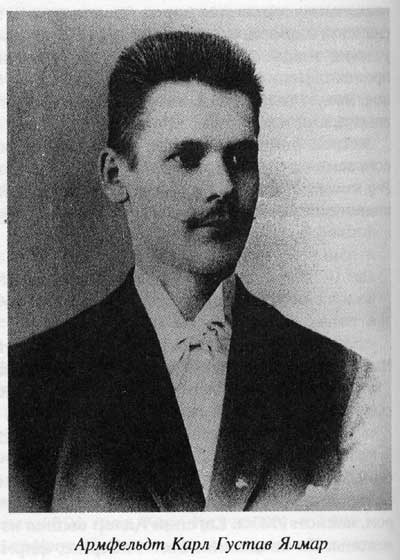
- Armfeldt in the 1910s
- Born: April 6, 1873; Artjärvi, Finland
- Died: July 7, 1959 (aged 86)
- Other names: Karl Gustav Hjalmar Armfelt
- Occupations: silversmith, Fabergé workmaster
- Known for: Fabergé master

Karl Gustaf (Gustav) Hjalmar Armfeldt (also spelled Armfelt; 6 April 1873 – 7 July 1959) was a Finnish silversmith and Fabergé workmaster. He was born in Artjärvi, Finland.

In 1886, at age 13, he was apprenticed to the Finnish silversmith Paul Sohlman (1898–1904) in St. Petersburg at 42 Gorohovaya Street. He became a journeyman in 1891. He studied at the art school for five years until 1894. He worked as Fabergé's workmaster beginning in 1895, and used the mark ЯА. Armfeldt also worked under the silversmith Antti (Anders) Nevalainen and became his closest assistant in 1901.

He became a master in 1904 and was given the exclusive opportunity to buy the workshop of Johan Victor Aarne. Armfeldt produced objects for Fabergé until 1916, working on projects like those of Johan Viktor Aarne, like tiny gem-set frames, silver-mounted birchwood frames, hardstone frames, gem-set enameled gold articles and silver figures on hardstone base.

Armfeldt moved to Finland in 1920. He worked in Helsinki at Oy Taito Ab from 1922 and as a technical director and designer at Kultakeskus Oy 1925–1937, at Kunniamerkkikeskus from 1940 and at Hopeatakomo from 1945. Armfeldt died 7 July 1959.
