= Reijo Tossavainen =

Finnish politician

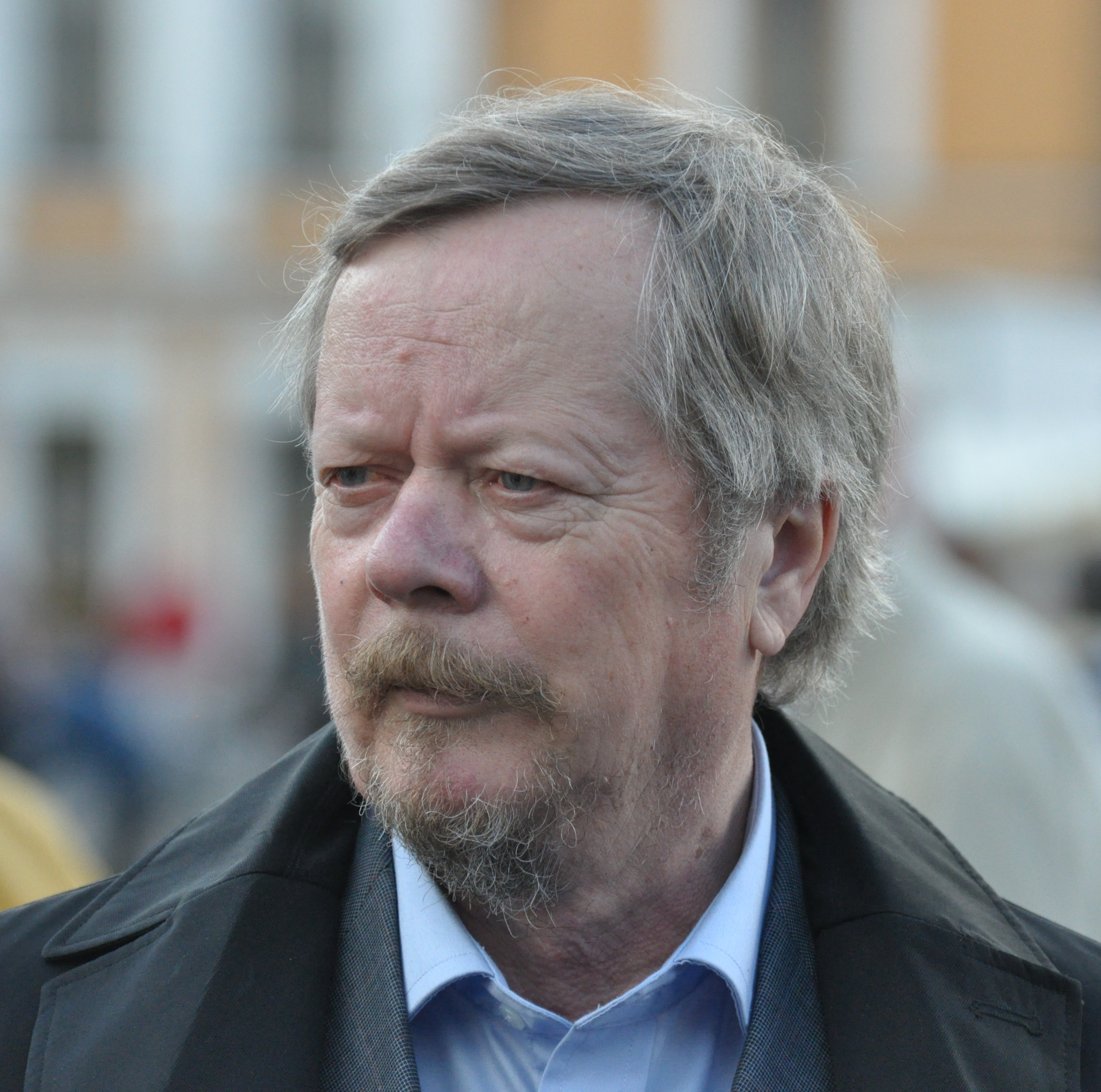

Member of Finnish Parliament for Kymi
- In office 20 April 2011 – 21 April 2015

Personal details
- Born: 13 November 1948 (age 77) Kiuruvesi, Finland
- Party: The Finns Party
- Occupation: ex-publisher free writer
- Website: http://www.reijotossavainen.net

Reijo Tossavainen (born 13 November 1948 in Kiuruvesi, Northern Savonia) is a Finnish politician and a member of the True Finns.

He represented the constituency of Kymi in the Parliament of Finland for the 2011 parliamentary election. In 2015 Tossavainen did not seek re-election.

== Work and life ==
Reijo Tossavainen was a managing director and owner of the Valkealan Sanomat newspaper, which he sold. He did not stop writing since then. He is keeping a weblog in Uusi Suomi web publication. He has been a chairman of the entrepreneurial society and home region society. He lives in two places: Kouvola and Savitaipale.

== Political career ==
In the 2011 parliamentary election, the list of the True Finns polled 23.27% (39.357 votes) and won three of the twelve seats in the electoral district of Kymi. Reijo Tossavainen polled 5,725 votes (3.39%) during the personal vote.

He represented the constituency of Kymi in the Finnish parliament. He was a member of three parliamentary committees until April 2015: transport and communications (since 3 May 2011), agriculture and forestry (3 May 2011), broadcasting Ltd. board (since 30 June 2011).

== Political mandate ==
- MP of the constituency of Kymi 20 April 2011 - 21 April 2015
