= Paavilainen =

Paavilainen is a Finnish surname. Notable people with the surname include:

- Simo Paavilainen (born 1944), Finnish architect
- Jorma Paavilainen (born 1960), Finnish chess problemist

== See also ==
- Paavolainen
