= The Absinthe Drinkers =

The Absinthe Drinker or The Absinthe Drinkers may refer to:

- The Absinthe Drinkers (film), a 2015 film
- The Absinthe Drinker (Manet), a painting by Édouard Manet
- Portrait of Angel Fernandez de Soto or The Absinthe Drinker, a painting by Pablo Picasso
- The Absinthe Drinker, a painting by Viktor Oliva

== See also ==
- L'Absinthe, a painting by Edgar Degas
