= Anna-Kaarina Aalto =

Finnish physician and politician (1920–1994)

Anna-Kaarina Aalto MP
- Aalto c. 1958

Member of Parliament for Kymi
- In office 2 February 1971 – 21 January 1972

Personal details
- Born: 12 August 1920 Toivakka, Finland
- Died: 16 April 1994 (aged 73) Lappeenranta, Finland
- Party: National Coalition Party
- Spouse: Risto Aalto
- Education: University of Helsinki

Anna-Kaarina Aalto (12 August 1920 – 16 April 1994) was a Finnish physician and politician who served in the Parliament of Finland from 1971 until 1972. A member of the National Coalition Party, she represented the Kymi constituency. Aalto was a prominent figure in South Karelia, well-regarded for her medical practice and public service. She was a member of the Lappeenranta city council for nearly forty years.

== Biography ==
Anna-Kaarina Aalto was born on 12 August 1920 in Toivakka, Finland. After graduating from high school in 1938, she began studying medicine at the University of Helsinki, though her studies were interrupted by Finnish entry into World War II. During the war, Aalto served in the Finnish Blood Service (Veripalvelu), and was a doctor at military hospitals. She received a Bachelor of Medicine degree in 1943, and a licentiate in medicine in 1947.

Aalto began her medical practice in 1948. Initially working as a school doctor and counselor, she later established her own private medical practice along with her husband, serving the city of Lappeenranta and the surrounding towns. Aalto's medical practice led to her becoming highly regarded in the South Karelia region; the newspaper Helsingin Sanomat wrote that the community's level of trust in her was so high that "the name Aalto became synonymous with doctor in many homes", and recalled an instance where she breastfed the infant of a patient suffering from mastitis. (Note: Aalto had been lactating due to the recent birth of her own child.)

In additional to her medical practice, Aalto was also socially and politically involved, and was considered to hold influence among several local and national boards. She was also a member of several temperance organizations and women's groups, including the Finnish Women's Sobriety Center and the Sobriety Friends Association, serving as president of the former. Throughout her life, Aalto advocated particularly strongly for single mothers, who she felt were being "accused of increasing juvenile delinquency". A member of the National Coalition Party, Aalto was a member of the Lappeenranta city council for almost forty years. In February 1971, she was appointed to the Parliament of Finland following the death of incumbent Juha Rihtniemi; Aalto had previously been designated his substitute, and so served out the remainder of Rihtniemi's term. Aalto represented the Kymi constituency until the end of her term in January 1972. While in parliament, she was a member of the Committee on Agriculture and Forestry.

Aalto retired from her medical practice in 1983. She died on 16 April 1994 in Lappeenranta.

== Bibliography ==
- Tyrskyä ja tyventä naisen tiellä (A Bump in the Road for a Woman) (1958)
