= Sari Palm =

Finnish politician

Member of the Parliament of Finland
- In office March 21, 2007 – April 21, 2015

Personal details
- Born: May 17, 1966 (age 59); Valkeala, Kymenlaakso, Finland
- Political party: Christian Democrats
- Occupation: Teacher

Sari Palm is a Finnish politician and a member of the Parliament of Finland between 2007 and 2015 representing Kymi.

== Career ==
Palm was a Member of Parliament between 2007 and 2015. She was a member of the Education and Culture Committee, the Employment and Equality Committee, the Environment Committee and the Advisory Council of the Finnish Institute of International Affairs. Palm has previously been a member of the Grand Committee, the Defence Committee, the Working Subcommittee of the Grand Committee, the Transport and Communications Committee and the Board of the Library of Parliament.
