= Paavali =

Paavali is a Finnish masculine given name, a Finnish form of the given name Paul. Notable people with the name include:

- Joni Juho Paavali Puurula (born 1982), Finnish ice hockey player
- Jorma Vilho Paavali Kinnunen (1941–2019), Finnish athlete, mainly javelin thrower
- Kimmo Paavali Kinnunen (born 1968), Finnish javelin thrower
- Leo Paavali Jokela (1927–1975), Finnish actor
- Paavali Halonen (fl. 1590s), farmer and settler in Finnish Lapland
- Paavali Juusten (c. 1516/1520–1575), Swedish Royal envoy, Bishop of Viipuri, and Bishop of Turku
- Paavali Jumppanen (born 1974), Finnish pianist
- Paavali (Olmari) of Finland (1914–1988), Finnish Archbishop

== See also ==
- Paavo, Pauli, other Finnish forms of the name
