= Paavo =

Male given name

Paavo is an Estonian and Finnish masculine given name, cognate to "Paul". The Finnish patronymic surname Paavolainen is derived from it.

It may refer to:

- Paavo Aaltonen (1919–1962), Finnish gymnast and a three-time Olympic champion
- Paavo Aarniokoski (1893–1961), Finnish politician
- Paavo Aho (1891–1918), Finnish track and field athlete who competed in the 1912 Summer Olympics
- Paavo Arhinmäki (born 1976), Finnish politician, former Minister for Culture and Sport and a former member of the Finnish Parliament
- Paavo Berg (1911–1941), Finnish fighter ace
- Paavo Berglund (1929–2012), Finnish conductor
- Paavo Cajander (1846–1913), Finnish poet and translator
- Paavo Haavikko (1931–2008), Finnish poet and playwright
- Paavo Heininen (1938–2022), Finnish composer and pianist
- Paavo Hukkinen (1911–1988), German-Finnish actor
- Paavo Hynninen (1883–1960), former Finnish diplomat, Minister of Foreign Affairs
- Paavo Järvi (born 1962), Estonian-American conductor, and current music director of the Orchestre de Paris
- Paavo Johansson (1895–1983), Finnish athlete who competed mainly in the javelin throw
- Paavo Korhonen (1928–2019), Finnish Nordic skier who competed in the 1950s
- Paavo Kotila (1927–2014), former Finnish long-distance runner, Olympian, and thrice national champion in the marathon
- Paavo Lötjönen (born 1968), cello player for Finnish band Apocalyptica
- Paavo Liettu (1905–1964), Finnish track and field athlete who competed in the 1928 Summer Olympics
- Paavo Lipponen (born 1941), Finnish politician and former reporter
- Paavo Lonkila (1923–2017), Finnish farmer and cross-country skier who competed in the 1940s and 1950s
- Paavo Lukkariniemi (born 1941), Finnish ski jumper who competed in the mid-1960s
- Paavo Matsin (born 1970), Estonian writer and literary critic
- Paavo Miettinen (1919–1985), Finnish Olympic fencer
- Paavo Nikula (1942–2024), Chancellor of Justice of Finland and a Member of the Parliament of Finland
- Paavo Nõgene (born 1980), Estonian government official
- Paavo Nurmi (1897–1973), Finnish runner
- Paavo Piironen (1943–1974), Finnish film actor, director and writer of the 1960s and early 1970s
- Paavo Puurunen (born 1973), Finnish biathlete
- Paavo Pylkkänen (born 1959), Finnish philosopher of mind
- Paavo Rantanen (born 1934), former Finnish Foreign Ministry official, briefly the Minister for Foreign Affairs
- Paavo Ruotsalainen (1777–1852), Finnish farmer and lay preacher
- Paavo Siljamäki, (born 1977), Finnish trance artist, one-third of the UK based trance group Above & Beyond
- Paavo Susitaival (1896–1993), Finnish author, soldier and politician
- Paavo Talvela (1897–1973), Finnish soldier and a Knight of the Mannerheim Cross
- Paavo Vallius (born 1949), Swedish politician
- Paavo Vaskio (1931–2012), Finnish sprint canoeist who competed in the early 1960s
- Paavo Väyrynen (born 1946), Finnish veteran politician of the Centre Party
- Paavo Vierto (1915–1941), Finnish ski jumper who competed in the early 1940s
- Paavo Virkkunen (1874–1959), Finnish conservative politician
- Paavo Yrjölä (1902–1980), Finnish track and field athlete, won the gold medal in the decathlon at the 1928 Olympics

== See also ==
- Paavo, a Life in Five Courses, a 2010 Finnish-American documentary film
- Paavali
