= Valkeala =

Former municipality of Finland, now part of Kouvola

Coordinates: 60°56′20″N 26°47′50″E

Location of Valkeala in Finland

Coat of Arms of Valkeala

Valkeala is a former municipality of Finland.

It is located in the province of Southern Finland, and is a neighborhood of city of Kouvola, and it was a part of the Kymenlaakso region. The municipality had a population of 11,238 (2003) and covered an area of 1,004.40 km² of which 143.47 km² was water. The population density was 13.1 inhabitants per km².

In the Valkeala region there is the lake Vekaranjärvi near which the Karelia Brigade is located.

Valkeala is famous for Repovesi National Park.

The municipality was unilingually Finnish.

As of 2009, the six municipalities – Kouvola, Kuusankoski, Elimäki, Anjalankoski, Valkeala and Jaala – were consolidated, accounting for the new municipality of Kouvola with a population of over 80,000, being the 10th largest city in Finland.

== People born in Valkeala ==
- Anton Suurkonka (1886 – 1964)
- Paavo Karjalainen (1904 – 1978)
- Arvo Askola (1909 – 1975)
- Kauko Andersson (1913 – 1979)
- Heikki Hykkäälä (1914 – 1995)
- Sulo Suorttanen (1921 – 2005)
- Markku Laukkanen (born 1950)
- Ari Sihvola (born 1957)
- Sari Palm (born 1966)
- Mika Orasmaa (born 1976)
- Tuomas Kansikas (born 1981)
- Visa Hongisto (born 1987)
- Vili Sopanen (born 1987)
- Sami Tamminen (born 1997)
