= Heikki Hykkäälä =

Finnish civil servant and politician

Heikki Kalervo Hykkäälä (16 August 1914, in Valkeala – 1 August 1995) was a Finnish civil servant and politician. He was a member of the Parliament of Finland from 1948 to 1958 and again from 1966 to 1975, representing the Social Democratic Party of Finland (SDP).
