= Portrait of Angel Fernández de Soto =

Painting by Pablo Picasso

- The Absinthe Drinker (English), Portrait bleu de Angel Fernández de Soto (French)
- Artist: Pablo Picasso
- Year: 1903
- Medium: Oil on canvas
- Movement: Picasso's Blue Period, Expressionism
- Dimensions: 70.3 cm × 55.3 cm (27.67 in × 21.75 in)
- Location: Private collection

Portrait of Angel Fernández de Soto (also known as The Absinthe Drinker) (French: Portrait bleu de Angel Fernández de Soto) is a portrait by Spanish artist Pablo Picasso completed in 1903 during his Blue Period. The oil painting depicts Picasso's friend and fellow painter, Angel Fernandez de Soto, in a bar with a glass of absinthe. The painting was previously owned by musical theatre composer Andrew Lloyd Webber. On 23 June 2010, the painting was sold at auction for £34.7 million.

== Background ==
Portrait of Angel Fernández de Soto is a study of a young Spanish artist sitting in a bar, shrouded in tobacco smoke from a pipe, with a glass of absinthe in front of him. The young man, Fernández de Soto, was Picasso's friend and was usually referred to as an "amusing wastrel", as he enjoyed drinking and partying. Picasso met Fernández de Soto in 1899 and they twice shared studios in Barcelona. The portrait gives an insight into the life of Picasso and his circle of friends, and Picasso immortalized Fernández de Soto in several of his paintings, some of which are now held in the Museu Picasso in Barcelona. Fernández de Soto was later killed in the Spanish Civil War.

The Andrew Lloyd Webber Art Foundation purchased the painting for £18 million at a Sotheby's auction in New York City in 1995. The painting was included in a selection of works from Lloyd Webber's collection, which was exhibited at London's Royal Academy of Arts in 2003.

== Dispute over ownership ==
In 2006, Lloyd Webber announced that he would be selling Portrait of Angel Fernandez de Soto at auction for charity. However, the painting was withdrawn from auction after a claim that the previous owner was forced to sell it under duress from the Nazi regime in Germany. The previous owner's family reached an out-of-court settlement with the Andrew Lloyd Webber Foundation, which allowed the foundation to retain ownership of the painting and to be free to sell the work.

== 2010 auction ==
In March 2010, it was announced that Lloyd Webber had made the decision to auction off the painting to benefit his arts, culture and heritage charity foundation. The painting was to be included in a Christie's auction of Impressionist and Modern art in London on 23 June 2010.

The painting became the most highly estimated work of art to be offered at auction in Europe, with a pre-sale estimate of between £30–40 million. Jussi Pylkkänen, president of Christie's Europe division said the painting is "one of the most important works of art to be offered at auction in decades". On 23 June 2010, the painting came to auction and was sold for £34.7 million to an anonymous telephone bidder.
