= August Frederik Hollming =

Faberge workmaster (1854–1915)

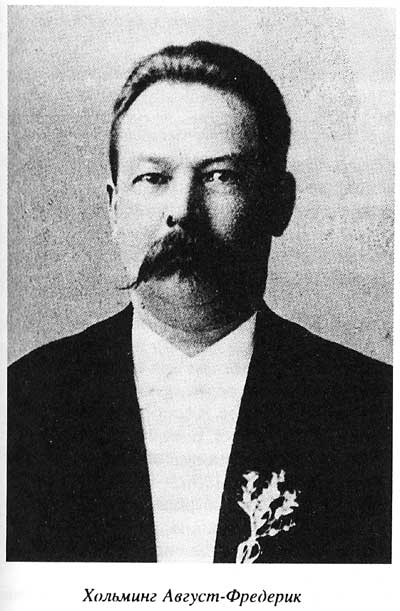
- Born: 3 December, 1854; Loppi, Grand Duchy of Finland, Russian Empire
- Died: 1913
- Partner: Erika Gustava Abrahamsson
- Children: 4, including August Väinö
- Parents: Anders Gustaf Hollming of Lovisa (father); Katarina Petterson of Nykarleby (mother)
- Relatives: Anders (brother); Axel (brother)

August Frederik Hollming or Golming (3 December 1854 – 1913) was a Finnish silver- and goldsmith, and a Fabergé workmaster.

== Life ==
Hollming was born in Loppi, in Grand Duchy of Finland, the son of a bookkeeper, Anders Gustaf Hollming of Lovisa, and of Katarina Petterson of Nykarleby. Hollming was apprenticed to the goldsmith Carl Friedrich Ekholm in Helsinki at the beginning of the 1870s. In 1876, he settled in St. Petersburg and registered as a goldworker.

In 1880, he qualified as a master and opened his workshop at 35 Kazanskaya Street; he was soon thereafter hired by Fabergé. He had three sons with Erika Gustava Abrahamsson (1856—1909). In 1900, the Hollming workshop moved to 24 Bolshaya Morskaya, under the same roof as Fabergé. He mainly produced cigarette cases in silver, gold, and enamel; miniature Easter Eggs; and small gem-set, enameled jewels such as cufflinks, brooches, and pins. Many times he produced these objects for the House of Fabergé. The design of the jewelry was surprisingly modern and ahead of its time.

The eldest son August Väinö Hollming (1885—1934) inherited the workshop after his father's death in 1913. He ran the workshop with Otto Hanhinen, his father's assistant until 1915.

== In popular culture ==
In 2016 his work figured prominently on the British TV series, Antiques Roadshow, when four buttons he made, that were at the bottom of a box someone bought for £2.26, were valued at £1,000 to £1,500.
