= Kauko Andersson =

Finnish politician (1913–1979)

Kauko Kalervo Andersson (1 January 1913, Valkeala – 21 April 1979) was a Finnish electrician, civil servant and politician. He was a member of the Parliament of Finland from 1939 to 1948 and again for a short period from February to July 1951, representing the Social Democratic Party of Finland (SDP).
