= Jaakko Paavolainen =

Finnish historian (1926–2007)

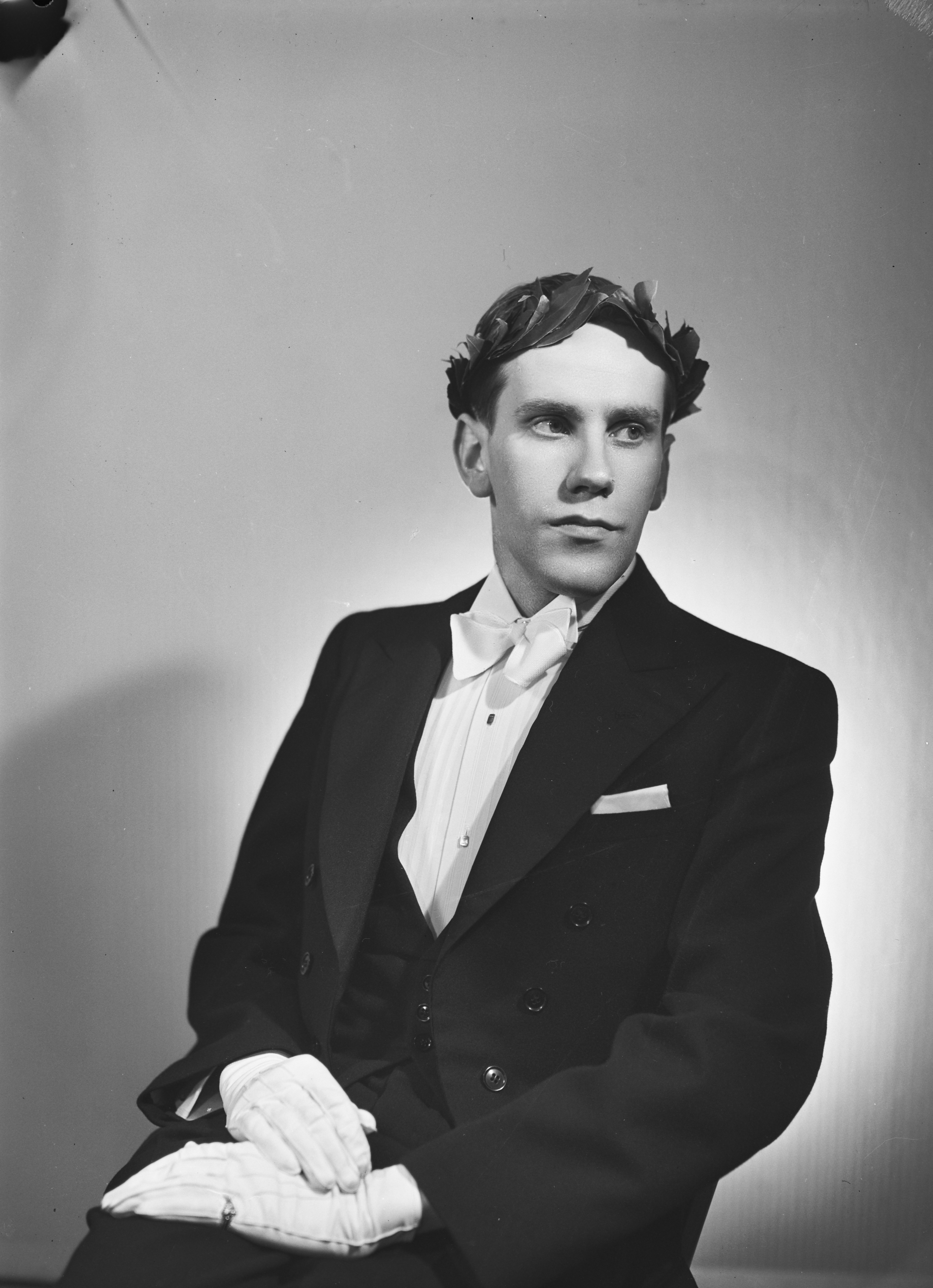
- Paavolainen in 1950
- Born: July 23, 1926; Kanneljärvi, Viborg Province (Finland)|Viborg Province, Finland
- Died: October 30, 2007 (aged 81); Helsinki, Finland
- Education: University of Helsinki
- Known for: Research on the Finnish Civil War and biographies of Väinö Tanner
- Children: Pentti Paavolainen
- Parent: Erkki Paavolainen (father)
- Scientific career
- Fields: Political history, Finnish history
- Workplaces: University of Turku; University of Helsinki

Jaakko Paavolainen (23 July 1926 in Kanneljärvi – 30 October 2007 in Helsinki), was a Finnish historian, PhD 1966. He became professor in history at the University of Turku 1986–1989.

Jaakko Paavolainen published his much noticed results about the red terror and white terror during the Finnish Civil War in three volumes and has also published a biography of Väinö Tanner (4 parts, 1977–1989). His boyhood memories från Carelia he pictures in Lapsuus Kanneljärvellä (1982) and the life of his cousin Olavi Paavolainen in a 1992 published volume.

Jaakko Paavolainen is the son of Erkki Paavolainen and the father of Pentti Paavolainen (b. 1953), professor in arts research at Helsinki Theatre Academy.

== Bibliography ==
- Haldane-neuvottelut v. 1912 (1948)
- Karjalainen elämäkerrasto (1961)
- Poliittiset väkivaltaisuudet Suomessa 1918, osa 1: Punainen terrori (1966)
- Poliittiset väkivaltaisuudet Suomessa 1918, osa 2: Valkoinen terrori (1967)
- Vankileirit Suomessa 1918 (1971)
- Suomen kansallinen murhenäytelmä: Punainen ja valkoinen terrori ja vankileirit v. 1918 (1974)
- Linkomiehen komiteasta uuteen Akatemiaan: Valtion tieteellisten toimikuntien 60-luku (1975)
- Väinö Tanner, osa 1: Nuori Tanner, menestyvä sosialisti. Elämäkerta vuoteen 1911 (1977)
- Väinö Tanner, osa 2: Senaattori ja rauhantekijä. Elämäkerta vuosilta 1912–1923 (1979)
- Lapsuus Kanneljärvellä (1982)
- Röd och vit terror: Finlands nationella tragedi och fånglägren 1918 (1986)
- Väinö Tanner, osa 3: Sillanrakentaja. Elämäkerta vuosilta 1924–1936 (1984)
- Väinö Tanner, osa 4: Patriootti. Elämäkerta vuosilta 1937–1966 (1989)
- Helsingin kaupunginvaltuuston historia, osa 2: 1919–1976 (1989)
- Olavi Paavolainen: Keulakuva (1991)
- Kanneljärven opisto 100 vuotta (1994, with Teuvo Moisio)
