= Akbulat =

Akbulat (variants: Akbolat, Akhbolat, Ahbolat, Aqbulat, Aq-bulat, Ak-bulat) is a Turkic language first name: ak="white" + bulat="steel".

Akbulat may refer to:

- Akbulat, the main character of the 1832 poem Aul Bastundzhi by Mikhail Lermontov
