= Lyudmila Markianova =

Karelian linguist

Lyudmila Fyodorovna Markianova (Russian: Людмила Фёдоровна Маркианова) (born 14 July 1941, Suarikoski, Olonets Karelia, Soviet Union) is a Karelian linguist and a professor emerita. She has been called "karjalan kielen muamo", i.e. 'mother of the Karelian language'.

== Biography and career ==
=== Early years and education ===
Markianova's parents were both Olonets Karelians. Her father disappeared at the beginning of the Second World War (later was found out that he was convicted of questioning officers' actions and sent to a prison camp), and when the Finnish Armed Forces conquered much of Russian Karelia, her mother Anna was obliged to work for the Finns in an army laundry. There she met a Finnish soldier, with whom she got married, and she became Mrs. Anni Lappalainen.

When the Soviet Union launched an offensive in 1944, the Finns retreated, and Anni Lappalainen was on the last train out of Russian Karelia. Lyudmila Markianova was left behind and was raised by her maternal grandparents. Lyudmila was mentioned in her mother's ID documents in Finland, but in reality she remained in the Soviet Union. Mrs. Lappalainen's native Soviet Union considered her a traitor, and getting the child back and into Finland was out of the question. Lyudmila met her mother again only in the 1970s.

Markianova was raised by her maternal grandparents in the Suarikoski village in Olonets Karelia on the banks of the Olonka River. Due to the circumstances of the war, she had no identity documents until the age of 14. Only then, when she had travelled to Petrozavodsk in order to participate in the entry exam to a pedagogical institute, the head of the institute helped her to get her ID papers. In Petrozavodsk, Markianova studied to become a teacher, and upon graduating, she worked for two years as a teacher in Sändämy, after which she was accepted into the Karelian Institute of Pegadogy. There she studied Russian philology, completing her studies in 1965. After this, she worked as the vice rector of the Kuittinen high school.

=== Scientific career ===
After she got married, Markianova moved to Petrozavodsk, where she worked in the library of the Karelian Centre of Science. There she was noticed by G. M. Gert, who had founded a school of Baltic Finnic Languages in the city. Gert suggested to Markianova that she could pursue further studies there. Markianova would rather have studied in Tartu under Paul Ariste, but this was impossible for a woman with a family. She thus returned to her studies in Petrozavodsk, but only in 1975. Her dissertation was on "Verbal suffixes and word formation in Karelian". She defended her thesis in Tartu in 1980.

When the times allowed it, Markianova was one of the first persons to approach the Karelian Oblast Committee of the Communist Party with a letter, asking that the Karelian language be taken in the curriculum of all schools in the Karelian Autonomous Soviet Socialist Republic. At the time, the Karelian language was in a unique situation in the Soviet Union: the language of every other titular nation in the country was being taught in the schools of the corresponding republic or region. At the time, there were articles in local papers about creating a unified written standard for the Karelian language(s), and broadcasts in these languages were begun in the local radio.

Markianova then worked in the Soviet Academy of Sciences, in the Institute of Language, Literature and History in Petrozavodsk, first as a junior researcher from 1979 on, then as a scientific secretary from 1983 on, and finally as a vice director of the institute from 1989 on. During these years, Markianova published a series of scientific articles that dealt with word formation in the Karelian language from various points of view.

In her research, Markianova discovered that the Karelian language was a particularly rich one, from the point of view of word formation. She began to put this in practise when she became the head of the department of Karelian and Veps in the Karelian Pedagogical Institute. She devised an orthography for the Olonets Karelian language, which was made an official one by the leadership of the Karelian Republic in 1989. The orthography for Dvina (Northern) Karelian was developed at the same time by Pekka Zaikov. Markianova's position was that both languages should have one, unified norm for writing, but she fell in the minority.

Markianova has worked hard so that Karelian could be taught in the schools of the Karelian Republic. Together with Z. M. Dubrovina from St. Petersburg, she wrote a primer called Aberi (1990). After this followed a textbook called Kirjuniekku (1992). She had also authored various books on Olonets Karelian phonetics and grammar. The most important of these is Karjalan kielioppi ('Karelian Grammar', 2002).

From the early 1990s on, Markianova has also published various dictionaries. In 1996, she published, together with Tatyana Boiko, her Karjal-venäläine sanakniigu ('Karelian-Russian Dictionary'). She also worked on developing new vocabulary for Karelian, under the auspices of Committee on National Affairs of the Karelian Republic, in the commission on terminology and orthography. Among the fruits of these labours were Lingvistiekkuterminät ('Linguistic Terminology', 2000), Školasanasto ('Vocabulary for Schools', 2000), Fauna- ja florasanasto ('Vocabulary on Fauna and Flora', 2005), Ühteis-kunnallis-poliittine sanasto ('Vocabulary for Social and Political Affairs', 2004–2004). After these books, Markianova was ready to state that now one could discuss anything in Karelian, no matter what the context. The climax of this work was the Bol'šoĭ russko-karel'skiĭ slovar' ('Russian-Karelian General Dictionary', 2011), on which she collaborated with Tatyana Boiko.

Markianova was also involved in the creation of the Olonets Karelian Children's Bible, which was given the title Biblii lapsile (1995). She has also contributed to the periodical Carelia, published in Petrozavodsk.

In Finland, Markianova has collaborated with Raija Pyöli on Sanakirja suomi-karjala ('Finnish-Karelian Dictionary', 2008).

== In Finland, under a threat to be expelled to Russia ==
In 2011, Markianova was diagnosed with Alzheimer's disease. At the time, she was living in Petrozavodsk and cared for by the father of her daughter until 2013 when he died. The daughter brought Markianova to Finland, where she has been living since the mid-1990s. She is a citizen of Finland and is married to a Finn. In 2014 Markianova has been ordered by Finnish Immigration Service to be deported to Russia, although she has no relatives there, and no one to take care of her. The daughter has applied for a residence permit for her mother, but she was turned down by the local administrative court. According to the Finnish Immigration Service "a person would have to be found in unreasonable circumstances in order for a residence permit to be granted to him or her" The daughter has filed an appeal to the Supreme Administrative Court of Finland.

== An appeal for Markianova ==
When the news was published that Markianova might be expelled, a group of Finnish scientists organized an appeal for her. In a short period of time, over 5,000 persons signed the petition. The author Raimo Jussila wrote in the letters-to-the-editor section of Helsingin Sanomat that "before her expulsion, the state of Finland should award a decoration to Lyudmila Markianova, for her merits in promoting Finnish literature among our kindred people." He referred to the Karelian translations of Juhani Aho's works by Markianova.

== Works ==
=== Personal publications ===
- Suffiksal'noe glagol'noe slovoobrazovanie v karel'skom âzyke: obzory i recenzii. Tallinn: AN Èstonskoj SSR, 1981.
- Glagol’noe slovoobrazovanie v karel’skom âzyke. [‘Word formation of verbs in Karelian’] Petrozavodsk, 1985.
- Livvin murdehen foneetiekku. ['Phonetics of the Livvi Dialect.'] Teaching aid. Petrozavodsk, 1992.
- Kirjuniekku. Opastundukniigu 2. kluasan liugiläzii lapsii näh. ['Second Class Reader in Karelian.'] Karjala, Petrozavodsk, 1992. (Valentina ja Sergei Tšinjonov, kuvitus.)
- Livvin murdehen morfolougii. Nominat da abusanat. ['Morphology of the Livvi Dialect. Nominals and Auxiliaries.'] 100 s. Petrozavodsk State University. Petrozavodsk, 1993.
- Livvin murdehen morfolougii. Verbit, adverbit. ['Morphology of the Livvi Dialect. Verbs and Adverbs.'] ] Teaching aid.. Petrozavodsk State University, 1995.
- Lingvistiekkuterminät. ['Linguistic Terminology.'] Tazavallan sanastokomissii, Petrozavodsk, 2000.
- Školasanasto. ['School Vocabulary.'] Tazavallan sanastokomissii, Petrozavodsk, 2000.
- Karjalan kielioppi 5–9. ['Karelian Grammar 5–9.'] Periodika, Petrozavodsk, 2002.
- Yhteiskunnallis-poliittini sanasto: varsinais-karjalan murreh: A-O = Obŝestvenno-političeskaâ leksika: sobstvenno-karel'skoe narečie: A-O. [‘Vocabulary for Social and Political Affairs, A–P.’] Gosudarstvennyĭ komitet Respubliki Kareliâ po delam nacional'noĭ politiki. Respublikanskaâ termino-orfografičeskaâ komissiâ; Karjalan Tasavallan rahvallisen politiikan aseijen valtiokomitietta. Tasavallan sanastokomiisi. Periodika, Petrozavodsk, 2003.
- Ühteiskunnallis-poliittine sanasto: P-Â (Obŝestvenno-političeskaâ leksika: P-Â). [‘Vocabulary for Social and Political Affairs, P–Ia.’] Gosudarstvennyĭ komitet Respubliki Kareliâ po delam nacional'noĭ politiki. Respublikanskaâ termino-orfografičeskaâ komissiâ; Karjalan Tasavallan rahvallisen politiikan aseijen valtiokomitietta. Tasavallan sanastokomiisi. Periodika, Petrozavodsk, 2004.
- Fauna- da florasanasto: Leksika po faune i flore. [‘Lexicon on Fauna and Flora.’] Periodika, Petrozavodsk, 2005.

=== Joint publications ===
- Markianova, L. – Dubrovina, Zinaida: Aberi. Karjalan kielel liugiläzii lapsii näh. [‘Karelian Primer.’] Karjala. Petrozavodsk, 1990.
- Markianova, L. – Il'jina, O. – Kuz'mina N.: Tekstukogomus paginurokkoih näh livvin murdehel. ['Texts for Karelian Lessons.'] Petrozavodsk State University. Petrozavodsk, 1994.
- Ludmila Markianova, Tatjana Boiko: Karel’sko-russkij slovar’, livvikovskoe narečie. Okolo 8000 slov. [‘Karelian-Russian Dictionary. Ca. 8,000 words.’] Noin 8000 sanaa.) Petrozavodsk, 1996.
- Markianova, L. – Il'jina, O. – Bogdanova, L.: Karjalan kielen harjoituskogomus. Nominat livvin murdehel. ['Exercises in Karelian Language. Nominals in the Livvi Dialect.'] Petrozavodsk State University Publishing. Petrozavodsk, 1999.
- Markianova, L. – Il'jina, O. – Bogdanova, L.: Karjalan kielen harjoituskogomus. Verbit, infinitiivat, partisiipat, adverbit livvin murdehel. ['Exercises in Karelian Language. Verbs, infinitives, participles and adverbs in the Livvi Dialect.'] Petrozavodsk State University Publishing. Petrozavodsk, 2000.
- Markianova, L. – Mensonen, Aaro: Opastummo karjalakse. Lugemistu aiguzille. [‘Learning Karelian. Readings for Adults.’] Karjalan kielen seuran julkaisuja 2. Verso, Petrozavodsk, 2006.
- Markianova, L. – Mensonen, Aaro: Opastummo karjalakse. Harjoituskogomus. [‘Learning Karelian. Exercises.’] Ilias, Joensuu, 2007.
- Markianova, L. – Pyöli, Raija: Sanakirja suomi–karjala. ['A Finnish-Karelian Dictionary.'] Salmi-säätiö, Kuopio, 2008.
- Boiko T. P., Markianova L. F.: Bol'šoĭ russko-karel'skiĭ slovar', livvikovskoe narečie. Suuri ven'a-karjalaine sanakniigu: livvin murreh. [‘Russian-Karelian General Dictionary: Livvi Dialect.’] Rossiĭskaia Akademiia nauk, Karel'skiĭ nauchnyĭ centr, Institut âzyka, literatury i istorii. Petrozavodsk, 2011.

=== As a translator ===
- Klementjev, J. I.: Karjalazet. Histouriellis-etnografilline kuva. ['Karelians. An Ethnographic and Historical Description.'] Bibliotheca Fenno-Ugrica. Periodika, Petrozavodsk, 2008.
- Wuorikoski, Jukka-Pekka: Kirjuta kaunehesti karjalakse. Luojan kirjuttamizen alguopastai. [‘Write Beautiful Karelian. A Guide for Creative Writing.’] Helsinki: Karjalan kielen seura, 2008.
- Wuorikoski, Jukka-Pekka (toim.): Nalle Karhu — Meččyrunoloi lapsile. [‘The Bear. Forest Poems for Children.’] Helsinki: Karjalan kielen seura, 2009.
- Juhani Aho: Juha. Helsinki: Karjalan Kielen Seura, 2010.
- Juhani Aho: Lastuloi. Helsinki: Karjalan kielen seura, 2013.
- Juhani Aho: Raudutie. Helsinki: Karjalan kielen seura, 2013.
