= Markku Laukkanen =

Finnish politician (born 1950)

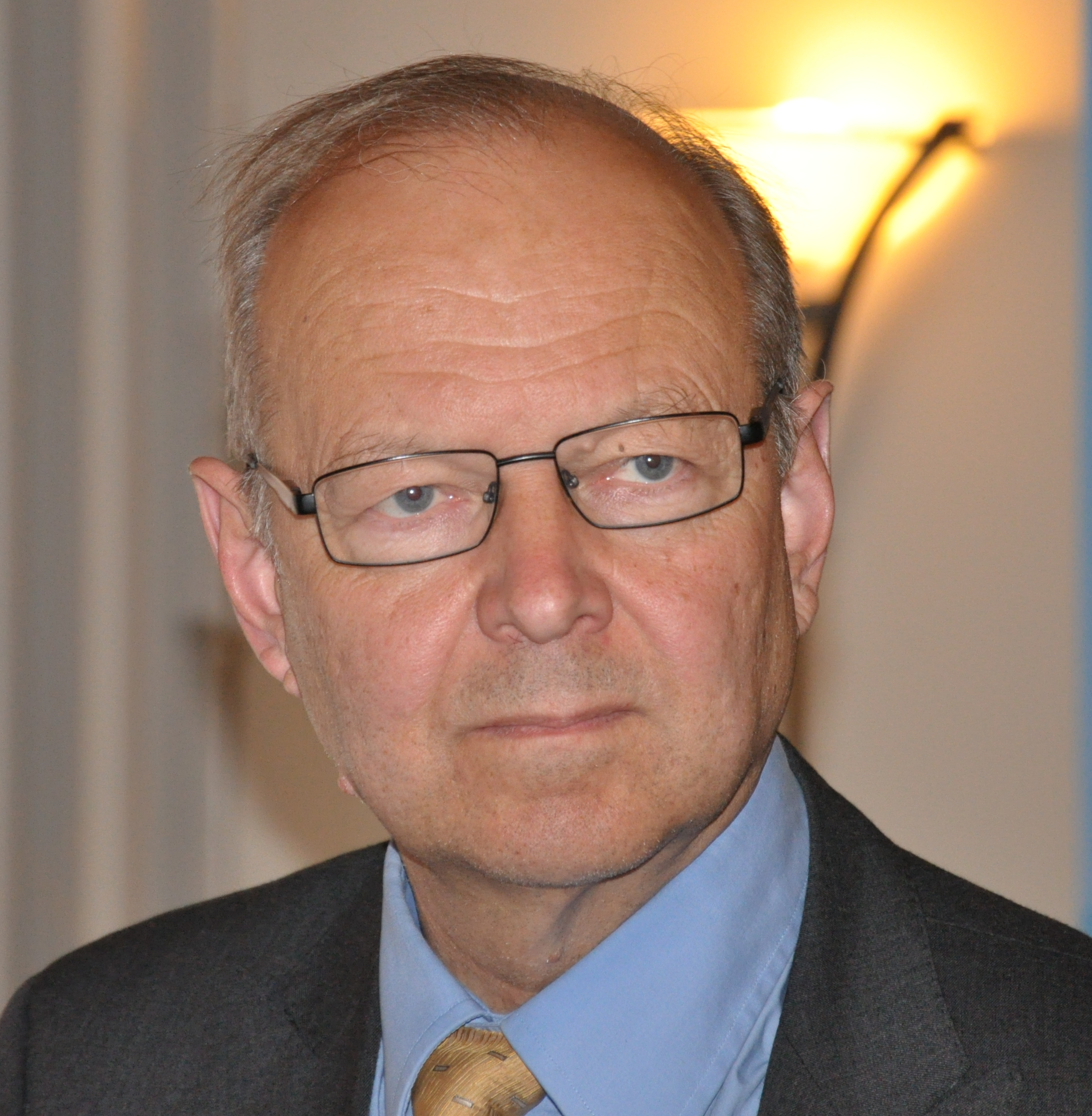
Markku Laukkanen in May 2009

Markku Matti Laukkanen (born 20 December 1950 in Valkeala) is a Finnish TV journalist and politician. He was a member of the Parliament of Finland from 1991 to 1995 and again from 1999 to 2011, representing the Centre Party. He is a graduate of the University of Tampere.
