= Anders Mickelson =

Finnish goldsmith

Anders Mickelson was a Finnish goldsmith and Fabergé workmaster.

Mickelson was born 8 January in 1839 in Pyhtää, Finland.

He worked in St. Petersburg as a apprentice from 1855, as a journeyman from 1859 and from 1867 ran his own workshop as a master. He was an outworker of Fabergé, made mostly gold cigarette cases and small enamelled objects. His initials are AM on the objects. Together with his fellow Fabergé master Vassily Feodorovich Soloviev, he bought in 1912 or earlier, the workshop of master goldsmith Friedrich Theodor Ringe at 12 Malaja Morskaya from his widow Anna Karlovna Ringe.

Anders Mickelson died in St. Petersburg 8 November in 1913.

== Sources ==
- H.C. Bainbridge, Peter Carl Fabergé: Goldsmith and Jeweller to the Russian Imperial Court (1966)
- G.von Habsburg-Lothringen & A.von Solodkoff, Fabergé - Court Jeweler to the Tsars (1979) ISBN 0-914427-09-1
- Ulla Tillander-Godenhielm, Fabergén suomalaiset mestarit (Fabergé´s Finnish masters) (2011) p. 191. ISBN 978-951-31-5878-1
