= Stephen Wäkevä =

Finnish silversmith (1833–1910)

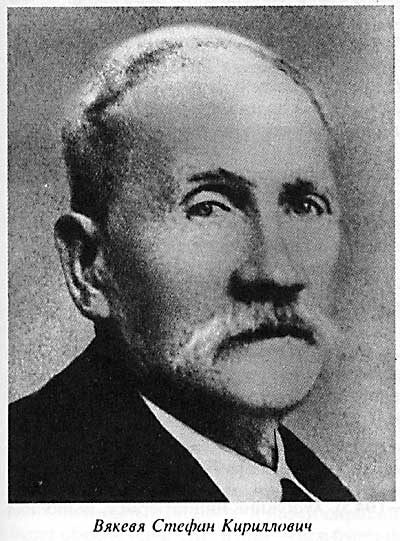
Stephen Wäkevä

Stefan Wäkevä (1833–1910) was a Finnish silversmith and Fabergé workmaster.

== Life ==
He was born on 4 November 1833 in Väkevälä village, Säkkijärvi, in the Viipuri Province of the Grand Duchy of Finland.

He was an apprentice in St. Petersburg at the workshop of silversmith Olof Fredrik Wennerström in 1843. He was a journeyman at the age of 14 in 1847 and then master in 1856.

Wäkevä's workshop at 41 of the fifth of Roždestvenskaya (Sovetskaya) Street supplied Fabergé with silverware, mostly tea-services, tankards and punch bowls.

Stefan Wäkevä's hallmark was the letters S.W in a circle. His two sons (Alexander Wäkevä and Konstantin Wäkevä) also worked for Fabergé, taking over his father's workshop at his death in 1910.
