= Kanneljärvi =

Kanneljärvi may refer to:

- Pobeda, Leningrad Oblast (named Kanneljärvi before 1948)
- Kanneljärvi village, known as Uusikirkko before 1925
