= Anton Suurkonka =

Finnish politician

Anton Suurkonka (12 August 1886, Valkeala - 31 March 1964) was a Finnish farmer, business executive, lay preacher and politician. He was a member of the Parliament of Finland from 1930 to 1936, from 1939 to 1945 and again from 1948 to 1951, representing the Agrarian League.
