= Johan Victor Aarne =

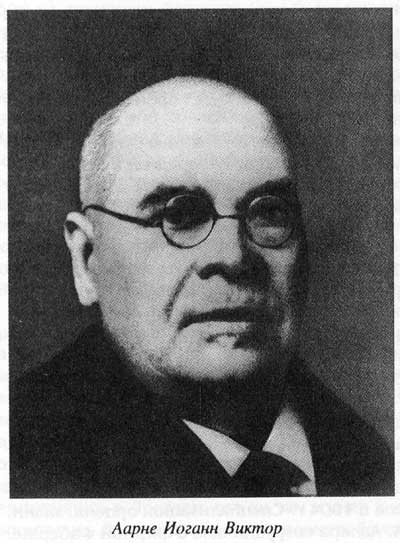
Johan Victor Aarne

Johan Victor Aarne (Finnish Johan Victor Aarne, native Lindstrom Swedish Lindström; May 6, 1863 – June 30, 1934) - one of the famous Finnish jewelers of the 19th – 20th centuries; collaborated with Fabergé, being a supplier of the Russian imperial court.

== Biography ==
He was born in Tammerfors, Grand Duchy of Finland, into the family of church dyak Johan Lindström. He studied jewelry with a famous jeweler from Tammerfors - Johan Erik Hellsten.

In 1880 he became an apprentice in a workshop in Tavastehus. For the next ten years, between 1880 and 1890, he most likely worked for Fabergé in August Holmström's and in Mihael Perkhin's workshops. In 1890 he returned to Tampere to obtain his title of Master; he then ran his own workshop there for a year.

In 1890 he returned to Tammerfors to receive the title of master, and during the year maintained his own workshop. In 1891 and by 1904 he moved to Saint Petersburg, where he worked directly for Fabergé. His workshop was located at 58 Demidovskaya Street at the intersection with the Catherine Canal. Twenty apprentices and three students worked in the workshop. His personal Cyrillic brand "ВА" is present on many Fabergé enameled gold and silver jewelry of that time. His specialization were the photo frames and button bells.

In 1904, Aarne sold his workshop to Karl Armfeldt and moved to Vyborg, where he had a successful jewelry business for another thirty years, having in that period of time a personal brand "J.V.A".

Johan Aarne died on June 30, 1934, in Vyborg, Finland.
