= Kymi (parliamentary electoral district) =

Former electoral district of the Parliament of Finland

Kymi was an electoral district represented in the Finnish Eduskunta (parliament). It covered the administrative regions of South Karelia and Kymenlaakso in south-eastern Finland, with a combined population of about 322,000 (as of 2002). Kymi elected 12 members of the Eduskunta. In 2013, the district was merged with Southern Savonia to form the new Southeast Finland district.

The constituency was largely urban and traditionally working-class. The largest party in the 2003 election was the Social Democratic Party of Finland.

== Former members of parliament 2007–2013 ==
- Sinikka Hurskainen (SDP)
- Jyri Häkämies (Kok.)
- Anneli Kiljunen (SDP)
- Valto Koski (SDP)
- Jari Larikka (Kok.)
- Markku Laukkanen (Kesk.)
- Reijo Paajanen (Kok.)
- Sirpa Paatero (SDP)
- Markku Pakkanen (Kesk.)
- Sari Palm (KD)
- Kimmo Tiilikainen (Kesk.)
- Pentti Tiusanen (Vas)
- KD = Christian Democrats
- Kesk. = Centre
- Kok. = National Coalition
- SDP = Social Democrats
- Vas. = Left Alliance
- Vihr. = Greens

== Old election results ==
Finnish parliamentary election, 2003
| Party | Seats | Net gain/loss | Seats % | Votes % | Votes | +/− |
|---|---|---|---|---|---|---|
| SDP | 5 | 0 | 41.7 | 34.8 | 59,567 | +1.6% |
| Centre | 3 | 0 | 25.0 | 25.8 | 44,127 | +3.2% |
| National Coalition | 3 | 0 | 25.0 | 20.4 | 34,912 | -4.4% |
| Left Alliance | 1 | 0 | 8.3 | 7.0 | 11,954 | +0.7% |
| KD | 0 | 0 | 0.0 | 5.5 | 9,438 | +0.1% |
| Green | 0 | 0 | 0.0 | 4.5 | 7,767 | -0.9% |
| other groups | 0 | 0 | 0.0 | 2.1 | 3,568 | n/a |

== See also ==
- Electoral districts of Finland
