= Paavo Karjalainen =

Finnish journalist and politician (1904–1978)

Paavo Armas Karjalainen (5 December 1904 – 1 November 1978) was a Finnish journalist and politician. He was a member of the Parliament of Finland from 1945 to 1951, representing the Social Democratic Party of Finland (SDP). Karjalainen was born in Valkeala.
