= Julius Rappoport =

Julius Alexander Rappoport, originally Isak Abramovich, was a Lithuanian silversmith and Fabergé workmaster.

Rappoport was born in Kovno, Russian Empire in 1851.

Julius Rappoport opened his first own workshop in St. Petersburg at Ekateriniski Canal in 1883, then he moved to Moscow to become a Fabergé workmaster. Trained in Berlin, he was one of Fabergé’s rare craftsmen of Jewish origin. His maker's mark was IP and in Russian Cyrillic (иp). He belonged from 1886 till 1908 to four "workmasters", main leaders of Fabergé workshops. He was the Fabergé’s most important supplier of large silver objects. He is best known for his naturalistic animal figures (massive silver casts), but he also executed special commissions for the Imperial Family, the Imperial Cabinet and noble families Yusupov an others.

Recently a few of these special commissions that were designed by Fabergé, and made by Rappoport, have been auctioned by Bonhams and Christies in London(England) and in Munich. Samples of his work include a massive silver dishes and table decorations, such as:tankard with two handles in a form of elephants for the Danish royal family- 2) tankard made in St. Petersburg, circa 1908 which he retailed in Moscow. 3) silver enamel decorated Eggs made in St. Petersburg circa 1883.

This tankard, with gently waisted sides, is set with twelve silver roubles, each depicting a monarch in profile, including Peter the Great, Catherine I, Anna, Elizabeth, Peter III of Russia, Catherine II, Paul I of Russia, Alexander I, Nicholas I of Russia, Alexander II of Russia, Alexander III of Russia. What makes his work unique is that the rouble coins are visible on both sides - inside the shell and on the outside.

Within the boldly chased shell, the surrounds are rococo scrolls which simulate sea spray. The rounded top cover was set with a further rouble coin of Nicholas II of Russia. It has a scroll handle and acanthus thumbpiece.

In total, the height (including the thumbpiece) is 29 cm (11 in).

His master mark was on the articles: I.P. in Russian Cyrillic (иp). His workshop was taken over by the First Silver Artel around 1909. Died in Petrograd in 1917.
