= The First Silver Artel =

The First Silver Artel was a group of silver and gold workmen in Russia active at the beginning of the 20th century. Before retiring, Julius Rappoport wished to reward his workmen for their long and faithful service and left his workshop and all its equipment to them. The first Silversmith's Artel was thus formed, and the House of Fabergé decided to promote the cooperative experiment by granting the group credit and commissions. The Artel worked from 1909 and used productions molds, including the animal figures, from Rappoport's stock, marking its products with ICA and the Imperial Warrant mark. After two or three years of internal discord, increases in the cost of production, and declines in quality, the Artel ceased to exist, circa 1912–13.
