= Boris Akbulatov =

Russian artist and illustrator (born 1949)

Boris Ravilyevich Akbulatov (Russian: Борис Равильевич Акбулатов, born December 5, 1949, Ladva village, Karelo-Finnish SSR) is a Russian artist and illustrator.

Since 1985 he was engaged in creating illustrations to epic Kalevala

He was awarded several times for his book illustrations. In 2003 he was awarded an honorary title of Laureate of the Republic of Karelia.
