= Erkki Paavolainen =

Finnish journalist, educationist and politician

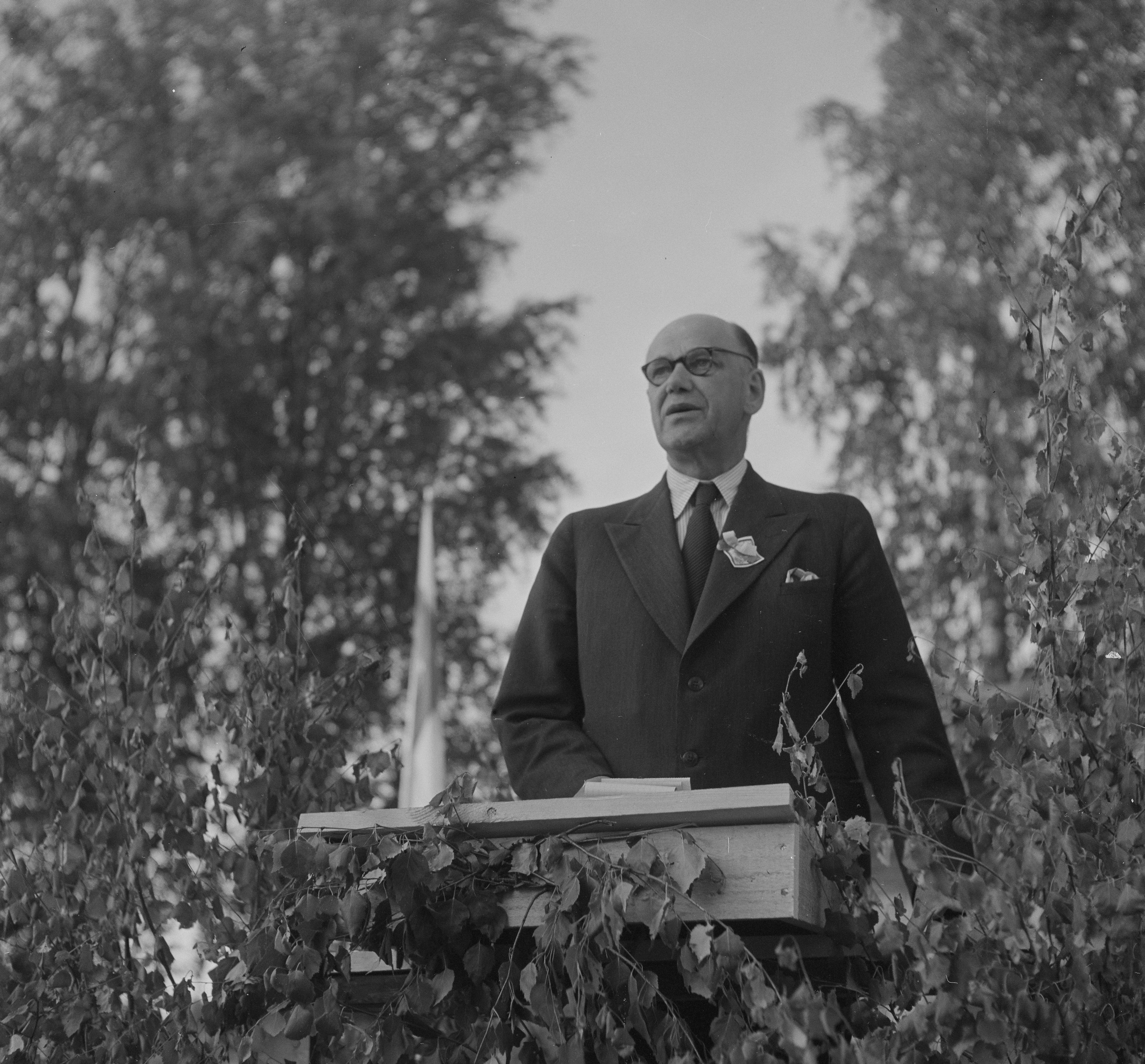
- Erkki Paavolainen in 1943

Minister of Social Affairs
- In office 3 March 1932 – 20 October 1932

Personal details
- Born: 17 May 1890 Kivennapa, Finland
- Died: 18 March 1960 (aged 69) Helsinki, Finland
- Party: National Coalition Party
- Relations: Pekka Paavolainen (brother); Jaakko Paavolainen (son)
- Occupation: Journalist; educationist; politician

Erkki Paavolainen (17 May 1890 in Kivennapa – 18 March 1960 in Helsinki) was a Finnish journalist, educationist and politician. He was Minister of Social Affairs from 3 March to 20 October 1932. Paavolainen served as a Member of the Parliament of Finland from 1924 to 1927, from 1929 to 1933, from 1936 to 1947 and again from 1948 to 1951, representing the National Coalition Party. He was the younger brother of Pekka Paavolainen and the father of Jaakko Paavolainen.
