= Erik August Kollin =

Finnish jeweler (1836–1901)

Erik August Kollin (28 December 1836 – 1901) was a Finnish jeweler who worked for Fabergé in St. Petersburg.

== Early life ==
Kollin was born in Pohja in southwest Finland. He studied as a journeyman with gold and silversmith Alexander Palmén in Ekenäs in 1858, before travelling to St. Petersburg.

== Career ==
He qualified as workmaster in 1868 at August Holmström's workshop, and in 1870 opened his own workshop in St. Petersburg. Kollin worked for August Holmström and for Carl Fabergé, and was soon put in charge of all Fabergé workshops, a post he held until 1886 when he was replaced by Michael Perkhin.

He was Fabergé's first chief jeweler. Specialized in gold and silver articles, most of them in an archaic style of the period. The artefacts produced by Kollin for Fabergé before his departure in 1886 generally bears his initials EK, together with Fabergé's hallmark and are frequently to be found in a Fabergé box. Evidently these pre-date the change of hallmarks in 1899. Objects bearing EK mark only and produced between 1885 and 1899 should be considered as the work of an independent operator, unless cased by Fabergé.
