= Pekka Paavolainen =

Finnish politician

Pekka Paavolainen (30 December 1868 – 12 January 1930) was a Finnish lawyer, civil servant and politician. He served as a member of the Parliament of Finland from 1913 to 1919, representing the Young Finnish Party until 1918 and the National Coalition Party thereafter. He was born in Kivennapa, and was the elder brother of Erkki Paavolainen and the father of Olavi Paavolainen.
