= Jussi Pylkkänen =

- Born: May 1963 (age 63)
- Education: Oxford University
- Occupation: Art Advisor

Jussi Pylkkänen (born May 1963) is a Finnish art advisor who was previously the global president of the auction house Christie's.

Pylkkänen was educated at King's College School in Wimbledon, and has a bachelor's degree in English from Lady Margaret Hall at Oxford University, and a master's degree in Fine and Decorative Art.

Pylkkänen was a Trustee of the Dulwich Picture Gallery from 2017 to 2019.

Pylkkänen joined the auction house Christie’s in 1986 as a specialist in the Print Department and became the Head of the Impressionist and Modern Art Department in 1995. In 2005 Pylkkänen was appointed President of Christie's Europe and in 2014 he was appointed Christie's global president.

As an auctioneer, Pylkkänen has handled some of the most valuable works of art ever sold at auction, including six which sold above $100 million. His auction records include the most expensive painting ever sold (Leonardo da Vinci's Salvator Mundi), the most expensive painting by a twentieth century artist (Andy Warhol's Shot Sage Blue Marilyn) and the most expensive work of art by a living artist (Jeff Koons' Rabbit).

Pylkkänen left Christie's at the end of 2023 to set up Art Pylkkänen, a bespoke art advisory partnership based in London.
