= Anders Nevalainen =

Fabergé workmaster

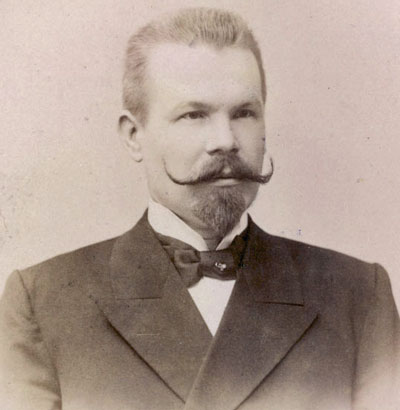
Anders Nevalainen

Anders (Antti) Juhaninpoika Nevalainen (1 January 1858 – 1933) was a Finnish gold- and silversmith, and a Fabergé workmaster.

== Biography ==
Anders Nevalainen was born in Kylänlahti village in Pielisjärvi, Finland. He was an apprentice in Finland and in St. Petersburg in 1874, a goldworker in 1875 (and registered as an employee of Fabergé), and a master goldsmith in 1885, opened his workshop at 35 Kazanskaya Street.

As master first working in the jewelry atelier of August Holmström, he soon became head of workshop under exclusive contract with Fabergé. His workshop made silver-mounted frames in birchwood, palisander or lacquer, silver- and gold cigarette-cases, enameled silver-gilt cases with leather sleeves, several small silver-gilt objects. His initials A.N, mostly used with K.Fabergé mark without the double-headed eagle Imperial Warrant.

Anders Nevalainen later opened his own shop while maintaining his contract with Fabergé. He specialized in embroidered cigarette cases, silver frames, ceramics and woodwork.

The Nevalainen family returned to Finland after the Russian Revolution in 1917. Anders Nevalainen died in Terijoki in 1933.

== Signature ==
In his book Fabergé’s Eggs: The Extra-ordinary Story of the Masterpieces that Outlived an Empire (2008), Dr Ulla Tillander-Godenhielm argues that workmasters were not using their exact names in their works, and that Anders Nevalainen's actual name is Antti Nevalainen (Anders being the Swedish version of his name).

== Family ==
In 1884, Anders Nevalainen married Maria Karolina Liljerot (1860–1936). One of their five children, Arvid Nevalainen (1897–1963), was a clockmaster .

== Work ==
- Frame with a miniature of Queen Alexandra

== Bibliography ==
- H.C. Bainbridge, Peter Carl Fabergé: Goldsmith and Jeweller to the Russian Imperial Court (1966)
- G.von Habsburg-Lothringen & A.von Solodkoff, Fabergé - Court Jeweler to the Tsars (1979) ISBN 0-914427-09-1
- Geoffrey Watts, Russian Silversmiths' Hallmarks (1700 to 1917) (2006)
- М.М. Постникова-Лосева, Н.Г.П. Платонова, Б.Л. Ульяноа, ЗОЛОТОЕ И СЕРЕБРЯНОЕ ДЕЛО XV-XX вв. (2003)
- Gerard Hill, G.G. Smorodinova and B.L. Ulyanova, Fabergé and the Russian master Goldsmiths (2008)
- Ulla Tillander-Godenhielm, Personal and Historical Notes on Fabergé's Finnish workmasters and designers (page 42.) (1980)
