= Pyhäjärvi (Karelia) =

Lake on the border of Finland and Russia

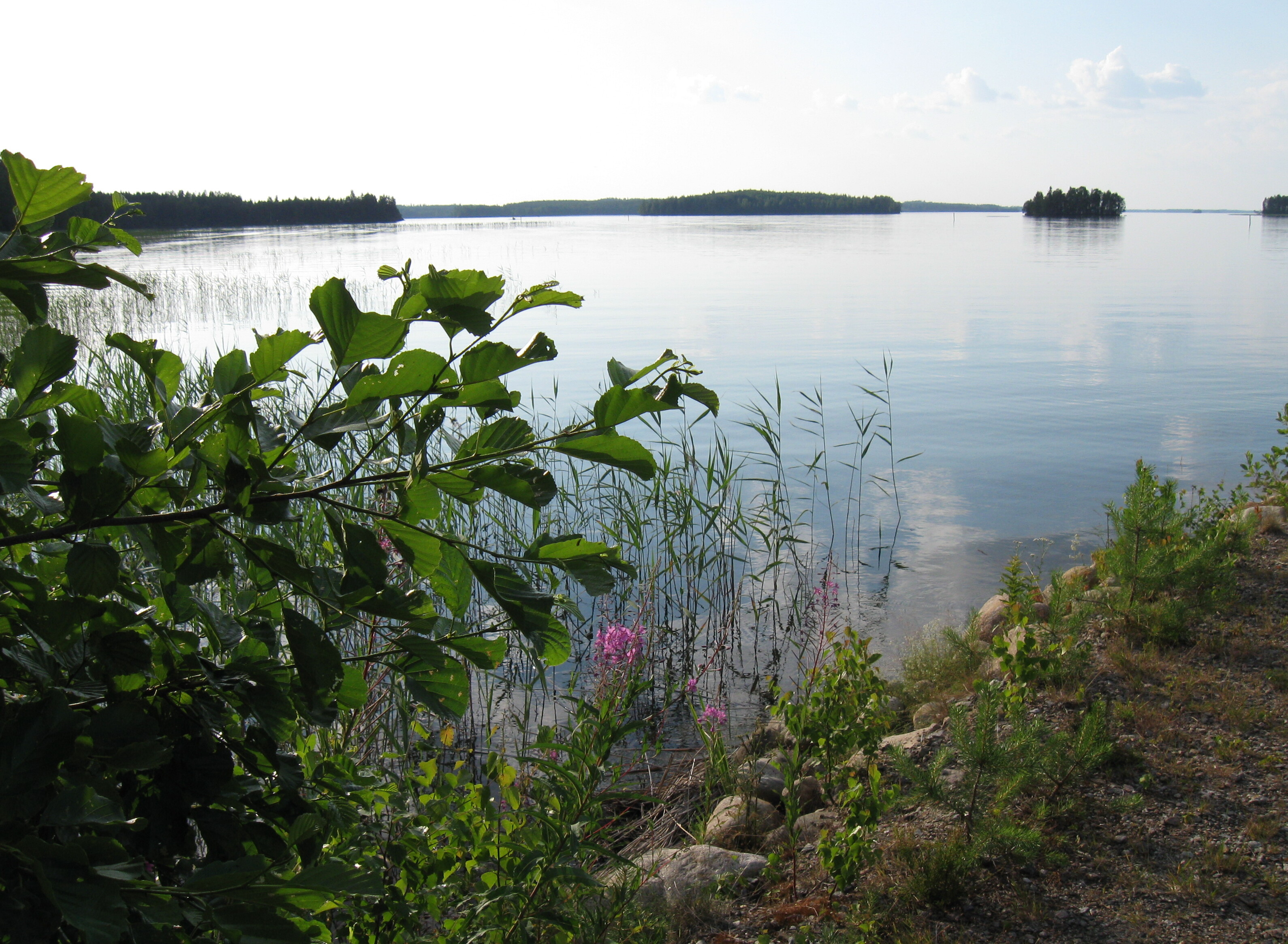

- Location within Finland
- Location: Karelia
- Coordinates: 61°53′N 30°03′E
- Basin countries: Finland, Russia
- Surface area: 206.79 km^{2} (79.84 sq mi)
- Max. depth: 46 m (151 ft)
- Surface elevation: 79.6 m (261 ft)
- Settlements: Kesälahti, Uukuniemi

Pyhäjärvi (Russian: Пюхяярви) is a lake located mostly in Finland. The southeastern part of the lake is located in Russia.

== See also ==
- Niukkala
