= Consonant gradation =

Phonetic phenomenon in Uralic languages

Consonant gradation is a type of consonant mutation (mostly lenition but also assimilation) found in some Uralic languages, more specifically in the Finnic, Samic and Samoyedic branches. It originally arose as an allophonic alternation between open and closed syllables, but has become grammaticalised due to changes in the syllable structure of the languages affected.

== Definition ==
The term "consonant gradation" refers to a word-medial alternation of consonants between fortis and lenis realisations. The fortis strong grade appears in historically open syllables (ending in a vowel), while the lenis weak grade appears in historically closed syllables (ending in a consonant). The exact realisation of the fortis–lenis distinction differs between the branches. In the Samic languages it was realised through fortition, specifically lengthening, in the strong grade. In the Finnic and Samoyedic languages, there was instead lenition in the weak grade. Thus, the exact realization of the contrast is not crucial.

Examples of consonant gradation
Language	Alternation (strong : weak)	Phonetic nature of alternation (strong : weak)
Estonian	sukk : suk-a /sukːː/ : /sukːɑ/	Length overlong : long
Finnish	sukka : suka-n /sukːɑ/ : /sukɑn/	Length long : short
Estonian	ait : aid-a /ɑit/ : /ɑid̥ɑ/	Tenseness tense voiceless : lax voiceless
Finnish	aita : aida-n /ɑitɑ/ : /ɑidɑn/	Voicing voiceless : voiced
Finnish	lampi : lamme-n /lɑmpi/ : /lamːen/	Manner of articulation stop : nasal
Karelian	mušta : mušša-n /muʃtɑ/ : /muʃːɑn/	Manner of articulation stop : fricative
Finnish	kylki : kylje-n /kylki/ : /kyljen/	Manner of articulation stop : semivowel
Nganasan	бахи : баби /bahi/ : /babi/	Voicing + manner and place of articulation voiceless glottal fricative : voiced bilabial stop
Finnish	teko : teon /teko/ : /te.on/	Presence of segment stop : zero
Northern Sami	Sápmi : Sámi /saːp.miː/ : /saː.miː/	Presence of segment pre-stopped nasal : plain nasal
Northern Sami	diehtaga : dieđa /tie̯h.ta.ka/ : /tie̯.ða/	Presence of segment + articulation preaspirated stop : fricative
Northern Sami	deadja : deaja /tea̯c.ca/ : /tea̯.ja/	Manner of articulation stop : semivowel
Northern Sami	ruoktu : ruovttu /ruo̯kː.tuː/ : /ruo̯vt.tuː/	Length + articulation long stop + singleton : short semivowel + geminate
Northern Sami	baste : bastte /pasː.te/ : /pas.te/	Length long : short
Nganasan	коӈху : комбу /koŋhu/ : /kombu/	Voicing + manner and place of articulation velar nasal + voiceless glottal fricative : bilabial nasal + voiced bilabial stop

The language groups differ in regard to their treatment sequences of a vowel followed by j or w in Proto-Uralic. In the Samic languages, the second part of these remains phonologically a consonant, and can thus close the syllable before it, triggering the weak grade. It also takes part in gradation itself, lengthening in the strong grade. In Finnic, on the other hand, these were treated as diphthongs, and were equivalent to long vowels in terms of syllable structure. Consequently, they did not close the syllable and did not affect gradation.

Consonant gradation is understood to have originally been a predictable phonological process. In all languages that retain it, however, it has evolved further to a less predictable system of consonant mutation, of morphophonological or even purely morphological nature. This is a consequence of later changes in the structure of syllables, which made closed syllables open or vice versa, without adjusting the gradation. For example, in Northern Sami, the only difference between giella and giela ('language', nominative and genitive singular respectively) is the grade; the final consonant that originally closed the syllable in the genitive form, namely -n, has disappeared (the same happened in the history of Estonian and Nganasan). Even in Finnish, which is relatively conservative with respect to consonants, there are many cases of strong grades in closed syllables and weak grades in open syllables, e.g. sade and sateen ('rain', nominative and genitive singular). These, again, are the result of changes in syllable structure, with the original Proto-Finnic *sadek and *sategen following the rules more obviously. In addition, not all Finnish words that hypothetically could have gradation undergo it: for instance, the genitive form of auto 'car' is auton. Thus, the occurrence of gradation is not morphologically predictable anymore, it is a property of each individual word.

== Historical connections ==
There is no consensus view on the ultimate origin of consonant gradation in the Uralic languages. Three broad positions may be distinguished:

- Gradation in Finnic, Samic and Samoyedic are all connected to one another.
- Gradation in Finnic and Samic are connected; gradation in Samoyedic is an unrelated phenomenon.
- There is no connection between gradation in any of the three language groups, and the similarities are accidental.

In all three groups, consonant gradation has the same conditioning, the distinction between open and closed syllables. In this light, and in the absence of any evidence of the same system having existed in any unrelated language in the world, Helimski (1995) has argued that the latter two options should be rejected as implausible.

If a connection exists, it is also disputed what its nature may be, again allowing for three broad positions:

- Gradation is common inheritance (from either Proto-Uralic or Proto-Finno-Samic).
- Gradation is an areal phenomenon that has developed through language contact.
- Gradation has developed independently in Finnic, Samic, and Samoyedic, based on a set of common preconditions inherited from Proto-Uralic.

The great geographical distance between the Finnic and Samic peoples on one hand, and the Nganasans on the other, leads Helimski to reject the second option of these.

== Finnic languages ==
The original effect of gradation in the Finnic languages can be reconstructed as a lenition of the consonant at the beginning of a closed syllable. Lenition resulted in geminate (long) stops and affricates being shortened, and in short voiceless obstruents /*p *t *k/ becoming voiced, while short voiced obstruents /*b *d *g/ became fricatives:

- *pp [pː] → *p̆p [pˑ]
- *tt [tː] → *t̆t [tˑ]
- *cc [t͡sː] → *c̆c [t͡sˑ]
- *kk [kː] → *k̆k [kˑ]
- *p → *b
- *t → *d
- *k → *g
- *b → *β
- *d → *ð
- *g → *ɣ

Only stops and affricates were affected, not other consonants. Moreover, only the last member of a consonant cluster was subject to gradation, and single stops and affricates were only affected if they were not adjacent to another obstruent. Thus, two-obstruent combinations like kt, st and tk did not undergo lenition, nor did obstruent-sonorant combinations like kl and tr. The voiced stops *b *d *g generally lenited to fricatives /β ð ɣ/ unless they were preceded by a nasal. This change may have occurred already in Proto-Finnic, but is not found in Livonian and Veps. The fricatives later underwent further changes, and the dental and velar fricatives have been lost altogether in most Finnic varieties.

The weakened grades of geminate consonants did not merge with the strong grades of the singleton consonants in Proto-Finnic, and still counted as geminates for the purposes of syllabification. There remained for a period an intermediate quantity, half-long *-t̆t-, which still closed the preceding syllable. Consequently, a syllable ending with a geminate in the weak grade still triggered a weak grade on the preceding syllable as well. In Finnish, the half-long consonants eventually merged with the strong-grade singleton consonants, but in most other Finnic languages, the strong-grade singletons underwent a secondary lenition which prevented this merger.

Gradation later expanded to include a pattern *s ~ *h, presumed to reflect a former pattern *s ~ *z. This type of gradation only systematically appears in cases of word-final *s, which between vowels uniformly becomes *h: Finnish pensas 'bush' has the genitive pensaan < *pensahen. An example is also found after a stressed syllable, however, in the exceptional monosyllabic root *mees : *meehe- "man"; and in a fossilized form, in the postpositions lähellä "near" vs. läsnä "present", reflecting the adessive and the essive of a root *läse- "vicinity". In cases of root-internal *s, this pattern is not normally found (e.g. Finnish pesä 'nest' : plural pesät), though Votic later reintroduced a gradation pattern /s/ : /z/ here (pezäd).

Veps and Livonian have largely leveled the original gradation system, and reflect both weak and strong grades of single stops as /b d ɡ/; this may be an archaism or a substitution of voiced stops for fricatives due to foreign influence (Russian for Veps, Latvian for Livonian). Except for northernmost Veps dialects, both grades of geminate stops are also reflected as /p t k/.

=== Finnish ===
Finnish consonant gradation generally preserves the Proto-Finnic pattern fairly well. The conditioning of syllable structure is still visible in most cases, but it is no longer productive: gradation has become a grammatical feature.

==== Historical sound changes affecting realization of weak grades ====
- The weak grades *p̆p, *t̆t, *k̆k of geminates coincided with plain *p, *t, *k.
- The weak grades *mb, *nd, *ŋg of nasal+stop clusters were assimilated to geminate nasals /mm/, /nn/, /ŋŋ/ (ng).
- The weak grades *lð, *rð of liquid+/t/ clusters were similarly assimilated to geminate liquids /ll/, /rr/.
- *β merged with *ʋ (v). This may have been lost later. For example, the 3rd person singular suffix *-pi is represented by a chroneme, i.e. a lengthening of the preceding vowel; e.g. *tule-βi 's/he comes' → Old Finnish tuleu → Modern Finnish tulee.
- Between two unstressed short vowels (i.e. in the weak grade of suffixal gradation), *ð and *h were lost (but not after a diphthong, cf. illative plurals in -oihin, verbs in -oida); these may be preserved in a variety of dialects.
- After a stressed vowel, *ð remained up until the dissolution of the Finnish dialects. It was lost entirely in Eastern Finnish, while Western Finnish dialects have varying reflexes: /ɾ/ or /r/ in multiple western dialects, /l/ in the old Tavastian dialects, /ð/ in archaic Southwestern and Northwestern dialects. As the area of /ð/ shrunk throughout the 17th—19th centuries, standard Finnish /d/ developed as a spelling pronunciation of orthographical d, modeled after other languages such as Swedish, German and Russian.
- *ɣ also remained until the dissolution of the Finnish dialects. It was generally lost, but in the western dialects it may have become /j/ (most widely between a liquid and /e/, as in kylki, järki below) or /ʋ/ (between two close labial vowels, as in puku below).
- The geminate affricate *cc : *c̆c (found in e.g. *meccä 'forest') was fronted to a dental fricative *θθ : *θ. This sound has been lost in most dialects. Widely in Eastern dialects, both grades became /ht/, leading to loss of gradation. Standard Finnish was left with an unalternating /ts/ (metsä : metsän), a spelling pronunciation similar to the case of /d/. Other patterns found include unalternating /tt/; alternating /tt/ : /t/ (coinciding with original *tt); alternating /ht/ : /h/ (in Eastern dialects, coinciding with original *ht); alternating /ht/ : /t/; and alternating /ss/ ~ /s/.

These changes have made qualitative gradation become more complex, especially in the case of k. In standard Finnish, k is the phoneme with the most possible changes. It can disappear as in jalka 'foot' → jalan 'foot-Gen', or:

Environment	Change	Strong	Weak
-uku- -yky-	k→v	puku kyky	puvun kyvyn
-lki- -rki-	k→j	kylki järki	kyljen järjen
-nk- /ŋk/	/k/→/ŋ/	sänky /sæŋky/	sängyn /sæŋŋyn/

/j/ has been lost in this position in Southeastern Tavastian, Northern Bothnian and Eastern dialects, resulting in kurki (crane) : kuren (crane's) instead of the standard form kurjen.

Short t also has developed more complex gradation due to various assimilations. Patterns include t : d (tietää : tiedän), rt : rr (kertoa : kerron), lt : ll (pelto : pellon), and nt ~ nn (antaa ~ annan).

Alternation patterns for p include p : v (tapa : tavan) and mp : mm (lampi : lammen).

==== Analogical extension of gradation ====
The consonant clusters /ht/ and /hk/ were, comprising two obstruents, not originally subject to gradation (as is still the case for similar clusters such as /sp/, /st/, /tk/). However, gradation pairs ht : *hð and hk : *hɣ were at one point introduced. The first of these patterns remains common in modern Finnish, e.g. vahti : vahdit 'guard(s)'. The second is only found in a limited number of words, e.g. pohje : pohkeet 'calf : calves', but rahka : rahkat 'quark(s)'. Usage varies for some words with /hk/, e.g. for the plural of nahka 'leather, hide', both nahat and nahkat are acceptable.

Quantitative consonant gradation has expanded to include in addition to the pairs kk : k, pp : p, tt : t, also gg : g and bb : b (but not dd : d) in a number of recent loanwords, such as blogata : bloggaan 'to blog'; lobata : lobbaan 'to lobby'.

==== Historical sound changes affecting conditions of gradation ====
One important change was the loss of word-final *-k and *-h early on in the history of Finnish. This resulted in many open syllables with weak grades. In particular, the majority of nouns ending in -e are affected by this, with a weak grade in the nominative form. The imperative form of verbs also ended in a now-lost -k. For examples, side 'bandage', from *siðe, earlier *siðek (cf. Veps sideg, Eastern Votic sidõg); hakea 'to get' → hae! 'get! (imp.)' from *haɣe, earlier *haɣek. Traces of the original syllable closure can be seen in sandhi effects: these classes of words can still be analyzed to contain the assimilative word-final 'consonant' ˣ, realized as lengthening of the next word's initial consonant. Therefore, hae side varastosta 'get a bandage from storage!' is pronounced [hɑe‿sːide‿ʋːɑrɑstostɑ], where the weak grades indeed occur in closed syllables.

The loss of -k combined with loss of d gave rise to the modern Finnish infinitive ending, which was historically *-tak/täk. The final *-k triggered gradation, so that the ending normally became *-dak/däk. In turn, following the loss of d between unstressed vowels, and the loss of final *-k only *-aˣ/äˣ remained. Thus, hakea (originally *hakedak) has only -a as the d was lost. But in verbs like juo-da 'to drink' the /d/ remained since it followed a stressed syllable. In the case of verbs like tulla 'to come', the earlier form was *tul-ðak, but the *ð was assimilated to the /l/ according to the patterns described above. The original strong grade was preserved in verbs like hais-ta 'to stink' since gradation did not take place when a consonant followed /s/.

The situation appears differently in the many verbs ending in -ata/ätä. These verbs seem to have preserved the strong grade in the infinitive ending, going counter to the rules of gradation. However, historically it is in fact a weak grade: the stem of the verb itself ended in *-at/ät-, and this is still visible in the 3rd person imperative ending -atkoon/ätköön. Thus, when combined with the infinitive ending, the verb ended in *-attak/ättäk (similar to the origin of the -ton/tön suffix described above). The -k then weakened the consonant from a geminate *-tt- to a single *-t-, and later loss of -k resulted in the final form -ata/ätä. However, even though this is now a single consonant, it was originally a geminate and therefore triggers the weak grade on the syllable before it. So whereas the infinitive may be for example hypätä 'to jump', its original stem was *hyppät-, as can be seen in the first-person singular form hyppään 'I jump', from earlier *hyppäðen with loss of *-ð-.

An opposite effect was caused by the loss of *h and *ð between unstressed vowels. Loss of h affected nouns and adjectives ending in *-s or *-h, such as kuningas 'king'. In the nominative, this -s appeared as usual, and as the preceding syllable was closed, the weak grade ng appeared. But when a case ending such as the genitive -(e)n was added, the result was originally *kuninkasen, which was then weakened to *kuninkahen, and the loss of -h- then resulted in the modern form kuninkaan. The intermediate steps are seen in mies 'man'. Here, following a stressed syllable, the -h- was not lost, so that its genitive is miehen.

Similar changes affected the illative ending, which was -hVn where V was the same as the vowel preceding the ending. The h is preserved after stressed syllables, as in maahan 'into the land' (from maa), but lost otherwise as in kotiin 'into the home' (from earlier *kotihin, from koti). This explains why kotiin retains a strong grade even though a closed syllable follows it. The Pohjanmaa dialect of Finnish retains the -h-, however.

Words that now end in -e are in fact very similar to those ending in -s. These originally ended with -k or -h so that the nominative ended in a consonant just as kuningas and therefore the preceding syllable was in the weak grade. But after an ending was added, the weak grade g appeared, which eventually disappeared just as h did.

==== Analogical limitation of gradation ====
While syllabic gradation remains generally productive, the distortions of its original phonetic conditions have left it essentially a morphologically conditioned process. This is particularly visible in forms that display a strong grade where a weak would be historically expected, or vice versa. Possessive suffixes, in particular, are always preceded by the strong grade, even if the suffix may cause the syllable to be closed. For example, 'our bed' is sänkymme, not ˣsängymme.

Strong grades may also be found in closed syllables in contractions such as jotta en → jotten.

Several recent loans and coinages with simple /p, t, k/ are also left entirely outside of gradation, e.g. auto (: auton) 'car', eka (: ekan) 'first', muki (: mukin) 'mug', peti (: petin, sometimes pedin ) 'bed', söpö (: söpön) 'cute'. A number of proper names such as Alepa, Arto, Malta, Marko belong in this class as well.

Suffixal gradation has been largely lost, usually in favor of the weak grade. While the partitive plurals of kana 'hen' and lakana 'bedsheet' still show distinct treatment of the original *-ta (kanoja, lakanoita), the partitive singulars in modern Finnish both have the weak grade (kanaa, lakanaa), although in several dialects of older Finnish the form lakanata occurred for the latter. Similarly the participle ending *-pa is now uniformly -va, even after stressed syllables; e.g. syö-vä 'eating', voi-va 'being able'. (The original forms may remain in diverged sense or fossilized derivatives: syöpä 'cancer', kaikki-voipa 'almighty'.)

=== Karelian ===
Karelian consonant gradation is quite similar to Finnish: *β *ð *ɣ have been lost in a fashion essentially identical to Eastern Finnish (and may have occurred in the common ancestor of the two), with the exception that assimilation rather than loss has occurred also for *lɣ and *rɣ. E.g. the plural of jalka 'foot' is jallat, contrasting with jalat in Finnish and jalad in Estonian.

Karelian still includes some gradation pairs which Finnish does not. The consonants /t k/ undergo consonant gradation when following a coronal obstruent /s š t/: muistua 'to remember' → muissan 'I remember', matka → matan 'trip' (nom. → gen.). This development may be by analogy of the corresponding liquid clusters. On the other hand, some Karelian dialects (such as Livvi or Olonets) do not allow for gradation in clusters beginning on nasals. Thus, the Olonets Karelian equivalent of Finnish vanhemmat (cf. vanhempi 'older') is vahnembat.

The Karelian phoneme inventory also includes the affricate /tʃ/ (represented in the orthography as č), which may be found geminated and is such subject to quantitative gradation: meččä 'forest' → mečäššä 'in (the) forest'.

=== Votic ===
Votic has two quantities for consonants and vowels, which basically match up with the Finnish counterparts. The Votic phoneme inventory includes a set of fully voiced stops, which Paul Ariste (A Grammar of the Votic Language) describes as being the same as in Russian. Thus, in addition to quantitative alternations between /pː tː kː/ and /p t k/, Votic also has a system of qualitative alternations in which the distinguishing feature is voicing, and so the voiceless stops /p t k/ are known to alternate with /b d ɡ/.

As in Estonian, Karelian, and Eastern dialects of Finnish, the weak grade *ð of /t/ in inherited vocabulary has been lost or assimilated to adjacent sounds in Votic; the weak grade *β of /p/ has similarly become /v/, or assimilated to /m/ in the cluster /mm/. However, the weak grade of /k/ survives, as /ɡ/ before a back vowel or /j ~ dʲ ~ dʒ/ before a front vowel.

A noticeable feature of Votic is that gradation has been extended to several consonant clusters that were not originally affected. As in Finnish, this includes the clusters /ht/ and /hk/ with a voicing-neutral first member, but also further clusters, even several ones introduced only in Russian loans.

Voicing alternations in Votic gradation
Gradation	Example	Translation	Notes
s → z	isä → izässä	'father' → 'father (elat.)'	
rs → rz	karsia → karzid	'to trim' → 'you trim'	
hs [hs] → hz [ɦz]	lahsi → lahzõd	'child' → 'children'	
tš /tʃ/ → dž /dʒ/	retši → redžed	'sleigh' → 'sleighs'	
ntš /ntʃ/ → ndž /ndʒ/	tšentšä → tšendžäd	'shoe' → 'shoes'	
ltš /ltʃ/ → ldž /ldʒ/	jältši → jäldžed	'footprint' → 'footprints'	
k → g	luku → lugud	'number' → 'numbers'	From Proto-Finnic *k → *ɣ.
hk [hk] → hg [ɦɡ]	tuhka → tuhgassa	'ash' → 'ash (elat.)'	
ŋk → ŋg	aŋko → aŋgod	'pitchfork' → 'pitchforks'	Retained intact from Proto-Finnic *ŋk → *ŋg.
pk → bg	šāpka → šābgad	'hat' → 'hats'	A recent Russian loanword.
tk → dg	mutka → mudgad	'hook, curve' → 'hooks, curves'	
sk → zg	pǟsko → pǟzgod	'swallow' → 'swallows'	
šk /ʃk/ → žg /ʒɡ/	šiška → šižgad	'rag' → 'rags'	A recent Russian loanword.
tšk /tʃk/ → džg /dʒɡ/	botška → bodžgad	'barrel' → 'barrels'	A recent Russian loanword.
lk → lg	jalka → jalgad	'foot' → 'feet'	From Proto-Finnic *lk → *lɣ.
rk → rg	purkā → purgad	'to take apart' → 'you take apart'	From Proto-Finnic *rk → *rɣ.

The alternations involving the voiced affricate dž are only found in the Eastern dialects. In the Western dialects, there are several possible weak grade counterparts of tš:

Gradation of tš in Western Votic
Gradation	Example	Translation	Notes
tš → ∅	retši → rēd	'sleigh' → 'sleighs'	
ntš → nď /ndʲ/	tšentšä → tšenďäd	'shoe' → 'shoes'	
ltš → ll	jältši → jälled	'footprint' → 'footprints'	
rtš → rj	särtši → särjed	'roach' → 'roaches'	
htš → hj	mähtšä → mähjäd	'rye porridge' → 'rye porridges'	
stš → zz	iskeä → izzed	'to strike' → 'you strike'	

Further minor variation in these gradation patterns was found down to the level of individual villages.

Votic also has a number of alternations between continuants which are short in the 'weak' grade, and geminates in the 'strong' grade (kassā 'to sprinkle/water' vs. kasan 'I sprinkle/water'), as well as more voicing alternations between palatalized stops, and the alternations between nasal+consonant~nasal+chroneme found in Finnish. Votic also includes alternations in which the 'strong' grade is represented by a short consonant, while the 'weak' grade is represented by a geminate: ritõlõn vs. riďďõlla. For comparison, the Finnish equivalents of these is riitelen 'I quarrel' vs. riidellä 'to quarrel'.

=== Estonian ===
Though otherwise closely related to Votic, consonant gradation in Estonian is quite different from the other Finnic languages. One extremely important difference is the existence of three grades of consonants (alternations like strong grade pada 'pot (nom.)', weak grade paja 'pot (gen.)', overlong grade patta 'pot (ill.)'). This can be said to generally correlate with the existence of three degrees of consonant length (e.g. d, t, and tt), but since the alternation d ~ t occurs only after heavy syllables, and the alternations d ~ tt and t ~ tt occur only after light syllables, there is no single paradigm that has this simple alternation. However, weak grades like v, j, or ∅ that alternate with stops like b, d, or g originate from the weak grade of these stops, and these may still synchronically alternate with the over-long grades (pp, tt, kk) within the same paradigm, giving paradigms with three underlying grades.

Another extremely important feature of Estonian gradation is that, due to the greater loss of word-final segments (both consonants and vowels), the Estonian gradation is an almost entirely opaque process, where the consonant grade (short, long, or overlong) must be listed for each class of wordform. So, for example, embus 'embrace' has the same form for all cases (e.g. genitive embuse), while hammas 'tooth' has weak grade mm in the nominative hammas and partitive hammast, but strong form mb in the genitive hamba and all other cases of the singular. There is a large number of cases in which inflectional endings are identical except for how they affect the consonant grade, e.g. leht 'leaf' belongs to a declension class in which both the genitive and the partitive singular are formed by adding -e, but the genitive takes the weak form (leh-e), while the partitive takes the strong form (leht-e). In the end, the types of generalizations that can be made are that some inflectional categories always take the strong form (e.g. partitive plural, -ma infinitive), some always take the weak form (e.g. -tud participle), some forms may take the overlong form (some partitive singulars, short illative singular), while other inflectional categories are underdetermined for whether they occur with weak or strong grade. In this last case, within a paradigm some forms are constrained to have the same grade and others are constrained to have the opposite grade; thus all present tense forms for the same verb have the same grade, though some verbs have strong (hakkan 'I begin', hakkad 'you begin', etc.) and others have weak (loen 'I read', loed, 'you read', etc.), and the -da infinitive has the opposite grade from the present (hakata 'to begin', lugeda 'to read').

The system of gradation has also expanded to include gradation of all consonant clusters and geminate consonants (generally quantitative), when occurring after short vowels, and vowel gradation between long and overlong vowels, although these are not written except for the distinction between voiceless stops and geminate voiceless stops (e.g. overlong strong grade tt with weak grade t). E.g. linn [linːː], 'city (nom.)' vs. linna [linːɑ] 'city (gen.)'. In consonant clusters, in the strong grade the first consonant is lengthened, e.g. must [musːt], 'black (nom.)' vs. musta [mustɑ] 'black (gen.)'. Before single consonants, long vowels and diphthongs also become overlong in strong forms and remain merely long in weak forms, e.g. kool [koːːl], 'school (nom.)' vs. kooli [koːli] 'school (gen.)'.

== Samic languages ==
Gradation was present in Proto-Samic, and is inherited in most Samic languages. It is different from the gradation found in the Finnic languages in some important aspects:

- Gradation applies to all consonants, even consonant clusters.
- Geminate stops and affricates were realised with preaspiration in Proto-Samic, and were thus phonetically distinct from singletons in more than length alone.
- Rather than featuring lenition in the weak grade, the weak grade generally reflects the original consonant. Instead, it is the strong grade that was modified: single consonants were lengthened into half-long in the strong grade, geminate consonants were lengthened to overlong.
- It only applies in consonants at the end of a stressed syllable; consonants following unstressed syllables remain unlengthened and do not show grade alternations.

Similar to the cases of Veps and Livonian within Finnic, the Southern Sami language at the westernmost end of the Sami language continuum has lost all gradation. In the remaining Sami languages, the strong grade of the singletons merged with the weak grade of geminates, creating a three-quantity distinction between short, long and overlong consonants. In Kildin and Ter Sami, this merger did not affect stops and affricates, due to the additional preaspiration found on original geminates. In the others, the merger affected stops and affricates as well, with the strong grade of singletons receiving secondary preaspiration.

In the Western Samic languages, geminate nasals became pre-stopped, which affected the strong grade of singletons as well (outside Southern Sami) due to the historical merger of these grades. In the languages in closest contact to Finnic (Northern, Inari and Skolt), a number of developments towards the situation in Finnish and Karelian have occurred, such as the change of unlengthened *t to /ð/.

=== Northern Sami ===
Northern Sami has a system of three phonological lengths for consonants, and thus has extensive sets of alternations. Quantity 3 is represented as lengthening of the coda part of a geminate or cluster, which is absent in quantity 2. Quantity 1 consists of only an onset consonant, with the preceding syllable having no coda. In addition, most dialects of Northern Sami feature coda maximisation, which geminates the last member of a cluster in various environments (most commonly in two-consonant clusters of quantity 2, in which the first member is voiced).

Most sonorants and fricatives are only subject to quantitative gradation, but nasals, stops, affricates and the glide /j/ are subject to both quantitative and qualitative changes. Some words alternate between three grades, though not all words do. Note that the following apostrophe marking the over-long grade is not used in the official orthography, although it is generally found in dictionaries.

Some gradation triads include the following:

Continuants	Quantity 3	Quantity 2	Quantity 1
/ð/	đˈđ /ðː.ð/ oađˈđi 'sleeper'	đđ /ð.ð/ oađđit 'to sleep'	đ /ð/ oađán 'I sleep'
/r̥/	hrˈr /r̥ː.r̥/ skuhrˈri 'snorer'	hrr /r̥.r̥/ skuhrrat 'to snore'	hr /r̥/ skuhrai 'S/he snored'
/m/	mˈm /mː.m/ cumˈmá 'kiss'	mm /m.m/ cummát 'kisses'	m /m/ namat 'names'
/s/	sˈs /sː.s/ guosˈsi 'guest'	ss /s.s/ guossit 'guests'	s /s/ viesut 'houses'
/p/	hpp /hː.p/	hp /h.p/	b /b/~/v/
/p/	bb /bː.p/	pp /p.p/	
/t/	htt /hː.t/	ht /h.t/	đ /ð/
/t/	dd /dː.t/	tt /t.t/	
/k/	hkk /hː.k/	hk /h.k/	g /k/~/∅/
/k/	gg /ɡː.k/	kk /k.k/	
/t͡ʃ/	hčč /hː.t͡ʃ/	hč /h.t͡ʃ/	ž /t͡ʃ/
/t͡ʃ/	žž /dː.t͡ʃ/	čč /t.t͡ʃ/	
/t͡s/	hcc /h:.t͡s/	hc /h.t͡s/	z /t͡s/
/t͡s/	zz /dː.t͡s/	cc /t.t͡s/	

== Samoyedic languages ==
=== Nganasan ===
Nganasan, alone of the Samoyedic languages (or indeed any Uralic languages east of Finnic), shows systematic qualitative gradation of stops and fricatives. Gradation occurs in intervocalic position as well as in consonant clusters consisting of a nasal and a stop. Note that /h/ and /ŋh/ descend from historical /p/ and /mp/, respectively. Examples of Nganasan consonant gradation can be seen in the table below. The first form given is always the nominative singular, the latter the genitive singular (which was marked in Proto-Samoyedic by the suffix *-n, resulting in a closed syllable).

Gradation	Example	Gloss
h : b	bahi : babi	'wild reindeer'
t : ð	ŋuta : ŋuða	'berry'
k : ɡ	məku : məɡu	'back'
s : dʲ	basa : badʲa	'iron'
ŋh : mb	koŋhu : kombu	'wave'
nt : nd	dʲintə : dʲində	'bow'
ŋk : ŋɡ	bəŋkə : bəŋɡə	'sod hut'
ns : nʲdʲ	bənsə : bənʲdʲə	'all'

The original conditions of the Nganasan gradation can be shown to be identical to gradation in Finnic and Samic; that is, radical/syllabic gradation according to syllable closure, and suffixal/rhythmic gradation according to a syllable being of odd or even number, with rhythmic gradation particularly well-preserved.

=== Selkup ===
A limited form of consonant gradation is found in the Ket dialect of Selkup. In certain environments, geminate stops can alternate with short (allophonically voiced) ones, under the usual conditions for radical gradation. E.g.:

Gradation	Example	Gloss
pː : b	qopːə : qobən	skin, hide
tː : d	utːə : udən	hand

== See also ==
- Lenition
- Grammatischer Wechsel
- Kluge's Law
- Consonant harmony
