= Saari, Finland =

Former municipality in Finland

Coordinates: 61°41′45″N 29°41′00″E

Coat of arms of Saari

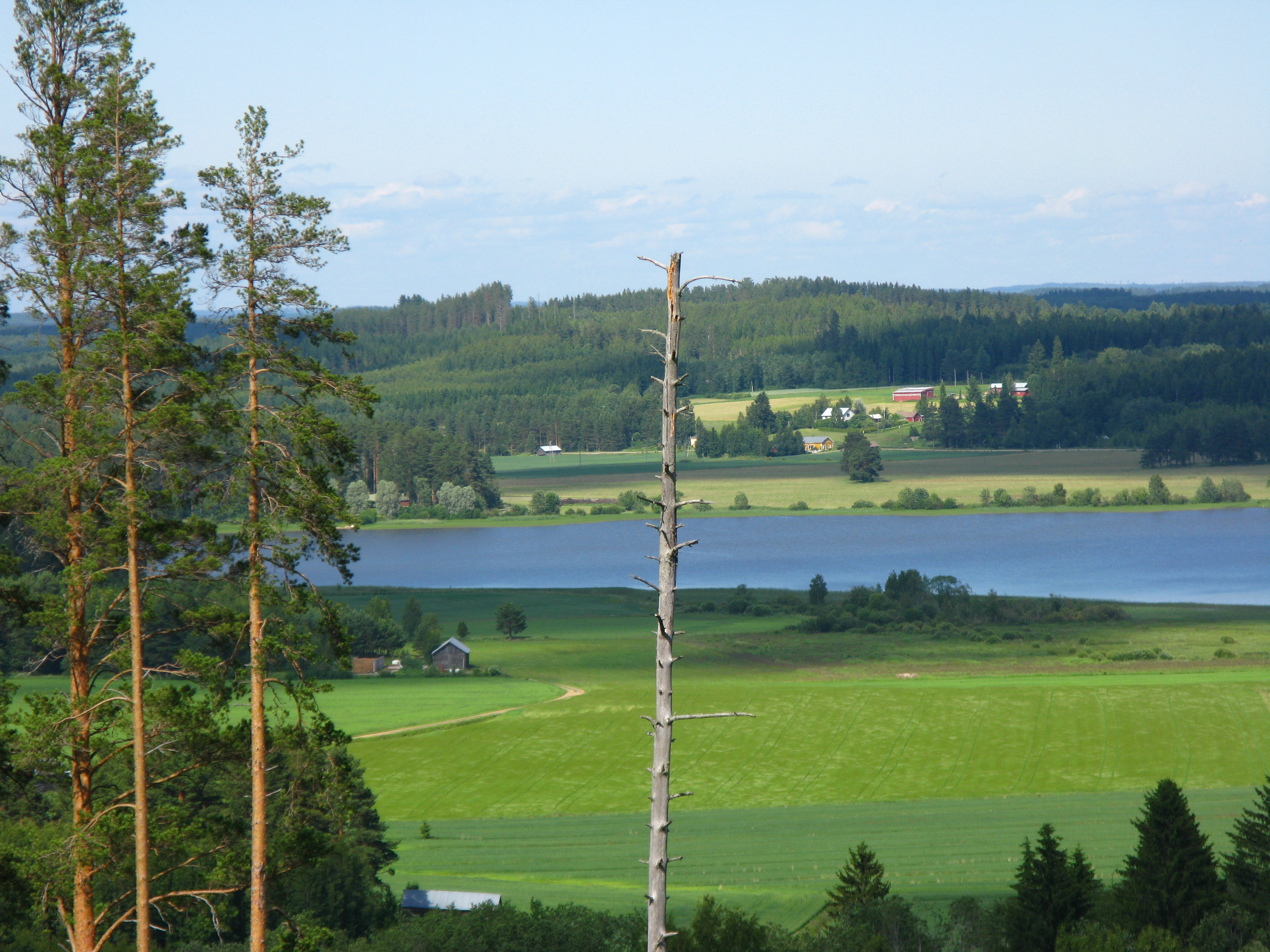

Saari (literally Island) is a former municipality of Finland. It was located in the province of Southern Finland and is part of the South Karelia region. The municipality had a population of 1,392 (2004) and covered an area of 183.08 km^{2} of which 15.70 km^{2} is water. The population density was 8.5673 inhabitants per km^{2}.

The municipality was unilingually Finnish. Before the municipality was dissolved, Saari's neighboring municipalities were Kesälahti, Parikkala, Punkaharju, and Uukuniemi.

Saari was annexed to Parikkala and Uukuniemi municipalities on 1 January 2005. The new municipality was named Parikkala.

== Notable people ==
- Aleksanteri Aava (1883–1956), poet
- Jorma Härkönen (born 1956), middle-distance runner
- Olavi Litmanen (born 1945), footballer and the father of Jari Litmanen
- Suvi Mikkonen (born 1988), taekwondo practitioner
- Tuomo Pekkanen (born 1934), philologist and university teacher

== See also ==
- Akonpohja
