= Litmanen (surname) =

Litmanen is a Finnish surname. Notable people with the surname include:

- Jari Litmanen (born 1971), Finnish footballer, son of Olavi
- Olavi Litmanen (born 1945), Finnish footballer
