= Special officer =

Special officer may refer to:

- Special police officer
- Special officer (Finland), category of personnel in Finnish army
- Special Officer of the United States Secret Service
- Special Officer of the Federal Reserve Police, United States

== See also ==
- Specialist Officer
