= Johannes Wilskman =

Finnish judge and politician (1866–1952)

Johan (Johannes) Eliel (J. E.) Wilskman (26 March 1866 – 27 May 1952; surname from 1906 until 1925 Viljomaa) was a Finnish judge and politician, born in Kesälahti. He was a member of the Parliament of Finland from 1907 to 1908 and from 1911 to 1913, representing the Finnish Party.
