= Pekka Hälvä =

Finnish schoolteacher and politician (1876–1944)

Pekka Juho (P. J.) Hälvä (7 December 1876 – 19 December 1944) was a Finnish schoolteacher and politician, born in Uukuniemi. He was a member of the Parliament of Finland from 1913 to 1919, representing the Young Finnish Party until December 1918 and the National Progressive Party after that.
