= Niukkala =

Village in Parikkala, Finland

Coordinates: 61°45.255′N 29°53.595′E

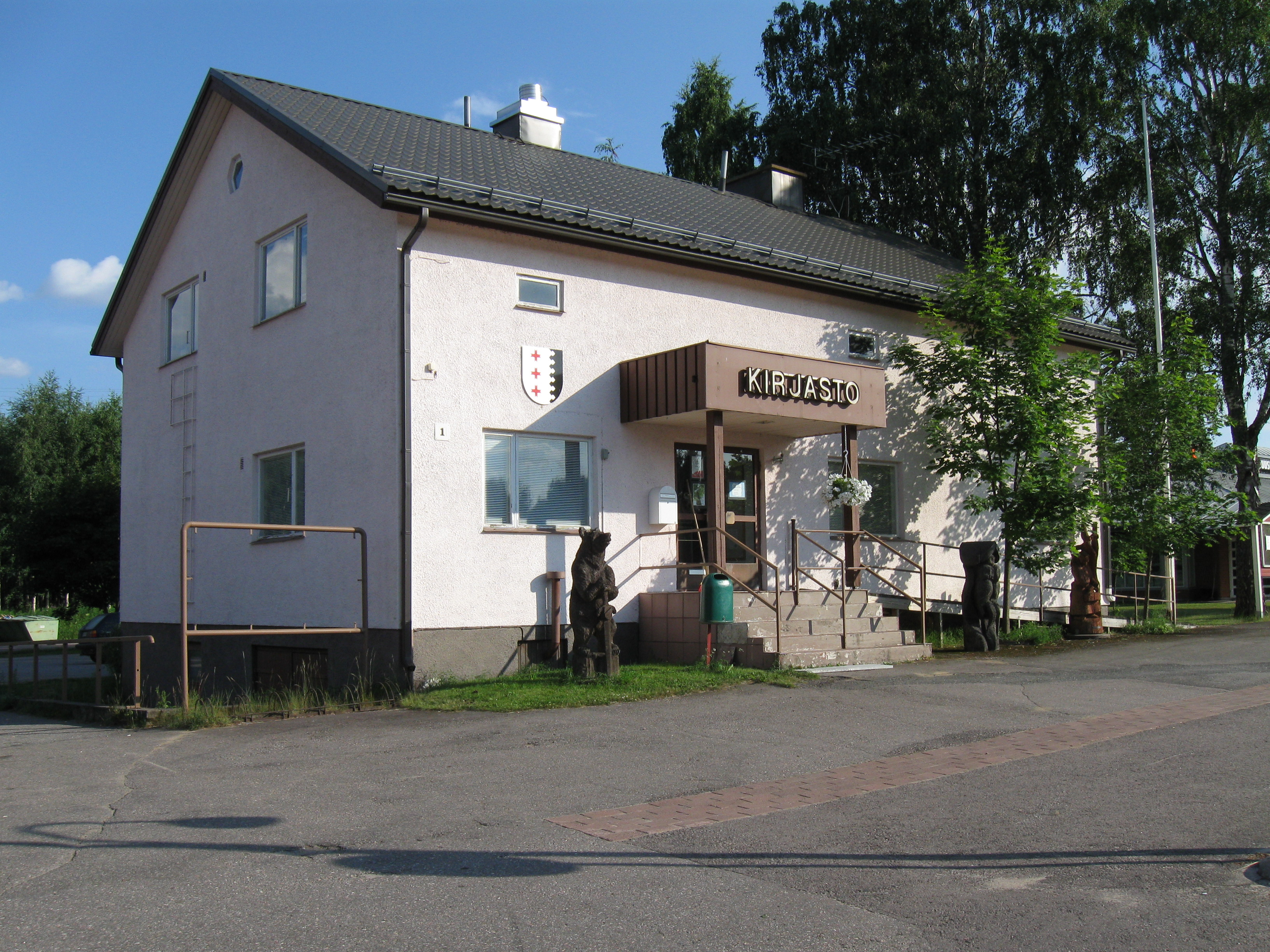
A library in the village center

Niukkala (Finnish pronunciation: [ˈniu̯kːɑlɑ]) is a village in the municipality of Parikkala in the region of South Karelia, Finland, on the shore of Lake Pyhäjärvi.

The village belonged to Uukuniemi municipality until the beginning of 2005, when Uukuniemi was merged with Parikkala. Although the village was the former administrative center of the Uukuniemi municipality, it never formed an urban area due to the too small population base.

Niukkala offers services such as a general store, a coffee shop, a sports field and a library.
