= Proto-Finnic language =

Ancestor of the Finnic languages

Proto-Finnic
- Proto-Balto-Finnic
- Reconstruction of: Finnic languages
- Reconstructed ancestor: Proto-Uralic

Proto-Finnic or Proto-Baltic-Finnic is the common ancestor of the Finnic languages, which include the national languages Finnish and Estonian. Proto-Finnic is not attested in any texts, but has been reconstructed by linguists. Proto-Finnic is itself descended ultimately from Proto-Uralic.

== Background ==
Three stages of Proto-Finnic are distinguished in literature.

- Early Proto-Finnic, the last common ancestor of the Finnic languages and its closest external relatives — usually understood to be the Sami languages, though also the Mordvinic languages may derive from this stage (see Finno-Samic languages). This reconstruction state appears to be almost identical to Proto-Uralic.
- Middle Proto-Finnic, an earlier stage in the development on Finnic, used in Kallio (2007) for the point at which the language had developed its most characteristic differences from Proto-Uralic (mainly: the loss of several consonant phonemes from the segment inventory, including all palatalized consonants).
- Late Proto-Finnic, the last common ancestor of Finnish and Estonian, and hence of the Gulf of Finland Finnic subgroup. South Estonian and the Livonian language had already diverged at this point.

=== Era and region ===
Views on when and where Proto-Finnic was spoken have varied over the years. Many of the older sources do not recognize Middle Proto-Finnic, recognizing only Early and Late Proto-Finnic:

Year	Author(s)	Early Proto-Finnic	Middle Proto-Finnic	Late Proto-Finnic	Notes
1965	Décsy	c. 400 BC–1 AD		1–1000 AD	
1977	Sammallahti	c. ...–1000 BC		c. 1000–200 BC	^{[a]}
1981	Korhonen	c. 1500–1000 BC	c. 1000 BC–1 AD		^{[b]}
2012–2014	Kallio	c. 1800–500 BC	c. 500 BC–200 AD	split by the end of first millennium AD	
2018	Lang	c. 1200–800..500 BC	c. 800..500 BC–1 AD	c. 1 AD–800 AD	^{[c]}

^{a. Sammallahti places the divergence of South Estonian from Late Proto-Finnic (myöhäiskantasuomi, which he uses to refer to the stage before that point) at around 600–500 BC.}

^{b. Korhonen recognizes a distinction between Middle and Late Proto-Finnic but does not specify the date of transition.}

^{c. Lang places the transition from Early to Middle Proto-Finnic somewhere between 800–500 BC.}

Proto-Finnic is thought to have been spoken around the Gulf of Finland, but theories on its earlier location have varied; traditionally it has been considered that Proto-Finnic arrived first on the eastern coast of the Gulf of Finland, but it has also been suggested that Middle Proto-Finnic was spoken in an area in modern-day Estonia and northeastern parts of Latvia.

=== Changes up to Late Proto-Finnic ===
- *ï > *a. This change is shared by several other western Uralic languages, including the Sami and Mordvinic languages.
- *ä...ä > *a...e.
- Word-initial deaffrication:
  - *č > *š.
  - *ć > *ś.
- *ŋ and *x are lost as phonemes. Between vowels they are usually lost entirely, triggering lengthening of a preceding vowel.
  - In certain cases, this may have proceeded through vocalization to *w. Compare e.g. PU *mexi- > PF *möö- "to sell"; PU *sewi- > PF *söö- "to eat".
  - Before dental/alveolar consonants, both consonants usually vocalize to *w.
  - The cluster *ŋk remains, but *ŋ in this case is now simply an allophone of *n rather than an independent phoneme.
- Depalatalisation:
  - *ć > *c.
  - *ś > *s.
  - *δ́ > *δ.
  - *ń > *n.
- Lengthening of open vowels:
  - *a > *oo (including former *ï) and *ä > *ee, when the vowels appear
    1. in an open syllable, and
    2. followed by a non-semivowel sonorant consonant (*m, *n, *l, *r, *δ), and
    3. followed by an original non-open vowel *i (also denoted *ə, *e).
  - E.g.: PU *ńäli- > PF *ńeele- "to swallow"; PU *ńëli > PF *nooli "arrow"
- *δ > *t.
- Sequences of a vowel and syllable-final semivowel *j or *w are reinterpreted as diphthongs: *aj > *ai, *aw > *au etc. Consequently, these consonants can no longer close a syllable (relevant for consonant gradation). Any diphthongs ending in *u become subject to vowel harmony and split into *u and *ü accordingly.
  - In some cases, there remained alternations between the consonantal and vocalic form, e.g. in *käüdäk "to walk" ~ *kävi "walked" (Finnish käydä ~ kävi).
- Monophthongisation of some diphthongs in non-initial syllables:
  - *au > *o
  - *ei > *i
  - *eu > *u, *eü > *ü
- Word-final *-e becomes *-i.
- *ti is assibilated to *ci.
  - The change was blocked if another coronal obstruent preceded, i.e. *tti, *cti, *sti, *šti (thus Finnish kaksi "two" ~ kahden < Pre-Proto-Finnic *kakti, but lehti "leaf" ~ lehden < *lešti).
  - The change was fed by *ei > *i, which also caused assibilation.
- Apocope of final *-i when at least two syllables preceded. This occurred after assibilation, which created alternations between final *-c and medial *-t- in some nouns (e.g. Finnish nouns in -us, genitive -uden, essive -utena).
- Syncope/contraction of medial *-e- between *c, *l, *n, *r, *s, *š, *t and a following *k, *n or *t. Syncope was prevented if more than one consonant followed the *-e-. If more than one consonant preceded, consonant clusters were often simplified by dropping the first member of the cluster.
  - Examples of syncope before *t are widespread, owing to the many endings beginning with this consonant, including the partitive singular, genitive plural, infinitive and various passive forms. Finnish examples are vesi "water", partitive vettä (< *vetetä), lohi "salmon", partitive lohta (< *lošeta), purra "to bite" (< *purdak < *puretak).
  - Syncope before *n was also regular, but there were fewer environments in which it could occur. It occurred most notably in the potential mood and the past active participle of verbs. Many of the clusters ending in *n were later simplified by assimilation, either by assimilating the *n to the preceding consonant, or in some cases the reverse. Finnish examples are purren, purrut (forms of purra "bite"; < *purnen, *purnut < *purenen, *purenut), pessen, pessyt (forms of pestä "to wash", < *pesnen, *pesnüt < *pesenen, *pesenüt). Contraction also occurred in the essive singular of nominals, but these forms were often restored analogically. Finnish still possesses a few obsolete or fossilised cases of contracted essives, e.g. toissa "on the second-last (time)" (< *toicna < *toicena), a fossilised essive form of toinen "second".
  - Syncope before *k was regular but there were few environments in which it could occur. It is seen primarily in imperative forms of verbs, which are formed with a -k- suffix. Finnish examples are olkaa (imperative of olla "be"; < *olkade < *volekate), maatkaa (forms of maata "lie down"; < *magatkate < *makatekate).
  - Syncope also occurred between *m and *t in several cases, giving *-nt-. This occurred perhaps in all cases, but it was reverted later in many cases. An example in Finnish is lumi "snow", partitive lunta (< Pre-Proto-Finnic *lumeta). Older Finnish had more examples of this, which were later restored by analogy.
  - Two words show the contraction *-ket- > *-kt-: *näktäk "to see" < *näketäk (Finnish nähdä) and *tektäk "to do" < *teketäk (Finnish tehdä).
- Application of radical gradation in closed syllables, causing voicing of short obstruents and shortening of geminate stops. This occurred after apocope, or was still productive at the time, as the newly consonant-final syllables resulting from apocope triggered gradation as well.
- *š > *h
  - The clusters *tš and *kš lose their first component to also become simple *h.
- *č > *t, but *čk develops differently in South Estonian, see below.
- In non-initial syllables, low-vowel i-diphthongs are raised:
  - *äi > *ei
  - *ai > *oi when the preceding syllable contains a non-rounded vowel.
  - *ai > *ei elsewhere.
  - Some time after this change, *ei > *i again in non-initial syllables. This latter change occurred late in Proto-Finnic and did not trigger assibilation as the earlier *ei > *i change did. It also followed the southern Finnic backing of *e to *ë (Estonian õ etc.) in back-harmony words, as only *ei was affected, while *ëi remained unchanged. Thus, different Finnic varieties show different outcomes, such as: *muna "egg", plural stem *munai- > *munei- > Finnish muna, muni- but southern Finnic munëi- > Votic muna, munõi-, Võro muna, munnõ-, Estonian muna, mune- (with õ > e through loss of vowel harmony).
- Loss of glides before vowels:
  - *ji > *i. This change followed the preceding one, as former *eji becomes *ei but does not end up as *i: *peni "dog", plural stem *peneji- > Finnish peni, penei-, Võro pini, pin(n)e-.
  - *je > *e word-initially.
  - *vu > *u.
  - *vü > *ü.
  - *vo > *o. This change must have happened after Proto-Finnic broke up, as Estonian and Võro võtma "to take" preserved the consonant until after the dialectal unrounding of *o to *õ (which prevented the change from affecting it). Compare Finnish ottaa, Veps otta, where it did apply as there was no unrounding in those dialects.

== Phonology ==
The sounds of Proto-Finnic can be reconstructed through the comparative method.

=== Transcription ===
Reconstructed Proto-Finnic is traditionally transcribed using the Uralic Phonetic Alphabet. The following UPA and related conventions are adopted in this article for transcribing Proto-Finnic forms:

- Front vowels /æ ø y/ are denoted with a diaeresis, as in the Estonian orthography: ⟨ä ö ü⟩.
- The affricate /t͡s/ is written as ⟨c⟩.
- The voiceless velar fricative /x/ is written as ⟨h⟩.
- Long consonants and vowels are written doubled: ⟨aa ee ii pp tt kk cc⟩ etc.
- Half-long consonants are written with a following apostrophe: ⟨p' t' k' c'⟩.
- The labial semivowel /ʋ ~ w/ is written as ⟨v⟩.
- Diphthongs are written with two vowel letters when a consonant follows: ⟨au ai⟩ (not ⟨av aj⟩).

=== Consonants ===
The Proto-Finnic consonant inventory had relatively few phonemic fricatives, much like that of the modern Finnic languages. Voicing was not phonemically contrastive, but the language did possess voiced allophones of certain voiceless consonants.

The table below lists the consonantal phonemes of Late Proto-Finnic. Phones written in parentheses represent allophones and are not independent phonemes.

Proto-Finnic consonants
		Labial	Dental/ Alveolar	Palatal	Velar
Nasals		*m /m/	*n /n/		([ŋ])
Plosives	Voiceless	*p /p/	*t /t/		*k /k/
Plosives	Voiced	([b])	([d])		([ɡ])
Affricate			*c /t͡s/		
Fricatives	Voiceless		*s /s/		*h /x/
Fricatives	Voiced	([β])	([ð])		([ɣ])
Trill			*r /r/		
Approximant		*v /w/		*j /j/	
Lateral			*l /l/		

- *h had evolved fairly late from the Middle Proto-Finnic postalveolar sibilant *š. It may have been realised as [h] before another consonant.
- *v was perhaps realised as labiodental [ʋ] when a vowel followed, rather than a true bilabial
- [ŋ] was an allophone of *n before *k. The original Proto-Uralic phoneme *ŋ had been lost and changed into other sounds, except in this position.
- [b β], [d ð] and [ɡ ɣ] were allophones of *p, *t and *k respectively, and developed as a result of consonant gradation.
- Final *-k was probably unreleased [k̚], due to its loss in many daughter languages.

Proto-Finnic possessed two phonemic levels of consonant duration, short and long (geminate). The contrast itself had been inherited from Proto-Uralic, but was considerably expanded: all consonants except *r, *h, *j and *w could be short or long. The three plosives and the affricate *c /ts/ also possessed a half-long duration ([pˑ], [tˑ], [kˑ] and [tsˑ]), but these appear to have been in complementary (allophonic) distribution with fully long consonants, and therefore are not thought to have been phonemic. They appeared in predictable positions as a result of consonant gradation, like the voiced fricatives.

==== Consonant gradation ====
Consonant gradation was a process of lenition that affected the obstruents. Short plosives became voiced fricatives, while long plosives became half-long:

Strong grade	Weak grade
p	b ([β], [b])
t	d ([ð], [d])
k	g ([ɣ], [ɡ])
s	h [x]
pp	p' [pˑ]
tt	t' [tˑ]
kk	k' [kˑ]
cc [tt͡s]	c' [t͡sˑ]

Voiced plosives occurred after nasals (mb nd ŋg), voiced fricatives in all other weak grade environments.

It is unclear if single *c gradated, and if so, into what. No Finnic language has consonant gradation for former *c, both grades result in the same outcome (mostly s).

Gradation occurred in two different environments, and can therefore be split into two types:

- Radical gradation affected consonants that appeared at the beginning of a closed syllable (a syllable that ended in a consonant). It affected consonants preceded by a vowel or sonorant, but not those preceded by another obstruent.
- Suffixal gradation affected consonants that appeared at the beginning of a non-initial odd-numbered syllable. It only affected consonants preceded by a vowel and did not affect the geminates.

It is unclear whether consonant gradation was a Finnic innovation, or a retention of an old Uralic feature that was lost in most other Uralic branches. It is likely that it was inherited from an earlier stage that was also the ancestor of the Sami languages, which have gradation that is very similar to that found in the Finnic languages. However, it was still productive after certain sound changes specific to Finnic, such as the apocope of final *-i, so it was probably present as a phonetic "post-processing" rule (a surface filter) over a long period of time. It is no longer fully productive in any Finnic language, but most languages still retain large amounts of words preserving the earlier alternations.

=== Vowels ===
The Proto-Finnic vowel inventory is reconstructed to a great similarity to that of modern Finnish, although the distribution of the sounds was different. The following table lists the monophthong vowels reconstructable for Proto-Finnic.

Proto-Finnic monophthongs
	Front neutral	Front	Back
Close	i, ii /i/, /iː/	ü, üü /y/, /yː/	u, uu /u/, /uː/
Mid	e, ee /e/, /eː/	(ö), öö (/ø/), /øː/	o, oo, (ë) /o/, /oː/, ([ɤ])
Open		ä, ää /æ/, /æː/	a, aa /ɑ/, /ɑː/

All vowels could occur both short and long. In Proto-Uralic, rounded vowels /u y o/ (*u, *ü, *o) did not occur in non-initial syllables, but because of sound changes, they emerged in Proto-Finnic.

The short unrounded mid back vowel *ë was not an independent vowel, but appeared as the counterpart of the front vowel *e in the system of harmony. It merged with *e in Northern Finnic. See below under vowel harmony for more details.

The status of short *ö is unclear. It was not present in ancestral Proto-Uralic, and many instances of ö found in modern Finnic languages have only developed after Proto-Finnic, due to various sound changes. For example, Finnish has öy from *eü: löytä- 'to find', köysi 'rope' < Proto-Finnic *leütä-, *keüci, while Estonian has unrounded the diphthong instead, giving leida- and köis. Short ö was also generally added to the system by researchers for reasons of symmetry, to complete the system of vowel harmony (see below). This happened in Finnish näkö 'sight' < Proto-Finnic *näko, but not in Votic näko.

The existence of öö is clear, as this sound had regularly evolved from other combinations of sounds, in words of Uralic origin (e.g. *söö- 'to eat' ← Proto-Uralic *sewi-).

==== Diphthongs ====
Proto-Finnic also possessed diphthongs, which were formed by combinations of a short vowel with the vowels /i/, /y/ and /u/, or equivalently with the semivowels /j/ and /w/.

Proto-Finnic diphthongs
	Front + *i	Front + *ü	Front + *u	Back + *i	Back + *u
Close	*üi /yi/	*iü /iy/	*iu /iu/	*ui /ui/	
Mid to close	*ei, *öi /ei/, /øi/	*eü /ey/	*eu (*ëu) /eu ~ ɤu/	*oi /oi/	*ou /ou/
Open to close	*äi /æi/	*äü /æy/		*ai /ɑi/	*au /ɑu/

No length contrast occurred in diphthongs. A long vowel followed by a close vowel as a suffix was shortened: e.g. the imperfect forms of *saa- "to receive", *söö- "to eat" were *sai, *söi. This process is the only reconstructible source of *öi, *üi.

==== Vowel harmony ====
Proto-Finnic is reconstructed with a system of vowel harmony that is very similar to the one found in modern Finnish. Vowels in non-initial syllables had either a front or a back vowel, depending on the quality of the vowel of the first syllable. If the first syllable contained a front vowel, non-initial syllables would contain front vowels as well, while back vowels in the first syllable would be matched with back vowels in the other syllables. Thus, all inflectional and derivational suffixes came in two forms, a front-harmonic and a back-harmonic form.

=== Phonotactics ===
Stress was not contrastive. Words were stressed in a trochaic pattern, with primary stress on the first syllable of a word, and secondary stress on every following odd-numbered syllable.

The occurrence of two-vowel sequences was much more restricted in non-initial syllables than in initial syllables. Long vowels were absent, and some diphthongs only occurred as a result of the late contraction of disyllabic *Vji to diphthongal *Vi but were otherwise absent. Some modern Finnic languages have redeveloped long vowels and additional diphthongs in non-initial syllables as a result of the loss of certain consonants (generally d, g and h).

Root words included at least two moras, and generally followed the structure CVCV, CVCCV, CVVCV. Rarer root types included monosyllabic roots, CVV, with either a long vowel (e.g. *maa "land, earth"; *puu "tree, wood") or a diphthong (e.g. *täi "louse", *käü-däk "to walk"); roots with three syllables: CVCVCV (e.g. *petägä "pine"; *vasara "hammer") or CVCCVCV (e.g. *kattila "kettle"); and roots with a long vowel in a closed syllable: CVVCCV (e.g. *mëëkka "sword"). A syllable could begin and end with at most one consonant. Any consonant phoneme could begin or end a syllable, but word-finally only the alveolar consonants (*l, *n, *t, *r, *s and perhaps *c) and the velars *k and *h occurred. Final *-k and *-h were often lost in the later Finnic languages, but occasionally left traces of their former presence.

Word-internal consonant clusters were limited to two elements originally. However, the widespread syncope of -e- (detailed above) could cause a cluster to come into contact with a third consonant. When such innovative large clusters appeared, the result was the deletion of one or more elements in the cluster, usually the first. Likewise, the apocope of -i after two or more syllables could create word-final clusters, which were also simplified. This led to alternations that are still seen, though unproductive, in e.g. Finnish:

- *laps-i ("child", nominative) + *-ta > *las-ta (partitive), with medial simplification *-pst- > *-st-
- stem *tuhant- ("thousand"):
  - > *tuhat (nominative), with final simplification *-nt > *-t
  - > *tuhatta (partitive), with medial simplification *-ntt- > *-tt-
- stem *kolmant- ("third")
  - > *kolmas (nominative), with final simplification (but note assibilation *t > *s, so this reflects earlier *-nci before apocope)
  - > *kolmatta (partitive), with medial simplification *-ntt- > *-tt- (as assibilation shows that this had a stem-final vowel originally, this reflects earlier *-ntet- before syncope)
- root kansi: *kante- ("lid") + causative *-(t)ta- > *kattaa "to cover", with medial simplification *-ntt- > *-tt-

Note in the examples of *tuhatta and *kolmatta that Proto-Finnic did not initially tolerate clusters of a sonorant plus a geminate consonant (i.e. clusters like *-ntt-). Through loanwords, analogy and further syncope, these have only later become permissible in the Finnic languages.

Traditionally a single three-consonant cluster *-str- has been reconstructed for a small group of words showing *-tr- in Southern Finnic and in Eastern Finnish, *-sr- in Karelian and Veps, and /-hr-/ in Western Finnish. This has recently been suggested to be reinterpreted as a two-consonant cluster *-cr- with an affricate as the initial member.

== Grammar ==
All inflectional and derivational endings containing *a or *u also had front-vowel variants with ä and ü, which matched the vowels in the word stem following the rules of vowel harmony. *o did not follow this rule, as noted above.

Endings which closed the final syllable of a word triggered radical gradation on that syllable. An ending could also open a previously closed syllable, which would undo the gradation. Suffixal gradation affected the endings themselves. For example, partitive *-ta would appear as *-da when added to a two-syllable word ending in a vowel (e.g. *kala, *kalada "fish"), but as *-ta after a third syllable or a consonant (*veci, *vettä "water").

=== Nouns and adjectives ===
==== Cases ====
Proto-Finnic nouns declined in at least 13 cases. Adjectives did not originally decline, but adjective-noun agreement was innovated in Proto-Finnic. The plural of the nominative and accusative was marked with the ending *-t, while the plural of the other cases used *-i-. The genitive and accusative singular were originally distinct (genitive *-n, accusative *-m), but had fallen together when final *-m became *-n through regular sound change. Some pronouns had a different accusative ending, which distinguished them.

The following cases were present:

Case	Singular ending	Plural ending	Meaning/use
Nominative	∅	*-t	Subject, object of imperative
Accusative	*-n (also -t)	*-t	Complete (telic) object
Genitive	*-n	*-ten (-den) *-iden	Possession, relation
Partitive	*-ta (-da)	*-ita (-ida)	Partial object, indefinite amount
Locative cases
Inessive	*-ssa	*-issa	Being inside
Elative	*-sta	*-ista	Motion out of
Illative	*-sen (-hen)	*-ihen	Motion into
Adessive	*-lla	*-illa	Being on/at
Ablative	*-lta	*-ilta	Motion off/from
Allative	*-len / *-lek	*-ilen / *-ilek	Motion onto/towards
Other cases
Essive	*-na	*-ina	Being, acting as
Translative	*-ksi	*-iksi	Becoming, turning into
Abessive	*-tta(k)	*-itta(k)	Without, lacking
Comitative	*-nek	*-inek	With, in company of
Instructive	*-n	*-in	With, by means of

The genitive plural was formed in two different ways:

- The "western" type was formed by adding the singular ending *-n to the nominative plural *-t, with an additional fill vowel: *-t-en. This then became *-den in most cases through consonant gradation.
- The "eastern" type was formed by adding the above suffix to the plural stem: *-i-den.

Both types are still found in Finnish, although unevenly distributed. In the western type, the regular loss of -d- after an unstressed (even-numbered) syllable has created forms such as -ain (< *-a-den), which are now archaic, or dialectal.

==== Locative cases ====
The reconstructed locative cases of Proto-Finnic can be classified according to a three-way contrast (to, in and from a state) in each of the two series of locative cases: inner –s- ("inside") and outer –l- ("outside", "upon", and other grammaticalized functions to denote "possessor", "instrument", etc.), to give the following system of six locative cases.

System	Entering	Residing	Exiting
Inner	sVn "into" (illative)	ssA (<*s+nA) "in" (inessive)	stA "from (in)" (elative)
Outer	*len, *lek? "onto" (allative)	llA (<*l+nA) "on" (adessive)	ltA "from on" (ablative)

In the above, A stands for either a or ä depending on vowel harmony, and V for an epenthetic vowel. Note that -nA is reconstructible as the Proto-Finno-Ugric locative marker (the ancestor of the Finnic essive case), -tA the separative ("from") (ancestor of the partitive case), and –n, –s or –k the lative ("to").

This system is probably a Finnic innovation, although the –s and –l cases have corresponding forms in some other Uralic languages (Sami and Volgaic; and Permian, respectively).

==== Adjective comparison ====
Adjectives formed comparatives using the suffix *-mpa. This suffix survives in all Finnic languages, although in several the nominative has been replaced with -mpi for unclear reasons.

Only the northernmost Finnic languages have a distinct superlative suffix, like Finnish -in ~ -impa-. The suffix was possibly originally a consonantal stem *-im(e)-, which was modified to resemble the comparative more closely in Finnish. Its consonantal nature is apparent in an older, now-obsolete essive case form of the superlative in Finnish, which ended in -inna (< *-im-na < *-ime-na with syncope).

==== Possessive suffixes ====
Proto-Finnic had a series of possessive suffixes for nominals, which acted partly as genitives. These have been lost from productive use in all southern languages (traces remain in e.g. folk poetry). The system given below may therefore represent Proto-Northern Finnic rather than Proto-Finnic proper.

Possessor	Single possessed	Plural possessed
First person singular	*-mi	*-nni
Second person singular	*-ci ~ *-ti	*-nci
Third person singular	*-hA ~ *-sA *-hVn, *-sVn	*-nsA *-nsVn
First person plural	*-mVn *-mVk	*-nnVn (*-mmVn?) *-nnVk
Second person plural	*-tVn *-tVk	*-ndVn *-ndVk
Third person plural	*-hVk ~ *-sVk	*-nsVk

The original vowels in the plural possessor endings are not settled: evidence exists for both *A (that is, *a ~ *ä) and *e. Laakso (2001) recognizes variation only for 1PP and 2PP (giving *A for 3PP). Hakulinen (1979), giving an Early Proto-Finnic paradigm, does not include vowel-final variants for 3PS.

Possessive suffixes were ordered after case endings, and typically attach to the oblique vowel stem: e.g. *sormi: *sorme-mi 'my finger'.

The number-of-possessed contrast is by the 20th century lost everywhere except in the Southeastern Tavastian dialect of Finnish, around the municipalities of Iitti and Orimattila, and even there only in the nominative in the first and second person singular. The original 3PS / 3PP contrast is lost everywhere except Ingrian. In most cases, both ending variants however still remain in use, with different endings generalized in different varieties. Standard Finnish adopts 1PP -mme (derived from the singular possessed series, with analogical mm based on the verbal inflection), but 1PS -ni, 2PP -nne (derived from the plural possessed series, with regular *nd > nn); and adopts 3PS -nsA in the nominative, illative and instructive (nominative käte-nsä 'her/his hand'), but -Vn (< *-hen) in all other cases (e.g. inessive kädessä-än 'in her/his hand'). New plurality-of-possessed marking has emerged in the Soikkola dialect of Ingrian, suffixing the usual nominative plural marker -t, e.g. venehe-mme-t 'our boats'.

Old Finnish shows two archaic features in the possessive paradigm: the number-of-possessed contrast (singular poikaise-mi 'my son', versus plural luu-ni 'my bones'), and the 2nd person singular ending may attach also to the consonant stem of a nominal, with a non-assibilated ending -ti (the expected regular development before old *s, *t and *h < *š): e.g. rakkaus: rakkaut-ti 'your love', tutkain: tutkain-ti 'your prod' (modern Finnish rakkaute-si, tutkaime-si).

A series of dual possessors has been proposed to account for the two different variants of 3PS, 1PP and 2PP endings; the variants ending in *-n would match with the dual possessor endings in Proto-Samic. This hypothesis has not been generally accepted.

=== Verbs ===
==== Finite forms ====
Proto-Finnic inherited at least the following grammatical moods:

- Indicative mood – suffix: present none (but -k- in the passive), past -i-
- Imperative mood – suffix: -k(a)-
- Optative mood (possibly) – suffix: -ko-
- Conditional mood – suffix: -ksi- or -isi-
- Potential mood – suffix: -ne-

The indicative mood distinguished between present (which also functioned as future) and past tense, while the other moods had no tense distinctions. New "perfect" and "pluperfect" tenses had also been formed. These were created using a form of the copula *oldak "to be" and a participle.

There were six forms for each mood, for three persons and two numbers. In addition, there were two more forms. One was a form that is often called "passive" or "fourth person", and indicated an unspecified person. The second was the "connegative" form, which was used together with the negative verb to form negated sentences.

All moods except the imperative shared more or less the same endings:

	Singular	Plural	
	Singular	Present	Imperfect
First person	*-n	*-mmek / *-mmak	*-j-mek / *-j-mak
Second person	*-t	*-ttek / *-ttak	*-j-dek / *-j-dak
Third person	*-pi (-βi), ∅	*-βat	*-j-∅
Passive	*-tta- + (tense/mood suffix) + *-sen (-hen)		
Connegative	*-k		

The first and second person plural endings show evidence (reflected in Savo and Southern Ostrobothnian Finnish and in Karelian) for an earlier present tense marker, assimilated with the following consonant. This is normally reconstructed as *-k- (*-km- > *-mm-, *-kt- > *-tt-), on the assumption of this ending being originally identical with *-k found in the connegative and in the imperative mood.

The variation between forms with *-ek and forms with *-a in the 1st and 2nd person plural reflects a former distinction between the dual and the plural (respectively), although this has not been attested from any Finnic variety. Estonian and Western Finnish continue *-ek, Votic and Eastern Finnic *-a(k).

The third person forms only had an ending in the present indicative. In all other tenses and moods, there was no ending and the singular and plural were identical. The 3rd person singular was entirely unmarked in South Estonian: the Late Proto-Finnic ending had evolved from the participle *-pa during the Middle Proto-Finnic stage, and this innovation had not reached South Estonian, which was already separated.

The imperative had its own set of endings:

	Singular	Plural
First person		-ka-da/e-mme/a
Second person	-k	-ka-da/e
Third person	-ka-hen	-ka-hen
Passive	-tta-ka-hen	
Connegative	-ga-k	

There is also some evidence of a distinct optative mood, which is preserved in Finnish as -os (second-person singular). It is reconstructed as *-go-s, consisting of the mood suffix *-ko- and the second-person singular ending *-s. This mood suffix gave rise to alternative imperative forms in some languages, such as Finnish third-person singular -koon < *-ko-hen (the plural -koot has -t by analogy) and passive -ttakoon < *-tta-ko-hen.

==== Non-finite forms ====
In addition, there were also several non-finite forms.

Infinitive I	*-tak (-dak) : *-ta- (-da-)
Infinitive II	*-te- (-de-)
Gerund ("Infinitive III")	*-ma
Action noun ("Infinitive IV")	*-minen : *-mice-
Present active participle	*-pa (-ba)
Present passive participle	*-ttapa (-ttaba)
Past active participle	*-nut
Past passive participle	*-ttu

==== Negative verb ====
Proto-Finnic, like its descendants, expressed negation using a special negative verb, functionally highly reminiscent of Indo-European modal auxiliaries. This verb was defective and inflected only in the indicative ("does not", "did not") and the imperative ("do not") moods. The main verb was placed in its special connegative form, and expressed the main mood. The negative verb was also suppletive, having the stem *e- in the indicative and variously *äl-, *al-, *är- in the imperative. This has been partially levelled in Votic and most of Eastern Finnic, which show an imperative stem *el-.

Imperative forms of the negative verb in Finnic
		2nd person singular	3rd person singular
(North) Estonian		ära	ärgu
Finnish	Western	älä, äläˣ	älköön, älköhön
Finnish	Eastern	elä	elköön
Karelian	Northern	elä	elkäh
Karelian	Tver	elä	elgäh
Karelian	Livvi	älä	älgäh
Ingrian	Hevaha	eläɢ	elkkään
Ingrian	Soikkola	elä	(elkää)
Ingrian	Lower Luga	elä	(elkö)
Votic	Lower Luga	elä	(elko)
Votic	Central	elä, älä	elkoo, älkoo
Votic	Eastern	eläɢ	elkoon
Veps		ala	algaha, augaha, ougaha
Livonian		alā	algõ

Past tense inflection was based on the stem *es-. This is retained as a separate category only in South Estonian and Livonian, but lost in all other Finnic languages. replaced by a construction of present tense of the negative verb, plus past active participle. The distinctive Kodavere dialect of Estonian, however, adopts this and not the present stem as the basic negative verb stem: esin "I didn't", esid "you (sg.) didn't", es "s/he didn't" etc.

Originally, the negative verb may have had participles and other moods as well. However, no clear traces of moods other than the indicative are found in any Finnic language. A remnant of what may be either a present active participle or an archaic third-person singular present form survives in the prefix *epä- "un-, not" (Finnish epä-, Estonian eba-), while a remnant of a 2nd infinitive instructive may survive in dialectal Finnish eten- "without doing".

Negation of non-finite constructions was expressed using the abessive case of the infinitives or participles.

== Later developments ==
The following is an overview of the more important changes that happened after the Proto-Finnic period.

=== Development of consonant clusters ===
These changes happened very late in the Proto-Finnic period, but as South Estonian developed somewhat differently, it shows that dialectal diversification was beginning to occur around this time.

In South Estonian, *p and *k assimilate to a following dental obstruent, while *t assimilates to *k, and *čk remains distinct from *tk.

(Pre)-Finnic	South Estonian (Võro)	Other Finnic (North Estonian, Finnish)
*čk (*kačku "plague")	*tsk (katsk)	*tk (katk, katku)
*tk (*itku "cry")	*kk (ikk)	*tk (itk, itku)
*kt (*koktu "womb")	*tt (kõtt)	stressed *ht (kõht, kohtu) unstressed *tt
*pt	*tt	stressed *ht unstressed *tt
*kc (*ükci "one")	*ts (üts')	*ks (üks, yksi)
*pc (*lapci "child")	*ts (lats')	*ps (laps, lapsi)
*ks (maksa "liver")	*ss (mass)	*ks (maks, maksa)
*ps	*ss	*ps

In all Finnic dialects, original *pt and *kt have the same reflex. It is therefore impossible to distinguish them in reconstruction, unless there is additional internal evidence (in the form of grammatical alternations) or external evidence (from non-Finnic languages).

=== Developments to the affricates *c and *cc ===
The non-geminated *c becomes *s generally: Proto-Finnic *veci "water", *cika "pig", *-inen: *-ice- (adjective suffix) > Finnish vesi, sika, -(i)nen: -(i)se-. However, occasionally ts or ds remains in South Estonian: Võro tsiga, -ne: -dse- or -se- (but vesi). The merging of *c and *s often makes it impossible to distinguish the two sounds using Finnic evidence alone, if internal reconstruction is not viable (e. g., from t ~ s alternations from assibilation).

The geminate affricate *cc generally remains, often spelled ⟨ts⟩. In Karelian, Votic and some Finnish dialects, the two grades remain distinguished (in Karelian as ⟨čč⟩: ⟨č⟩, in Ludic as ⟨cc⟩: ⟨c⟩, in Votic as ⟨tts⟩: ⟨ts⟩). In all other Finnic languages the two grades fall together (written in Veps as ⟨c⟩, as ⟨ts⟩ in the others).

In early Finnish, both grades were fronted to interdental θθ: θ, which in most dialects later changed into a variety of other dialect-specific sounds. Examples found are gradation patterns tt: t, ht: h, ht: t, ss: s or non-gradating tt or ht. In early written Finnish, the interdental fricatives are written as ⟨tz⟩ (for both grades) in the earliest records, which in Standard Finnish has led to the spelling pronunciation /ts/ (treated as a consonant cluster and hence no longer subject to consonant gradation).

=== The vowel õ ===
In the southern Finnic languages, a new back unrounded mid vowel [ɤ] develops from *e in words with back vowel harmony. For example Proto-Finnic *velka "debt" > Estonian võlg, Võro võlg, but > Finnish velka. South Estonian and Votic show this development in all syllables, so that e and õ become a front and back vowel harmony pair. This may have also occurred in the earlier history of north (Standard) Estonian, but vowel harmony was later abandoned, undoing the change if it did occur.

In South Estonian, õ in front of a nasal is raised to a central unrounded vowel [ɨ] (represented orthographically as ⟨y⟩), parallel to the development of the other mid vowels. E.g. Võro ynn', Estonian õnn "luck"; Võro ryngas, Estonian rõngas "ring".

In Estonian and Votic, more rarely Livonian, instances of õ also develop by unrounding of earlier short *o. The detailed history of this change is unclear and shows much variation even between individual dialects of (North) Estonian. The development of *o to õ is the most general in Votic (if recent loanwords from Ingrian, Finnish and Russian are discounted) and in the Kodavere dialect of Estonian. Three main groups can thus be distinguished:

Proto-Finnic	Votic	Estonian	Võro	Livonian	Finnish	Meaning	Unrounding in
*hopëda	õpõa	hõbe	hõpõ	õ'bdõ	hopea	"silver"	All Southern Finnic varieties
*kova	kõva	kõva	kõva	kõvā	kova	"hard"	All Southern Finnic varieties
*souta-	sõutaa	sõudma	sõudma	sõidõ	soutaa	"to row"	All Southern Finnic varieties
*votta-	võttaa	võtma	võtma	võttõ	ottaa	"to take"	All Southern Finnic varieties
*korva	kõrva	kõrv	kõrv	kūora	korva	"ear"	South Estonian, North Estonian and Votic
*olki	õltši	õlg	olg'	vȯļg	olki	"hay"	South Estonian, North Estonian and Votic
*pohja	põhja	põhi	põhi, põha	pū'oj	pohja	"bottom"	South Estonian, North Estonian and Votic
*sormi	sõrmi	sõrm	sõrm'	suoŗm	sormi	"finger"	South Estonian, North Estonian and Votic
*kota	kõta	koda	koda	kuodā	kota	"house"	Only in Votic and Kodavere Estonian
*oja	õja	oja	oja, uja	vȯja	oja	"ditch"	Only in Votic and Kodavere Estonian
*oksa	õhsa	oks	oss	oksā	oksa	"branch"	Only in Votic and Kodavere Estonian
*tohti-	tõhtia	tohtima	toht'ma	tū'odõ	tohtia	"to dare"	Only in Votic and Kodavere Estonian

A particularly interesting example is "to take", which suggests that at least some instances of this change preceded the general Finnic loss of word-initial *v- before rounded vowels, which affected Finnish and the rest of Northern Finnic (which kept a rounded vowel) but not Estonian and the rest of Southern Finnic (which unrounded the vowel). It therefore must have occurred very early, in dialectal Proto-Finnic times.

In a small number of words, Estonian and Votic õ can be additionally found in correspondence to North Finnic a or u. Livonian and South Estonian might align with either side, depending on the word. E.g.

- "all": Estonian kõik, Votic kõittši, Võro kyik — Finnish and Karelian kaikki, Veps kaik
- "thread": Estonian lõng, Votic lõnka — Finnish and Karelian lanka, Veps and South Estonian lang, Livonian lānga
- "or": Estonian and Livonian või — Finnish, Karelian, Veps and Võro vai (Votic vai, possibly from Ingrian)
- "word": Estonian and Votic sõna, Livonian sõnā, Võro syna — Finnish, Karelian and Veps sana
- Estonian and Võro mõistma, Votic mõissaa "to understand" — Finnish and Karelian muistaa, Veps muštta "to remember"
- "heath": Estonian nõmm, Votic nõmmi — Finnish nummi

=== Vowel reduction and loss ===
Short final vowels are lost after long syllables (two consonants or a syllable with a long vowel or diphthong) in Veps, partly Ludian, both North and South Estonian, and most Southwestern dialects of Finnish. For example, Proto-Finnic *kakci "two", *neljä "four", *viici "five" > Estonian kaks, neli, viis, Veps kaks', nel'l', viž, Võro katś, nelli, viiś, but > standard Finnish kaksi, neljä, viisi. This change occurred before the loss of final consonants (if any), as vowels that were originally followed by a consonant were not lost. The loss of final *-i leaves phonemic palatalization of the preceding consonant in many languages, on which see below.

Colloquial Finnish loses word-final i under more limited conditions, in particular after s (e.g. kaks "two", viis "5"; inflectional endings such as aamuks "for/to the morning" (translative), talos "your house" (2nd person singular possessive), tulis "would come" (3rd person singular conditional)) as well as word-final a/ä from several inflectional endings (e.g. inessive -s(s), elative -st, adessive -l(l), ablative -lt).

Ingrian also has word-final i-reduction, sometimes obligatory, but more often optional. Thus, *kakci > kaks, *viici > viis, but *suuri > suur, suuri, *peeni > peeni, peen, *keeli > keeli, keel. In the Soikkola, Hevaha and Ylä-Laukaa dialects of Ingrian, the word-final a/ä in inflectional endings often reduce as well (e.g. inessive -s, elative -st, adessive -l, ablative -lt), and a short vowel preceding these endings, unless directly following a short stressed syllable, is elongated. Moreover, the Ala-Laukaa dialect of Ingrian developed a more complex system of vowel reduction in any unstressed syllable unless immediately following a short stressed syllable.

In Livonian, all short final vowels except *a and *ä are lost, thus giving *kakci > kakš as in Estonian, but also *veci "water" > ve'ž, while no vowel was lost in *neljä > nēļa, *kala "fish" > kalā.

Unstressed *o merges into *u in Northern Estonian.

Vowel harmony is lost in Estonian, Livonian and partly Veps, but not South Estonian or Votic. For example, Proto-Finnic *külä "village" > Estonian küla and Livonian kilā, but > Finnish kylä, Veps külä, Votic tšülä, Võro külä. In Finnish and Karelian, vowel harmony was retained and extended to *o as well, creating a new vowel *ö in words with front vowel harmony.

Many languages in the Southern Finnic group, as well as again Veps and Southwestern Finnish, show loss of unstressed vowels in medial syllables. In these languages, vowel length is lost before h early on, while diphthongs are simplified into short vowels.

=== Palatalization ===
Palatalized consonants are reintroduced into most varieties other than Western Finnish. The most widespread source is regressive palatalization due to a lost word-final or word-medial *-i (a form of cheshirization), and consonant clusters with *j as a second member. In several varieties, there is also progressive palatalization, where a diphthong ending in *-i and the long vowel *ii causes palatalization of a following consonant.

- In Livonian, the palatalized *ś and *ź that arose from loss of *-i generally shift to postalveolar š and ž.
- In Votic, *k and *g are palatalized to tš and j before all front vowels.
- Veps undergoes both regressive and progressive palatalization, but with different outcomes:
  1. Progressive palatalization of post-Proto-Finnic *s yields postalveolar š or ž. For example, Proto-Finnic *viici "five" > *viisi > Veps viž.
  2. Regressive palatalization of post-Proto-Finnic *s yields alveolo-palatal ś or ź. For example, Proto-Finnic *kuuci "six" > *kuusi > Veps kuź.
- In Northern Karelian, a general shift *s > š occurs, except blocked in progressive palatalization contexts.

Estonian, Votic and Finnish do not have general palatalization, and š occurs almost solely in loanwords, most commonly of Russian or German origin. Estonian has positional and phonemic palatalization of medial and final alveolars (except /r/), realized usually as pre-palatalized.

=== Loss of final consonants ===
Final *-k was generally lost. It is preserved in some dialects:

- In Eastern Votic as -g
- In Võro as -q (a glottal stop /ʔ/)
- In the now extinct Hevaha dialect of Ingrian as -k when following -tV- or -tsV-.

Final *-h is widely lost as well. It is preserved:

- In Karelian and Veps as -h.
- In Southern Estonian as either -h or as a glottal stop -q.
- In the now extinct Hevaha and Ylä-Laukaa dialects of Ingrian as -h

Traces of both *-k and *-h remain in Finnish, where the consonants became a sandhi effect, assimilating to the initial consonant of the following word and lengthening it. This effect does not occur in all dialects and is not represented orthographically, but is often noted with a superscript "ˣ" in reference works. In Western dialects there was also metathesis of *h, which preserved the original *h along with sandhi lengthening, e.g. Proto-Finnic *mureh "sorrow" > Western Finnish murheˣ (Karelian mureh, Võro murõh/murõq) and Proto-Finnic *veneh "boat" > Western Finnish venheˣ (Karelian/Veps veneh, Võro vineh/vineq). Standard Finnish inconsistently adopts some words in their Western Finnish shape (e.g. murhe; perhe "family", valhe "lie"), some in their Eastern Finnish shape (e.g. vene; huone "room").

Final *-n is lost in most of the South Finnic area (as well as widely in modern-day colloquial Finnish). In Votic this triggers compensatory lengthening of the preceding vowel. The 1st person verbal ending resists the change, and generally remains as -n.

Loss of final consonants followed the loss of final vowels. Thus, vowels followed by a lost consonant were preserved.

=== Loss of voiced obstruents ===
The voiced obstruents *b/β, *d/δ and *g/γ that occurred as the weak grades of single plosives were often lost or modified in various ways. The simplest outcomes are in the marginal languages Livonian, Ludic and Veps, where all three are reflected as plain voiced stops b, d and g respectively regardless of environment. The remaining languages show more complex developments.

*b/β develops relatively uniformly:

- The fricative *β merges with *v.
- The nasal-plosive cluster *mb assimilates to mm, except in Olonets Karelian (Livvi).

The development of *d/δ is more diverse:

- The clusters *lδ and *rδ are widely assimilated to geminated *ll and *rr, creating the characteristic gradation patterns lt ~ ll and rt ~ rr.
- In other positions, *δ is lost early on in the other languages of the Eastern Finnic group (Eastern Finnish, Karelian and Ingrian) as well as in Estonian. After long vowels, this frequently resulted in hiatus resolution, often by inserting a glide -(i)j- or -(v)v-.
- In Western Finnish, *δ is lost after an unstressed syllable, but remains after a stressed syllable. It remained initially as /ð/, but shifted to /ɾ/ or /r/ in Ostrobothnian and to /l/ in Tavastian. In Standard Finnish, the sound was written ⟨d⟩ or ⟨dh⟩ early on, and pronunciation has now become /d/ through spelling pronunciation. Individual words may follow particular dialects instead, e.g. zero in *naudetta > navetta "cowshed", l in *tadikkoi > talikko "manure fork".
- The nasal-plosive cluster *nd assimilates to nn, except in Olonets Karelian.

*g/γ develops somewhat similar to *d/δ, but with several conditional outcomes:

- In Votic, *γ is fortified to /ɡ/ when not palatalized (see above).
- In Karelian, the clusters *lγ and *rγ become geminated *ll and *rr, like the clusters *lδ and *rδ.
- In Western Finnish, *lγ and *rγ become *lj and *rj when followed by an unrounded front vowel (*i, *e, and often *ä), although there is wide variation and there are exceptions for each vowel. There are also many words in which the cluster *hk develops into *hγ analogically, which then likewise develops into *hj, although again with numerous exceptions.
- Between two labial vowels, *γ becomes *v in Western Finnish.
- In all remaining languages and positions, *γ is lost.
- The nasal-plosive cluster *ŋg is assimilated to the corresponding geminate ng /ŋː/ in several of the Finnish dialects. However, given the lack of a pre-existing *ŋ, the cluster widely "un-gradates" back to *ŋk. In Lower Luga Ingrian, this cluster remained a voiced /ŋɡ/ (as opposed to the voiceless nk /ŋk/).

The loss of consonants often created new long vowels and diphthongs, particularly in non-initial syllables. Compare for example:

- Finnish auttaa "to help" < Proto-Finnic *abuttadak with the unmodified strong grade in apu "help, assistance".
- North and South Estonian susi "wolf", genitive soe < Proto-Finnic *suci, *suδen.
- Tver Karelian käzi "hand", genitive kiän < Proto-Finnic *käci, käδen.

=== Lenition ===
In all Finnic languages except Finnish, Northern Karelian, the Ala-Laukaa dialect of Ingrian and Votic (partially), the voiceless (strong grade) obstruent consonants *p, *t, *k and *s, are lenited to voiced or lax voiceless obstruents b, d, g, z when occurring between voiced sounds. In Veps and Livonian, these new voiced plosives merge with their weak grade counterparts. In Estonian s remains voiceless and b, d, g are not fully voiced, instead remaining as lax voiceless consonants [b̥], [d̥], [ɡ̊].

=== Raising or diphthongization of long vowels ===
In many Finnic languages, long vowels develop into opening diphthongs by raising the onset, or show general raising instead.

The long mid vowels *oo, *öö and *ee become opening diphthongs /uo̯/, /yø̯/, /ie̯/ in Finnish, Karelian, Lower Luga Ingrian and several marginal dialects of Northern Estonian. In Western Finnish dialects their second component widely becomes more open, producing /uɔ̯/, /yœ̯/, /iɛ̯/ or even /uɑ̯/, /yæ̯/ and either /iæ̯/ or /iɑ̯/ depending on vowel harmony. Diphthongization also occurs in Livonian, but only under certain conditions, and the mid back unrounded long vowel õõ is not affected. In Livonian, the short vowels *o and *e may also diphthongize, leading to a contrast of short uo, ie /wo/, /je/ with long ūo, īe /uːo̯/, /iːe̯/.

In many Ingrian dialects, ee, oo and öö merge with ii /iː/, uu /uː/ and yy /yː/.

In South Estonian, raising only occurs in overlong syllables, and results in long close vowels uu, üü and ii.

In Eastern Finnish and Karelian, the low vowels *aa and *ää also diphthongize, becoming Karelian ua, yä/iä (in some dialects, oa, öä/eä), Savonian ua, iä. In standard Livonian, long *aa of any origin is at a late date generally raised to ǭ /ɔː/.

=== Diphthong assimilation ===
The diphthong *eü is fully labialized to öü in Northern Finnic and South Estonian. In northern dialects of Veps, new long close vowels are created by the raising of several diphthongs:

- *ei, *öi > ii.
- *iu, *iü, *eu, *öü > üü ~ üu.
- *au, *ou > uu.

North Estonian instead unrounds all diphthongs ending in -ü to -i:

- *eü > ei
- *äü > äi

In Savonian Finnish, the second element of all diphthongs is lowered:

- *au, *äü > ao, äö or further > aa, ää
- *ai, *äi > ae, äe
- *oi, *öi > oe, öe

In Livonian, *au is labialized to ou, and *äi is palatalized to ei. Following this, the mid diphthongs are smoothed to long vowels under certain conditions:

- ou > oo
- õi, õu > õõ
- ei > ee

=== Coda vocalization ===
A variety of languages shows a change of a syllable-final consonant into a vowel. This is not one single change, but several independent developments.

In the Southern Finnic group, *n is lost before *s (< Proto-Finnic *s or *c), with compensatory lengthening of the preceding vowel. For example Proto-Finnic *kanci "lid", *pensas "bush" > Estonian kaas, põõsas, but > Finnish kansi, pensas.

In Western Finnish, stop consonants before a sonorant are vocalized to u. E.g. *kapris "goat", *atra "plough", *kakra "oats" > Finnish kauris, aura, kaura, but > Estonian kaber, ader, kaer, Karelian kapris, atra, kakra. Standard Finnish mostly follows the Western Finnish model. Some notable exceptions include kekri "All Saints' Eve feast", kupla "bubble".

Syllable-final *l is vocalized in Veps at a late date, creating u-final diphthongs in the northern and central dialects, long vowels in the southern.

== See also ==
- Etymological Dictionary of the Finnish Language
