= Arto =

Arto may refer to:

== People ==
=== In the arts ===
- Arto Halonen (born 1964), Finnish documentary filmmaker
- Arto Järvelä (born 1964), Finnish fiddler and composer
- Arto Lindsay (born 1953), American musician Arthur Lindsay
- Arto Noras (born 1942), Finnish cellist
- Arto Paasilinna (1942–2018), Finnish writer and journalist
- Arto Saari (born 1981), Finnish professional skateboarder and photographer
- Arto Tchakmaktchian (1933–2019), Canadian-Armenian sculptor and painter
- Arto Tunçboyacıyan (born 1957), Turkish-born avant-garde folk musician

=== In politics ===
- Arto Aas (born 1980), Estonian politician
- Arto Pirttilahti (born 1963), Finnish politician
- Arto Satonen (born 1966), Finnish politician

=== In sport ===
- Arto Härkönen (born 1959), Finnish Olympic champion javelin thrower
- Arto Heiskanen (born 1963), Finnish former ice hockey player
- Arto Koivisto (born 1948), Finnish former cross-country skier
- Arto Koivisto (basketball) (1930–2016), Finnish basketball player
- Arto Lilja (born 1973), Finnish ski-orienteering competitor
- Arto Ruotanen (born 1961), Finnish retired ice hockey player
- Arto Saari (born 1981), Finnish professional skateboarder and photographer
- Arto Tolsa (1945–1989), Finnish footballer

=== In other fields ===
- Arto Räty (born 1955), Finnish retired lieutenant general
- Arto Salomaa (1934–2025), Finnish mathematician and computer scientist

== Places ==
- Artò, a frazione (and parish) of the municipality of Madonna del Sasso, Piedmont, Italy
- Arto, Sevnica, a settlement in the municipality of Sevnica in Slovenia
- Arto, Spain, a village

== Music ==
- Arto Records, a 1920s record label
- "Arto" (song), a hidden track on the System of a Down album Toxicity
