= Akonpohja =

Village in South Karelia, Finland

- Village
- Interactive map of Akonpohja
- Coordinates: 61°41.761′N 29°41.096′E
- Country: Finland
- Region: South Karelia
- Sub-region: Imatra sub-region
- Municipality: Parikkala

Area
  - Total: 1.38 km^{2} (0.53 sq mi)

Population (31 December 2023)
  - Total: 206
  - Density: 1,493/km^{2} (3,870/sq mi)
- Postal code: 59510

Akonpohja (Finnish pronunciation: [ˈɑkonˌpohjɑ]) is a village in the municipality of Parikkala in the region of South Karelia, Finland. Before 2005, the village was the administrative center of the former Saari municipality. At the end of 2023, the village had over 200 residents.

Akonpohja is located approximately 20 kilometres (12 mi) from the municipal centre of Parikkala at the intersection of Highway 6. Saari railway station is located approximately 1 kilometre (0.62 mi) from the village.
