= Aleksanteri Aava =

Finnish poet

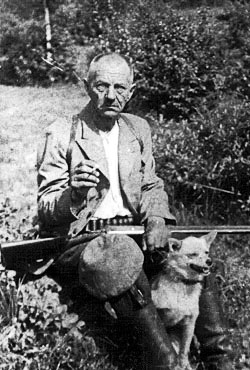
Aleksanteri Aava in 1947.

Aleksanteri Aava, born Aleksanteri (Santeri) Kuparinen, (18 April 1883 – 11 March 1956) was a Finnish poet and smallholder.

Aava was born in Sakkola in the Grand Duchy of Finland. His parents were Matti Juhonpoika Kuparinen, a farmer and a tanner, and Emilia Martintytär Karvanen (or Karvonen). He attended elementary school and graduated on 1901 in folk high school of Uusikirkko. Aava then worked as a smallholder in Sakkola until 1939 and was also a member of the Sakkola Town Council. Aava had been married to Helena Riikonen since 1911 and they had seven children: Kauko, Arvo, Aune Emilia, Kerttu, Jouko, Toivo Santeri and Vuokko Sisko. After the Winter War, Aava's family evacuated to the village of Mikkolanniemi, Saari, South Karelia, where Aava then spent his last years of life; his eldest sons, Kauko and Arvo, died in the Continuation War between 1941 and 1944.

Aleksanteri Aava received the State Prize for his poem collection, Musta lintu (literally translated "black bird"), published in 1917. The bust of Aava by Otto Pursiainen was erected in 1961 in Lempäälä.

== Sources ==
- Runoilija Aleksanteri Aava (1883–1956) (in Finnish)
