= Jukka Juusti =

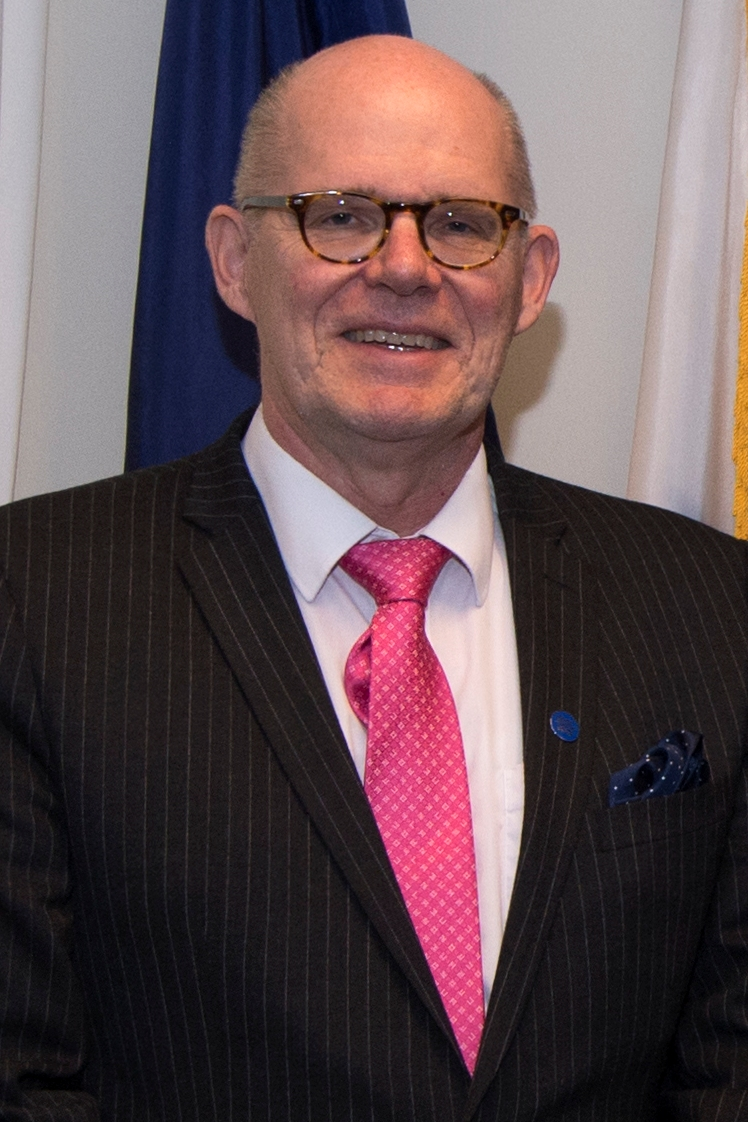
Jukka Juusti in 2017

Jukka Matti Juusti (born 16 May 1955) is a Finnish Engineer Major General (special officer), retired, and he holds a Master of Science degree in technology. When appointed as Permanent Secretary of the Ministry of Defence as of 1 January 2016, he followed Arto Räty in this post. Prior to the appointment, he acted as the Director of the Resource Policy Department in 2012–2015.

Juusti was born in Oulu. He took his matriculation examination at the upper secondary school of Riihimäki in 1974 and went on to study at Helsinki University of Technology where, in 1979, he completed his master's degree in the department of electrical engineering. He also completed the master's degree in Defence Administration in Great Britain in 1989. Jukka Juusti has a long career in the defence administration and he has also held various international positions. His career in the defence administration includes the positions as Deputy Chief of Staff, Logistics and Armaments (2011-2012); Chief Engineer of the Finnish Defence Forces (2006); and Chief of Armaments of the Finnish Defence Forces. He has also worked as a defence adviser at the Mission of Finland to Nato in Brussels from 1999 to 2003 and as Armaments Director in the European Defence Agency from 2008 to 2010.

There was a political debate on the proposal to appoint Juusti as Permanent Secretary; this also raised a lot of public discussion as the National Coalition Party and a number of experts wished that Arto Räty would continue in the position. The then Minister of Finance Alexander Stubb (National Coalition Party) requested referral of the matter. According to expert public servants, both generals were equally qualified for the task. The Government made a decision in line with the proposal of Minister of Defence Jussi Niinistö (True Finns) and Juusti was appointed. According to Niinistö, Juusti combines military and civilian competences, technical expertise and financial skills.
