= Consonant mutation =

Sound change happening in linguistics

Consonant mutation is change in a consonant in a word according to its morphological or syntactic environment.

Mutation occurs in languages around the world. A prototypical example of consonant mutation is the initial consonant mutation of all modern Celtic languages. Initial consonant mutation is also found in Indonesian or Malay, in Nivkh, in Southern Paiute and in several West African languages such as Fula. The Nilotic language Dholuo, spoken in Kenya, shows mutation of stem-final consonants, as does English to a small extent. Mutation of initial, medial and final consonants is found in Modern Hebrew. Also, Japanese exhibits word medial consonant mutation involving voicing, rendaku, in many compounds. Uralic languages like Finnish show consonant gradation, a type of consonant mutation.

== Similar sound changes ==
Initial consonant mutation must not be confused with sandhi, which can refer to word-initial alternations triggered by their phonological environment, unlike mutations, which are triggered by their morphosyntactic environment. Some examples of word-initial sandhi are listed below.

- Spanish: [b, d, ɡ], occurring after nasals and pause, alternate with [β, ð, ɣ], occurring after vowels and liquid consonants. Example: un [b]arco 'a boat', mi [β]arco 'my boat'. This also occurs in Hebrew (as begedkefet, an acronym for the consonants this affects), Aramaic, and Tamil.
- Scottish Gaelic: in some dialects, stops in stressed syllables are voiced after nasals, e.g. cat [kʰaht] 'a cat', an cat [əŋ ɡaht] 'the cat'.

Sandhi effects like these (or other phonological processes) are usually the historical origin of morphosyntactically triggered mutation. For example, English fricative mutation (specifically, voicing) in words such as house [haus], plural houses [hauzɪz], and the verb to house [hauz] originates in an allophonic alternation of Old English, where a voiced fricative occurred between vowels (or before voiced consonants), and a voiceless one occurred initially or finally, and also when adjacent to voiceless consonants. Old English infinitives ended in -(i)an and plural nouns (of Class One nouns) ended in -as. Thus, hūs 'a house' had [s], and hūsian 'house (verb)' had [z]; however, the plural of hūs was hūs, being a neuter noun of the strong a-stem class. During the Middle English period, hous~hus, as part of the loss of gender and erosion of endings, developed plural variation, retaining hous [hu:s], the dative plural housen [hu:zən], which became extended to a general plural, and over time taking on the es plural from Old English Class 1 nouns, thus houses [hu:zəz]. After most endings were lost in English, and the contrast between voiced and voiceless fricatives partly phonemicized (largely due to the influx of French loanwords), the alternation was morphologized.

== Examples ==
=== English ===
In Old English, velar stops were palatalized in certain cases but not others. That resulted in some alternations, many of which have been levelled, but traces occur in some word doublets such as ditch /dɪtʃ/ and dike /daɪk/.

In the past tense of certain verbs, English also retains traces of several ancient sound developments such as *kt > *xt and *ŋx > *x; many of them have been further complicated by the loss of /x/ in Middle English.

- seek /siːk/ : sought /sɔːt/
- think /θɪŋk/ : thought /θɔːt/

The pair teach /tiːt͡ʃ/ : taught /tɔːt/ has a combination of both this and palatalization.

A second palatalization, called yod-coalescence, occurs in loanwords from Latin. One subtype affects the sibilant consonants: earlier /sj/ and /zj/ were palatalized, leading to an alternation between alveolar /s z/ and postalveolar /ʃ ʒ/.

- confess /kənˈfɛs/ : confession /kənˈfɛʃən/
- fuse /fjuːz/ : fusion /ˈfjuːʒən/

Another unproductive layer results from the Vulgar Latin palatalization of velar stops before front vowels. It is thus imported from the Romance languages, and /k ɡ/ alternate with /s dʒ/.

- induce /ɪnˈdjuːs/ : induction /inˈdʌkʃən/
- magic /ˈmædʒɪk/ : magus /meɪɡəs/

A combination of inherited and loaned alternation also occurs: an alternation pattern *t : *sj was brought over in Latinate loanwords, which in English was then turned into an alternation between /t/ and /ʃ/.

- act /ækt/ : action /ˈækʃən/

=== Celtic languages ===
The Insular Celtic languages are well-known for their initial consonant mutations. The individual languages vary on the number of mutations available: Scottish Gaelic has one, Irish and Manx have two, Welsh, Cornish and Breton have four (if mixed mutations are counted). Cornish and Breton have so-called mixed mutations; a trigger causes one mutation to some sounds and another to other sounds. Welsh also has a mixed mutation (triggered by na, ni and oni). The languages vary on the environments for the mutations, but some generalizations can be made. Those languages all have feminine singular nouns mutated after the definite article, with adjectives mutated after feminine singular nouns. In most of the languages, the possessive determiners trigger various mutations. Here are some examples from Breton, Cornish, Irish, Scottish Gaelic, and Welsh:

Breton	Cornish	Welsh	Irish	Scottish Gaelic	Gloss
gwreg	gwreg	gwraig	bean	bean	'woman'/'wife'
bras	bras	mawr	mór	mòr	'big'
ar wreg vras	an wreg vras	y wraig fawr	an bhean mhór	a' bhean mhòr	'the big woman'
kazh	kath	cath	cat	cat	'cat'
e gazh	y gath	ei gath	a chat	a chat	'his cat'
he c'hazh	hy hath	ei chath	a cat	a cat	'her cat'
o c'hazh	aga hath	eu cath	a gcat	an cat	'their cat'

Older textbooks on Gaelic sometimes refer to the c → ch mutation as "aspiration", but it is not aspiration in the sense of the word used by modern phoneticians, and linguists prefer to speak of lenition here.

Historically, the Celtic initial mutations originated from progressive assimilation and sandhi phenomena between adjacent words. For example, the mutating effect of the conjunction a 'and' is from the word once having the form *ak, and the final consonant influenced the following sounds.

==== Welsh ====
Welsh has three main classes of initial consonant mutation: soft mutation (Welsh: treiglad meddal); nasal mutation (Welsh: treiglad trwynol); and aspirate mutation, which is sometimes called spirant mutation (Welsh: treiglad llaes). The fourth category is mixed mutation, which calls for an aspirate mutation if possible but otherwise a soft mutation. The following tables show the range of Welsh mutations with examples. A blank cell indicates that no change occurs.

Mutation scheme				Examples				
Radical	Soft	Nasal	Aspirate	Radical	Soft	Nasal	Aspirate	English
p	b	mh /m̥/	ph /f/	plant /plant/	blant /blant/	mhlant /m̥lant/	phlant /flant/	'children'
t	d	nh /n̥/	th /θ/	tref /treː(v)/	dref /dreː(v)/	nhref /n̥reː(v)/	thref /θreː(v)/	'town'
t	d	nh /n̥/	th /θ/	tŷ /tiː/	dŷ /diː/	nhŷ /n̥iː/	thŷ /θiː/	'house'
c /k/	g	ngh /ŋ̊/	ch /χ/	coeden /kɔi̯dɛn/	goeden /ɡɔi̯dɛn/	nghoeden /ŋ̊ɔi̯dɛn/	choeden /χɔi̯dɛn/	'tree'
b	f /v/	m		brawd /braʊ̯d/	frawd /vraʊ̯d/	mrawd /mraʊ̯d/		'brother'
d	dd /ð/	n		dŵr /duːr/	ddŵr /ðuːr/	nŵr /nuːr/		'water'
g	∅*	ng /ŋ/		gwaith /ɡwai̯θ/	waith /wai̯θ/ by	ngwaith /ŋwai̯θ/		'work'
g	∅*	ng /ŋ/		glas /ɡlas/	las /las/	nglas /ŋlas/		'blue'
g	∅*	ng /ŋ/		gorsaf /ɡɔrsa(v)/	orsaf /ɔrsa(v)/	ngorsaf /ŋɔrsa(v)/		'station'
m	f /v/			mawr /maʊ̯r/	fawr /vaʊ̯r/			'big, large'
ll /ɬ/	l			llan /ɬan/	lan /lan/			'parish'
rh /r̥/	r			rhywbeth /r̥ɪʊ̯bɛθ/	rywbeth /rɪʊ̯bɛθ/			'something'
ts /t͡ʃ/	j /d͡ʒ/			tsips /t͡ʃɪps/	jips /d͡ʒɪps/			'chips' (colloquial)

* Soft mutation causes initial /ɡ/ to be deleted. For example, gardd 'garden' becomes yr ardd 'the garden', and gwaith 'work' becomes ei waith 'his work'.

The mutation ts → j corresponds to the t → d mutation and reflects a change heard in modern words borrowed from English. Borrowed words like tsips/jips (chips) can often be heard in Wales. Dw i'n mynd i gael tsips 'I'm going to get (some) chips'; Mae gen i jips 'I have chips'. However, the ts → j mutation is not usually included the classic list of Welsh mutations and is rarely taught in formal classes. Nevertheless, it is a part of the colloquial language and is used by native speakers.

Initial consonant mutation is often used to indicate grammatical gender of nouns in Welsh, but only in singular words. For example, y dyn 'the man' vs. y ddynes 'the woman'; y bachgen mawr 'the big boy' vs. y ferch fawr 'the big girl'. With plural words there are no mutations: y bechgyn mawr 'the big boys', y merched mawr 'the big girls'.

Mutation can also distinguish the possessive pronouns "his" and "her", e.g. ei dad (soft mutation) 'his father' vs. ei thad (aspirate mutation) 'her father'. Again when the pronoun is plural there is no mutation: eu tad 'their (m. or f.) father'.

Mutation of consonants is found not only at the beginning of words but also internally in compounds, affecting not only the beginning of the second element but also sometimes the end of the first element, e.g. cofio 'remember', anghofio 'forget'; cymuned "community", cyfoes 'contemporary'.

===== h-prothesis =====
h-prothesis is a feature in Welsh in which a vowel-initial word becomes h-initial. It occurs after the possessive pronouns ei 'her', ein 'our', and eu 'their': oedran 'age', ei hoedran 'her age' (cf. ei oedran 'his age'). It also occurs with ugain 'twenty' after ar 'on' in the traditional counting system: un ar hugain 'twenty-one', literally 'one on twenty'.

==== Irish ====
Irish has two consonant mutations: lenition (Irish: séimhiú [ˈʃeːvʲuː]) and eclipsis (urú [ˈʊɾˠuː]).

===== Lenition =====
Lenition (séimhiú) is indicated by an ⟨h⟩ following the consonant in question or, in some older typefaces and texts, by an overdot (⟨◌̇⟩) above the letter that has undergone lenition. The effects of lenition are as follows:

1. A stop becomes a fricative. Voicing is retained, as is place of articulation except for the coronals.
  - /pˠ/ → /fˠ/
  - /pʲ/ → /fʲ/
  - /t̪ˠ/ → /h/
  - /tʲ/ → /h/
  - /k/ → /x/
  - /c/ → /ç/
  - /bˠ/ → /w/, /v/
  - /bʲ/ → /vʲ/
  - /d̪ˠ/ → /ɣ/
  - /dʲ/ → /j/
  - /ɡ/ → /ɣ/
  - /ɟ/ → /j/
  - /mˠ/ → /w/
  - /mʲ/ → /vʲ/
2. /sˠ/ and /ʃ/ become /h/, but /sˠp(ʲ)/, /sˠm(ʲ)/, /sˠt̪ˠ/, /ʃtʲ/, /sˠk/, and /ʃc/ do not mutate.
3. /fˠ/ and /fʲ/ are deleted.

Examples
Unmutated	Lenition	Gloss
peann /pʲaːn̪ˠ/	pheann /fʲaːn̪ˠ/	'pen'
teach /tʲax/	theach /hax/	'house'
ceann /caːn̪ˠ/	cheann /çaːn̪ˠ/	'head'
bean /bʲanˠ/	bhean /vʲanˠ/	'woman'
droim /d̪ˠɾˠiːmʲ/	dhroim /ɣɾˠiːmʲ/	'back'
glúin /ɡl̪ˠuːnʲ/	ghlúin /ɣl̪ˠuːnʲ/	'knee'
máthair /mˠaːhəɾʲ/	mháthair /waːhəɾʲ/	'mother'
súil /sˠuːlʲ/	shúil /huːlʲ/	'eye'
freagra /fʲɾʲaɡɾˠə/	fhreagra /ɾʲaɡɾˠə/	'answer'

===== Eclipsis =====
The following tables show how eclipsis affects the start of words. Eclipsis is represented in the orthography by adding a letter, or occasionally two letters, to the start of the word. If the word is to be capitalised, the original first letter is capitalised, not the letter or letters added for eclipsis, e.g. the ⟨bhF⟩ in Amhrán na bhFiann, Ireland's national anthem.

Sound change	Unmutated	Eclipsis	Gloss	Notes
/pˠ/ → /bˠ/	práta /pˠɾˠaːt̪ˠə/	bpráta /bˠɾˠaːt̪ˠə/	'potato'	A voiceless stop or /fˠ, fʲ/ is voiced.
/pʲ/ → /bʲ/	peann /pʲaːnˠ/	bpeann /bʲaːnˠ/	'pen'	A voiceless stop or /fˠ, fʲ/ is voiced.
/t̪ˠ/ → /d̪ˠ/	tráta /t̪ˠɾˠaːt̪ˠə/	dtráta /d̪ˠɾˠaːt̪ˠə/	'tomato'	A voiceless stop or /fˠ, fʲ/ is voiced.
/tʲ/ → /dʲ/	teanga /tʲaŋ(ɡ)ə/	dteanga /dʲaŋ(ɡ)ə/	'tongue'	A voiceless stop or /fˠ, fʲ/ is voiced.
/k/ → /ɡ/	cat /kat̪ˠ/	gcat /gat̪ˠ/	'cat'	A voiceless stop or /fˠ, fʲ/ is voiced.
/c/ → /ɟ/	ceann /caːn̪ˠ/	gceann /ɟaːn̪ˠ/	'head'	A voiceless stop or /fˠ, fʲ/ is voiced.
/fˠ/ → /w/	focal /fˠɔkəlˠ/	bhfocal /wɔkəlˠ/	'word'	A voiceless stop or /fˠ, fʲ/ is voiced.
/fʲ/ → /vʲ/	freagra /fʲɾʲaɡɾˠə/	bhfreagra /vʲɾʲaɡɾˠə/	'answer'	A voiceless stop or /fˠ, fʲ/ is voiced.
/bˠ/ → /mˠ/	bainne /bˠan̠ʲə/	mbainne /mˠan̠ʲə/	'milk"	A voiced stop becomes a nasal.
/bʲ/ → /mʲ/	bean /bʲanˠ/	mbean /mʲanˠ/	'woman'	A voiced stop becomes a nasal.
/d̪ˠ/ → /n̪ˠ/	droim /d̪ˠɾˠiːmʲ/	ndroim /n̪ˠɾˠiːmʲ/	'back'	A voiced stop becomes a nasal.
/dʲ/ → /n̠ʲ/	dinnéar /dʲɪn̠ʲeːɾˠ/	ndinnéar /n̠ʲɪn̠ʲeːɾˠ/	'dinner'	A voiced stop becomes a nasal.
/ɡ/ → /ŋ/	glúin /ɡɫ̪uːnʲ/	nglúin /ŋɫ̪uːnʲ/	'knee'	A voiced stop becomes a nasal.
/ɟ/ → /ɲ/	geata /ɟat̪ˠə/	ngeata /ɲat̪ˠə/	'gate'	A voiced stop becomes a nasal.
/eː/ → /n̠ʲeː/	éan /eːnˠ/	n-éan /n̠ʲeːnˠ/	'bird'	A vowel receives a preceding /n̪ˠ/ (before ⟨a, o, u⟩), or /n̠ʲ/ (before ⟨e, i⟩).
/iː/ → /n̪ˠiː/	oíche /iːçə/	n-oíche /n̪ˠiːçə/	'night'	A vowel receives a preceding /n̪ˠ/ (before ⟨a, o, u⟩), or /n̠ʲ/ (before ⟨e, i⟩).

=== Russian ===
In Russian, consonant mutation and alternations are a very common phenomenon during word formation, conjugation and in comparative adjectives.

The most common classes of mutations are the alternation between velar and postalveolar consonants:

- к /k/ → ч /tɕ/
- г /ɡ/ → ж /ʐ/
- х /x/ → ш /ʂ/, as in тихий "quiet" and тише "quieter"
- Gain or loss of palatalization: царь "tsar" and царский "of the tsar" (adjective)

Other common mutations are:

- т /t/ → ч /tɕ/ (or less frequently щ /ɕː/), д /d/ → ж /ʐ/
- з /z/ → ж /ʐ/, с /s/ → ш /ʂ/, ц /ts/ → ч /tɕ/
- ск /sk/ → щ /ɕː/: плеск → плещет "splash" / "(he) splashes", ст /st/ → щ /ɕː/: свистеть → свищу "to whistle" / "I whistle"

=== Hebrew ===
Modern Hebrew shows a limited set of mutation alternations, involving spirantization only. The consonants affected may be stem-initial, stem-medial, or stem-final.

Radical	Spirantized
p	f
k	x
b	v

These alternations occur in verbs:
• בּוֹא ← תָּבוֹא	/bo/ → /taˈvo/	("come" (imperative) → "you will come"),
• שָׁבַר ← נִשׁבַּר	/ʃaˈvaʁ/ → /niʃˈbaʁ/	("broke" (transitive) → "broke" (intransitive),
• כָּתַב ← יִכְתֹּב	/kaˈtav/ → /jiχˈtov/	("he wrote" → "he will write"),
• זָכַר ← יִזְכֹּר	/zaˈχaʁ/ → /jizˈkoʁ/	("he remembered" → "he will remember"),
• פָּנִית ← לִפְנוֹת	/paˈnit/ → /lifˈnot/	("you (f.) turned" → "to turn"),
• שָׁפַטְתְּ ← לִשְׁפֹּט	/ʃaˈfatet/ → /liʃˈpot/	("you (f.) judged" → "to judge "),
or in nouns:
• ערב ← ערביים	/ˈeʁev/ → /aʁˈbajim/	("evening" → "twilight"),
• מלך ← מלכה	/ˈmeleχ/ → /malˈka/	("king" → "queen"),
• אלף ← אלפית	/ˈelef/ → /alˈpit/	("a thousand" → "a thousandth"),

However, in Modern Hebrew, stop and fricative variants of ב, כ and פ are sometimes distinct phonemes:

• אִפֵּר – עִפֵר	/iˈpeʁ/ – /iˈfeʁ/	("applied make up" – "tipped ash"),
• פִּסְפֵּס – פִסְפֵס	/pisˈpes/ – /fisˈfes/	("striped" – "missed"),
• הִתְחַבֵּר – הִתְחַבֵר	/hitχaˈbeʁ/ – /hitχaˈveʁ/	("connected" – "made friends (with)"),
• הִשְׁתַּבֵּץ – הִשְׁתַּבֵץ	/hiʃtaˈbets/ – /hiʃtaˈvets/	("got integrated" – "was shocked"),

For a more in depth discussion of this phenomenon, see Begadkefat.

=== Japanese ===
Rendaku, meaning "sequential voicing", is a mutation of the initial consonant of a non-initial component in a Japanese compound word:

- nigiri + sushi → nigirizushi ("grip (with the hand)" + "sushi" → "hand-shaped sushi")
- nigori + sake → nigorizake ("muddy" + "rice wine" → "unfiltered sake")

=== Uralic languages ===
Word-medial consonant mutation is found in several Uralic languages and has the traditional name of consonant gradation. It is pervasive, especially in the Samic and Finnic branches.

==== Finnish ====
Consonant gradation involves an alternation in consonants between a strong grade in some forms of a word and a weak grade in others. The consonants subject to gradation are the plosives (p, t, k) that are followed by a vowel and preceded by a vowel, a sonorant (m, n, l, r), or h. The strong grade usually appears in an open syllable or before a long vowel.

Strong	Weak	Example	Notes
pp	p	pappi → papit; lamppu → lamput	Long consonants become short.
tt	t	katto → katot; kortti → kortit	Long consonants become short.
kk	k	pukki → pukit; pankki → pankit	Long consonants become short.
p	v	tapa → tavat	Lenition.
t	d	katu → kadut; lahti → lahdet	Lenition.
k	∅	pako → paot	Lenition.
k	v	puku → puvut; kyky → kyvyt	In the combinations -uku- and -yky-.
k	j	jälki → jäljet; sulkea → suljin	When followed by e or i and preceded by h, l or r.
mp	mm	kampa → kammat	Assimilation.
nt	nn	lento → lennot	Assimilation.
lt	ll	kielto → kiellot	Assimilation.
rt	rr	parta → parrat	Assimilation.
nk /ŋk/	ng /ŋː/	kenkä → kengät	Assimilation.

The gradation of loanwords may include gradation of the plosives that are not native to Finnish:

Strong	Weak	Example
bb	b	lobbaan → lobata
gg	g	bloggaan → blogata

=== Burmese ===
Burmese exhibits consonant mutation, in the form of sandhi voicing, to varying degrees across regional dialects. Speakers from Yangon and Upper Myanmar exhibit more consistent use of sandhi voicing and assimilation than speakers from peripheral regions, though local and individual variation exists. In Arakanese (Rakhine), voicing is limited to plain initials, while it is entirely absent in the Intha dialect. The following consonants are eligible for voicing in Burmese:

Original consonant	1st stage of voicing	2nd stage of voicing
/kʰ, k/	/ɡ/	/Ø/
/tɕʰ, tɕ/	/dʑ/ → /j/	—
/sʰ, s/	/z/	—
/tʰ, t/	/d/	/ɾ/
/pʰ, p/	/b/ → /β/ → /m/	/Ø/
/θ/	/ð/	—
ŋ̊	/ŋ/	—
n̥	/n/	—
m̥	/m/	—
ɲ̥	/ɲ/	—

Voicing generally occurs when a voiceable consonant occurs between two vowels, and have voiced consonants. Some commonly used grammatical markers like ⟨တယ်⟩ ([tɛ] → [dɛ] → [ɾɛ]) and ⟨ဘူး⟩ ([bù] → [ù]) also undergo the 2nd stage of voicing. Voicing also occurs in the pronunciation of Burmese numerals and classifiers.

The primary type of sandhi voicing occurs when two syllables are joined to form a compound word, with the initial consonant of the second syllable becoming voiced.

Examples:

/sʰé/ (ဆေး) + /kʰáɴ/ (ခန်း) > /sʰé ɡáɴ/ ("medicine" + "room" → "clinic")

The second type of consonant mutation occurs when the phoneme /dʑ/ after the nasalized final /ɴ/ becomes a /j/ sound in compound words.

Examples:

"blouse" (အင်္ကျီ angkyi) can be pronounced /èɪɴdʑí/ or /èɪɴjí/.

The third type of consonant mutation occurs when phonemes /p, pʰ, b, t, tʰ, d/, after the nasalized final /ɴ/, become /m/ in compound words:

/tàɪɴ/ (တိုင်) + /pɪ̀ɴ/ (ပင်) > /tàɪɴ mɪ̀ɴ/ (တိုင်ပင်) ("to consult")
/táʊɴ/ (တောင်း) + /pàɴ/ (ပန်) > /táʊɴ màɴ/ ("to apologize")
/lè jɪ̀ɴ/ (လေယာဉ်) + /pjàɴ/ (ပျံ) > /lèɪɴ mjàɴ/ ("airplane")

=== Southern Oceanic languages ===
Mutation of the initial consonant of verbs is a feature of several languages in the Southern Oceanic branch of the Austronesian language family.

==== Central Vanuatu ====
Initial consonant mutation occurs in many Central Vanuatu languages like Raga:

nan vano "I went"
nam bano "I go"

Those patterns of mutations probably arose when a nasal prefix, indicating the realis mood, became combined with the verb's initial consonant. The possible ancestral pattern of mutation and its descendants in some modern Central Vanuatu languages are shown below:

Proto-Central Vanuatu	*k > *ŋk	*r > *nr	*p > *mp
Raga (Pentecost)	x > ŋg	t > d	v / vw > b / bw
Northern Apma (Pentecost)	k > ŋg	t > d	v / w > b / bw
Southern Apma (Pentecost)			v / w > b / bw
Ske (Pentecost)		z > d	v / vw > b / bw
Lonwolwol (Ambrym)		r > rV	∅ > bV
Southeast Ambrym	x / h / ∅ > g	t > d	v / h > b
Northern Paama	∅ > k	t > r	
Central/Southern Paama	k / ∅ > g / ŋ	t / r > d	
Nāti (Malekula)	k / ʔ > ŋk	t / r > nt / ntr	v / w > mp / mpw
Maii (Epi)		t > d	v > b
Lewo (Epi)			v / w > p / pw
Lamenu (Epi)			∅ > p
Bierebo (Epi)	k > ŋk	t / c > nd / nj	v / w > p / pw
Baki (Epi)		c > s	v > mb
Bieria (Epi)		t > nd	v > mb
Nakanamanga (Efaté-Shepherds)	k > ŋ	r > t	v / w > p / pw
Namakir (Shepherds)	k > ŋ	t / r > d	v / w > b

==== New Caledonia ====
Initial consonant mutation also serves a grammatical purpose in some New Caledonian languages. For example, Iaai uses initial consonant mutation in verbs to distinguish between specific/definite objects and generic/indefinite objects:

Mutation	Determinate object	Indeterminate object	Meaning
k > x	kap	xəp	"welcome"
l > hl	lele	hlihli	"pull, haul in"
n > hn	nəŋ	hnəŋ	"brandish"
ɳ > hɳ	ɳooc	hɳuuk	"tie"
t > θ	təəʈ	θəəʈ	"lift up by the end"
w > hw	wia	hwiəə	"turn, change"
v > hv	vɛɖen	hvɛɛʈ	"carry on the shoulder"

Those forms likely derive from an earlier reduplication of the first syllable in which the interconsonantal vowel was deleted, resulting in a spirantization of the formerly reduplicated consonant.

=== Dholuo ===
The Dholuo language (one of the Luo languages) shows alternations between voiced and voiceless states of the final consonant of a noun stem. In the construct state (the form that means 'hill of', 'stick of', etc.) the voicing of the final consonant is switched from the absolute state. (There are also often vowel alternations that are independent of consonant mutation.)

- ɡɔt 'hill' (abs.), god (const.)
- lʊθ 'stick' (abs.), luð (const.)
- kɪdo 'appearance' (abs.), kit (const.)
- tʃoɡo 'bone' (abs.), tʃok (const.)
- buk 'book' (abs.), bug (const.)
- kɪtabu 'book' (abs.), kɪtap (const.)

=== Fula ===
Consonant mutation is a prominent feature of the Fula language. The Gombe dialect spoken in Nigeria, for example, shows mutation triggered by declension class. The mutation grades are fortition and prenasalization:

Radical	Fortition	Prenasalization
f	p	p
s	ʃ	ʃ
h	k	k
w	b	mb
r	d	nd
j	dʒ, ɡ	ɲdʒ, ŋɡ
ɣ	ɡ	ŋɡ

For example, the stems rim- 'free man' and [ɣim-] 'person' have the following forms:

- [rimɓe] (class 2), dimo (class 1), ndimon (class 6)
- [ɣimɓe] (class 2), gimɗo (class 1), ŋgimkon (class 6)

=== Indonesian and Malay ===
The active form of a multisyllabic verb with an initial stop consonant or fricative consonant is formed by prefixing the verb stem with meN- in which N stands for a nasal sharing the same place of articulation as the initial consonant:

- garuk → menggaruk (= to scratch), hitung → menghitung (= to count),
- beri → memberi (= to give), fitnah → memfitnah (= to accuse falsely),
- cari → mencari (= to search), dapat → mendapat (= to obtain), *jangkau → menjangkau (= to reach)

An initial consonant that is an unvoiced stop or s is deleted, leaving only the nasal in its place.

- kandung → mengandung (= to contain or to be pregnant),
- putih → memutih (= to turn white),
- satu → menyatu (= to become one / to unite),
- tulis → menulis (= to write).

Applied to verbs starting with a vowel, the nasal is realized as ng ([ŋ]).

Monosyllabic verbs add an epenthetic vowel before prefixing and produce the prefix menge-:

- bor (= boring tool / drill) → mengebor (= to make a hole with drill).

Verbs starting with a nasal or approximant consonant do not add any mutant nasal, only me-.

The colloquial language (especially Jakartan Indonesian) drops me- prefix but tends to replace it with nasalization in some consonants:

- tanya → menanya → nanya
- pikir → memikir → mikir
- merepotkan → ng(e)repotin

=== Latvian ===
More information is available in the Latvian Wikipedia.

Mutation	Example
b→bj	gulbis→gulbja
c→č	lācis→lāča
d→ž	briedis→brieža
dz→dž	dadzis→dadža
g→dz	lūgt→lūdzu
k→c	liekt→liecu
l→ļ	sīlis→sīļa
m→mj	zeme→zemju
n→ņ	zirnis→zirņa
p→pj	krupis→krupja
r→r	teteris→tetera
s→š	lasis→laša
t→š	vācietis→vācieša
v→vj	cirvis→cirvja
z→ž	vēzis→vēža

Also two consonants can mutate as a group.

Mutation	Example
kst→kš	pāksts→pākšu
ln→ļņ	cilnis→ciļņa
sl→šļ	kāpslis→kāpšļa
sn→šņ	atkusnis→atkušņa
zl→žļ	zizlis→zižļa
zn→žņ	zvaigzne→zvaigžņu

=== Ute ===
In Ute, also called Southern Paiute, there are three consonant mutations, which are triggered by different word-stems, The mutations are spirantization, gemination, and prenasalization:

Radical	Spirantization	Gemination	Prenasalization
p	v	pp	mp
t	r	tt	nt
k	ɣ	kk	ŋk
kʷ	ɣʷ	kkʷ	ŋkʷ
ts		tts	nts
s		ss	
m	ŋkʷ	mm	mm
n		nn	nn

For example, the absolutive suffix -pi appears in different forms, according to the noun stem to which it is suffixed:

- movi-ppi 'nose'
- sappI-vi 'belly'
- aŋo-mpi 'tongue'

== See also ==
- Lenition
- Fortition
- Consonant gradation
- Rendaku
- Sonority hierarchy
- Apophony
- Elision
- Historical linguistics
