= Samoyedic =

Samoyedic can refer to:

- Samoyedic languages, language family, make up the Uralic language family along with Finno-Ugric
  - Proto-Samoyedic language, reconstructed earlier form of the languages
- Samoyedic peoples, a people of Siberia
