= Arto Räty =

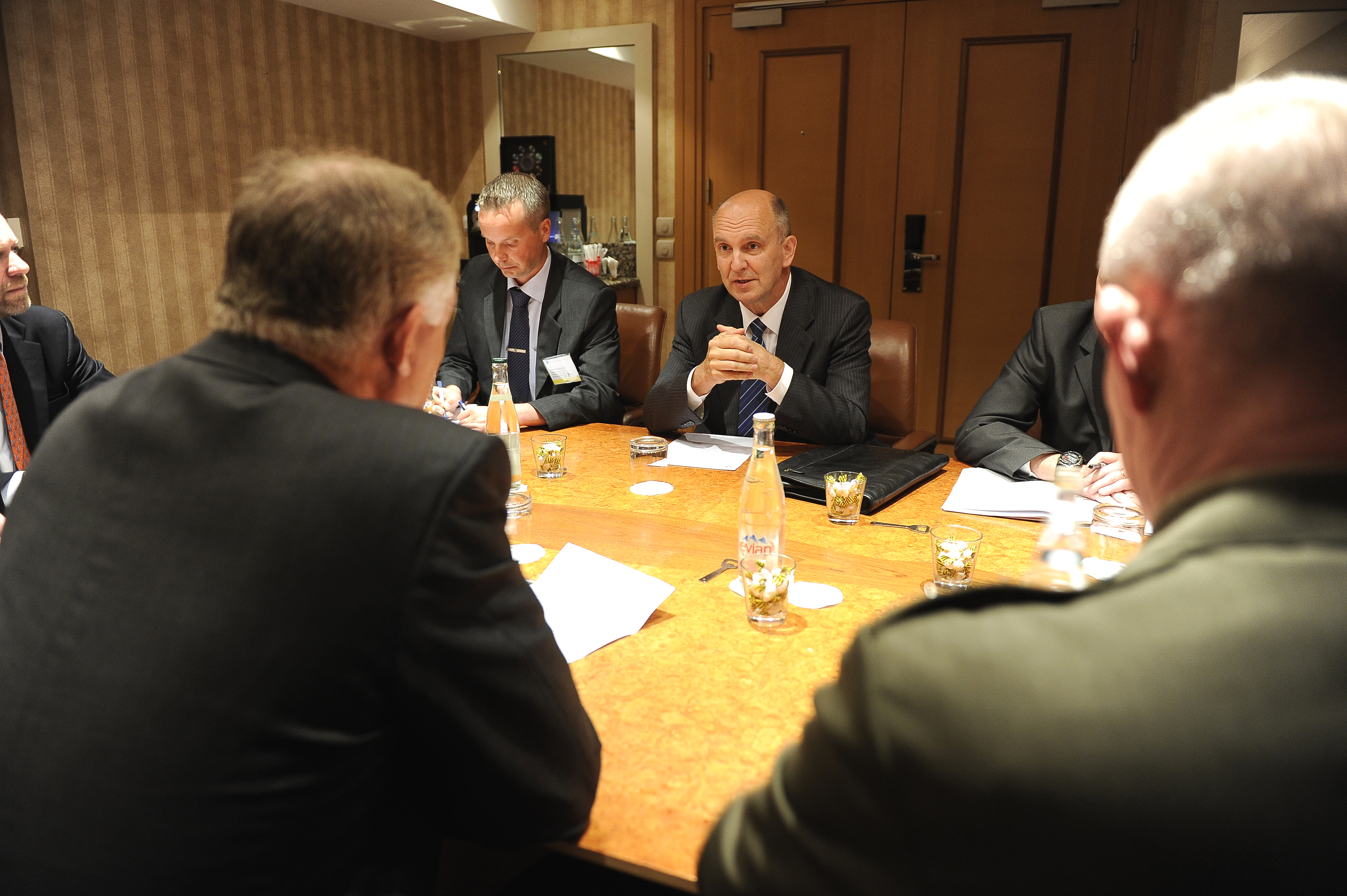
Arto Räty (middle)

Arto Tuomas Räty (born 25 October 1955 in Parikkala, Finland) is a Finnish retired military officer with the rank of lieutenant general. He was promoted a brigadier general in 2004 and lieutenant general in 2010.

During his career, Räty served e.g. in Brussels during 1994–1997 as the military attaché and as a liaison officer with NATO, and in the KFOR operation in Kosovo in 2000, as the head of the Finnish battalion.

In 2006, Räty was in a committee recommended that Finland purchase Airbus A330 MRTT jets that could be used both by Finnair and the Finnish Defence Forces. They would have been used primarily by Finnair, but they could have been modified in 24 hours to suit the needs of the military, both as cargo planes and tanker planes. This would have enabled the Finnish Defence to train its F-18 Hornet pilots to refuel while airborne. The recommendation was not adopted by the state.

The climax of Räty's career was his posting as the chief of staff of the Ministry of Defence during 2011–2015. He sought a second five-year-term in this office, and was according to many the favourite among five candidates, and even tipped to become the next Commander-in-chief of the Finnish Armed Forces, but the Finnish Defence minister Jussi Niinistö nominated instead Major General of the Corps of Engineers Jukka Juusti for this post.
