= Special officer (Finland) =

Category of military personnel in Finnish Defence Forces

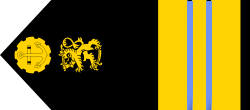
Music captain lieutenant shoulder board, Finnish Navy

Compare: Captain lieutenant shoulder board, Finnish Navy

In the Finnish Defence Forces, special officers (Finnish: Erikoisupseeri : erikois + upseeri) are a group of military personnel which are officers assigned to tasks in areas that required special non-military training: medicine, veterinary medicine, pharmacy, music, economics and technical fields. Their military ranks range from lieutenant to lieutenant general.

The majority of special officers are engineers, eligibility requirement being master's degree in engineering or an engineering degree or a university degree suitable for the position, in addition to non-commissioned officer or reserve officer training.

As of 2023 there are about 800 special officers.

Examples of duties of a special officer include: System Engineer, Conductor, Flight Test Engineer, Mechanical Officer, Quality Manager, Teaching Engineer, Chief Medical Officer, Sector Leader, Military Engineer, Military Doctor, Military Chaplain, Electrical Engineer, Research Engineer, Warehouse Manager.

== Notable special officers ==
- Jukka Juusti, Chief of Staff of the Ministry of Defense (2016-2021), engineer lieutenant general
- Kari Renko, director of the logistics department of the Defense Forces (2020-2022), engineer major general
- Kimmo Koskenvuo, Chief Medical Officer of Finnish Defense Forces (1978-1996), medical lieutenant general
- Pekka Somer, Chief Medical Officer of the Defense Forces (1953–1967), medical lieutenant-general

== See also ==
- Specialist (rank)
- Military chaplain
