= Olavi Litmanen =

Finnish footballer (born 1945)

Personal information
- Date of birth: 17 April 1945 (age 81)
- Place of birth: Saari, Finland
- Positions: Forward; winger

Senior career*
| Years | Team | Apps | (Gls) |
| 1964–1966 | Lahden Reipas | 23 | (4) |
| 1966–1967 | Lahden Palloseura | | (6) |
| 1968–1974 | Lahden Reipas | 136 | (36) |
| 1975 | Lahden Palloseura | | (3) |
| 1977 | Lahden Palloseura | | (8) |
| 1978 | Lahden Reipas | 12 | (0) |
| 1979–1982 | Lahden Palloseura | | (14) |

International career
| 1970–1972 | Finland | 5 | (0) |
- * Club domestic league appearances and goals

Olavi Litmanen (born 17 April 1945) is a Finnish former international footballer who played as a forward. He spent his career with Reipas Lahti in Mestaruussarja and Lahden Palloseura in lower divisions.

He won five Finnish Cup winners' medals with Reipas, 1964, 1972, 1973, 1974 and 1978.

== Personal life ==
Litmanen married a player of the Reipas women's team. He is the father of the Finnish international footballer Jari Olavi Litmanen who also began his career with Reipas.
