= Kesälahti =

- Former municipality
- Kesälahden kunta Kesälahti kommun
- Coat of arms

- Location of Kesälahti in Finland
- Coordinates: 61°53.5′N 029°50′E
- Country: Finland
- Region: North Karelia
- Sub-region: Central Karelia sub-region
- Charter: 1873

Government
  - Municipal manager: Jorma Turunen

Area
  - Total: 583.08 km^{2} (225.13 sq mi)
  - Land: 387.89 km^{2} (149.77 sq mi)
  - Water: 195.19 km^{2} (75.36 sq mi)

Population (2012)
  - Total: 2,326
  - Density: 5.997/km^{2} (15.53/sq mi)
- Time zone: UTC+2 (EET)
  - Summer (DST): UTC+3 (EEST)
- Website: www.kesalahti.fi

Kesälahti (Swedish: Kesälahti, also Kesälax) is a former municipality of Finland. It was consolidated with Kitee on 1 January 2013.

It is located in the province of Eastern Finland and is part of the North Karelia region. The municipality has a population of 2,326 (31 December 2012) and covers an area of 583.08 square kilometres (225.13 sq mi) of which 195.19 km^{2} (75.36 sq mi) is water. The population density is 5.9965/km^{2} (15.531/sq mi).

The municipality was unilingually Finnish. The municipality was also known as "Kesälax" in Swedish. The Swedish name is now considered outdated according to the Institute for the Languages of Finland.

== History ==
Kesälahti was first mentioned in 1589 as a part of the Uukuniemi parish (originally pogost). The Uukuniemi parish was sometimes called Kesälahti as the main church was occasionally in the village, but Uukuniemi was a more common name for the parish. Kesälahti became a chapel community in 1700.

In 1721 according to the Treaty of Nystad, which ended the Great Northern War, Uukuniemi was among the territories ceded to Russia (Old Finland), but Kesälahti was not included in the concessions. Kesälahti became an official parish in 1728.

Kesälahti was consolidated with Kitee in 2013.
