= Uukuniemi =

Former municipality of Finland

Coordinates: 61°47′10″N 30°00′25″E

Coat of arms of former municipality Uukuniemi

Uukuniemi is a former municipality of Finland.

It was located in the province of Southern Finland and was part of the South Karelia region. The municipality had a population of 502 (2004) and it covered an area of 156.58 km² of which 54.88 km² was water. The population density was 5.52 inhabitants per km². The village of Niukkala was the former administrative center of Uukuniemi. Uukuniemi was once the northernmost and the easternmost municipality of the Kymi province.

The municipality was unilingually Finnish. It was annexed with municipalities of Saari and Parikkala on January 1, 2005. The new municipality was named Parikkala.
