= Prapojsk kovsh-bratina =

15th–17th-century Belarusian wooden vessel with calendar-zodiac imagery

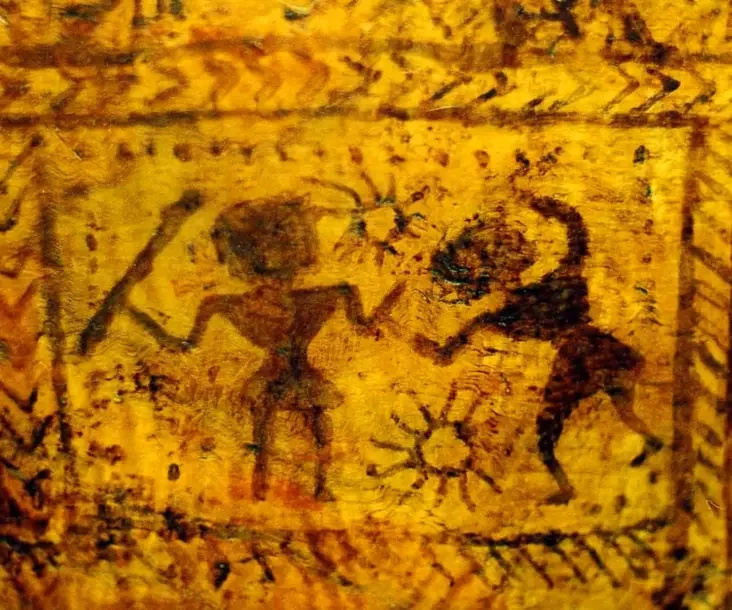
- "Two warriors with two Suns" symbol on the vessel
- Artist: Unknown local master
- Year: 15th–17th centuries
- Type: Kovsh (bratina)
- Medium: Birch burl, wood carving, monochrome and polychrome painting
- Dimensions: 19–25.5 cm × 46–51.5 cm × 57.3 cm
- Location: Museum of Belarusian Folk Art, Akolica

The Prapojsk kovsh-bratina (Belarusian: Прапойскі коўш-браціна), also known as the Zodiac kovsh, is an intricately decorated wooden Belarusian drinking vessel resembling a kovsh (a ladle-like vessel) or a bratina (a ceremonial vessel for shared drinking), which dates from the 15th to 17th centuries. Carved from a solid birch burl, the wooden kovsh is decorated with a monochrome painting depicting a Belarusian folk art calendar-zodiac system.

The kovsh is held in the collection of the Museum of Belarusian Folk Art in Akolica, a branch of the National Art Museum of the Republic of Belarus, and is one of the oldest wooden artistic objects in Belarusian museum collections. For a long time, it was believed that the kovsh was found in the cellars of a ruined convent in Hrodna. Archival research in 2023, proved that the artifact actually originated from the eastern Belarusian town of Prapojsk (modern Slauharad), and was crafted within the Slavic traditions of the Grand Duchy of Lithuania.

== History and provenance ==
The first photograph of the kvosh was published in 1972 by art historian Mikhail Katsar in a monograph dedicated to Belarusian folk art. For decades, scientific literature perpetuated the myth of its Hrodna origins. It was widely believed that after World War II, the kovsh was found in the cellars of a local church, supposedly the Bridgettine convent, which Katsar had explored during a 1946 expedition. Relying on this "western" origin, researchers like Lithuanian ethnoastronomer Jonas Vaiškūnas and Daiva Vaitkevičienė interpreted the vessel through the lens of Baltic pagan mythology, linking it to the Trakai Voivodeship.

It was not until 2023 that art historian Stanislau Chavus published archival data that definitively refuted the Hrodna myth. He discovered that the kovsh originally belonged to the Church of the Nativity of the Mother of God in Prapojsk (Bykhaw uyezd). According to local 19th-century legends, the vessel was supposedly gifted to the church by the Russian Tsar Alexei Mikhailovich in the mid-17th century. Modern historians consider this an ideological myth, as the Tsar never visited Prapojsk, and local churches at the time were Uniate.

In the late 1870s, through the efforts of Mogilev governor Alexander Dembovetsky, the kovsh was transferred to the Mogilev Museum, where it was officially described by Mikhail Fursov in 1898. It was exhibited at the Minsk Regional Exhibition in 1918. Lost during the post-WWI turmoil, it was accidentally rediscovered in 1923 on the grounds of a convent in Minsk. During World War II, the German occupation forces looted the collection and took the kovsh to Koblenz. After the war, Soviet authorities recovered the artifact; it passed through the Hrodna Historical and Archaeological Museum (which likely birthed the Hrodna myth) before permanently entering the State Art Museum of the BSSR.

== Form and attribution ==
The vessel is a large wooden kovsh-bratina (a communal drinking bowl) carved from a single piece of birch burl. It is 57.3 cm long and has a volume of 23.7 liters. Researchers, such as Yauhen Sakhuta, assumed it was a Russian import, classifying it as a "Kozmodemyansk" or a Volga-type ladle, produced by Russian streltsy artisans in the Tsardom of Russia. Research by Dzmitry Skvarcheuski and Illia Butau disproved this showing that traditional Kozmodemyansk ladles were made of linden wood, had a boat-like shape, a sharp pouring lip, and a carved loop under the handle.

The Prapojsk artifact is round, lacks a sharp pouring lip, and is made of birch. The closest morphological analogues to the Prapojsk kovsh are the elite silver ladles from the first third of the 15th century bearing Cyrillic inscriptions, which were discovered in 1991 as part of the Litva hoard in the Maladzyechna District. Those silver vessels were produced by local Belarusian craftsmen from the Grand Duchy of Lithuania. The round shape is more archaic and typical of the local medieval tradition, confirming the artifact's authenticity as a product of Slavic craftsmanship within the Duchy.

== Painting layers and symbolism ==
Before its restoration in Moscow at the Grabar workshops (1956–1968), the kovsh was covered in a polychrome oil paint layer over levkas, applied between the late 17th and early 18th centuries. During restoration, this upper Christian layer was almost entirely removed to reveal the original monochrome painting underneath. The lost upper layer featured images of Saint Nicholas, Saint George, the Apostles Peter and Paul, and the patrons of beekeeping, Zosima and Savvatiy. Notably, Peter and Paul were depicted holding a ciborium, mirroring descriptions in 18th-century Uniate church inventories from Prapojsk, proving the vessel's use as church utensil.

=== Original "Zodiac" calendar ===
The primary monochrome layer, executed in a technique combining wood burning and linear drawing, consists of a 10 cm high decorative band containing twelve medallions with anthropomorphic, zoomorphic, and ornithomorphic figures accompanied by solar symbols. Lithuanian ethnoastronomer Jonas Vaiškūnas analyzed the figures, identifying them as a local astronomical calendar based on heliacal risings and settings of key constellations. Further research by Belarusian historians Siarhei Sanko, Siarhei Vitsiaz, and Dzmitry Skvarcheuski confirmed that the 12 signs represent a unique fusion of the classical Zodiac with the local traditional folk calendar and mythology. The animals (horse, deer, goat, crane) directly correlate with characters from the winter Koliada masquerades and key seasonal agricultural markers.

Symbolism of the zodiac signs on the Prapojsk kovsh
No.	Image	Figure on the kovsh	Classical equivalent	Vaiškūnas's interpretation (Ethnoastronomy & Baltic myth)	Skvarcheuski's interpretation (Belarusian folk calendar)
1		Unidentified symbol (tentatively "spear").	Pisces	Placing Pisces first indicates a local year counting from the vernal equinox.	Late February — Late March. The sign marks the beginning of the new agricultural year, including Maslenitsa week and the holiday of Audoccia-Viasnouka (March 1).
2		A figure in a sheepskin coat (?) or a "furrow".	Aries	Represents a mythological hero or winter character.	Late March — Late April. The central event is the vernal equinox (March 20). Corresponds to the Annunciation (March 25) — the awakening of Mother Earth, when the first furrow was drawn.
3		A rider on a horse (moving left).	Taurus	Associated with the heliacal setting of the Pleiades (start of spring). The rider is compared to Baltic deities Ūsiņš or Perkūnas.	Late April — Late May. Linked to the holiday of Saint George (Yurya, April 23), depicted as a rider replacing an ancient fertility deity. Astronomically tied to the highest rising of Arcturus.
4		Two warriors with two Suns.	Gemini	Matches the classical sign, symbolizing a dualistic worldview.	Late May — Late June. Corresponds to the summer solstice (June 21), emphasizing day and night aspects. A prolonged festive period: Siomukha, Rusallia, and Kupalle.
5		A bird resembling a peacock (moving left).	Cancer	The peacock (or Firebird) is a solar symbol traditionally associated with the August harvest.	Late June — Late July. The holiday of Saint Elijah (Illia, July 20) marks the boundary between summer and autumn and the start of the harvest (zazhynki).
6		A bird resembling a peacock (moving right).	Leo	Linked to the autumnal equinox and rye gathering.	Late July — Late August. Mirrors the previous sign. Symbolizes the ritual actions related to the active harvesting of crops.
7		A bird resembling a crane or stork.	Virgo	The rising of the Crane constellation fell in November, linking it to bird migration and St. Martin's Day.	Late August — Late September. Linked to the autumnal equinox (September 22) and autumn bird migration. Corresponds to holidays honoring Mother Earth and the harvest (Prachystaya, Uzdzvizhanne).
8		Two Suns (with straight and swastika-like rays).	Libra	Matches the classical symbol of balance (equinox).	Late September — Late October. Symbolizes the transition to winter. The main holiday is Pokrovy (October 1), which began the traditional wedding season.
9		A large and small deer with the Moon.	Scorpio	Associated with the winter solstice and the myth of the Nine-Horned Deer carrying the new Sun on its antlers.	Late October — Late November. Represents the traditional period of honoring ancestors — Dziady.
10		A warrior with a spear and a solar disk.	Sagittarius	Matches the classical sign, though a more characteristic local weapon — a spear — replaces the bow.	Late November — Late December. The central event is the winter solstice (December 21) and the holiday of Winter Saint Nicholas (December 6).
11		A leaping goat with the Sun on its back.	Capricorn	Matches traditional iconography. The sun sign indicates the turning towards summer.	Late December — Late January. Directly linked to the celebration of Koliada, where the Goat is a central character of the masquerade.
12		A leaping horse with the Sun on its back.	Aquarius	Explains the replacement of the water sign with a Horse through Baltic mythology (the "heavenly horse" emerging from the sea) and the ritual "Baptism of the Foal".	Late January — Late February. Local interpretation of the water sign. Features the holidays of Hramnitsy (February 2) and the horse holiday Ulassie (February 11).

== See also ==
- Kovsh

== Bibliography ==
- Скварчэўскі, Д. В.; Бутаў, І. С. (2025). Драўляны коўш са збору Нацыянальнага мастацкага музея Рэспублікі Беларусь: да пытання аб атрыбуцыі [A wooden kovsh from the collection of the National Art Museum of the Republic of Belarus: on the question of attribution]. Часопіс Беларускага дзяржаўнага ўніверсітэта. Гісторыя (in Belarusian) (4): 41–51.
- Vaiškūnas, J. (2008). "Some Peripheral Forms of the Mediterranean and Oriental Zodiac Traditions in Heathen Lithuania". Archaeologia Baltica. 10: 86–93.
