= Khalili Collection of Enamels of the World =

Private art collection

The Khalili Collection of Enamels of the World
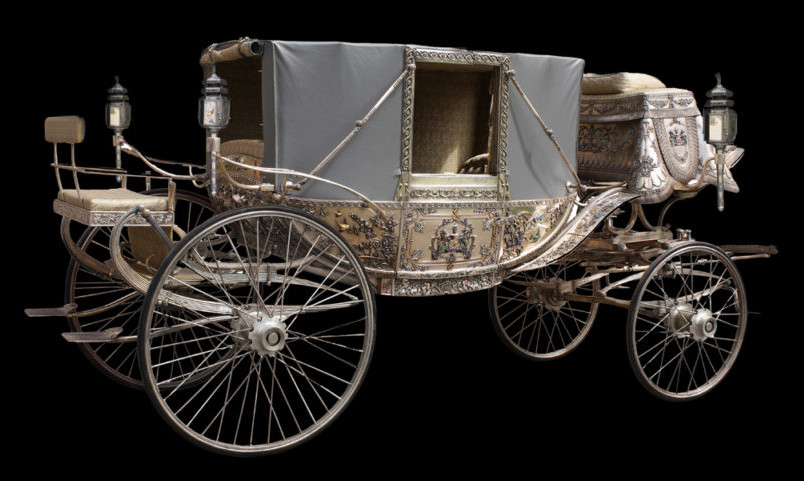
- Enamelled silver carriage that belonged to Bhavsinhji II, Maharaja of Bhavnagar
- Curators: Nasser D. Khalili (founder); Dror Elkvity (Curator and Chief Co-ordinator); Haydn Williams (special advisor)
- Size (no. of items): 1,300
- Website: www.khalilicollections.org/all-collections/enamels-of-the-world/

The Khalili Collection of Enamels of the World is a private collection of enamel artworks from the period 1700 to 2000, assembled by the British scholar, collector and philanthropist Nasser D. Khalili. It is one of the eight Khalili Collections, each of which is considered among the most important in its field.

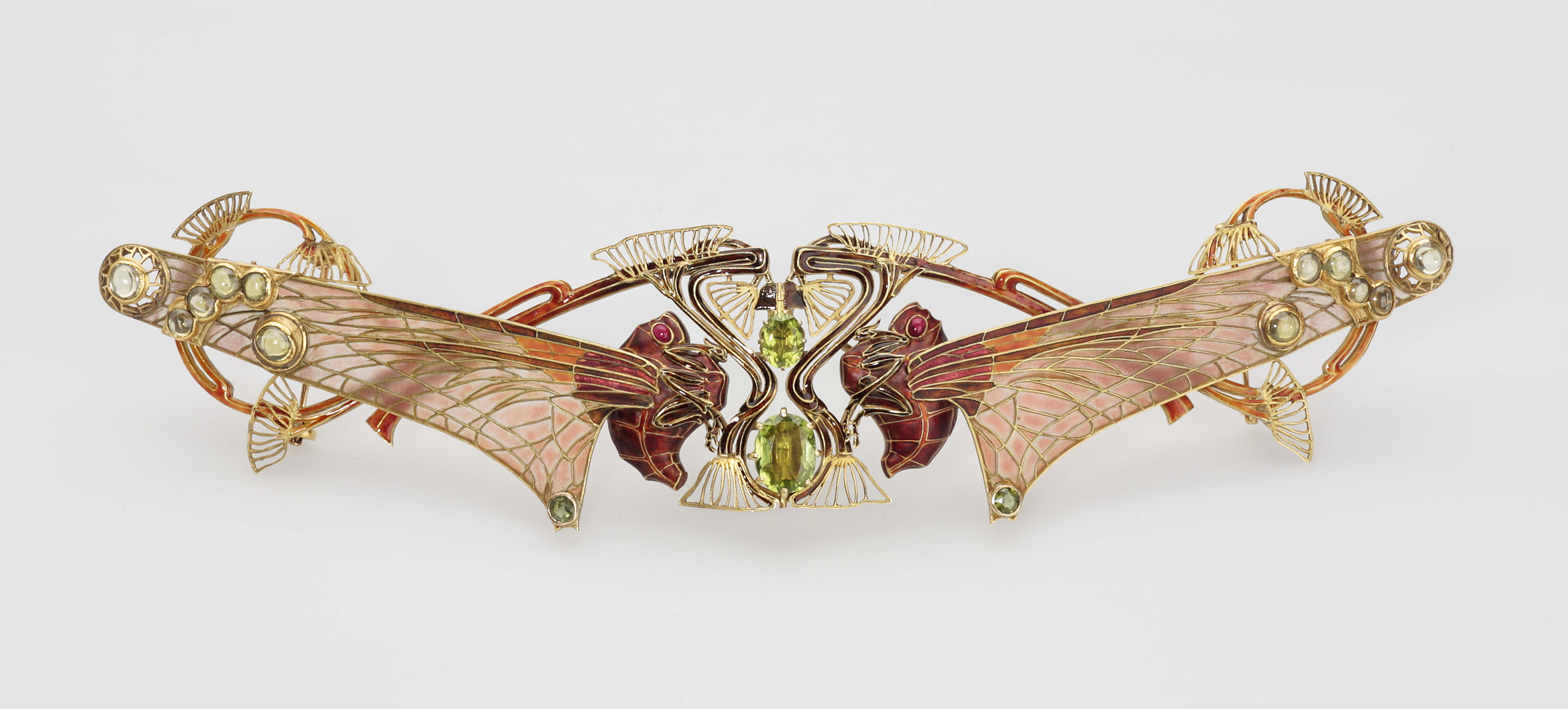
Corsage with the stamp of Lalique, Paris, c.1903–1905

The most extensive private collection of its kind, it consists of over 1,300 pieces and showcases the evolution of enamelling over a 300-year period. By including objects from Western Europe, Russia, Islamic countries, China, Japan, and America, it shows how these centres of enamel production influenced each other's styles. The best-known European enamellists are represented, including Peter Carl Fabergé, Cartier, and René Lalique, along with the Meiji-era Japanese artists who perfected the firing process. The collection illustrates the role of patronage in enamelling as many of its objects were created for royal or imperial households. These include the enamelled chariot belonging to Bhavsinhji II, Maharaja of Bhavnagar and a painted enamel throne table with the seal mark of the 18th century Chinese Qianlong emperor. Other objects include presentation chargers, jewellery, miniatures and ornamental pieces. The collection was the basis for a 2010 exhibition at the Hermitage Museum.

== The collection ==
The collection is one of eight assembled, conserved, published and exhibited by Khalili, each of which is considered among the most important in its field, according to UNESCO. Three of them contain enamels, the others being the Khalili Collection of Japanese Art and the Khalili Collection of Islamic Art. The enamels collection consists of over 1,300 pieces and showcases the evolution of enamelling over a 300-year period. It is the most comprehensive private collection of its kind.

== Works ==
=== European works ===
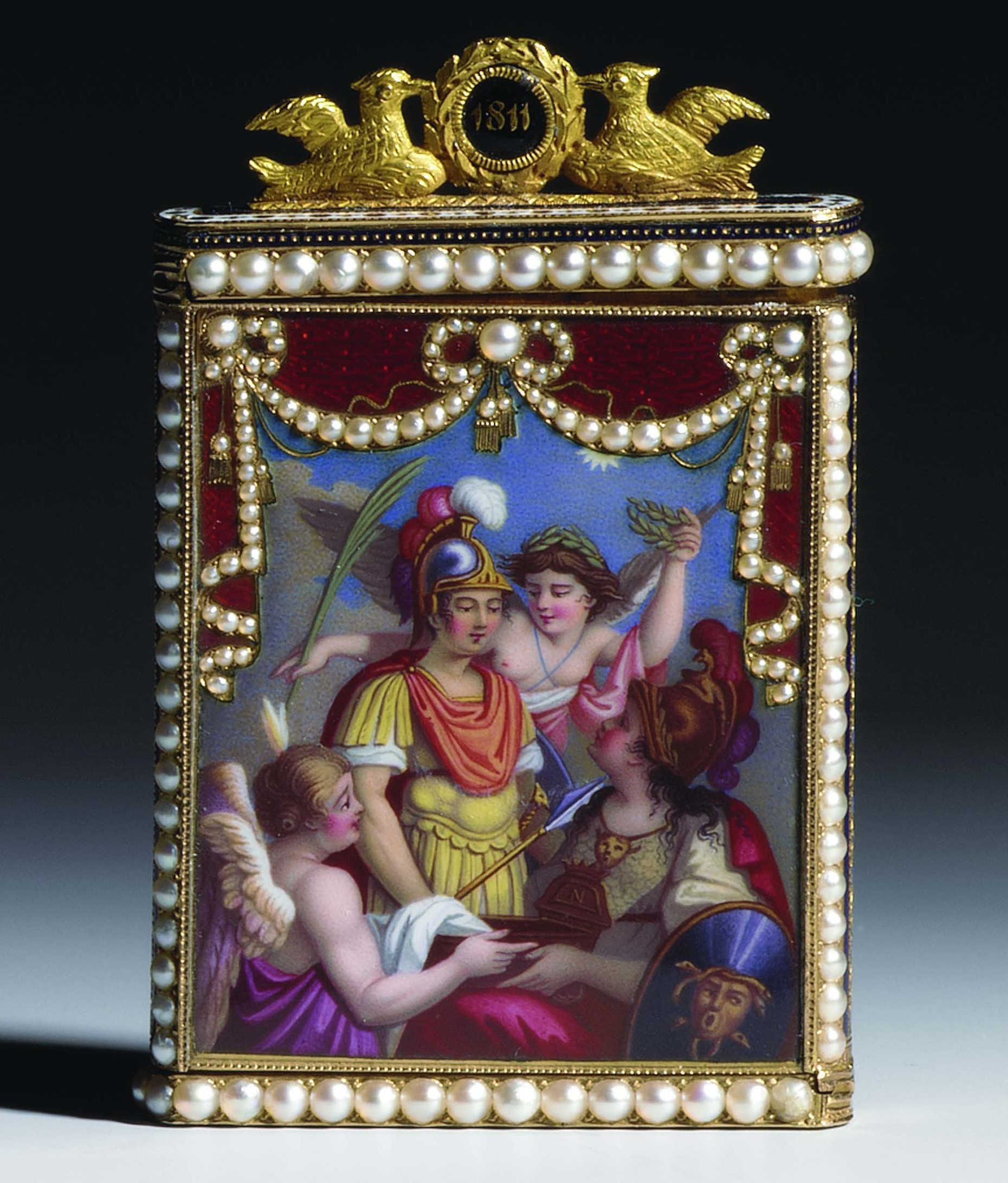
Almanac decorated with allegorical miniature painting, Paris, c.1811

A range of enamelling techniques, including plique-à-jour, ronde-bosse, and basse-taille were used by European craftsmen from 1700 onwards. Watchmakers in Geneva and silver-workers in Augsburg integrated enamel decoration into their work. Limoges in France was a centre for painted enamel from the late 15th century onwards. French workshops developed polychrome techniques in the early 17th century, giving their works much greater realism, similar to watercolour and gouache portraits. Portraits on painted enamel, as a way of decorating small objects, became common until largely replaced by portrait photography. Other uses of enamel continued into the 20th century, with mass production used for many kinds of wares from the most mundane to award-winning artistic examples.

The collection's European works come from Paris, Geneva, and Vienna, among other locations, and include decorative boxes, containers and other ornamental items by artists including René Lalique, Jean-Valentin Morel, and Adrien Vachette. A surtout de table by Lalique has two cast bronze peacocks, using enamel to colour their feathers and crests. One item from Paris is a decimal clock with one face showing normal twelve-hour time, a Moon phase indicator, and another face showing decimal time, which was promoted in the aftermath of the French Revolution. Works from early twentieth century Paris include some from the Cartier jewellery firm and its contemporaries. The Cartier items in the collection include timepieces and small cases. Other Parisian enamellers represented include Van Cleef & Arpels, Lacloche Paris, and Jean Schlumberger. A silver and gold timepiece by Maison Vever was exhibited at the Paris Exposition Universelle of 1889 as part of a display that won a Grand Prix for jewellery design. Its decoration illustrates the four seasons, the signs of the zodiac, and the four elements.

Many of the objects reflect the patronage of Europe's royal families. A silver-gilt casket dated 1897 was commissioned by Queen Elisabeth of Romania as a gift for the artist Jean-Jules-Antoine Lecomte du Nouÿ. With champlevé enamel portraits and engraved text suggested by the Queen, it celebrates creativity and genius. A gold almanac was commissioned by Marie Louise, Empress of the French and comes in a leather case stamped with the French Imperial Eagle. It has an allegorical depiction of the birth of Napoleon II attended by Minerva, Cupid, Mars and Victory. A gold watch with chatelaine by Charles Oudin commemorates the wedding of Amédée de Béjarry, a French count. A desk set celebrates the engagement of Crown Prince Umberto of Italy and Archduchess Mathilda of Austria. A ewer with painted enamel was a wedding gift for William, Prince of Hohenzollern and Princess Maria Teresa of Bourbon-Two Sicilies. The European enamel paintings in the collection include a portrait of Marshal Turenne by the Geneva-born artist Jean Petitot who worked for the English court of Charles I as well as for the French court.

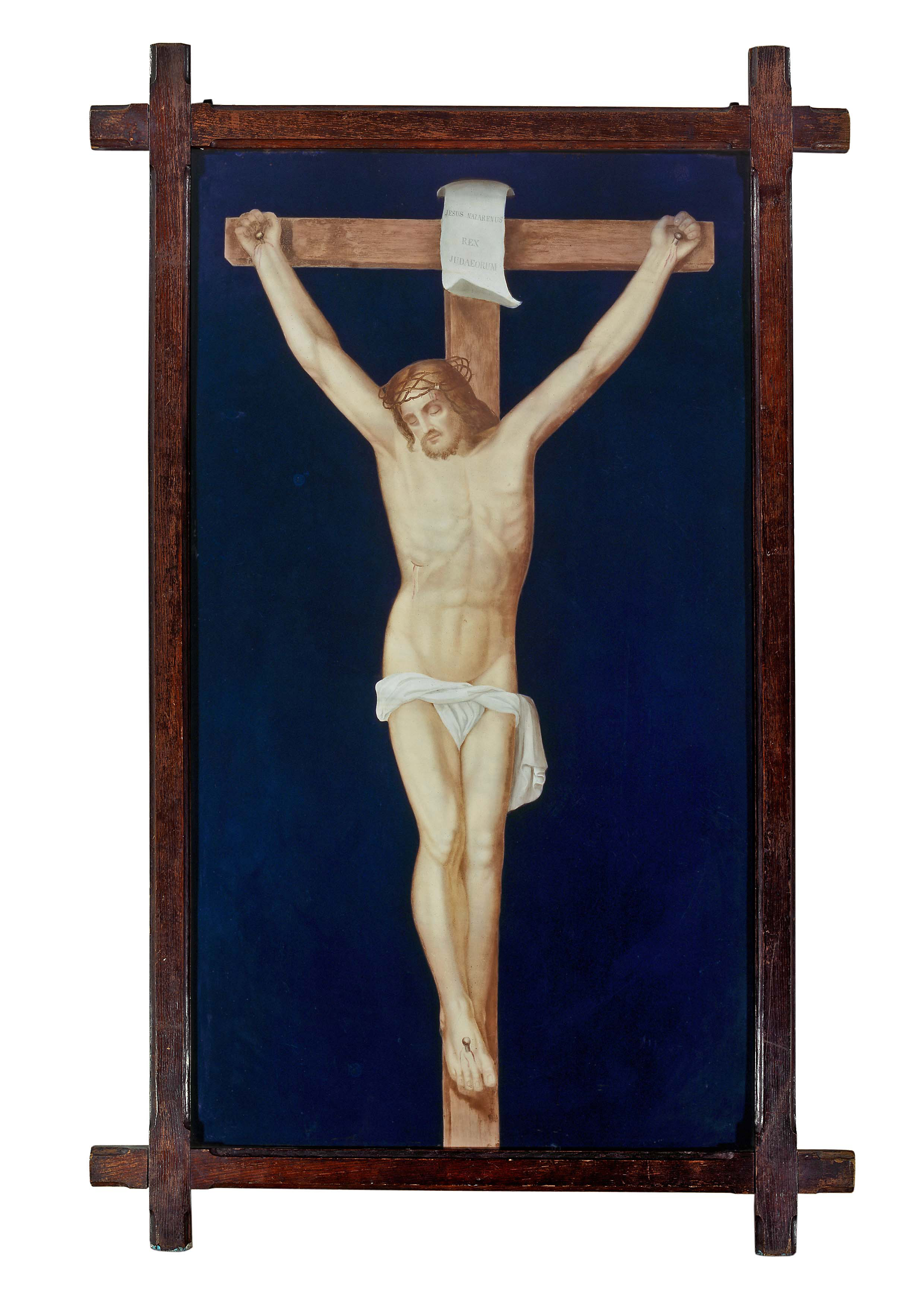
19th-century Limoges plaque depicting the crucifixion, the largest known single-piece enamel painting

English enamels were typically not signed, making identification of artists difficult, but the collection includes vases with the mark of George Richards Elkington and several other English works. The English artist Henry Bone was known for especially large enamel portraits. His works in the collection include portraits of Queen Victoria, Queen Charlotte, and Royal Navy captain William Hoste. Other portraits depict George III, Lord Raglan, William Kent, and Hugh Chamberlen the younger. Other paintings in the collection have religious or mythological subjects, including work by Charles Boit and George Michael Moser. Still life and landscape art are also included.

In the late 19th century, technological advances allowed for painted enamel panels of a much greater size than what could previously be produced. The collection includes a two metres (6 ft 7 in) high depiction of the Crucifixion of Jesus in a Renaissance style which is the largest known single-piece enamel painting. Thought to be by Paul Soyer of Limoges who is responsible for similar large paintings, this was likely commissioned as a gift for the Vatican.

The collection includes many Swiss decorative boxes from the period 1785 to 1835. Geneva in the 18th century was successful at exporting jewellery and painted enamel, including gold snuff boxes, to the rest of Europe. Many boxes in the collection are decorated with miniature paintings, sometimes versions of well-known works. Subjects include Napoleon crossing the bridge at Arcole, the Judgement of Paris, Roman charity, the infant Christ, and Cupid disarmed by Euphrosyne. An inscription on one box indicates it was presented to the American artist George Catlin by Nicholas I of Russia in 1845. Another box is from the Royal House of Saxony and bears a double portrait of Prince Fernando (the future Fernando VII of Spain) and his wife Princess Maria Antonia of Naples and Sicily. One box by the artist Jean George Rémond shows a portrait of Louis XIV of France. Another box bears the mark of the firm of Jean-François Bautte and Jean-Gabriel Moynier. Snuff boxes with miniature portraits of the monarch were common diplomatic gifts in 18th century Europe; an example in the collection bears a portrait of Francis I of the Two Sicilies. Mahmud II, Sultan of the Ottoman Empire, also adopted this practice, and the collection includes a snuff box from Geneva with his portrait inside the lid.

The P. Bruckmann company of Heilbronn, Germany, exhibited at several international art exhibitions. The collection includes a silver wine cistern, 107 cm high, that was the centrepiece of their display at the Stuttgart exhibition of 1896. The cistern includes figures of Hedwig of Saxony and of Marie, the heroine of the novel Lichtenstein.

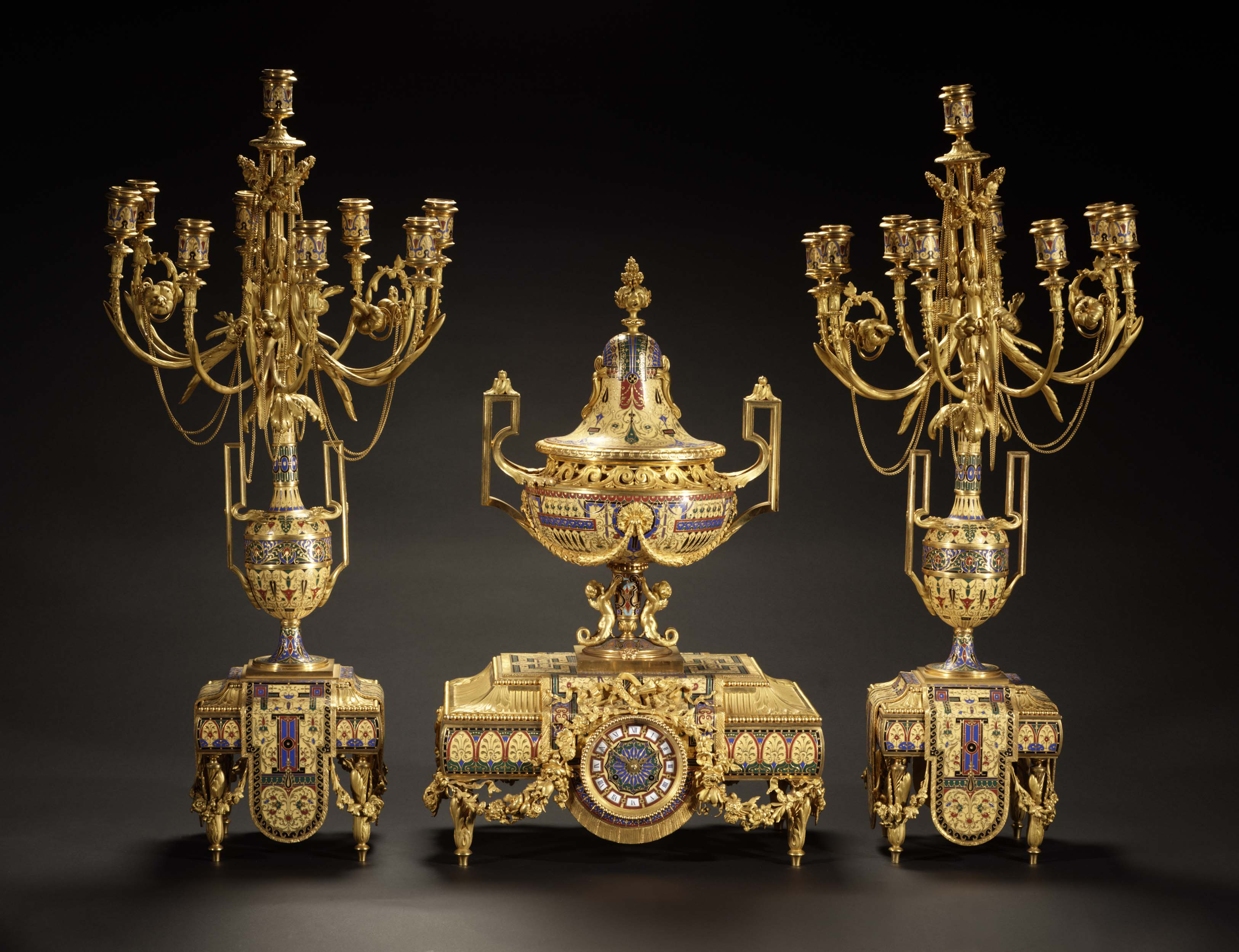
Garniture from a Vanderbilt house in New York. Made in Paris, c.1880

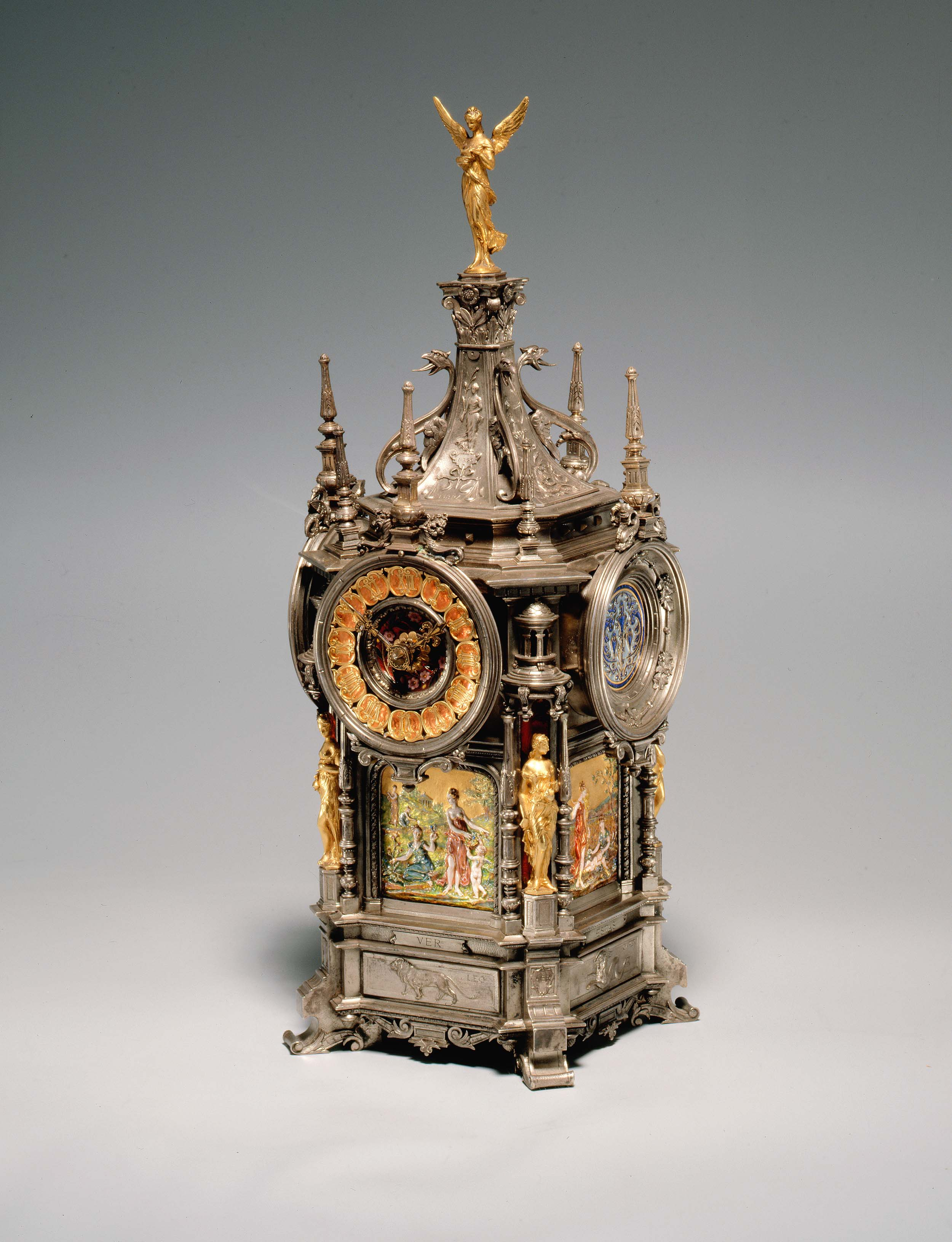
Timepiece by Maison Vever, c.1889

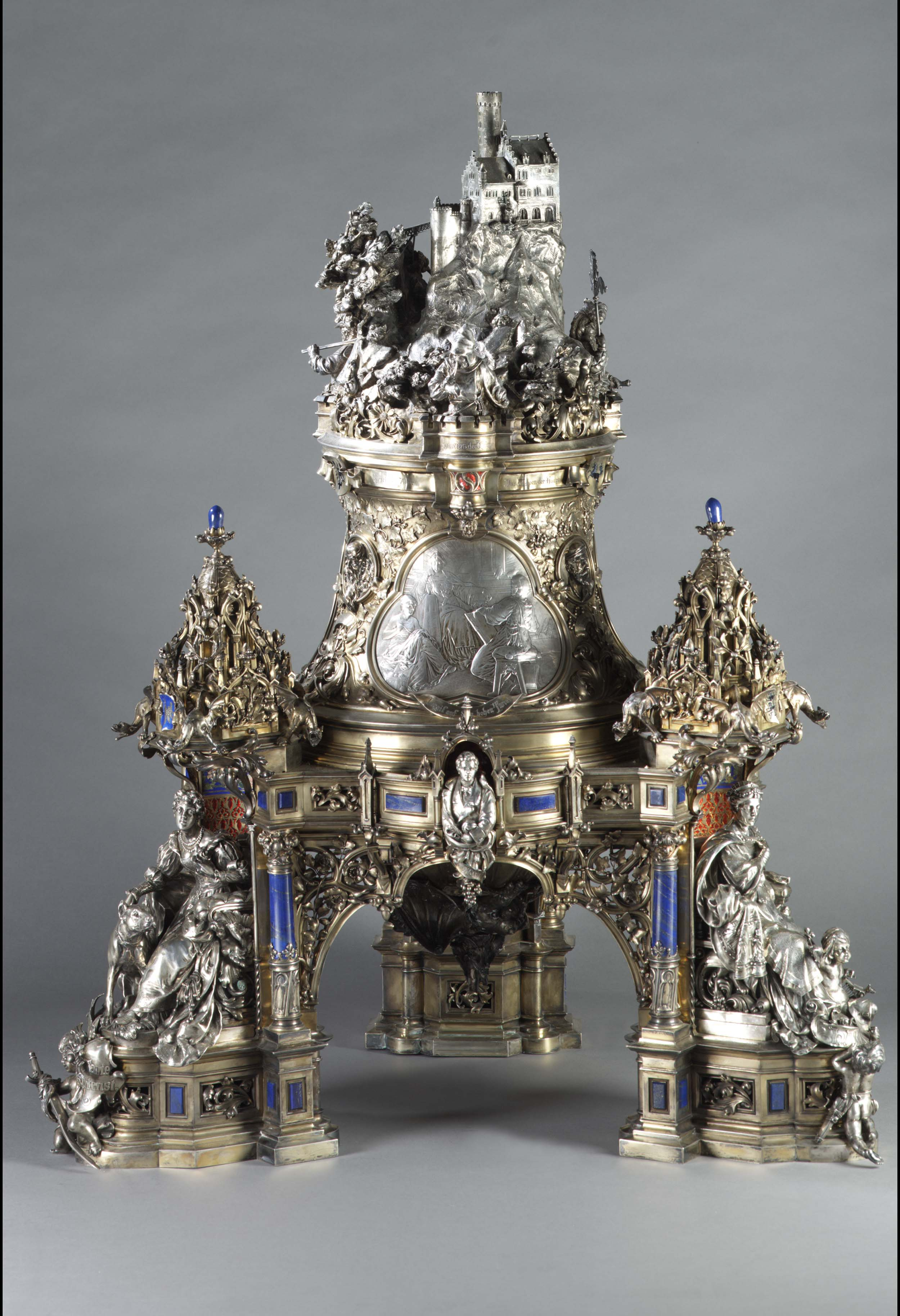
Wine cistern topped by a model of Berg Lichtenstein from Heilbronn, Germany, c.1896

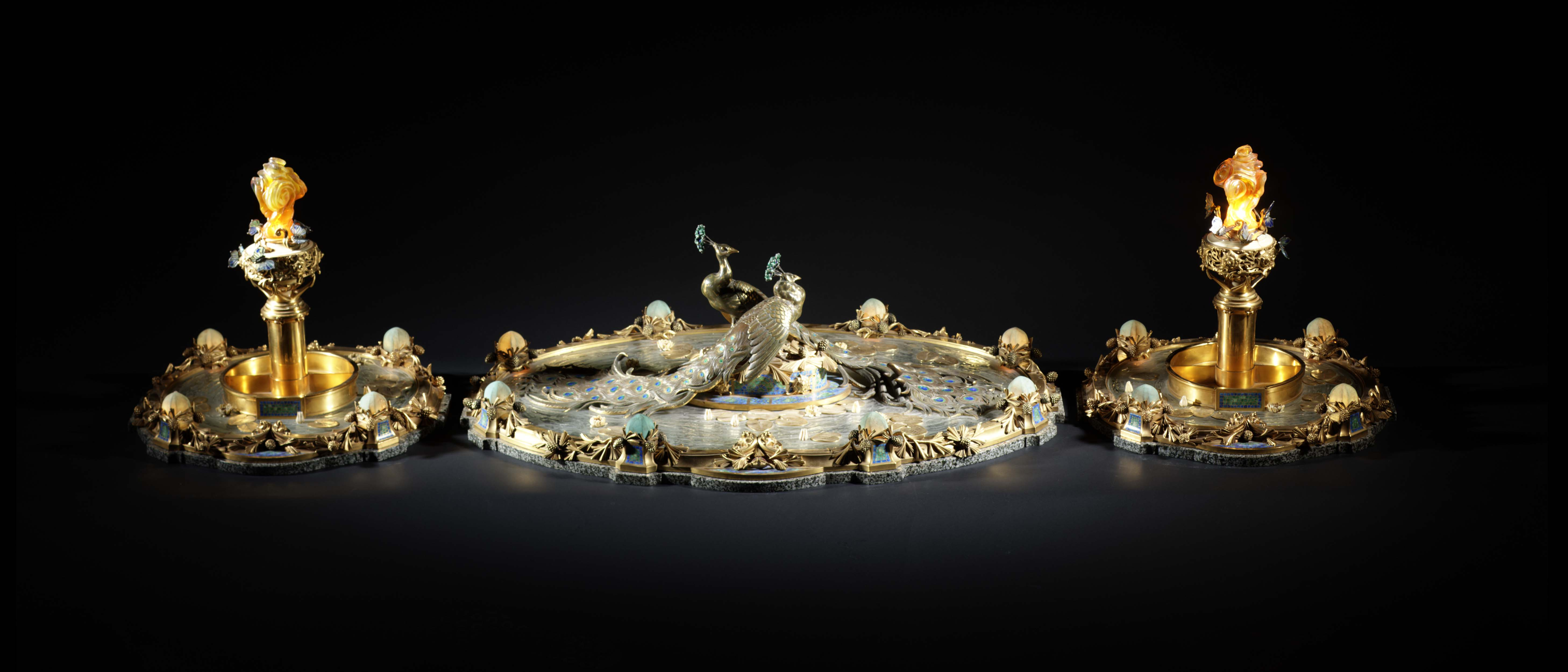
Surtout de table by Lalique, Paris, c.1903

=== Russian works ===
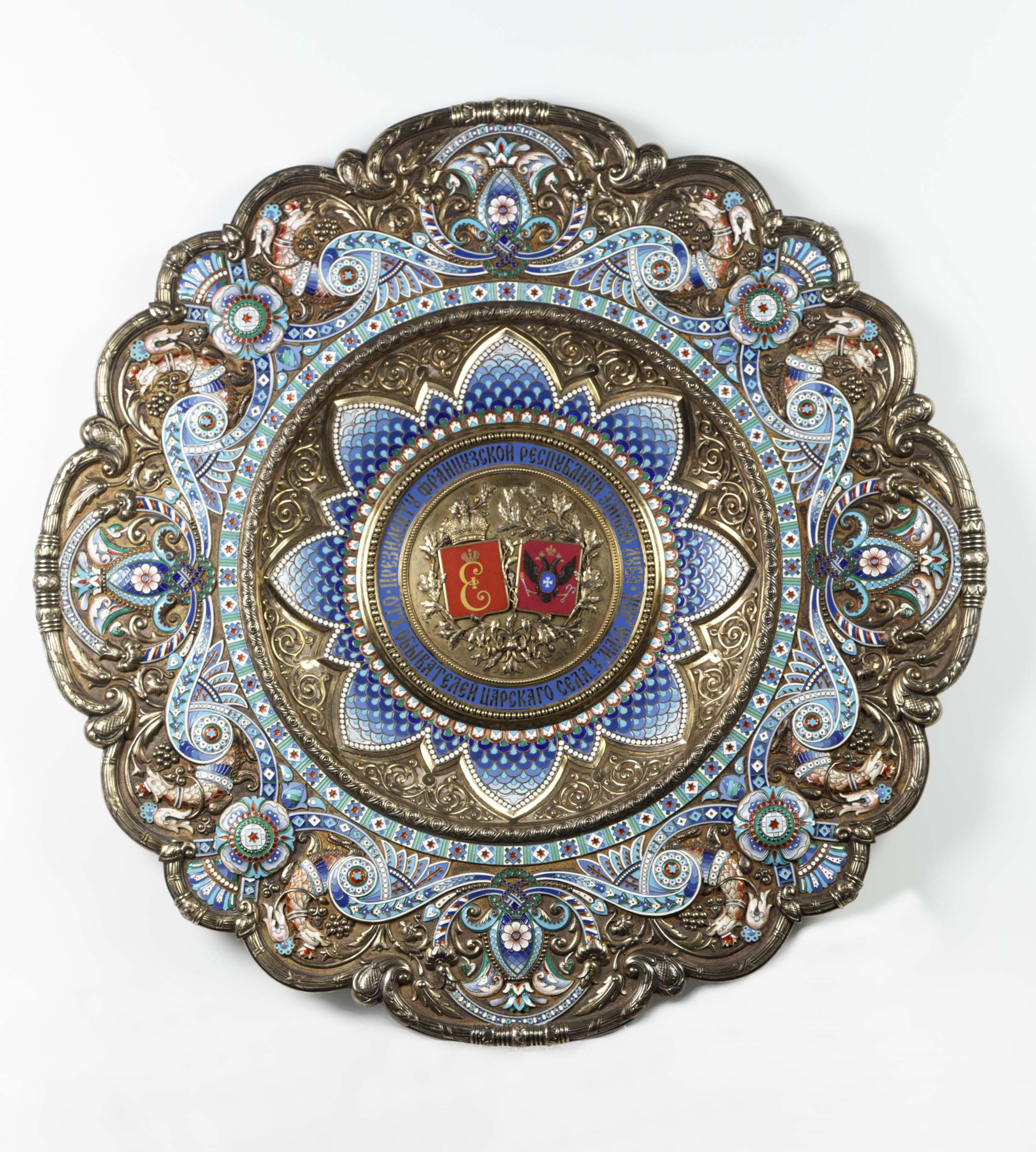
Dish presented to Émile Loubet by the residents of Tsarskoye Selo, 1902

Some works in the collection bear the mark of Peter Carl Fabergé whose father had founded the House of Fabergé in Saint Petersburg. Fabergé acquired a reputation for enamel artworks of the highest quality and received commissions from the Russian Imperial family, as well as being awarded the titles of Master Goldsmith and Goldsmith by Special Appointment to the Imperial Crown. In the 1880s Fabergé greatly expanded the range of colours and patterns of enamel surfaces, machining repeating patterns onto the underlying metal. His employees included the enamel artists Henrik Wigström, Michael Perkhin, and Hjalmar Armfeldt who are represented in the collection. The collection's objects from the House of Fabergé include timepieces, cases, frames, and a fan combining lace and gauze with silver, gold, and painted enamel.

An independent enameller who supplied filigree enamel to Fabergé was Feodor Rückert. Rückert's style changed dramatically during his career, at first imitating other artists then developing his own distinctive decorative style. The collection has works from before and after this change.

A bread and salt-dish given to President Émile Loubet of France by the residents of Tsarskoye Selo in Russia in May 1902 bears the arms of Tsarskoye Selo and cypher of Empress Elizabeth I.

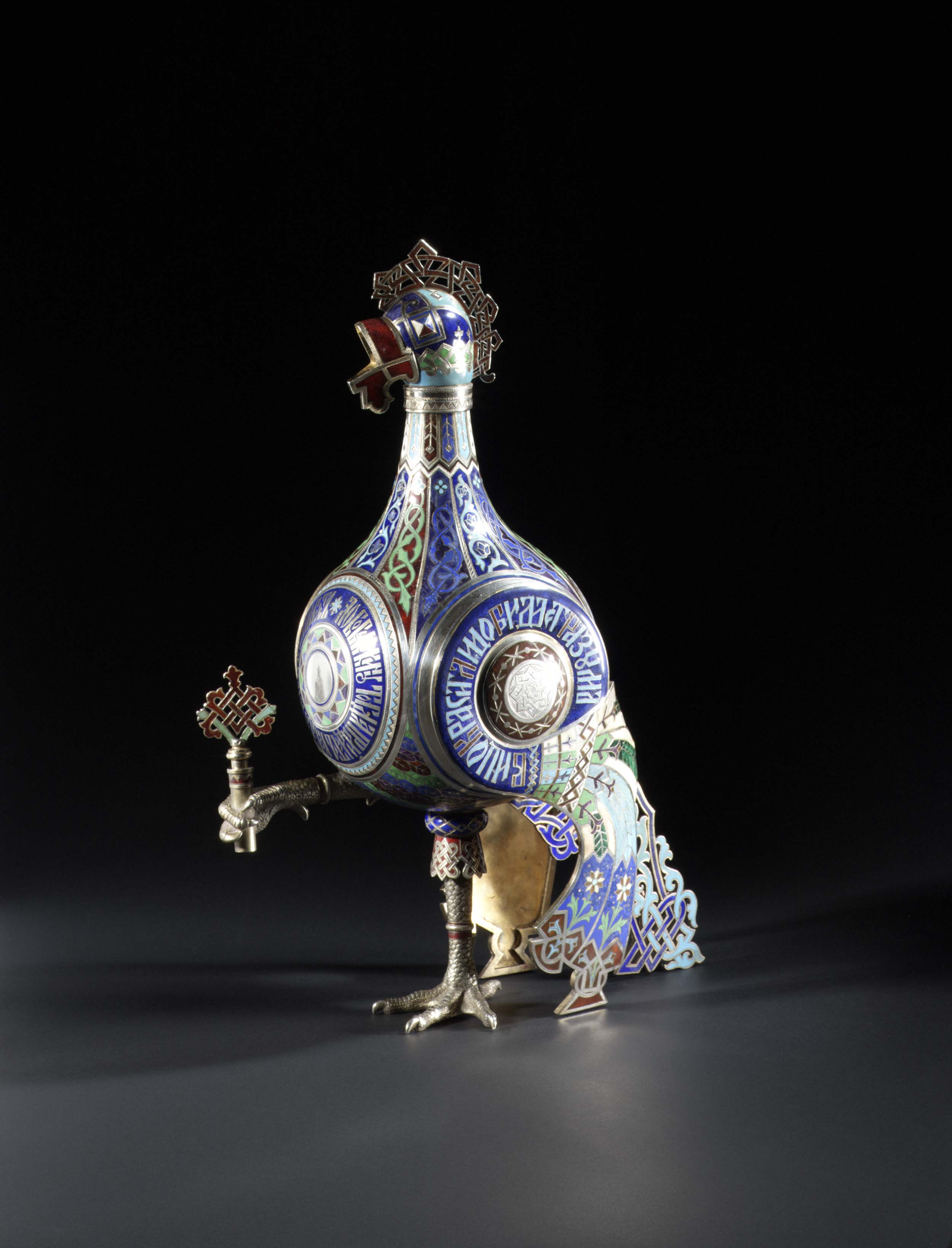
Cistern in the form of a stylised cockerel, Saint Petersburg, c.1870

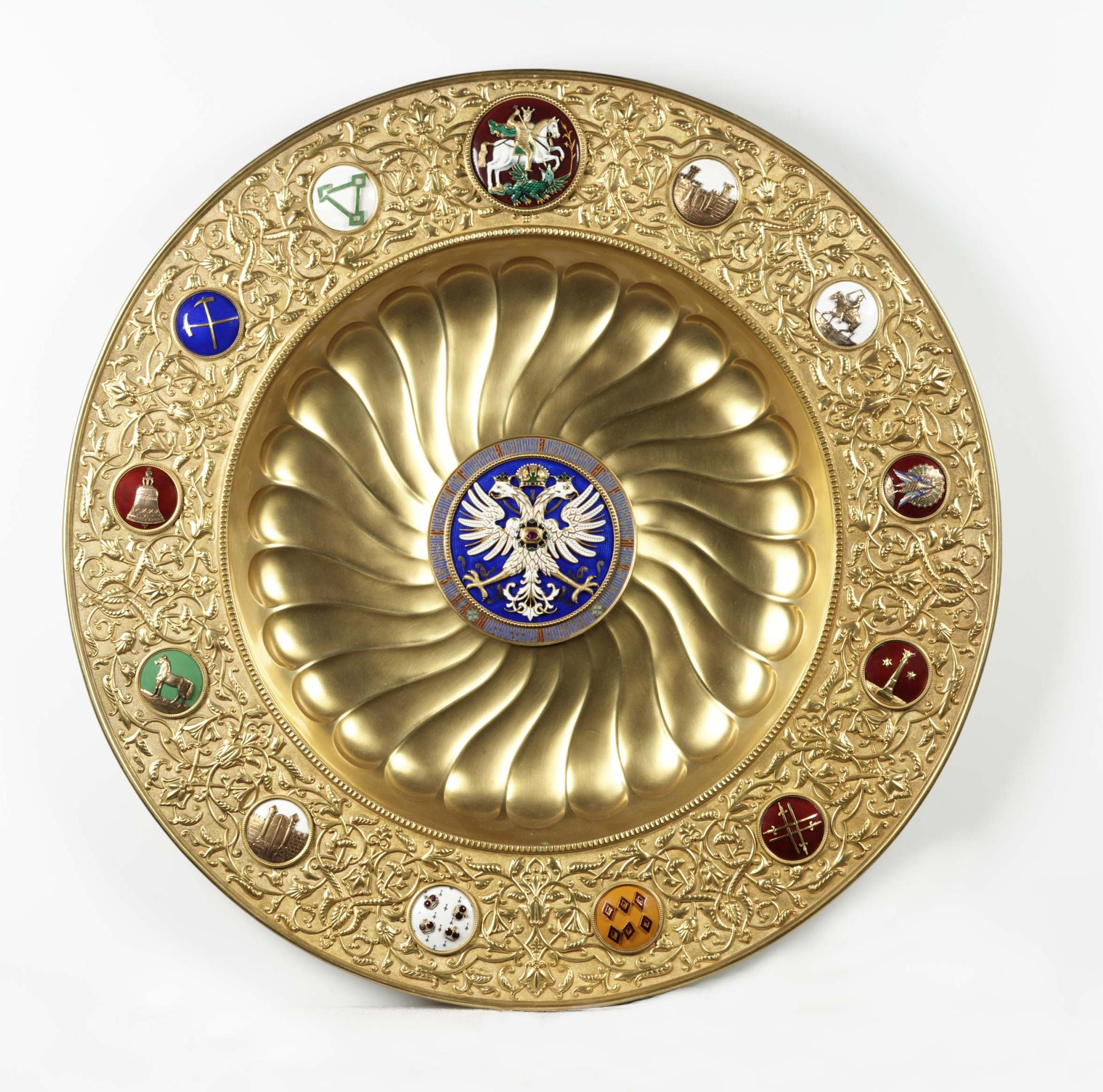
Dish celebrating the 1881 coronation of Emperor Alexander Alexandrovich and Empress Maria Feodorovna, bearing the enamelled armorials of thirteen Russian cities

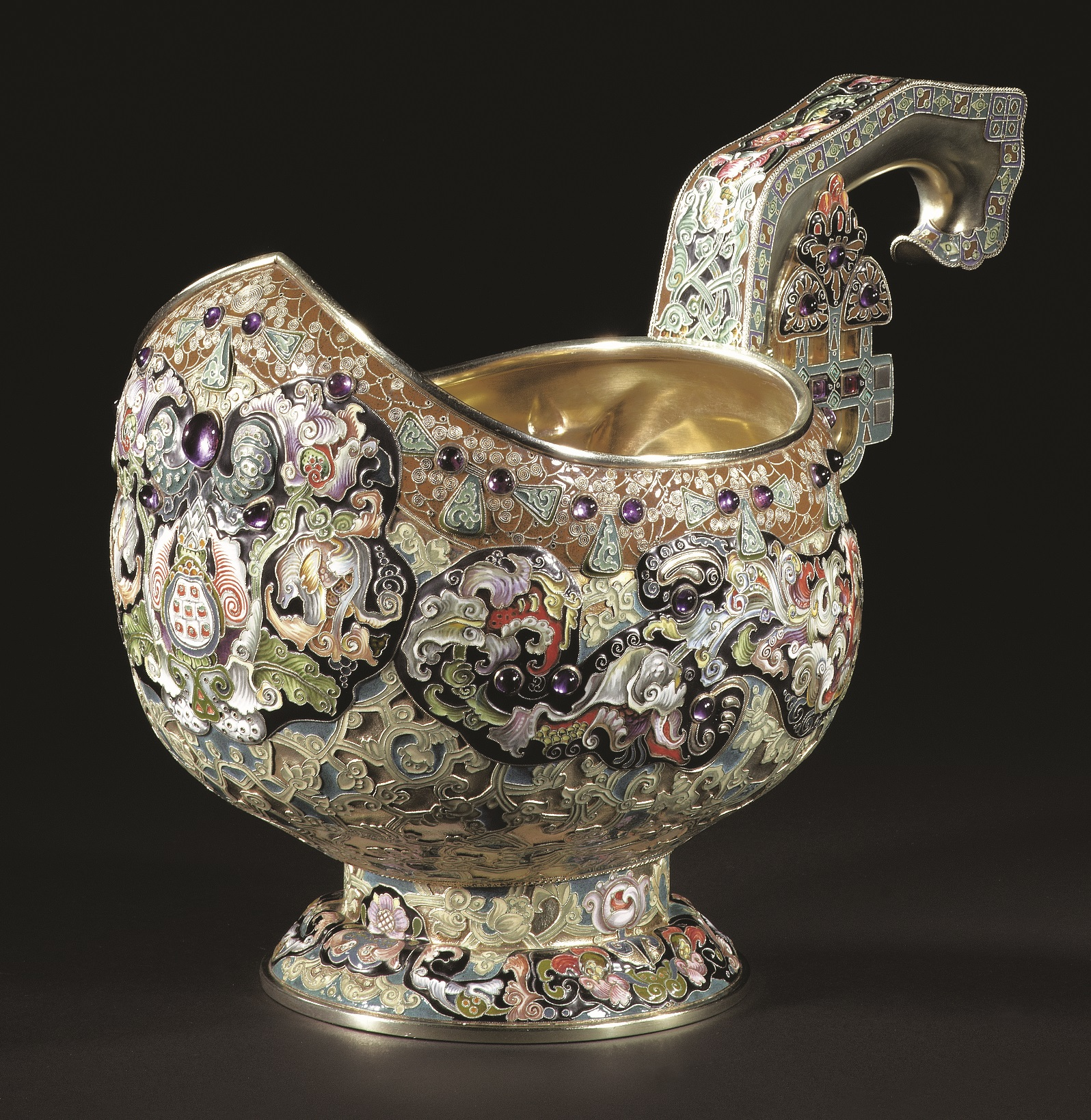
Large kovsh by Feodor Rückert, Moscow, between 1899 and 1908

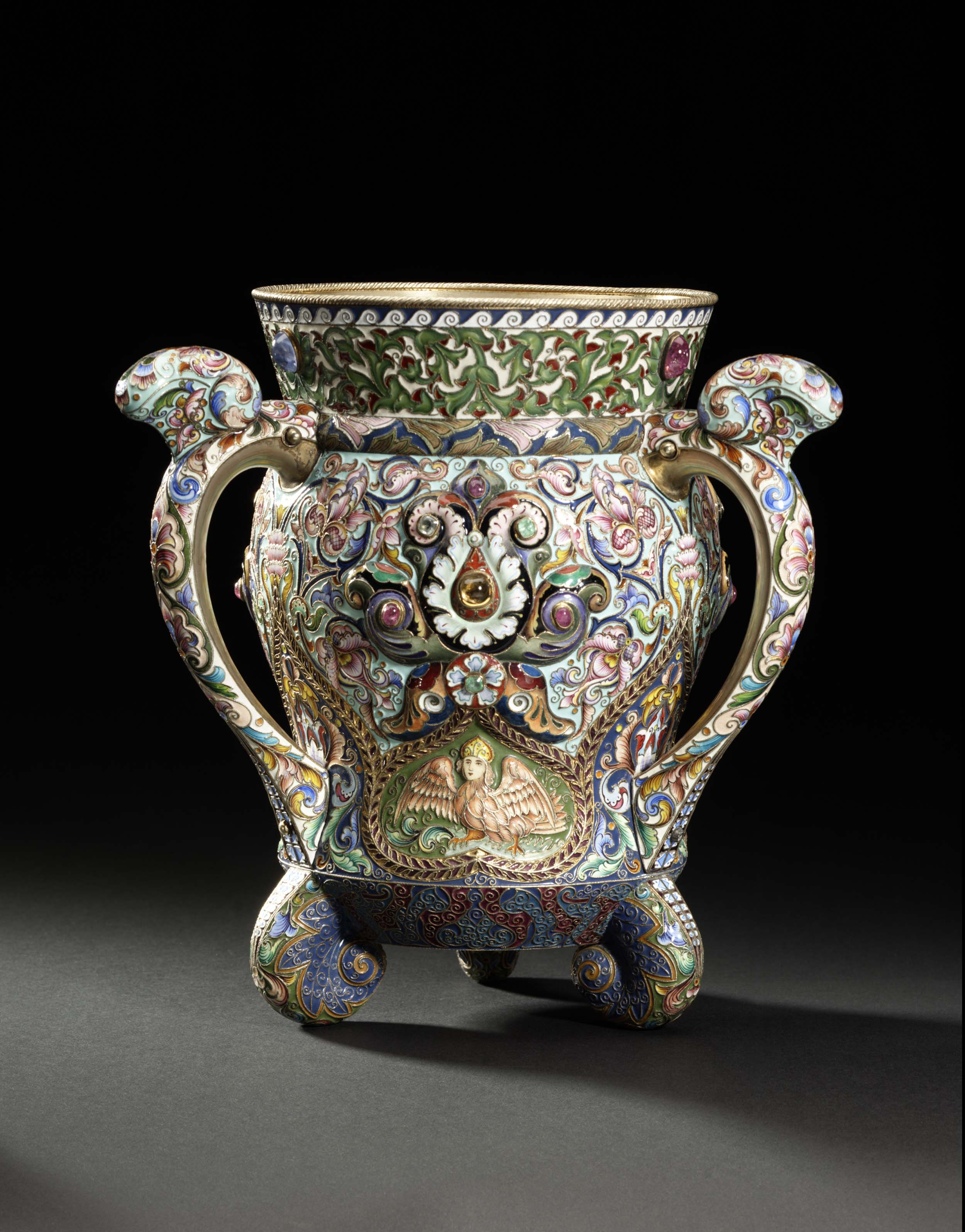
Loving cup, Moscow, between 1899 and 1908

=== Islamic works ===
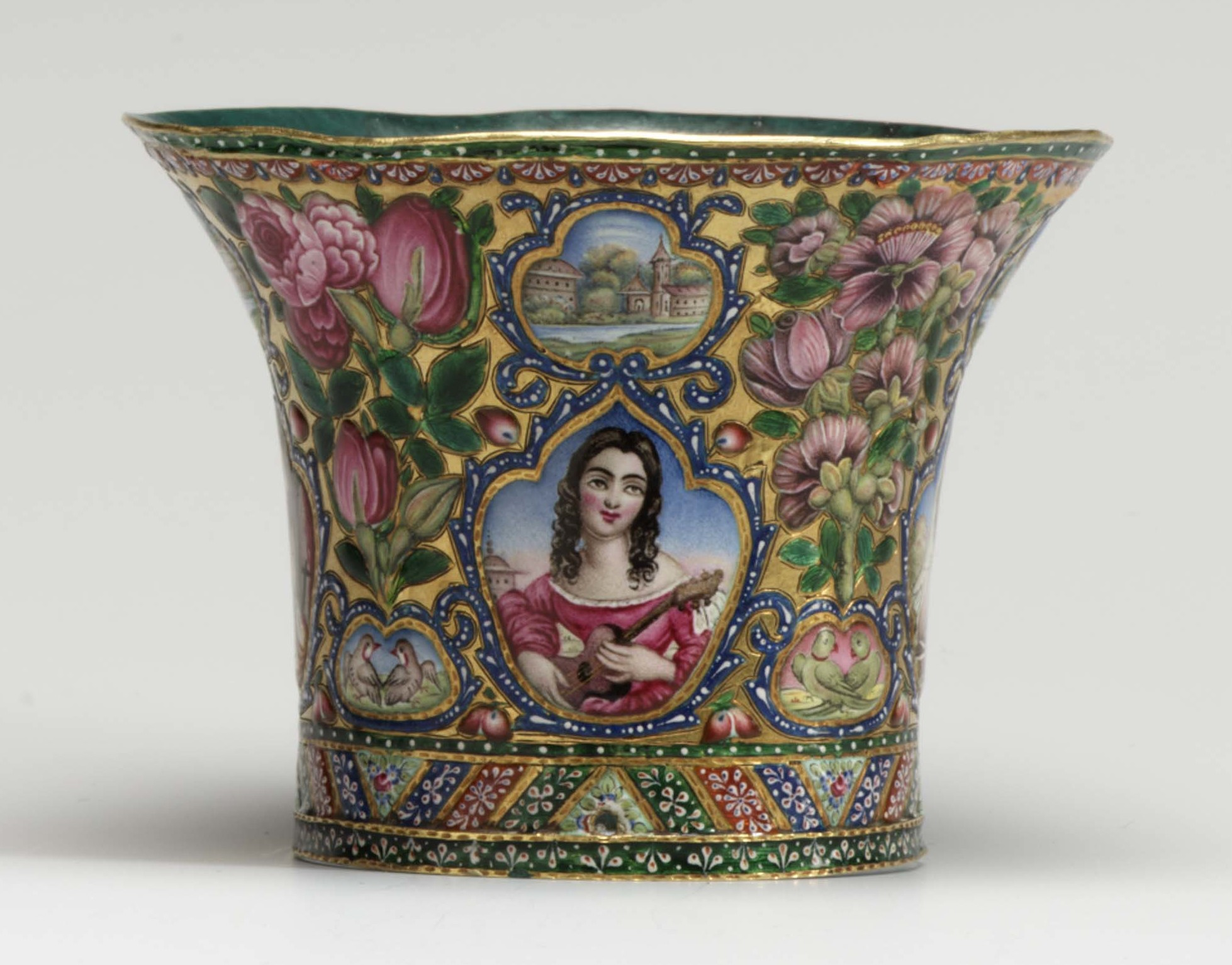
Hookah cup, Iran, c.1860

At the start of the Islamic calendar in 622 AD, artisans of the Byzantine Empire were already making high quality enamels. Byzantine emperors gave luxury items to Muslim rulers in the 10th and 11th centuries and these would often be decorated with cloisonné. The influence of Byzantine art is visible in objects from the Fatimid Caliphate, Egypt, Syria, and Muslim Iberia. The historian Jack Ogden has argued Iran was producing champlevé enamelwork by the 14th or 15th century, but very few examples survive.

Champlevé enamel flourished in the Mughal Empire, especially during the reign of Shah Jahan in the 17th century, where it was used for personal jewellery, luxury objects and containers including hookahs. In the 19th century, Jaipur was known for enamels rivalling those of Europe or Iran, especially red transparent enamels, while Lucknow was known for blues and greens and Benares for painted enamels. Delhi and Calcutta also produced enamels but seem not to have had their own regional style. The Jaipur red enamel is exemplified in the collection by an ornamental dagger with scabbard and by a gold necklace. In the Mughal period, enamel was only used to decorate functional objects, but in the 19th century purely decorative enamel wares were produced. The collection includes both kinds of object. A silver Landau carriage in the collection was commissioned in 1915 by Bhavsinhji II, Maharaja of Bhavnagar and was kept by his family until 1968 for use in special events.

Enamel production in Iran dates from at least the early Safavid period in the 14th century and flourished during the Qajar period (1785–1914), whose artisans had a strong preference for gold as a base. Niccolao Manucci, an Italian writer and traveller who visited the Safavid court in 1655, noted Shah Abbas II employed a team of French enamellers and supervised their work. By the late 17th century there was an official position of Court enameller. By the end of the 18th century Iranian enamellers had mastered painted enamel, and were adding it to a wide variety of items for ordinary citizens as well as for royalty. The collection has several items from the Qajar period, including a silver-gilt hookah with portraits of people in Iranian and Western dress.

By the turn of the 20th century, the court of Ottoman Turkey had adopted the European convention of gifting decorative objects, with relevant emblems, as marks of favour. An example in the collection is a brooch with the name of Abdul Hamid II spelled out in diamonds. The collection has some objects commissioned by the Ottoman Empire from European artists. These include snuff boxes from Geneva and Paris depicting Mahmud II and a Bosporus landscape, one bearing the name of Muhammad Ali of Egypt in diamonds.

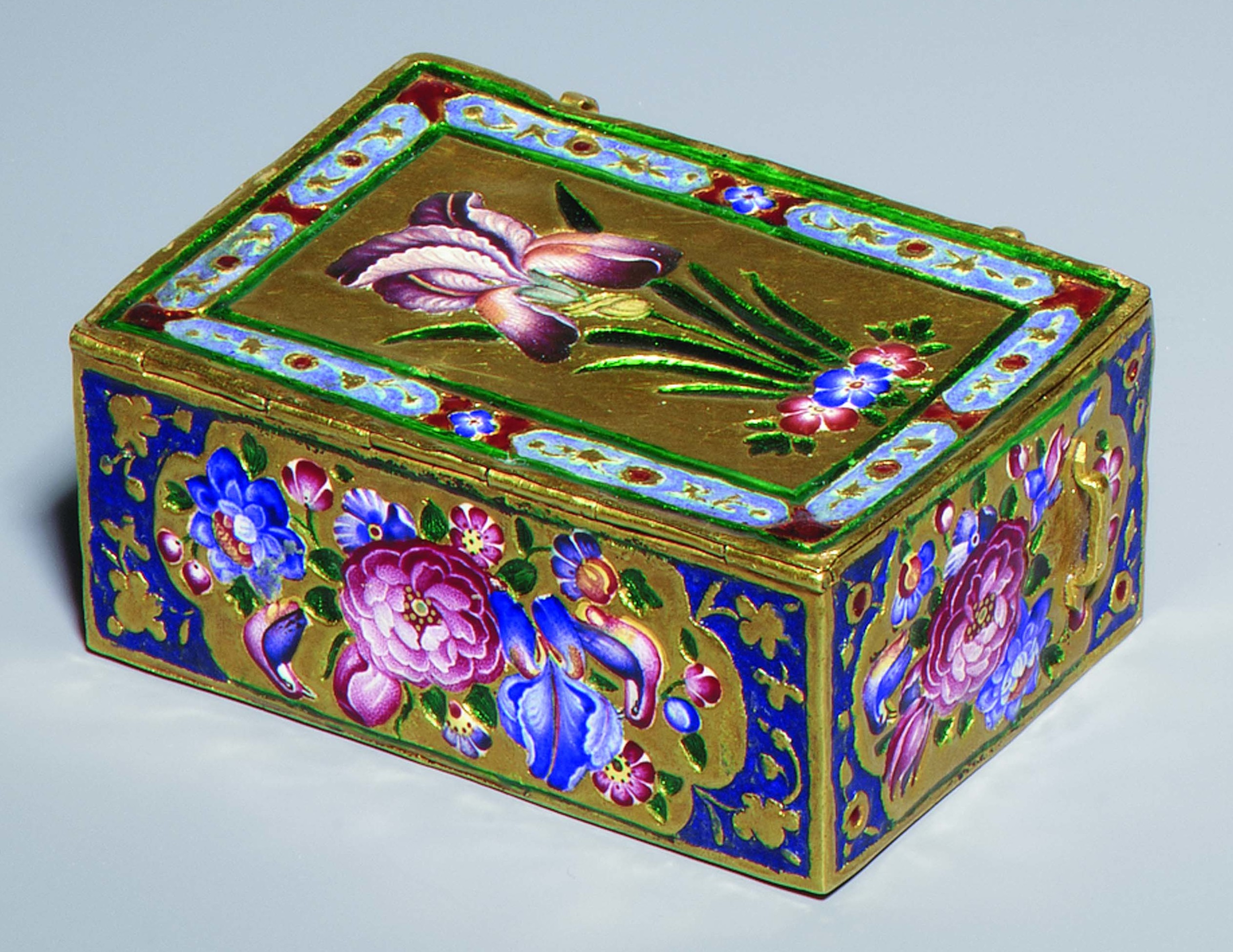
Box, Iran, 19th century

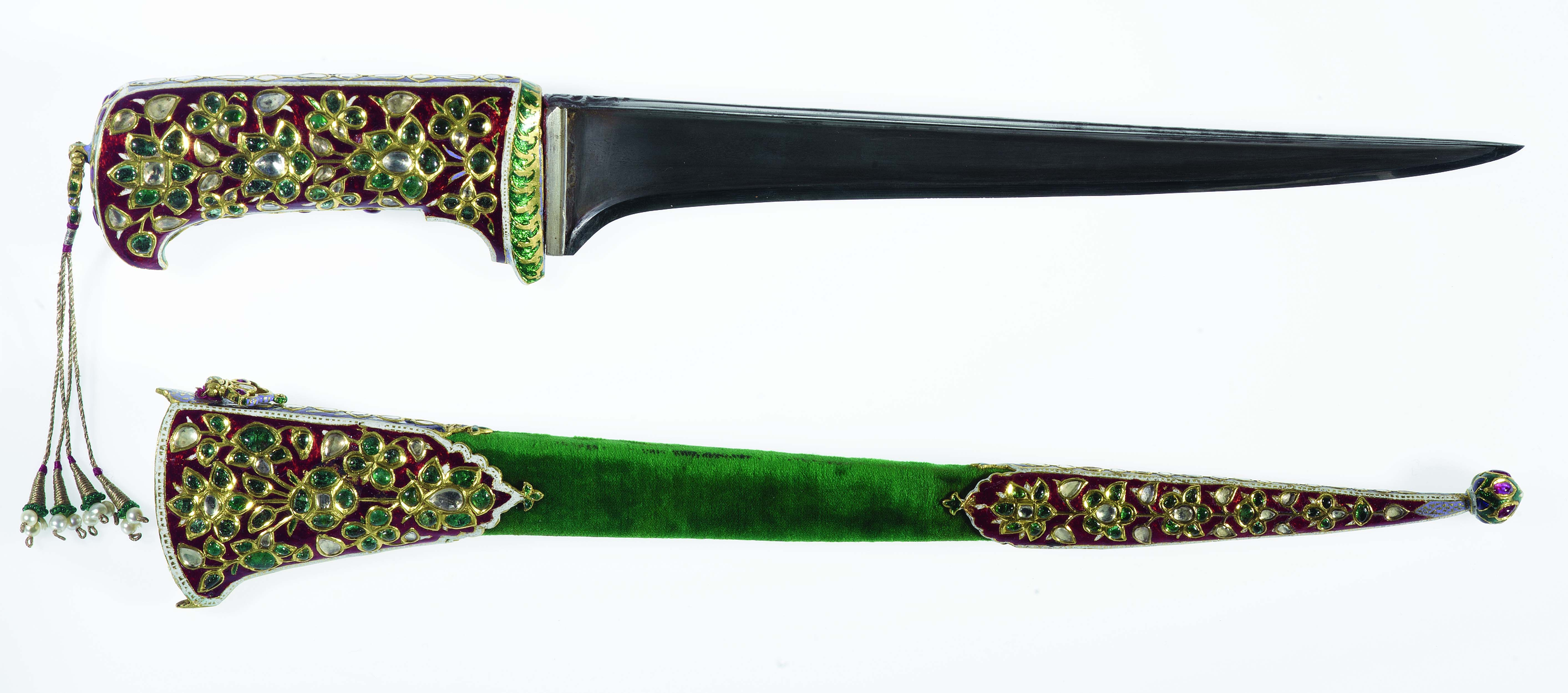
Dagger and scabbard in gold with precious stones, Jaipur, 19th century

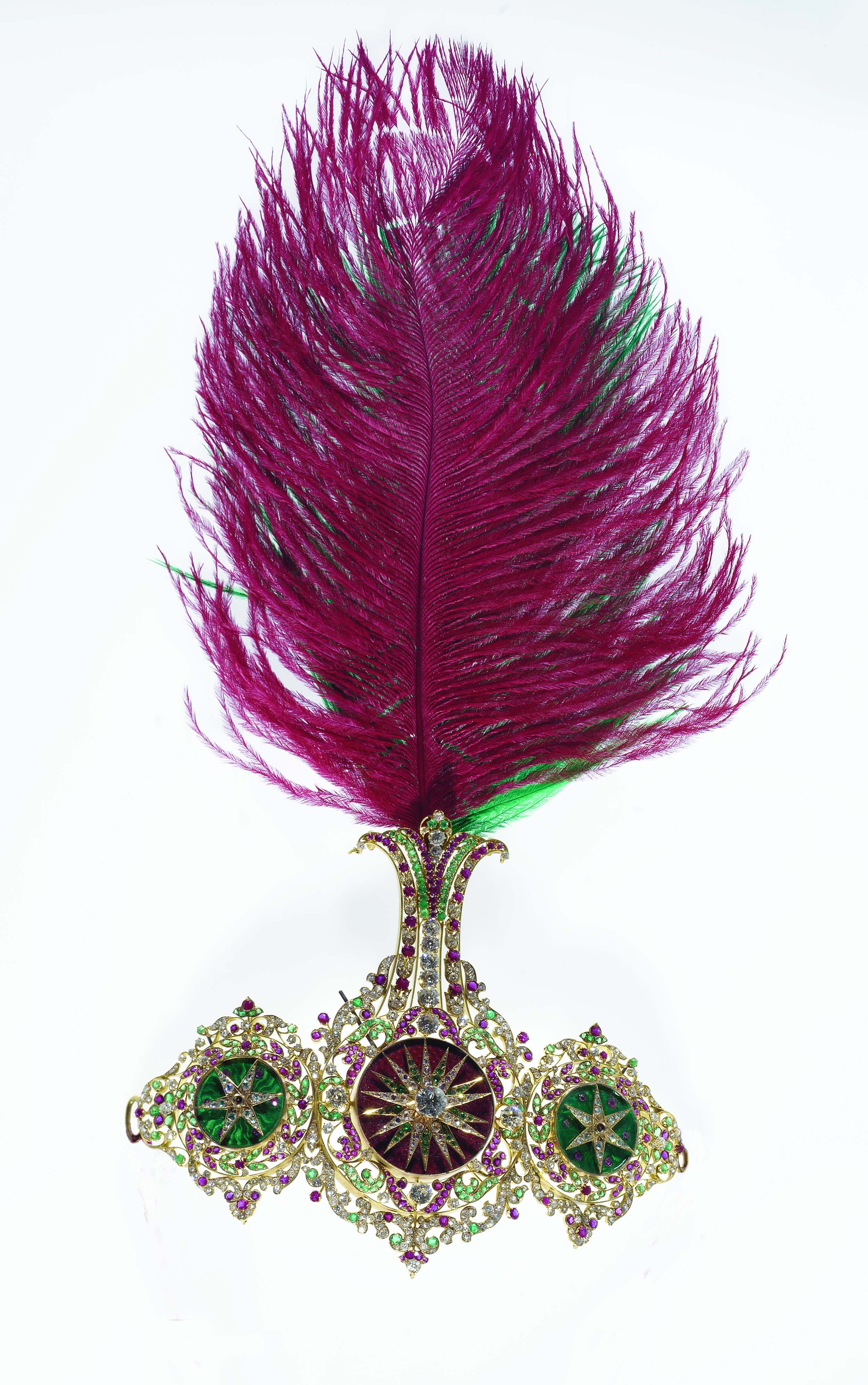
Head ornament, Turkey, c.1900

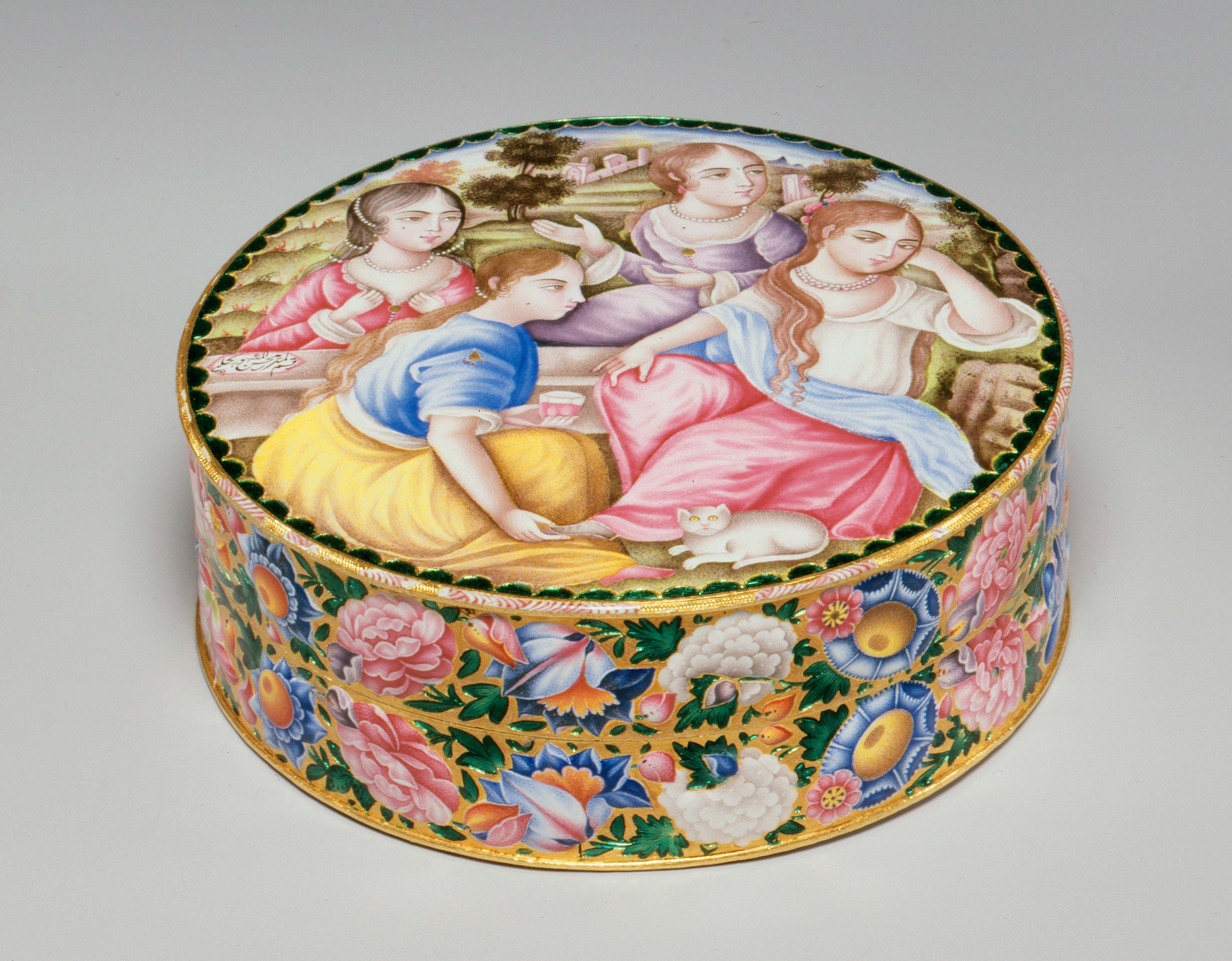
Box, Iran, c.1900

=== Japanese works ===
Japanese artists did not start producing cloisonné enamel until the 1830s, coinciding with the sharp fall in the Shogun's power, and followed by the Meiji Revolution, but their techniques advanced quickly. By the 1870s, enamel art works were being exhibited at national exhibitions and at world's fairs. From 1870 to 1900, the form went through a very rapid evolution which introduced translucent colours, dark black backgrounds, and smoother surfaces without cracks or pitting. New techniques included moriage ("piling up") which places layers of enamel upon each other to create a three-dimensional effect, shōtai-jippō or plique-à-jour which creates panels of transparent or semi-transparent enamel, and uchidashi (repoussé), in which the metal foundation is hammered outwards to create a relief effect. "Wire-less" cloisonné or musen-jippō was introduced by Kawade Shibatarō and taken up by other artists. Namikawa Sōsuke created pictorial enamel works so similar to paintings they were shown in the painting section of the Japan–British Exhibition, rather than the craft section. The period from 1890 to 1910 was known as the "Golden age" of Japanese enamels. At this point they were regarded as unequalled in the world in their breadth of designs and colours.

The collection includes works by, among other cloisonné artists, Namikawa Sōsuke, Namikawa Yasuyuki, Ando Jubei, and Hattori Tadasaburō all of whom were appointed Imperial Household Artists. It also includes works by Kawade Shibatarō who, like the others, is also represented in the Khalili Collection of Japanese Art. Some vases bear the sixteen-petaled chrysanthemum seal of the Imperial family, indicating they were commissioned as presentation wares. The musen hidden-wire technique is evident on some items and others have the distinctive black background Namikawa Yasuyuki was known for. The moriage relief technique is visible on a vase by Kawade Shibatarō. Hayashi Kodenji, Kawaguchi Bunzaemon, and Kumeno Teitaro are other artists represented.

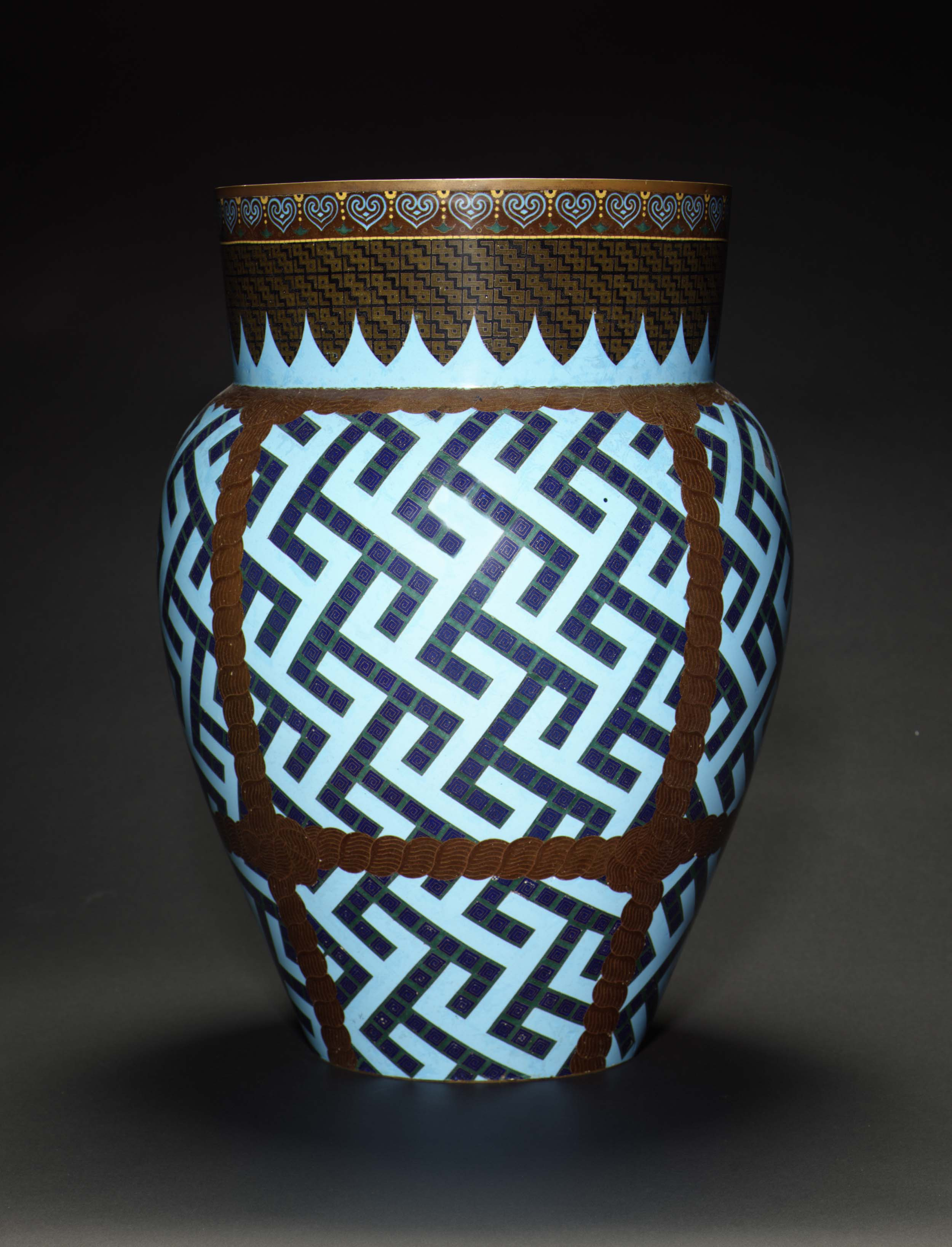
Vase, Nagoya, c.1877

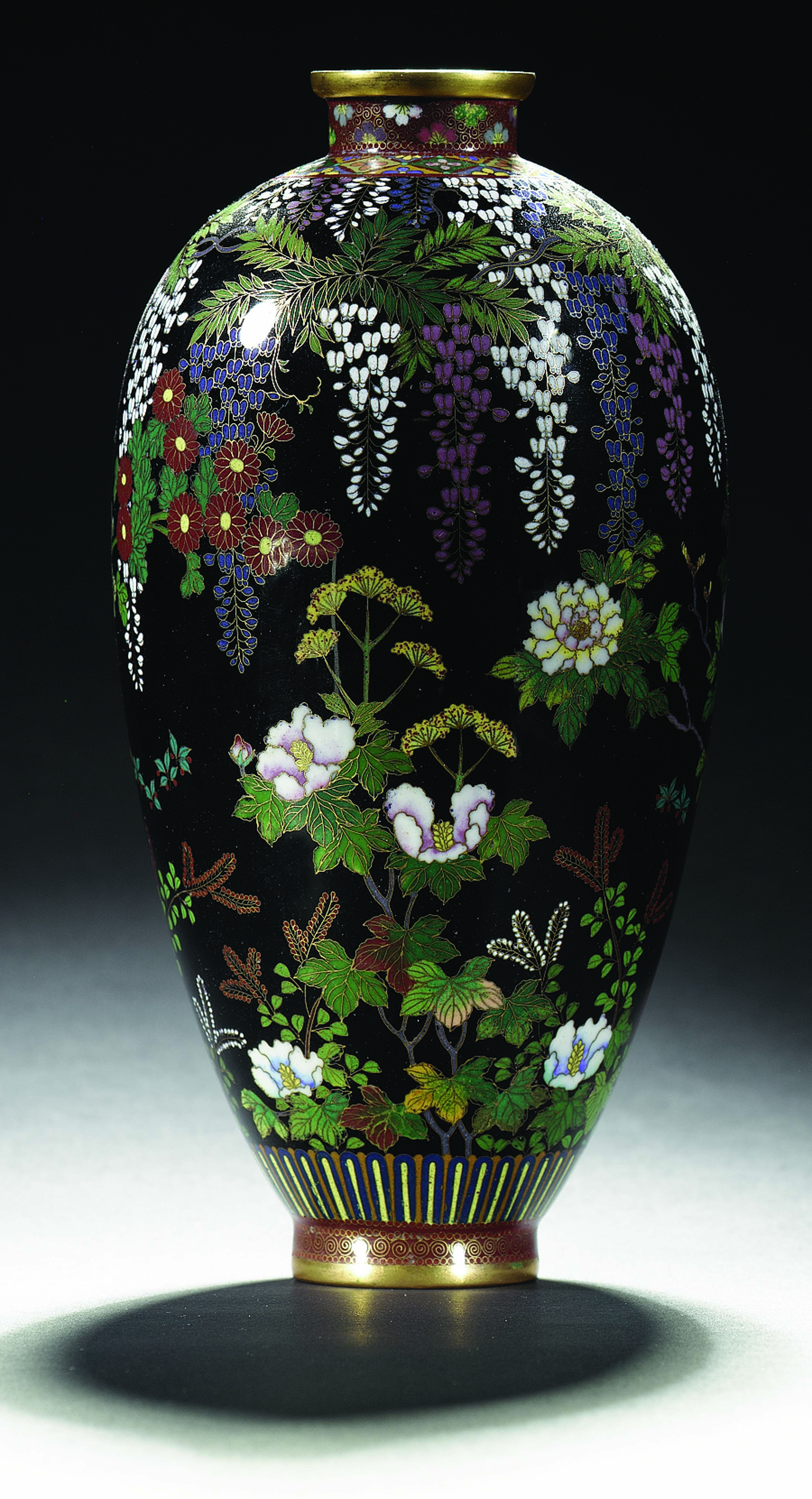
Vase, Kyoto, late 19th century

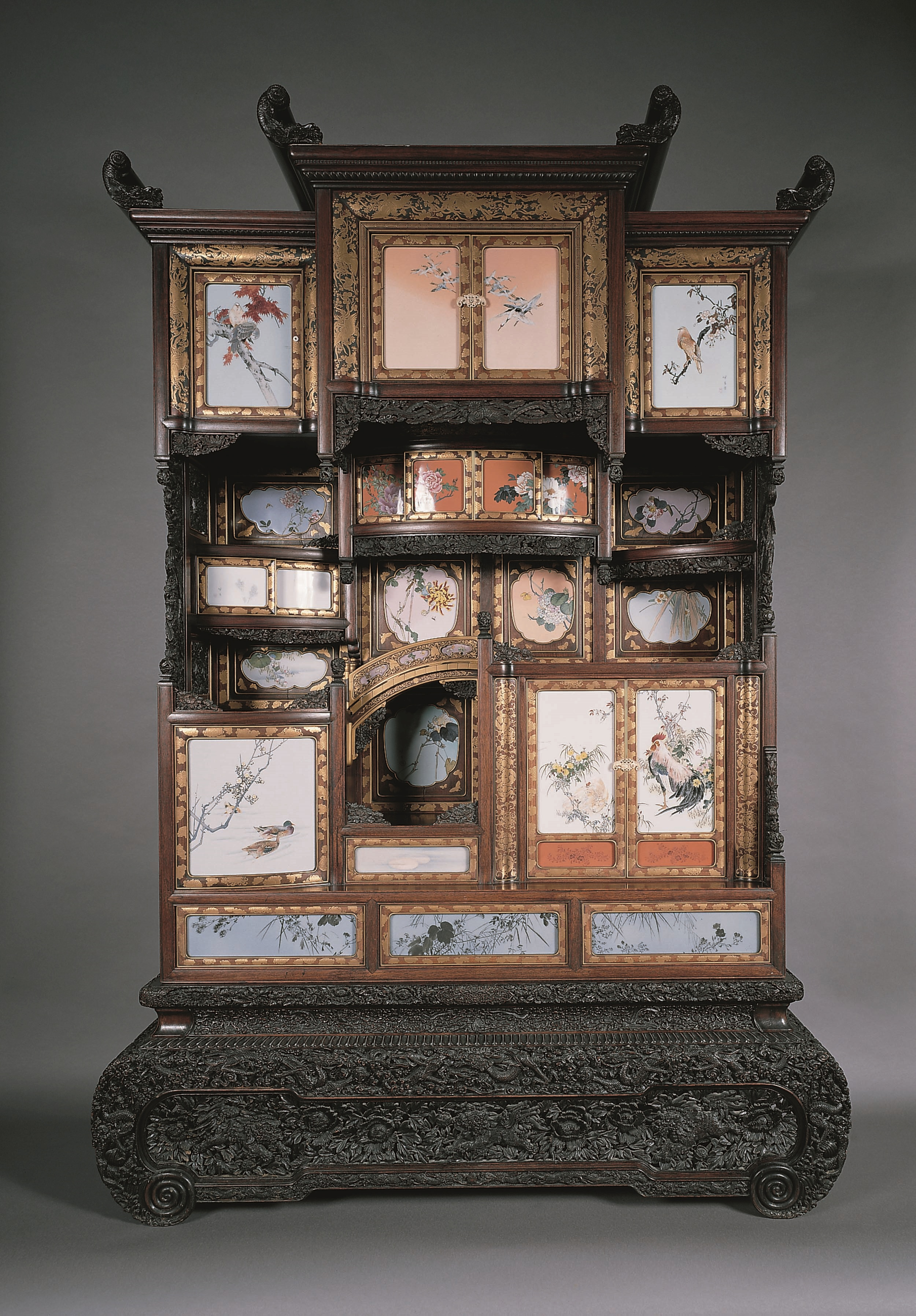
Cabinet holding 32 enamel panels, Tokyo, c.1895

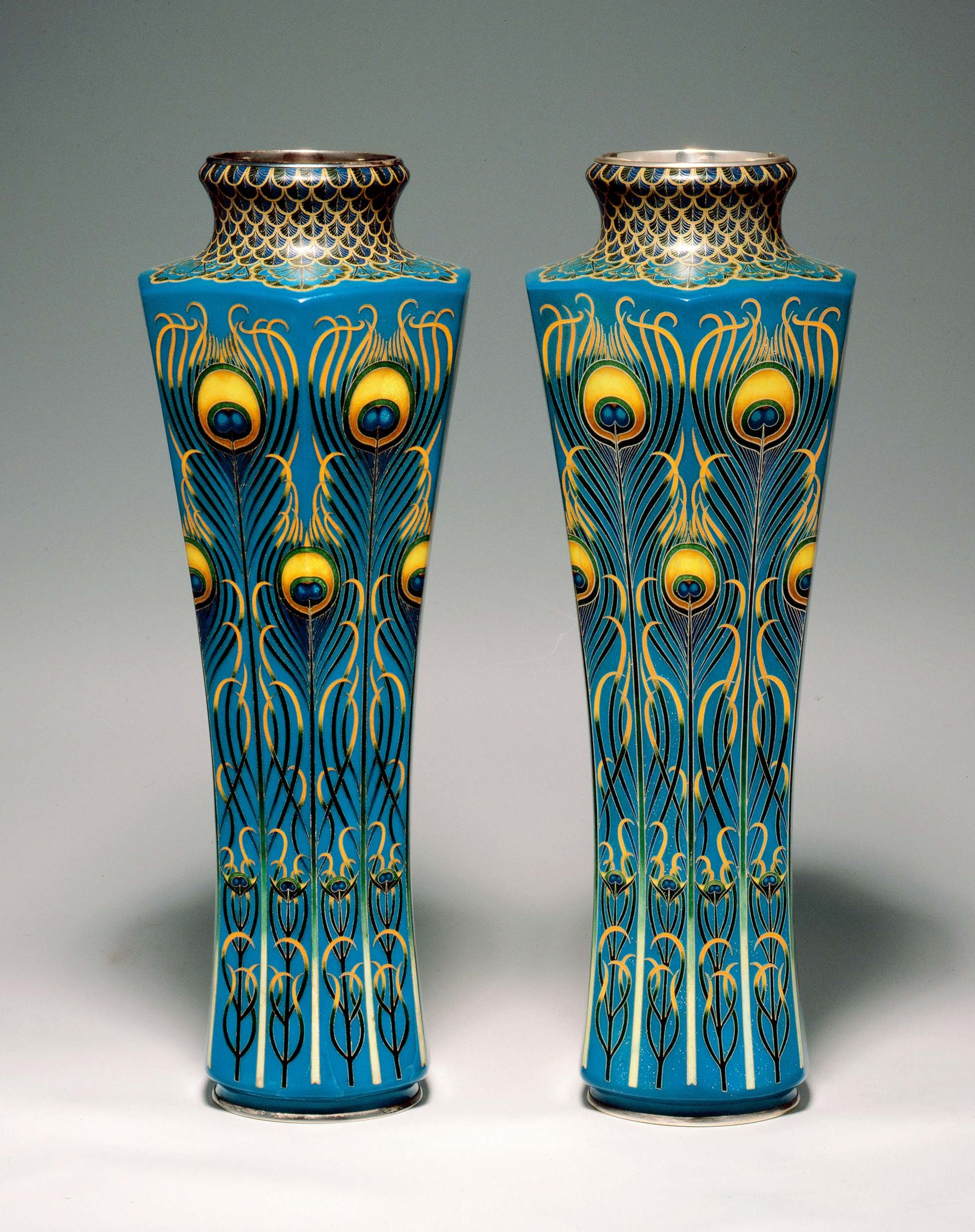
Vases attributed to Kawade Shibatarō, c.1910

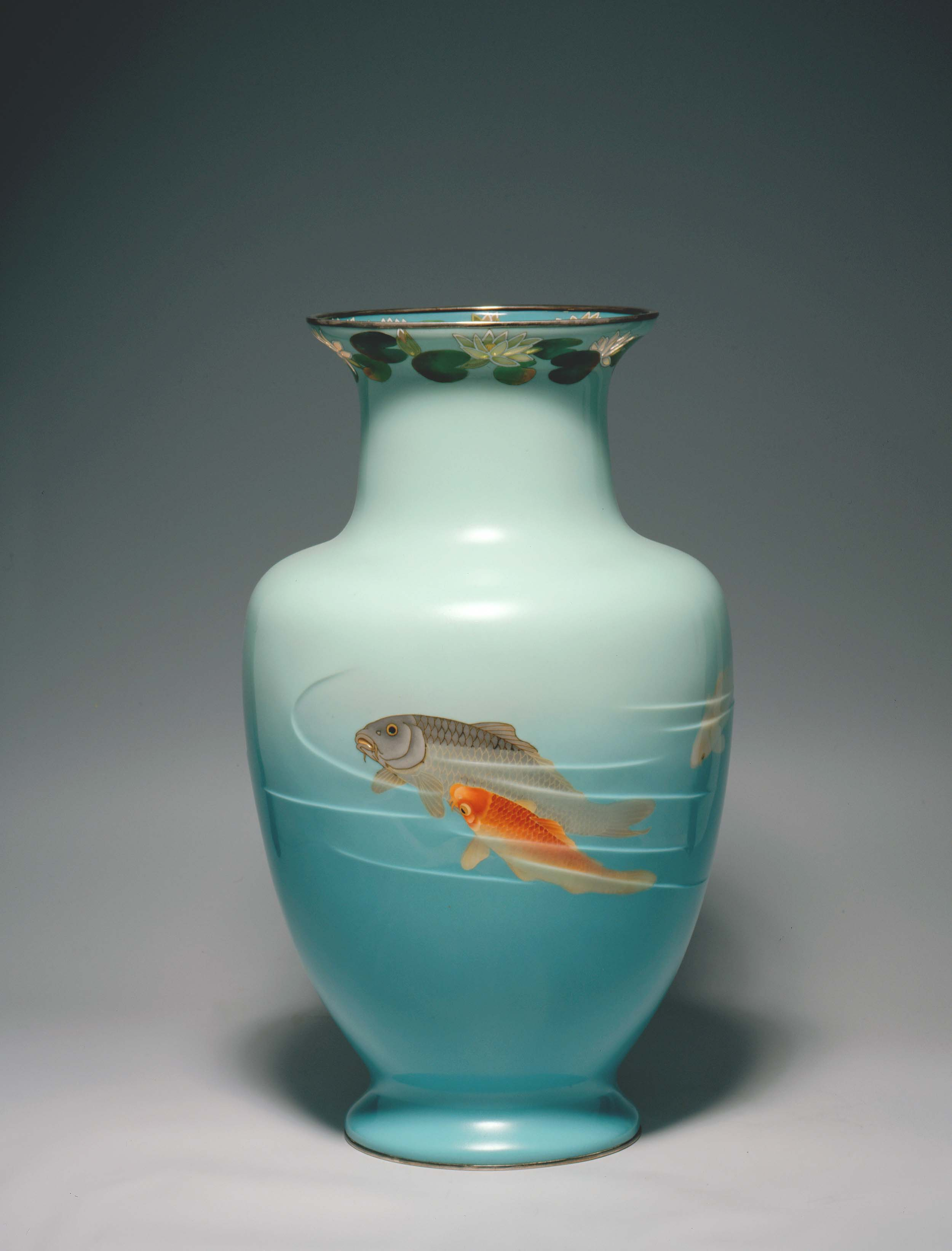
Vase by Gonda Hirosuke, Nagoya, c.1915

=== Chinese works ===
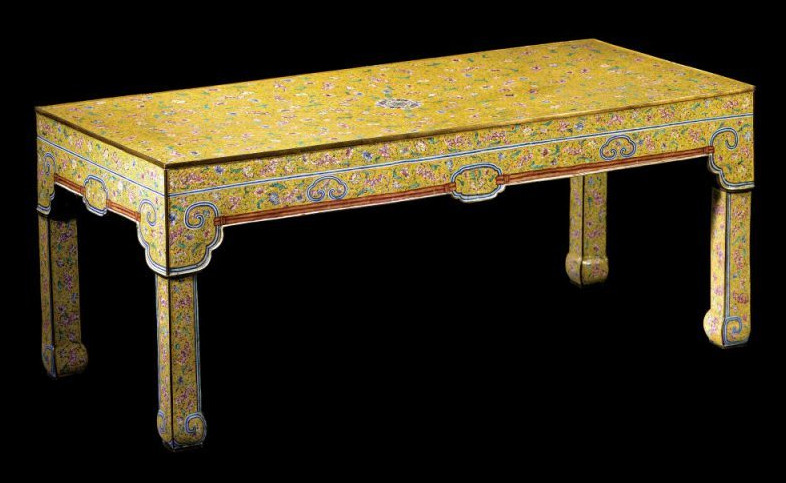
Painted enamel throne table with the seal mark of the Qianlong emperor

Cloisonné enamels on copper surfaces have been made in China since at least the early 15th century, building on a tradition of fired enamels that goes back much further. After its introduction, the technique developed rapidly. During the Qing dynasty, enamel artists used thinner wires and fired the enamel without pitting or bubbles, greatly improving on previous Chinese cloisonné. They also introduced a wider range of colours. From 1720 onwards, pink, white and yellow enamel overglazes were used on porcelain, cloisonné, and painted enamels. Cloisonné works included objects created for temples or for the imperial court.

The Chinese enamels in the Khalili collection date from the late Qing dynasty onwards. They include items made for temple altars, such as incense burners and candlesticks. Among the imperial works is a throne table, 90.5 centimetres (just under three feet) long, made for the Qianlong Emperor and bearing his seal. It is painted in fine detail with motifs of lotus and flying bats on a background of imperial yellow. Evenly firing such a large object would have presented a challenge, so the colourful and consistent result illustrates the skill of the Guangzhou workshops where it was made. Another imperial commission in the collection is a wall panel of a springtime landscape, with a poem by Yu Minzhong. A set of eight wall panels, 132 centimetres (52 inches) high and each featuring a different plant, illustrates the progress of the seasons. Each bears a Yu Minzhong poem, probably written as calligraphy and then converted to enamel.

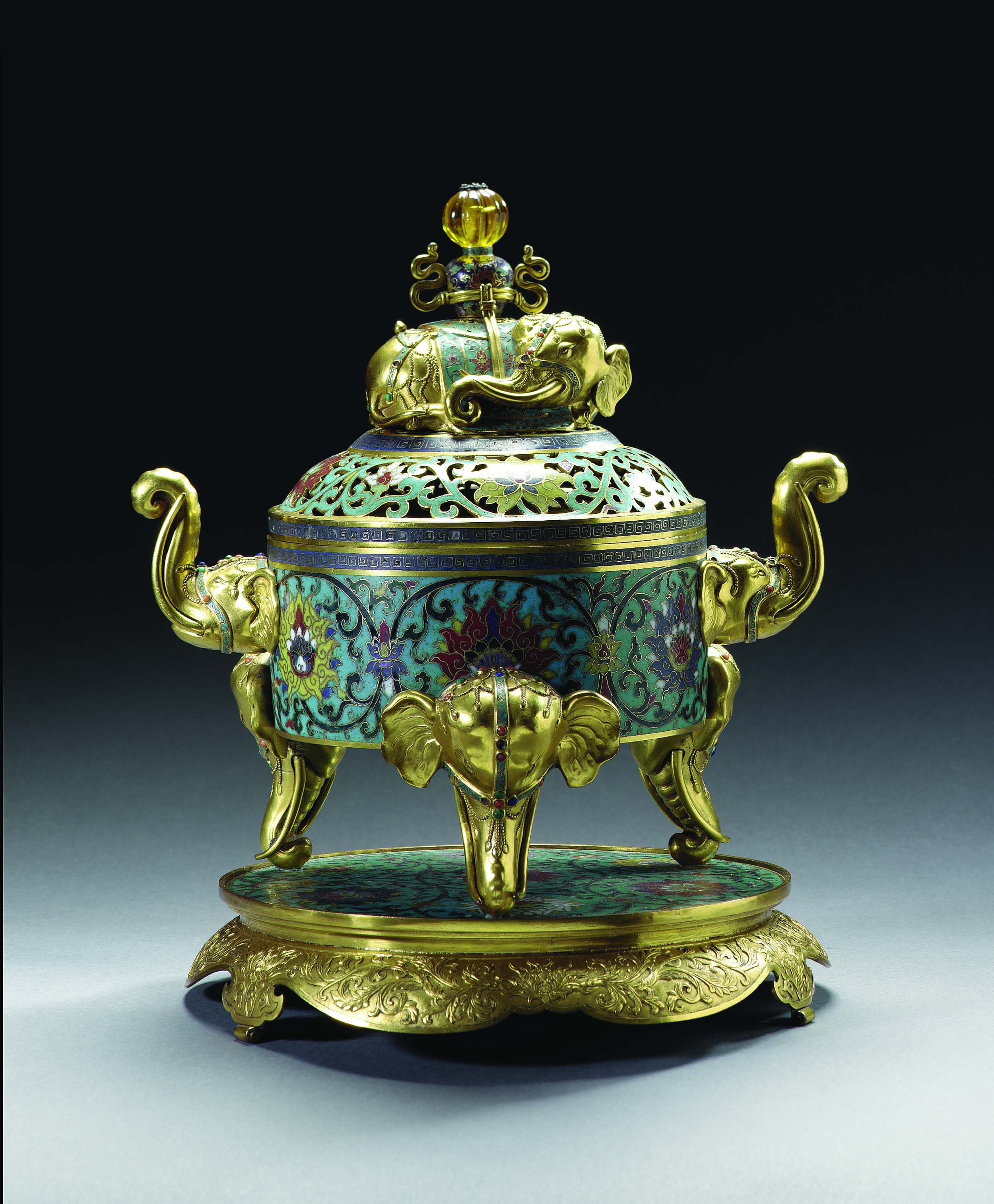
Incense burner with cover and stand, from between 1662 and 1722

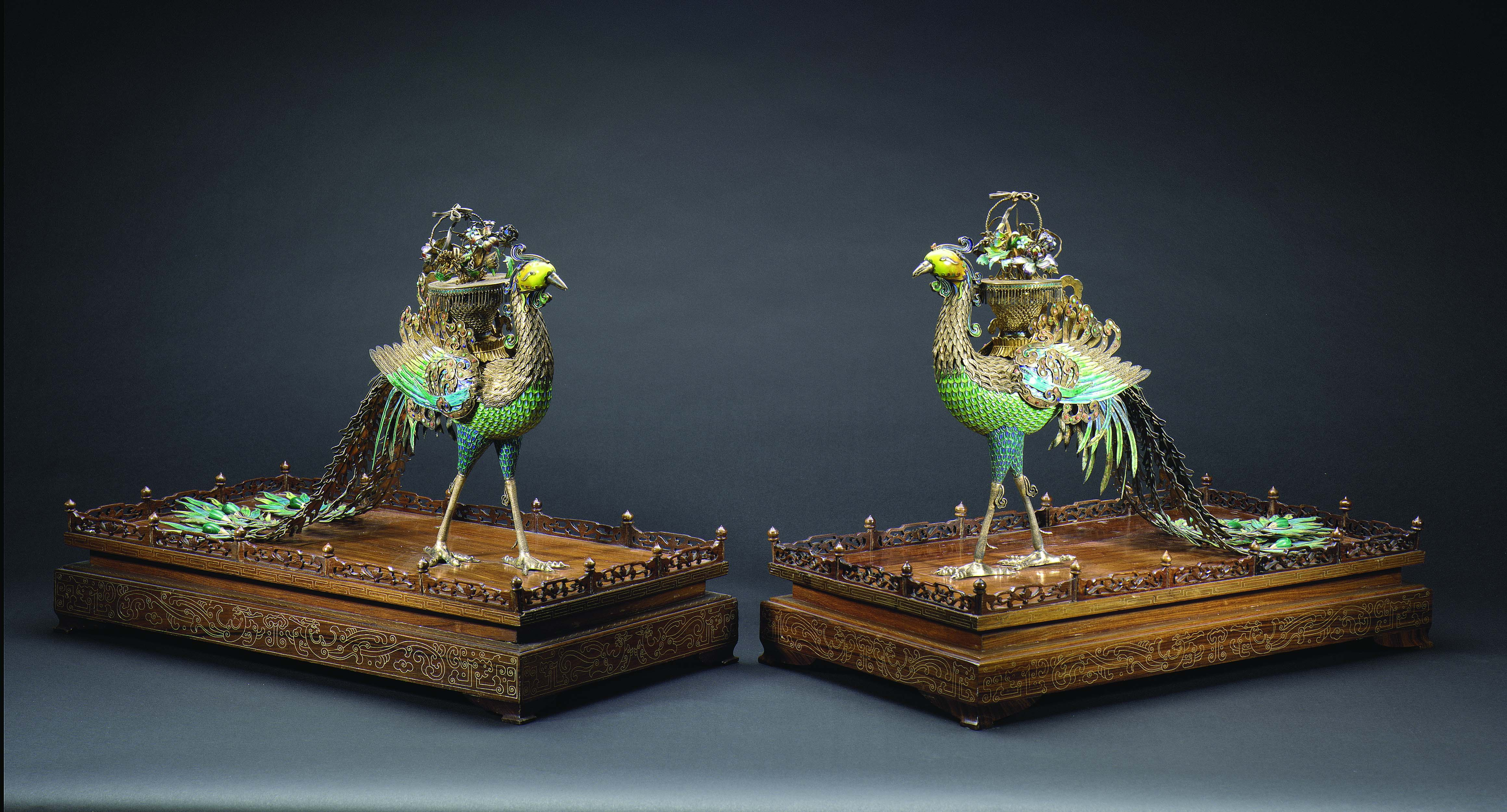
Pair of phoenixes, between 1736 and 1795

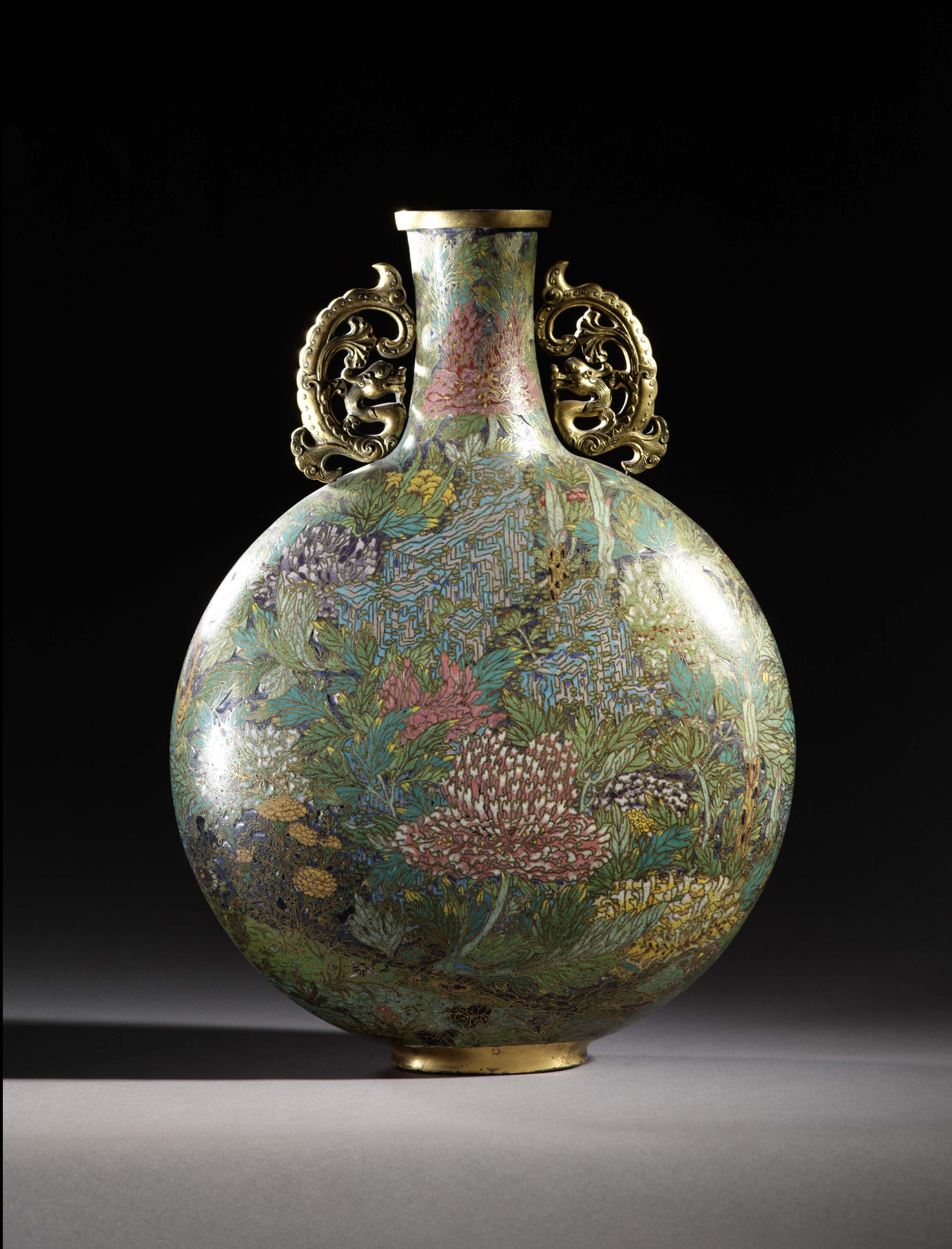
Pilgrim flask from between 1736 and 1795

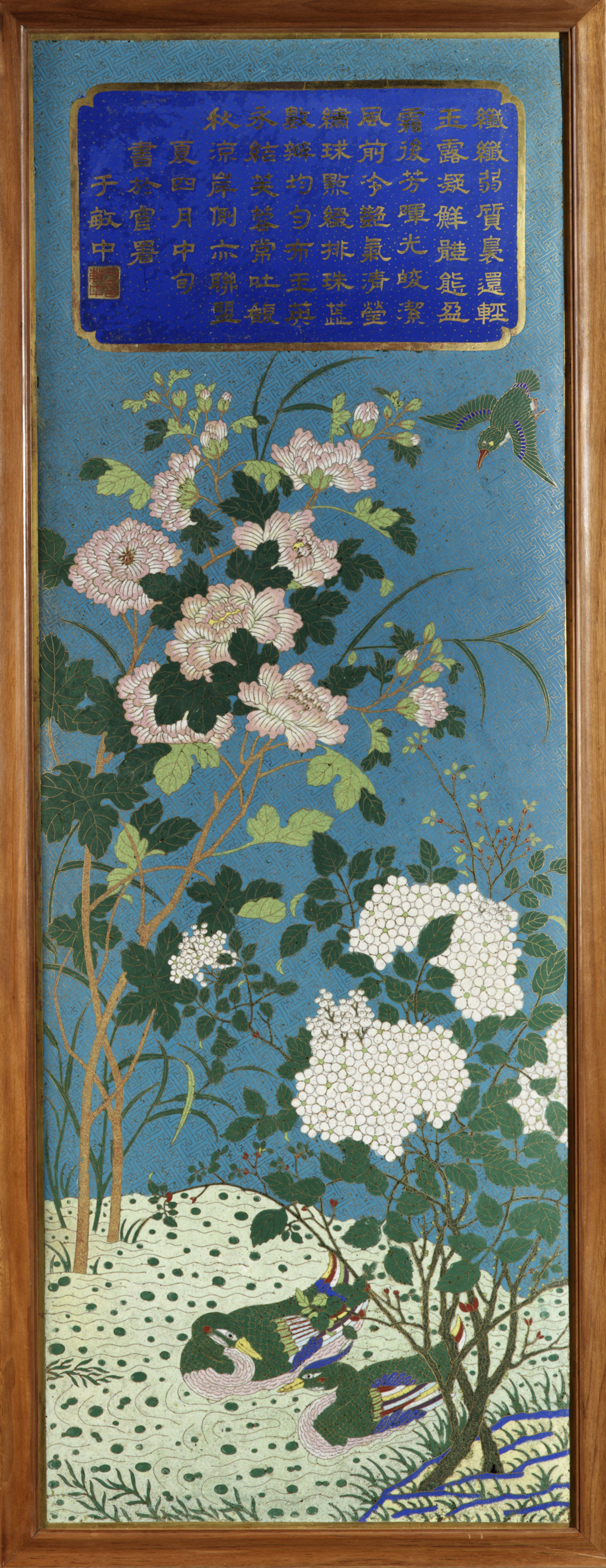
Panel from a set of eight bearing poems by Yu Minzong

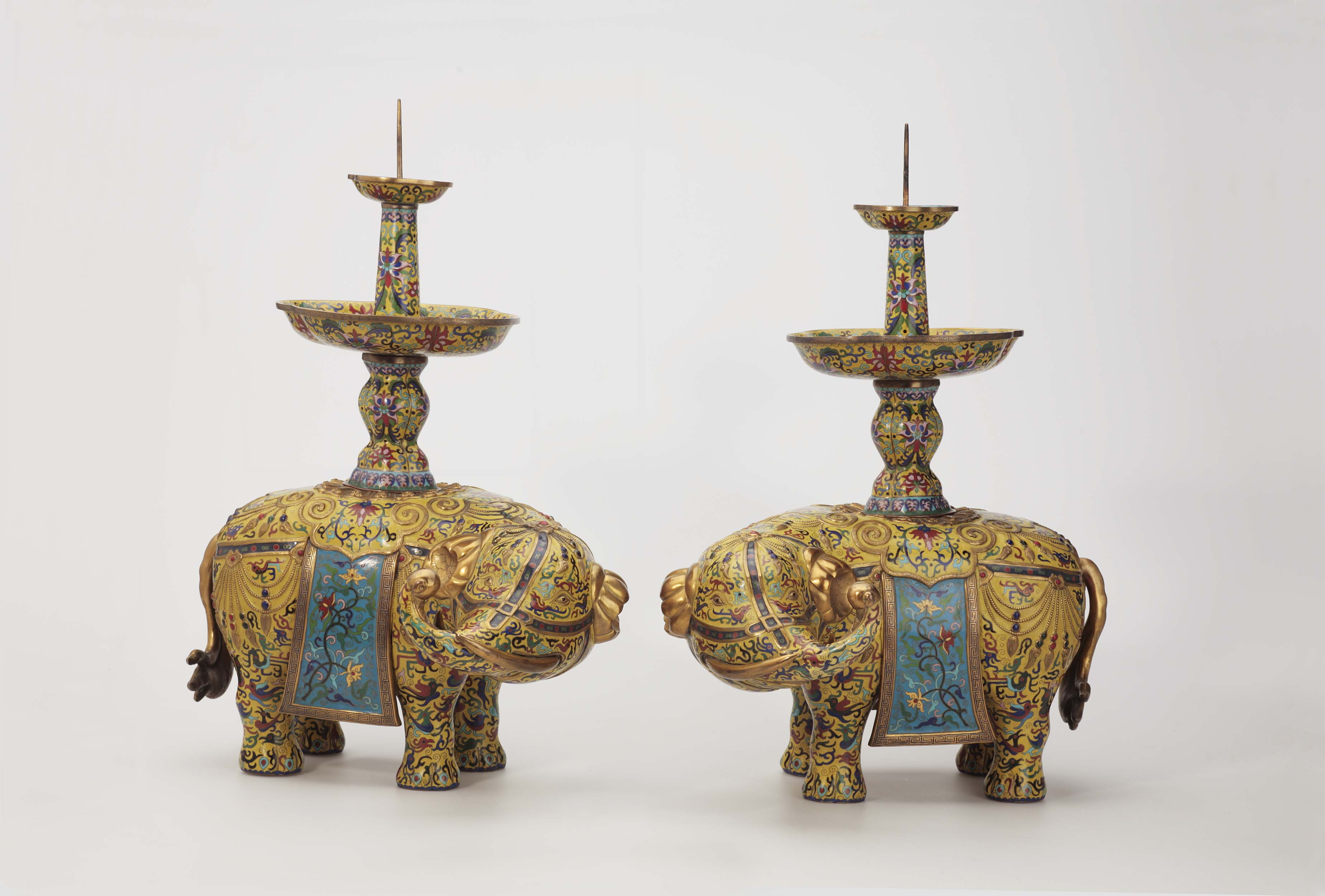
Pair of altar candlesticks, 19th century

== Exhibitions ==
A selection of 320 objects from the collection formed the exhibition "Enamels of the World 1700–2000 from the Khalili Collection" from December 2009 to April 2010 at the State Hermitage Museum, St Petersburg, Russia. The museum director Mikhail Piotrovsky wrote that the collection "includes spectacular masterpieces from all the major centres of enamelling" and "reveals the remarkable technical achievements of the enamellers[.]" Art dealer Geoffrey Munn described the diversity of the exhibition as "astounding", observing Khalili "hasn’t followed the clichéd routes of enamel."
