= Feodor Rückert =

Russian silver- and goldsmith (1840–1917)

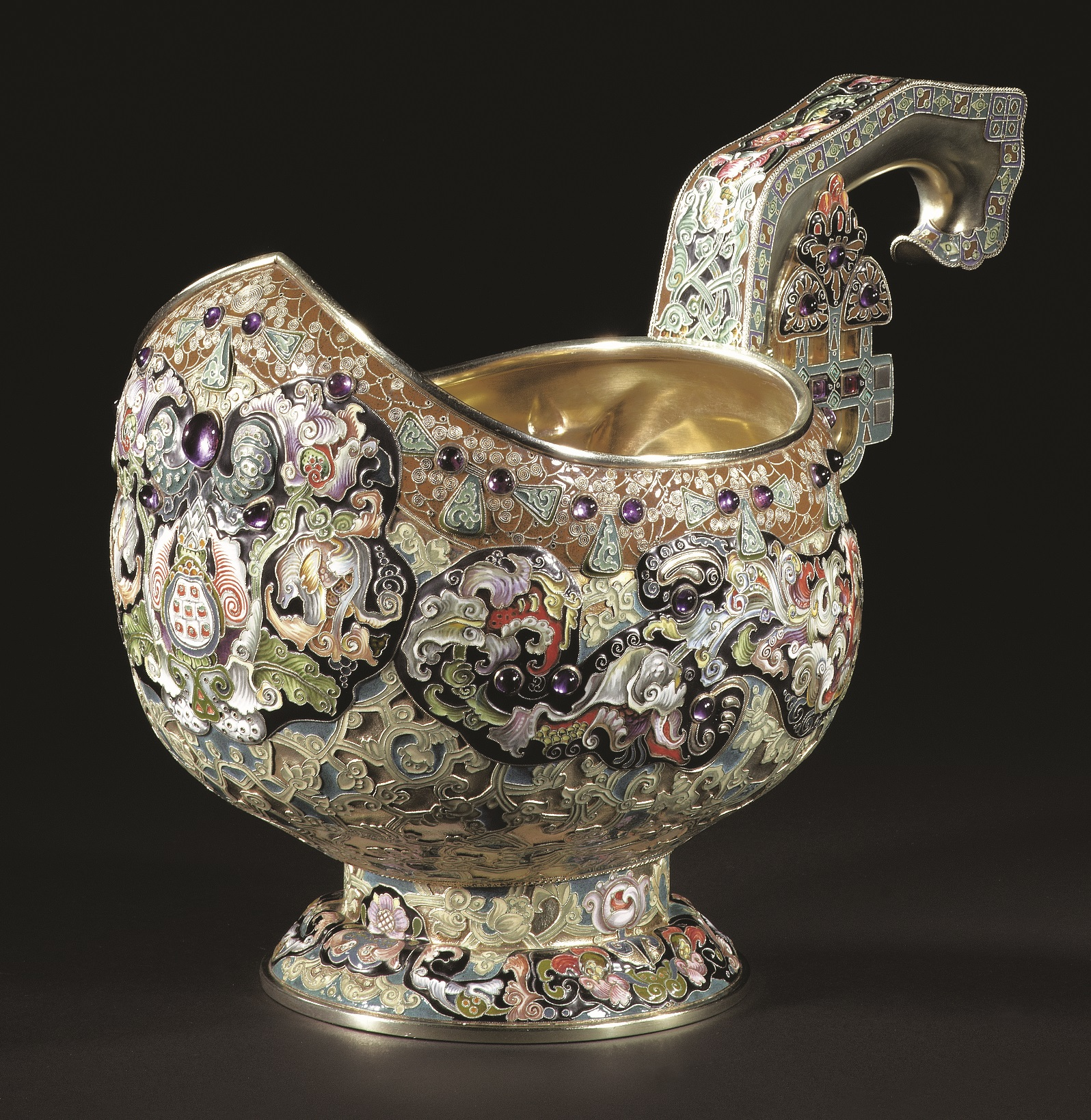
Kovsh by Rückert, 1899–1908, from the Khalili Collection of Enamels of the World

Feodor Ivanovich Rückert (Russian: Фёдор Иванович Рюкерт, romanized: Fyodor Ivanovich Ryukert; German: Friedrich Moritz Rückert; 1851 in Liegnitz – 1918 in Moscow) was a silversmith, goldsmith, and Fabergé workmaster of German origin. At just fourteen, Rückert emigrated to Russia and began working for the aristocratic Yusupov family.

Friedrich Moritz Rückert was born on October 31, 1851 in Liegnitz, in Prussian Silesia. Before leaving for Russia, on November 13, 1873, he married Laura Ida Amalia Holmann, in the small town Hermsdorf. He began his career as an enameler at the crystal factory of Count Vasily Alexandrovich Olsufiev (1831-1883) in the village of Maryinsky, Roslavlsky Uyezd, Smolensk Governorate, where he presumably worked until the end of the 1870s.

In 1886, he established his own workshop at 29 Vorontsovskaya Street in Moscow. In 1887, Ruckert began working with Russian jeweller and Fabergé egg maker, Carl Fabergé. His mark Ф.Р. (F.R. in Russian Cyrillic) can be found on cloisonné enamel objects made in Moscow, which he sold both independently, as well as under Fabergé.

== Sources ==
- H.C. Bainbridge, Peter Carl Fabergé: Goldsmith and Jeweller to the Russian Imperial Court (1966)
- G.von Habsburg-Lothringen & A.von Solodkoff, Fabergé - Court Jeweler to the Tsars (1979) ISBN 0-914427-09-1
- М.М. Постникова-Лосева, Н.Г.П. Платонова, Б.Л. Ульяноа, ЗОЛОТОЕ И СЕРЕБРЯНОЕ ДЕЛО XV-XX вв. (2003)
