= Jonas Vaiškūnas =

Lithuanian astronomer

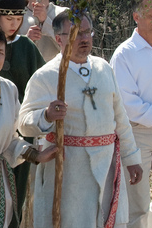
- Vaiškūnas during a Romuva procession
- Born: 6 March 1961 (age 65); Papiškė, Švenčionys District Municipality, Lithuanian Soviet Socialist Republic
- Occupations: ethnoastronomer, physicist, museologist, publisher, politician, vaidila
- Spouse: Daiva Vaiškūnienė

Jonas Vaiškūnas (born 6 March 1961) is a Lithuanian ethnoastronomer, religious leader, publisher and politician. He is the head of the department of ethnography at the Museum of Molėtai and priest in the Baltic neopagan organisation Romuva.

== Biography ==
Jonas Vaiškūnas was born on 6 March 1961 in the village Papiškė in Švenčionys District Municipality. He graduated from the physics department of Vilnius University in 1984. In the 1980s, he worked in the physics department at the Lithuanian Academy of Sciences. From 1990 to 1998, he worked as a researcher and museologist at the Lithuanian Museum of Ethnocosmology in Molėtai. He is the head of the Museum of Molėtai's Ethnographical Hut and Sky Observation Post, which he created in the 1990s. Since 2002, he is the director of the Archaeoastronomical Centre of the Lithuanian Academy of Sciences.

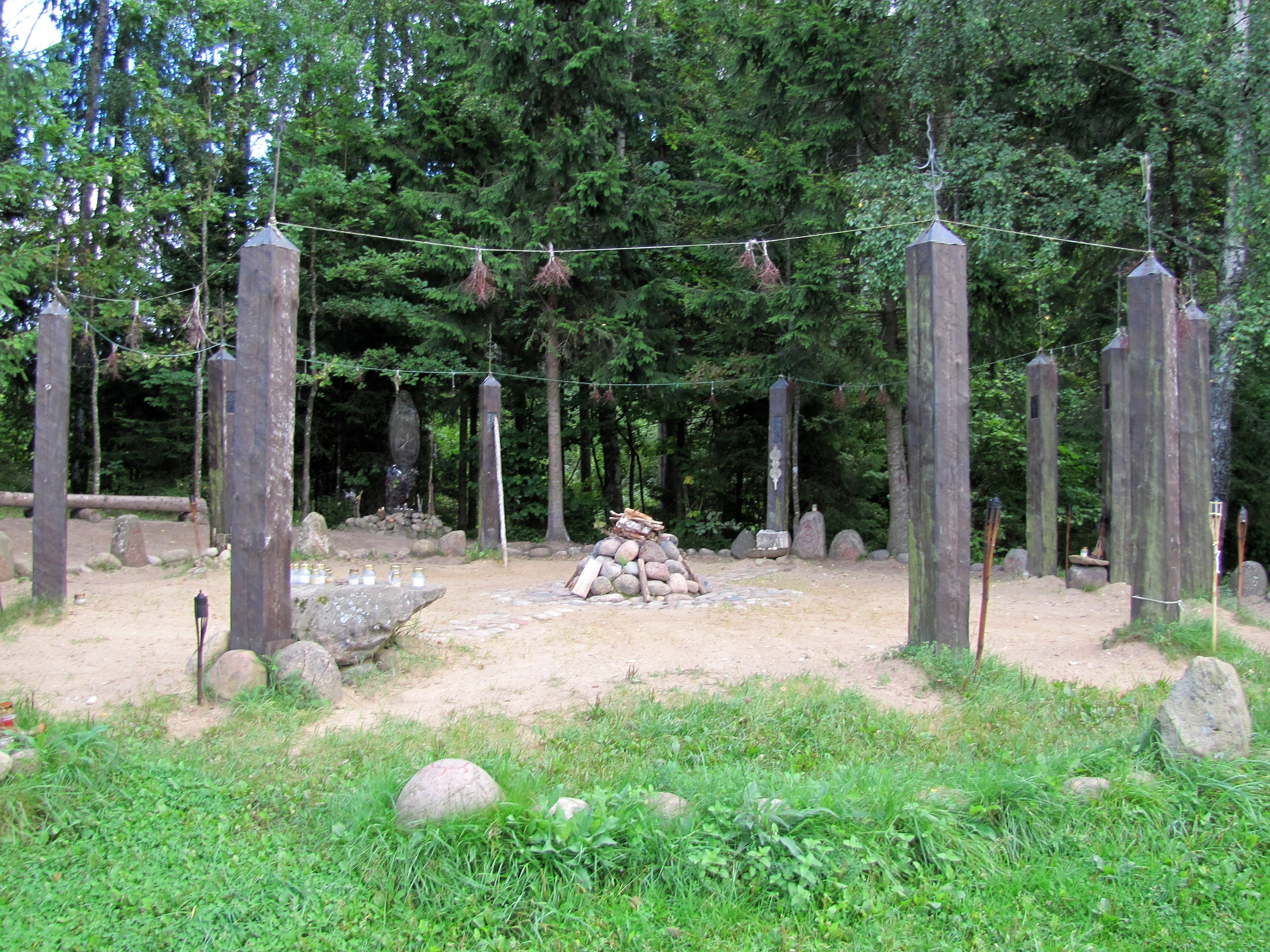
Vaiškūnas created the Sky Observation Post in Molėtai.

Vaiškūnas has published more than 40 scientific papers and more than 400 articles of popular science. In 2010, he co-founded the online newspaper Alkas.lt, for which he became editor-in-chief in 2011. In 2012, he published a book about the Lithuanian zodiac, Skaitant dangaus ženklus (lit. 'Reading the signs of heaven'). This zodiac has only survived in fragmentary attestations, which Vaiškūnas used in an attempt to reconstruct it. It is closely related to the standard Western zodiac but has culture-specific elements. Vaiškūnas has been interviewed in the Lithuanian media in his role as ethnoastronomer during calendar holidays and celestial phenomena.

Vaiškūnas is a vaidila (priest) in the Baltic neopagan organisation Romuva. He became involved in politics in 1988 when he represented the Reform Movement of Lithuania locally in Molėtai until 1991. Since 1996, he is active in the Lithuanian Nationalist and Republican Union.

== Personal life ==
Vaiškūnas is married to the mathematician Daiva Vaiškūnienė. They have three daughters, born in 1990, 1993 and 1998.
