= Kovsh =

Traditional Russian drinking vessel

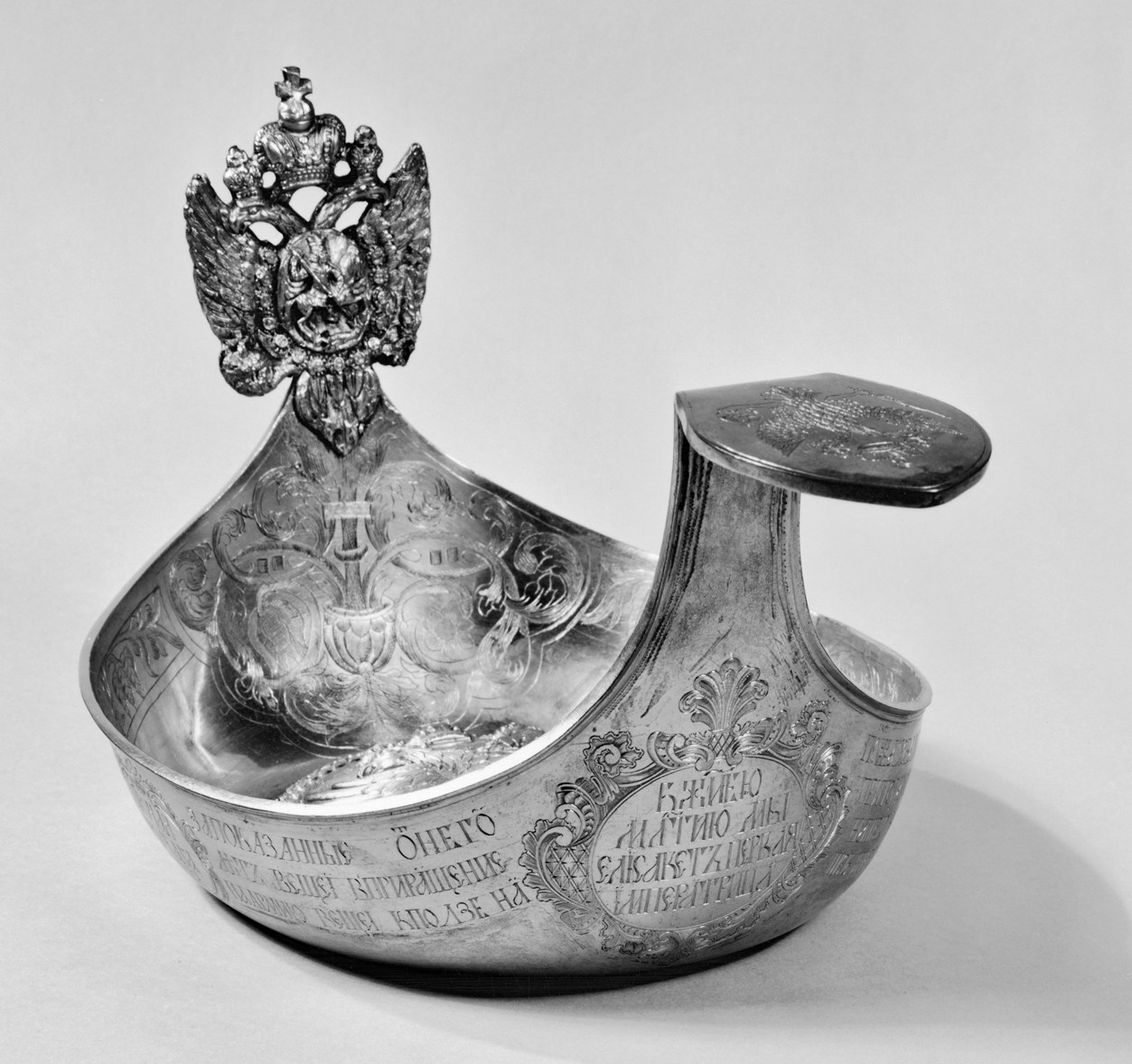
A kovsh by Vasilli Matveev Kunkin from 1758; in the collection of the Walters Art Museum

The kovsh (Russian: ковш) is a traditional drinking vessel or ladle from Russia. It is oval-shaped like a boat with a single handle and may be shaped like a water bird or a Norse longship. Originally, the kovsh was made from wood and used to serve and drink mead, with specimens excavated from as early as the 10th century. The metal kovsh began to appear around the 14th century, although it also continued to be carved out of wood and was frequently brightly painted in peasant motifs. By the 17th century, the kovsh was often an ornament rather than a practical vessel, and in the 19th century, it was elaborately cast in precious metals for presentation as an official gift of the tsarist government.

== See also ==
- Bratina (drinking vessel)
- Prapojsk kovsh-bratina
