= Heidrun Mohr-Mayer =

German jeweller (1941–2014)

Heidrun Mohr-Mayer (5 March 1941 – 14 October 2014) was a German jeweller and philanthropist. She was a CEO of the jewelry company Fabergé workmaster Victor Mayer from 1996 to 2001 and was a co-founder and supporter of several cultural institutions.

Mohr-Mayer was born Heidrun Steffen in Danzig during World War II. In 1945, during the Allied and Soviet bombardment of Danzig she had to flee with her mother and three sisters to Sweden. She attended school there and in Düsseldorf, Germany where she studied sport and art education. She married the jeweller Herbert Mohr-Mayer in 1967. With him she had three sons, Marcus O. Mohr, Daniel Mohr and Philipp Mohr. She became instrumental in the Victor Mayer/ Fabergé family business and led the company during successful years in the late 90s.

Heidrun Mohr-Mayer co-founded the Else Mayer Foundation in 2006. This institution awards grants to women in the German Women's Lib Movement. She also co-founded the Günter Grass Foundation, which raises awareness of his cultural heritage in the former German city of Danzig.

In 2000 she made a donation of an Amber Fabergé Egg to Gdańsk designed by Philipp Mohr for the city's 1000th anniversary of foundation. The gold elements and enamel detail were prepared by Victor Mayer and the amber parts (base and big and small egg with an insect inclusion) were by "Podżorski" in Sopot. Its total weight is which 213.48g, includes gold 18k 136g, amber 76g, diamond 0.2-carat (0.040 g), ruby 1.3-carat (0.26 g), sapphire 1.46-carat (0.292 g), and arms of Gdańsk - enamel. The egg is valued at 80,000 US$.
