= Gorbachev Peace (Fabergé egg) =

Fabergé-style egg

Gorbachev Peace Fabergé egg
- Recipient: Mikhail Gorbachev

Design and materials
- Workmaster: Victor Mayer
- Materials used: gold and enamel
- Surprise: a golden dove

The Gorbachev Peace egg is a Fabergé egg by Fabergé workmaster Victor Mayer. In 1991, Herbert Mohr-Mayer gave the Gorbachev Peace Egg to Mikhail Gorbachev, president of the former Soviet Union. It was given as a tribute to the way in which Gorbachev had succeeded in reducing tensions between East and West. Gorbachev subsequently donated this egg as an Easter present to the Kremlin Museum in Moscow.

The egg is made of 18 karat yellow gold and covered with transparent green vitreous enamel. The upper half of the egg opens up to reveal a golden dove.
