= Aalto Vase =

1936 vase design by Alvar and Aino Aalto

The Aalto Vase, also known as the Savoy Vase, is a piece of glassware created by Alvar Aalto and his wife Aino that has become an internationally known iconic piece of Finnish design. It became known as the Savoy Vase because it was one of a range of custom furnishings and fixtures created by Alvar and Aino Aalto for the luxury Savoy restaurant in Helsinki that opened in 1937.

The vase was also designed as an entry in a design competition for the Ahlström-owned Karhula-Iittala glassworks factory in 1936. The design was inspired by the dress of a Sami woman. Called Eskimåkvinnans skinnbyxa (the Eskimo woman's leather breech), the design consisted of a series of crayon drawings on cardboard and scratch paper. Aalto created initial prototypes by blowing glass in the middle of a composition of wooden sticks stuck into the ground, letting the molten glass swell on only some sides and creating a wavy outline. The initial manufacture of the vase was not without problems and the original idea of using molds made of thin steel sheets forced together to form closed sinuous shapes had to be abandoned. The vase was originally manufactured by the glassworks factory using a wood mold which was slowly burned away.

This vase was later displayed for the 1937 World's Fair in Paris and the original height of the Savoy vase was 140 millimetres (5.5 in).

Aalto never made money with the vase, because the design belonged to the factory for which the design competition entry was produced.

The vase has been manufactured in nearly a full spectrum of colours. The simplicity of the vase continues to be popular in the 21st century. Smaller versions of the vase, just as Aalto designed them with the seams visible and a slight curve at the base, are still produced by glasspressing at the Iittala glass factory in Iittala, Finland. Larger versions are made using Aalto's design, but without seams.

In recent times the vase has achieved iconic status, inspiring adaptations and appropriations by contemporary designers including Jan Ctvrtnik, Maxim Velčovský and Tobi Wong.
