= Terminal 5 =

Terminal 5 may refer to:

- Heathrow Terminal 5, a passenger terminal at London Heathrow Airport, England
- Heathrow Terminal 5 station, a rail station serving London Heathrow Terminal 5
- Terminal 5 (venue), a venue in New York City
- TWA Flight Center, originally known as the Trans World Flight Center, now Terminal 5 at John F. Kennedy International Airport, New York
- Terminal 5 (exhibition), art exhibition at the TWA Flight Center, October 2004
