= Savoy (disambiguation) =

Savoy is a historical country in western Europe, heart of the Savoyard state.

Savoy or The Savoy may also refer to:

== Places ==
- County of Savoy, a Middle Ages county near where modern Switzerland, Italy and France meet
- Duchy of Savoy, a duchy in the Italian peninsula during the Middle Ages
- Liberty of the Savoy, in London, England
  - Precinct of the Savoy
- Savoy, a zone of Sliema, Malta
- Savoy Estate, a suburb of Johannesburg, South Africa
- Savoy, Arkansas, U.S.
- Savoy, Illinois, U.S.
- Savoy, Massachusetts, U.S.
- Savoy, Montana, U.S., an unincorporated community of Blaine County
- Savoy, Texas, U.S.
- Savoy, Wisconsin, U.S., a ghost town

== Buildings ==
=== Cinemas and theatres ===
==== UK ====
- Safari Cinema or the Savoy in Croydon, UK
- Savoy Theatre, London, UK
- Savoy Theatre, Monmouth, UK
- Kettering Savoy, Kettering, UK
- Savoy Theatre/Cinema, now The Deco, Northampton, UK

==== Other places ====
- Savoy Theatre, Melbourne, Australia, a former cinema
- Savoy Theatre, Glace Bay, Canada
- Savoy Theatre, Helsinki, Finland
- Savoy Cinema, Dublin, Ireland
- Savoy Cinema, Colombo, Sri Lanka
- Savoy Theatre (New York City), US

=== Hotels ===
- Brighton Savoy Hotel, Brighton, Victoria, Australia
- Savoy Baur en Ville, Zürich, Switzerland
- Savoy Homann Bidakara Hotel, Bandung, Indonesia
- Savoy Hotel, London, UK
- Savoy Hotel, Copenhagen, Denmark
- Savoy Hotel, Moscow, Russia
- Savoy Hotel, Mussoorie, Uttarakhand, India
- Savoy Hotel, Perth, Australia
- Savoy Hotel and Grill, Kansas City, Missouri

=== Other buildings ===
- The Savoy (Indianapolis, Indiana), US
- Savoy Ballroom, Harlem, Manhattan, New York City, US
- Savoy Ballroom (Chicago), Chicago, Illinois, US
- Savoy Chapel, London, UK
- Savoy Palace, London, UK
- Savoy Pier, London, UK

== Music ==
- Savoy Company, Gilbert and Sullivan ensemble in Philadelphia
- Savoy (Norwegian band), a Norwegian-American rock trio
  - Savoy (Savoy album), 2004
- Savoy (Taj Mahal album), 2023
- Savoy (American band)
- Savoy opera, a style of comic opera
- Savoy Records, an American jazz record label
- Savoy Family Band, a Louisiana Cajun band
- "Savoy Truffle", a song by The Beatles
- "Stompin' at the Savoy", a jazz standard by Edgar Sampson

== Literature ==
- Hotel Savoy (novel), a novel by Joseph Roth
- Savoy (magazine), an American magazine founded in 2001
- The Savoy (periodical), an 1896 London literary magazine

== Other uses ==
- Savoy cabbage, a type of cabbage which has curly leaves
- Savoy Operation, a 1975 PLO terrorist attack at the Savoy Hotel, Tel-Aviv, Israel
- Savoy Pictures, a motion picture company
- House of Savoy, the last royal dynasty of Italy
- Operation Savoy, a 2002 ICAC investigation about thefts at the Australian Museum
- Plymouth Savoy, an American automobile
- Infantry Regiment "Saboya" No. 6 or Regiment of Savoy No. 6, a mechanized infantry unit in the Spanish Army
- Savoy crackers, made by Arnott's Biscuits
- Savoy wine, a designated AOC in France
- Savoy (restaurant), a restaurant in Helsinki, Finland
- The Savoy, a 2020 British television series filmed within the Savoy Hotel, London

== People with the surname ==
- Andy Savoy (born 1963), Canadian politician and engineer
- Ann Savoy (born 1952), American musician, author, and record producer
- Brian Savoy (born 1992), Swiss basketball player
- Gene Savoy (1927–2007), American author and explorer
- Joel Savoy, Louisiana musician
- Marc Savoy (born 1940), Cajun accordionist and accordion maker
- Paul Waaktaar-Savoy (born 1961), Norwegian musician and songwriter
- Suzanne Savoy, American actress
- Teresa Ann Savoy (1955–2017), British-born actress
- Wilson Savoy (born 1982), American musician and singer

== See also ==
- Sovay, a folk song in which a woman puts her "true love" to a test
- Savoie (disambiguation)
- Savoye (disambiguation)
- Savoyard (disambiguation)
