= Anton Krautheimer =

German sculptor

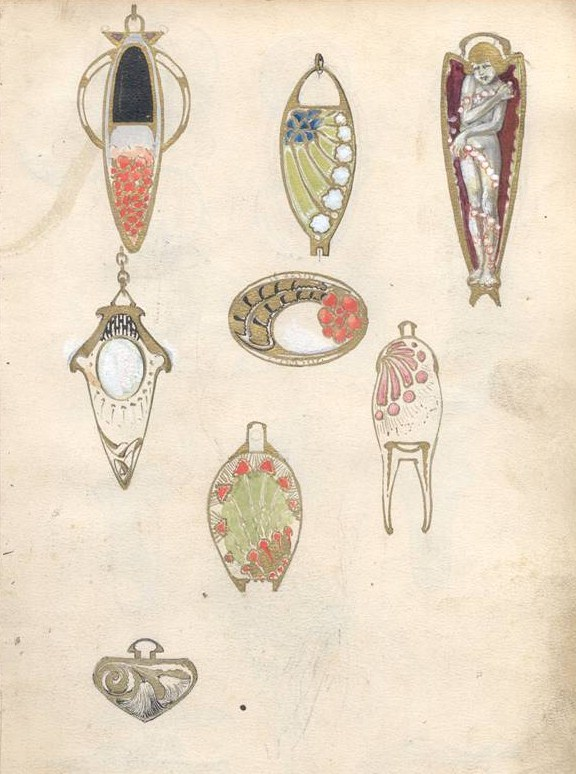
Jewellery designs from Anton Krautheimer's drawing-book, about 1903, Victor Mayer Archive

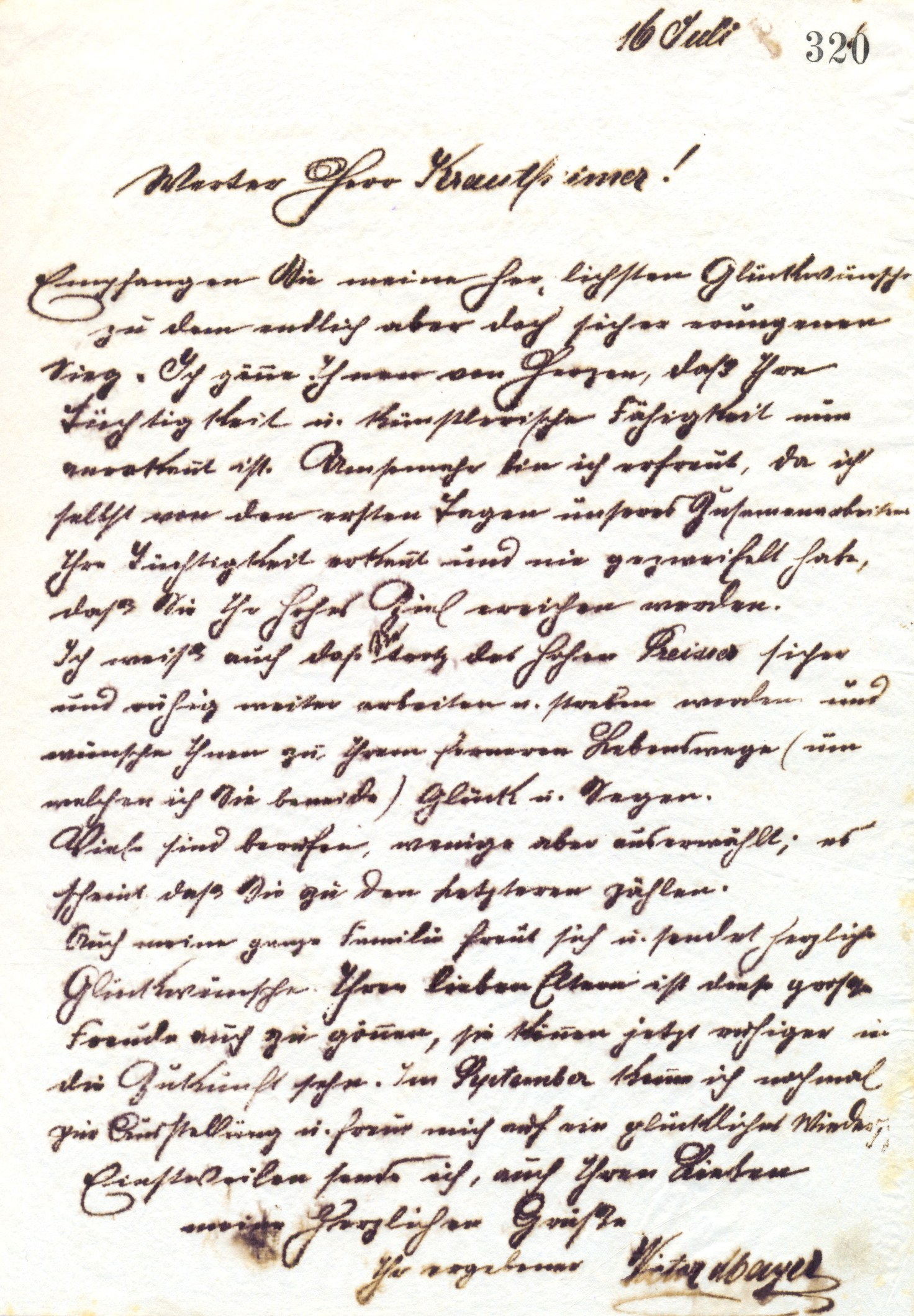
Victor Mayer congratulates Anton Krautheimer on his winning the Rome Prize

Anton Krautheimer (born 1879; died during the 20th century) was a German sculptor who lived in Munich.

== Biography ==
From 1900 on, Krautheimer studied in Munich at the Academy of Fine Arts. His teachers were Josef Eberle, Wilhelm von Rümann and Adolf von Hildebrand. During his studies, he worked for the jewelry manufacture Victor Mayer in Pforzheim/Germany as a jewelry designer and steel engraver. The archive there preserves photographs of jewelry after his designs, his drawing-book with designs of Art Nouveau jewelry and many copies of letters that Victor Mayer wrote to him.

In 1908, he won the prestigious Rome Prize and in 1909, he started to work as an independent sculptor in Munich. Henceforth, he exhibited statues in marble, bronze and wood, busts and small sculptures with the Munich Secession and the Exhibitions in the Munich Glaspalast. Many of his works are still to be found in Germany’s public space, for example, the Fountain of Heracles in the Dom-Pedro-Platz in Munich, the tomb of the Lotz-family in the cemetery in Berlin Zehlendorf and the statue of Siegfried on the Siegried-Fountain in Worms, Germany made by order of Adolf von Hildebrand.
