= Jennifer & Kevin McCoy =

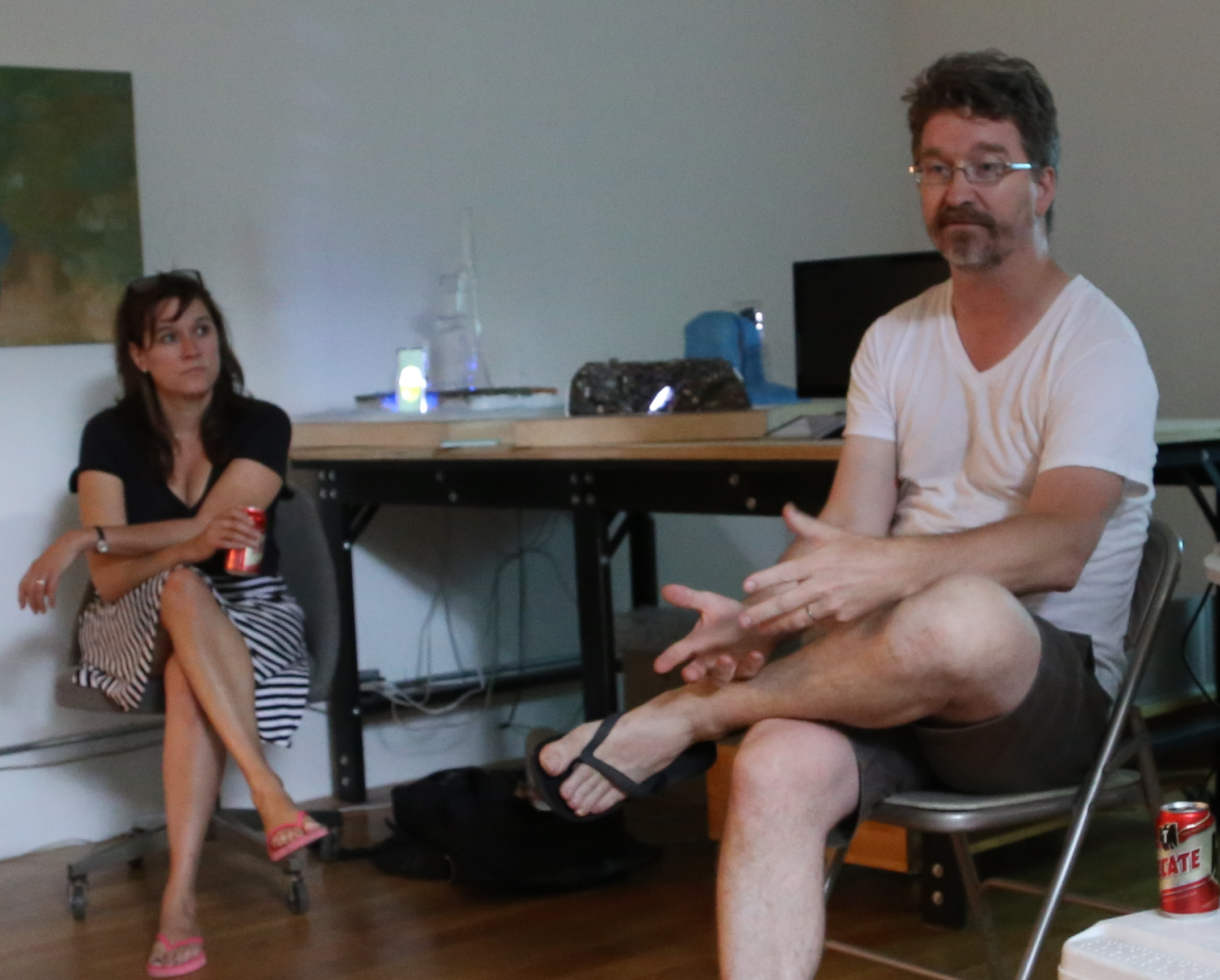
Jennifer McCoy and Kevin McCoy give the New York Arts Practicum an artist talk and critique at their Greenpoint studio

Jennifer and Kevin McCoy are an artistic duo and couple based in Brooklyn, NY. They work with interactive media, film, performance and installation to explore personal experience in relation to new technology, mass media, and global commerce. The McCoys are influenced by Lev Manovich and his theories on digital culture and their work often re-examines classic cinema, science fiction, or television through sculptural objects, net art, robotic movies or live performance. They were the recipients of the Creative Capital Award in the discipline of Emerging Fields in 2002 and the Guggenheim Fellowship in 2011. In 2014, Kevin collaborated with Anil Dash to co-create Monegraph, short for “monetized graphics.” The work "Quantum", was included in Sotheby's "Natively Digital: A Curated NFT Sale" in June 2021.

== Biography ==
The McCoys met in Paris in 1990. They subsequently studied together at Rensselaer Polytechnic Institute in Troy, New York where they both received their MFA in Electronic Art, studying in part under Pauline Oliveros.

== Career ==
The McCoys' work has been widely exhibited in the US and internationally with exhibitions including the Pompidou Center in Paris, the Museum of Modern Art in New York, the British Film Institute - Southbank in London, The Metropolitan Museum of Art, The San Jose Museum of Art, The Addison Museum of American Art, The Sundance Film Festival, and many other venues in the US, Europe and Asia. Their work can be seen in the collections of the Museum of Modern Art, The Metropolitan Museum of Art, The Museum of Fine Arts, Houston, The Milwaukee Art Museum, the 21C Museum, and The Speed Museum. Their work is held in museum collections including the Metropolitan Museum of Art, MoMA, and Mudam. Articles about their work have appeared in Art in America, Artforum, The Wire, dArt International, Spin Magazine, Feed, and The Independent. They were the recipients of the Wired Magazine Rave Award for Art in 2005.

The McCoys are represented by Postmasters Gallery in New York and Expanded.art in Berlin. In 2022, Kevin received a Webby Lifetime Achievement Award from the International Academy of Digital Arts and Sciences for co-developing the technology that eventually became known as the NFT.

The McCoys have been involved in academic programs at MoMA and the Whitney Museum and are both educators at the university level. Jennifer is a professor of Art at Brooklyn College and Kevin is an associate professor in the Department of Art and Art Professions at New York University. They both live and work in Brooklyn, NY.

== Artworks ==
The McCoys undertook the "World Views" residency programmed on the World Trade Center's 91st floor in 1998. From this residency, the artists developed a series of interventions into global capitalism including works such as web-based banner ads satirizing corporate aesthetics and jargon. The artists then used the Doubleclick.com network to distribute 1 million of these banner ads over one month, from mid-August to mid-September 1999. Doubleclick.com, which sponsored the project, did not inform sites on which the ads were displayed that they were playing host to an artistic intervention.

The McCoys are best known for their database pieces, in which they break down a series of films or TV shows into individual shots, and categorize them according to a classification schema of their own making. The piece Every Shot Every Episode (2001) was a collection of 10,000 shots from the Starsky and Hutch television series that were categorized according to 278 categories such as 'every plaid,' 'every sexy outfit,' 'every yellow Volkswagen.' Shots relating to each category were then burned to a DVD and installed on a shelf in the gallery along with a specially designed video player.

In 2002, the McCoys created "Horror Chase." According to their website, "this work is based on the climatic chase sequence from Evil Dead II." The artists re-enact the scene on a specially designed stage set. Each shot in the sequence is individually digitized. Custom computer software selects these clips at random, playing them back in a seamless but continuously variable way, changing the speed and direction of play. The images are projected at cinematic scale and the computer hardware is installed in a black briefcase, which forms part of the installation."

In 2004, the dormant Saarinen-designed TWA Flight Center (now Jetblue Terminal 5) at JFK Airport briefly hosted an art exhibition called Terminal 5 curated by Rachel K. Ward featuring the work of 18 artists including Jennifer & Kevin McCoy. The show featured work, lectures and temporary installations drawing inspiration from the idea of travel and the terminal's architecture.The show was to run from October 1, 2004 to January 31, 2005 — though it closed abruptly after the building itself was vandalized during the opening party.

More recently, the McCoys have been creating works that use miniature dioramas similar to model railroads or dolls' houses. Live video cameras are embedded in each diorama, capturing the miniature figures and landscapes from various angles. The resulting video feeds are then sequenced by a software which creates a real-time animated film sequence to be projected on the gallery wall. In Soft Rains (2003), the McCoys recreated archetypal scenes from cinema in this miniature form, making references to films such as Goldfinger, Friday the 13th, and Blue Velvet. Soft Rains consisted of 6 installations: "Beach Adventure," "Cabaret," "Dinner Party," "The Loft," "The Spa," and "Suburban Horror."

"I'll Replace You," (2008) offered a glimpse of the private life of the McCoys. The McCoy's staged scenes of their daily routines such as waking up, getting their children ready, teaching, meeting up with friends, etc. Kevin and Jennifer were 'replaced' by actors. Fifty actors were hired. In 2012 at Project Space in Seattle, WA set up a project called "Northwest Passing." The artists borrowed work from collectors of northwest art. They then hired actors who knew nothing of the work to give improvised tours. Use of the term passing refers to actors 'passing' as experts, Jennifer and Kevin 'passing' as northwest artists, and the art itself 'passing' as northwest art.

== Notable works ==
- Soft Rains (2003): A series of archetypal cinema scenes recreated in a series of miniature tableaux. Live cameras are trained on the dioramas from a variety of angles. Custom computer software sequences the live feeds into an endlessly repeating vignette, presented as projection on the gallery wall. The system functions as a computer-controlled soundstage that produces animated films in the gallery in real time.
- Airworld (1999): Explores the interconnections between airports, and the convergence of travel and everyday life, especially the dissolution of the barriers between personal life, professional life, personal space and community space.
- Small Appliances (1997): Ten short video narratives based around women's experiences with technology. Video and CD-Rom based artwork intended for exposition on the internet and in galleries.

== Awards ==
- 2022 Webby Lifetime Achievement Award, International Academy of Digital Arts and Sciences, New York, NY
- 2011 Fellowship, John Simon Guggenheim Memorial Foundation, New York, NY
- 2001 New Media Art Fellowship, Colbert Foundation, New York, NY
- 2000 Net Art Commission/Residency, The Alternative Museum, New York, NY
- 1999 New York Foundation for the Arts Computer Arts Grant recipient, New York, NY
- 1999 "World Views" Thundergulch Artist in Residence, New York, NY
- 1999 Harvestworks Artist in Residence, New York, NY.
