= Erlöserbund =

Former German religious institute

The Erlöserbund (Congregatio Salvatoris Mundi) was a German religious institute of episcopal right; it was founded in 1917 by Else Mayer and Alexandra Bischoff in Bonn.

At the time of its approbation by the archbishop Joseph Frings of Cologne in 1958 the institute had 148 religious sisters in several locations in Bonn, Breslau and other locations. The institute's foundresses also supported women's rights and helped women to get into schools and universities.

The institute was abandoned in 2005 and turned in a non-profit organisation. In a yearly award ceremony in Bonn a stipend is give to several select women who are doing outstanding work in the area of women's rights, academia and religious studies.
