= Esplanadi =

Esplanade and urban park in Helsinki, Finland

- Esplanaden
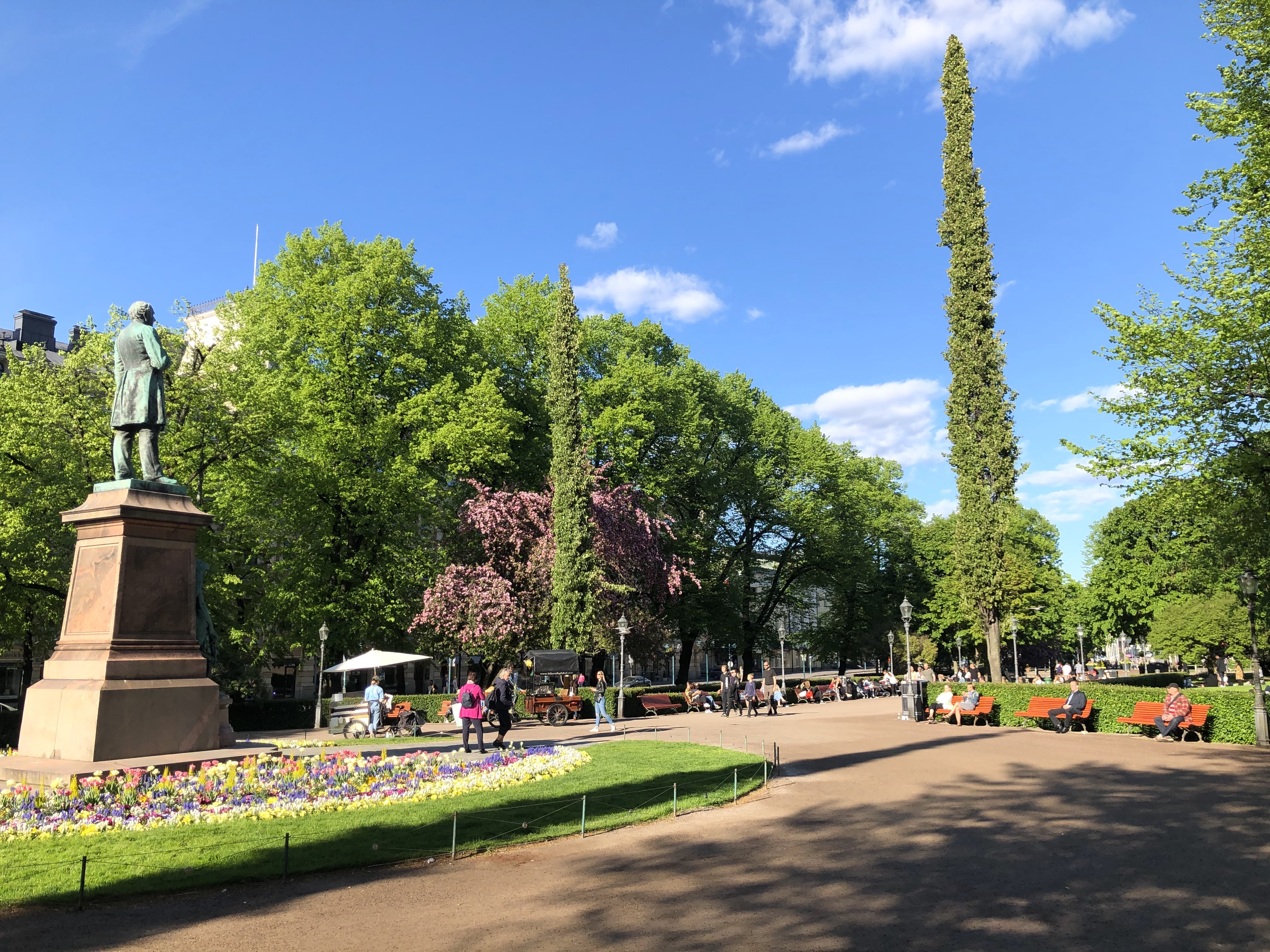
- The central walking path of Esplanadi, 2020.

- Location within Helsinki (mainland)
- Type: Urban park
- Location: Helsinki, Finland
- Coordinates: 60°10′03″N 24°56′52″E
- Established: 1818
- Designer: Carl Ludwig Engel

Esplanadi (Swedish: Esplanaden), colloquially known as Espa, is an esplanade and urban park in downtown Helsinki, Finland, situated between the Erottaja square and the Market Square. It is bordered on its northern and southern sides by the Pohjoisesplanadi (Norra Esplanaden, North Esplanadi) and Eteläesplanadi (Södra Esplanaden, South Esplanadi) streets, respectively. Aleksanterinkatu runs parallel to Esplanadi. Esplanadi is well known as a popular walking area, and street performances are also often held in the park.

In 1827, Engels Teater (the predecessor of the Swedish Theatre), the first theatre building in Helsinki, also designed by Engel, was erected in a corner of the park.

Centered in the park is a statue of Johan Ludvig Runeberg, the national poet of Finland, by his son Walter Runeberg. Other public art pieces include works by Viktor Jansson, Gunnar Finne and Lauri Leppänen.

Other prestigious restaurants on the edge of the park include Restaurant Olo on Pohjoisesplanadi and Savoy Restaurant on Eteläesplanadi.

Also located on the edge of Esplanadi are Stockmann, Kämp Galleria, Louis Vuitton, and Hotel Kämp.

== Gallery ==
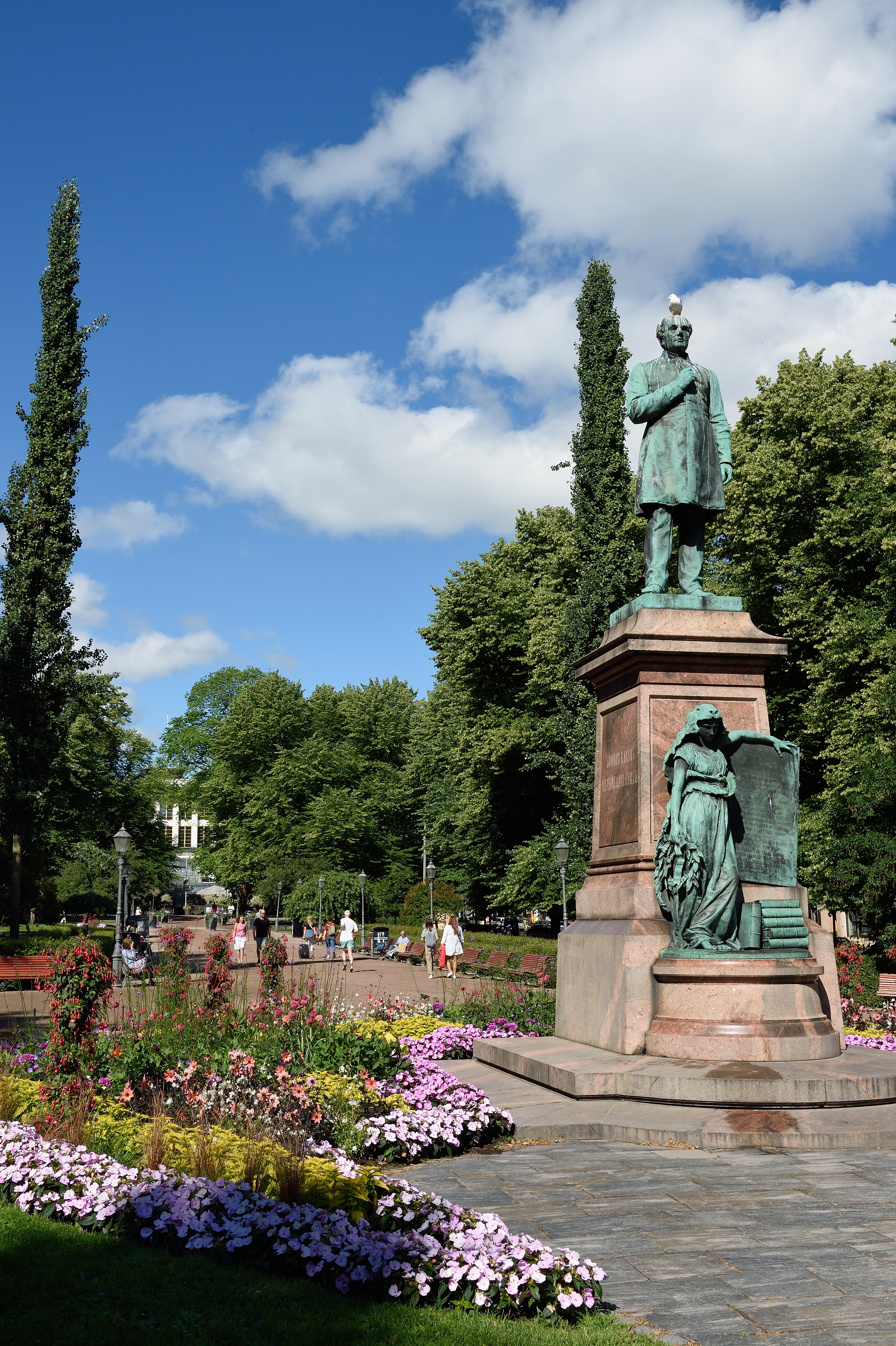
The statue of poet Johan Ludvig Runeberg.

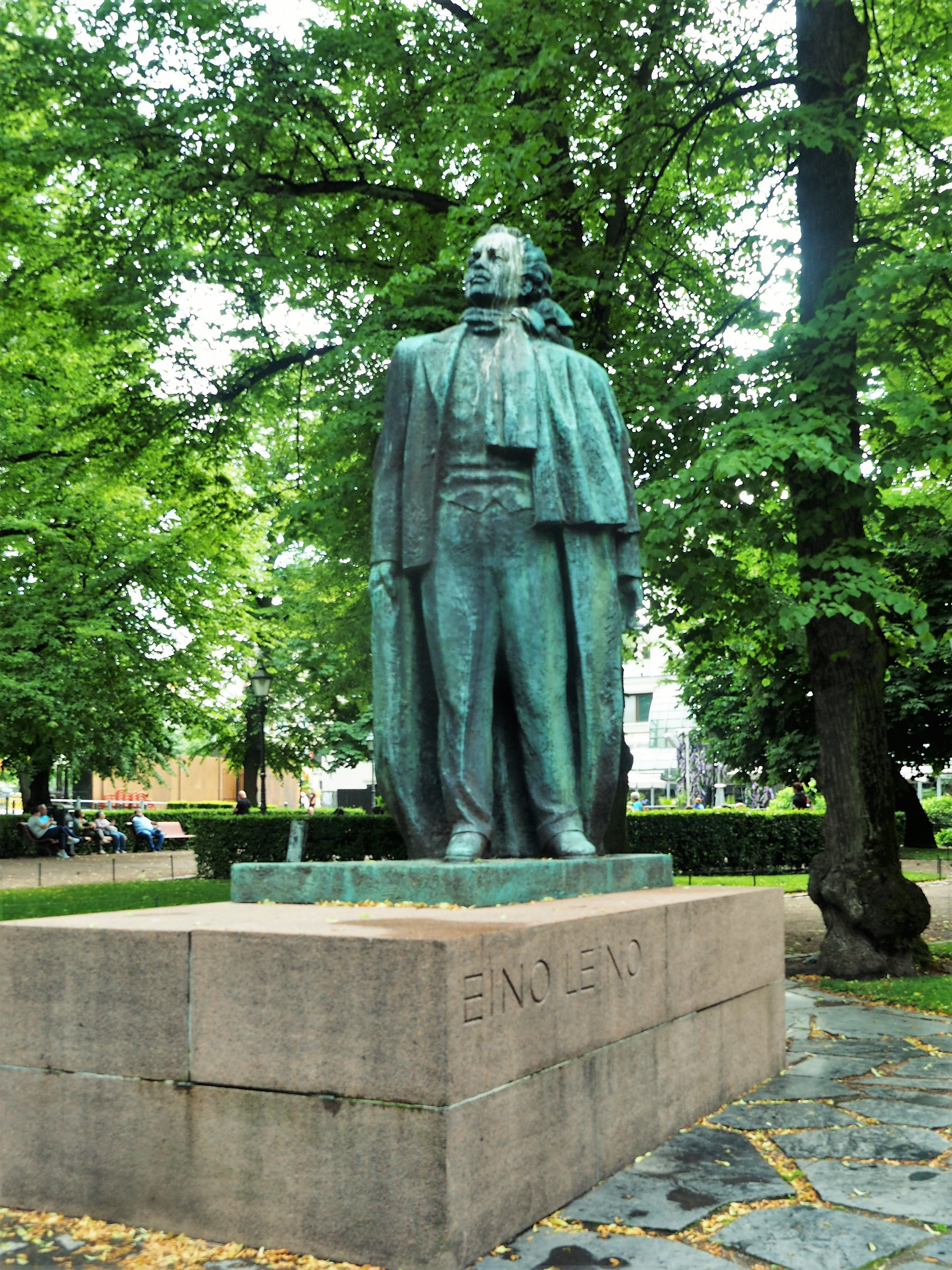
The statue of poet Eino Leino.

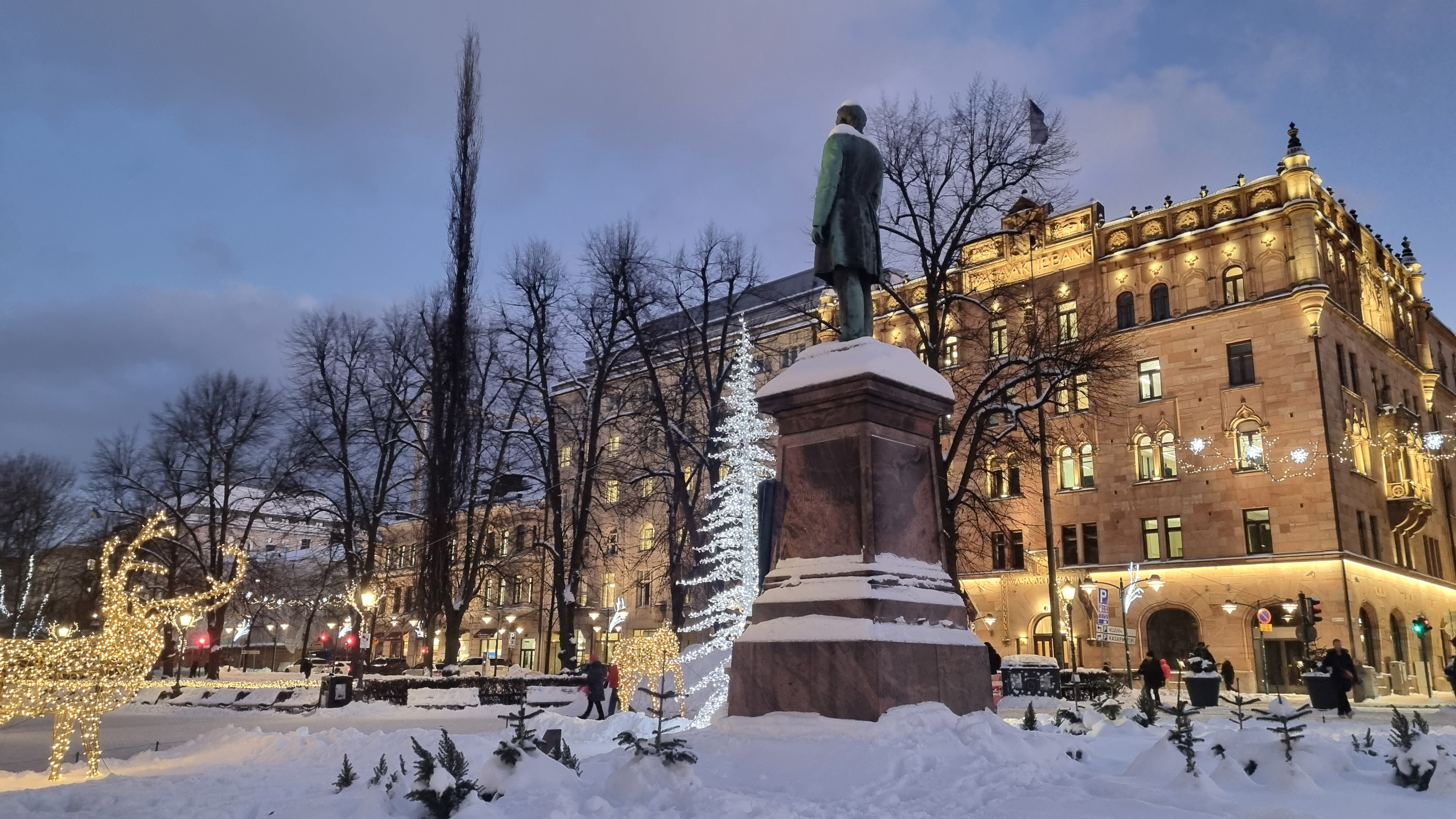
Park centre during the winter. Wasa Bank building behind the statue.

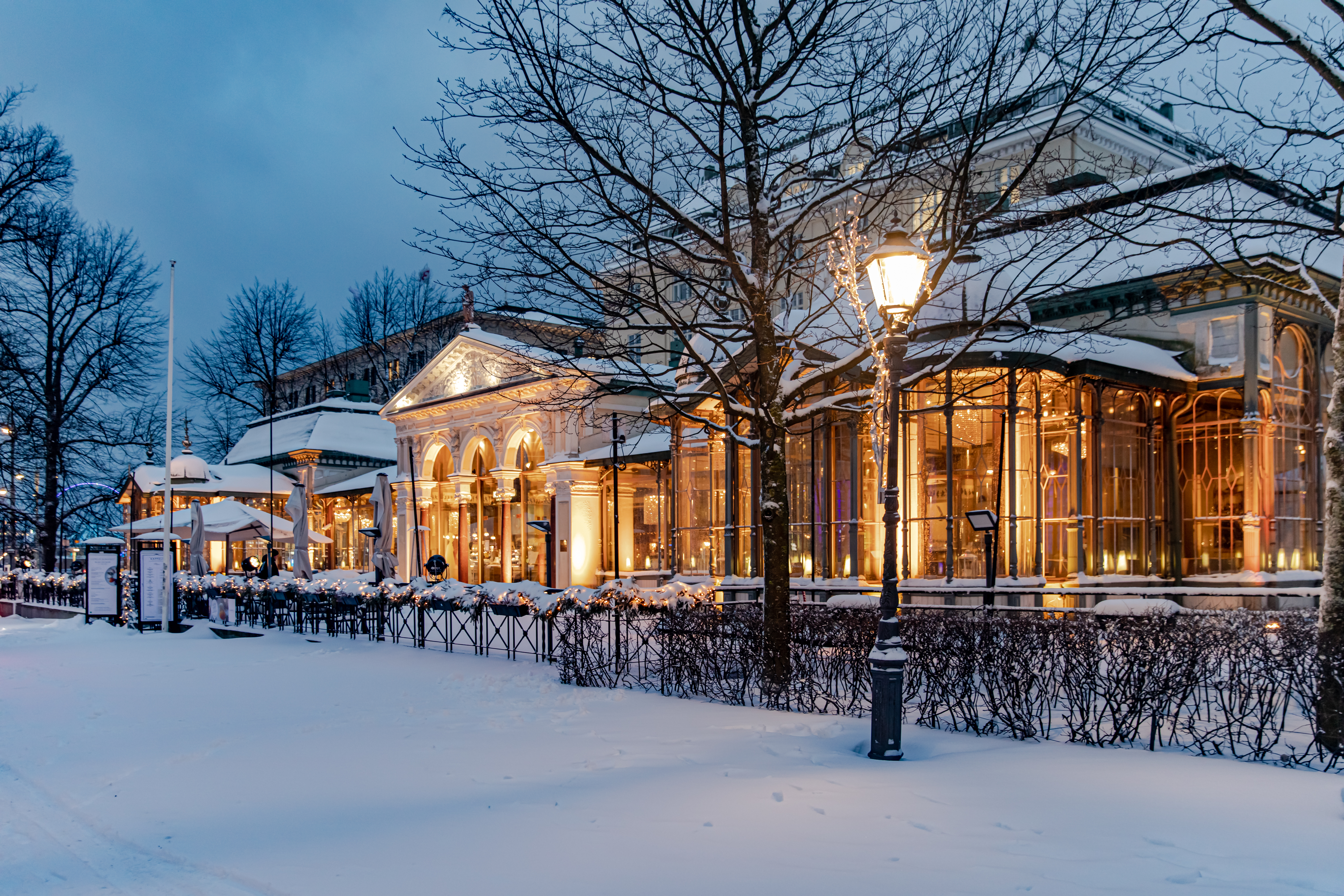
Restaurant Kappeli in the winter.

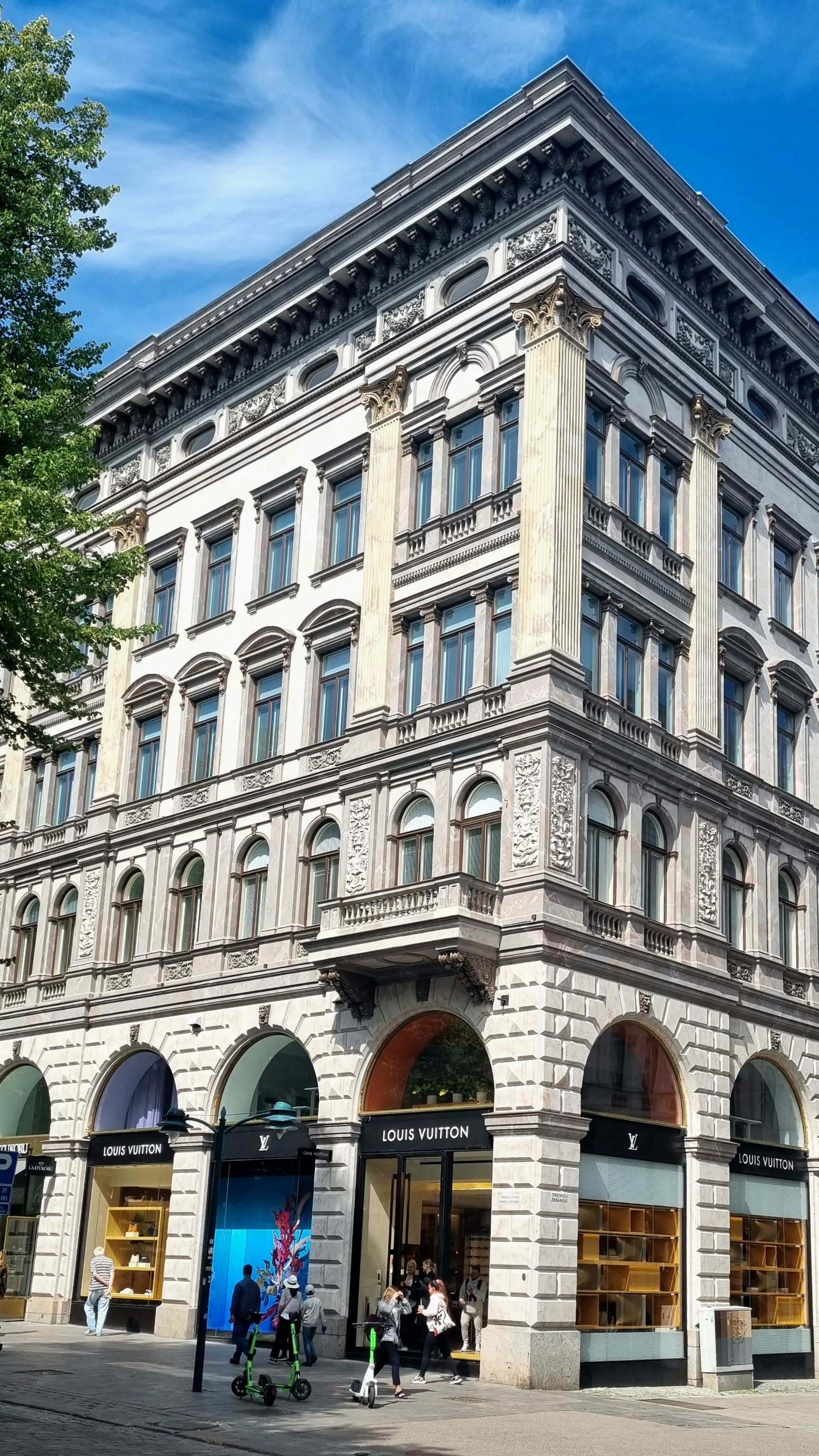
Louis Vuitton.

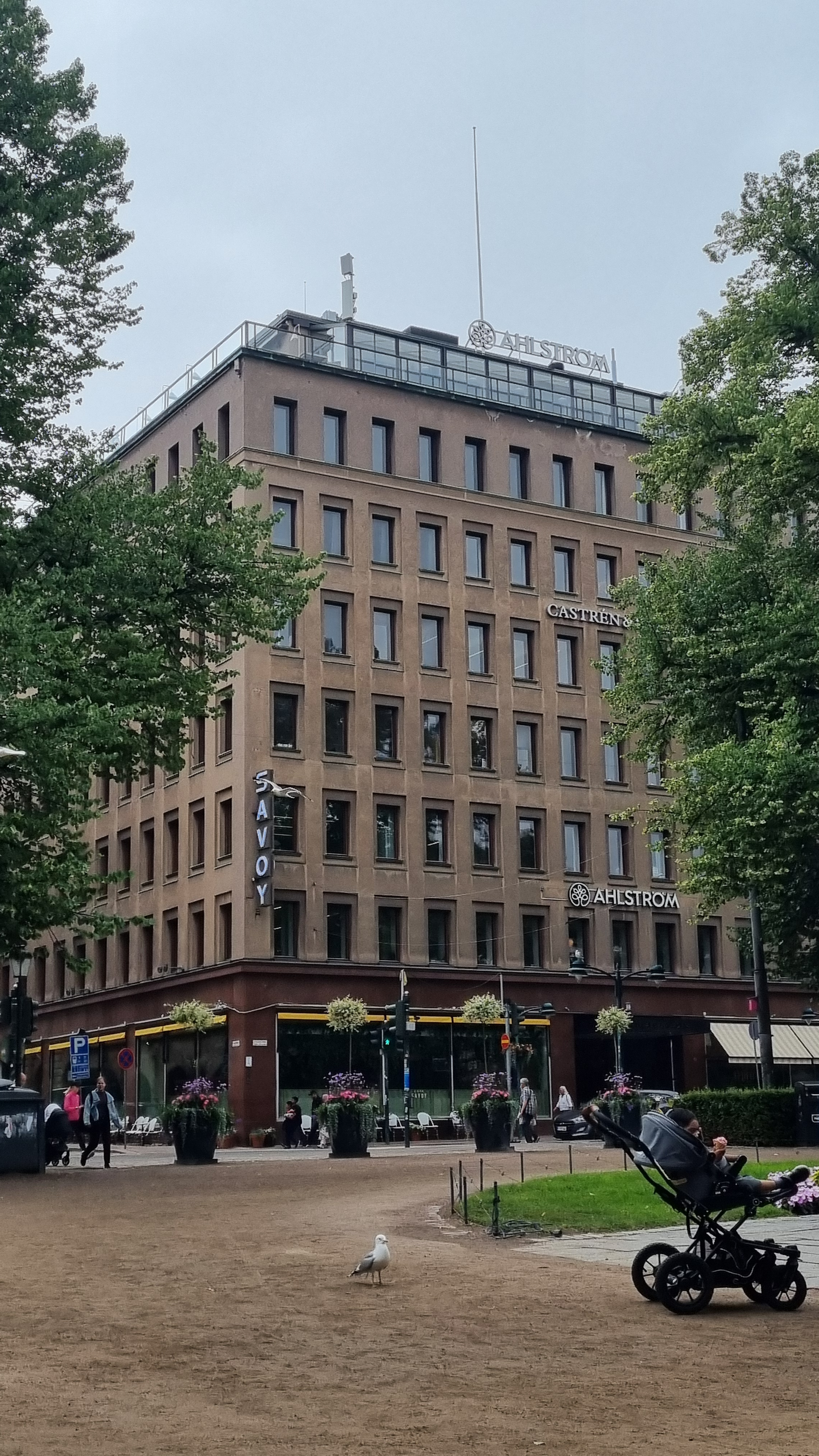
Savoy building.

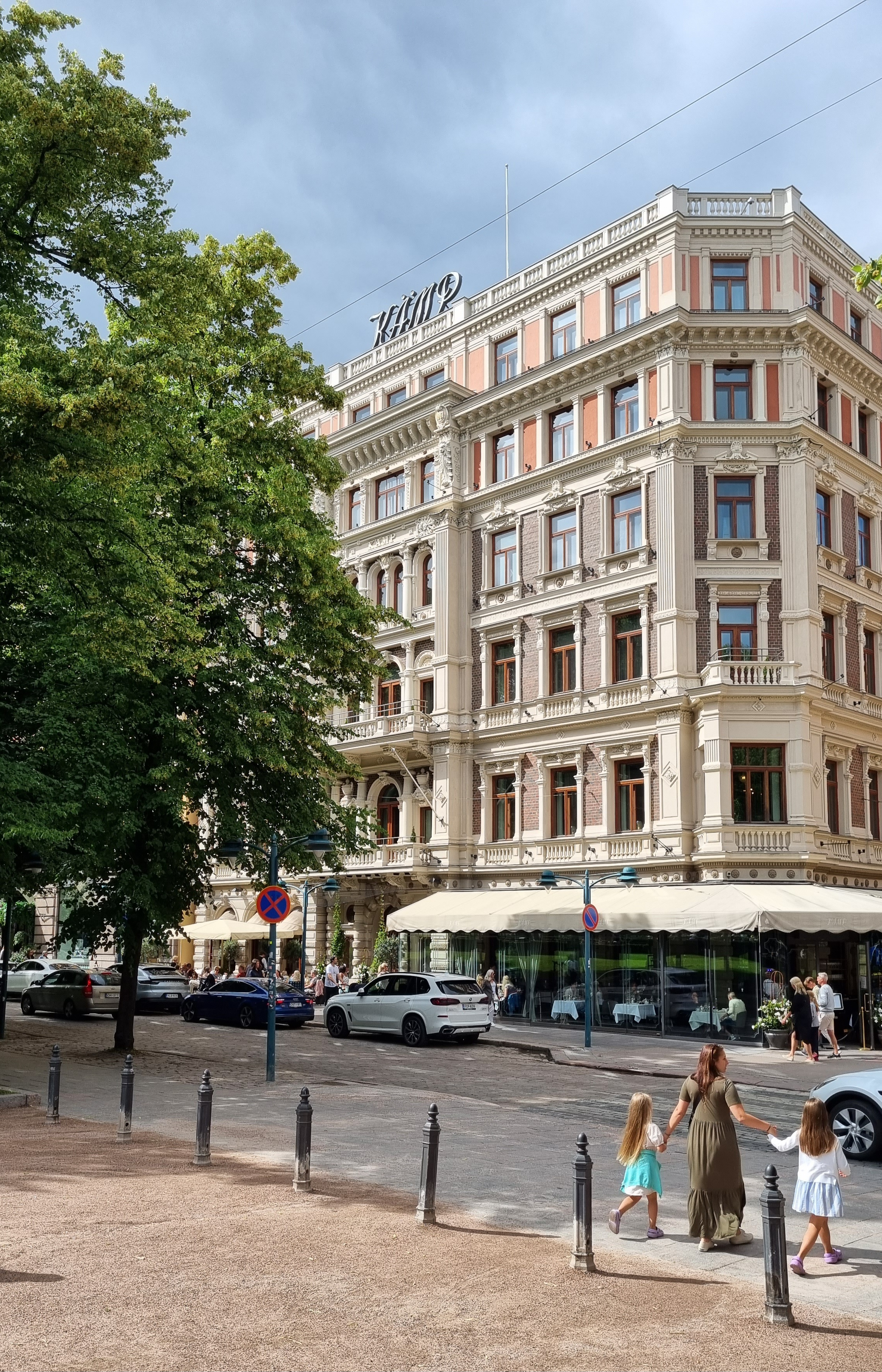
Hotel Kämp.

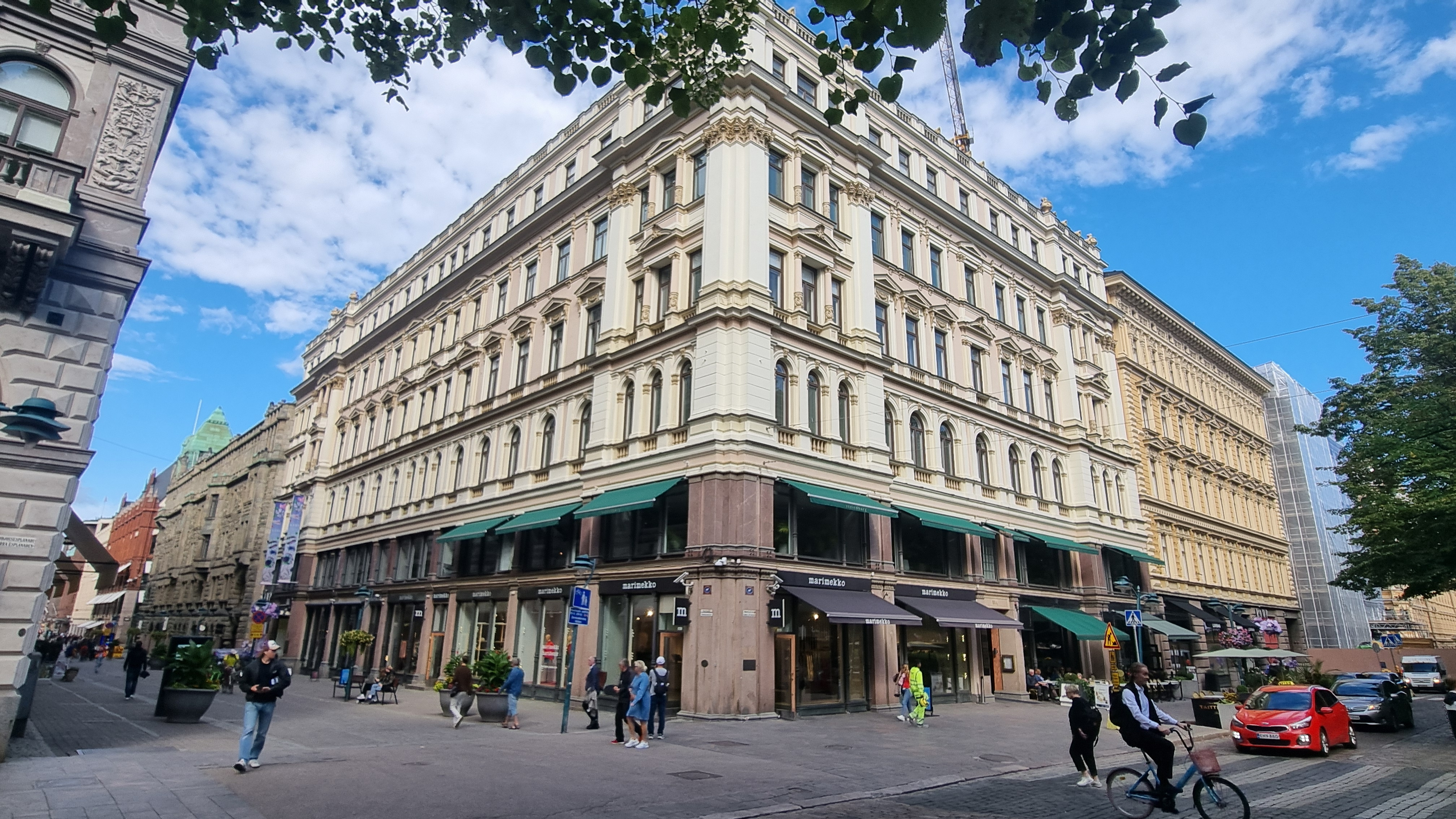
Kämp Galleria shopping centre.

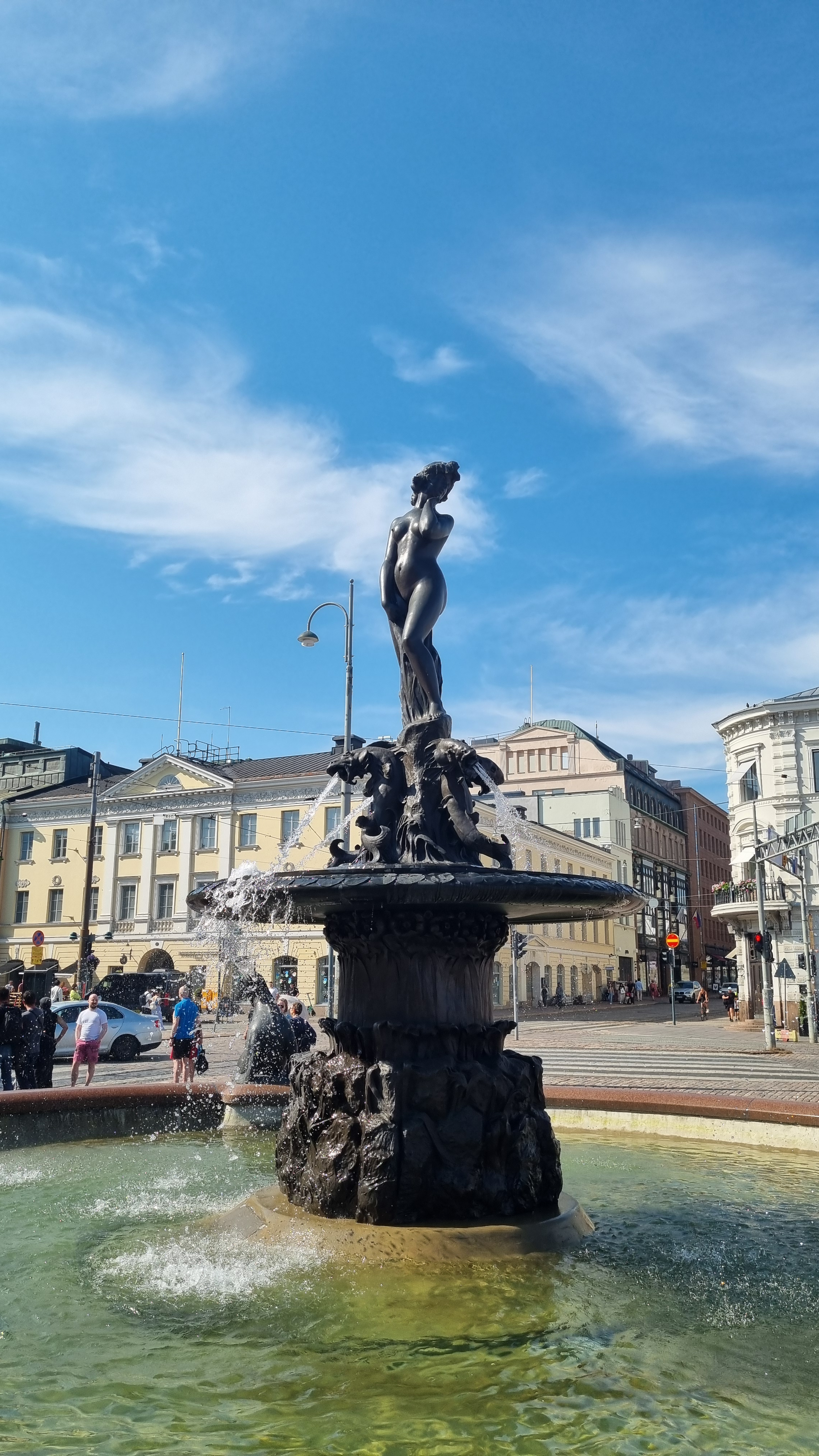
Havis Amanda.

== See also ==
- Stockmann
- Market Square
- Hotel Kämp
- Kämp Galleria
- Central Park (Helsinki)
- Kolmikulma
