= Savoye =

Savoye or de Savoye may refer to:

- Honorat II of Savoy or Honorat de Savoie, marquis of Villars (c. 1511–1580), Marshal of France and Admiral of France
- Pierre de Savoye (born 1942), Canadian politician
- Rob Savoye, primary developer of Gnash software

== See also ==
- Hof van Savoye, an early 16th-century building in Mechelen, Belgium
- Villa Savoye, a modernist villa and gatelodge in Poissy, on the outskirts Paris
- Ville-Savoye, France, a commune
- Savoy (disambiguation)
