= Philipp Mohr =

Architect and industrial designer

- Education: University Weimar; Polytechnic University Milano; Cooper Union
- Occupations: Architect, artist, author, and industrial designer

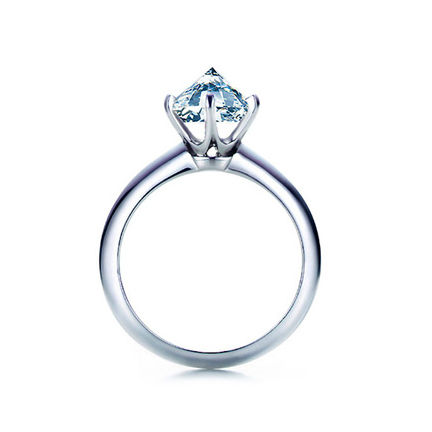
Killer Ring, 2004

Philipp Mohr is an American architect, artist, author, and industrial designer.

He is known for designing celebrity homes such as the New York apartment of German film director Tom Tykwer. In collaboration with other designers, he created several acclaimed industrial design and art objects. He studied architecture and fine arts at the Bauhaus University Weimar, Polytechnic University Milano and Cooper Union. In 2000 Mohr designed the Metaring, a computer-generated and machine-milled piece of jewelry. In 2004, he collaborated with Tobi Wong on a series of diamond clad industrial designs. Mohr participated in the 2004 group show at Terminal 5 (exhibition) together with Tobias Wong and their Diamond Project, the Killer Ring, Dimemond, Hidden Diamond Ring and Diamond Skull were featured in that exhibition.

In collaboration with design partner Ju$t Another Rich Kid, he created a series of conceptual jewelry. In 2013 Mohr collaborated with John Erik Karkula and designed the acclaimed furniture showroom in Williamsburg, Brooklyn. In 2018 Philipp Mohr Design Studio received a Dezeen Awards nomination for the renovation of a Le Corbusier apartment in Berlin. The renovation was a first realization of Le Corbusier’s design according to original plans. As actor and performer under artist noms de guerre Jack Xtra and Adam Secret he received several international awards and award nominations such as the Grabby Award, Infinity Award and Gaysight Award.
