= Kappeli =

Coordinates: 60°10′3″N 24°57′1″E

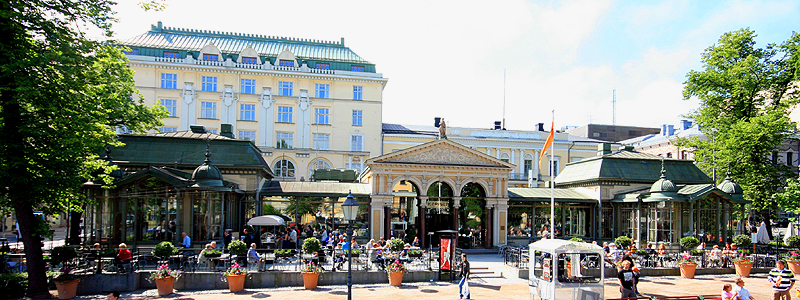
Restaurant Kappeli in summer

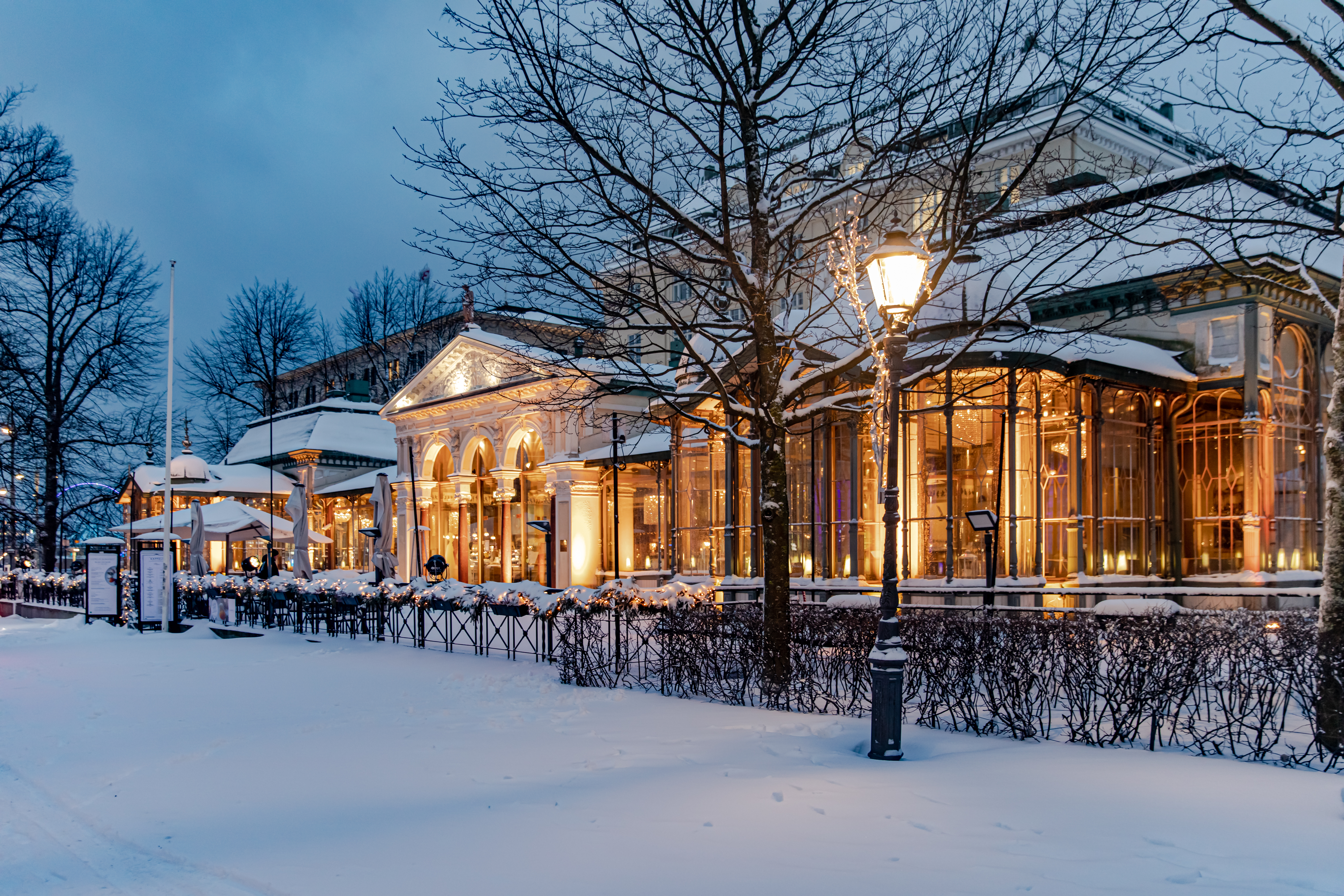
Restaurant Kappeli in January 2021

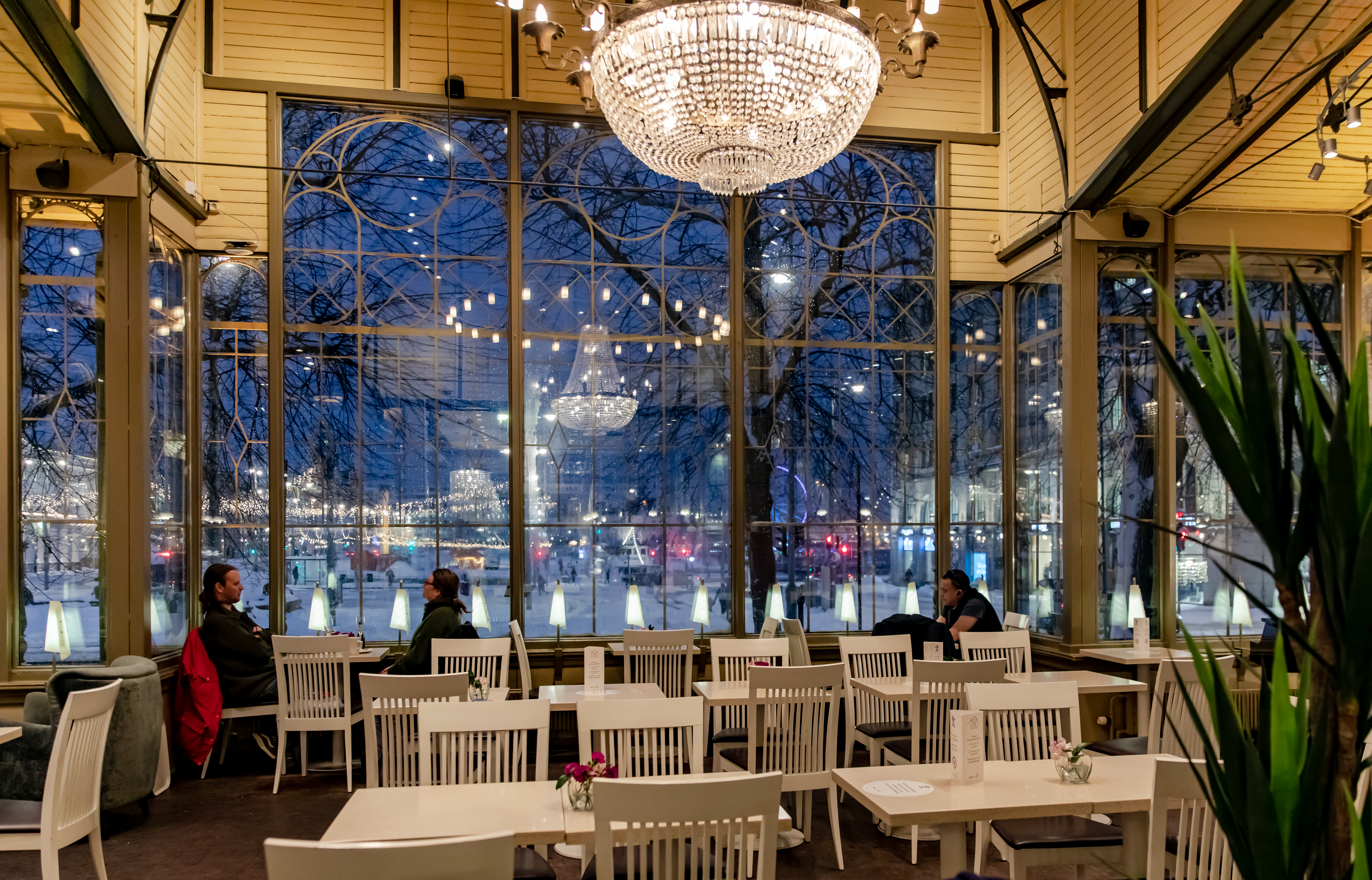
Interior of the restaurant

Kappeli (Finnish for "chapel"), also known as Esplanadikappeli, is a restaurant in central Helsinki, Finland at the eastern end of the Esplanadi park, opened in 1867. The restaurant was known as a local favourite among poets, writers and artists during the late 19th and early 20th centuries. In August 2020 the building changed ownership from the city of Helsinki to HOK-Elanto, who currently also owns the restaurant itself.

== History ==
The history of the restaurant started from a wooden pastry and lemonade kiosk built by confectioner Johan Daniel Jerngren at the Esplanadi park in 1840. The kiosk resembled a church or chapel, and so it was known as Kappeli ("the chapel"). Even before Jerngren's kiosk there had been a kiosk selling milk at the site, owned by a shepherd boy. The name Kappeli might originate from this period, as pastor is Latin for "shepherd", and because of this the kiosk might have been called a chapel. After Jerngren's kiosk deteriorated among time, a new restaurant building designed by architect Hampus Dalström was built at its place, opened on 4 June 1867. The kiosk's nickname moved on to the restaurant.

=== The Wolontis golden age ===
In 1883 the Lithuanian restaurateur Josef Wolontis became the new proprietor of the restaurant, managing it until 1904. Wolontis bought a beer chilling machine to the restaurant, and so the restaurant could sell cold beer throughout the summer. In 1887, a clam-shaped orchestra pavilion was built in front of the restaurant, where a military band conducted by Alexey Apostol performed for over 20 years. In 1891, the temporary wooden pavilions built in Wolontis's time in 1867 and 1881 were replaced by glass and iron pavilions designed by architect Bruno Granholm. At the same time, the kitchen and storage premises of the restaurant were moved to a cellar dug into the rock, where they stayed until 1931. In the late 19th century, Kappeli became a local favourite among artists, frequented by poet Eino Leino, writer Juhani Aho, artist Akseli Gallen-Kallela and composers Jean Sibelius and Oskar Merikanto.

=== Wall paintings ===
In restaurateur Onni Wetterhoff's time from 1877 to 1879, artists coming to the restaurant for Sunday breakfast in wintertime began decorating the walls of the restaurant as thanks for the food. Albert Edelfelt painted a picture of Gambrinus, known as the inventor of beer, on a round wall medallion at the kitchen of the reataurant, and Oskar Kleineh painted a picture of a street view in Rouen, France on the kitchen wall. The restaurant bar hosts the painting Merimaisema ("marine view") by Hjalmar Munsterhjelm, and the large Helsinki panorama on the cellar wall was probably painted by decorator painter Henrik Erland Salonen.

=== Later phases until today ===
In 1916 restaurant Kappeli changed into a summer restaurant which was not open at wintertime any more. The restaurateur Lundbom renovated the pavilion and the kitchen, and the restaurant has since been known for its good food. However, the restaurant building deteriorated among the years because of humidity and cold weather, as it was closed at wintertime. In 1939 the Eteläesplanadi facade of the restaurant was extended to both the west and the east, and a new orchestra pavilion designed by architect Valter Jung was built at the same time, remaining to this day. In the same year, the competition for fountain sculptures for the restaurant was won by sculptor Viktor Jansson. The corporate company Elanto took over as the tenant of the restaurant in 1976, and the restaurant was renovated for all-year use once again at the same time. In the 1980s Kappeli was one of the few restaurants in Helsinki staying open until four in the morning. Restaurant Kappeli was last renovated in 2011.

In August 2020 HOK-Elanto bought the restaurant for 20 million euro. The building is in need of fundamental repairs, costing several million euro.
