= Olo (restaurant) =

Restaurant in Helsinki, Finland

Coordinates: 60.1681°N 24.9549°E

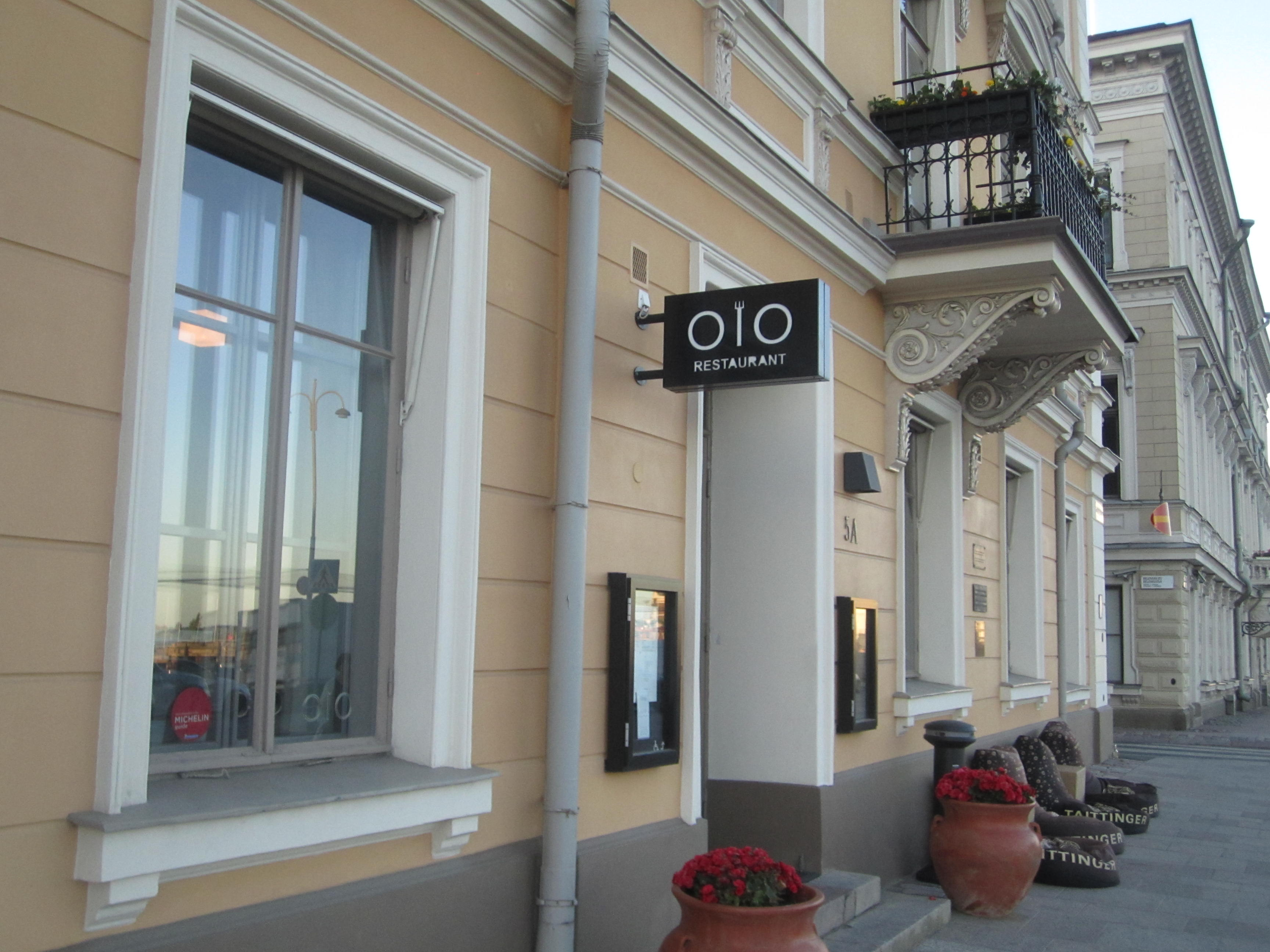
Olo

Olo is a fine-dining restaurant in Helsinki, Finland, founded by Pekka Terävä, Petri Lukkarinen, Mikko Heinonen and Teuvo Salminen in 2006. The Finnish gastronomical society chose Olo as the restaurant of the year in 2009.

The restaurant was originally operating at Kasarminkatu, and later moved to central Helsinki, to Pohjoisesplanadi by the Market Square. Olo received a Michelin star in 2011 and has retained this distinction (as of 2025). Operating in connection with the restaurant is the banquet and event venue Olo Garden & Bar, which opened in spring 2017. Like Olo itself, it is part of Olo Collection Oy, a company controlled by the founders.

In practice, Olo’s operations are overseen by head chef Tuomas Vierelä and restaurateur Katja Henttunen.

The Olo Collection group also includes the restaurants Emo, Ego, Brasa, Cocktailbar Blanda, Särkänlinna, Scolare, wine bar Banco Vini, Pizzeria Forza, and Olo Creative Catering (Helsinki). In 2024, the restaurant group had a turnover of 11 million euros and employed 125 people. The operating profit for the financial year was 0.8 million euros.
