= Savoie (disambiguation) =

Savoie is a French department in the Auvergne-Rhône-Alpes region of the French Alps.

Savoie may also refer to:

- Haute-Savoie, a French department in the Auvergne-Rhône-Alpes region of the French Alps.
- Pays de Savoie, the name used for both departments as a whole entity
- Croix de Savoie Gaillard, a football club
- French ironclad Savoie, a French Navy ship
- Mouvement Région Savoie, a French regionalist political party
- Tomme de Savoie, a variety of cheese
- University of Savoie, in alpine eastern France
- Savoy wine, a French wine region east of Rhône.

== People with the surname ==
- Calixte Savoie (1895–1985), Canadian businessman, school principal, teacher, and politician
- Christian Savoie (born 1976), Canadian strongman
- Claude Savoie (politician) (1916–1990), Canadian politician
- Claude Savoie (policeman) (1943–1992), Canadian policeman
- Denise Savoie (born 1943), Canadian politician
- Dennis Savoie, Canadian ambassador
- Donald J. Savoie (born 1947), Canadian professor in public administration and regional economic development
- Donat Savoie, Canadian anthropologist
- Evan Drake Savoie (born 1990), American murderer
- François-Théodore Savoie (1846–1921), Canadian politician
- Glen Savoie, Canadian politician
- Hidulphe Savoie, Canadian general merchant and political figure from New Brunswick
- Jean-Paul Savoie (1947–2023), Canadian social worker and politician from New Brunswick
- Jonathan Savoie, Canadian photographer
- Joseph-Alcide Savoie (1872–1933), Canadian politician
- Matthew Savoie (figure skater) (born 1980), American figure skater
- Matthew Savoie (ice hockey) (born 2004), Canadian ice hockey player
- Nicky Savoie (born 1973), American football player
- Réjean Savoie (born 1952), Canadian businessman and political figure from New Brunswick
- René Savoie (1896–1961), Swiss ice hockey player
- Robert Savoie (1927–2007), French-Canadian operatic baritone
- Roger Savoie (1931–2009), Canadian football defensive lineman
- Stéphanie Savoie (born 1989), Canadian baseball player

== See also ==
- Communes of the Savoie department
- Savoy (disambiguation)
