= Savoyard =

Savoyard refers to:

== Regional and political ==
- Savoyard dialect, a Franco-Provençal language
- Savoyard League, a political party based in the Savoy region of France
- A member of the House of Savoy, the ruling dynasty of the Duchy of Savoy, a medieval and early modern state
  - Savoyard state, collective term for states ruled by the Duke of Savoy
- A resident of Savoie, a department in France
- A resident of Haute-Savoie, a department in France
- The Savoyard faction was within the Thirteenth Century English Royal Court centred around Eleanor of Provence

== The arts ==
- American Savoyards, a former light opera company
- Washington Savoyards, a former light opera company
- Fans of the Savoy operas
- Members of the D'Oyly Carte Opera Company, which performed at the Savoy Theatre
- The Savoyard, the former magazine of the D'Oyly Carte Opera Company

== Other uses ==
- Savoyard (grape), an Italian wine grape also known as the Dolcetto
- Savoyard Centre, an office building in Detroit, Michigan

== See also ==
- Savoy (disambiguation)
