= Else Mayer =

German religious sister (1891–1962)

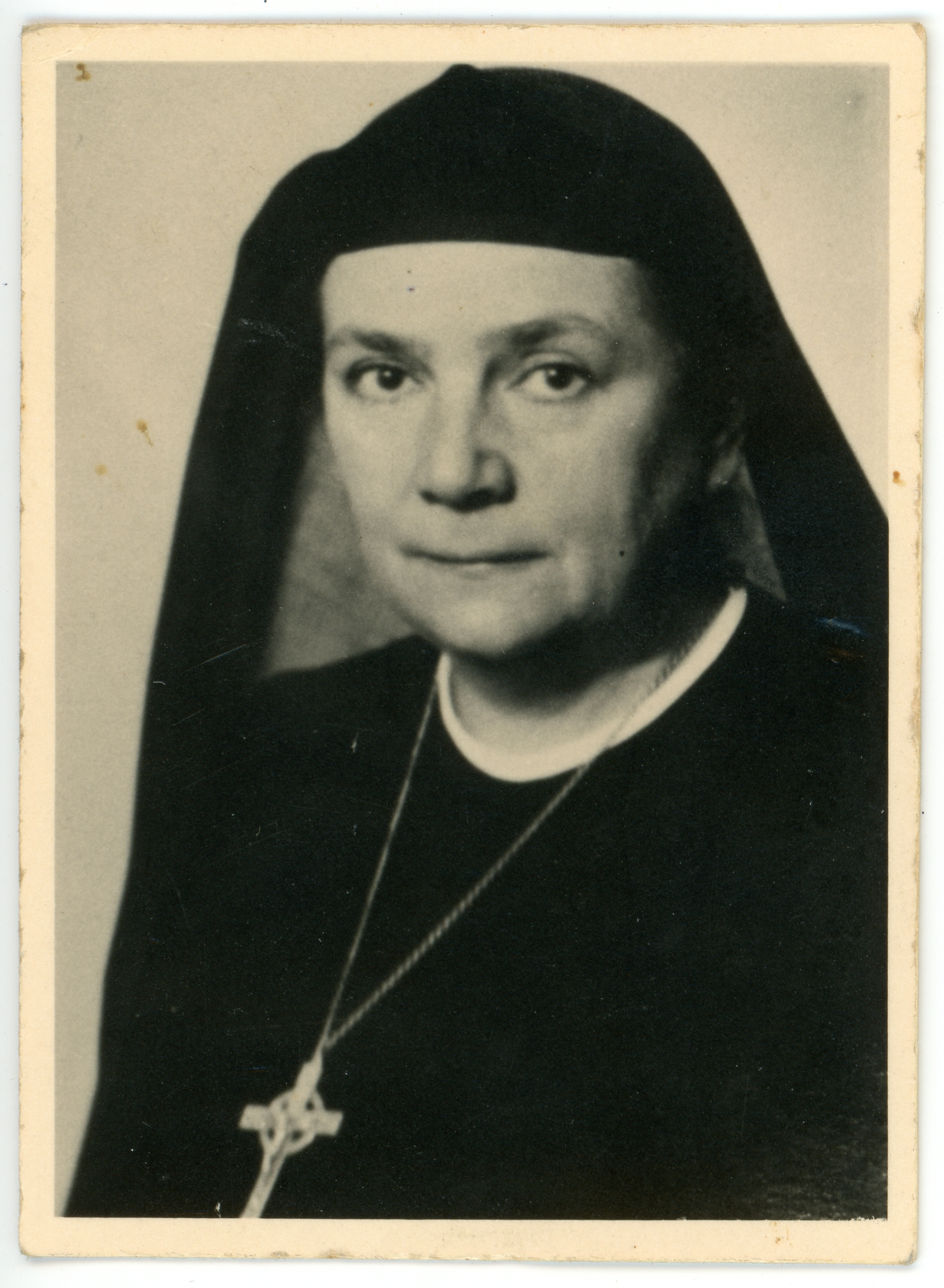
- Else Mayer in the religious habit of the Erlöserbund, ca. 1960
- Born: 1891
- Died: 1962 (aged 70–71)

Else Mayer (1891–1962) was a German religious sister and a women's liberation activist during the period of first-wave feminism. She was one of the pioneers of the German Women's Liberation Movement. Together with Alexandra Bischoff she founded the Erlöserbund.

== Biography ==
Else Mayer was the daughter of the German jeweler Victor Mayer. She spent her childhood and youth in the family business before she became a religious sister. After she visited several convents, she decided to found the Erlöserbund, a congregation of episcopal right, in 1916. With the support of her family, she bought buildings in Bonn and started to support young female students who received housing from her.

The Erlöserbund was abandoned in 2005 and turned into a charitable foundation. The Else Mayer Foundation presents an annual award, the Else Mayer Award, to applicants who are deemed to qualify as ideological successors to Else Mayer. The award is for 4000 euros. The then-Education Minister of Germany, Annette Schavan, was the inaugural recipient of this award in 2006. The German feminist Alice Schwarzer received the award in 2007.

== Legacy ==
In her hometown of Pforzheim, Germany, the Else-Mayer-Schule is named in honour of her. The school was founded in 2012 as a private, state-recognised vocational school and offers training programmes in social care, including qualifications in social-pedagogical assistance and everyday support services. Its educational focus lies on inclusion, social participation, and facilitating access to the labour market, particularly for learners with non-linear educational backgrounds or special support needs.

== Publications ==
- The Donation Else Mayer ISBN 3-00-020628-0/ISBN 978-3-00-020628-3
- Mohr-Mayer, Herbert; Mohr, Victor: Die Stiftung Else Mayer. Bonn: Stiftung Else Mayer (Selbstverlag), 2006.
- Else Mayer Award
- Bonn Newspaper
