= Herbert Mohr-Mayer =

German jeweller (born 1933)

Herbert Mohr-Mayer (born 22 September 1933) is a German jeweler and author who was president of Victor Mayer Co. from 1965 to 2005. He continued the legacy of the Russian jeweler Peter Carl Fabergé.

He was born to the jeweler Edmund Mohr and his wife Maria Mayer in Pforzheim, Germany. His grandfather was the German jeweler Victor Mayer who founded the Victor Mayer jewelry company in Pforzheim in 1890. Another famed family member is his brother the computer pioneer Manfred Mohr.

Mohr-Mayer's childhood was overshadowed by the bombing of Pforzheim in 1945 during World War II. The dramatic event took the lives of many of his childhood friends and destroyed 83% of the inner city. The building he grew up in which also housed the Victor Mayer Co. remained miraculously untouched by the disaster.

In 1960, he obtained a PhD in business administration at LMU Munich, then he worked with jewelers Asprey in London and Altenloh, Brussels until 1964. There he refined his taste and skills in jewelry making.

In 1965, he and Hubert Mayer became owners of the Victor Mayer Jewelry manufacturing company in Pforzheim.

Mohr-Mayer turned the Victor Mayer company over to his son Marcus O. Mohr in 2001 and retired from his position in 2003. Mohr-Mayer continues to represent the Fabergé workmaster at events of the Collegium Fabergé and gives lectures on the history and making of Fabergé eggs.

Mohr-Mayer is also a nephew of the German women's lib activist Else Mayer. He became instrumental in turning her nunnery in Bonn into a charitable foundation. Herbert Mohr-Mayer has been volunteering in the Else Mayer Foundation since 2004.

== Restoring the Fabergé line ==
Herbert Mohr-Mayer revived the Fabergé line, which had been discontinued by the heirs of Peter Carl Fabergé. The grandsons of Fabergé sold the licensing rights to Fabergé Co. in 1989. In the same year, Fabergé Inc. appointed Victor Mayer as the new licensee. After years of research in the fields of traditional jewelry making Mohr-Mayer reestablished long-lost manufacturing techniques such as guilloché and vitreous enamel. In 1991, the company presented the first Fabergé-line object since the closing of the Fabergé workshop in 1917.

Fabergé objects from the house of Victor Mayer have been acquired by the Kremlin Museum, the Art Museum of New Orleans, and many private collections around the world.

== See also ==
- Gorbachev Peace Egg

== Publications by Mohr-Mayer ==
- Mohr-Mayer, Herbert (2005). Geza von Habsburg, Fabergé gestern und heute. Hirner, München. ISBN 978-3777424651.
- Mohr-Mayer, Herbert (2007). Victor Mayer (1857-1947) "Sozial, humorvoll und schaffig.". Verlag Regional Kultur. ISBN 978-3-89735-511-8.
- Mohr-Mayer, Herbert (2010). Von Goldenen Eiern und anderen Pretiosen. Verlag Regional Kultur. ISBN 978-3-89735-620-7.
- Mohr-Mayer, Herbert (2021). Meine Jugend im Dritten Reich.
- Martin Mohr, Bernhard Mohr, Mohr-Mayer, Herbert (2024). Wenn Schweigen bricht. Books on Demand, Nordstedt. ISBN 978-3-7583-0998-4.
- Mohr-Mayer, Herbert (2025). Himmel aus Feuer.
