= Savoy (restaurant) =

Restaurant in Helsinki

Coordinates: 60°10′1.09″N 24°56′50.25″E

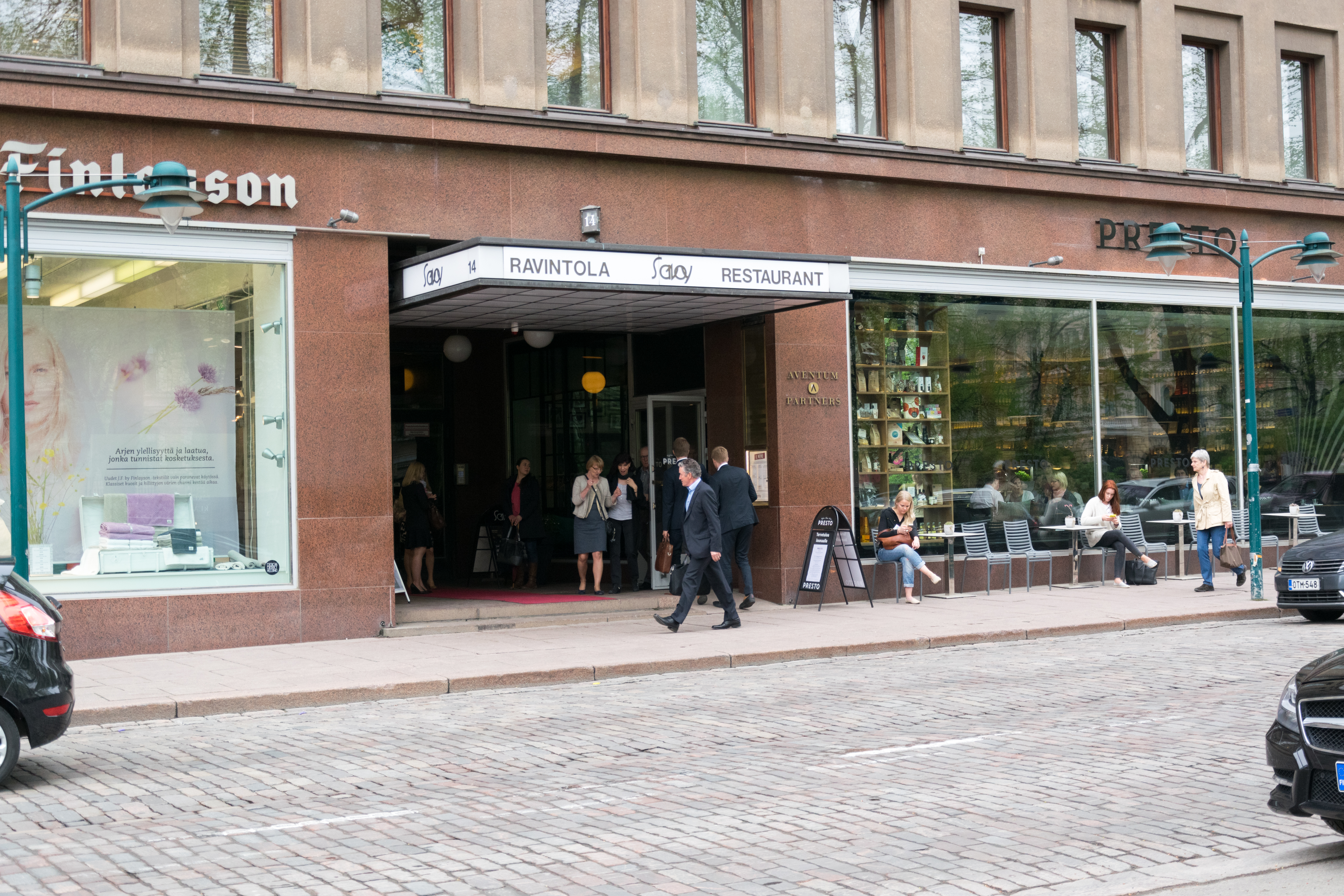
The main entrance to Savoy.

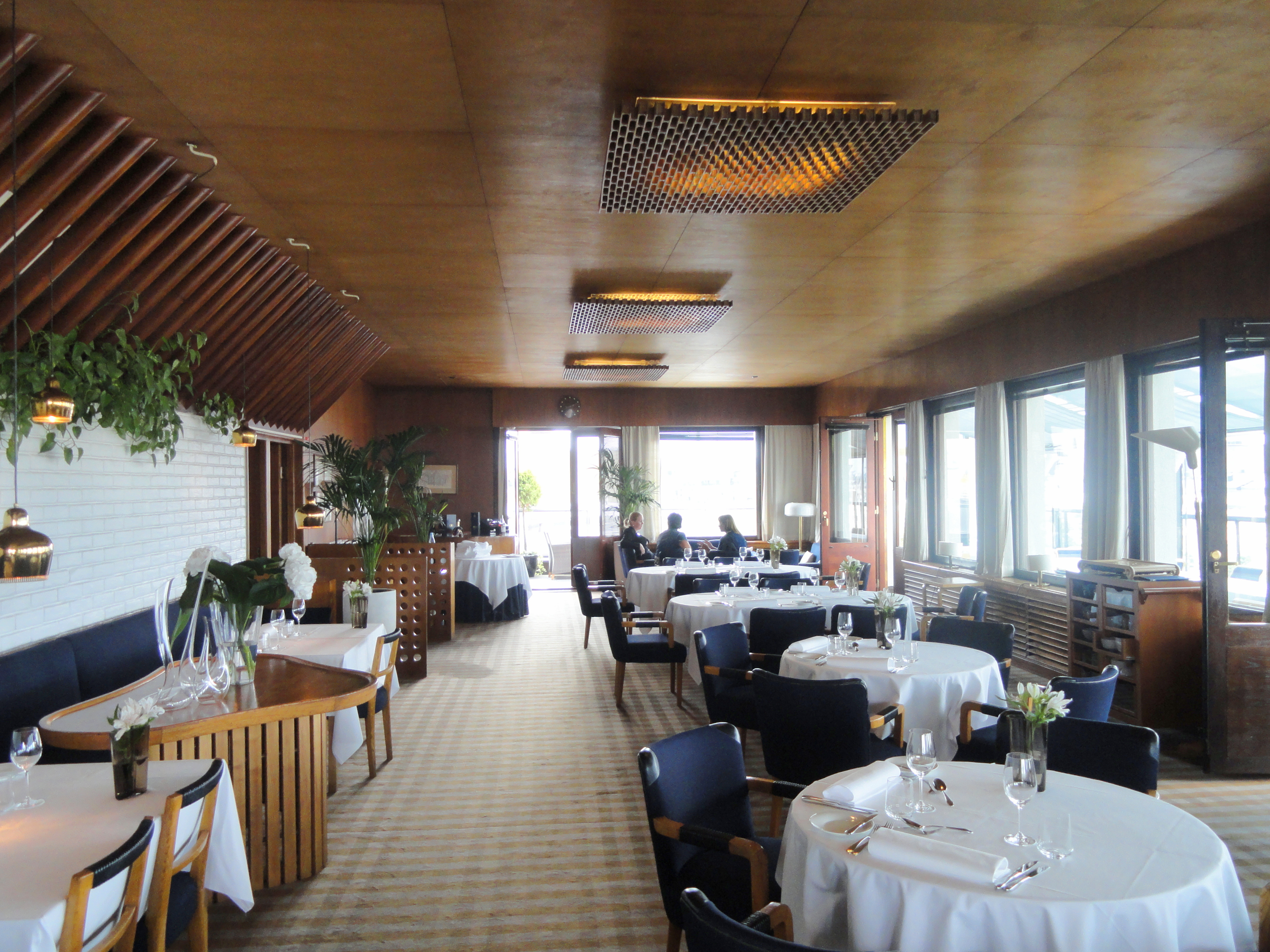
Interior of the restaurant.

Savoy is a restaurant in Helsinki, Finland, located on the Eteläesplanadi street. The restaurant opened on 3 June 1937. It is located in a space designed by Finnish architects Aino and Alvar Aalto, and furnished by the company Artek, which they had founded two years earlier. It was renovated in 2019. The Savoy is considered a hallmark of Finnish cuisine.

The main restaurant hall of Savoy is long and narrow, resembling a tram or a saloon on a ship. The original functionalist interior has been mostly preserved: plywood, wood, slammed brick. The restaurant is also known by the nicknames "Aalto's stable", "giraffe stable" and "elephant stable". The windows on the restaurant hall on the street side have a view to the Esplanadi park. The ground floor has a celebration space. At the time of its opening in 1937, Savoy had four elevators and an air conditioning device keeping the hall clean of cigar smoke, which was unusual at the time.

== History ==
The first restaurateurs of Savoy were the Swedish-born Gustav Rasmussen and Runar Björklund, who was also known as the elite athlete "Pixen". Both of them also had other restaurants in Helsinki. Gustaf Rasmussen, who had previously worked at the restaurant Hasselbacken in Stockholm, Sweden, was the chief restaurateur. Savoy has since been managed by Arctia (originally known as "Yhtyneet Ravintolat"), Scandic Hotels and Royal Ravintolat since March 1999.

The traditions and reputation of Savoy are mostly based on its famous clients. The most famous of them was Field Marshal Carl Gustaf Emil Mannerheim, who had his first lunch at Savoy two days after its opening and stayed as a regular guest. The Marshal had just had his 70th birthday at the time. Mannerheim told the restaurant he did not want to hear any recommendations from the chief cook.

It is still possible to sit at the Marshal's table at Savoy and eat vorschmack served with pickles and beetroot, whose recipe is said to come from Mannerheim himself, who saw it at the Officer's Club in Warsaw, Poland, and drink the famous ice-cold, clear schnapps named after Mannerheim. In summer 1977 a photograph of Mannerheim and a small plaque mentioning Mannerheim as a regular guest was hung on the wall near the corner table.

One time, when long-time Finnish politician Paavo Väyrynen visited the restaurant with his entourage, the staff told him "This will take a while, there was an accident in the kitchen". Väyrynen replied "I don't mind, I can give a speech while we're waiting".

Another famous guest of Savoy was James Bond actor Roger Moore. When Moore arrived at the restaurant, he told the staff he wanted to eat there incognito without anyone recognising him. However, no one told the restaurant pianist about this, and when he started playing the "James Bond Theme", everyone present recognised Moore.

== Honours ==
The Finnish Gastronomic Society has chosen Savoy as Restaurant of the Year in 1999 and 2007.

Restaurant Savoy has been awarded the Nordic swan environmental award.

The ceramic artist Karin Widnäs has designed the hand-made cutlery For Savoy for the restaurant. It has 16 parts and was partly designed by Savoy's chief cook Kari Aihinen. The cutlery is white and has a simple shape. It is part of Helsinki's period as design capital of the world.

== See also ==
- Aalto Vase

== Sources ==
- History of the restaurant
- A. Ahlström AB main office at the City Museum of Helsinki
