= Terminal 5 (exhibition) =

2004 art exhibition in New York City

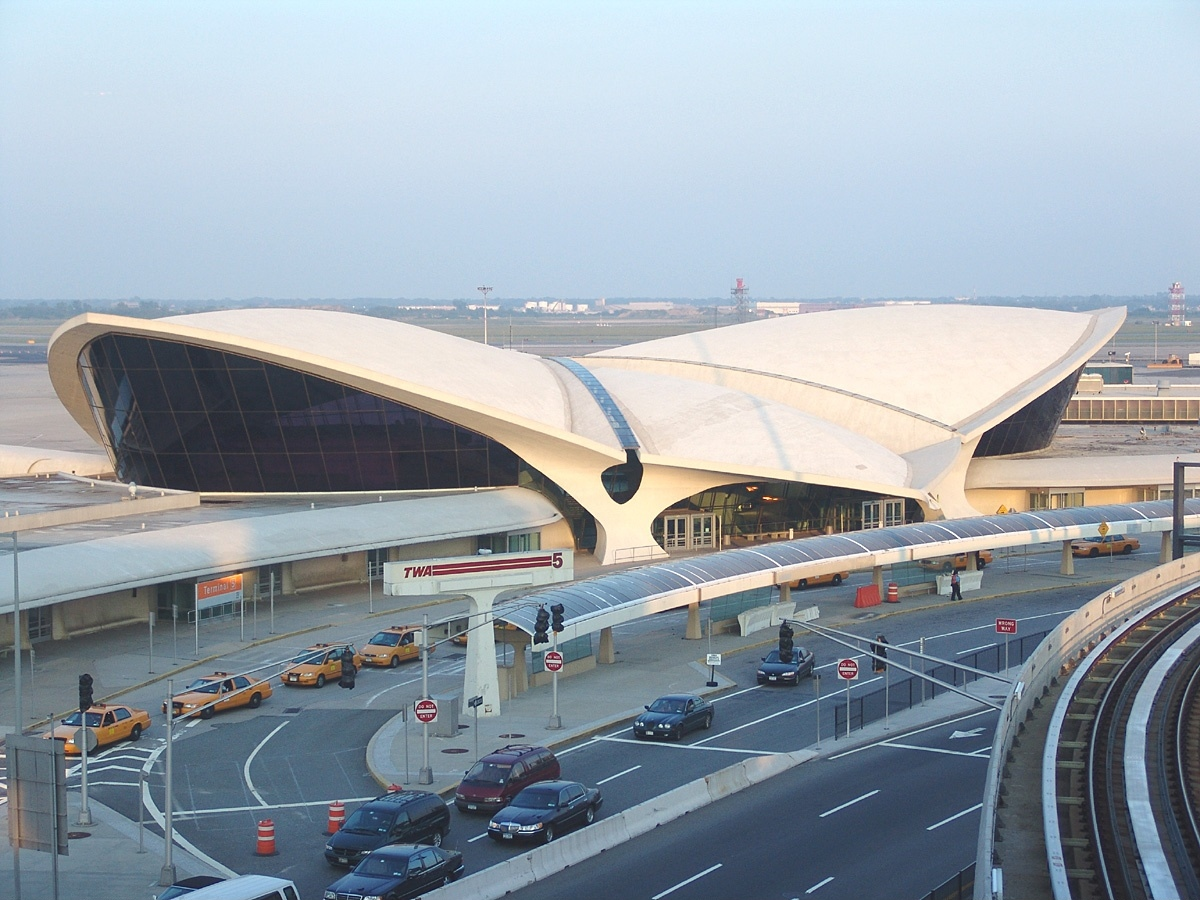
TWA Flight Center in June 2004

Terminal 5 was an art exhibition that took place in October 2004 at the then-disused TWA Flight Center at John F. Kennedy International Airport in Queens, New York City. The New York City Landmarks Preservation Commission had designated both the interior and the exterior of the terminal, designed by Eero Saarinen, as a historic landmark in 1994, but following TWA's continued financial deterioration during the 1990s and eventual purchase by American Airlines, the terminal had ended operations in October 2001 and entered a period of disuse.

Curated by Rachel K. Ward, Terminal 5 showed the work of 19 artists from 10 countries including Jenny Holzer, Scott Indrisek, Dan Graham, Vanessa Beecroft, Tom Sachs, Tobias Wong, Douglas Coupland, Mark Handforth, Anri Sala, Sean Linezo, Jonas Mekas, Aleksandra Mir, Jonathan Monk, Toland Grinnell, Kendell Geers, Ryoji Ikeda, and Jennifer & Kevin McCoy. The exhibit included sculptures, audio installations, lectures and temporary installations drawing inspiration from the idea of travel as well as the terminal's architecture.

Originally planned to run from October 1, 2004, to January 31, 2005, it closed abruptly after the opening event when a runway-side door was opened by a guest, thereby breaching airport security and creating a public risk. Since the exhibition, portions of the original complex have been demolished, and the Saarinen terminal (or head house) has been renovated, partially encircled by and serving as a ceremonial entrance to T5, a new adjacent terminal completed in 2008.
