= Victor Mayer =

German jewellery designer (1857–1946)

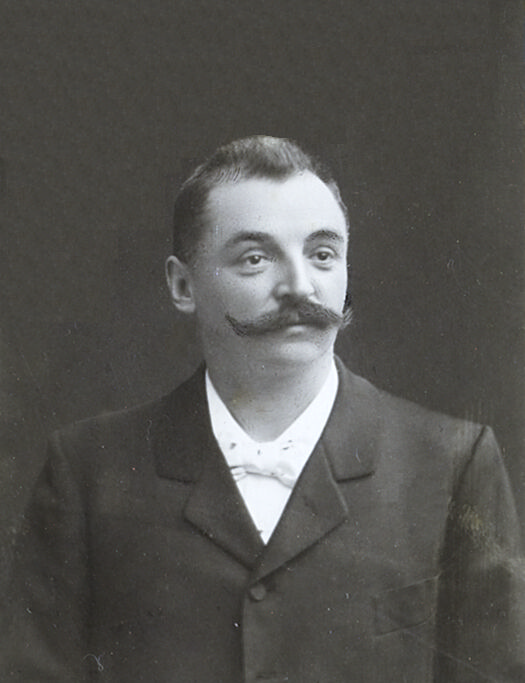
Victor Mayer about 1895

Victor Mayer (1857 in Pforzheim – 1946) founded the jewellery manufacture Victor Mayer in Pforzheim in 1890. In the time of Jugendstil / Art Nouveau, the company created pieces based on the designs of well-known artists such as the jewellery designer Professor Georg Kleemann or Anton Krautheimer of the Munich Secession. In the art deco period and in the 1950s the manufacture focused mainly on fine gold and silver ware. From the 1970s onwards again more jewellery was manufactured. Until 1988 the company produced Fabergé jewelry for Fabergé & Cie in Paris with the label 'Fabergé Paris'. From 1925 until 2009, the company continued to produce Fabergé jewelry under license from Unilever New York until the brand license was sold. The manufacture Victor Mayer is well known for its high-end jewellery and the preservation of historical artisan techniques such as authentic fire enamel or guilloché.

== Life ==
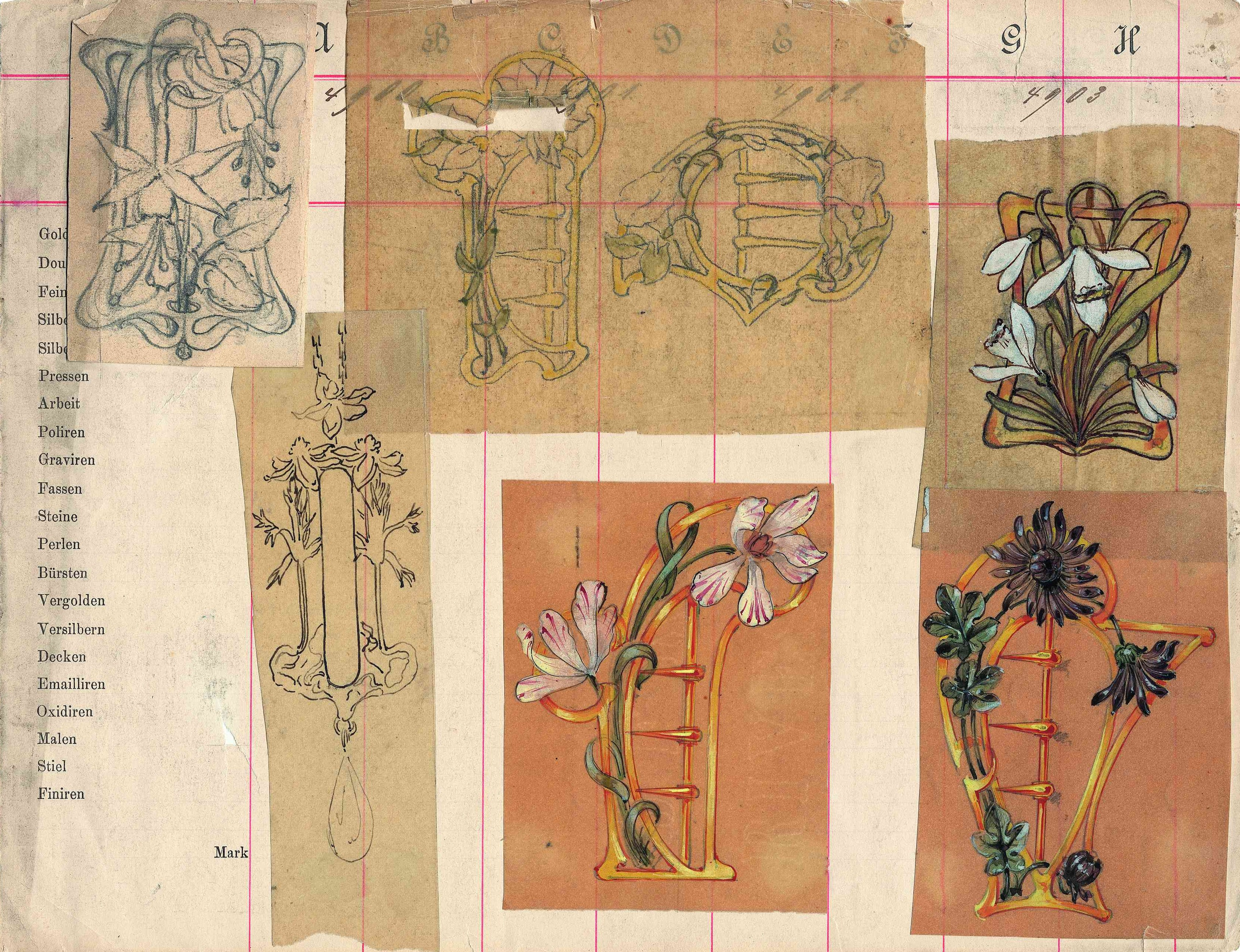
Designs of Art Nouveau jewellery and belt buckles, drawn about 1903 by Victor Mayer

Victor Mayer was born in 1857 into a family of thriving entrepreneurs. His father Eduard Mayer (1814–1881) owned a hostel "Zum Kreuz" in Pforzheim. His grandfather Balthasar Mayer (1779–1849) owned an apothecary in Haigerloch. Between 1872 and 1877, Victor Mayer served as an apprentice where he underwent the training to become a steel engraver. Then he became one of the first students at the Pforzheim Arts and Crafts School (Pforzheimer Kunstgewerbeschule) founded in 1877 by Grand Duke Friedrich I. After having completed his military service from 1879 until 1882, he could finally set off for a three-year stay in Vienna, which he had planned for a long time. There he gained valuable experience in enamelling and guilloché-engraving, sophisticated techniques which are still being used at the manufacture Victor Mayer today. After returning to Pforzheim, he continued his studies at the Grand Duke’s Art and Crafts School and received significant commendations in drawing, modelling and design. In 1890 he married Lina née Niemand. In the same year he founded the jewellery company Vogel & Mayer in Pforzheim together with the merchant Herrmann Vogel. Herrmann Vogel left the company in 1895 after conflict arose between the partners, and Victor Mayer continued the business alone under his own name. In 1932 he withdrew from operative business and handed over his shares in equal parts to his son Oskar Mayer and his son in law Edmund Mohr. Victor Mayer died in Pforzheim on 13 October 1946.

== Creative Works ==
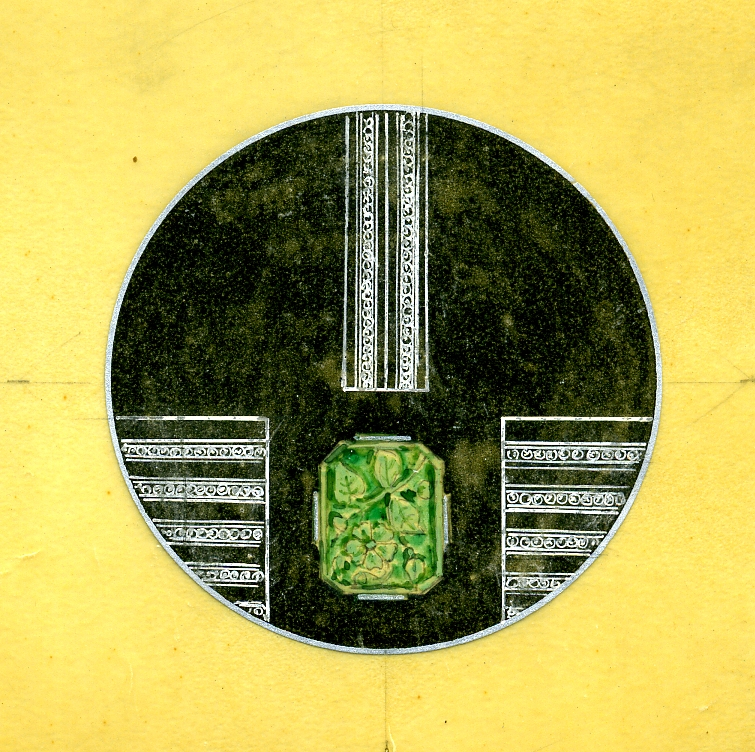
Design of an Art Déco powder compact, drawn in the nineteenthirties by Victor Mayer

Victor Mayer‘s creative works embrace four periods. He began in 1885 in the style of historicism at the Arts and Crafts School in Pforzheim, progressing towards the Jugendstil / Art Nouveau in the early 1900s, moving on to Art Deco after the First World War. With his late avant-garde designs created after 1940, he pointed the way forward to the 1950s. Documents from the company’s archives show that Victor Mayer continued to make significant contributions to the manufacture’s creative designs until short before his death; in 1945 at the age of 88 he designed numerous pieces of jewellery which sold very well until in the 1960s.

== Company history ==
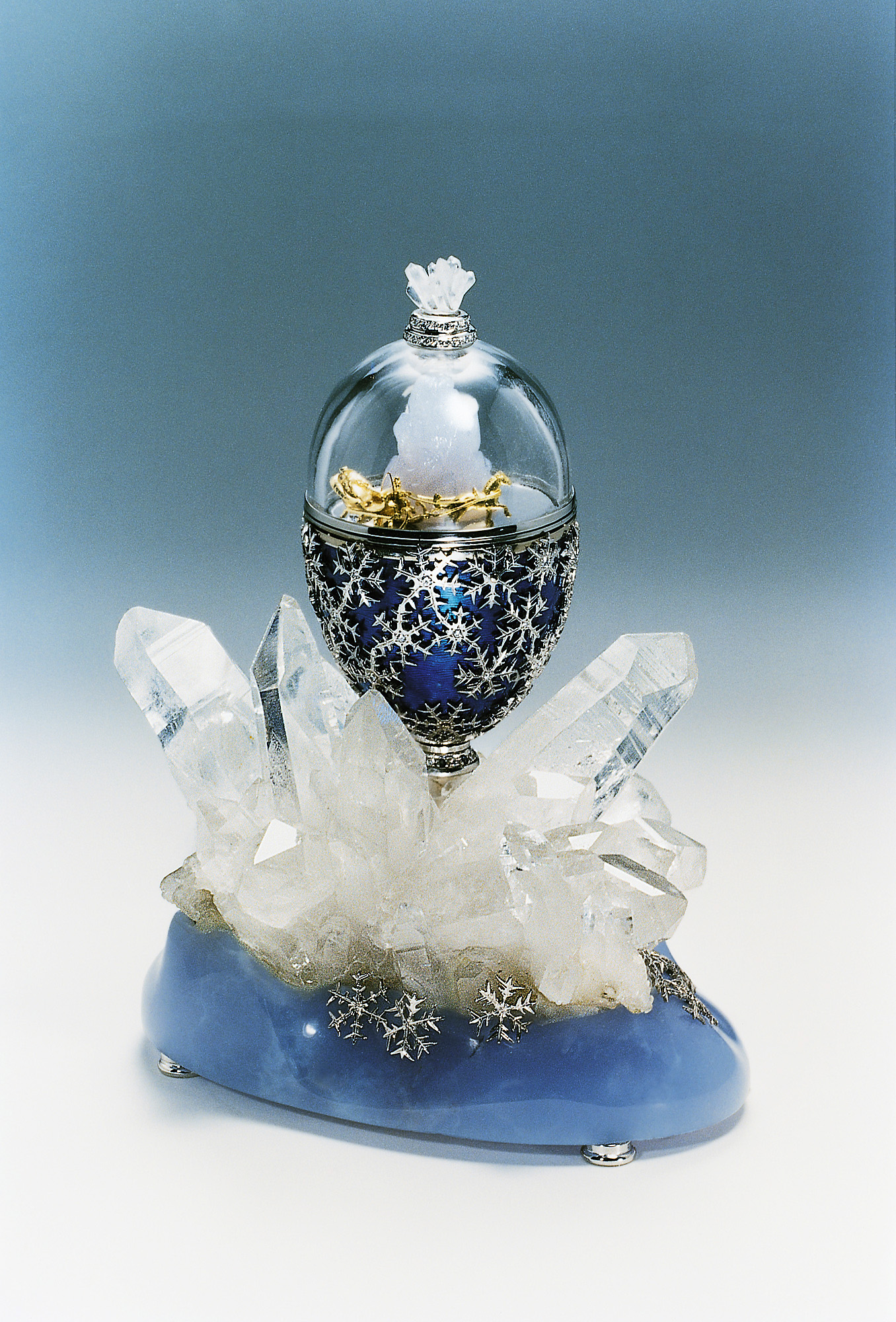
Fabergé Winter-Egg, designed and manufactured in 1997 by Victor Mayer GmbH & Co. KG, Pforzheim/Germany

The manufacture Mayer GmbH & Co. KG was founded in 1890 by Victor Mayer and Herrmann Vogel. After Herrmann Vogel had left the company in 1895, Victor Mayer continued the business alone under his name. His two oldest sons, Victor and Julius, died in World War I. They had been designated to take over the company management from the founder. Now two of the remaining children, Maria and Oskar Mayer, had to assume the commercial tasks in the company, while Victor Mayer was in charge of the technical management and design. Maria married Edmund Mohr, who became an individually liable partner and co-owner of the company in 1925. In 1932 Victor Mayer withdrew from operative business and handed over his shares in equal parts to his only remaining son Oskar Mayer and his son in law Edmund Mohr. Until 1965 Oskar Mayer and Edmund Mohr were equal partners and responsible co-owners of the company. In this year the two grandsons of Victor Mayer, Herbert Mohr-Mayer and his cousin Hubert Mayer, took over the management of the company. When Hubert died unexpectedly in 1989, Herbert purchased the original shares held by his cousin to become sole proprietor of the manufacture. In 1989 the company obtained the licence to manufacture Fabergé jewellery and objects of art and achieved great success with these pieces until 2009.

In 2003 Herbert Mohr-Mayer left the company and his son Marcus Oliver Mohr became creative director and managing partner. Marcus was appointed a workmaster for Faberge and continues to create guilloche enamel jewellery and objects of art for Fabergé Ltd., London.

== Fabergé exhibitions ==
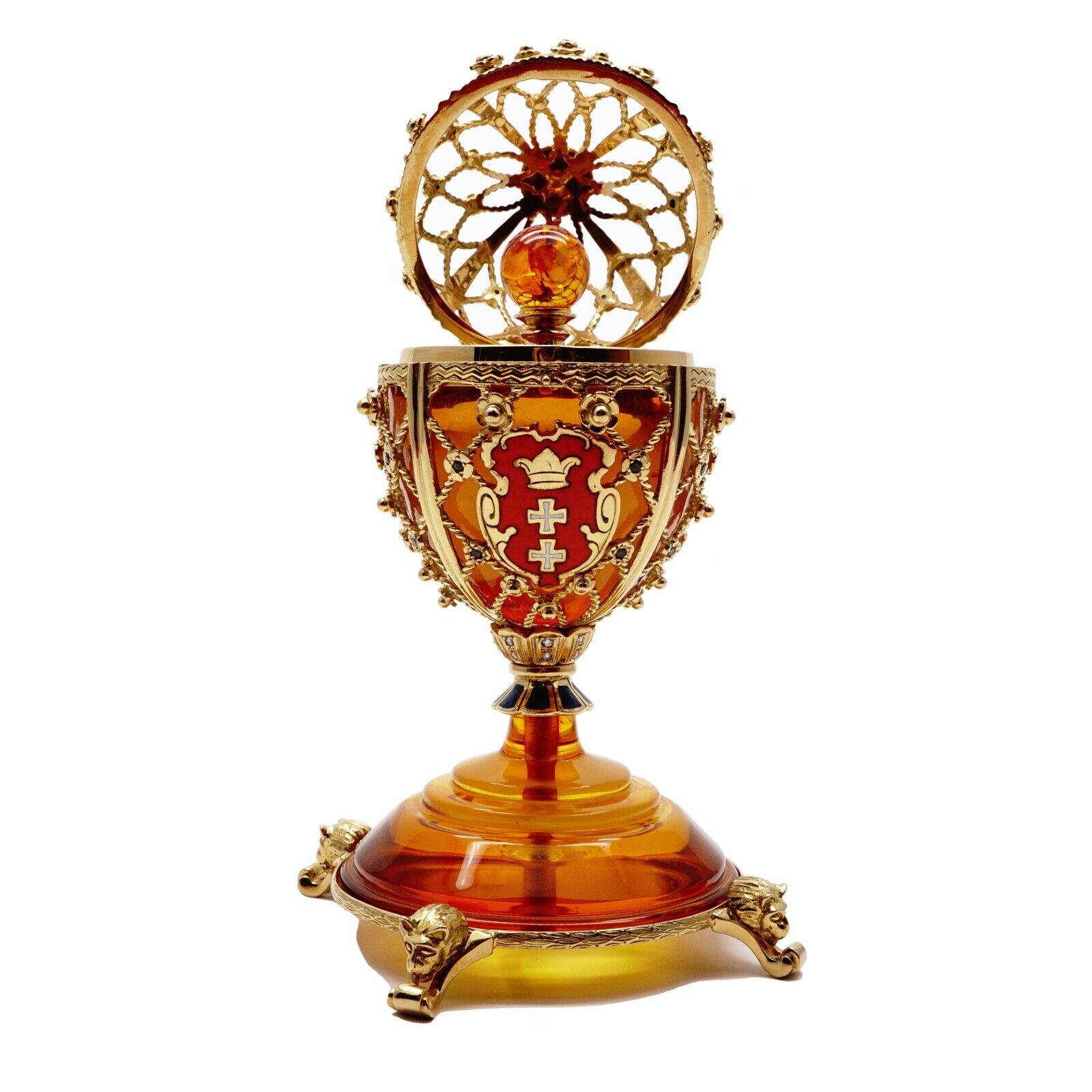
Fabergé Gdansk or Millennium Amber Egg, designed and manufactured in 1996

In 1996 Fabergé jewellery by Victor Mayer was shown together with the works of Peter Carl Fabergé at the Metropolitan Museum, New York. The collection of Fabergé Eggs was the center piece of the Russian Pavilion at Expo 2000 in Hannover, Germany. "Faberge. A Return To Russia" was the name of an exhibition staged at the Moscow Kremlin's Armory in 2001. On display were some thirty pieces of jewelry created by Victor Mayer. The Fabergé Amber Egg is the centerpiece of the Amber Museum in Gdansk, Poland. Ewa Rachon, the Director of Amberif, ordered the egg to be created for the city of Gdansk in 1996.
