= List of rural localities in the Republic of Karelia =

Map of Russia with Karelia highlighted

This is a list of rural localities in the Republic of Karelia. The Republic of Karelia (Russian: Респу́блика Каре́лия, romanized: Respublika Kareliya, IPA: [rʲɪˈspublʲɪkə kɐˈrʲelʲɪ(j)ə]; Karelian: Karjalan tazavaldu; Finnish: Karjalan tasavalta; Veps: Karjalan Tazovaldkund) is a federal subject of Russia (a republic), located in the northwest of Russia. Its capital is the city of Petrozavodsk. Its population in 2010 was 643,548.

== Belomorsky District ==
Rural localities in Belomorsky District:

- Nyukhcha

== Kemsky District ==
Rural localities in Kemsky District:

- 14 km dorogi Kem-Kalevala
- 6 km dorogi Kem-Kalevala
- Panozero

== Kondopozhsky District ==
Rural localities in Kondopozhsky District:

- Unitsa

== Kostomuksha ==
Rural localities in Kostomuksha urban okrug:

- Voknavolok

== Lakhdenpokhsky District ==
Rural localities in Lakhdenpokhsky District:

- Elisenvaara
- Khiytola
- Soryo
- Yakkima

== Loukhsky District ==
Rural localities in Loukhsky District:

- Kestenga

== Medvezhyegorsky District ==
Rural localities in Medvezhyegorsky District:

- Shunga
- Velikaya Guba

== Muyezersky District ==
Rural localities in Muyezersky District:

- Ledmozero
- Reboly
- Rugozero

== Olonetsky District ==
Rural localities in Olonetsky District:

- Ilyinsky
- Immalitsy
- Mikhaylovskoye
- Tuksa

== Pitkyarantsky District ==
Rural localities in Pitkyarantsky District:

- Impilakhti
- Lyaskelya
- Salmi

== Prionezhsky District ==
Rural localities in Prionezhsky District:

- Besovets
- Shyoltozero

== Pryazhinsky District ==
Rural localities in Pryazhinsky District:

- Kinerma
- Kolatselga
- Sodder
- Vedlozero

== Pudozhsky District ==
Rural localities in Pudozhsky District:

- Avdeyevo

== Segezhsky District ==
Rural localities in Segezhsky District:

- Kochkoma

== Sortavala ==
Rural localities in Sortavala urban okrug:

- Kaalamo
- Ruskeala

== Suoyarvsky District ==
Rural localities in Suoyarvsky District:

- Naistenjärvi
- Porosozero

== See also ==
- Lists of rural localities in Russia
