= Olonets (disambiguation) =

Olonets is a town in the Republic of Karelia, Russia

Olonets may also refer to:

- Olonets Governorate, a governorate of the Russian Empire
- Olonets Viceroyalty, a viceroyalty of the Russian Empire bordering Vologda Viceroyalty
- Olonets Oblast, a division of the Russian Empire, originally in Novgorod Viceroyalty
- Olonets Isthmus, an isthmus in Russia between Lakes Onega and Ladoga
- Olonets Karelian language, another name for the Livvi-Karelian language
- Olonets subdialect, a subdialect in the group of the Northern Russian dialects
- Olonets, a fictional language on Helliconia a fictional planet by Brian Aldiss

== See also ==
- Olonetsky (disambiguation)
