= Ushkovayzet =

Evangelical Christians in Russia

Ushkovayzet (Finnish: uskovaiset, lit. 'believers', Russian: ушковайзет) were an Evangelical group of Orthodox Christian Baltic Finns in Russia. The missionary activity of the Laestadians had significant influence on its formation. Like the Laestadians, the Ushkovayzet did not leave their original Christian communities. Supporters of the movement often stayed within existing Orthodox congregations. However, their focus was largely on Evangelical methods such as lay-preaching, translating the Gospel into the vernacular, and so on.

== History ==
The movement emerged in Northern Russia in the early 19th century. The movement's founders were the Karelian boxmakers Grigory Bogdanov and Semyon Pyalliev, and the Finns Karl, David and Johan Tauriainen. In the mid-1870s, it gained prominence in the village of Ukhta (modern Kalevala). Their teachings spread amongst the Orthodox Karelian population and elsewhere in the Kemsky District, where the village is located. In Ukhta and Voynitsa, there were at least 500 followers of the movement.

In Ukhta on 18 August 1879, provincial authorities arrested six people: two residents of Ukhta named Alexei Pyalliev and Timofey Tikhonov, a Karelian from Voynitsa named Vasily Malikin and three Finns; the brothers David and Johan Venberg and their acquaintance Kaarlo Tauriainen. The rest of the village was intimidated by authorities. The six men were convicted of seducing Orthodox believers and sent to the local prison in Kem. After two months in prison, the men were released. The sect however, continued to be and confession books in the early 20th century suggest there were sectarian Ushkovayzet in the Kemsky District: one in Panozero, a family of four in Voynitsa and 20 people in Ukhta.

Not much is known about the Ushkovayzet movement in its later period. It is thought that the sect, not getting support nor understanding from the local population simply faded away over time.

== Hekhulites ==
Hekhulites, or Hikhkhulites (Finnish: Hihhulit), were a charismatic sub-movement within the Ushkovayzet movement. The nickname Hikhkhulite, in a similar way to Quakers or Shakers, was coined by outsiders who noted that during their worship, they seem to become so inspired by the Holy Spirit that they began to jump in ecstasy and utter sounds which sounded like hekh-hekh.

== Doctrine ==
Followers of the Ushkovayzet movement considered themselves true believers and referred to those outside the movement as pagans or idolaters. They urged followers to repent from sins such as drunkenness and laziness. And rejected many sacraments of the Orthodox Church, believing in a similar principle to sola fide regarding salvation. However, unlike Old Believers, many in the Ushkovayzet movement acknowledged baptism and marriage within the Orthodox Church and attended some services in church. The movement's followers did not venerate the apostles, saints, holy relics or icons. And they did not observe fasting nor make the sign of the cross. Their doctrine taught that each member was capable of preaching like the apostles, as each had the Holy Spirit within them. The sacrament of confession before or with a priest was also rejected on the basis of the Apostle James: "Therefore confess your sins to one another." (James 5:16). Instead confessing amongst themselves within the congregation. The rejected ritualism, icons, fasting, sacraments, clergy and considered formal church buildings to be unnecessary, reading selections from the Holy Scriptures at their own gatherings instead.

== Sources ==
- Vitukhnovskaya M. Russian Karelia and the Karelians in the Imperial Politics of Russia, 1905–1917. P. 113.
- Pulkin M. V. Petrozavodsk. The Activity of the Sect "Ushkovait" // Traditional Culture of the Finno-Ugric Peoples and Neighboring Peoples. International Symposium. P-sk, 1997.
