= Alexey Tigoyev =

Russian serial killer (born 1970)

- Born: Alexey Viktorovich Tigoyev; 1970 (age 55–56); Medvezhyegorsk, Karelian ASSR, RSFSR
- Other name: "The Medvezhyegorsk Maniac"
- Convictions: 1990: Murder; 2008: N/A (Acquitted by reason of insanity)
- Penalty: 1990: 11 years imprisonment 2008: Involuntary commitment

Details
- Victims: 7–9
- Span of crimes: 1990–2003
- Country: Soviet Union, Russia
- States: Karelia, Pskov
- Date apprehended: December 2003

Alexey Viktorovich Tigoyev (Russian: Алексей Викторович Тигоев; born 1970), known as The Medvezhyegorsk Maniac (Russian: Медвежьегорский маньяк), is a Soviet-Russian serial killer who committed between seven and nine murders in Karelia and Pskov from 1990 to 2003, out of a self-admitted impulse to hurt people whenever he saw an axe.

In 2004, he was acquitted by reason of insanity and ordered to undergo psychiatric treatment for an indefinite period of time.

== Early life and first murder ==
Alexey Tigoyev was born in 1970 in Medvezhyegorsk, in the Karelian ASSR. He grew up with both of his parents being alcoholics, leading to them being deprived of their parental rights in the late 1970s and the young Alexey being sent off to an orphanage in Kestenga. In 1988, the 18-year-old left the orphanage and moved to Pskov, Pskov Oblast, where he enrolled in a vocational school to study carpentry. After completing his education in 1990, he returned to Karelia and settled in the village of Tuksa, where he lived with a childhood friend.

A few weeks after his return, Tigoyev killed a friend of his father in a botched robbery. After his arrest for an unrelated theft, he confessed to the man's murder and showed investigators where he had buried the corpse in a plot of land owned by the state. This murder was committed with an axe, similar to Tigoyev's later murders.

For this crime, Tigoyev was convicted and sentenced to 11 years imprisonment, which he served out in full and was released in 2001. Upon his release, he moved in with his mother, who still lived in Medvezhyegorsk. Until September 2003, Tigoyev did not display any noticeable concerning behaviour or signs of a mental illness. In early September, a fire broke out in his mother's apartment, after which he was forced to look for a new place to live. Tigoyev eventually decided to leave the city and move to Olonets, where he would begin his murder spree.

== Murders ==
Tigoyev's first victim was an elderly resident of Olonets, Terentyev, who was repairing a car in his garage. On 20 September 2003, Tigoyev began a conversation with the man and drank together, after which they had an argument about the relationships between fathers and their sons. In the heat of the moment, Tigoyev grabbed an axe that was lying around in the garage and struck his new acquaintance several times on the head, inflicting a severe injury that would later lead to the man's death. Immediately after the murder, he fled the city and returned to Kestenga to lay low for some time, and in October, he travelled back to Medvezhyegorsk on foot.

On the way, he came across spouses Vasily and Elena Kuznetsova, residents of Murmansk who were returning home in their Moskvitch from a long trip when one of their wheels broke down along the 931st kilometre of the Saint Petersburg-Murmansk Highway. Tigoyev offered to help them out, which the couple gladly accepted. During the repairs, Tigoyev noticed an axe among the tools in the trunk of the car, which he grabbed and then used it to hack the Kuznetsovs to death. He then set the car on fire to destroy any evidence.

After these murders, Tigoyev returned to Medvezhyegorsk, but soon left Karelia altogether and moved to Pskov, where he took up a job as a carpenter at a local factory and was provided housing at a dormitory. On 2 November, after finishing his work for the day, Tigoyev got into an argument with a group of teenagers for being too noisy, leading to them telling him to shut up. Angered, Tigoyev used what he was carrying on him to attack them, killing a 13-year-old boy in the process. Immediately afterwards, he packed up his things and again returned to Karelia, where he resided with a couple he was acquainted with at their apartment.

On 1 December, only a few days into his stay with the couple, Tigoyev used an axe to hack them to death, inflicting several injuries to their heads.

== Investigation, arrest and confessions ==
In the subsequent investigation, the tenants of a neighbouring apartment stated that Tigoyev, whom they had seen visiting and speaking to the victims, might be involved in the killings. Based on their testimony, Tigoyev was brought in for questioning. Not long after his arrest, he confessed to investigators Denis Polyakov and Dmitry Zaikov that he was involved in other murders as well, describing details about the crimes that only the killer could have known.

In addition to this, he confessed to a double murder he committed in late October 2003. Tigoyev said that after killing the Kuznetsov couple, he went to Maselgskaya Station near Medvezhyegorsk, where he used to work part-time. In a village near the station, he asked to be taken in by two male acquaintances, who accepted his request. A few days later, relatives of a deceased villager came to them and asked them to dig a grave in exchange for money. Tigoyev claimed that he did not receive payment for his participation in the job, and so, after his two acquaintances returned from the wake, he attacked them in a drunken rage with an axe and bludgeoned them to death. After killing them, he locked the house and fled the village.

As no such crime had been reported to the police until then, Tigoyev was taken under escort to show the crime scene in mid-December 2003. While inspecting the house, officers located two half-decaying corpses in one of the rooms that they estimated had been there for approximately two months. Neighbours of the murdered men claimed that they had not paid much attention to their apparent absence, attributing it to their fishing hobby. The relatives of one of the murdered men lived in Medvezhyegorsk, but they also did not notify the police about the man's disappearance.

== Trial and treatment ==
Eventually, in March 2004, Tigoyev was charged with six of the murders, as prosecutors decided to drop the charges in the Kuznetsov case due to a lack of definitive evidence to link him to the crime. Shortly before he was due to stand trial, Tigoyev was sent off to the Serbsky Center to undergo a psychiatric examination at the request of his lawyers. On 21 December 2004, he was ruled incapable of standing trial and instead sent off to a psychiatric clinic after a decision by a panel of the Supreme Court of Karelia.

Since then, there has been no reliable information about Tigoyev's fate, and it is currently unclear whether he remains under treatment or if he is even still alive.

== See also ==
- List of Russian serial killers

== Books ==
- Antoine Casse and Irina Kapitanova (2023). The phenomenon of Russian maniacs. The first large-scale study of maniacs and serial killers from the times of tsarism, the USSR and the Russian Federation (Russian: Феномен российских маньяков. Первое масштабное исследование маньяков и серийных убийц времен царизма, СССР и РФ), Eksmo, ISBN 5046081180
