= 14 km dorogi Kem-Kalevala =

14 km dorogi Kem-Kalevala 14 км дороги Кемь-Калевала
- Settlement
- Location within Karelia Location within Russia
- Coordinates: 64.921111°N 34.361667°E
- Country: Russia
- Region: Republic of Karelia
- District: Kemsky District
- Time zone: UTC+03:00

14 km dorogi Kem-Kalevala (Russian: 14 км дороги Кемь-Калевала) is a rural locality (posyolok) in Kemskoye Urban Settlement of Kemsky District, Russia. The population was 604 as of 2013.

== Geography ==
It is located 13 km west of Kem, on the shore of the Putka reservoir.

== History ==
Previously, it was also known as the village of Sokol, where military pilots of the 265th fighter aviation regiment of the Air Defense lived, and earlier the 828th assault aviation regiment, who served at the Poduzhemye airfield, located near the highway.

== Transport ==
The federal highway R21 «Kola» passes through the village.

== Education and culture ==
The Poduzhemsky secondary school is located in the settlement.

== Historical monuments ==
A monument to the Su-15 aircraft is preserved in the village.

== Gallery ==
14 km dorogi Kem-Kalevala

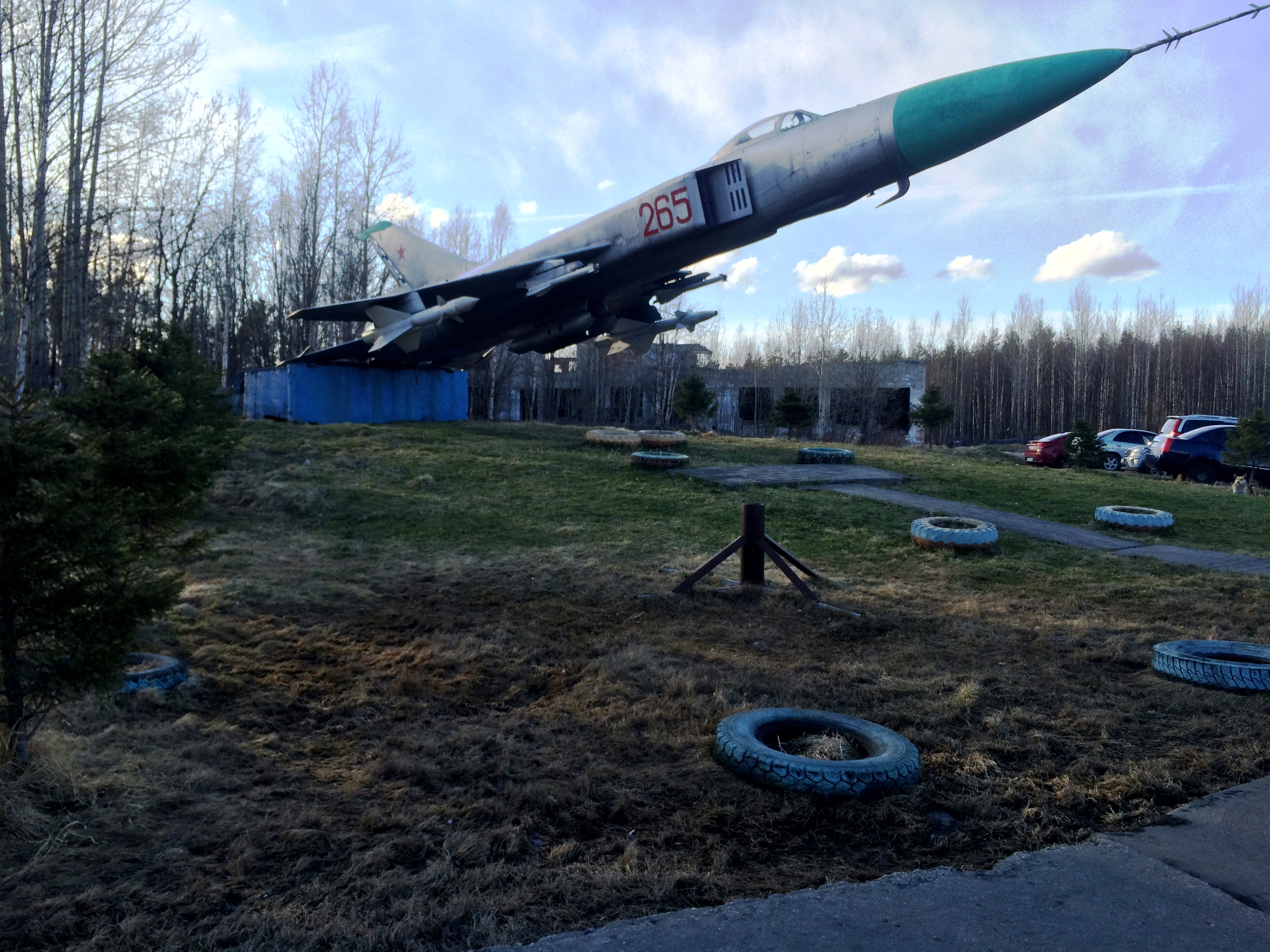
Monument.

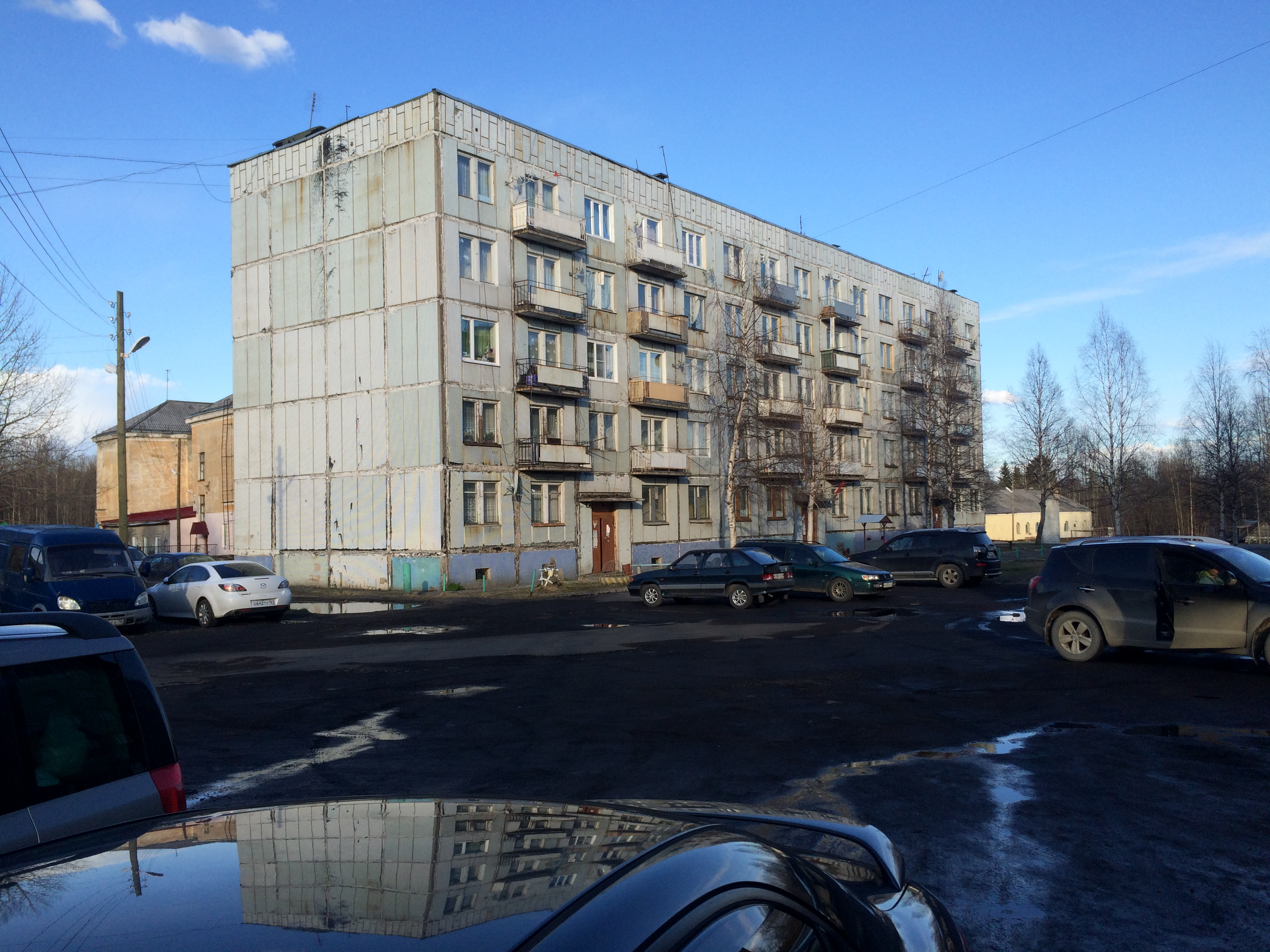
Residential buildings.

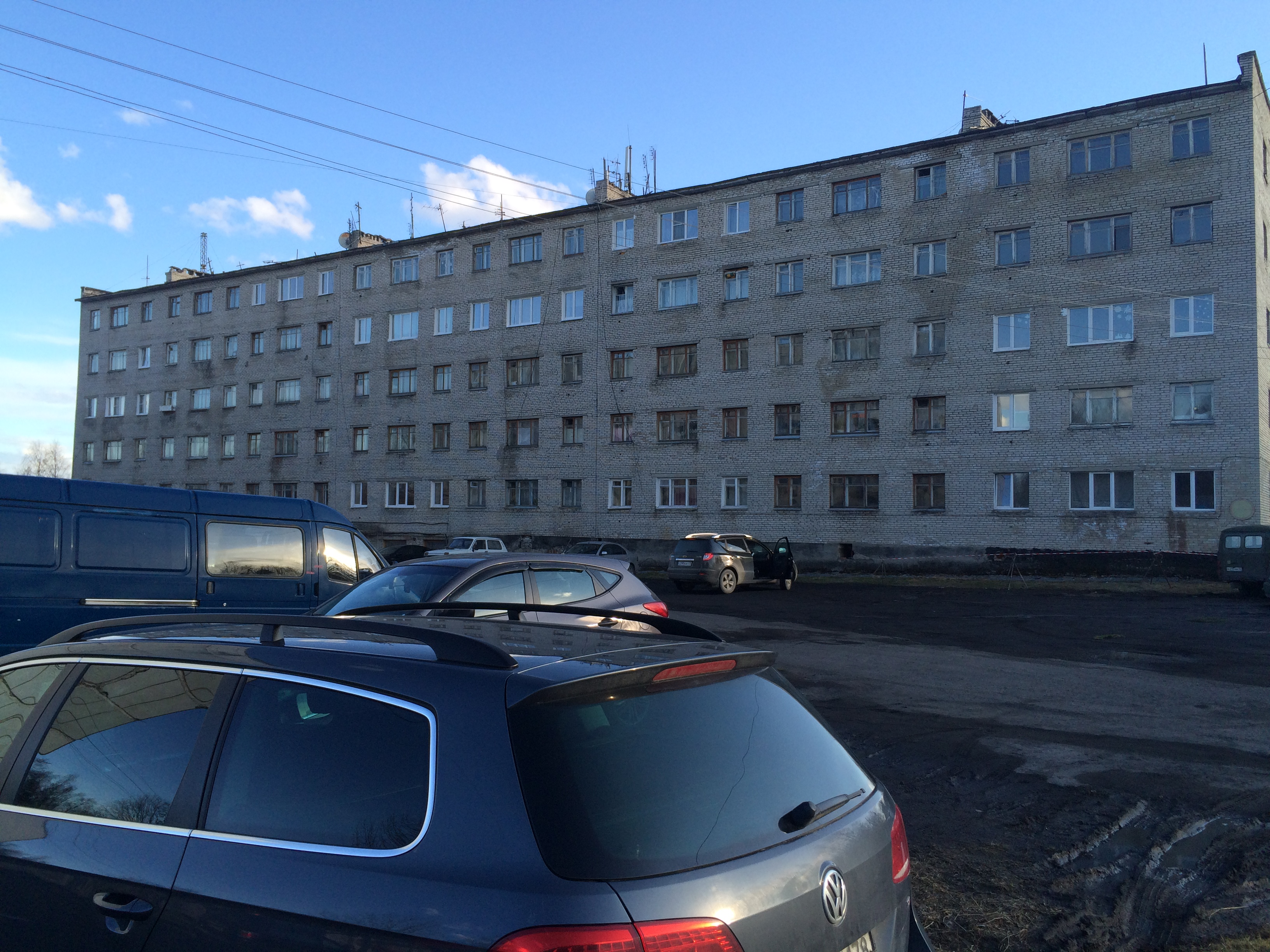
Residential building.
