= Ilyinsky, Republic of Karelia =

Ilyinsky Ильинский Alavoine (Karelian)
- Posyolok
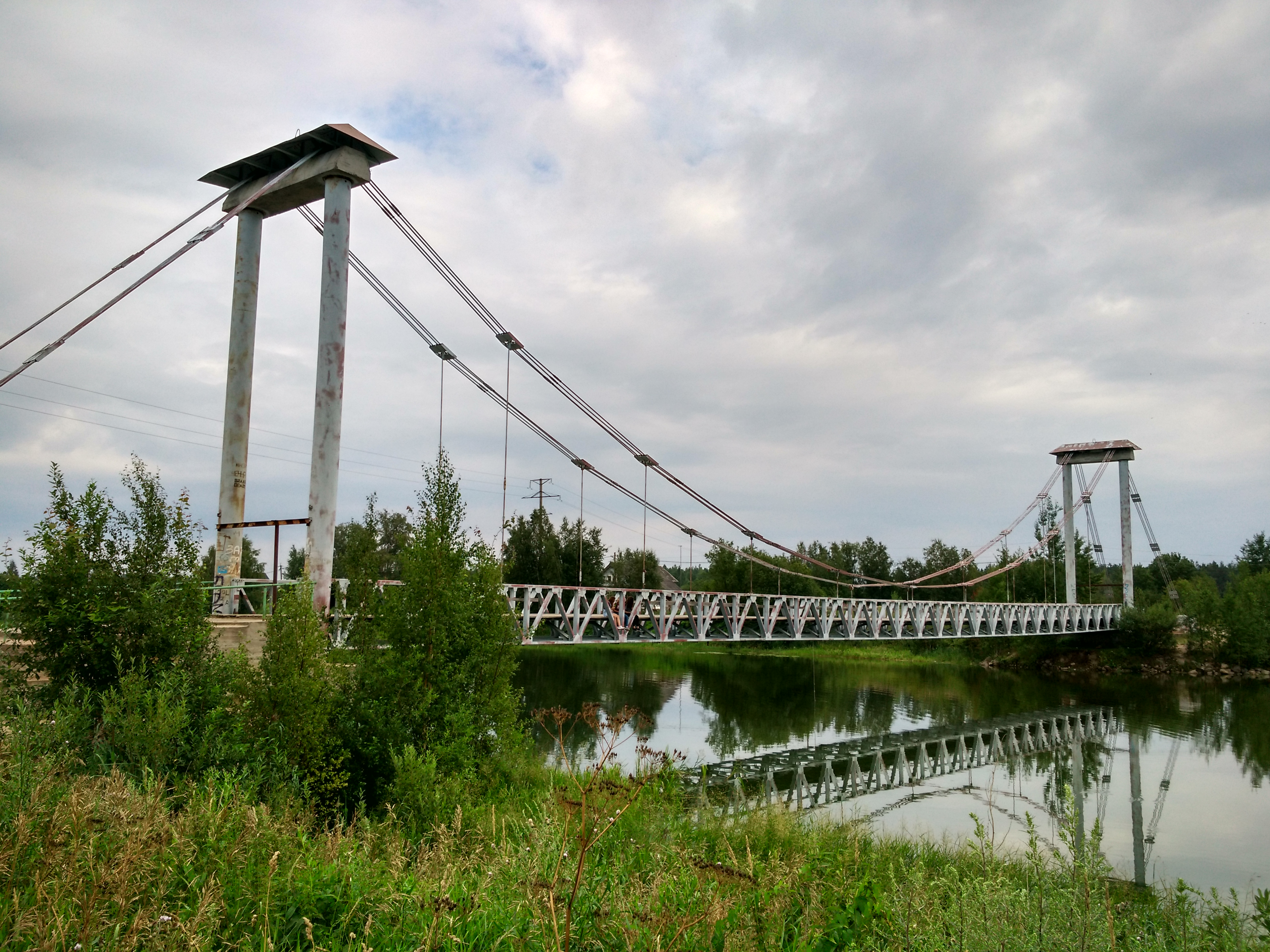
- Alavoine bridge
- Interactive map of Ilyinsky
- Location of Ilyinsky Ilyinsky (Karelia)
- Coordinates: 61°01′N 32°40′E
- Country: Russia
- Federal subject: Republic of Karelia
- Administrative district: Olonetsky District
- Founded: 17th century
- Posyolok status since: 1991

Population (2010 Census)
  - Total: 2,918
  - Estimate (2021): 2,057 (−29.5%)

Municipal status
  - Municipal district: Olonetsky Municipal District
  - Rural settlement: Ilyinskoye Rural Settlement
  - Capital of: Ilyinskoye Rural Settlement
- Time zone: UTC+3 (UTC+03:00)
- Postal code: 186004
- OKTMO ID: 86630415101

Ilyinsky (Russian: Ильинский, Livvi: Alavoine) is a village in the Olonetsky District of the Republic of Karelia, Russia, the administrative center of the Ilyinskoye rural settlement.

== Geography ==
Ilyinsky is located 19 km west of Olonets, on the Olonka River, four kilometers east of the coast of Lake Ladoga.

== History ==
The first known settlement on the territory of modern Ilyinsky was the village of Yuksila, mentioned in a land record of the Obonezhskaya Pyatina in 1651.

The modern settlement of Ilyinsky began developing after the establishment of a sawmill in 1927. In 1957, the villages of Goshkila, Kotchila, Margoyla, Rugoyla, Sloboda, Unoyla, Vinokurovo, Yuksila and Yakkoyla were consolidated with it. In 1962, the work settlement of Ilyinsky was formed, including the settlements of Antula, Ilyinskoye, Kuykka, Lesozavodsky, Nurmoyla, Stary Zavod, Ukrainka, Zivchala, and the Ilyinskaya railway station. Ilyinsky retained the status of an urban-type settlement until 1991.

== Economy ==
=== Industry ===
OJSC “Pedigree farm ”Ilinskoe” is working in the village. Breeding specialization is dairy farming. The farm is the undisputed leader in the production of milk in the Republic of Karelia.

=== Stores ===
In the village there are such large retail chains as Pyaterochka, Magnit. There is an issue point of the Ozon online store.

=== Financial services ===
A branch of the Russian commercial bank Sberbank is located in the village.

== Transport ==
=== Automobile communication ===
The highway 86K-8 Olonets-Pitkäranta-Leppyasylta passes through the village.

=== Railway ===
There is a railway station Ilyinskaya (line Yanisyarvi - Lodeynoye Pole) of the Volkhovstroevsky branch of the October Railway.

== Education and culture ==
In 1954, the Kotchilsky rural library was opened. Works Alavoine secondary school, children's music school. In 2006, the Alavoine Municipal Institution, the Center for Club Initiatives, was established.

== Demographics ==
Historical population
Year	Pop.	±%
1970	3,320	—
1979	3,141	−5.4%
1989	3,334	+6.1%
2002	3,204	−3.9%
2010	2,918	−8.9%
Source: Census data

=== Population ===
2,918 (2010 census); 3,204 (2002 census); 3,334 (1989 Soviet census).

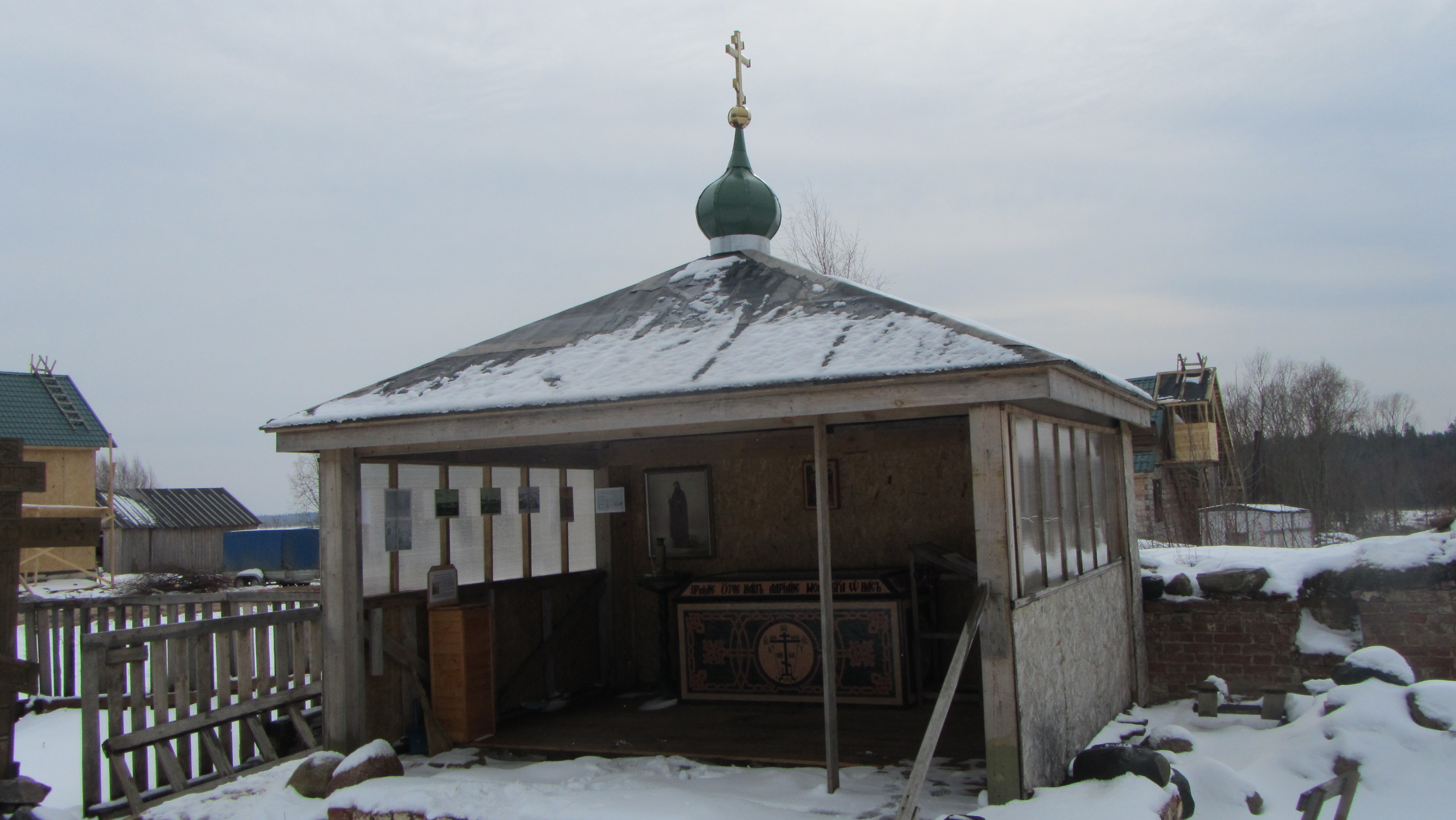

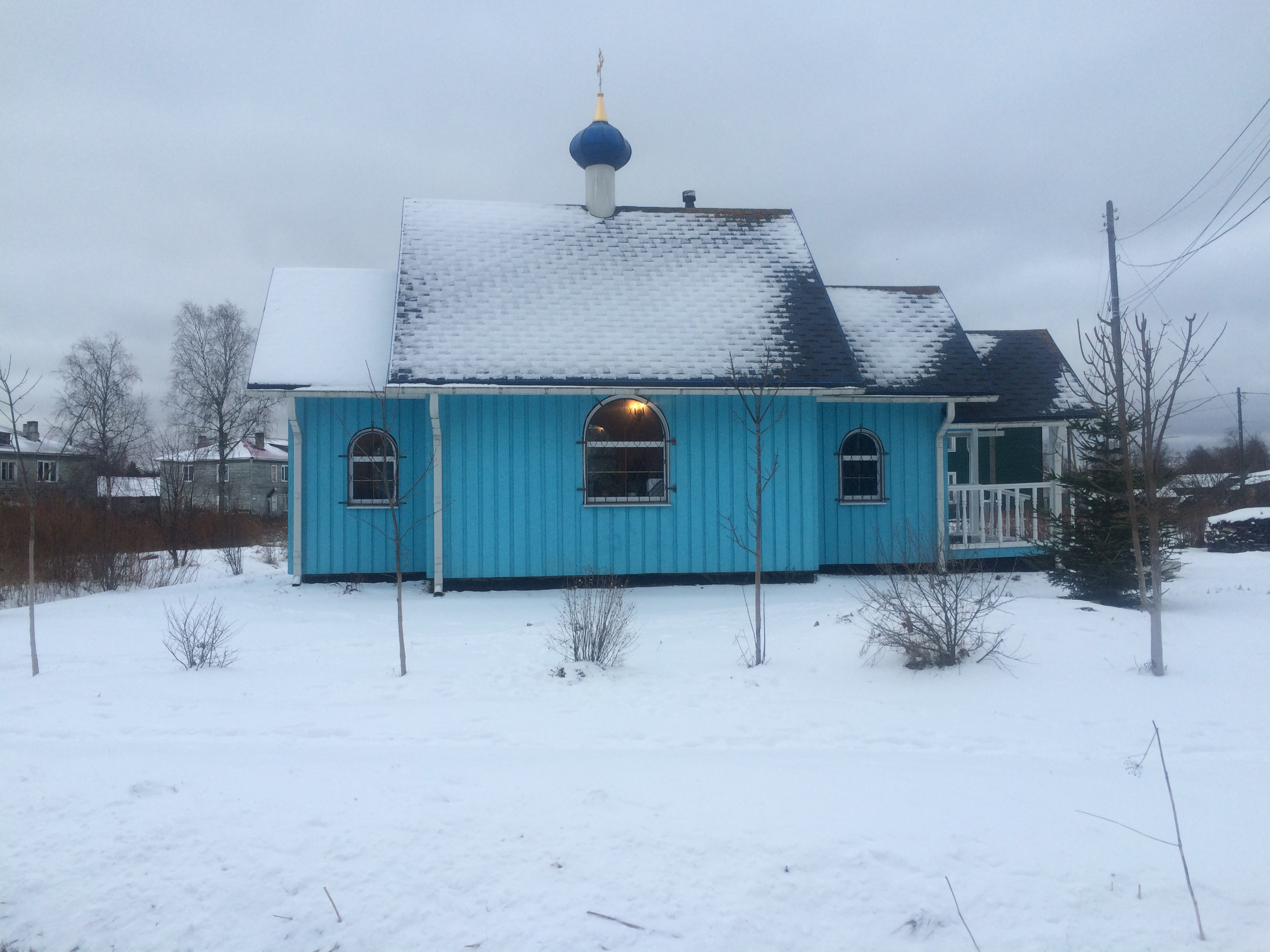

== Historical monuments ==
Historical monuments are preserved in the village:

- St. Nicholas Adriano-Andrusovsky Monastery
- Mass grave of soviet soldiers who died during the Continuation War (1941-1944)
- The grave of the Hero of the Soviet Union, the Red Navy man A. I. Moshkin
- Grave of the Hero of the Soviet Union, Lieutenant Colonel V. N. Leselidze

== Natural monuments ==
2 km northwest of the village there is a state regional swamp monument of nature — a swamp near the Olonka River with an area of 42.0 hectares, a typical swamp complex of the eastern coast of Lake Ladoga.

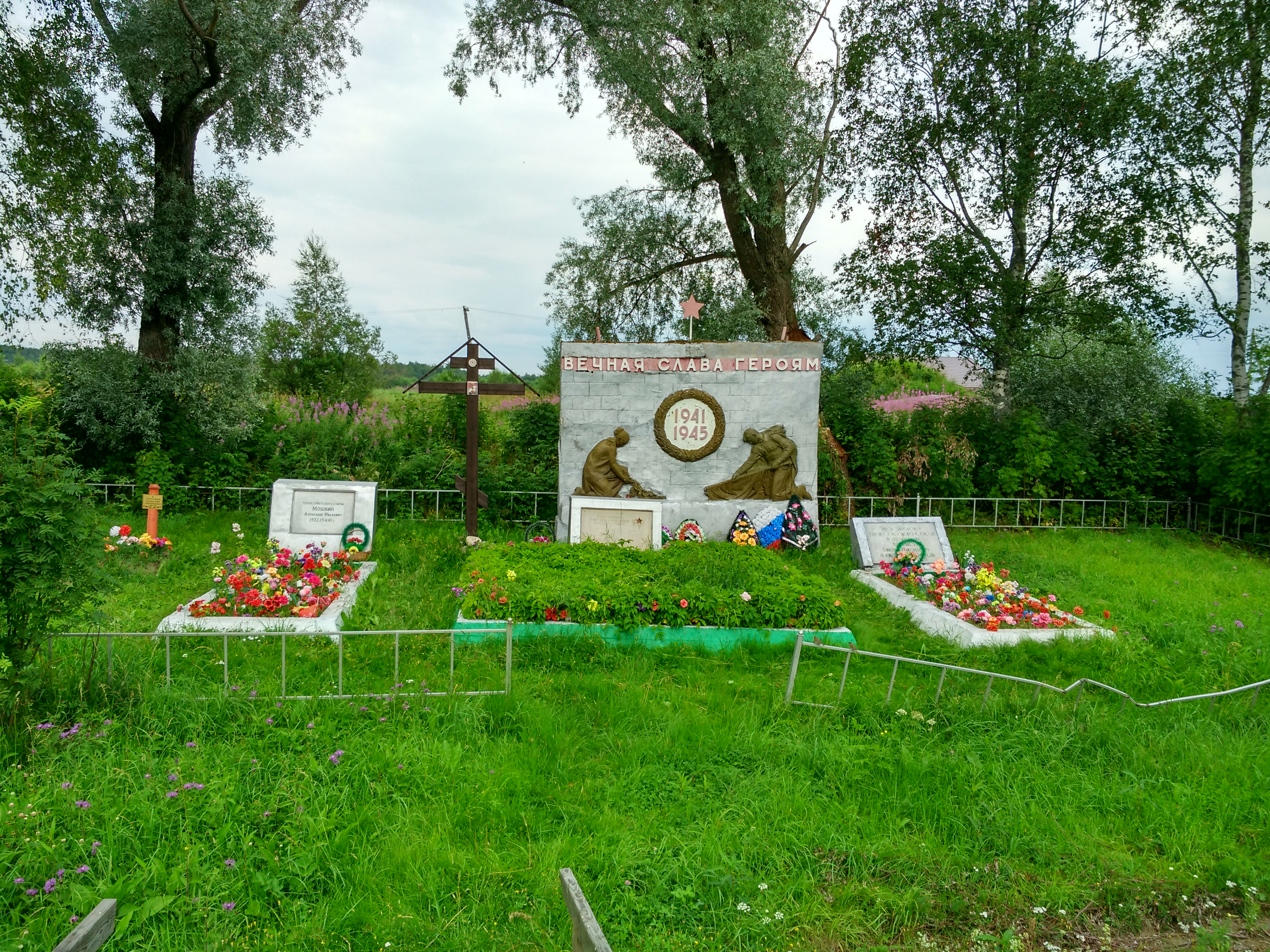

In the vicinity of the village in the fields there is the largest parking lot of migratory birds in Northern Europe and the state landscape reserve "Andrusovo" — a specially protected natural area.
