= Nyukhcha =

Set index of articles associated with the same name

Nyukhcha (Russian: Нюхча) is the name of several rural localities in Russia:

- Nyukhcha, Arkhangelsk Oblast, a village in Nyukhchensky Selsoviet of Pinezhsky District of Arkhangelsk Oblast
- Nyukhcha, Republic of Karelia, a selo in Belomorsky District of the Republic of Karelia
