= Tuksa =

Rural locality in Olonetsky District, Karelia, Russia

Coordinates: 61.006278°N 32.846333°E

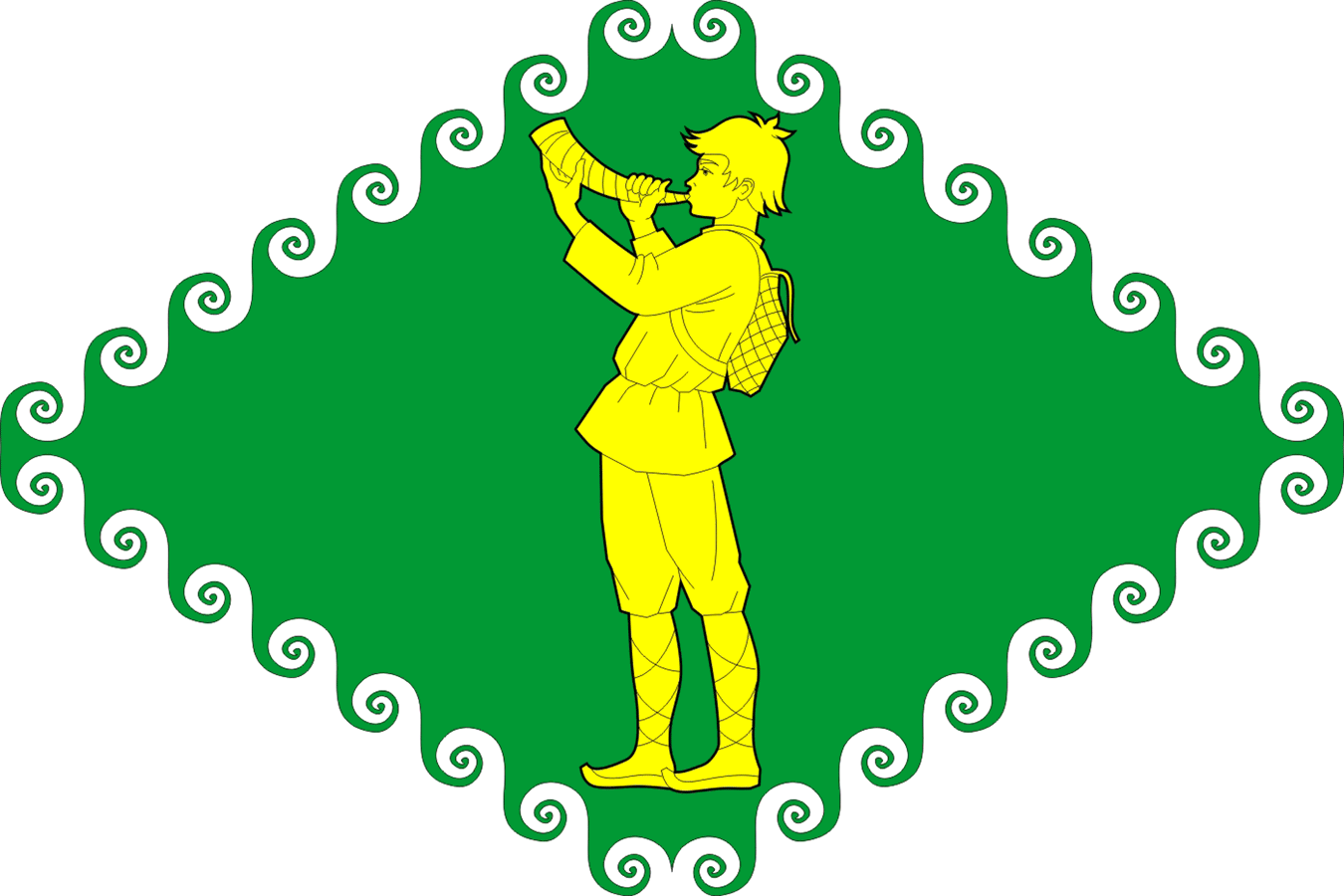
Flag of Tuksinskoye rural settlement

Tuksa (Russian: Тукса, Livvi: Tuuksi) is a village and the administrative center (and the sole populated place) of Tuksinskoye rural settlement, Olonetsky District, Republic of Karelia, Russia. It is located 8 km to the west of Olonets and stretches about 7 km north–south along the Tuksa until it flows into Olonka, where it meets with the Central Street of the Immalitsy village, stretched along the northern bank of Olonka.
