= Olonetsky =

Olonetsky (masculine), Olonetskaya (feminine), or Olonetskoye (neuter) may refer to:

- Olonetsky District, a district of the Republic of Karelia, Russia
- Olonetskoye Urban Settlement, a municipal formation incorporating the town of Olonets and eight rural localities in Olonetsky District of the Republic of Karelia, Russia
- Olonets Governorate (Olonetskaya guberniya), a governorate of the Russian Empire
- Olonets Viceroyalty (Olonetskoye namestnichestvo), a viceroyalty of the Russian Empire bordering Vologda Viceroyalty
- Olonets Oblast (Olonetskaya oblast), a division of the Russian Empire, originally in Novgorod Viceroyalty
