= 6 km dorogi Kem-Kalevala =

6 km dorogi Kem-Kalevala 6 км дороги Кемь-Калевала
- Settlement
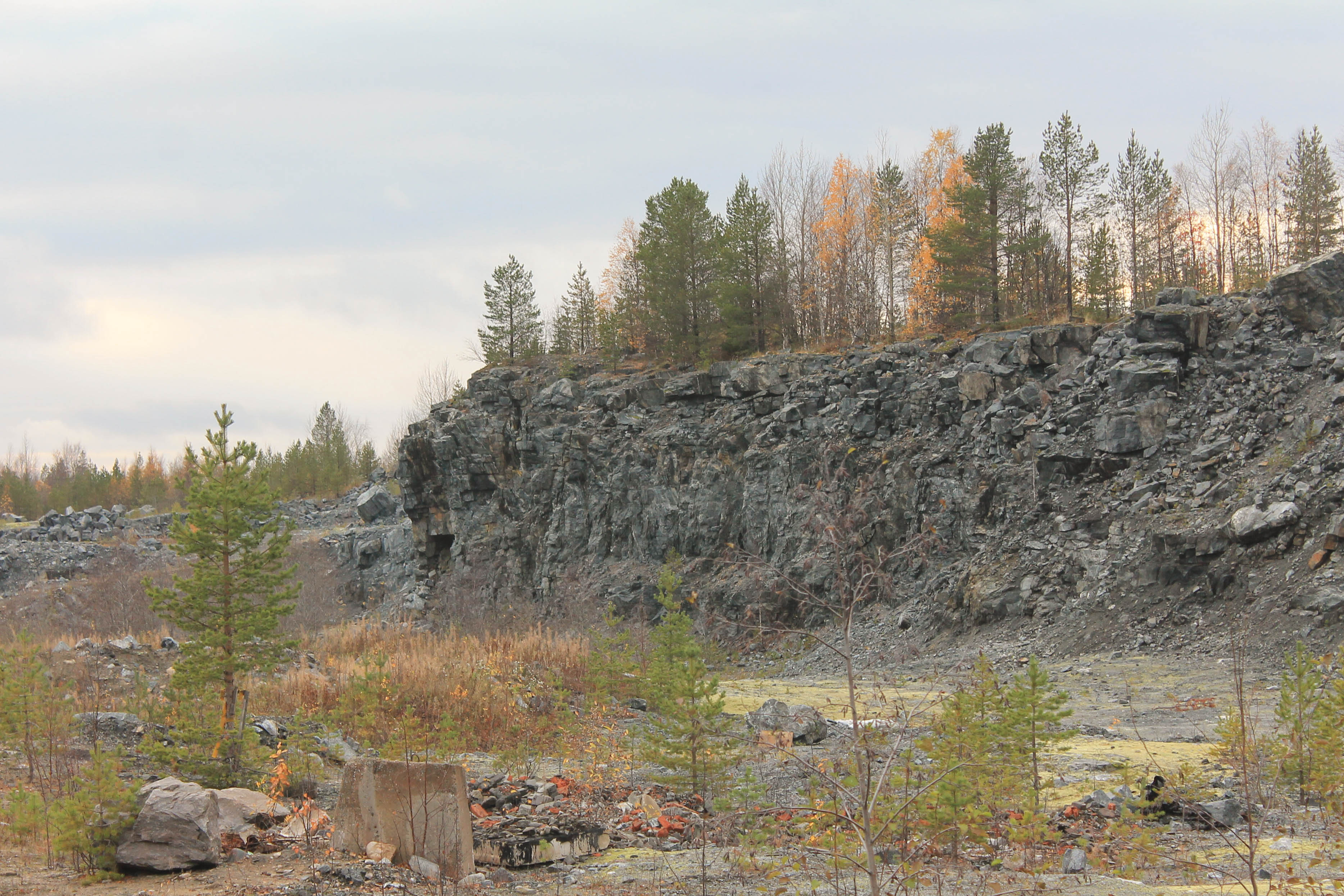

- Location within Karelia Location within Russia
- Coordinates: 64.941389°N 34.490833°E
- Country: Russia
- Region: Republic of Karelia
- District: Kemsky District
- Time zone: UTC+03:00
- Postal code: 186605

6 km dorogi Kem-Kalevala (Russian: 6 км дороги Кемь-Калевала) is a rural locality (a settlement) in Kemskoye Urban Settlement of Kemsky District, Russia. The population was 4 as of 2013.

== Geography ==
The settlement is located 6 km west of Kem (the district's administrative centre) by road. Kem is the nearest rural locality.

== Streets ==
There are no streets with titles.
