= Suoyarvsky =

Suoyarvsky (masculine), Suoyarvskaya (feminine), or Suoyarvskoye (neuter) may refer to:

- Suoyarvsky District, a district of the Republic of Karelia, Russia
- Suoyarvskoye Urban Settlement, a municipal formation which the town of Suoyarvi in Suoyarvsky District of the Republic of Karelia is incorporated as
