= Puoroyoya =

Location
- Country: Russia

Physical characteristics
- Mouth: Tuloksa
  - coordinates: 61°17′42″N 32°45′33″E
- Length: 19 km (12 mi)
- Basin size: 134 km^{2} (52 sq mi)

Basin features
- Progression: Tuloksa→ Lake Ladoga→ Neva→ Gulf of Finland

Puoroyoya (Russian: Пуоройоя) is a river in Russia, flowing around Olonetsky District of Karelia. The mouth of the river is 47 km on the left bank of the river Tuloksa. The river is 19 km, the catchment area 134 км².
