= Tuksa (disambiguation) =

Tuksa is a village in Karelia, Russia.

Tuksa may also refer to:

- Tuksa River, Karelia, Russia
- Spelling of the name Tukša without diacritics:
  - Veljko Tukša Yugoslavian association football player
  - Goran Ivčić "Tukša" – bass guitar of Serbian rock band Obojeni Program
  - Tukša, fictional character in 1995 Croatian film Washed Out
