= Immalitsy =

Coordinates: 60.980229°N 32.885113°E

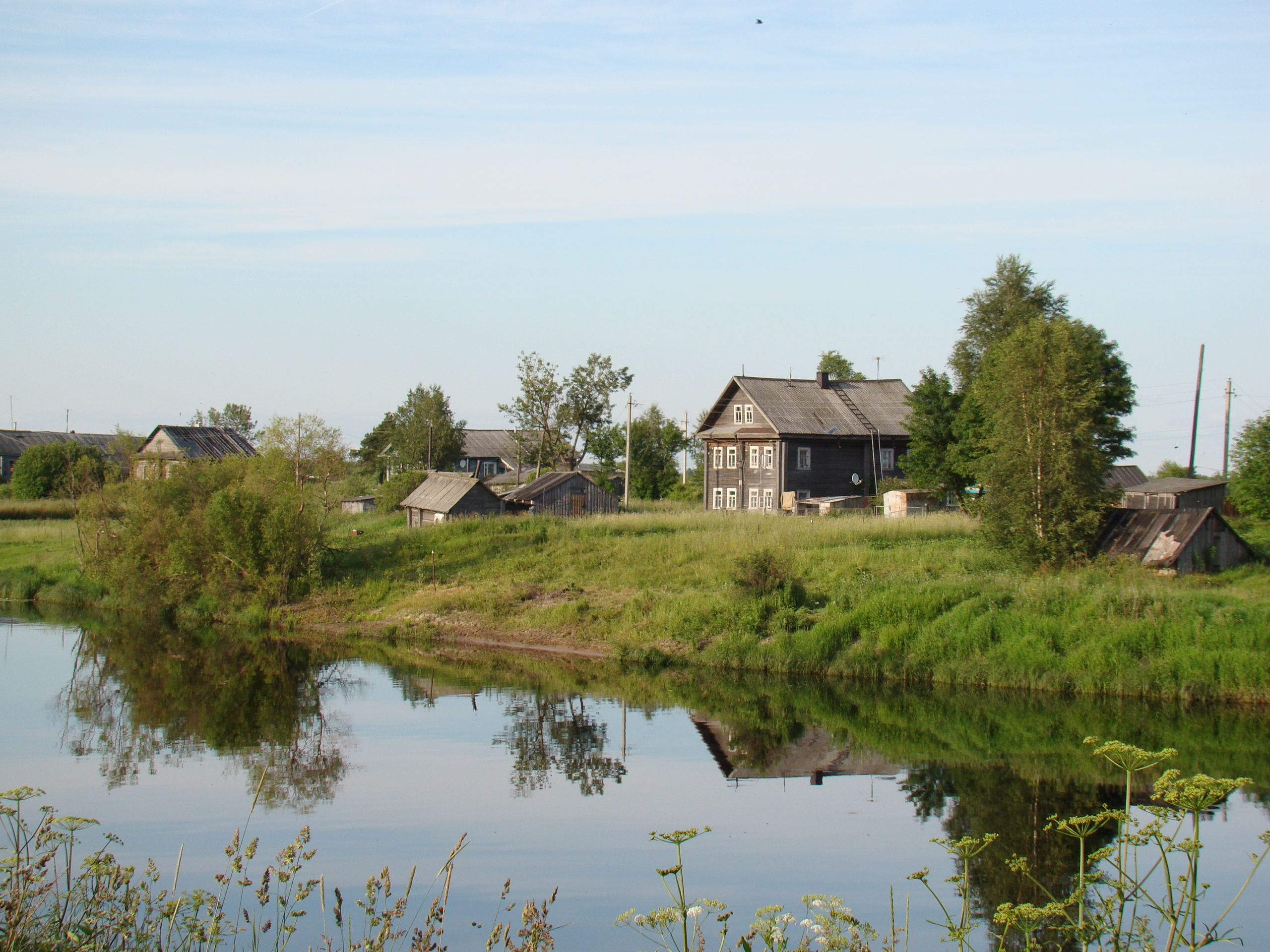
Immalitsy

Immalitsy (Livvi: Immal, Russian: Иммалицы) is a village within the municipality of Olonetskoye urban settlement, Olonets District, Republic of Karelia, Russia. On January 1, 2013, it had population of 154. It is located by the bank of river Olonka.

As a result of population decline, the villages of Verkhnyaya Yeroyla, Issoyla, Malaya Immalitsa, Bolshaya Immalitsa, Peski and Petchilya were merged into a single settlement in 1957.
