= Livvi-Karelian language =

Karelian dialect spoken in Russia and Finland

Livvi-Karelian
- Ливви liygi livvin kieli
- Native to: Russia, Finland
- Region: between Lake Ladoga and Lake Onega, northward of Svir River, Karelia
- Ethnicity: Olonets Karelians
- Native speakers: (14,100–25,000 cited 2000–2010)
- Language family: Uralic: Finnic; Northern Finnic; Karelian; Livvi-Karelian
- Writing system: Latin (Karelian alphabet)

Official status
- Recognised minority language in: Finland; Russia: Republic of Karelia

Language codes
- ISO 639-3: olo
- Glottolog: livv1243
- ELP: Livvi
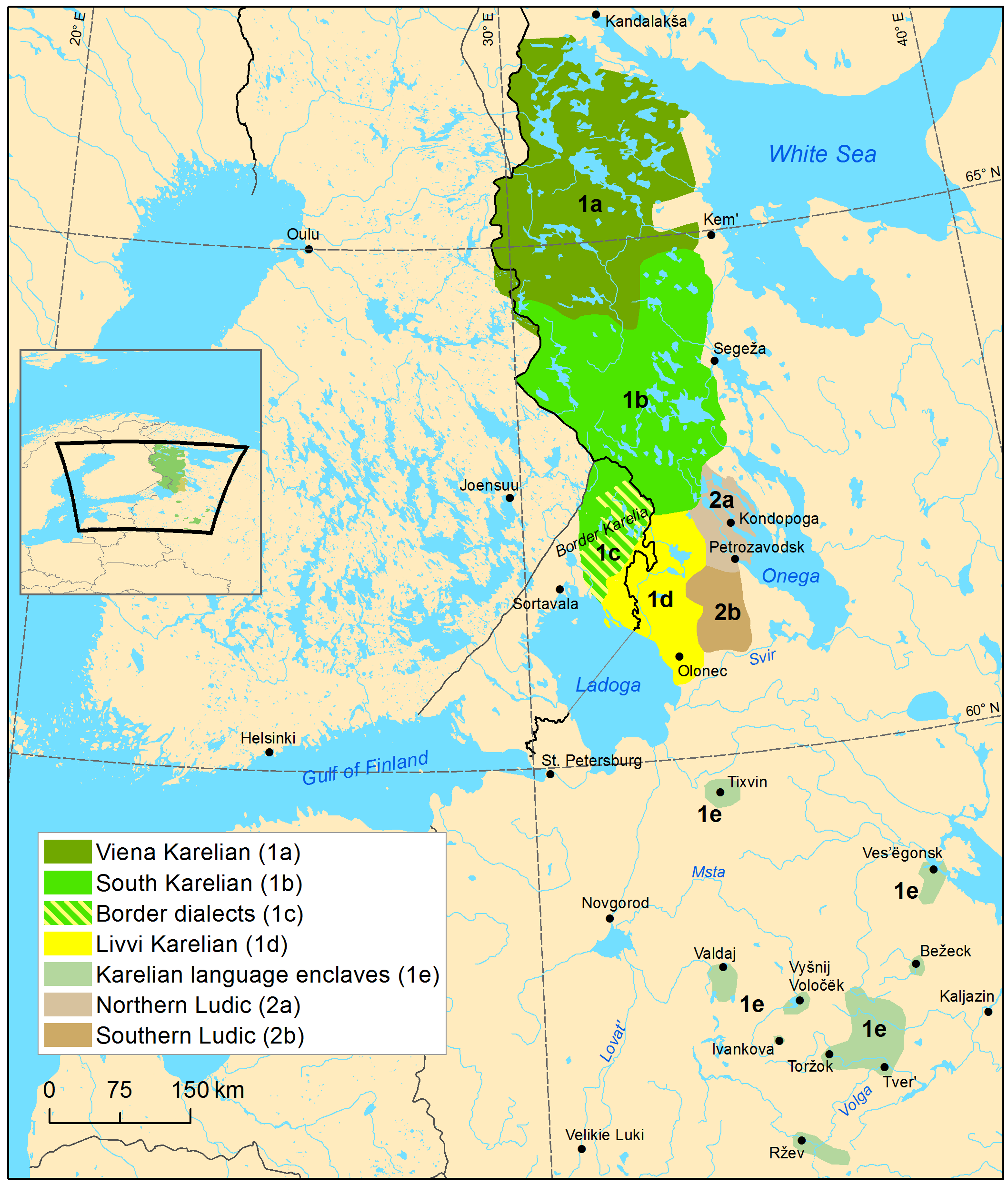
- Distribution of Karelian and Ludic at the beginning of the 20th century

- Olonetsian is classified as Definitely Endangered by the UNESCO Atlas of the World's Languages in Danger (2010)

- People: Karelians
- Language: Karelian; Livvi-Karelian
- Country: Karelia

Livvi-Karelian (Alternate names: Liygi, Livvi, Livvikovian, Olonets, Southern Olonetsian, Karelian; Russian: ливвиковское наречие, romanized: livvikovskoye narechiye) is a supradialect of Karelian, which is a Finnic language of the Uralic family, spoken by Olonets Karelians (self-appellation livvi, livgilaizet), traditionally inhabiting the area between Ladoga and Onega lakes, northward of Svir River.

Tatiana Boiko speaks about the Livvi-Karelian dialect of the Karelian language and the VepKar corpus, with subtitles in English. KarRC RAS, 2018.

The name "Olonets Karelians" is derived from the territory inhabited, Olonets Krai, named after the town of Olonets, named after the Olonka River.

== History ==
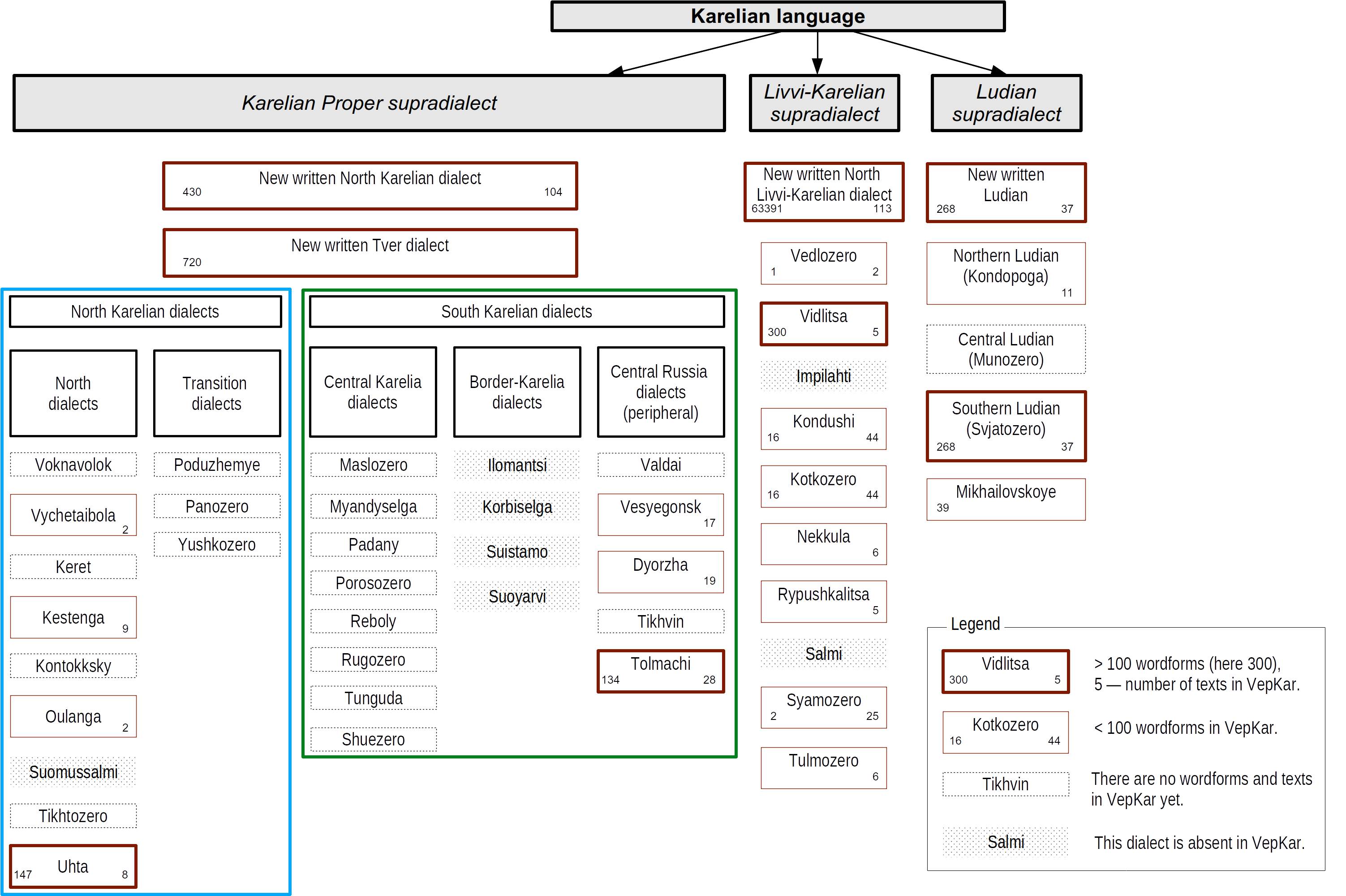
Dialects of the Karelian language includes Karelian Proper supradialect, Livvi-Karelian supradialect, Ludic supradialect.

Before World War II, Livvi-Karelian was spoken both in Russia and in Finland, in the easternmost part of Finnish Karelia. After Finland was forced to cede large parts of Karelia to the USSR after the war, the Finnish Livvi-Karelian population was resettled in Finland. Today there are still native speakers of Livvi-Karelian living scattered throughout Finland, but all areas in which Livvi-Karelian remains a community language are found in Russia.

Speakers of Livvi-Karelian may be found mainly in Olonetsky, Pryazhinsky, Pitkyarantsky, and partly Suoyarvsky districts of the Republic of Karelia. Livvi-Karelian long remained relatively uninfluenced by the Russian language despite the large influx of Russians following the founding of Saint Petersburg in 1703.

== Phonology ==
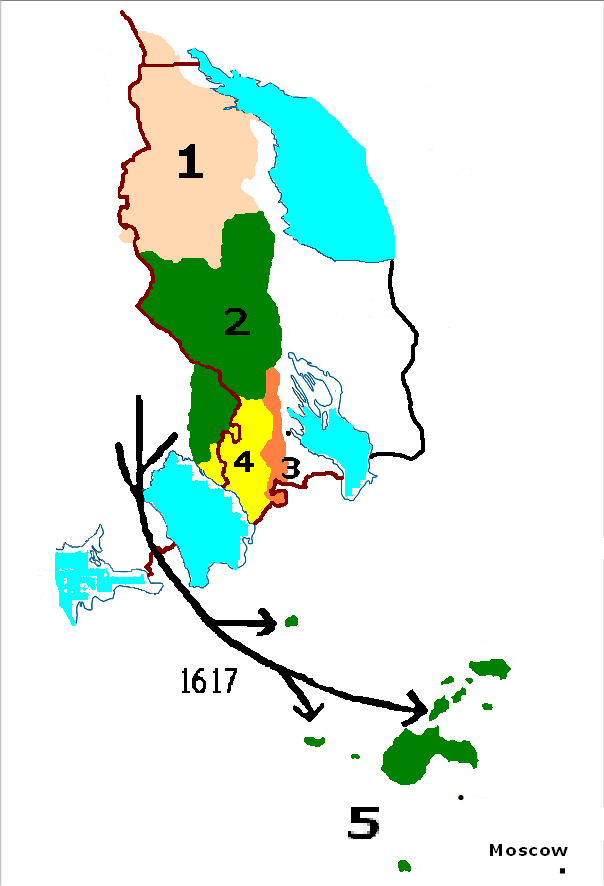
Karelian dialects mapped out, with Number 4 being the Livvi-Karelian dialect.

=== Vowels ===
| | Front | | Back | |
| | rnd. | urnd. | rnd. | urnd. |
|---|---|---|---|---|
| Close | i iː | y yː | | u uː |
| Mid | e | ø | | o |
| Open | æ | | ɑ | |

=== Consonants ===
| | | Labial | Alveolar | | Palatal | Velar | Glottal |
| | | Labial | plain | pal. | Palatal | Velar | Glottal |
|---|---|---|---|---|---|---|---|
| Plosive | voiceless | p | t | tʲ | | k | |
| Plosive | voiced | b | d | dʲ | | ɡ | |
| Affricate | voiceless | | t͡s | | t͡ʃ | | |
| Affricate | voiced | | | | d͡ʒ | | |
| Fricative | voiceless | (f) | s | | ʃ | (x) | h |
| Fricative | voiced | | z | | ʒ | | |
| Nasal | | m | n | | | (ŋ) | |
| Approximant | | ʋ | l | | j | | |
| Rhotic | | | r | | | | |

- Consonants may also occur as geminated or long [Cː].
- Sounds /f, x/ are commonly heard from Russian loanwords.
- /h/ can have allophones of [x] or [χ].
- /n/ is heard as [ŋ] when preceding /k/ or /ɡ/.
- Palatalization [ʲ] may occur among different dialects when consonants are preceding vowels /i, y/.

== Alphabet ==
Livvi-Karelian uses the Latin alphabet and has the following letters in its alphabet, which is called the Karelian alphabet: Aa, Bb, Cc, Čč, Dd, Ee, Ff, Gg, Hh, Ii, Jj, Kk, Ll, Mm, Nn, Oo, Pp, Rr, Ss, Šš, Zz, Žž, Tt, Uu, Vv, Yy, Ää, Öö.

Until 2007, the ü letter was a part of the Livvi-Karelian alphabet, which has been recommended by the Karelian language board to be instead be changed to the y letter.

== Grammar ==
Livvi-Karelian and its grammatical cases are quite similar to the Finnish language and other related Finnic languages.

The word 'food' in Livvi-Karelian cases:

| case | singular | plural |
|---|---|---|
| nom. | syömine | syömizet |
| gen. | syömizen | syömizien |
| par. | syömisty | syömizii |
| ine. | syömizes | syömizis |
| ill. | syömizeh | syömizih |
| ela. | syömizes | syömizis |
| ade. | syömizel | syömizil |
| abe. | syömizettäh | syömizittäh |
| all. | syömizele | syömizile |
| abl. | syömizel | syömizil |
| ess. | syömizenny | syömizinny |
| tra. | syömizekse | syömizikse |
| com. | syömizen | syömizienke |
| prol. | syömizeči | syömiziči |
| term. | syömizessäh | syömizissäh |
| approx. | syömizellyö | syömiziellyö |
| acc. | syömine | syömizet |

== Common phrases ==
Hello! - Terveh!

How are you? - Kuibo dielot?

Good night! - Hyviä yödy!

Good afternoon! - Hyviä päiviä!

Do you speak Karelian? - Pagizetgo (sinä) karjalakse?

I'm sorry. - Minul on žiäli.

You're welcome. - Ole hyvä.

I love you. - Suvaičen sinuu.

Goodbye. - Jiä tervehekse.

My name is ... - Minun nimi on ...

Excuse me. - Prostikkua.

Help! - Avvutakkua!

Cheers! - Teijän tervehyökse!

Right. - Oigei.

Left. - Hurai.

Yes. - Da.

No.. - Ei.

One. - Yksi.

Two. - Kaksi.

Three. - Kolme.

Four. - Nelli.

Five. - Viizi.

== See also ==
- Olonets
- Birch bark letter no. 292
