= Poduzhemye (air base) =

Former Air base in Karelia, Russia

Poduzhemye
- Kem, Karelia in Russia
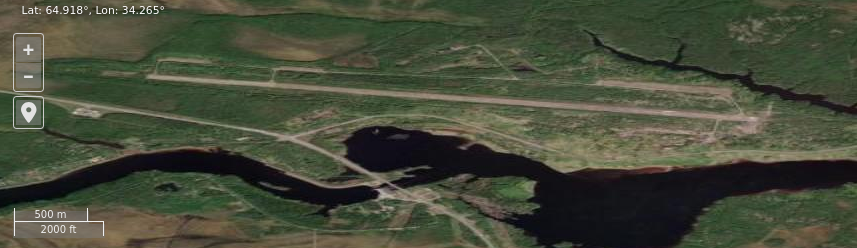
- Satellite imagery of former Poduzhemye air base

Site information
- Type: Air Base
- Owner: Ministry of Defence
- Operator: Russian Air Force

Location
- Shown within Karelia Poduzhemye (Russia)
- Coordinates: 64°55′6″N 34°15′54″E

Site history
- Built: 1944
- In use: 1944 - 1994

Airfield information
- Identifiers: ICAO: XLPU
- Elevation: 48 metres (157 ft) AMSL
Runways
Direction	Length and surface
09/27	2,500 metres (8,202 ft) Concrete

Poduzhemye (also Kem/Uzhmana or Uzhmana) is a former air base in Karelia, Russia located 16 km west of Kem.

The 265th Fighter Aviation Regiment arrived at the base from Riga-Rumbula in Latvia in 1953, when it was flying Mikoyan-Gurevich MiG-15s (NATO: Fagot). It transitioned to Mikoyan-Gurevich MiG-17s (NATO: Fresco) in 1954 and Sukhoi Su-15 (NATO: Flagon) in 1969. It was subordinated to the 113th Fighter Aviation Division from 13.6.55 - 1960, the 5th Air Defence Division, 1961 - 4.80, the Air Forces of the Leningrad Military District, 4.80 - 3.86, and then the 23rd Air Defence Division, 3.86 - 1994. It also flew Sukhoi Su-27 (NATO: Flanker) aircraft. The regiment was disbanded in 1994.

Aircraft from this base forced down Korean Air Flight 902, a Boeing 707, in 1978. Google high-res imagery shows that the base is abandoned and is in neglected condition. There is a noteworthy 45 x 25 m hangar north of the airfield.

== History of the airfield ==
The airfield during the war was used in the interests of the troops of the Karelian Front. In March 1944 and at the aerodrome were based parts of the operational group 8th long-range air corps: operational group 36th Long-Range Aviation Division and 109th Long-Range Aviation Regiment on Ilyushin Il-4.

The concrete runway of the airfield was built in 1953 on the basis of the plan for the formation of a new air defense system of the USSR to accommodate air defense fighter units. From October 1953, 265th Fighter Aviation Regiment, 336th Fighter Aviation Division moved to the airfield from the Rumbula airfield MiG-15. In 1954, the regiment was reequipped on aircraft MiG-17.

Since May 1955, after the fulfillment of a government assignment in China, 348th Fighter Aviation Regiment was redeployed to the airfield with support units. In 1956, a separate reconnaissance aviation squadron on MiG-17 aircraft was redeployed from under Chita. In 1965, the regiment was reequipped for new modifications of the MiG-17PF, equipped with radar sights. In 1969, the regiment was the first in 10th Air Defense OA began to retrain to a supersonic fighter Sukhoi Su-15 (NATO: ), which flew before its disbandment in 1994.

In the period from September 1, 1953 and to July 1, 1960, the headquarters of the 336th Fighter Aviation Division was located at the airfield.

== See also ==
- List of military airbases in Russia
