= Kaalamo =

Rural settlement in Karelia, Russia

Kaalamo Кааламо Kaalamo (Finnish)
- Posyolok
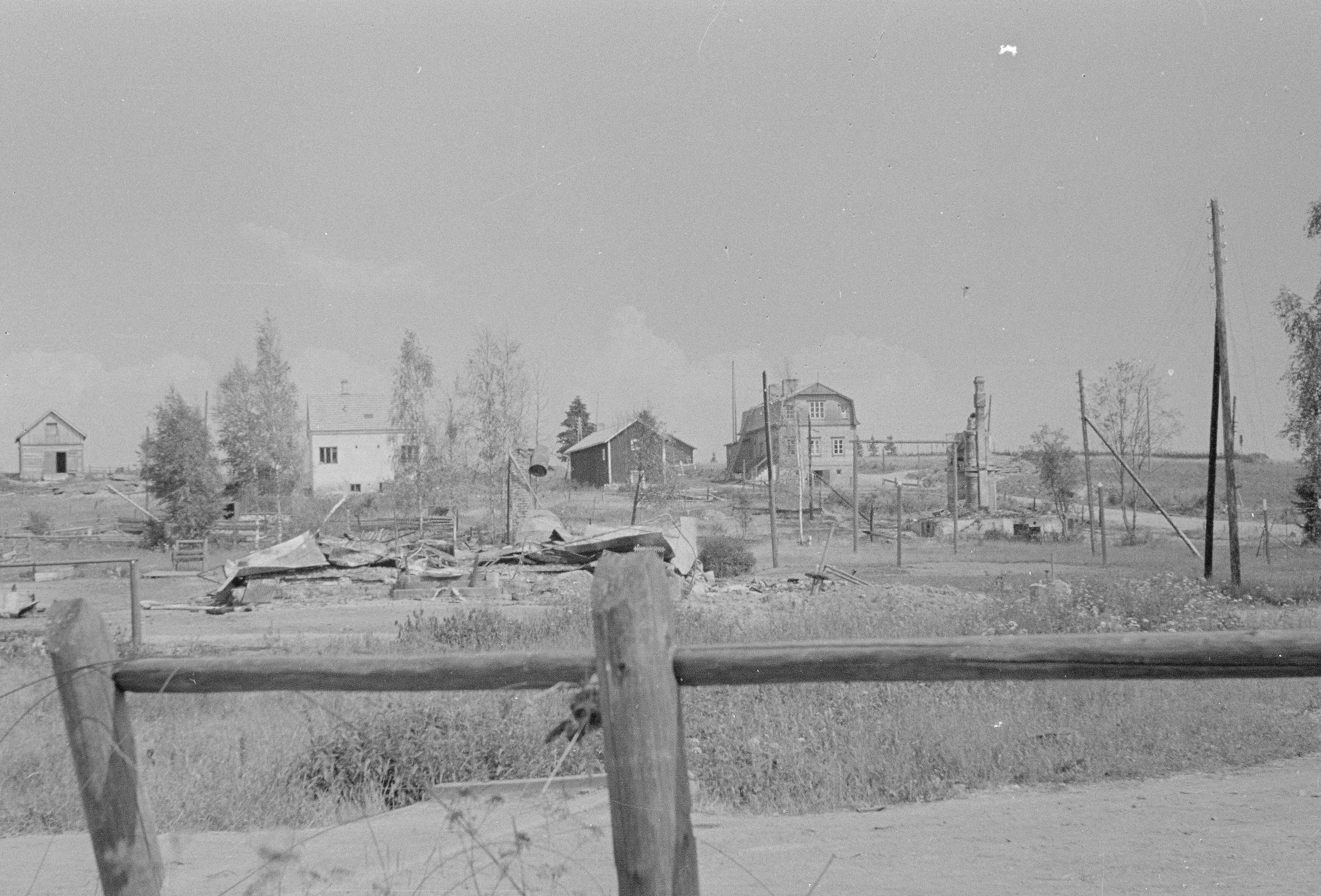
- Yleiskuva ryssien polttamasta Kaalamosta. Nkym rautatielt itn.
- Interactive map of Kaalamo
- Location of Kaalamo Kaalamo (Karelia)
- Coordinates: 61°54′13″N 30°31′13″E
- Country: Russia
- Federal subject: Republic of Karelia
- Administrative district: Sortavalsky District

Population (2010 Census)
  - Total: 1,286
  - Estimate (2021): 933 (−27.4%)

Municipal status
  - Municipal district: Sortavalsky Municipal District
  - Rural settlement: Kaalamskoye Rural Settlement
  - Capital of: Kaalamskoye Rural Settlement
- Time zone: UTC+3 (UTC+03:00)
- Postal code: 186762
- OKTMO ID: 86610411101

Kaalamo (Russian: Каала́мо) is a rural locality in the Republic of Karelia, Russia. The settlement is located 35 kilometers north of Sortavala along the railway between Sortavala and Suojärvi. Its population is 1,300 (in 2008). Before the Winter War and Continuation War, it used to be part of Finland.
