= Velikaya Guba =

Velikaya Guba Великая Губа Suurlahti (Karelian)
- Selo
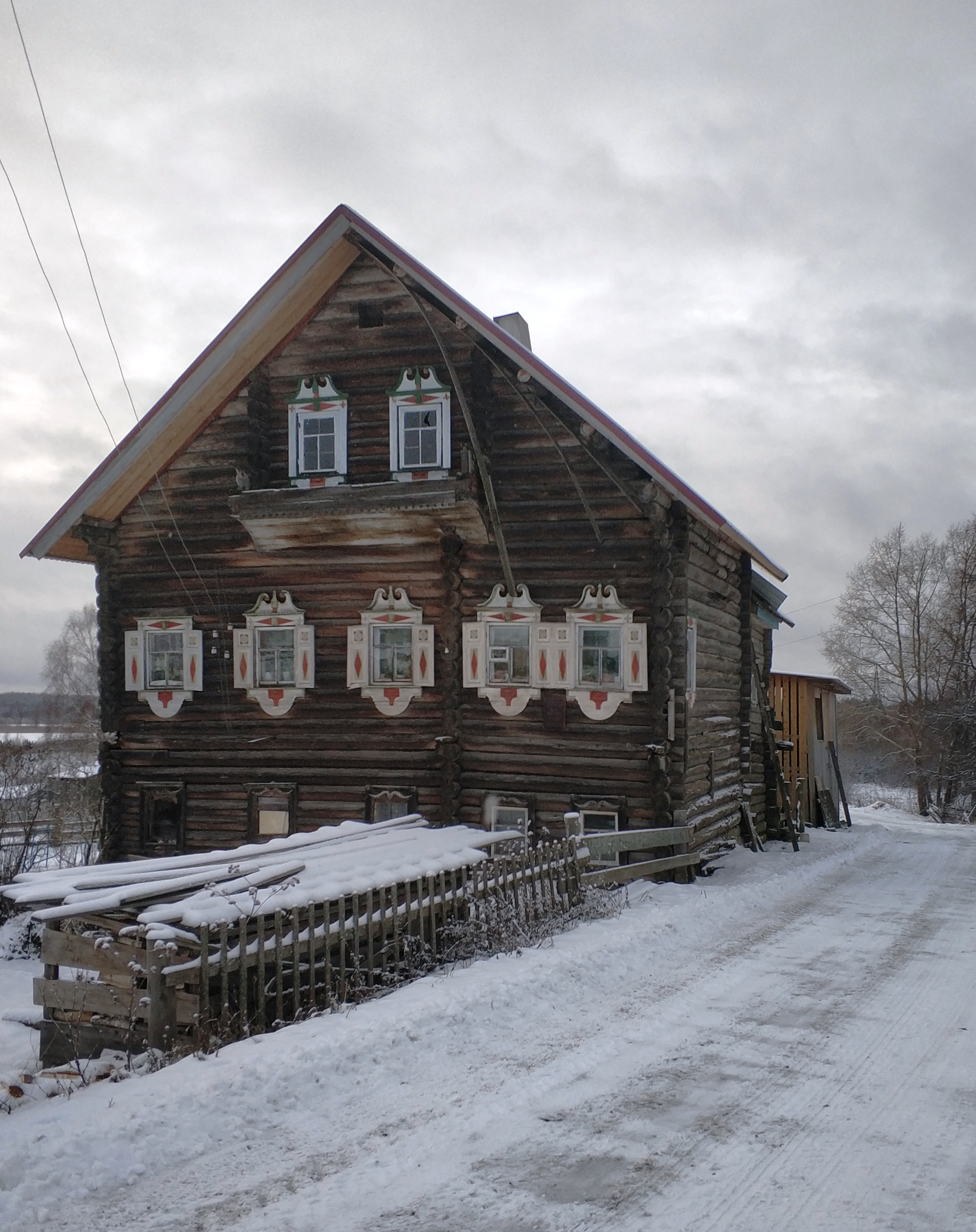
- Residential building in Velikaya Guba village
- Interactive map of Velikaya Guba
- Location of Velikaya Guba Velikaya Guba (Karelia)
- Coordinates: 62°15′0″N 35°4′29″E
- Country: Russia
- Federal subject: Republic of Karelia
- Administrative district: Medvezhyegorsky District

Population (2010 Census)
  - Total: 1,098
  - Estimate (2021): 969 (−11.7%)

Municipal status
  - Municipal district: Medvezhyegorsky Municipal District
  - Rural settlement: Velikogubskoye Rural Settlement
  - Capital of: Velikogubskoye Rural Settlement
- Time zone: UTC+3 (UTC+03:00)
- Postal code: 186314
- OKTMO ID: 86624405101

Velikaya Guba (Russian: Вели́кая Губа́; Karelian and Finnish: Suurlahti; not to be confused with an identically named locality on Lake Segozero) is a village (selo) in the Medvezhyegorsky District, part of the Republic of Karelia, in turn a subject of the Russian Federation. It is located on Lake Onega, on the eastern bank of the Great Bay (hence the name), about 110 km south of Medvezhyegorsk and some 80 east of Petrozavodsk. From here a very sparsely populated area comprising 2,895 square kilometers is administered. The entire territory has some 2,500 inhabitants (rough data from the late 2010s).

== History ==
The area was lightly peopled by the ancestors of the Sami people, Veps and Karelians, before Russian speakers from the south began colonizing it from the 13th century onwards, creating monasteries and diffusing Orthodox Christianity among the local pagan tribes. Velikaya Guba's name first appeared in written documents in the year 1583. In 1877 it was made the chief center of a volost in Petrozavodsky Uyezd, in turn part of the Olonets Governorate. In 1905, said volost counted some 10,000 inhabitants in all. A busy trading town in the Zaonezhye area, Velikaya Guba also had a tourist port with steamboats. After many administrative changes during the first Soviet decades and the Continuation War, from September 7, 1944 to March 11, 1959 Velikaya Guba headed the Zaonezhsky District of the Karelo-Finnish Soviet Socialist Republic.

== Population ==
Numbers from the chief town proper went down from 1,364 in 2009 to 1,098 in 2010 to 1,035 in 2013. According to the Russian census held in 2010, 93% of the local inhabitants self-identify as Russians, and 2% each as Karelians, Ukrainians, and Belarusians.

== Transportation and economy ==
Velikaya Guba is linked to Medvezhyegorsk by a surfaced road (P17). A bus service links the town to Medvehyegorsk and Petrozavodsk. A ferry boat travels to Velikaya Guba, Kizhi Island, Sennaja Guba and Petrozavodsk. Kizhi Island and Sennaja Guba are linked in winter by a helicopter service to Peski airport near Petrozavodsk.

The town hosts small sawmills and salmon aquaculture farms. Local facilities include a kindergarten, a secondary school, a cultural centre, a library, a small clinic, post office, a bank, a pharmacy and a few shops. There is also a small neuropsychiatric hospital.

== Tourism ==
The Zaonezhye area (also known as Äänisniemi in Finnish) is a destination for tourism due to its attractive taiga and lake nature and the historical remains of the Orthodox faith and architecture. Kizhi Island, 1 hour and 40 minutes by ferry away, is renowned for its pogost (originally a pilgrim's and traveller's hostel and trade center) and the related wooden building complex, a UNESCO World Heritage Site. Other sights of national interest are the wooden churches of lakes Yandozero and Kosmozero, built in 1656 and 1769 respectively, and the 17th- and 18th-century chapels at Korba, Seletskaya, Ust-Yandoma, Vasilyev, and Volkostrov (Wolf Island). At Velikaya Guba, itself endowed with the status of historical settlement, a main sight is the Church of St. Alexy, Man of God, built in 1866. A guesthouse exists for tourists.
