= Nyukhcha, Arkhangelsk Oblast =

Nyukhcha Нюхча
- Village
- Location within Arkhangelsk Oblast Location within Russia
- Coordinates: 63°26′N 46°31′E
- Country: Russia
- Region: Arkhangelsk Oblast
- District: Pinezhsky District
- Time zone: UTC+3:00

Nyukhcha (Russian: Нюхча) is a rural locality (a village) in Nyukhchenskoye Rural Settlement of Pinezhsky District, Arkhangelsk Oblast, Russia. The population was 163 as of 2010. There are 4 streets.

== Geography ==
Nyukhcha is located on the Nyukhcha River, 150 km southeast of Karpogory (the district's administrative centre) by road. Zanyukhcha is the nearest rural locality.
