= Panozero =

Panozero Панозеро Puanajärvi (Karelian)
- Settlement
- Interactive map of Panozero
- Location of Panozero Panozero (Karelia)
- Coordinates: 64°58′20″N 32°50′00″E
- Country: Russia
- Federal subject: Republic of Karelia
- Administrative district: Kemsky District
- Time zone: UTC+3 (UTC+03:00)
- Postal code: 186609
- OKTMO ID: 86612437121

Panozero (Russian: Панозеро; Karelian: Puanajärvi) is a rural locality (a settlement) in Kemsky District of the Republic of Karelia, located along the Kem River. Nowadays Panozero belongs to the Krivoy Porog municipality. Panozero is also called Old Panozero to make a difference to the new settlement of Panozero which is located 1.5 kilometers further away. The population of the village was approximately 100 in the year 2000.

Panozero has preserved its old Karelian village outlook and is regarded as an important and endangered representative of the old style villages of Karelia. The plans to build the Valkiala hydroelectric power plant would destroy the village under a huge water reservoir. The proposed hydroelectric plant would not inundate New Panozero, but the settlement would become an island. Panozero is one of the most valuable old style villages in Karelia and the only one remaining along the Kem river.

In the year 1996 Panozero was selected to the World Monuments Watch (WMW) list of 100 most endangered sites. Panozero village was also on the list from 1998-1999 and 2000-2001, after which the threat was considered to have passed. Due to its endangered status the village has received restoration funds from the Samuel Henry Kress foundation.

== History ==
The village of Panozero was inhabited in prehistoric times. In 1886 J.W. Juvelius brought some Stone Age objects found in the village to the collections in the Finnish National Museum in Helsinki.

According to some historical sources the coast of the White Sea was occupied by Karelians as early as the ninth century A. D. Before that time the area was inhabited by Sami.

According to tradition, Panozero was the oldest village in eastern Karelia and its inhabitants spread from there to Yushkozero and Soposalma villages. Panozero was also the site of the first Christian church built in Viena district, and it was the administrative center of East Viena for centuries.

In 1879, Panozero had 64 houses. In 1905, according to the official census, it had 73 houses and 427 inhabitants. At that time, the Panozero district included eight other villages, yielding a total population of 1,029 people.

When the Uzhma Rapids, the largest on the Kem River, were harnessed and the village of Poduzhemye inundated, Panozero became the only remaining Karelian village along the river.
