= Unitsa =

Village in Republic of Karelia, Russia

Unitsa Уница Uničču (Karelian)
- Hamlet
- Interactive map of Unitsa
- Location of Unitsa Unitsa (Karelia)
- Coordinates: 62°35′49″N 34°27′43″E
- Country: Russia
- Federal subject: Republic of Karelia
- Administrative district: Kondopozhsky District

Population (2010 Census)
  - Total: 164
  - Estimate (2021): 124 (−24.4%)

Municipal status
  - Municipal district: Kondopozhsky Municipal District
  - Rural settlement: Kappeselgskoye Rural Settlement
- Time zone: UTC+3 (UTC+03:00)
- Postal code: 186252
- OKTMO ID: 86615420121

Unitsa (Russian: У́ница; Karelian: Uničču) is a village in Republic of Karelia, Russia, on a bank of Unitskaya Gulf of Lake Onega. The same name also belongs to a nearby railway station.
