= Naistenjärvi =

Naistenjärvi Найстенъярви
- City
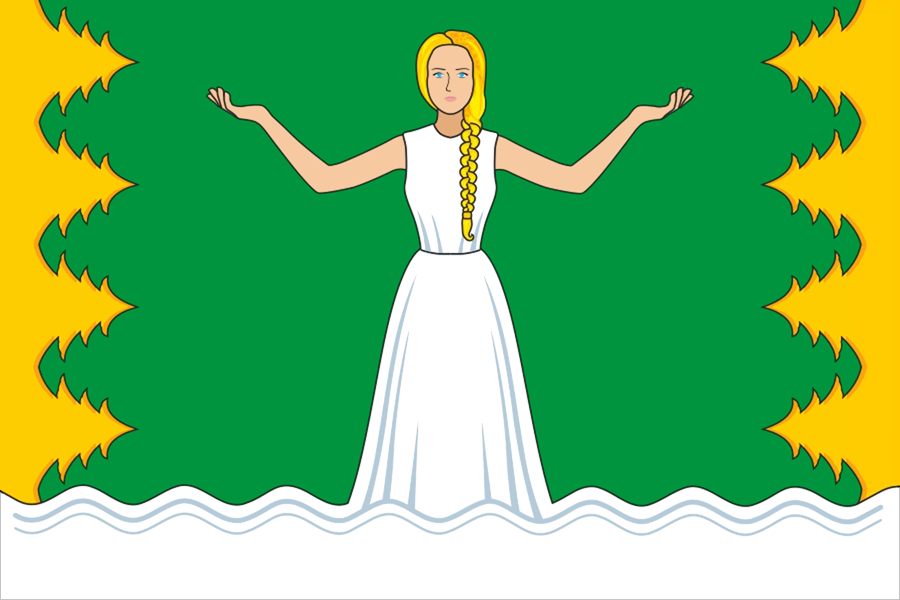
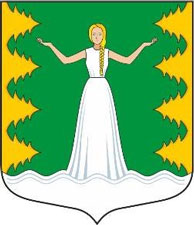
- Flag Coat of arms
- Interactive map of Naistenjärvi
- Location of Naistenjärvi Naistenjärvi (Karelia)
- Coordinates: 62°16′N 32°41′E
- Country: Russia
- Federal subject: Republic of Karelia

Population
  - Estimate (2021): 1,906 )
- Time zone: UTC+3 (UTC+03:00)
- Postal code: 186882
- OKTMO ID: 86650437

Naistenjärvi (Russian alphabet Найстенъярви, from Karelian, Veps and Finnish meaning women's lake) is a rural municipality in Suoyarvsky District, in the Republic of Karelia, Russia.
