= Nyukhcha, Republic of Karelia =

Nyukcha Нюхча
- Selo
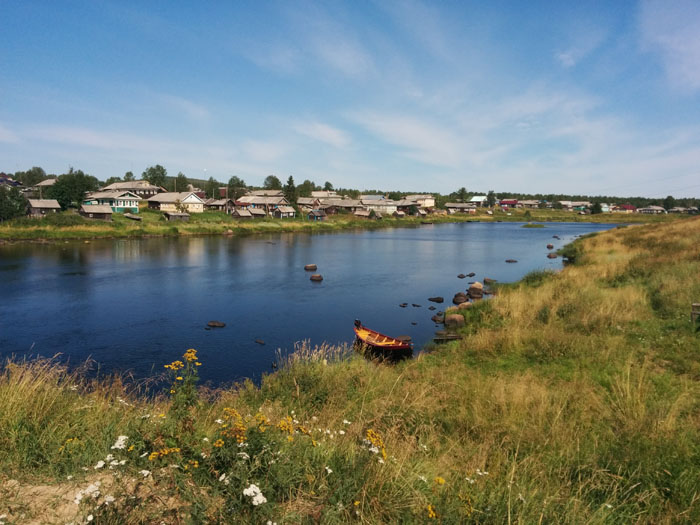
- Nyukhcha
- Interactive map of Nyukcha
- Location of Nyukcha Nyukcha (Karelia)
- Coordinates: 63°55′28″N 36°15′18″E
- Country: Russia
- Federal subject: Republic of Karelia
- Administrative district: Belomorsky District

Population (2010 Census)
  - Total: 339
  - Estimate (2021): 211 (−37.8%)

Municipal status
  - Municipal district: Belomorsky Municipal District
  - Rural settlement: Sumposadskoye Rural Settlement
- Time zone: UTC+3 (UTC+03:00)
- Postal code: 186580
- OKTMO ID: 86604433138

Nyukhcha (Russian: Ню́хча; meaning swan in Sami) is a rural locality (a selo) in Belomorsky District of the Republic of Karelia, Russia, located on the Nyukhcha River near the border between the Republic of Karelia and Arkhangelsk Oblast, 10 kilometers (6.2 mi) from the White Sea.

== History ==
In the XV century, the village of Nyukhcha belonged to the wife of the Novgorod posadnik Isaac Boretsky, Marfa Boretskaya. In the XV—XVI centuries, after the fall of Novgorod and annexation to Moscow, the village was assigned to a monastery on the Solovetsky Islands. In 1702, the overland «Osudareva Road» was built, starting from the Nyukhcha pier.

On August 27, 1940, by the decree of the Karelian Central Executive Committee, the church in Nyukhcha was closed.

Until March 21, 2013 — the administrative center of the Nyukhchinskoye rural settlement.

On March 21, 2013, the Nyukhchinskoye rural settlement was abolished, the village became part of the Sumposadskoye rural settlement.

== Attractions ==
- The main attraction of the village is the Osudareva Road located a few kilometers away, along which in 1702, by order of Peter I, 2 warships were dragged from the White Sea to Lake Onega due to the absence of a fleet on the Baltic Sea.
