= Kem, Russia =

Kem Кемь Kemi (Karelian)
- Town
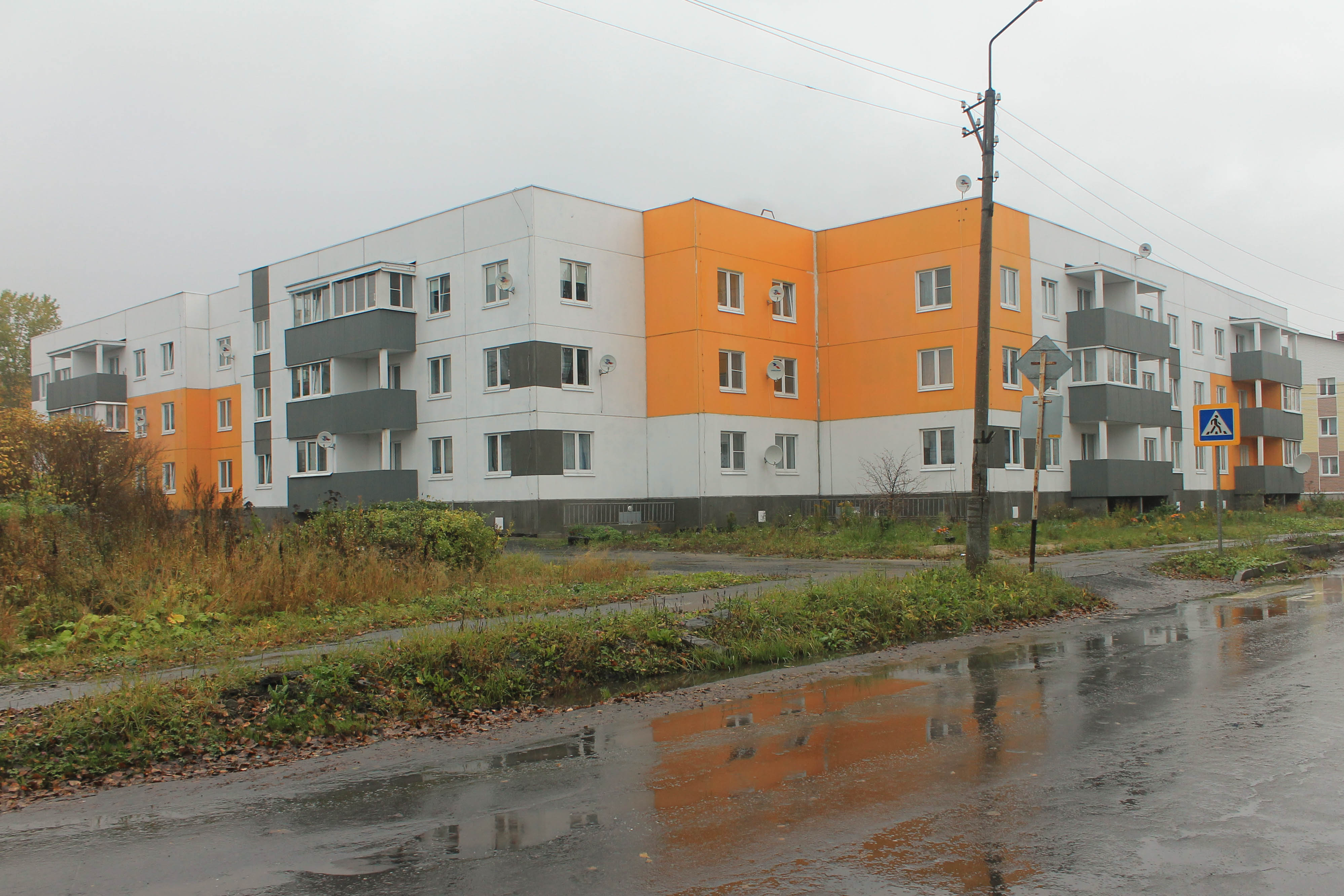
- Lenina street, 23a, Kem, Karelia, Russia

- Flag Coat of arms
- Interactive map of Kem
- Location of Kem Kem (Karelia)
- Coordinates: 64°57′N 34°35′E
- Country: Russia
- Federal subject: Republic of Karelia
- Administrative district: Kemsky District
- First mentioned: 1450
- Town status since: 1785
- Elevation: 10 m (33 ft)

Population (2010 Census)
  - Total: 13,051
  - Estimate (2023): 9,712 (−25.6%)

Administrative status
  - Capital of: Kemsky District

Municipal status
  - Municipal district: Kemsky Municipal District
  - Urban settlement: Kemskoye Urban Settlement
  - Capital of: Kemsky Municipal District, Kemskoye Urban Settlement
- Time zone: UTC+3 (UTC+03:00)
- Postal code: 18661x
- Dialing code: +7 81458
- OKTMO ID: 86612101001
- Website: kem.onego.ru/kem/

Kem (Russian: Кемь; Finnish and Karelian: Kemi, sometimes Vienan Kemi) is a historic town and the administrative center of Kemsky District of the Republic of Karelia, Russia, located on the shores of the White Sea where the Kem River enters it, on the railroad leading from Petrozavodsk to Murmansk. It had a population of 13,051 as of 2010, which was down from previous years.

== History ==
Historical affiliations

Novgorod Republic 1450–1478
Grand Duchy of Moscow 1478–1547
Tsardom of Russia 1547–1721
Russian Empire 1721–1917
Russian Republic 1917
Soviet Russia 1918–1922
Soviet Union 1922–1991
Russian Federation 1991–present

Kem was first mentioned as a demesne of the Novgorod posadnik Marfa Boretskaya in 1450, when she donated it to the Solovetsky Monastery (situated in the White Sea several kilometers off shore). In 1657, a wooden fort was erected there. Also wooden is the town's cathedral, built in 1711–1717. It is an example of the tented roof-construction in old Russian architecture. The cathedral's iconostasis features 17th-century icons from Novgorod.

Town status was granted to Kem in 1785.

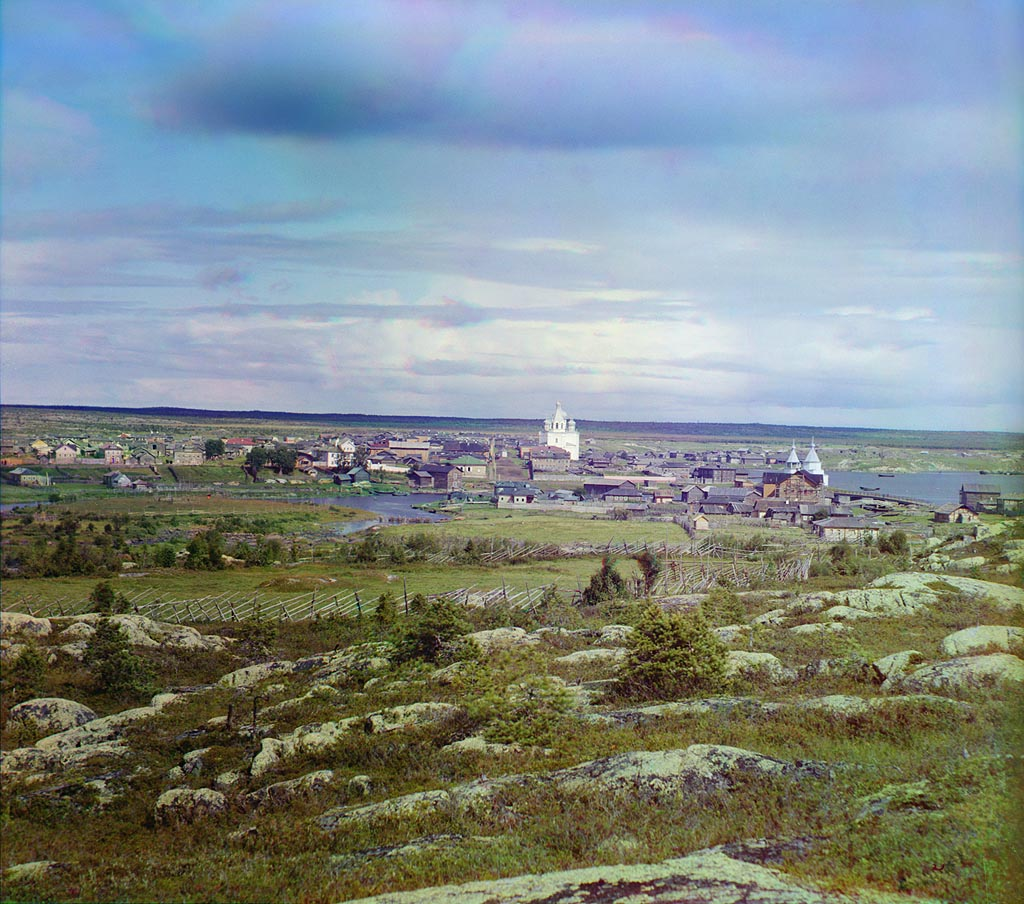
View of Kem in 1916

On April 10, 1918 the town was reached by Finnish volunteer troops during the Viena expedition in an attempt to join White Karelia to Finland. The Finns, however, failed to capture the town and were soon pushed back by Soviet forces.

In 1926–1939, Kem was the site of a transit camp and departure place for boats headed to Solovetsky Islands carrying political prisoners; the road from Kem to Ukhta was built by the labor of Solovki camp prisoners. Allegedly, the Finnish military command planned to rename the town to Vienanlinna (lit. Castle of Viena or Castle of White Karelia) after capturing it during the Continuation War, but the Finnish Army stopped its advance far away from the town in 1941, was pushed back in 1944, and thus never even conquered it. During the Cold War, the town was the site of the Poduzhemye air base, a key interceptor aircraft airfield covering Karelia.

== Geography ==
=== Climate ===
Kem has a subarctic climate (Köppen climate classification: Dfc). It has a significant maritime influence compared with areas further east in the country with cool summers and less severe winters. The temperature regime has more in common with maritime areas on similar parallels in the Nordic countries to the west. It is some way above polar climate due to the milder summers with three months above 10 °C (50 °F) in mean temperature.

Climate data for Kem
Month	Jan	Feb	Mar	Apr	May	Jun	Jul	Aug	Sep	Oct	Nov	Dec	Year
Record high °C (°F)	8.7 (47.7)	6.5 (43.7)	12.0 (53.6)	19.6 (67.3)	29.2 (84.6)	32.5 (90.5)	32.6 (90.7)	32.9 (91.2)	26.7 (80.1)	16.6 (61.9)	11.4 (52.5)	6.9 (44.4)	32.6 (90.7)
Mean daily maximum °C (°F)	−5.9 (21.4)	−5.9 (21.4)	−1.3 (29.7)	3.9 (39.0)	9.6 (49.3)	15.3 (59.5)	18.5 (65.3)	17.2 (63.0)	12.4 (54.3)	5.5 (41.9)	0.0 (32.0)	−3.4 (25.9)	5.5 (41.9)
Daily mean °C (°F)	−9.1 (15.6)	−9.1 (15.6)	−5 (23)	0.2 (32.4)	5.6 (42.1)	11.2 (52.2)	14.7 (58.5)	13.6 (56.5)	9.3 (48.7)	3.2 (37.8)	−2.3 (27.9)	−6.1 (21.0)	2.2 (35.9)
Mean daily minimum °C (°F)	−12.6 (9.3)	−12.8 (9.0)	−9.0 (15.8)	−3.5 (25.7)	2.1 (35.8)	7.6 (45.7)	11.2 (52.2)	10.3 (50.5)	6.3 (43.3)	0.9 (33.6)	−4.8 (23.4)	−9.1 (15.6)	−1.1 (30.0)
Record low °C (°F)	−40.3 (−40.5)	−35.1 (−31.2)	−32.5 (−26.5)	−25.8 (−14.4)	−12.2 (10.0)	−2.6 (27.3)	2.0 (35.6)	0.1 (32.2)	−4.1 (24.6)	−17.0 (1.4)	−26.3 (−15.3)	−34.2 (−29.6)	−40.3 (−40.5)
Average precipitation mm (inches)	27 (1.1)	22 (0.9)	21 (0.8)	28 (1.1)	48 (1.9)	58 (2.3)	65 (2.6)	69 (2.7)	53 (2.1)	53 (2.1)	41 (1.6)	32 (1.3)	524 (20.6)
Source: Pogoda.ru.net

== Administrative and municipal status ==
Within the framework of administrative divisions, Kem serves as the administrative center of Kemsky District, to which it is directly subordinated. As a municipal division, the town of Kem, together with three rural localities, is incorporated within Kemsky Municipal District as Kemskoye Urban Settlement.

== In popular culture ==
Kem was the filming location for the 2006 film The Island.
