= Suoyarvsky District =

Suoyarvsky District Суоярвский район (Russian)
- District
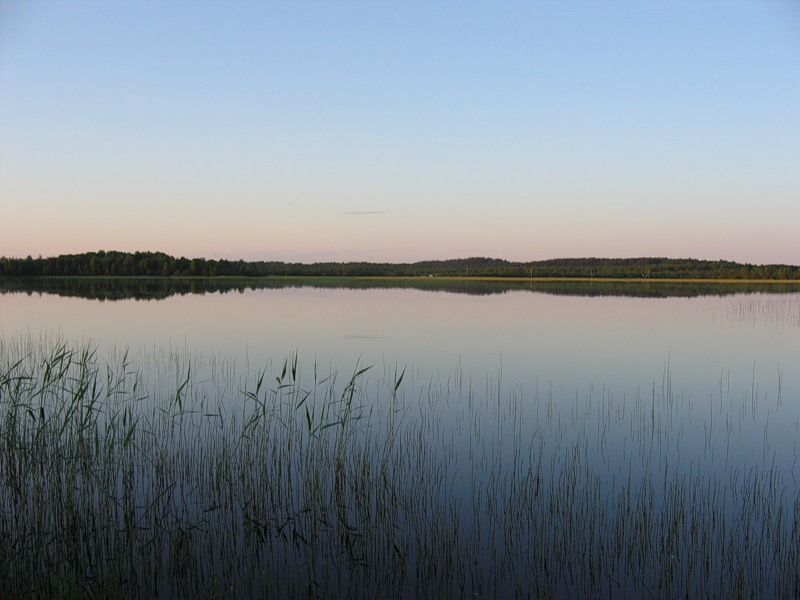
- Lake Suoyarvi in Suoyarvsky District

- Flag Coat of arms
- Location of Suoyarvsky District in the Republic of Karelia
- Coordinates: 62°05′N 32°22′E
- Country: Russia
- Federal subject: Republic of Karelia
- Established: 9 July 1940
- Administrative center: Suoyarvi

Area
  - Total: 13,731 km^{2} (5,302 sq mi)

Population (2010 Census)
  - Total: 18,814
  - Density: 1.3702/km^{2} (3.5488/sq mi)
  - Urban: 51.9%
  - Rural: 48.1%

Administrative structure
  - Inhabited localities: 1 cities/towns, 26 rural localities

Municipal structure
  - Municipally incorporated as: Suoyarvsky Municipal Okrug
- Time zone: UTC+3 (UTC+03:00)
- OKTMO ID: 86650000
- Website: http://suojarvi.ru

Population of Suoyarvsky District
- 2010 Census: 18,814
- 2002 Census: 24,028
- 1989 Census: 26,913
- 1979 Census: 27,788

Suoyarvsky District (Russian: Суоя́рвский райо́н; Karelian: Suojärven piiri) is an administrative district (raion), one of the fifteen in the Republic of Karelia, Russia. It is located in the west of the republic on the Finnish border. The area of the district is 13,731 square kilometers (5,302 sq mi). Its administrative center is the town of Suoyarvi. As of the 2010 Census, the total population of the district was 18,814, with the population of Suoyarvi accounting for 51.9% of that number.

== Administrative and municipal status ==
Within the framework of administrative divisions, Suoyarvsky District is one of the fifteen in the Republic of Karelia and has administrative jurisdiction over one town (Suoyarvi) and twenty-six rural localities. As a municipal division, the district is incorporated as Suoyarvsky Municipal Okrug, covering the territory of the entire district. The municipal okrug was formed in 2022 with the merger of all previous municipalities within the district: the Suoyarvi urban settlement and the rural settlements of Loymola, Naystenyarvi, Porosozero and Veshkelitsa. The town of Suoyarvi serves as the administrative center of both the district and municipal okrug.
