= Olonka =

River in the Republic of Karelia, Russia

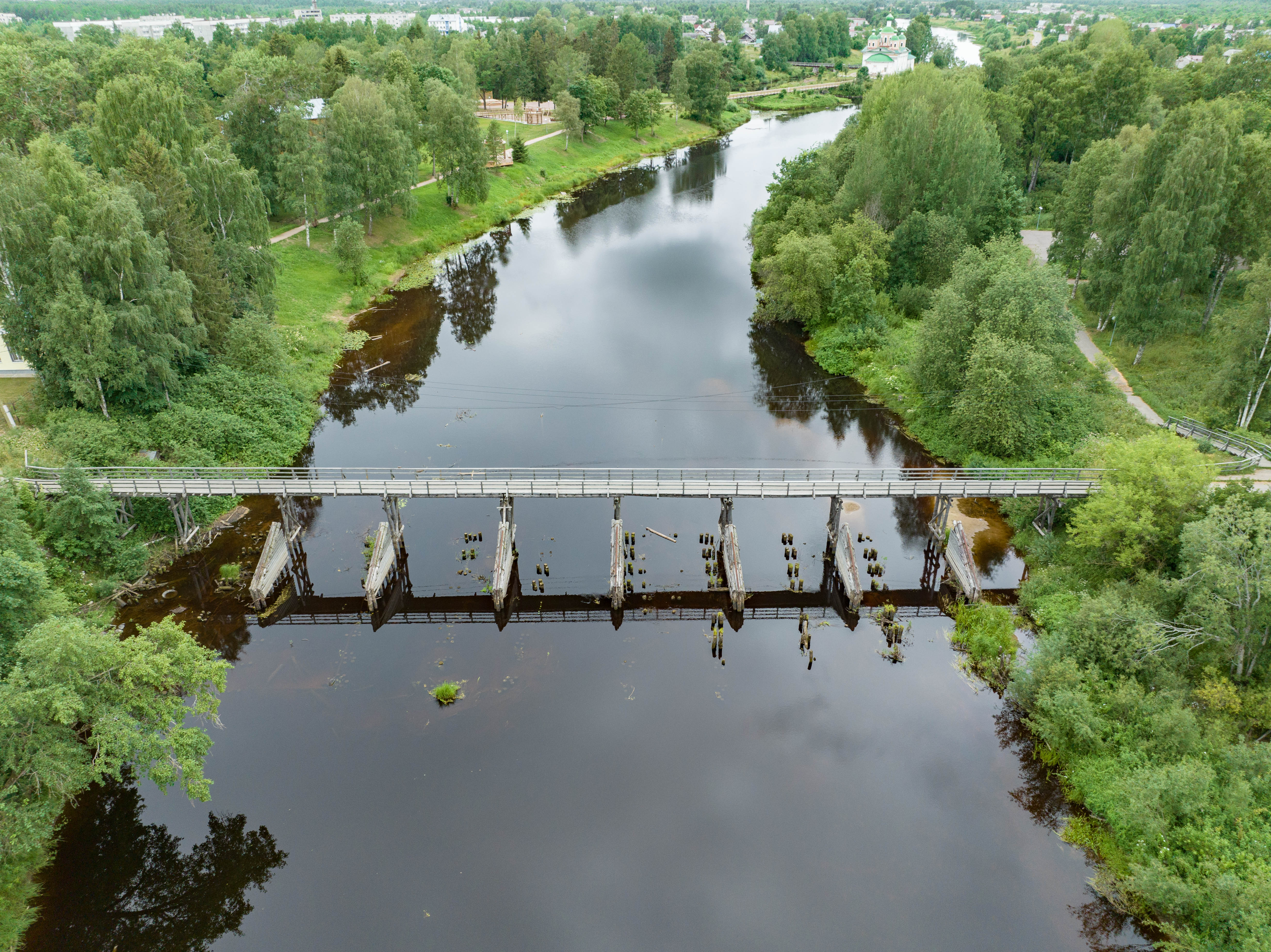

Location
- Country: Russia

Physical characteristics
- Source: Utozero
- Mouth: Lake Ladoga
  - coordinates: 61.0562°N 32.5949°E
- Length: 87 km (54 mi)
- Basin size: 2,620 km^{2} (1,010 sq mi)

Basin features
- Progression: Lake Ladoga→ Neva→ Gulf of Finland

The Olonka (Russian: Олонка, Karelian: Anuksenjogi) is a river in the Republic of Karelia, Russia. It gave the name to the town of Olonets by the river and eventually to the surrounding territory (Olonets Governorate, Olonets Krai, now Olonetsky District). It flows out of the lake Utozero and discharges into Lake Ladoga. It is 87 kilometres (54 mi) long, and has a drainage basin of 2,620 square kilometres (1,010 sq mi).

The 1906 Russian Brockhaus and Efron Encyclopedic Dictionary writes that Olonka flows from Lake Topornoye, through lakes Vagvozero, Utozero and Torosozero, and eventually to Lake Ladoga. The section between Topornoye and Utozero is now referred to as Topornaya (Топорная). The highest point of this drainage chain is Kaskozero, which overspills into Lake Pyyre Järvi (Pyureyarvi, Пюреярви), which is connected by a shallow creek to Topornoye.

Most important tributaries are Megrega (by Olonets) and Tuksa rivers.
