= Olonets =

Town in the Republic of Karelia, Russia

Olonets Олонец Anuksenlinnu (Livvi-Karelian)
- Town
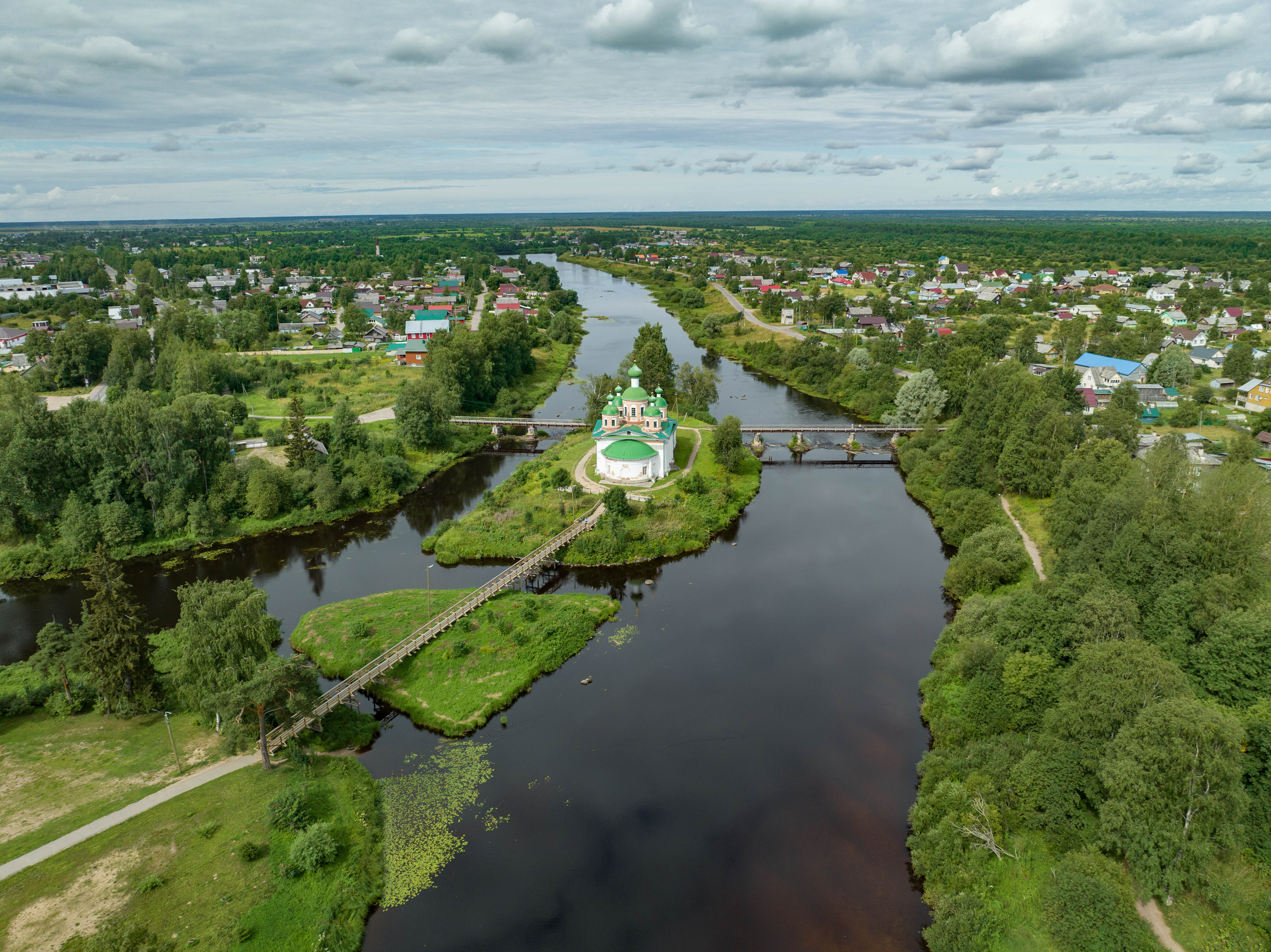
- Aerial view of Olonets

- Flag Coat of arms
- Interactive map of Olonets
- Location of Olonets Olonets (Karelia)
- Coordinates: 60°59′N 32°55′E
- Country: Russia
- Federal subject: Republic of Karelia
- Administrative district: Olonetsky District
- First mentioned: 1137
- Town status since: 1649
- Elevation: 20 m (66 ft)

Population (2010 Census)
  - Total: 9,056
  - Estimate (2023): 7,631 (−15.7%)

Administrative status
  - Capital of: Olonetsky District

Municipal status
  - Municipal district: Olonetsky Municipal District
  - Urban settlement: Olonetskoye Urban Settlement
  - Capital of: Olonetsky Municipal District, Olonetskoye Urban Settlement
- Time zone: UTC+3 (UTC+03:00)
- Postal code: 186000
- OKTMO ID: 86630101001

Olonets (Russian: Оло́нец; Livvi: Anuksenlinnu; Finnish: Aunus, Aunuksenkaupunki or Aunuksenlinna) is a town and the administrative center of Olonetsky District of the Republic of Karelia, Russia, located on the Olonka River to the east of Lake Ladoga.

== Geography ==
Olonets is located at the confluence of the Olonka and Megrega rivers, on the Olonets Plain, 145 km (90 mi) southwest of Petrozavodsk, 299 km (186 mi) northeast of Saint Petersburg along the R 21 highway (Kola highway) and the Lodeynoye Pole–Yanisyarvi railroad.

== History ==
The first known mention of Olonets comes from a Novgorodian document written in 1137, during the reign of Svyatoslav Olgovich. Its history is obscure until 1649, when a fortress was built there to protect the Russian border from Swedish attacks, with the center of the town developing around it. At the end of the 17th century, there were 726 houses in Olonets. Until the Great Northern War, Olonets developed as a principal market for Russian trade with Sweden. To the south from the town, there sprawled a belt of fortified abbeys, of which the Alexander-Svirsky Monastery was the most important.

In the 18th century Olonets' importance shifted from trade to ironworking industries. In 1773 it was made the seat of Olonets Governorate. Eleven years later, however, the seat was moved to Petrozavodsk and Olonets started to decline.

The remains of over one hundred victims of the Great Terror were found when the church of the Icon of the Mother of God was returned to the Orthodox Church in the 1990s and in 2008 a monument was erected by locals in their memory.

Modern Olonets is classified as a historical town of the Republic of Karelia and is the only town in the republic where Karelians are in majority (over 60% as of 2005).

== Administrative and municipal status ==
Within the framework of administrative divisions, Olonets serves as the administrative center of Olonetsky District, under which it is directly subordinated. As a municipal division, the town of Olonets, together with eight rural localities, is incorporated within Olonetsky Municipal District as Olonetskoye Urban Settlement. Along with the town of Olonets, the municipality includes the villages of Immalitsy, Kapshoyla, Putilitsa, Rypushkalitsy, Sudalitsa, Takhtasovo, Tatchelitsa and Verkhovye.

== Education ==
Olonetskaya district station of young naturalists. It was opened on December 17, 1971.

Music, sports and art schools of the city.

Center for Additional Education. It was opened in 1951 as the House of Creativity of children and youth, later – the House of Children's Creativity.

2 secondary schools, six buildings of local preschool institutions.

Olonets branch of Sortavala College (previously the branch was an independent educational institution under the names: PU-2 (in the period from 1962 to 2014), Olonets Technical School – from 2014 to February 2019 before reorganization).

== Attractions ==
The city has preserved the layout of the XVIII century.

- Mass graves of Soviet soldiers at the civil cemetery of Olonets, who died during the Great Patriotic War. 449 Soviet soldiers were buried in mass graves.
- The mass grave of Soviet soldiers and civilians shot by the Belofin invaders during the occupation of Olonets in 1919.
- Monument to Soviet military pilots – participants of the Svir-Petrozavodsk operation (1944). The monument (the wing of a combat aircraft) was installed in 1974 on Karl Marx Street.
- Monument to the heroes of the Olonets underground.
- The monument to the Soviet soldiers-liberators was installed on the street of Svir Divisions in 1969 (76-mm divisional cannon).
- Merchant Kuttuev's house.
- Church of the Smolensk Icon of the Mother of God (1828).
- The Church of the Holy Cross of the Church of Ingria (see the Church of Ingria).
- In the courtyard of one of the houses there are Soviet sculptures of a lion, a woman and a boy.

== City holidays and events ==
- Every year, since 1999, on the initiative of the then mayor of Olonets Vasily Anatolyevich Popov, the Olonets Games of Ded Moroz began to be held on the first day of winter.

== Demographics ==
=== Population ===
Historical population
Year	Pop.	±%
1856	1,200	—
1897	1,200	+0.0%
1913	2,000	+66.7%
1939	2,668	+33.4%
1959	5,009	+87.7%
1970	7,756	+54.8%
1979	10,404	+34.1%
1989	11,888	+14.3%
1992	12,100	+1.8%
1996	11,800	−2.5%
1998	11,600	−1.7%
2002	10,240	−11.7%
2003	10,200	−0.4%
2005	9,800	−3.9%
2006	9,600	−2.0%
2007	9,500	−1.0%
2009	9,217	−3.0%
2010	9,056	−1.7%
2011	9,100	+0.5%
2012	8,818	−3.1%
2013	8,645	−2.0%
2014	8,402	−2.8%
2015	8,249	−1.8%
2016	8,162	−1.1%
2017	8,130	−0.4%
2018	8,091	−0.5%
2019	8,070	−0.3%
2020	8,026	−0.5%
2021	7,663	−4.5%
2023	7,631	−0.4%
Source: Census data

Population: 7,663 (2021 census); 9,056 (2010 census); 10,240 (2002 census); 11,888 (1989 Soviet census).

==== Ethnicity ====
Olonets is the only city on the territory of Karelia where Karelians make up the majority of the population, in addition, the Olonets district is a place of compact residence of Karelian Livviks and the most populated Karelian district of the Republic of Karelia.

Besides Karelians, Olonets is home to such traditional Karelian peoples as Finns, Russians, as well as Belarusians, Ukrainians, Poles and Lithuanians. In relation to the Belarusian and Ukrainian population, this is primarily due to the post-war resettlement from the destroyed villages of Belarus and Ukraine, Karelia was a place of exile for Poles and Lithuanians.

There is a small community of Chechens in Olonets and Olonets district, which is not typical for this region and the republic as a whole. According to the 2002 census, 53 representatives of this nationality live here. In this regard, a number of ethnic conflicts have arisen in the area.

Ethnicity	Population	Percentage
Karelians	5827	58%
Russians	3720	37%
Belarusians	211	2%
Ukrainians	157	1.5%
Finns	126	1.3%

== Telecommunications ==
=== Cellular communication ===
Cellular communication services according to the LTE standard are provided by the operators MTS, MegaFon, Tele2, Beeline, Rostelecom, and Yota.

=== Wired telephone connection ===
The wired telephone connection in the city is provided by Rostelecom PJSC and Svirtelekom LLC.

=== Internet connection ===
High-speed wired Internet connection is provided by the operators Svirtelekom, Rostelecom.

=== Television ===
Digital terrestrial (DVB-T2 standard), satellite, cable TV broadcasting is available in the city.

== Notable people ==
- Walery Mroczkowski (1840–1889) was born in Olonets. He was an insurgent in the 1863 January Uprising. After prison, he was exiled and became a noted anarchist in Bakunin's close circle. Latterly, he worked as a photographer in France, using the pseudonym, "Fr: Valerien Ostroga".
- Witold Pilecki (1901–1948) was born in Olonets. He was an army officer and a member of Armia Krajowa who got himself arrested to infiltrate the Nazi operation in Auschwitz concentration camp. He escaped from the camp and was one of the first direct witnesses of the Final Solution which he reported to his Underground superiors. He took part in the Warsaw Uprising. After WWII he was tried and executed by the Polish communist regime in 1948. He was a decorated Polish National hero.

== International relations ==
=== Twin towns and sister cities ===
Olonets is twinned with:

- Hyrynsalmi, Finland
- Mikkeli, Finland
- Puolanka, Finland
- Ristijärvi, Finland
