= Kemsky District =

Kemsky District Кемский район (Russian)
- District
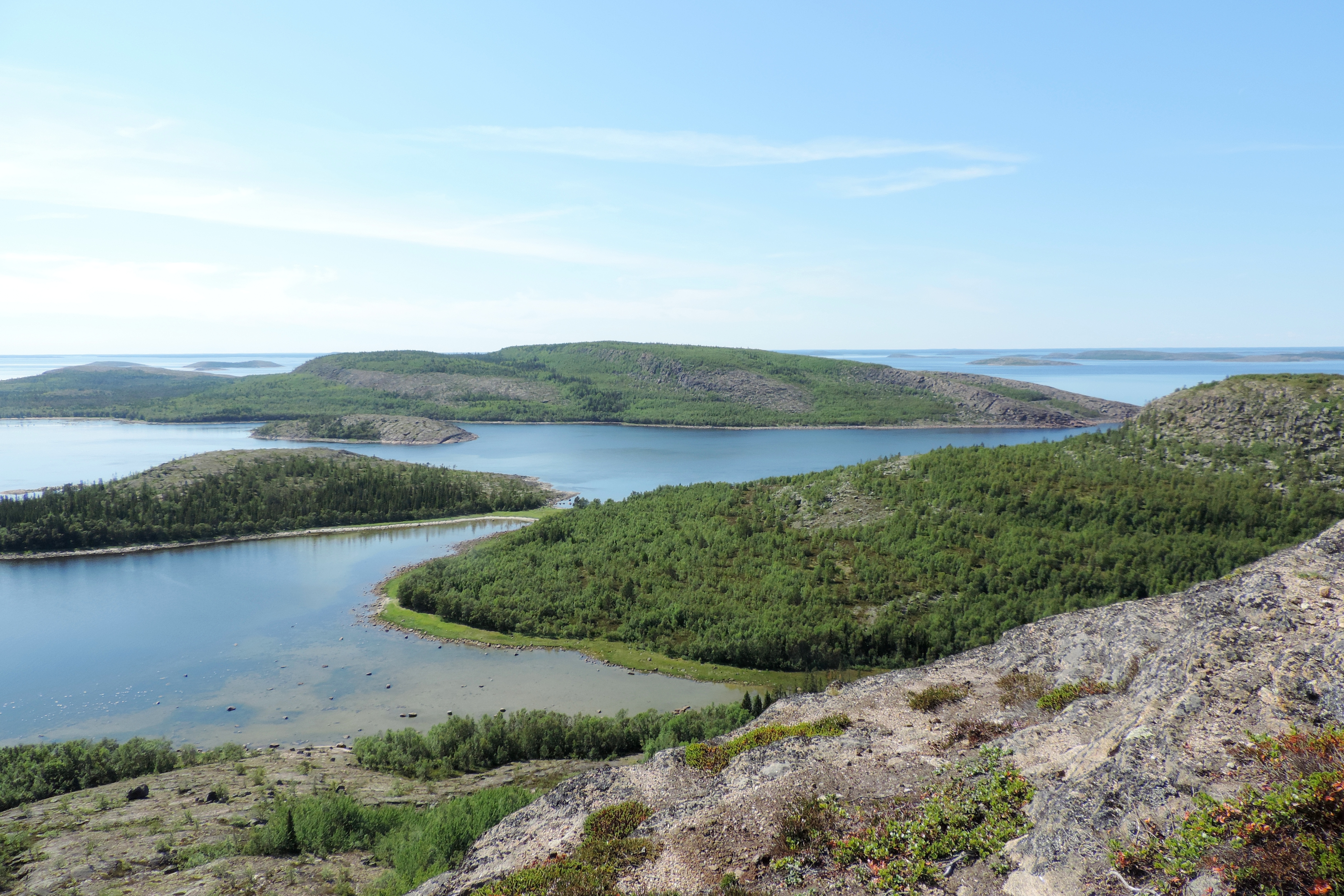
- Kuzova Archipelago, a protected area of Russia in Kemsky District

- Flag Coat of arms
- Location of Kemsky District in the Republic of Karelia
- Coordinates: 64°57′N 34°36′E
- Country: Russia
- Federal subject: Republic of Karelia
- Established: 1927
- Administrative center: Kem

Area
  - Total: 8,029 km^{2} (3,100 sq mi)

Population (2010 Census)
  - Total: 17,756
  - Density: 2.211/km^{2} (5.728/sq mi)
  - Urban: 73.5%
  - Rural: 26.5%

Administrative structure
  - Inhabited localities: 1 cities/towns, 18 rural localities

Municipal structure
  - Municipally incorporated as: Kemsky Municipal District
  - Municipal divisions: 1 urban settlements, 3 rural settlements
- Time zone: UTC+3 (UTC+03:00)
- OKTMO ID: 86612000
- Website: http://www.kemrk.ru

Population of Kemsky District
- 2010 Census: 17,756
- 2002 Census: 5,386
- 1989 Census: 27,346
- 1979 Census: 29,177

Kemsky District (Russian: Ке́мский райо́н; Karelian: Kemin piiri) is an administrative district (raion), one of the fifteen in the Republic of Karelia, Russia. It is located in the northeast of the republic. The area of the district is 8,029 square kilometers (3,100 sq mi). Its administrative center is the town of Kem. As of the 2010 Census, the total population of the district was 17,756, with the population of Kem accounting for 73.5% of that number.

== Administrative and municipal status ==
Within the framework of administrative divisions, Kemsky District is one of the fifteen in the Republic of Karelia and has administrative jurisdiction over one town (Kem) and eighteen rural localities. As a municipal division, the district is incorporated as Kemsky Municipal District. The town of Kem and three rural localities are incorporated into an urban settlement, while the remaining fifteen rural localities are incorporated into three rural settlements within the municipal district. The town of Kem serves as the administrative center of both the administrative and municipal district.
