= Olonetsky District =

Olonetsky District Олонецкий район (Russian)
- District
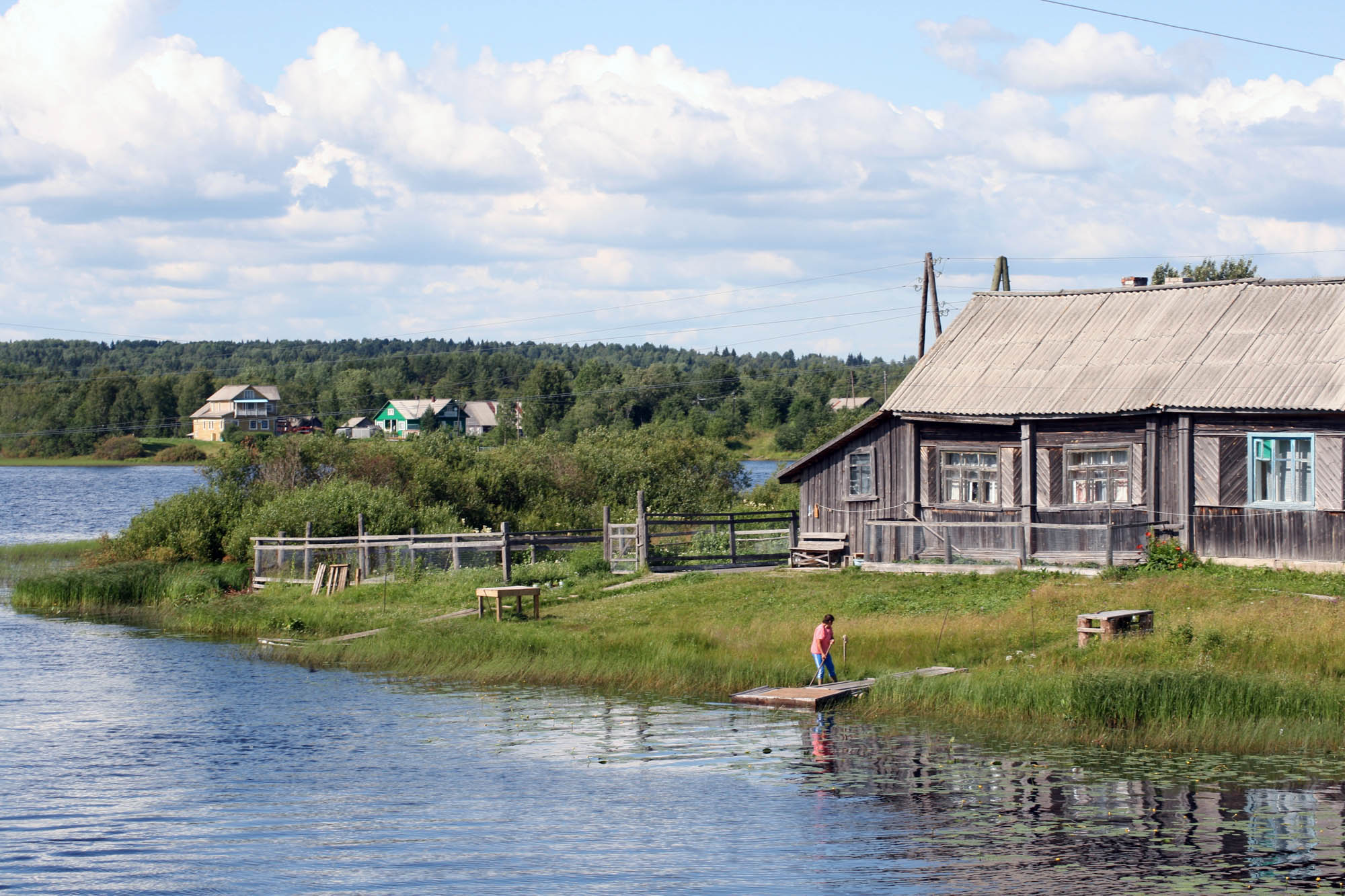
- The village of Kotkozero in Olonetsky District

- Flag Coat of arms
- Location of Olonetsky District in the Republic of Karelia
- Coordinates: 60°59′N 32°58′E
- Country: Russia
- Federal subject: Republic of Karelia
- Established: 29 August 1927
- Administrative center: Olonets

Area
  - Total: 3,988 km^{2} (1,540 sq mi)

Population (2010 Census)
  - Total: 23,124
  - Density: 5.798/km^{2} (15.02/sq mi)
  - Urban: 39.2%
  - Rural: 60.8%

Administrative structure
  - Inhabited localities: 1 cities/towns, 64 rural localities

Municipal structure
  - Municipally incorporated as: Olonetsky Municipal District
  - Municipal divisions: 1 urban settlements, 8 rural settlements
- Time zone: UTC+3 (UTC+03:00)
- OKTMO ID: 86630000
- Website: http://www.olon-rayon.ru

Olonetsky District (Russian: Оло́нецкий райо́н; Karelian: Anuksen piiri) is an administrative district (raion), one of the fifteen in the Republic of Karelia, Russia.

Its administrative center is the town of Olonets.

Olonetsky district is equated to the districts of the far north.

Refers to national areas.

== Geography ==
- The area of the district is 3,988 square kilometers (1,540 sq mi).
- It is located in the southern part of the Republic of Karelia on the Olonets plain.
- It borders:
  - in the north and northwest — with the Pryazhinsky and Pitkyarantsky districts of the Republic of Karelia.
  - in the south and southeast — with the Leningrad Oblast.
- in the southwest has a long (about 120 km) access to Lake Ladoga.

About 90% of the district's territory is occupied by forests and swamps. There are 49 lakes and 11 rivers on the territory of the district.

The nature of the relief is mainly flat. In the north and east of the district there are hills, the most significant is Mount Zheleznaya (97 m).

== Climate ==
The climate is mild, moderately continental. The average temperature in January is -9.9 °C, in July — +16.5 °C. The average annual precipitation is 584 mm.

== Mass media ==
=== Newspapers and magazines ===
- The first regional newspaper "Kolkhoznik" (editor M. Ishukov) was published on August 20, 1930. In 1957-1991, the newspaper was published under the name "Olonetskaya Pravda". Since 1991, it has been published under the name "Olonia".

== History ==
The district was formed on August 29, 1927 as part of the Autonomous Karelian SSR. In 1930, the Vidlitsky district of the Autonomous Karelian SSR became part of the district.

During the Soviet-Finnish War (1941-1944), the territory of the district was occupied. The territory of the district was liberated by Soviet troops in the summer of 1944 during the Svir-Petrozavodsk operation.

On May 23, 1957, part of the territory of the abolished Pitkyarantsky district was annexed to the Olonetsky district.

== Administrative and municipal status ==
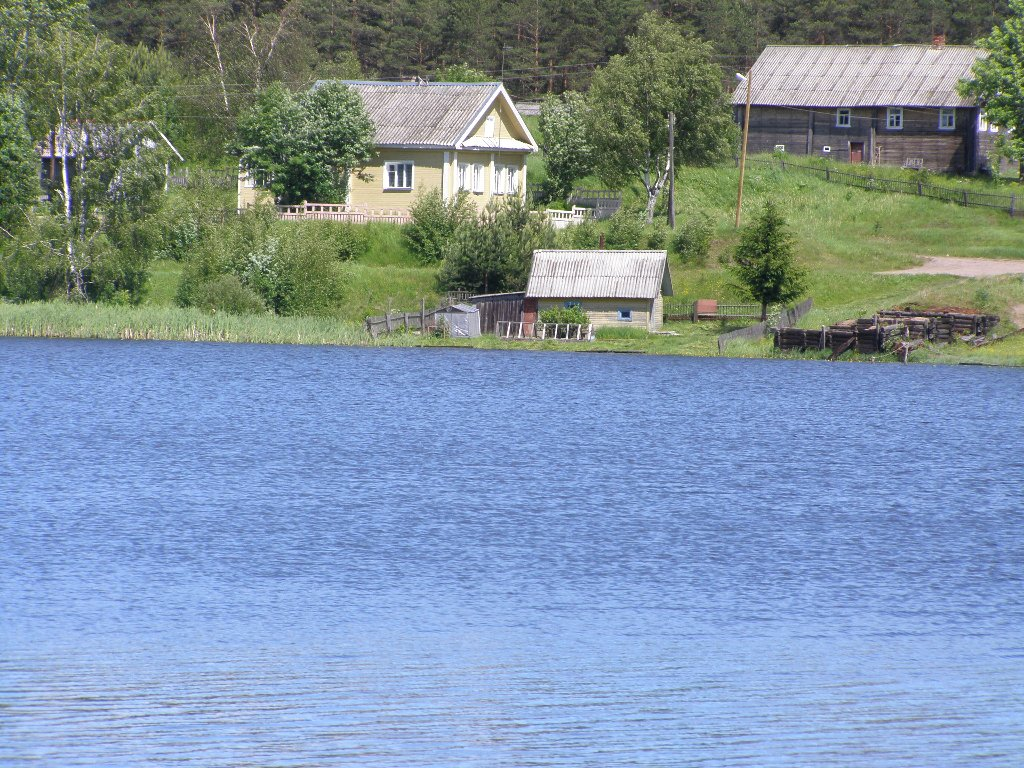
Nurmolitsy village of Olonetsky district of Karelia

Within the framework of administrative divisions, Olonetsky District is one of the fifteen in the Republic of Karelia and has administrative jurisdiction over one town (Olonets) and sixty-four rural localities. As a municipal division, the district is incorporated as Olonetsky Municipal District. The town of Olonets and eight rural localities are incorporated into an urban settlement, while the remaining fifty-six rural localities are incorporated into eight rural settlements within the municipal district. The town of Olonets serves as the administrative center of both the administrative and municipal district.

== Economy ==
The basis of the district's economy is the forestry industry, timber processing and agriculture (crop production, meat and dairy farming, animal husbandry). Tourism activity is developing.

== Transport ==
=== Automobile communication ===
The federal highway «Kola» passes through the district.

The district is connected by regular bus routes with Petrozavodsk, St. Petersburg, Sortavala. Commuter flights from Olonets to Verkhny Olonets, Vidlitsa, Ilyinsky, Tuksy, Kovera, Megrega, Rypushkalitsa and Verkhovye.

=== Railway ===
Railway line Yanisjarvi — Lodeynoye Pole.

== Attractions ==
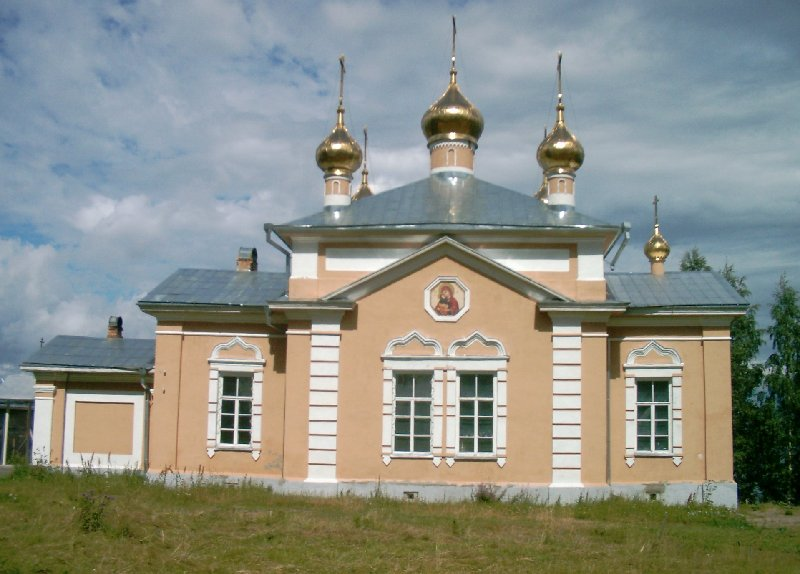
The church of the Vazheozersky Spaso-Preobrazhensky Monastery. The village of Interposelok Olonetsky district.

More than 130 monuments of historical and cultural heritage have been preserved on the territory of the district.

- Chapel of St. George the Victorious (wooden) of the XVIII century in the village of Pertiselga
- Cross of Worship in the village of Tatchelitsa (the first half of the 19th century)
- Vazheozersky Spaso-Preobrazhensky Monastery (built in 1520)
- Olonets National Museum of Karelians-Livviks named after N. G. Prilukin
- Flora and Lavra Church in the village of Megrega (founded in 1613)
- Chapel of Michael, Peter and Paul (XVIII century) in the village of Novinka
- Dubrovin's house in the village of Bolshaya Selga (the first half of the 19th century)
- The village of Bolshaya Selga (houses and buildings of the 19th century have been preserved here)

== Demographics ==
Olonetsky District is the only district in the republic where Karelians form a majority of the population (63.4% in 1989). Natural population growth rate was -12.02 per 1,000 in 1994.

Population of Olonetsky District
- 2010 Census: 23,124
- 2002 Census: 27,034
- 1989 Census: 30,497
- 1979 Census: 29,616

== Notable natives and residents ==
Artamonov Ivan Ilyich (1914-1985) — Hero of the Soviet Union, a native of the village of Stepannavolok.

Vladimir Egorovich Brandoev (1931-1990) was a Karelian poet and translator, a native of Berezhnaya village.

Mikhail Konstantinovich Kononov (1923-2005) was an economic and party leader, a native of the city of Olonets.

Ivan Petrovich Kuzmin (1928-2002) — Honored School teacher of the RSFSR, a native of the village of Matchezero.

Heroes of Socialist Labor worked in the district — I. V. Chaikin, S. V. Sablin, F. F. Koshkin.

== See also ==
- Olonets Governorate of the Russian Empire and the early Russian SFSR
