= Impilahti =

Impilahti Импила́хти Imbilahti (Karelian)
- Settlement
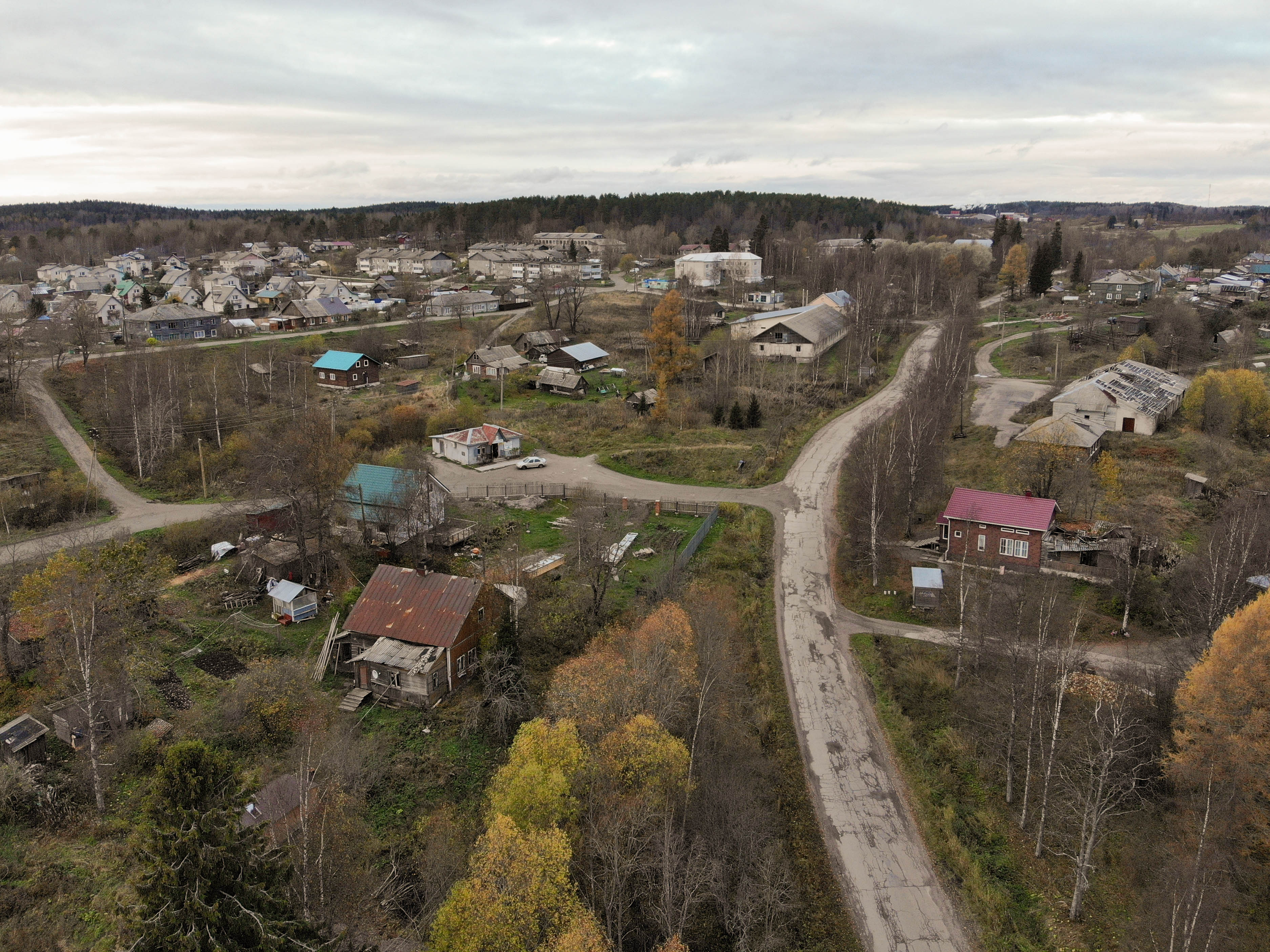
- An aerial view of Impilahti in 2020.

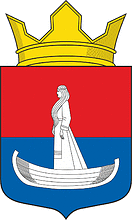
- Coat of arms
- Interactive map of Impilahti
- Location of Impilahti Impilahti (Karelia)
- Coordinates: 61°40′14.88″N 31°09′16.47″E
- Country: Russia
- Federal subject: Republic of Karelia
- Charter: 1638

Population
  - Estimate (2021): 568 )

Municipal status
  - Municipal district: Pitkyarantsky Municipal District
- Time zone: UTC+3 (UTC+03:00)
- Postal code: 186801
- OKTMO ID: 86633405101

Impilahti (Russian: Импила́хти; Karelian: Imbilahti; Swedish: Impilax) is a rural locality in the Republic of Karelia, Russia, located at the northern tip of Lake Ladoga near the Finnish border, about 200 kilometres (120 mi) west of Petrozavodsk, the capital city of the Republic of Karelia. The nearest town is Sortavala, which is located about 40 kilometres (25 mi) west of Sortavala. Before World War II, the area belonged to Finland, after which it became part of the Soviet Union.

In 2012 the population of Impilahti was about one thousand. According to the 2010 census, 74% of the population are Russian, 9% Belarusian, 7% Karelian, 3% Ukrainian and 2% Finnish.

== Geography ==
In addition to Lake Ladoga, there are other smaller lakes in Impilahti and several rivers flow in the area. Most of the land area is forest. Minerals include granite, gneiss, amphibolite, slate, sand and gravel.

== History ==
The earliest information about Impilakhti dates back to the XVI century. In the census salary book of the Vodskaya Pyatina of 1500, in the description of the Nikolsky Serdovolsky pogost of the Novgorod land, the following settlements are mentioned in the area of the current settlement:

- «Imbilaksha village on the Inba cape near Lake Ladoga in Lakhta» (3 yards) — in Ostrovskaya perevara;
- «village Imbilaksha over Lahtoyu» (1 yard) — in Ostrovskaya perevara;
- «village of Gunushkovo on the Inbinsky cape» (4 yards) — in Arendezhskaya perevara;
- «Inbilaksha village» (2 courtyards) — in Keresyurskaya perevara;
- «village on the Imbilsky cape» (4 yards) — in Undoyalskaya perevara;
- «Imbilaksha village near Lake Ladoga in Lakhta» (1 yard).

The first five villages at the time of the description belonged to the Karelian governor. The latter belonged to the possessions of the Valaam Monastery.

In 1617, under the terms of the Stolbovsky Peace Treaty, Impilakhti, along with the rest of the territory of the Korel uezd, became part of Sweden.

In 1721, according to the Nystad Peace Treaty, the settlement was returned to the Russian Empire. Since 1744 — as part of the Vyborg governorate, which in 1811 became part of the Grand Duchy of Finland.

In 1870, a school was opened in the city. Since 1873, a sawmill has been operating . In 1932, the Lyaskel — Pitkyaranta railway was completed; it passed three kilometers from the church (has not been preserved).

Since 1917, Impilahti has been part of the newly independent Finland.

After the end of the Soviet-Finnish War (1939–1940), the settlement was transferred to the USSR, on July 9, 1940, it became part of the Pitkyarantsky district of the Karelo-Finnish SSR.

During the Soviet-Finnish War (1941–1944), from July 1941 to September 1944, the settlement was occupied by Finnish troops, and a camp for Soviet prisoners of war No. 10 was located in the settlement.

By the Decree of the Presidium of the Supreme Soviet of the Karelo-Finnish SSR of December 30, 1944, Impilakhti was classified as an urban-type settlement; in 1991 it was again transformed into a rural settlement.

From May 23, 1957, it was part of the Sortavalsky district (from February 1, 1963, to January 12, 1965 — as part of the Priladozhsky rural district), from December 30, 1966 — again as part of the Pitkyarantsky district.

== Sights and tourism ==
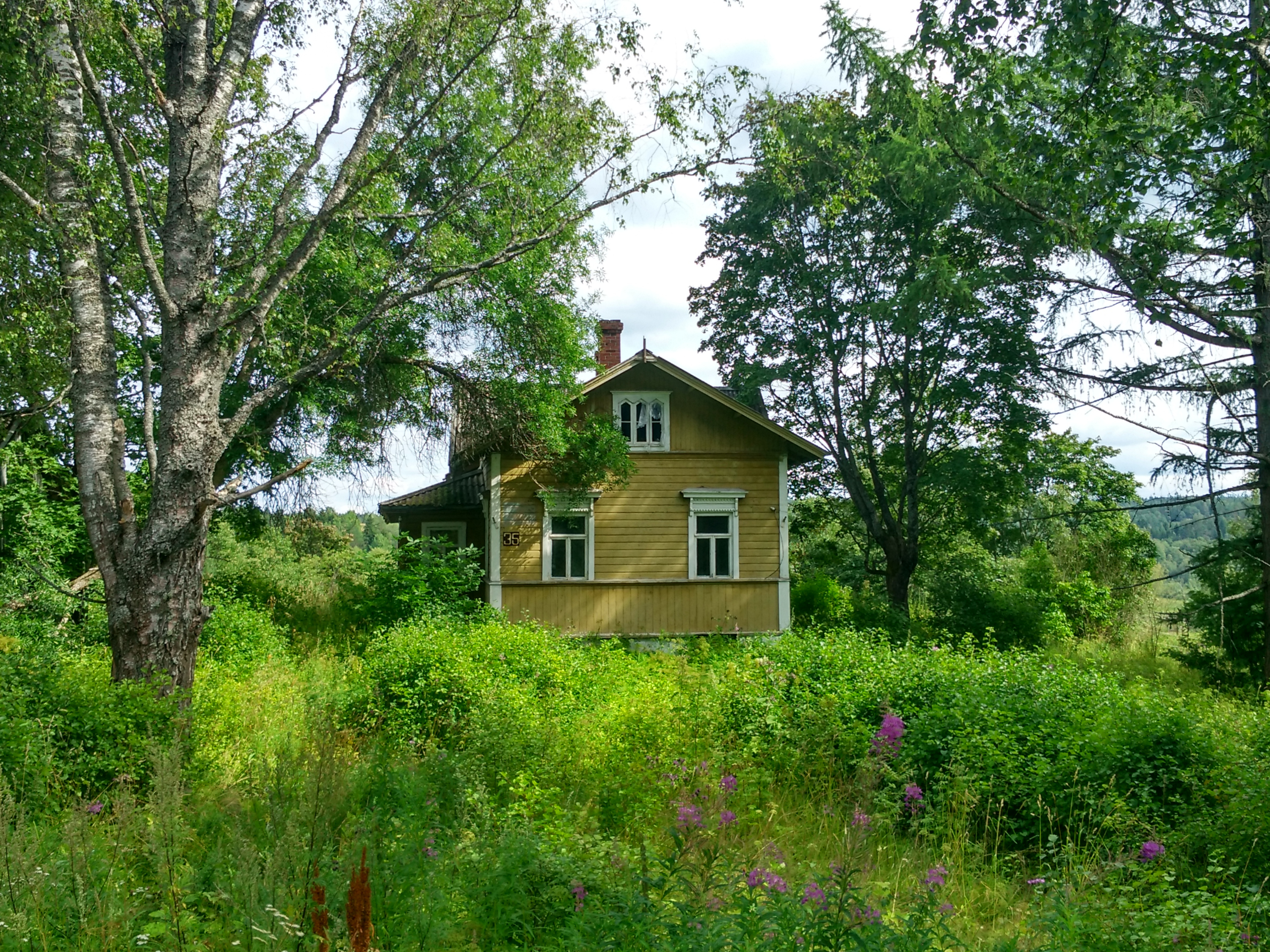
The Konov House, preserved from the Finnish period

To the east of the village of Leppäsilta is a Stone Age settlement. Impilahti's center has the status of a historical settlement. Building monuments include the preserved Impilahti parsonage, school, bank and hotel from the Finnish era, as well as two residential buildings. Impilahti has the graves of Soviet and Finnish soldiers who fell in the Winter and Continuation War, as well as Soviet prisoners of war. The municipality also has several holiday villages and hunting lodges.

== Transportation ==
The A130 highway between Olonets and Sortavala passes through Impilahti. There are bus connections from the center to Pitkyaranta and Sortavala.

== Industry ==
In Impilahti, there are two fish farms, a cattle farm, a sewing factory and a building materials industry. From 2003 to 2022, a sawmill owned by Stora Enso operated in Impilahti.

== Notable people ==
- Aleksanteri Ahola-Valo (1900–1997), artist and architect
- Aleksander Auvinen (1857–1918), Lutheran priest and politician
- Arvid Genetz (1848–1915), politician, poet and linguist
- Emil Genetz (1852–1930), composer
- William Kanerva (1902–1956), footballer
- Ensio Koivunen (1930–2003), serial killer
- Mauno Luukkonen (born 1934), biathlete
- Mikko Piitulainen (1878–1935), farmer, attorney and politician
- Pentti Saarikoski (1937–1983), poet
- Jaakko Seise (1876–1935), businessman, a member of the Finnish White Guard and a Nazi politician
- Elias Simojoki (1899–1940), clergyman
- Basilius Suosaari (born Vasili Tichanoff; 1861–1939), Finnish-Australian politician and farmer
- Alli Vaittinen-Kuikka (1918–2006), nurse, midwife and politician

== See also ==
- Sortavala
