= 2000 in art =

The year 2000 in art involved various significant events.

== Events ==
- February – Opening of the New Art Gallery Walsall in the West Midlands of England.
- 13 February – The final original Peanuts comic strip is published, following the death of its creator, Charles Schulz.
- 9 March – The FBI arrests art forgery suspect Ely Sakhai in New York City.
- May – Christie's withdraws a forgery of Paul Gauguin's Vase de Fleurs (Lilas) from auction.
- 11 May – Official opening of the Tate Modern in London.
- 7 August – DeviantART is launched in the United States.
- 12 October – Official opening of The Lowry theatre and gallery centre in Salford, England (designed by Michael Wilford and Buro Happold).
- 22 December – Nationalmuseum robbery: a self-portrait by Rembrandt and two Renoir paintings are stolen from the museum in Stockholm in Sweden.
- Full date unknown
  - First publication of the Hockney–Falco thesis in art history.
  - Constantine Andreou receives the Légion d'honneur.

== Exhibitions ==
- Felix Gonzalez-Torres retrospective at the Serpentine Gallery, London
- Jean-Baptiste-Siméon Chardin exhibition at the Metropolitan Museum of Art, New York City
- Excessivism exhibition at the LA Artcore Gallery, Los Angeles, CA

== Works ==
- Lee Bae - issu du Feu (part of an ongoing series)
- Jake and Dinos Chapman – Hell
- Eduardo Chillida – Berlin (sculpture)
- Martin Creed – Work No. 227: The lights going on and off (installation)
- Lucian Freud - After Cézanne
- Diana Lee Jackson – Statue of Bill Bowerman (sculpture, Eugene, Oregon)
- Leo Lankinen (died 1996) – Cross of Sorrow (memorial in Russian Karelia)
- Lorenzo Pace – Triumph of the Human Spirit (public monument, Foley Square, New York City)
- Tad Savinar – Constellation (sculpture series, Portland, Oregon)
- Ian Sinclair, Jackie Staude, David Davies and Alistair Knox – Fairfield Industrial Dog Object
- Betty Spindler – Hot Dog (ceramic sculpture, Smithsonian American Art Museum)
- Paul Tzanetopoulos with Ted Tonio Tanaka architects – "Untitled" (kinetic light installation, LAX, Los Angeles)
- Rachel Whiteread – Judenplatz Holocaust Memorial, Vienna
- Bill Woodrow – Regardless of History, for the Fourth plinth, Trafalgar Square, London
- Makoto Yukimura – Planetes

== Awards ==
- Archibald Prize – Adam Cullen, Portrait of David Wenham
- Beck's Futures – Roderick Buchanan
- Hugo Boss Prize – Marjetica Potrč
- Turner Prize – Wolfgang Tillmans

== Films ==
- Pollock

== Deaths ==
- 17 January – Norman Blamey, British painter (b. 1914)
- 19 February – Friedensreich Hundertwasser, Austrian painter, architect and sculptor (b. 1928)
- 26 February – Louisa Matthíasdóttir, Icelandic-American painter (b. 1917)
- 31 March – Gisèle Freund, German-born French photographer (b. 1908)
- 15 April
  - Edward Gorey, American illustrator (b. 1925)
  - Todd Webb, American photographer (b. 1905)
- 16 April – Henry Bird, British muralist (b. 1909)
- 26 April – Gregory Gillespie, American magic realist painter (b. 1936)
- 8 May – Stanley Boxer, American painter (b. 1926)
- 3 June – Leonard Baskin, American sculptor, book-illustrator, wood-engraver, printmaker and graphic artist (b. 1922)
- 9 June – Jacob Lawrence, African American painter (b. 1917)
- 2 July - Constance Howard, English textile artist (b. 1910)
- 10 July – Gertrud Arndt, German photographer (b. 1903)
- 17 July – Aligi Sassu, Italian painter and sculptor (b. 1912)
- 5 August – Tullio Crali, Italian Futurist painter (b. 1910)
- 25 August – Carl Barks, American illustrator and comic book creator (b. 1901)
- 19 September – Anthony Robert Klitz, English artist (b. 1917)
- 19 October – Hans Moller, German born American painter
- 3 December – Frank Roper, English metal sculptor and stained glass artist (b. 1914)
- 4 December – Ansgar Elde, Swedish ceramic artist (b. 1933)
