= Pitkyarantsky =

Pitkyarantsky (masculine), Pitkyarantskaya (feminine), or Pitkyarantskoye (neuter) may refer to:

- Pitkyarantsky District, a district of the Republic of Karelia, Russia
- Pitkyarantskoye Urban Settlement, a municipal formation which the town of Pitkyaranta and three rural localities in Pitkyarantsky District of the Republic of Karelia, Russia are incorporated as
