= Genetz =

Genetz is a surname. Notable people with the surname include:

- Arvid Genetz (1848–1915), Finnish politician, poet, and linguist
- Emil Genetz (1852–1930), Finnish composer
