= Cross of Sorrow =

Coordinates: 61.6756°N 31.4514°E

Cross of Sorrow monument

The Cross of Sorrow (Finnish: 'Surunristi', Russian: Крест скорби, "Krest skorbi") is a memorial in Russia dedicated to the thousands of soldiers of both sides who perished in the Winter War of 1939–1940 when the Soviet Union attacked Finland. It is located in Pitkyarantsky District, Karelia, near the crossroads Pitkyaranta – Suojarvi / Petrozavodsk – Vyartsilya, 19 km off Pitkyaranta. It is the first monument to the Winter War in Russia.

It is a 5-metre (16 ft) cast-iron cross with Finnish and Russian mothers leaning to it from the opposite sides in sorrow for the dead. It is located on an artificial mound, on which groups of stones are placed to symbolize the perished soldiers.

It was unveiled on June 27, 2000, in the presence of government delegations of Russia and Finland. Its construction was planned according to the joint Russian-Finnish agreement about the cooperation in preserving the memory of those who perished in the war, adopted in 1992. The author of the monument is Karelian sculptor Leo Lankinen, who won the contest of the projects. Because of his death, the monument was finished by Karelian sculptor Eduard Akulov, with overall planning of the site carried out by architect Lia Karma, with the help of Finnish landscape experts Seppo Hiekala and Seppo Rosenberg from Kuopio, Finland, where a committee in support of the construction of the monument was established. The project was financed by many contributors from Karelia, Moscow and Kuopio.

Composer Viktor Kramarenko wrote the requiem Cross of Sorrow.

The monument was erected in an area of heavy fighting. When on December 10, 1939, the Red Army captured Pitkyaranta, the Finnish side prepared a strong resistance, and the battles which continued until February were extremely fierce. The Red Army lost at least 35,000 soldiers, its heaviest losses of World War II in northern areas of the Eastern Front. The Finnish side lost an estimated 6,000 soldiers. The surrounding area, locally known as "the valley of death", constitutes the historic-memorial complex "The Valley of the Heroes" (Долина Героев), with graves and remnants of fortifications.

== Gallery ==
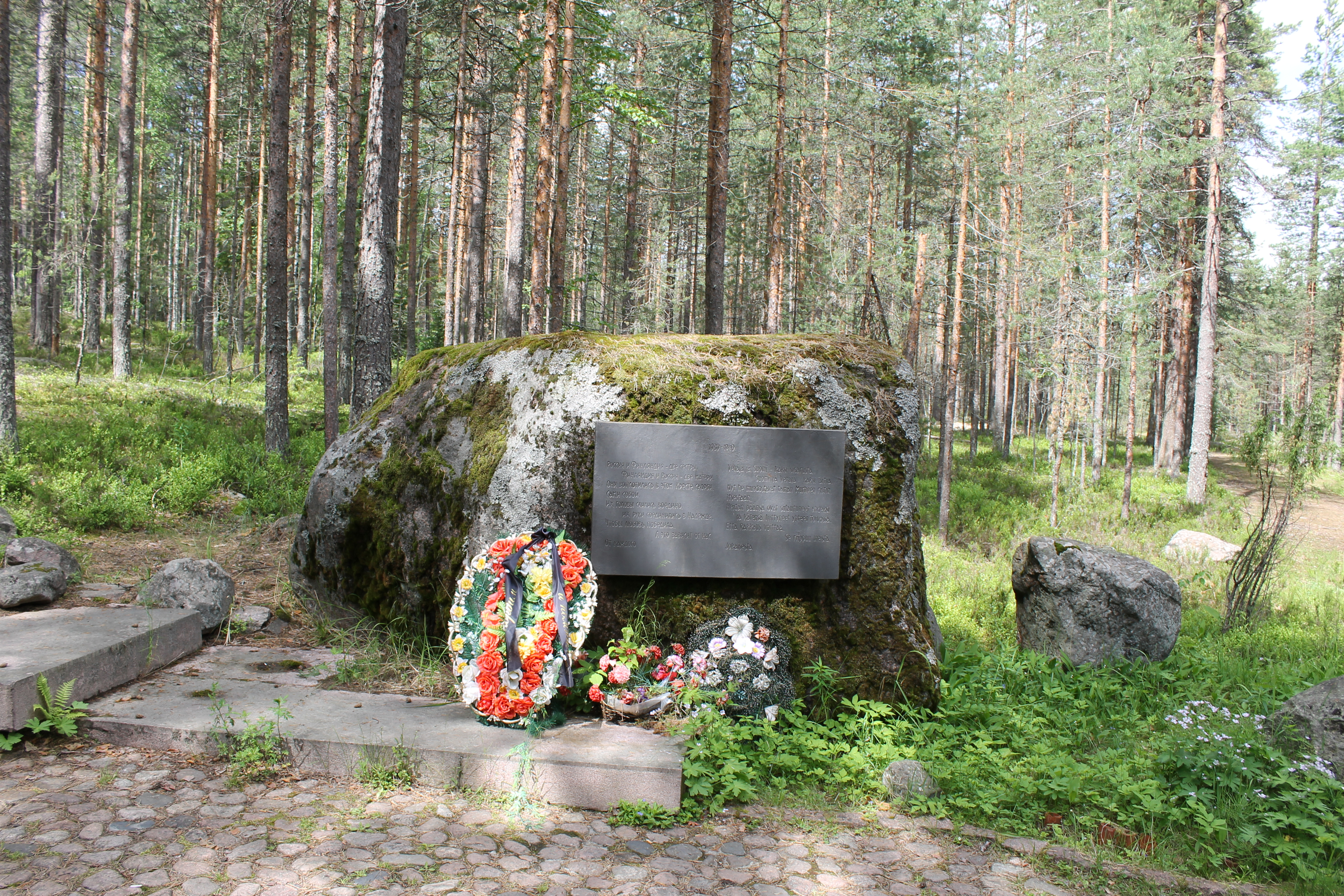
Memorial plaque

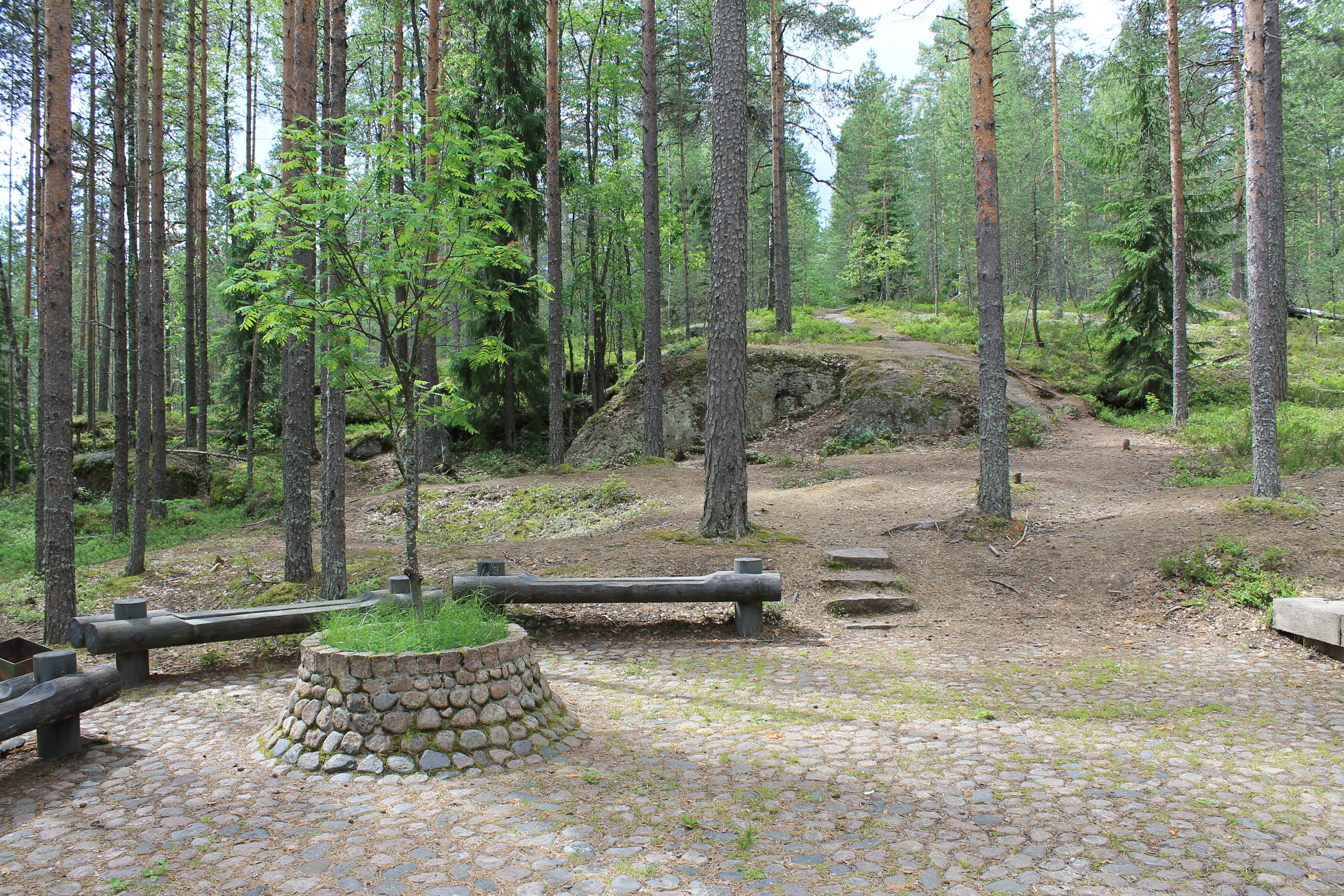
Rest place "Glade of Sorrow"
