= Lankinen =

Lankinen (Langinen) is a Finnish surname. Notable people with the surname include:

- Kevin Lankinen (born 1995), Finnish ice hockey goaltender
- Leo Lankinen (1926–1996), Karelian sculptor and artist
- Mikko Lankinen, Finnish musician
- Timo Lankinen, Finnish statesman, Undersecretary of State
