= Koivunen =

Koivunen is a Finnish surname. Notable people with the surname include:

- Aimo Koivunen (1917–1989), Finnish soldier
- Anna Koivunen (born 2001), Finnish footballer
- Ari Koivunen (born 1984), Finnish heavy metal singer
- Brita Koivunen (1931–2014), Finnish schlager singer
- Ensio Kalevi Koivunen (1930–2003), Finnish serial killer
- Hannes Koivunen (1911–1990), Finnish boxer
- Matti Koivunen (1919–1997), Finnish construction worker and politician
- Tuulikki Koivunen Bylund (born 1947), Finnish-born Swedish theologian
- Ville Koivunen (born 2003), Finnish ice hockey player
