= Auvinen =

Auvinen is a Finnish surname. Notable people with the surname include:

- Aleksander Auvinen (1857–1918), Finnish Lutheran priest and politician
- Anna Auvinen (born 1987), Finnish football defender
- Eero-Matti Auvinen (born 1996), Finnish football player
- Henri Auvinen (born 1993), Finnish ice hockey player
- Pekka-Eric Auvinen (1989–2007), Finnish mass murderer
- Ritva Auvinen (1932–2026), Finnish operatic singer and voice teacher
- Vili Auvinen (1931–1996), Finnish actor and theatre director
