= Päivi =

Päivi is a Finnish female given name, derived from the word ‘päivä’, meaning ‘day’. Its name day is June 16.

Some notable people with this name:

- Päivi Aaltonen (born 1952), retired Finnish archer
- Päivi Alafrantti (born 1964), retired Finnish javelin thrower
- Päivi Istala (born 1947), Finnish journalist
- Päivi Räsänen (born 1959), Finnish politician
- Päivi Setälä (1943–2014), Finnish historian and professor
