= Suoyarvi (disambiguation) =

Suoyarvi is a town in the Republic of Karelia, Russia

Suoyarvi may also refer to:

- Lake Suoyarvi, a lake in Russia from which the Shuya River flows
- Suoyarvi I, a railway station in the town of Suoyarvi, Republic of Karelia, Russia
- Suoyarvi II, a railway station in the town of Suoyarvi, Republic of Karelia, Russia
