= Aleksanteri =

Aleksanteri is a masculine Finnish given name. Notable people with the name include:

- Aleksanteri Aava (1883–1956), Finnish poet
- Aleksanteri Ahola-Valo (1900–1997), Finnish artist and architect
- Aleksanteri Saarvala (1913–1989), Finnish gymnast
- Aleksanteri Toivola (1893–1987), Finnish sport wrestler
- Veikko Aleksanteri Heiskanen (1895–1971), Finnish geodesist

== See also ==
- Aleksanteri Institute, an institute of the University of Helsinki
