= Jaakko Seise =

Finnish businessman (1876-1935)

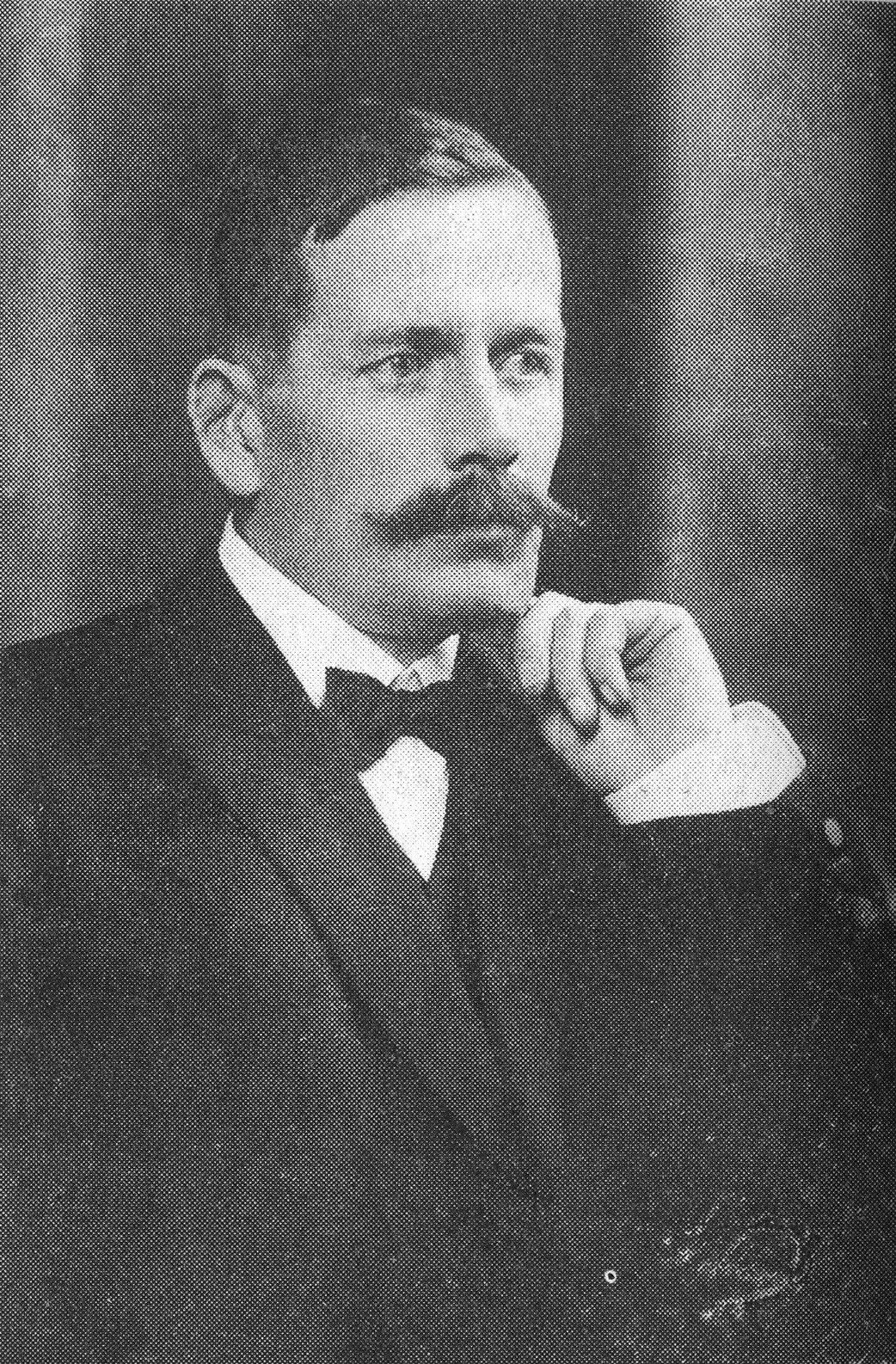
Jaakko Seise in the early 20th century.

Jaakko Andreinpoika Seise (Jakov Andrejev Sjelajev) (14 March 1876 Impilahti – 12 January 1935 Salmi) was a Finnish businessman, a member of the White Guard and a Nazi politician.

Seise, who was Karelian, was born in the village of Nietjärvi, the parish of Impilahti, and after primary school he worked, among other things, as a shop assistant, later engaging in timber trade and log driving. In addition, he ran his own general store in the village of Tulema, the parish of Salmi. After unsuccessful businesses, Seise was admitted to the Salmi Court in 1900 as a clerk and later as the archivist of the Ranta Court. As a result of his knowledge of the law, he began working as a self-taught lawyer, after which Seise was able to resume his business. He had his own tugboats and barges that transported timber over Ladoga to St. Petersburg and brought grain, among other things, on the return journey. However, with the Russian Revolution in 1917, trading with the people of St. Petersburg ceased. At the same time, Seise also lost his sight.

In Salmi, he was active in social life and was nicknamed the "Emperor of Salmi". Seise was a handyman at a local youth club and school project, among other things. After the outbreak of the Finnish Civil War, in January 1918, he founded the Salmi White Guard and also serving as its chief of staff. Two years later, despite his blindness, Seise was involved in the Aunus expedition and was also part of the Aunus interim administration that ruled the area. Seise's daughter's husband was Ragnar Nordström, a shipowner who had taken part in the Aunus expedition.

In the 1930s, Seise became interested in Nazism and was a candidate for the Finnish People's Organisation (SKJ) in the 1933 parliamentary elections on his own list in the eastern constituency of Vyborg County. He received a total of 630 votes, of which 520 came from the parish of Salmi. Seise's votes accounted for almost a quarter of SKJ's total votes.
