= Harlu (village) =

Harlu Ха́рлу
- Interactive map of Harlu
- Location of Harlu Harlu (Karelia)
- Coordinates: 61°48′20″N 30°56′10″E
- Country: Russia
- Federal subject: Republic of Karelia

Population
  - Estimate (2021): 626 )

Municipal status
  - Municipal district: Pitkyarantsky District
- Time zone: UTC+3 (UTC+03:00)
- Postal code: 186806
- OKTMO ID: 86633430101

Harlu (Russian: Ха́рлу) is a rural settlement in the Pitkyarantsky district of the Republic of Karelia in Russia.

The name also refers to historical settlements.

== History ==
=== Finnish period 1918–1940 ===
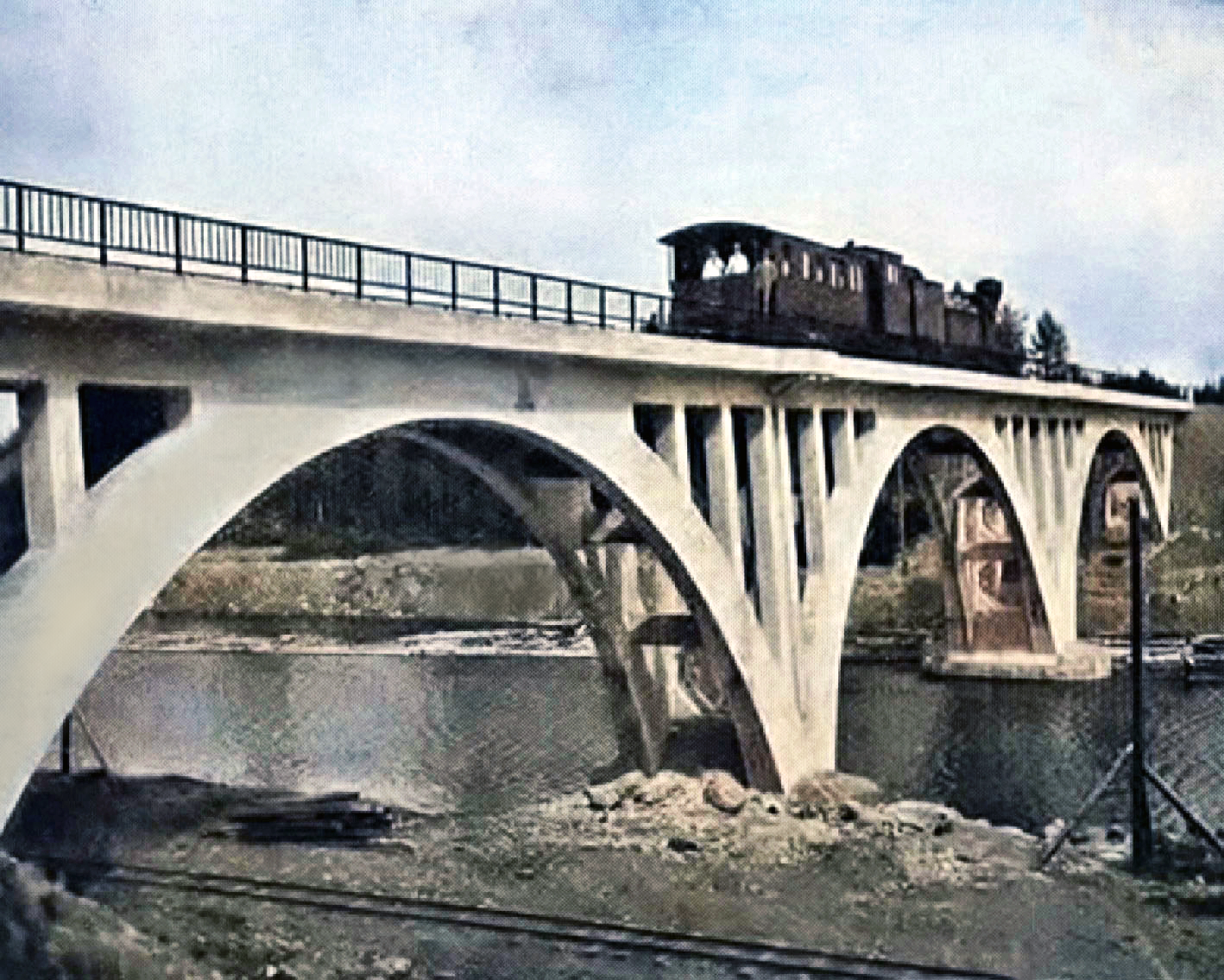
Railway bridge across the Janisjoki River, 1926

=== Modern Period (1991-present) ===
In the 1990s, a significant portion of the settlement's businesses ceased operations due to bankruptcy, but at the same time, several new private firms opened: in 2015, a woodworking plant was established on the site of a former furniture and ski factory.

=== Climate ===
Thanks to its special microclimate, the village, which previously belonged to the Sortavala district, as well as Sortavala, located 32 kilometers away, is favorable for patients with heart and lung diseases (especially pulmonary tuberculosis).

== Social infrastructure facilities ==
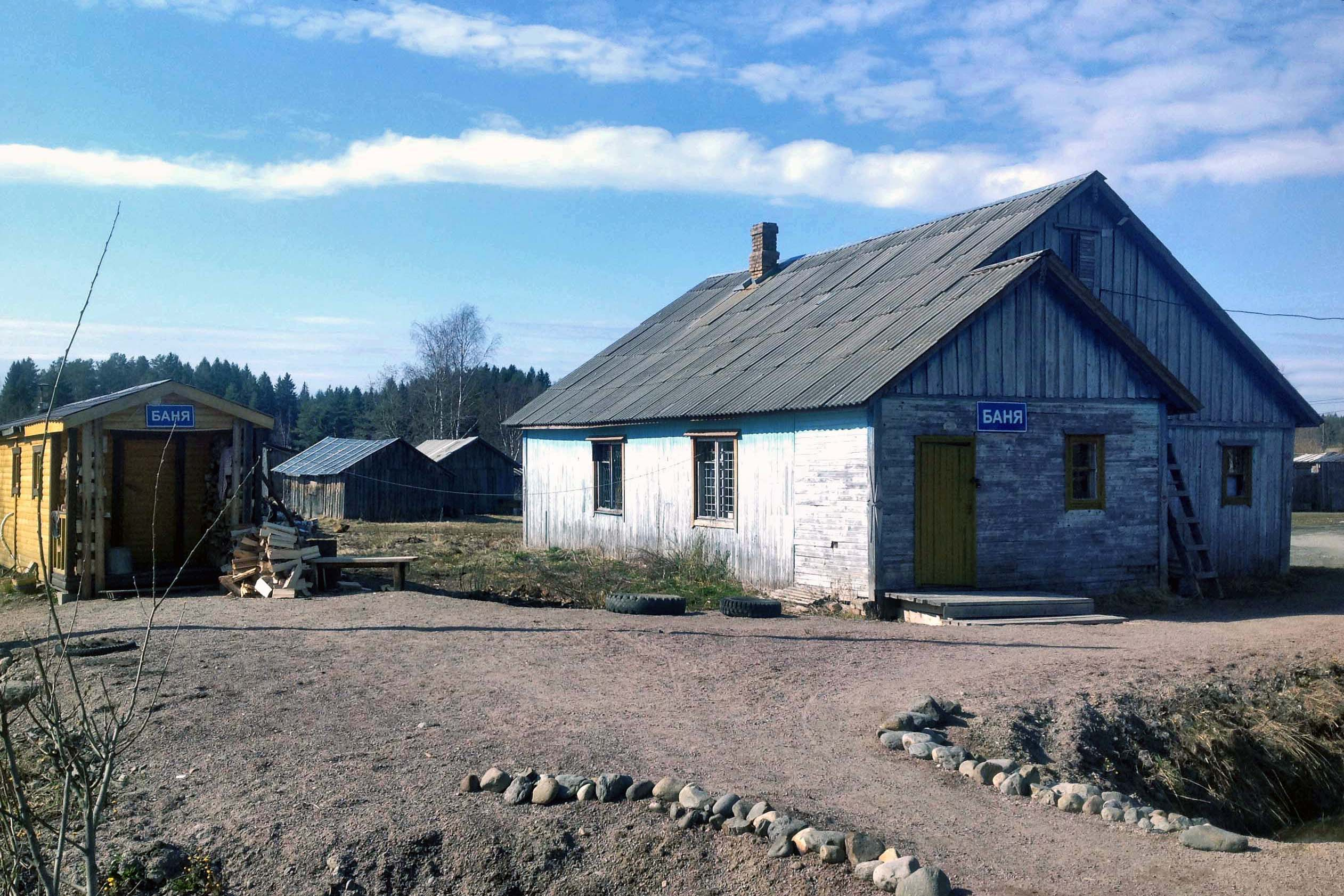
Harlu Public Bathhouse. 2019

The village has a school, a kindergarten, a clinic, a club, a public bathhouse, a post office, a Sberbank branch, a bakery, a pharmacy, several shops, a fire station, and a library.

=== Notable objects and places ===
The ruined buildings of the Läppekoski plant are considered a monument of industrial culture..

== Education ==
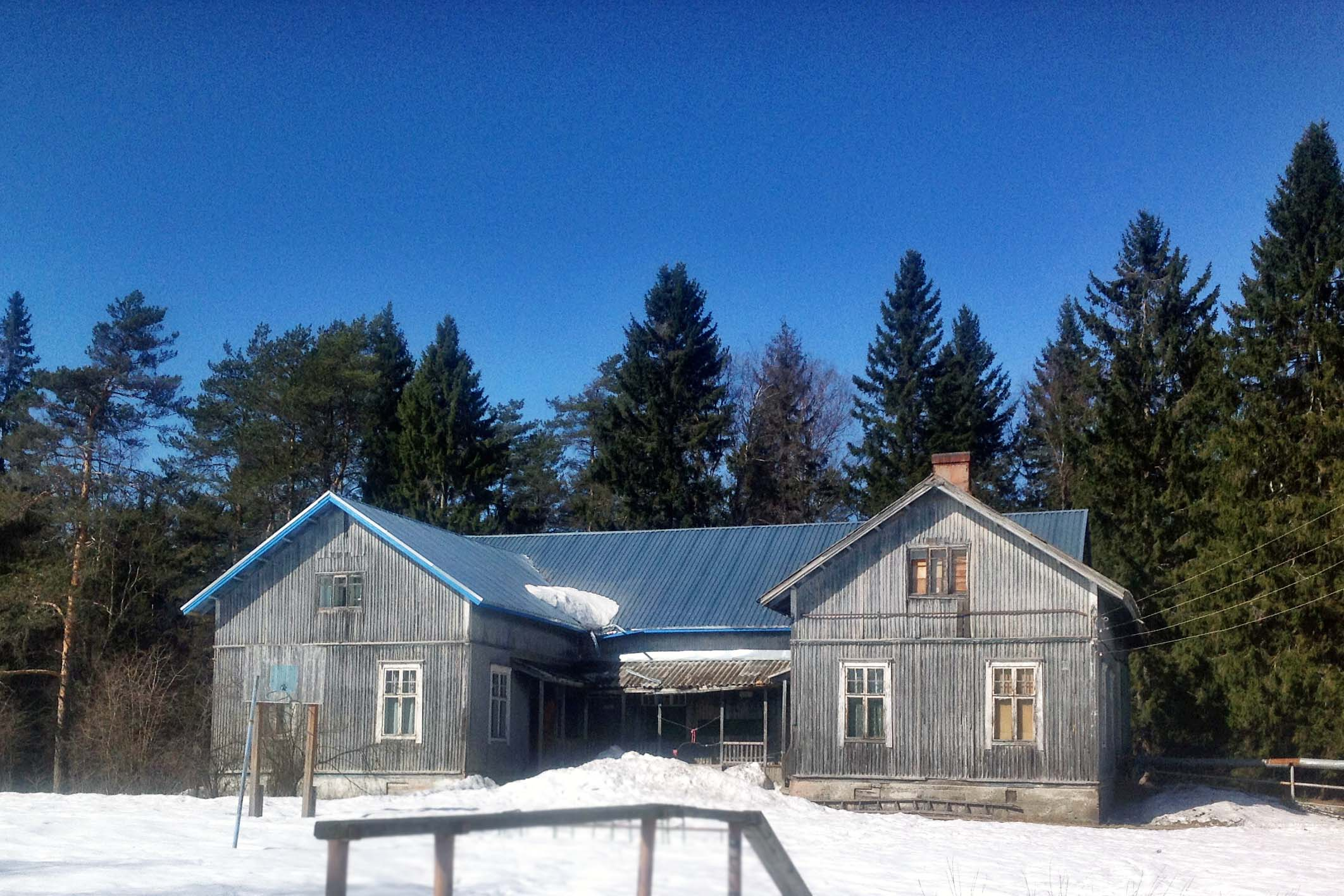
Harlu Library and Gymnasium (Old School), 2019.

In Kharlu, there is a municipal kindergarten called No. 18 "Belochka." A library is also located in it. As of November 4, 2023, the number of students was 49 people.
