= Kuikka =

Kuikka may refer to:

== People ==
- Natalia Kuikka (born 1995), Finnish footballer
- Alli Vaittinen-Kuikka (1918–2006), Finnish nurse and politician

== Places ==
- Kuikka, Jyväskylä, village and district of Jyväskylä, Finland
