= Aikuiset ja lapset kasvatuksen pyörteissä =

Aikuiset ja lapset kasvatuksen pyörteissä is a Finnish play. It was written by Aleksanteri Ahola-Valo in 1914.
