= Vartija =

Finnish theological magazine

- Categories: Theological magazine
- Frequency: Quarterly
- Founder: Elis Bergroth; Karl August Hildén; Aleksander Auvinen
- Founded: 1888
- Final issue: 2017 (print)
- Country: Finland
- Based in: Helsinki
- Language: Finnish
- ISSN: 0782-033X
- OCLC: 499490082

Vartija (Finnish: Guardian) is a quarterly theological magazine based in Helsinki, Finland. It was a print publication between 1888 and 2017 and became an online-only periodical in 2017. The magazine is not attached to any church in Finland and supports both conservatism and radicalism since its establishment.

== History and profile ==
Vartija was founded in 1888 by a group of young priests who had left the Finnish Lutheran Church, including Elis Bergroth, Karl August Hildén and Aleksander Auvinen. The founding editor was Elis Bergroth who served in the post from 1888 to 1906, and he was succeeded by Lauri Ingman. One of the topics covered in the magazine between 1888 and 1910 was the Finnish-American ecclesiastical conditions.

In 1907 Vartija published many articles about the relationship between early Christianity and communism and socialism. In 1911 and 1913 Antti J. Pulkkinen and Aukusti Oravala published articles in the magazine on the work by Danish philosopher and theologian Søren Kierkegaard. Antti Filemon Puukko, a scholar of Old Testament Exegetics, harshly criticized the 1910 book, Hedendom och Kristendom (Swedish: Paganism and Christianity), by Rafael Karsten in the magazine in 1912 arguing that it devalued the meaning and significance of the Bible.

During World War II Vartija became a church discussion forum and also, featured articles on family issues and the welfare state. Psychiatrist Martti Siirala and his theologist brother Aarne Siirala were among the frequent contributors of the magazine in the 1950s. In 1965 Vicar Mauno Mäkinen published an article in the magazine suggesting that Finnish Christians should read the work by Richard W. Solberg.

Irja Askola was the first female editor-in-chief of Vartija who appointed to the post in 1982 along with Simo Knuuttila. As of 2018 the editors-in-chief were Matti Myllykoski and Mikko Ketola. The magazine publishes articles on a wide variety of topics such as religion, theology, philosophy, psychology, culture and society.
