= Holladay Park =

Public park in Portland, Oregon, U.S.

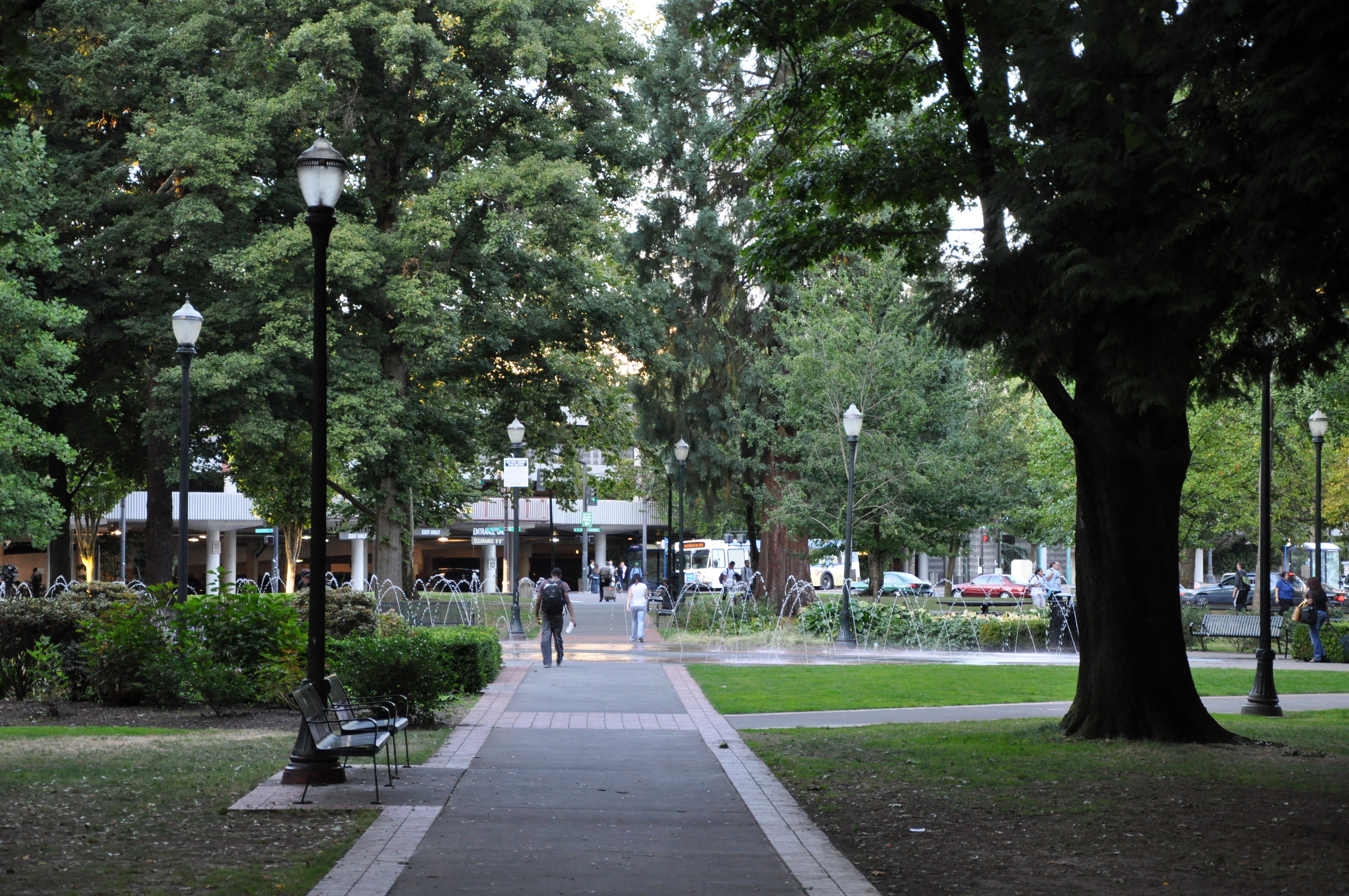
- The park in 2010
- Interactive map of Holladay Park
- Location: NE 11th Ave. and Holladay St. Portland, Oregon
- Coordinates: 45.5308°N 122.6536°W
- Area: 4.54 acres (1.84 ha)
- Operator: Portland Parks & Recreation
- Public transit: Lloyd Center/NE 11th 8, 70

Holladay Park is a public park in northeast Portland, Oregon, United States. The 4.34-acre park, located at Northeast 11th Avenue and Holladay Street, was acquired in 1870. Its features include a fountain, paved paths, picnic tables, and public art.

== Sculpture ==
The park includes Constellation, an art installation by Tad Savinar with three sculptural elements: Flowers from a Neighborhood Garden (also subtitled Vase of Flowers), Isolated Molecule for a Good Neighborhood (sometimes abridged as Molecule), and Neighborhood Gardiner.
