= Constellation (sculpture series) =

Series of bronze sculptures by Tad Savinar in Portland, Oregon, U.S.

- Artist: Tad Savinar
- Year: 2000
- Type: Sculpture
- Medium: Bronze
- Location: Portland, Oregon, United States; 45.5308°N 122.6536°W
- Owner: City of Portland and Multnomah County Public Art Collection courtesy of the Regional Arts & Culture Council

Constellation is a series of outdoor 2000 bronze sculptures by American artist Tad Savinar, installed at Holladay Park in northeast Portland, Oregon, United States. The work's three "distinct elements" include:

- Constellation (Vase of Flowers) or Constellation: Flowers from a Neighborhood Garden, a slender vase of daisies, hydrangeas and other flowers;
- Constellation (Molecule) or Constellation: Isolated Molecule for a Good Neighborhood, an abstract molecule representing a "good neighborhood"; and
- Constellation: Neighborhood Gardiner or simply Constellation, a female figure carrying gardening shears.
Vase of Flowers

Molecule

Neighborhood Gardiner

According to the Regional Arts & Culture Council, which administers the installation, "This project attempts to illustrate the connection between the personal front yard garden and the civic park/garden." The figure depicts a neighborhood activist (Carolyn Marks Backs or Carolyn Marks-Bax, depending on the source). The decision to visualize backs and the objects depicted in the molecule were chosen by the Sullivan Gulch Neighborhood Association. Objects include a bagel, coffee mug, garden tool, house, milk carton, school, a family, and trees. Constellation was funded by the City of Portland's Percent for Art program. It is part of the City of Portland and Multnomah County Public Art Collection courtesy of the Regional Arts & Culture Council.

== See also ==
- 2000 in art
