= Saima Harmaja =

Finnish poet and writer

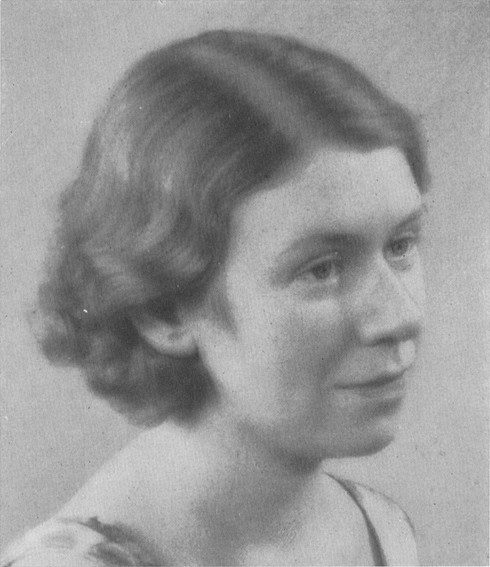
Saima Harmaja

Saima Rauha Maria Harmaja (8 May 1913 in Helsinki – 21 April 1937) was a Finnish poet and writer. She is known for her tragic life and early death, which are reflected in her sensitive poems. She came from a prominent family; her maternal grandfather was Arvid Genetz. She wrote four collections of poetry.

At the age of 15, Harmaja contracted the lung disease tuberculosis. There were good seasons and bad seasons, and in April 1937 she died at the age of 23. She is buried in the Hietaniemi Cemetery in Helsinki. Saima Harmaja kept a diary, which was published posthumously.

A literary club, Saima Harmaja Society, was founded in her memory. Päivi Istala is the Chair as of 2021.

== Bibliography ==
- Huhtikuu. Runoja – via Project Runeberg.
- Sateen jälkeen. Runoja – via Project Runeberg.
- Hunnutettu. Runoja – via Project Runeberg.
- Kaukainen maa. Runoja – via Project Runeberg.
- Elämän auetessa. Koulutytön päiväkirjoja – via Project Runeberg.
