= Mikko Piitulainen =

Finnish politician

Mikko Piitulainen (14 April 1878 in Impilahti – 18 October 1935) was a Finnish farmer, attorney and politician. He was a member of the Parliament of Finland from 1919 to 1922 and again from 1924 to 1927, representing the Agrarian League.
