= Maysionvara (air base) =

Airport in Suojarvi, Russia

- IATA: none; ICAO: none

Summary
- Airport type: Military
- Operator: Russian Air Force
- Location: Suojarvi
- Elevation AMSL: 663 ft / 202 m
- Coordinates: 62°16′48″N 032°25′0″E

Map
- Location of airport in Russia Northwestern Federal District

Runways
| Direction | Length | | Surface |
| Direction | ft | m | Surface |
|---|---|---|---|
| | 7,218 | 2,200 |

Maysionvara is a former Russian air base 22 km north of Suojarvi. A 1962 US satellite analysis showed a 2560 m (8400 ft) runway with no aircraft on the field.
