= Aleksanteri Ahola-Valo =

Finnish artist, writer and thinker

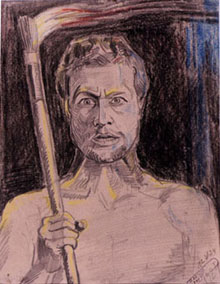
Ahola-Valo's self-portrait

Aleksanteri Ahola-Valo (27 January 1900, in Impilahti, Karelia – 15 September 1997, Simrishamn, Sweden) was a Finnish artist, architect and thinker. Inventor of "AE-evohomology" life philosophy. He was a witness to the Russian Revolution.

"Ahola-Valo has lived through many of the dreams and tragedies of our century: Bloody Sunday in St Petersburg in 1905, the collapse of Czarist Russia and the birth of the Soviet Union, the artistic utopias and avantgardism of the early 20th century, Stalinism, flight from the country,...the dissolution and abolition of the Soviet Union along with the rest of us. Marc Chagall, Sergei Eisenstein, Nadezhda Konstaninovna Krupskaya, Anatoly Lunacharsky, Maxim Gorky and Vladimir Tatlin: all are episodes and encounters in his life story." (Kimmo Sarje: With Aleksanteri Ahola-Valo in the Early Days of the Soviet Union. In: Siksi, 1/1992, p. 11.)

Aleksanteri Ahola, nickname Ali, started to write a Russian diary as a schoolboy in 1907 (part one), translated into Finnish by himself and first published in 1988 (Aleksanteri Ahola-Valo: Koulupojan päiväkirja. Ensimmäinen kouluvuosi. Hämeenlinna: ELPO ry 1988, ISBN 951-99967-0-2). At the age of 14 he wrote a play, Aikuiset ja lapset kasvatuksen pyörteissä (Adults and children in the whirls of education). "Aleksanteri Ahola and his friends had a theatre of their own in early 1910's in the villa community of Vyritsa in Ingermanland, 60 kilometers to the south of St. Petersburg. It was called Four Pine Theatre because it was situated outdoors. There were one hundred seats on benches in the amphitheatre. In the background on the stage there were carpets hanging with paintings attached to them. Ali Ahola painted them himself and they showed local buildings, forest, clouds, whatever needed." (Kai Kyösti Kaukovalta: Näytelmän taustaa ja reunahuomautuksia. In: Aleksanteri Ahola-Valo: Aikuiset ja lapset kasvatuksen pyörteissä. Hämeenlinna: Elpo ry 1997, p. 5-9, translated into English by K. K. Kaukovalta for mrs. L. Sabovljev, member of Elpo ry, 1999.) "He began his art studies at the Pihkova School of Applied Arts under von der Flitt from 1919-21, and continued at the Vitebsk School of Applied Arts and Crafts from 1921-22, and then at the Odessa School of Applied Arts from 1923-24. (...) His first solo exhibition was in Vitebsk in 1922. (Kimmo Sarje: With Aleksanteri Ahola-Valo in the Early Days of the Soviet Union. In: Siksi, Helsinki: 1/1992, p. 15.) Ahola-Valo studied at the Vitebsk Art and Graphic Studios in Belarus (1921–1922), and at the Odessa Art Institute in Ukraine (1923–1925).

In 1925 he took part in the Battleship Potemkin silent film. In 1930 he designed "The temple of violence of mankind" in Minsk, Belarus. Kimmo Sarje: "He left the Soviet Union for Finland in 1933, but his work was hindered by damaging political prejudice. Nevertheless, while in Finland he took part in many exhibitions, and even started his own business, Ahola-Valon taidetuotanto (Ahola-Valo art production)." In 1939–1940 Ahola-Valo was imprisoned for political reasons in the Tammisaari prison camp in Finland. He was one of the last surviving cast members of Battleship Potemkin, if not the last. "In 1946 he moved to Sweden to study the history of the Vikings. This study trip was to last over three decades. Ahola-Valo lived both in the suburbs of Stockholm and in southern Sweden. He held many exhibitions there, and did illustrations for the Sunday edition of Stockholms Tidningen.(...) Ahola-Valo returned to Finland in 1982... He has works in the Ateneum in Helsinki, in the Belorussian Picture Gallery in Minsk, in the Kiev Art Gallery, in the Pushkin Fine Arts Museum in Moscow, and in Malmö Art Museum." (Kimmo Sarje)
