= Arvid Genetz =

Finnish politician, poet and linguist

Arvid Oskar Gustaf Genetz
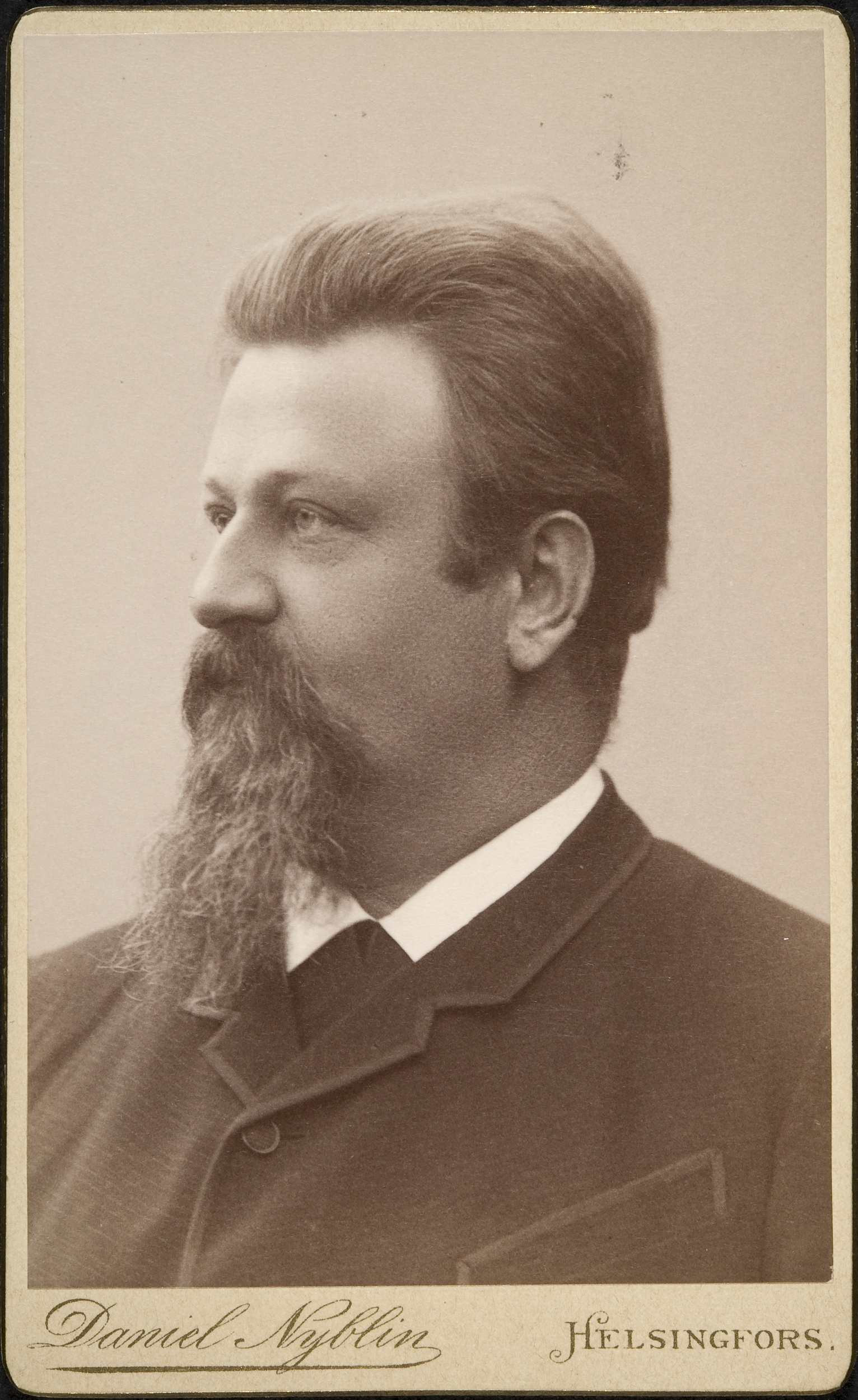
- Early 1890s.
- Born: 1 July 1848; Impilahti, Viipuri Province, Grand Duchy of Finland
- Died: 3 May 1915 (aged 66); Helsinki, Finland
- Education: University of Helsinki
- Children: Sons Juho, Arvi, Niilo and Paavo; Daughters Laura and Helvi

Arvid Oskar Gustaf Genetz (1 July 1848— 3 May 1915) was a Finnish politician, poet and linguist. He wrote under the pseudonym Arvi Jännes. His best known poems are "Herää Suomi", "Karjala" and "Väinölän lapset". He was a member of the Senate of Finland from 1901 to 1905.

== Background ==
He was born in Impilahti, Finland. His parents were Carl Johan Garbriel Genetz and Laura Charlotta Ferrin. His brother was the Finnish composer Emil Genetz (1852–1930).

Genetz was married in 1877 with Julia Eva Maria Arppe (1851–1931). He and his wife had six children: sons Juho, Arvi, Niilo and Paavo, and daughters Laura and Helvi. Poet and author Saima Harmaja (1913–1937) was his granddaughter.

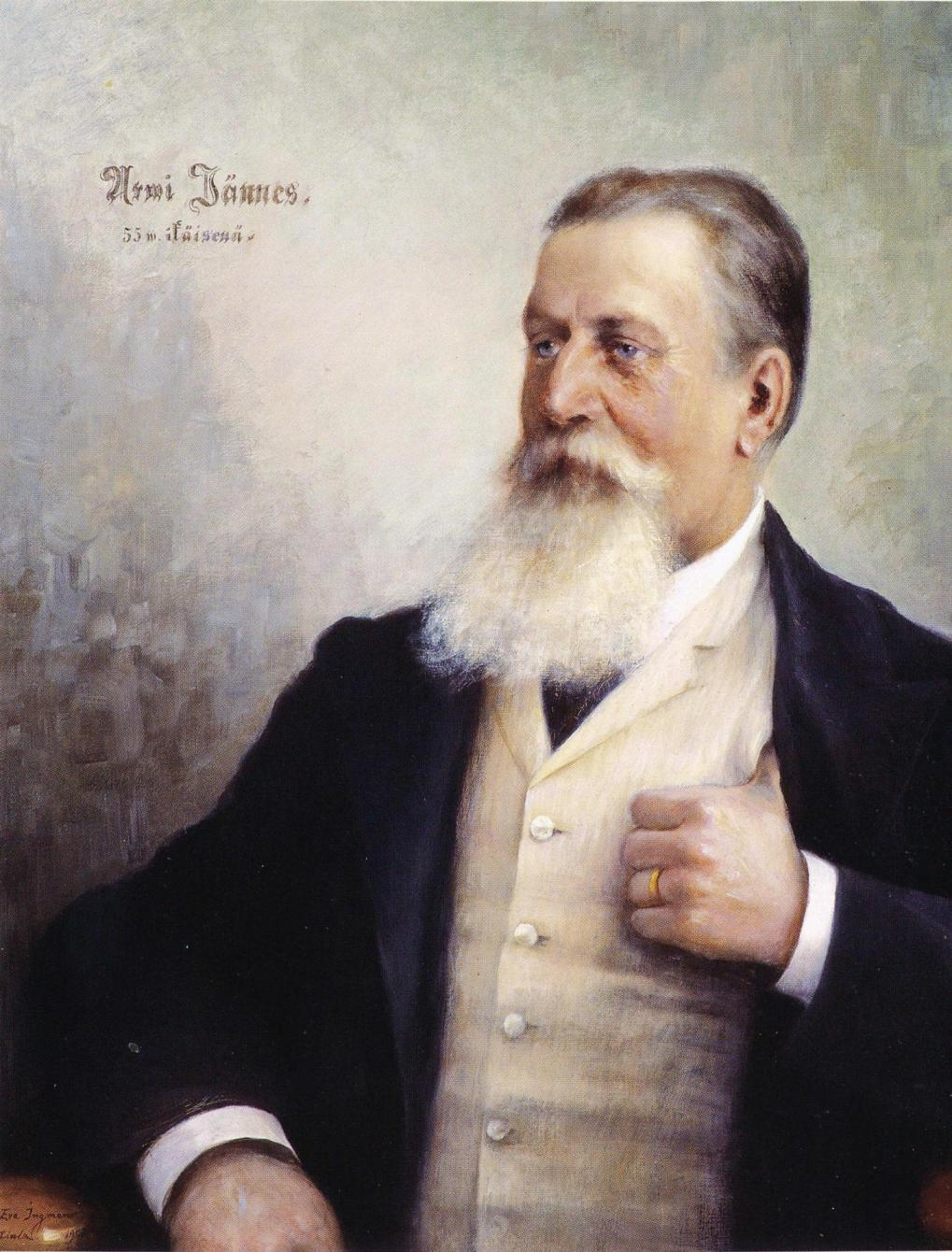
Arwi Jännes, portrait by Eva Ingman (1903)

== Career ==
Genetz graduated from the gymnasium in 1866, graduated from the Imperial Alexander University (now University of Helsinki) as a candidate doctor in 1871 and received his doctorate in 1877. He initially worked as a Finnish and Swedish teacher at the Lyceum in Hämeenlinna, and then served as a lecturer at the University of Helsinki in the School of Finnish language and literature, in 1877. Genetz served under Professor August Ahlqvist (1826–1889) and was elected to the chair held by Professor Ahlqvist after the death of the Finnish language and literature professor in 1891. Genetz competed for this position was his colleague Eemil Nestor Setälä (1864–1935). A year later the position was split in two: Finnish language and literature and Finno-Ugric studies. The latter was the specialty of Genetz, and Setälä became the professor of Finnish language and literature. Genetz worked as a professor until 1901. He died in 1915 in Helsinki.

Genetz has been considered a pioneer of modern morphology, as he described the Sami morphological variations in a modern way, using principles later employed in generative linguistics to understand both the deep and surface structure of the language, separating the description of the models. In historical linguistics, he was the first one who realized that the Sami exchanged many loans words with the Baltic Finnic languages. In order to research Finno-Ugric languages, Genetz made several expeditions to the White Sea region of Karelia, the Kola Peninsula and Siberia.

Arvid Genetz worked with native speakers to translate the Gospel of Matthew into Kola Sámi. In 1878 the British and Foreign Bible Society published this translation in Cyrillic orthography. Chapters 1–22 were translated in Kildin Sámi language and chapters 23–28 were in Akkala Sámi language.

== Poetry ==
- Muistoja ja toiveita ystäville jouluksi (Weilin & Göös 1889)
- Muutamia Arvi Jänneksen runoja (Kansanvalistus-seura 1892)
- Toukokuun-lauluja (KS 1897)
