= Aleksander Auvinen =

Finnish Lutheran Priest and Politician (1857-1918)

Aleksander Auvinen (23 December 1857, in Impilahti – 29 August 1918) was a Finnish Lutheran priest and politician. He studied theology at the University of Helsinki and was ordained a priest of the Evangelical Lutheran Church of Finland in 1881. He was one of the founders of Vartija magazine which was started in 1888. Auvinen was the vicar of Impilahti from 1898 to 1906 and the vicar of Savonlinna-Sääminki from 1906 to 1918. He was politically active as a Member of the Diet of Finland.
