= Hans Moller (painter) =

German-American painter (1905–2000)

- Born: March 5, 1905; Wuppertal, Germany
- Died: October 19, 2000 (aged 95); Allentown, Pennsylvania, U.S.
- Education: Berlin University of the Arts
- Known for: Painting
- Movement: Abstract art
- Spouse: Helen Rosenblum (m. 1933)

Hans Moller (born March 5, 1905 – October 19, 2000) was a German-born American artist who worked mostly in an abstract format and is primarily considered to have been a colorist.

== Early life and education ==
Moller was born on March 5, 1905, in Wuppertal, Germany.

From 1919 until 1927, Moller was an instructor at the Kunstgewerbeschule Wuppertal-Barmen, an arts and crafts learning institution in the town in which he resided and worked as a bricklayer. He studied at the Academy of Fine Arts in Berlin.

== Career ==
In 1936, he emigrated to the United States from Germany to protect his Jewish wife, Helen Rosenblum who he married in 1933, from the Nazis. Once settled in the U.S. he went to work for the advertising firm Lord and Thomas as a graphic designer. His works from Lord and Thomas were exhibited at MOMA as part of a group exhibition in 1949.

The first solo exhibition of his paintings was held in 1942 at the Bonestell Gallery in New York City. Over the following two decades, he had some twenty five solo exhibitions at various galleries. Moller created paintings in a multiplicity of styles, including expressionism, abstractionism, surrealism, cubism, pointillism, and fauvism. He was later represented for a stretch ending in 1995 by the Midtown-Payson Gallery in New York City. In 1995, the Dusseldorf gallerist Torsten Bröhan put together an exhibition of Moller's work; it was the first solo exhibition of Moller's work in Germany.

Moller was known foremost as a colorist, once saying, "I only want to wake up every day and decide what colors to paint my sky."

Ad Reinhardt included Moller in his 1946 work "How to Look at Modern Art in America".

== Personal life ==
Moller and his wife Helen were long time residents of Allentown, Pennsylvania.

== Death ==
Moller died on October 19, 2000, in Allentown, Pennsylvania. His wife predeceased him in 1997.

== Legacy ==
Following Moller's death a retrospective of the painter's work was mounted at the Lore Degenstein Gallery at Susquehanna University with an accompanying catalogue published by the Penn State University Press. The exhibition then traveled around Pennsylvania from 2001 until 2002 and then to the Portland Art Museum in Portland, Maine. Moller's works are held in the collections of the Museum of Modern Art, the Whitney Museum of American Art, the Brooklyn Museum of Art, the Hirshhorn Museum and Sculpture Garden, and the Allentown Art Museum.
