= Ensio Koivunen =

Finnish serial killer

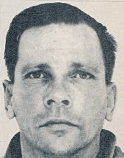
- Born: Ensio Kalevi Koivunen; 23 June 1930; Impilahti, Finland
- Died: 27 May 2003 (aged 72); Varkaus, Finland
- Other name: "Häkä-Enska"
- Conviction: Murder
- Penalty: 25 years prison sentence

Details
- Victims: 3
- Span of crimes: July – August 1971
- Country: Finland
- Date apprehended: September 1971

Ensio Kalevi Koivunen (23 June 1930 – 27 May 2003) was a Finnish serial killer who poisoned three female hitchhikers using carbon monoxide in the summer of 1971, and thereby got the nickname Häkä-Enska ("Carbon monoxide-Enska").

== The missing girls ==
On 11 July 1971, 23-year-old Salme Helena Metsänikula (born 28 January 1948) disembarked a bus in Anjala en route from Helsinki to Turku. She was last seen in Koria before she vanished. A friend began worrying about Metsänikula when she failed to return to university. Her father travelled to Turku to look for her, but when no trace of her was found, she was declared missing. On 17 August, 17-year-old Ritva Anneli Raijas (born 27 November 1953) and 16-year-old Pirjo Marjatta Laiho (born 20 July 1954) left Pitäjänmäki to visit an aunt in Hyvinkää. When they did not arrive a few days later, they were also declared as missing. Their last known location was at the Hämeenlinna bridge near Keimola on 14 August.

A 28-year-old Helsinki auto mechanic was seen taking the girls from the bridge. His actions were reported during the 1971 European Athletics Championships in Helsinki, as having picked up the girls near an Esso station on the crossroad between Kaarela and Nurmijärvi. The man reportedly had met the girls at 21:51 and had been seen with them at the Esso station until 22:00, when he left without them. Other motorists had seen the girls later on between Helsinki and Hämeenlinna. According to these accounts, they had been seen in a red Citroën 2CV.

== Discovery of the bodies ==
On 18 August a Helsinki family, picking mushrooms in a forest in Ingå, stumbled upon a body wrapped up in plastic wrap and covered with moss and lark. Next to it were neatly fitted eyeglasses and patent leather shoes. The police later notified the National Bureau of Investigation (NBI), which started exploring the forest and the surrounding environment. It was determined that the cause of death was unnatural. Later, the victim's identity was confirmed as Metsänikula. Her camera, three rings and belt were missing. Metsänikula's body was found near a labour camp in Ingå, where criminals were placed to work for the last stages of their sentences before release. The police screened the prisoners' fingerprints in case the killer was there.

On 20 August police were called in to inspect lost goods at Seutula's old airport. They found a young woman's personal belongings, including a Kela card and an audio recorder. The goods were found to belong to Raijas and Laiho. The following day, a group of young men found the bodies of the remaining two girls covered with plastic wrap in Ridasjärvi village.

== Investigation and capture ==
The plastic was important evidence since it had a serial number that was assumed to belong to the Citroën the girls were last seen riding in. Since the plastic was made in Sweden, five Swedish companies were contacted about the matter. However, it was eventually determined that the plastic had probably come through Finland with some electrical equipment and was not linked to any Swedish-registered automobile. The victims' shoes were tied neatly in lines, and at the time of the autopsy were in a smiling position. Ethanol was later found in their blood, and both had been sexually assaulted. The cause of death was determined as carbon monoxide poisoning.

The NBI combined the investigation of the cases, as the girls' killings were very similar and close in proximity. All the victims had been abducted and their bodies found in the Southern Finland Province. The NBI, for the first time in its history, received pictures of the victims, which were distributed from all around Southern Finland to filling stations and dance venues. On one of the photographs, there were fingerprints of a man who had been to the Ingå labor camp. His car, a 1967 Dodge Dart, registration number BNL-99, was searched. According to anonymous tips, the Dodge had been seen several times at the locations of the abductions.

On 26 September the police found and arrested the Dodge's owner, 41-year-old Ensio Kalevi Koivunen, in the town of Hanko. His car and his home were searched. Two illegal pistols, a woman's belt and a camera were found.

== Interrogations ==
Koivunen repeatedly changed his story under questioning. He denied killing the girls or even meeting them. However, he had transported four women in the summer, denying they were the same girls. In one of the interviews, Koivunen admitted to having met Metsänikula at the shore of Myllylampi, and that they talked about her studies and personal life over coffee. He also noted that Metsänikula used a lot of medication. As they continued their journey, the girl suffered a respiratory attack, causing Koivunen to stop and flee from the car. After returning, he found Metsänikula lying dead in the car's back seat. He later hid the girl's body in the Ingå forest.

Similarly, Koivunen denied knowing anything about Laiho and Raijas, but changed his story and claimed to have met Laiho earlier and began a relationship with her. According to him, Laiho proposed a meeting and brought along Raijas, whereupon the three headed for Hyvinkää. While they drank at a nightclub, an unnamed younger man joined them and Raijas began vomiting. Koivunen claimed that the girls were murdered outside of his presence and that the unnamed man had admitted to battering them to death. Koivunen's wife was also interviewed, and told police that Koivunen came home on the night of 15 August and told her that he had shown two girls and a boy around the city. When he and his wife read the magazine about the disappearance of Laiho and Raijas, Koivunen noted that they looked the same as the girls he had been with.

Koivunen's story soon changed again, removing the unnamed young man from his story. This time he claimed that the girls had fallen asleep on the back seat while he was driving. Upon awakening, Koivunen noticed that the engine was running, and tried to wake the girls, unsuccessfully.

Shuddering, Koivunen wandered around hoping the girls would wake up, but they were dead. In fear, he remembered what had happened to Metsänikula one month earlier. Koivunen feared to get sent back to jail and decided to get rid of the bodies. When the police asked how they had died, Koivunen told them that while they slept, someone had dug up the hose from the car's back and connected it through the exhaust pipe to the back of the car. However, the question arose of how Koivunen survived that.

Koivunen never acknowledged his guilt and changed the details of the story many times, remaining consistent about a few details. According to his wife, the girls were scared, and had vomited and choked while in the car. When they heard that the police had found tire marks on the fringes, Koivunen's wife remembered her husband's strange and nervous behaviour on that night.

During the investigation, a hair of Koivunen was found on Laiho and Raijas' bodies. The camera found at home was also identified as his, as well as fingerprints from a photo found in a back alley near his home.

There were plenty of anonymous tips, some of which were significant. During a preliminary investigation, a girl told the police that she had hitchhiked from Helsinki to Hyvinkää. The driver was a 41-year-old male. At first, everything seemed innocent until the man had decided to introduce the girl to the city. He had taken her, among other places, to the Taabor mountain, speaking about himself and his life on the way. When they got there, he did not let the girl out and threatened her, but she jumped out of the car and fled. After the incident, she had seen that same man near her house several times. When she was shown a picture of Koivunen, she immediately recognized him.

== Trial ==
Koivunen was arrested for the murder of Metsänikula, Raijas and Laiho. He was jailed in the Helsinki Prison before the trial in the Hyvinkää District Court, which got a lot of publicity. Koivunen was initially dissatisfied with his lawyer, and changed him before the trial. He tried to change his story and bring his own witnesses to the court, but nothing helped. The trial lasted six hours each day.

Koivunen's criminal record was very long. He had been convicted of several property crimes, and from 1953 to 1968 he had been free only for a short time, and been incarcerated in a prison hospital eight times. He served a six-year sentence in jail when he was involved in a car crash. All the crimes he had committed were done in Hyvinkää and Ingå, because they were located near the prison camp. Koivunen was ordered for a mental health examination.

Koivunen was found to be sane, but in the process was identified as a habitual liar.

The Hyvinkää District Court ruled that Koivunen was guilty on all three charges of assault, false imprisonment and negligent homicide, and sentenced him to 25 years in prison. Mauno Koivisto pardoned Koivunen in the fall of 1981. Koivunen died on 27 May 2003.

== See also ==
- List of serial killers by country
