= Päivi Istala =

Finnish journalist

Päivi Kaarina Istala
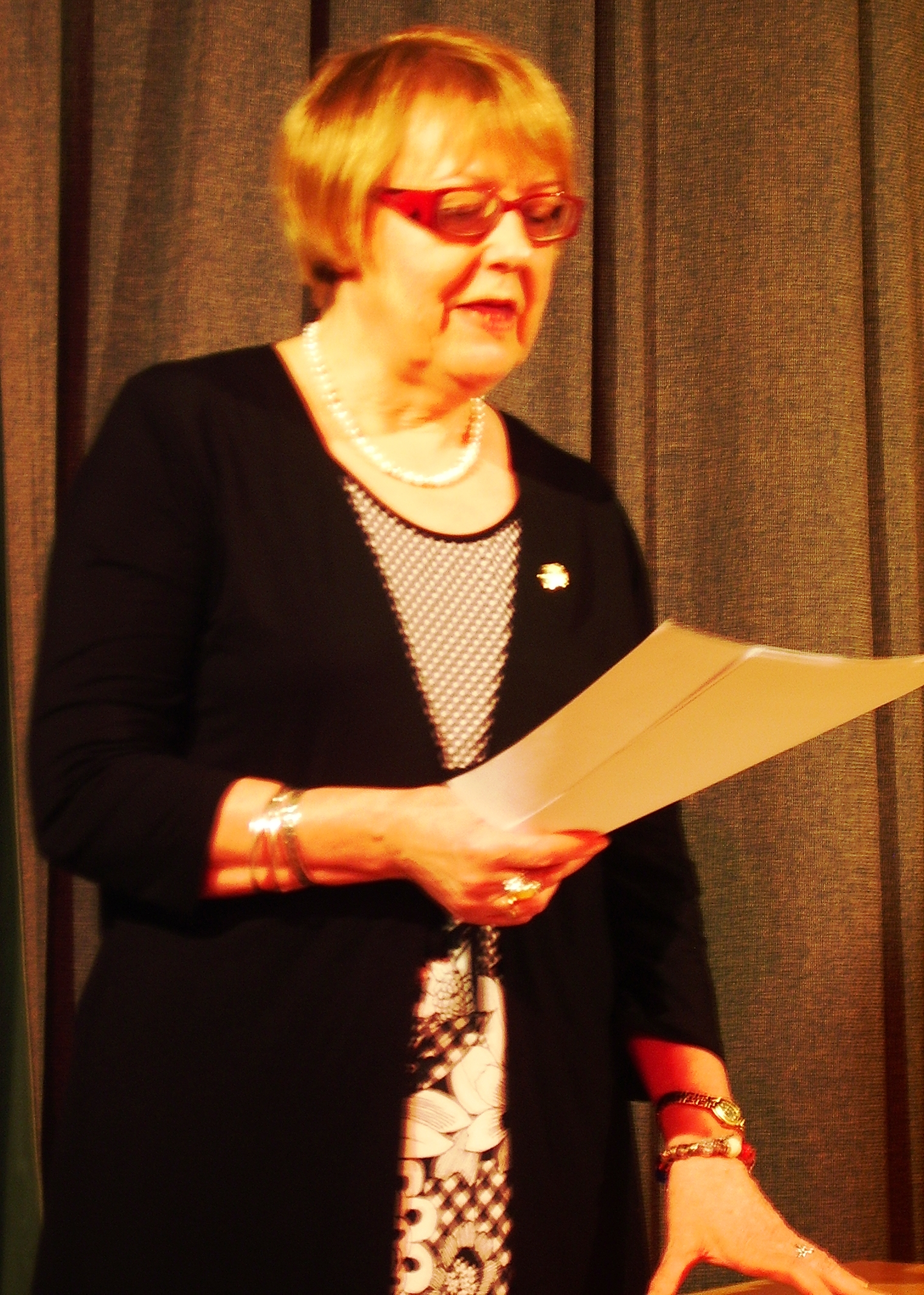
- Born: Päivi Istala; March 31, 1947; Imatra, Finland
- Occupations: Journalist, Theater Director

Päivi Istala (born 31 March 1947 in Imatra ) is a Finnish journalist. She worked as a radio journalist for the Finnish Broadcasting Company YLE from 1967 to 2011. She graduated with a degree in playwrighting from the Helsinki Theatre Academy in 1971 and served as the city theater director in Kemi from 1975 to 1981. She has been awarded, among other things, the Finland State Award for Public Information, the Hella Award, and the Cross of Merit of the Order of the White Rose of Finland. Ms. Istala retired at the end of January 2011, and published her memoirs Cross Appeal and Other Stories of life. She serves as the Chair of the Saima Harmaja Society, commemorating the Finnish poet.
