= Alli Vaittinen-Kuikka =

Finnish politician and nurse (1918–2006)

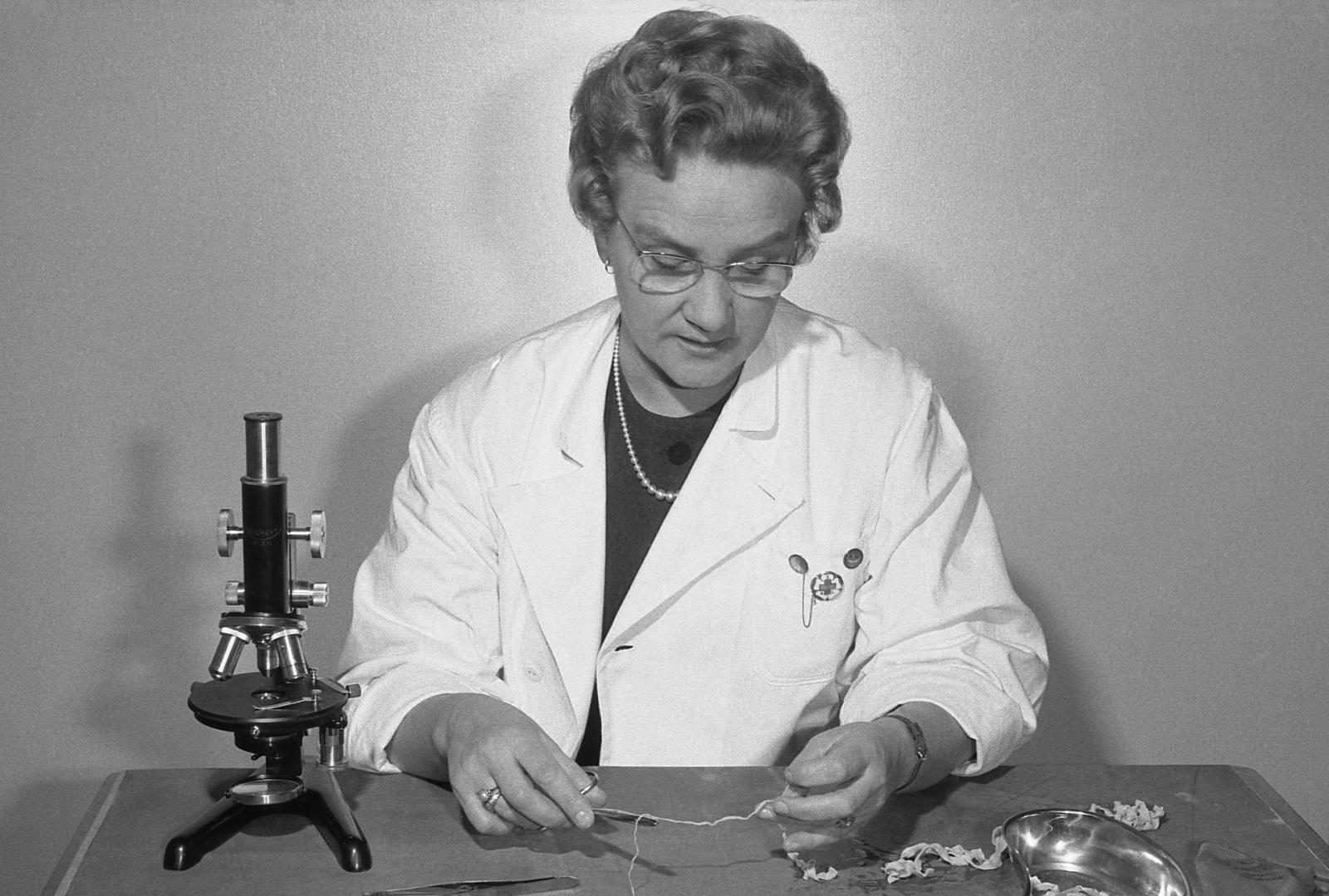

Member of the Parliament
- In office 5 April 1966 – 23 April 1979

Personal details
- Born: Alli Ester Vaittinen-Kuikka; 8 May 1918 Impilahti
- Died: 2006 (aged 87–88) Joensuu, Finland
- Party: National Coalition Party

Alli Vaittinen-Kuikka (1918–2006) was a Finnish nurse, midwife and conservative politician. She was a member of the Parliament between 1966 and 1979 representing the National Coalition Party. She is known for her activities against tapeworm in Finland.

== Biography ==
Vaittinen-Kuikka was born in Impilahti on 8 May 1918. She was trained as a midwife and graduated from the Midwifery College in Helsinki in 1942. She obtained a degree in nursing from the Nursing College in 1947.

She served as the director of the preparatory school of the Midwifery College in the 1940s. She was the founder of the Nokia Communicable Disease Hospital and worked as a head nurse. In the 1950s she worked as the district health nurse of the Finnish Red Cross and started her activities in Joensuu to eradicate the tapeworm. She continued these activities as a scientific assistant at the pharmaceutical company Medica in the 1960s.

On 5 April 1966, Vaittinen-Kuikka was elected as a deputy for the National Coalition Party from the North Karelia constituency and served in the Parliament until 23 April 1979. During her term she advocated the limitation on the pornographic publications, but her proposals were not accepted by the Parliament. She also disapproved of the state-sponsored institutional day care of children citing its negative effects on mental health.

After retiring from politics she continued to deal with scientific studies. She died in 2006 in Joensuu at the age of 88. She donated her inheritance to the city council of Joensuu.
