= Emil Genetz =

Finnish composer (1852–1930)

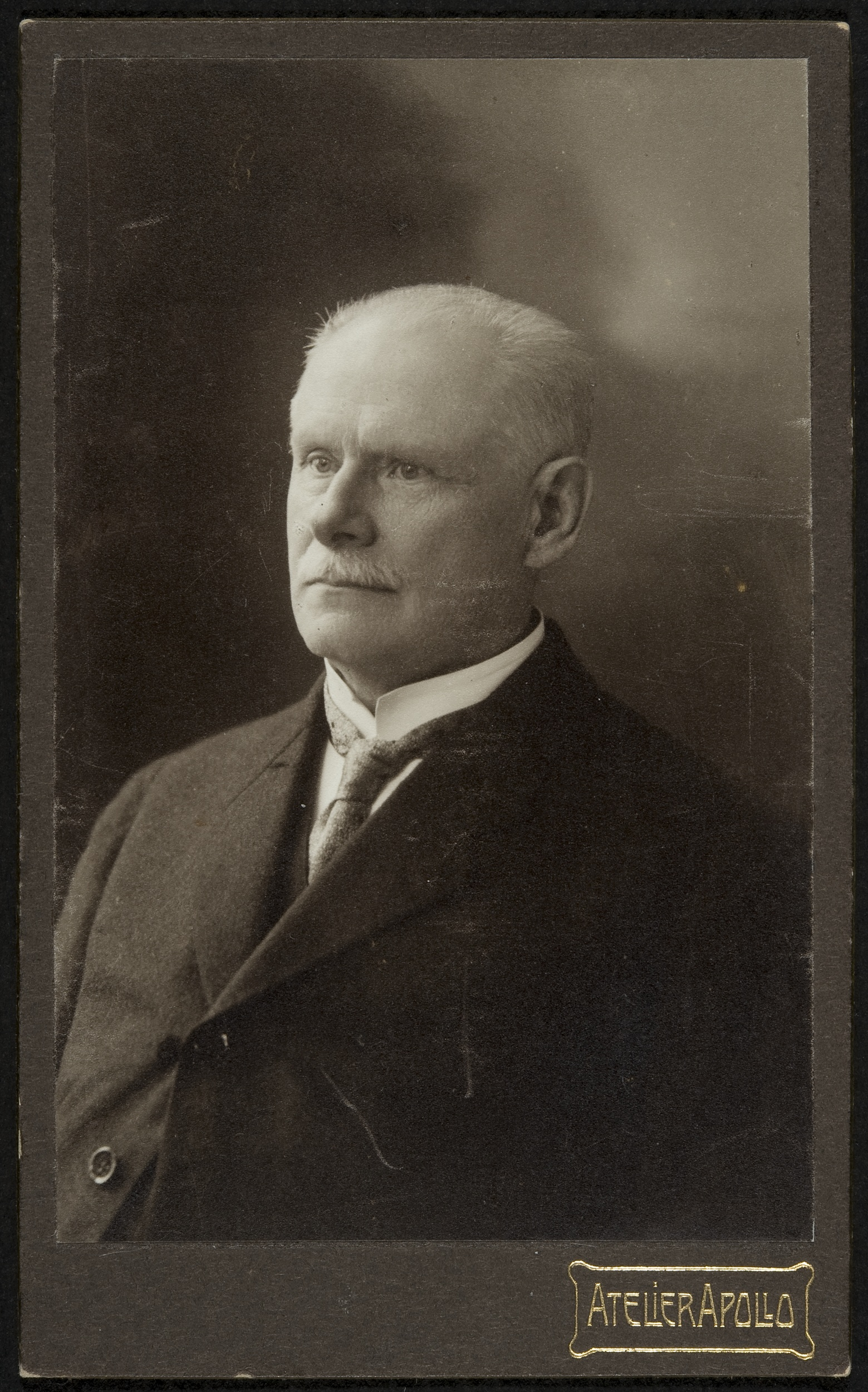
Emil Genetz

Karl Emil Moritz Genetz (October 24, 1852 – May 1, 1930) was a Finnish composer of patriotic choral works.

Genetz was born in Impilahti, Grand Duchy of Finland, Russian Empire (now in the Republic of Karelia). He became professionally employed as a language teacher, but gained prominence for his choral compositions. After studying chemistry and law at the University of Helsinki, he became a singer in the Finnish Opera, and traveled on a state grant to study at the Dresden Conservatory from 1875 to 1877. He spent time in various cities of Finland, including Hämeenlinna, Helsinki, and Hamina, working as a German language teacher, composing patriotic works, and conducting choirs. He died in Helsinki in 1930. Many of his works are still well known in modern Finland.

James Fuld in his The Book of World-Famous Music points out that the first two measures of Genetz' Herää Suomi! (Arise Finland!) for male chorus, published in 1882, are almost identical with the main tune of Jean Sibelius' Finlandia of 1900, during which time the Grand Duchy of Finland was part of the Russian Empire, which makes one consider how blatantly revolutionary against the Czarist regime Sibelius' wordless orchestral piece was.
