= Pitkyaranta =

Town in the Republic of Karelia, Russia

Pitkyaranta Питкяранта Pitkyrandu (Karelian)
- Town
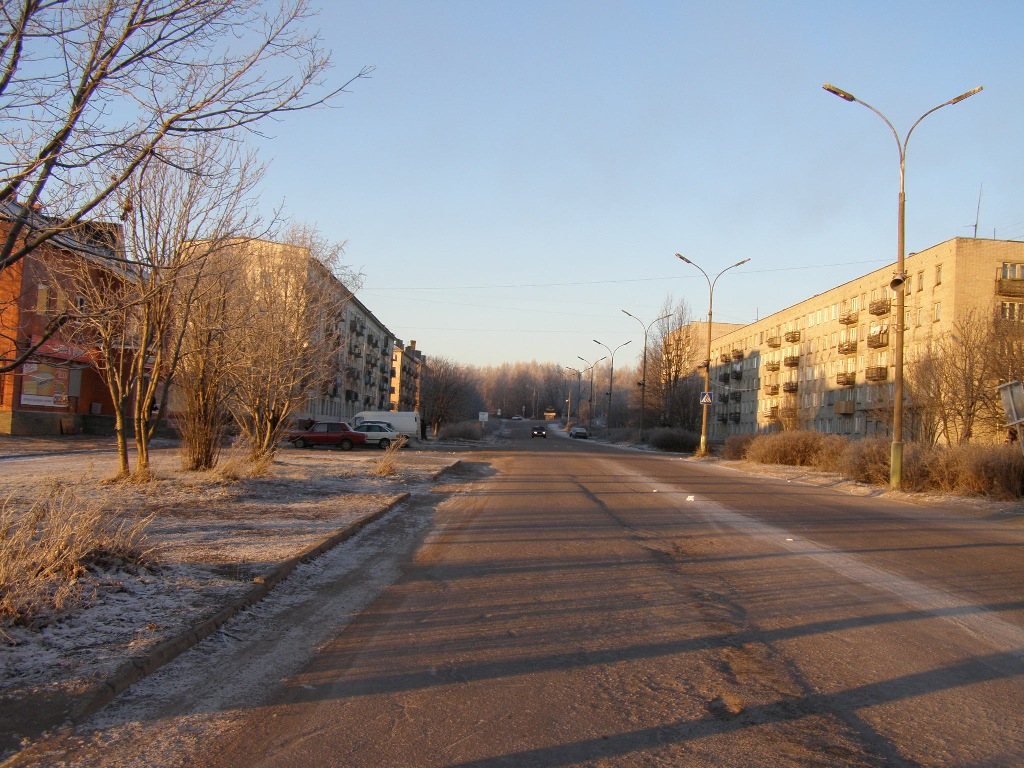
- A street in Pitkyaranta

- Flag Coat of arms
- Interactive map of Pitkyaranta
- Location of Pitkyaranta Pitkyaranta (Karelia)
- Coordinates: 61°34′30″N 31°28′40″E
- Country: Russia
- Federal subject: Republic of Karelia
- Administrative district: Pitkyarantsky District
- Founded: 19th century
- Town status since: July 9, 1940

Population (2010 Census)
  - Total: 11,429
  - Estimate (2023): 8,094 (−29.2%)

Administrative status
  - Capital of: Pitkyarantsky District

Municipal status
  - Municipal district: Pitkyarantsky Municipal District
  - Urban settlement: Pitkyarantskoye Urban Settlement
  - Capital of: Pitkyarantsky Municipal District, Pitkyarantskoye Urban Settlement
- Time zone: UTC+3 (UTC+03:00)
- Postal code: 186810
- Dialing code: +7 81433
- OKTMO ID: 86633101001

Pitkyaranta (Russian: Питкяранта; Livvi: Pitkyrandu; Finnish: Pitkäranta) is a town and the administrative center of Pitkyarantsky District of the Republic of Karelia, Russia, located on the northeastern coast of Lake Ladoga. Population: 11,429 (2010 census); 13,347 (2002 census); 14,361 (1989 Soviet census).

== History ==
Originally a part of Finland, Pitkäranta was part of the municipality of Impilahti. Pitkäranta was the largest settlement center in Impilahti, with about 2,000 inhabitants in the late 1930s. Pitkäranta was also the center of Salmi Parish. The Pitkäranta Orthodox parish comprised the eastern part of Impilahti municipality and the Uuksu area of Salmi. Pitkäranta also formed a prayer room under the Impilahti Lutheran Congregation. There was also a secondary school in Pitkäranta.

Pitkäranta was, above all, a major industrial location. The most important industries were the mining and forestry industries. Mining in Pitkäranta began as early as the 18th century and its heyday was in the 19th century. The Pitkäranta mines produced, among other things, iron and silver. Mining was at a standstill in the early 20th century, but a resumption was planned. Pitkäranta also had sawmills, a red soil factory and a glass factory started in 1889, whose main products were bottles. Diesen Wood Oy's sawmill began operations on Pusunsaari in 1920 and a sulphite pulp mill in 1921. A plot of land was planned in Pitkäranta, but war and regional handovers prevented the plan from being implemented.

Pitkäranta was ceded to the Soviet Union in the peace of Moscow in 1940. In the Soviet Union, it became a city on July 9, 1940. In the Continuation War, Finland recaptured Pitkäranta in 1941, but had to cede it again in 1944. Most of Pitkäranta's buildings were destroyed during the wars.

== Administrative and municipal status ==
Within the framework of administrative divisions, Pitkyaranta serves as the administrative center of Pitkyarantsky District, to which it is directly subordinated. As a municipal division, the town of Pitkyaranta, together with three rural localities, is incorporated within Pitkyarantsky Municipal District as Pitkyarantskoye Urban Settlement.

== Economy ==
By the Decree of the Government of the Russian Federation dated July 29, 2014 No. 1398-r «On approval of the list of single-industry towns», the city is included in the category of «Single-industry municipalities of the Russian Federation (single-industry towns) with the most difficult socio-economic situation».

The «Pitkyaranta» Pulp Mill is located in the city. In the economy of the city, the leading place was occupied by the timber and mining complex.

There is a railway station in the city. Passenger transportation services were discontinued in 2015. In 2021, traffic was resumed: in winter, several flights of the experimental Moscow—Pitkyaranta train took place, then the only passenger train at the station was a daily commuter train on the route from Karelian Sortavala to Lodeynoye Pole, Leningrad Oblast.

== International relations ==
=== Twin towns and sister cities ===
Pitkyaranta is twinned with:

- Kuopio, Finland
- Pikalyovo, Russia
