= Salmi (rural locality) =

Salmi Салми
- Settlement
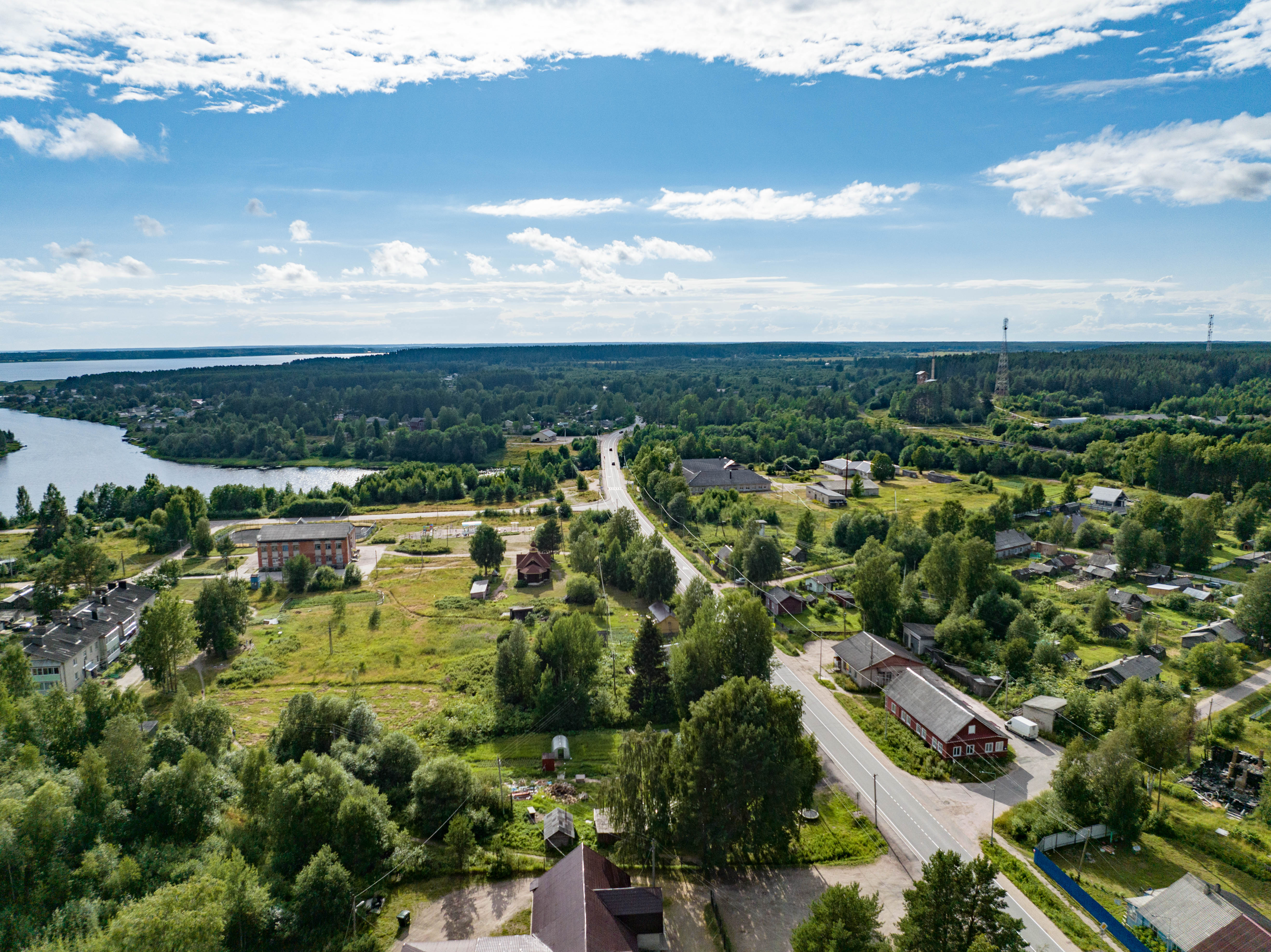
- Aerial view on the street of the Svir Divisions
- Interactive map of Salmi
- Location of Salmi Salmi (Karelia)
- Coordinates: 61°22′07″N 31°52′00″E
- Country: Russia
- Federal subject: Republic of Karelia
- Administrative district: Pitkyarantsky District

Population (2010 Census)
  - Total: 2,207
  - Estimate (2013): 2,187 (−0.9%)

Municipal status
  - Municipal district: Pitkyarantsky Municipal District
  - Capital of: Salminskoye Rural Settlement
- Time zone: UTC+3 (UTC+03:00)
- Postal code: 186821
- OKTMO ID: 86633420101

Salmi (Russian: Салми; Finnish and Karelian: Salmi, lit. inlet) is a rural locality (a settlement) in Pitkyarantsky District of the Republic of Karelia, Russia. Municipally, it is incorporated within and serves as the administrative center of Salminskoye Rural Settlement of Pitkyarantsky Municipal District.

== History ==
The first mention of the Solomenskiy Orthodox pogost in this place dates back to 1500. It was part of the Korelsky district of the Vodskaya Pyatina. Before the capture of these territories by the Swedes in the early 17th century — the Solomians. "Voskresenskaya Solomyanskaya pogost" with borders from modern Uuksu to the Border Guard on the shore of Ladoga and to Suoyarvi in the north.

Since 1617, as part of the Swedish Kingdom, from this period there has been a mass exodus of the local Karelian population to the territory of modern Tver and Vologda regions. In 1632, the Swedes of Salmi presented the rights of the city.

Under the terms of the Nishtadt Peace Treaty in 1721, the lands were returned to the Russian Empire.

At the beginning of the XX century, a steam sawmill, a ceramic factory and tanneries operated in the villages of Miynala, Tulema and a village on the island of Lunkulansaari.

From 1918 to 1939, it was part of Finland. With 90% of the population speaking Karelian as their mother tongue, Salmi used to be one of the most distinctly Karelian municipalities in the country.

In the 1935-1970s, the Salma Salmon Hatchery operated.

From 1940 to 1991, it had the status of an urban-type settlement, and a large sovkhoz «Salmi» operated.

== Attractions ==
- Grave of 1100 Soviet soldiers who died during the Soviet-Finnish War (1941-1944) and the grave of Hero of the Soviet Union T. I. Parshutkin. In 1959, a granite obelisk and a sculptural group were installed on the mass grave.
- Church of St. Nicholas the Wonderworker was built in 1826 (now in a dilapidated state).

== Sister cities ==
Salmi is twinned with:

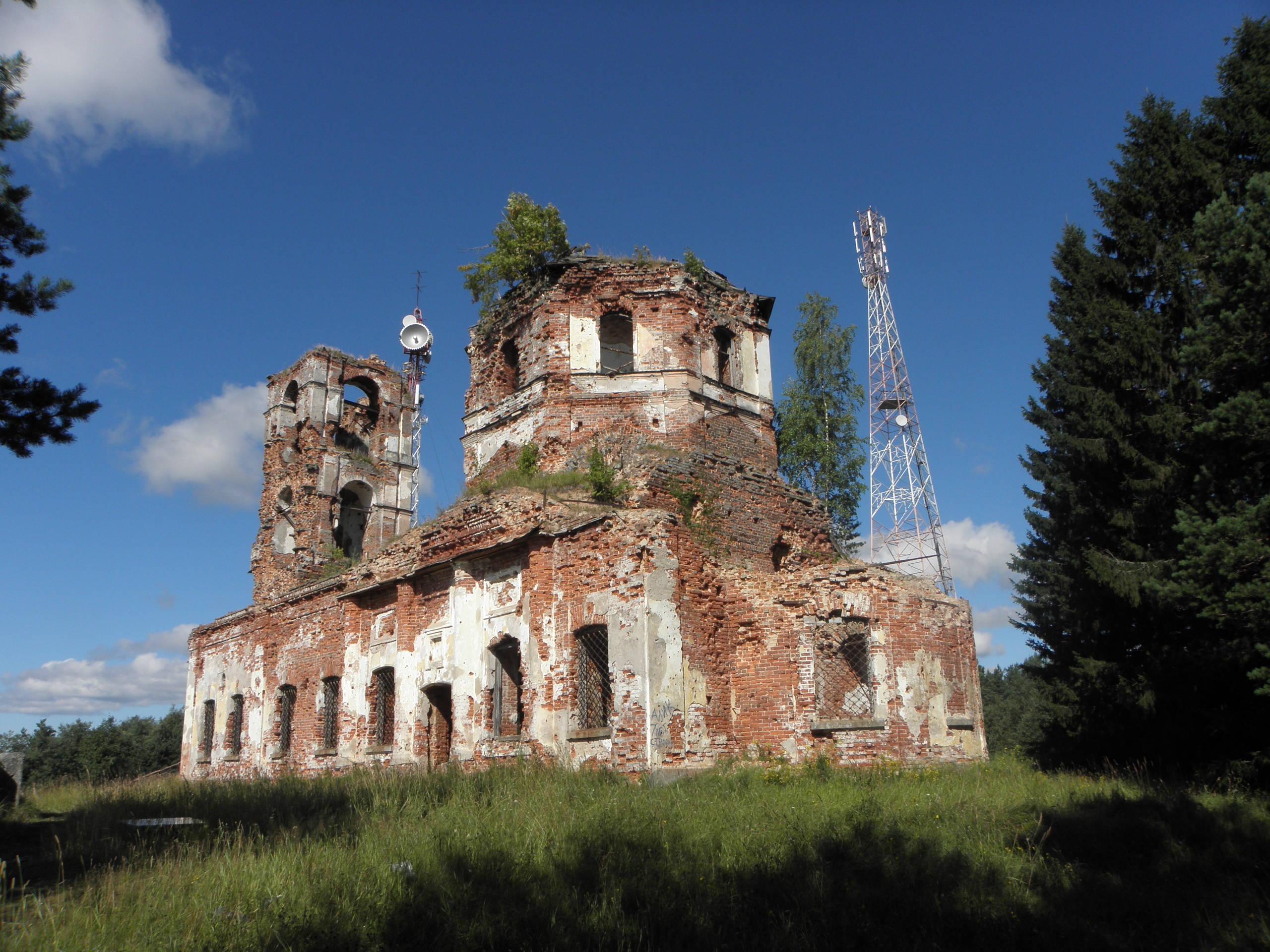
- Ruins of Nikolskaya church in Salmi
  Pielavesi (Finland)

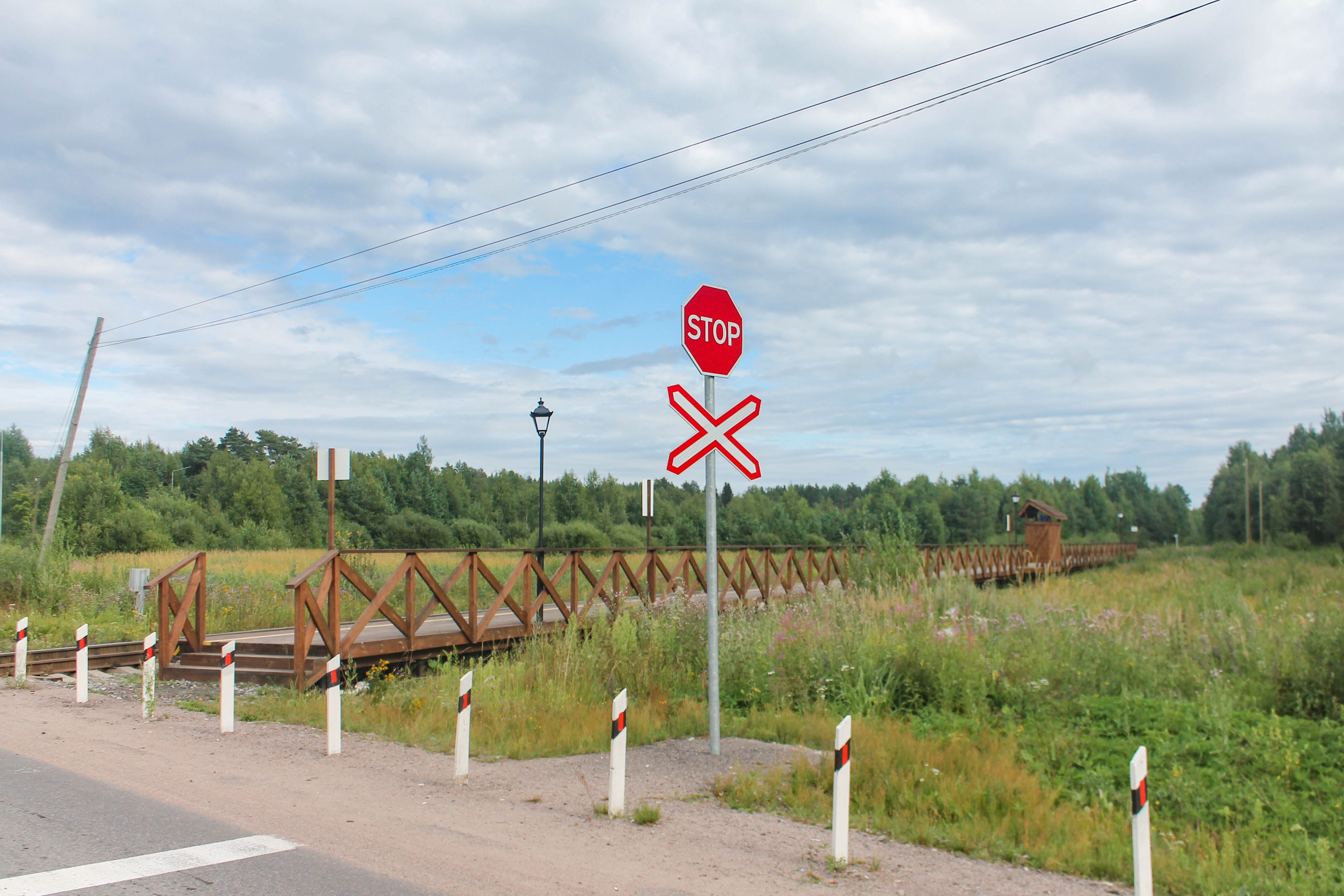
Salmi-2 railway halt
