= Leo Lankinen =

Russian sculptor

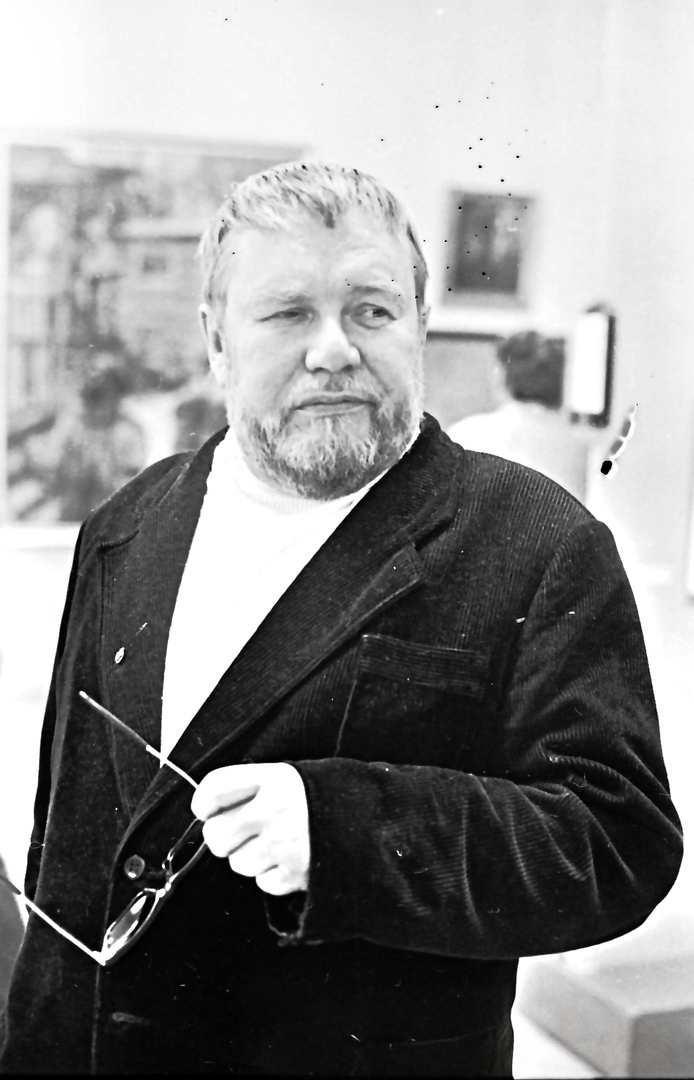
Leo Lankinen

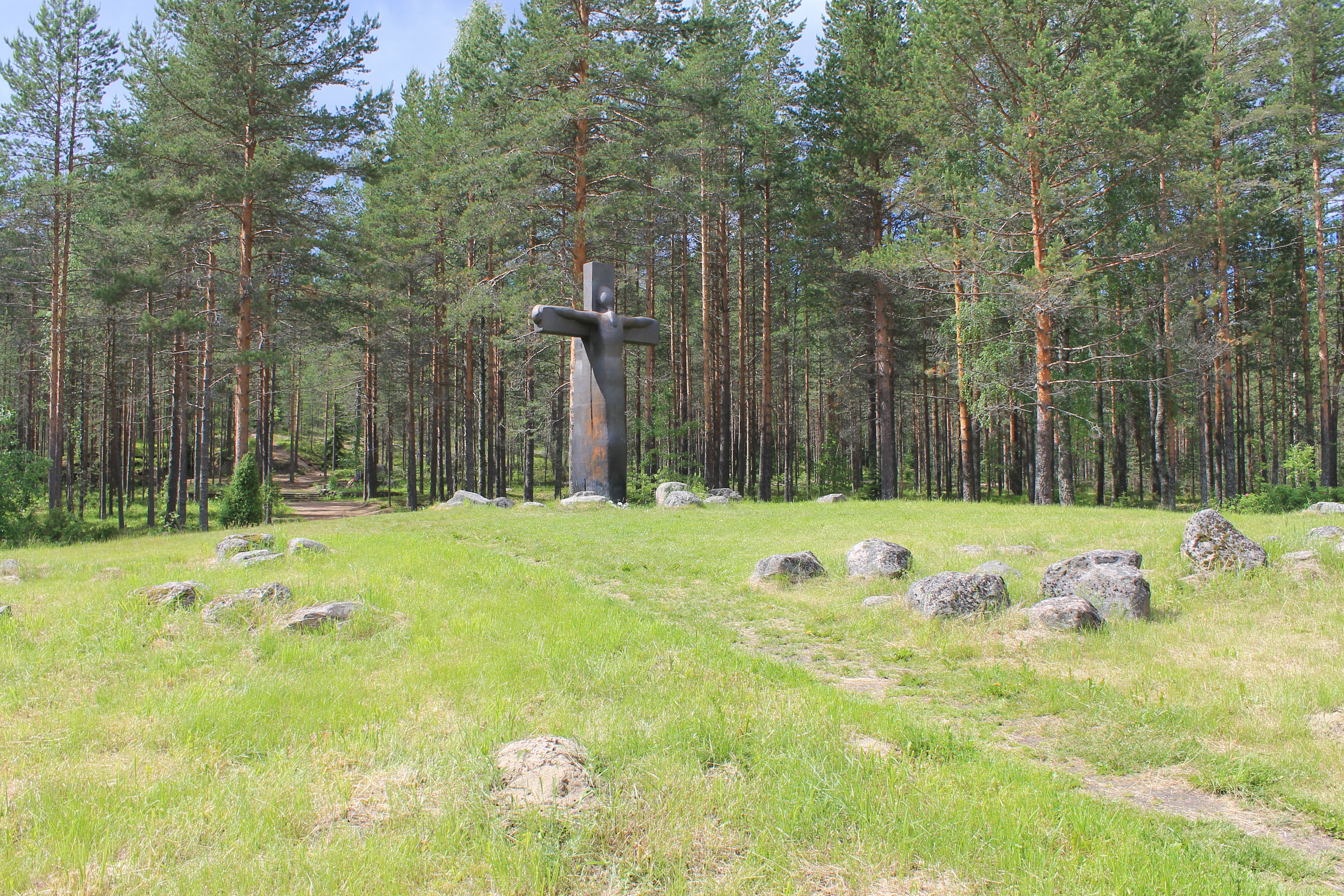
Cross of Sorrow

Leo Lankinen (Langinen) (Russian: Лео Фомич Ла́нкинен, Leo Fomich Lankinen) (13 July 1926 – 17 December 1996) was a Karelian sculptor and painter.

His last work was the Cross of Sorrow, a memorial dedicated to Soviet and Finnish soldiers perished in the Winter War of 1939-1940.

== Awards and recognition ==
- 2006: Karelian State Prize in Arts (posthumously)
- Ilya Repin State Prize
- 1986: Full member of the USSR Academy of Arts
- 1968: People's Artist of RSFSR
- 1967: Gold Medal of the USSR Academy of Arts, for the cycle "Мой современник" of portraits (<Сиркка>, <Спортсмен Миша Попов>, <Комсомолка 30-х годов>, <Помор>, <Тойво Антикайнен>)
- 1959: Meritorious Artist of RSFSR

The house in Petrozavodsk where he lived during 1960-1996 ( №16, ул. Куйбышева) bears a memorial plaque dedicated to him.

In 2003 a collection Скульптор Лео Ланкинен was published, of memoirs of Zurab Tsereteli, Tair Salakhov, philologist Eino Karhu, sculptor Boris Plenkin, and others about the sculptor.
