= Suoyarvi =

Town in the Republic of Karelia, Russia

Suoyarvi Суоярви Suojärvi (Karelian/Finnish)
- Town

Other transcription(s)
  - Karelian/Finnish: Suojärvi
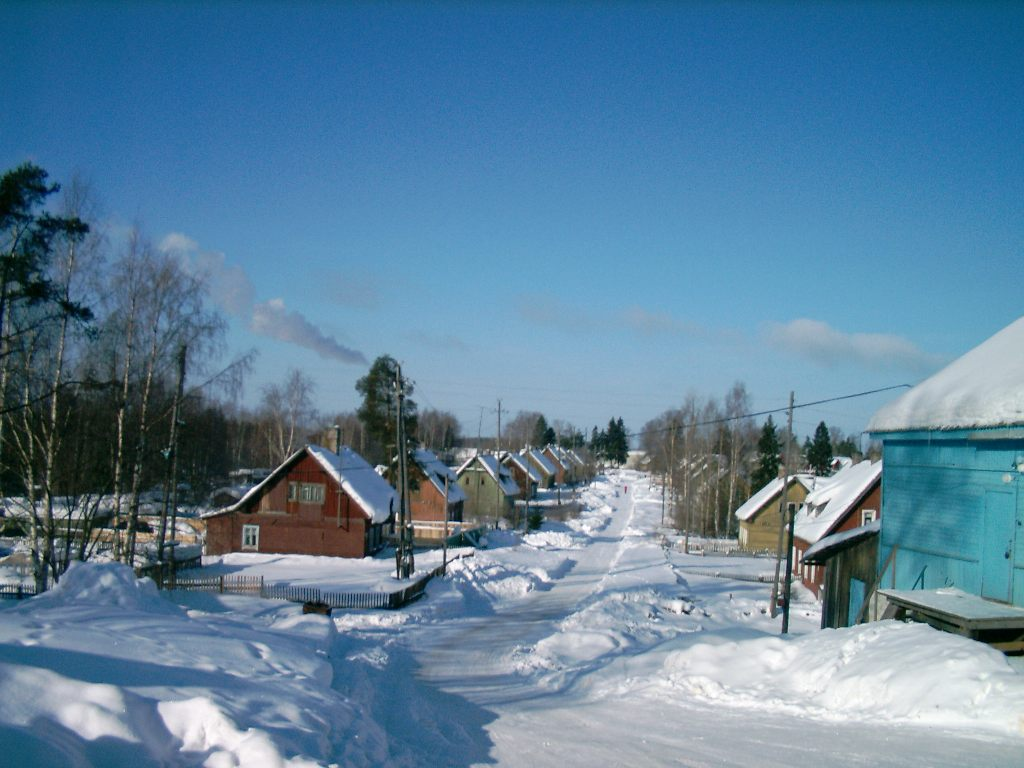
- A street in Suoyarvi

- Flag Coat of arms
- Interactive map of Suoyarvi
- Location of Suoyarvi Suoyarvi (Karelia)
- Coordinates: 62°05′N 32°21′E
- Country: Russia
- Federal subject: Republic of Karelia
- Administrative district: Suoyarvsky District
- First mentioned: 1589
- Town status since: 1940

Population (2010 Census)
  - Total: 9,766
  - Estimate (2023): 6,819 (−30.2%)

Administrative status
  - Capital of: Suoyarvsky District

Municipal status
  - Municipal district: Suoyarvsky Municipal District
  - Urban settlement: Suoyarvskoye Urban Settlement
  - Capital of: Suoyarvsky Municipal District, Suoyarvskoye Urban Settlement
- Time zone: UTC+3 (UTC+03:00)
- Postal codes: 186870, 186872
- OKTMO ID: 86650101001
- Website: suojarvi-gp.ucoz.ru

Suoyarvi (Russian: Суоя́рви; Karelian: Suojärvi; Finnish: Suojärvi) is a town and the administrative center of Suoyarvsky District of the Republic of Karelia, Russia, located 140 kilometers (87 mi) northwest of Petrozavodsk. Population: 9,766 (2010 census); 11,600 (2002 census); 11,772 (1989 Soviet census).

== History ==
Historical affiliations

- Tsardom of Russia 1589–1617
- Kingdom of Sweden 1617–1721
- Russian Empire 1721–1812
- Grand Duchy of Finland (Russian Empire) 1812–1917
- Republic of Finland 1917–1940
- Soviet Union 1940–1941
- Republic of Finland 1941–1944
- Soviet Union 1944–1991
- Russian Federation 1991–present

It is known that during the 16th and 17th centuries a settlement existed here known as Shuyezersky pogost (a Russian form of the local Karelian name, meaning "swampy lake"). The first documented mention dates from 1589 when Suoyarvi is recorded as church community controlled by the Orthodox community of Sortavala. In 1630, Suoyarvi became an independent community.

An outcome of the Winter War was that most of West Karelia was occupied by the Soviet Union in 1940, when Suoyarvi was granted town status. In August 1941, the territory was re-occupied by Finnish troops, but as part of the wider post-war settlement, it reverted to the Soviets in 1944; it was the second largest territory by area (after Petsamo) ceded by Finland to the Soviet Union following the Continuation War. Before the occupation, Suoyarvi was geographically the easternmost municipality of Finland.

Suoyarvi had its own dialects of the Karelian language before the area was ceded to the Soviet Union and its inhabitants were relocated to other parts of Finland. Most of the Karelian people in the former municipality spoke a variety of South Karelian (suvikarjala), while the villages in the Hyrsylä (Khyursyulya) salient, which also included Ignoila (Ignoyla) and Hautavaara (Khautavaara), spoke a Livvi dialect instead.

== Administrative and municipal status ==
Within the framework of administrative divisions, Suoyarvi serves as the administrative center of Suoyarvsky District, to which it is directly subordinated. As a municipal division, the town of Suoyarvi is incorporated within Suoyarvsky Municipal District as Suoyarvskoye Urban Settlement.

== Transportation ==
The town serves as a railway junction along the railway line linking Helsinki with St. Petersburg and Petrozavodsk. From Suoyarvi, a line branches off to Yushkozero and Kostomuksha. In the Cold War it was the nearest town to the Maysionvara airbase.

== Sister city ==
- Joensuu, Finland
