= Pitkyarantsky District =

Pitkyarantsky District Питкярантский район (Russian)
- District
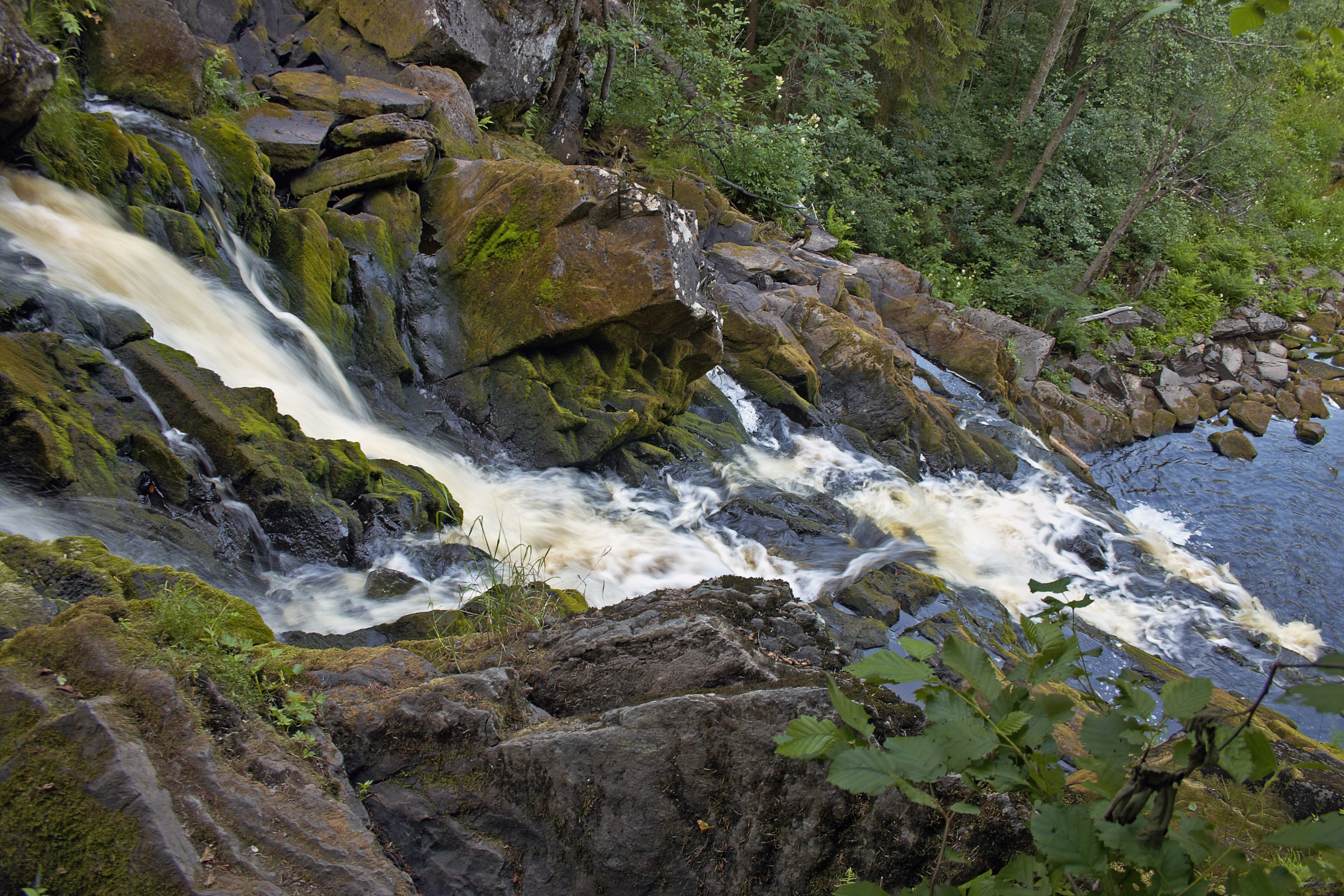
- Belye Mosty Waterfall, a protected area of Russia in Pitkyarantsky District

- Flag Coat of arms
- Location of Pitkyarantsky District in the Republic of Karelia
- Coordinates: 61°34′N 31°29′E
- Country: Russia
- Federal subject: Republic of Karelia
- Established: 9 July 1940
- Administrative center: Pitkyaranta

Area
  - Total: 2,300 km^{2} (890 sq mi)

Population (2010 Census)
  - Total: 19,895
  - Density: 8.6/km^{2} (22/sq mi)
  - Urban: 57.4%
  - Rural: 42.6%

Administrative structure
  - Inhabited localities: 1 cities/towns, 35 rural localities

Municipal structure
  - Municipally incorporated as: Pitkyarantsky Municipal Okrug
- Time zone: UTC+3 (UTC+03:00)
- OKTMO ID: 86633000
- Website: http://admin.pit.su

Population of Pitkyarantsky District
- 2010 Census: 19,895
- 2002 Census: 10,497
- 1989 Census: 27,177
- 1979 Census: 27,154

Pitkyarantsky District (Russian: Питкяра́нтский райо́н; Karelian: Pitkänrannan piiri; Finnish: Pitkärannan piiri) is an administrative district (raion), one of the fifteen in the Republic of Karelia, Russia. It is located in the southwest of the republic. The area of the district is 2,300 square kilometers (890 sq mi). Its administrative center is the town of Pitkyaranta. As of the 2010 census, the total population of the district was 19,895, with the population of Pitkyaranta accounting for 57.4% of the population.

== Administrative and municipal status ==
Within the framework of administrative divisions, Pitkyarantsky District is one of the fifteen in the Republic of Karelia and has administrative jurisdiction over one town (Pitkyaranta) and thirty-five rural localities. As a municipal division, the district is incorporated as Pitkyarantsky Municipal Okrug, covering the territory of the entire district. The municipal okrug was formed in 2023 with the merger of all previous municipalities within the district: the Pitkyaranta urban settlement and the rural settlements of Impilakhti, Kharlu, Lyaskelya and Salmi. The town of Pitkyaranta serves as the administrative center of both the district and municipal okrug.

== Sights ==
The Cross of Sorrow, a memorial to soldiers perished on both sides of the Winter War of 1939–1940, is located in Pitkyarantsky District at the crossroads of Pitkyaranta–Suoyarvi–Petrozavodsk.
