= Kizhskiy Strait =

Strait in Lake Onega, Russia

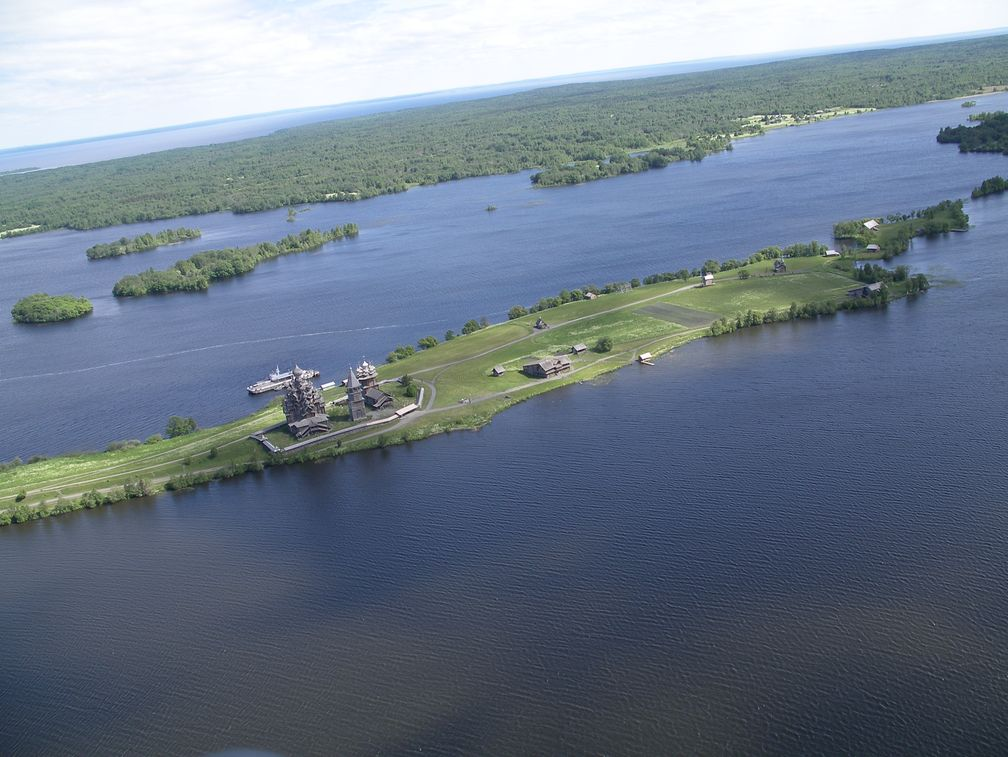

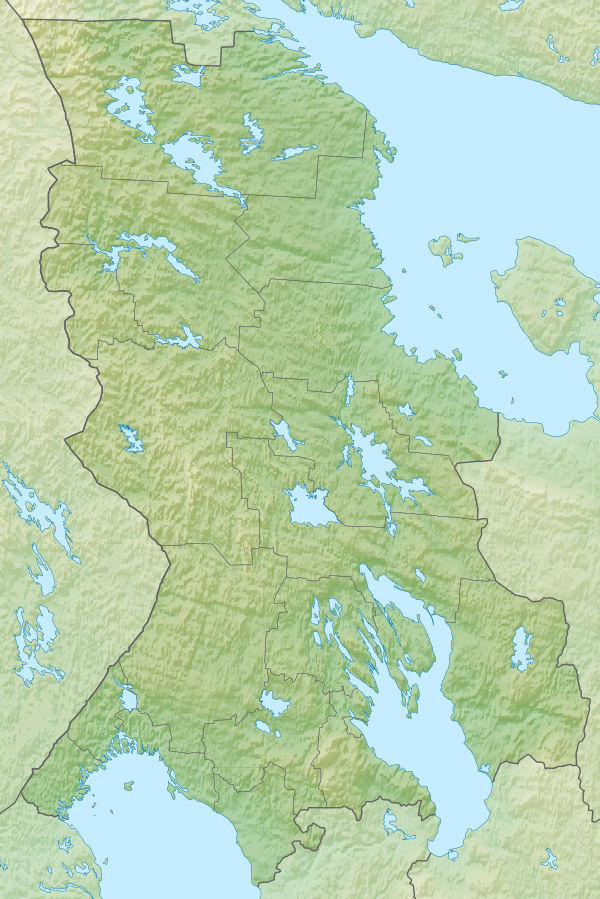
- Location within Karelia
- Location: Lake Onega
- Coordinates: 62°0′53″N 35°11′31″E
- Max. length: 20 km (12 mi)
- Max. width: 1.5 km (0.93 mi)
- Min. width: 0.1 km (0.062 mi)
- Islands: Kizhi Island

Kizhskiy Strait (Russian: Кижский пролив) is a strait in northwestern Russia (Republic of Karelia), located at 62°0′53″N 35°11′31″E, separating the islands Kizhskiye Shkery and the Zaonezhye Peninsula.

It connects the Bolshoye Onego Bay (Lake Onega) in the south-west with the Maloye Onego Bay in the north-east. It is 20 km long and 0.1–1.5 km wide.

== Sources ==
- Map of strait
