= Zaonezhye =

Russian: Заонежье
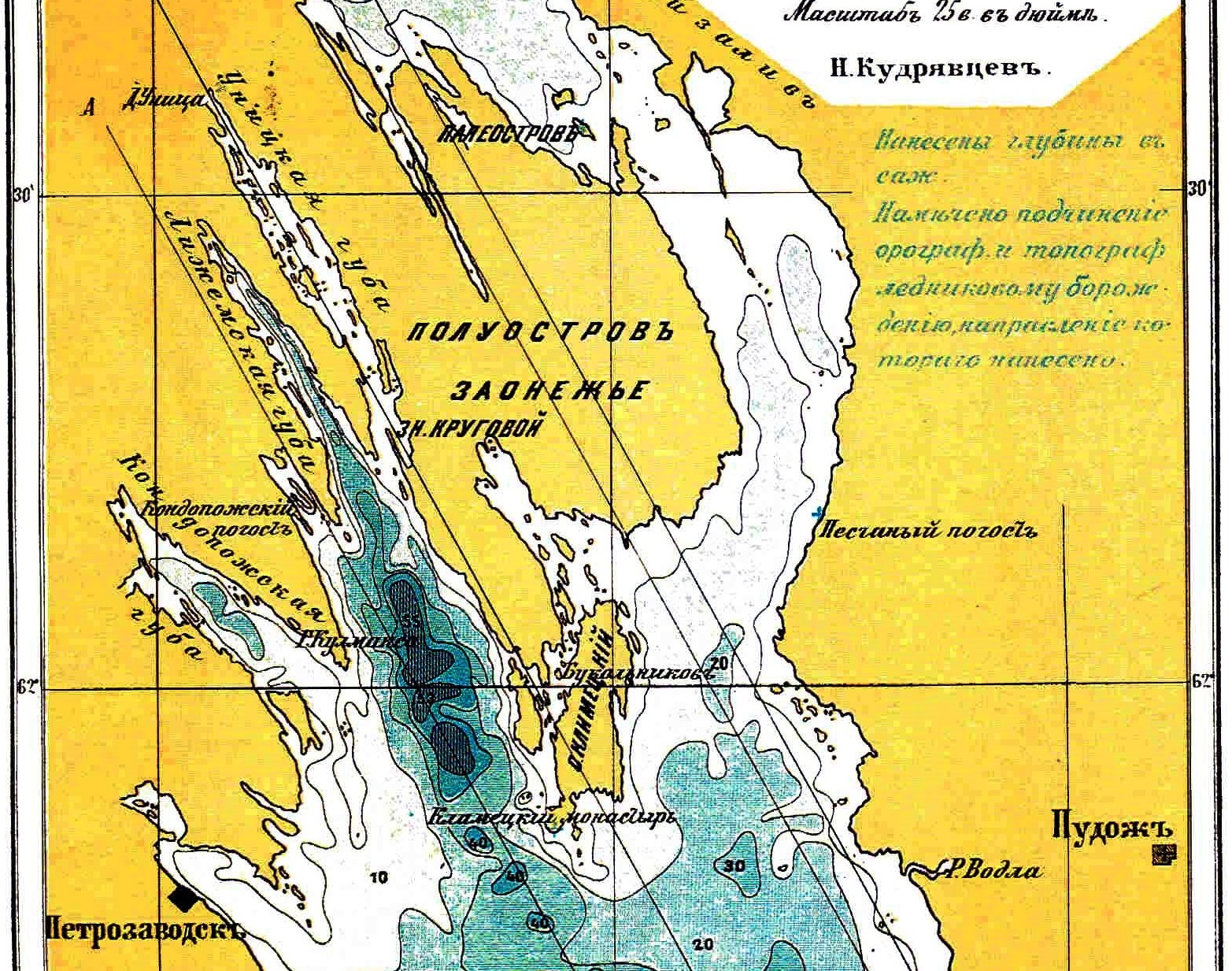
- Interactive map of Zaonezhye

Geography
- Coordinates: 62.35°N 35.18°E
- Adjacent to: Lake Onega
- Area: 12,000 km^{2} (4,600 sq mi)

Administration
- Russia
- Federal subject: Republic of Karelia

Zaonezhye (Russian: Заонежье) is a geographic region on the northern shore of Lake Onega in the Republic of Karelia of Russia, comprising the 12,000-square-kilometer (4,600 sq mi) Zaonezhsky Peninsula (Заонежский полуостров) and nearby islands. Administratively, the area belongs to the Medvezhyegorsky District.

== Geography ==
Zaonezhye comprises the Zaonezhsky Peninsula in the northern part of Lake Onega, covering an area of about 12,000 square kilometers (4,600 sq mi), as well as the nearby Kizhi archipelago, including islands such as Klimenetsky, Bolshoy Lelikovsky and Oleny. The peninsula is separated from the rest of the mainland by the Povenets Bay in the northeast as well as the Bolshoye Onego and Lizhma bays in the west. Administratively, Zaonezhye belongs to the Medvezhyegorsky District of the Republic of Karelia. More broadly, Zaonezhye may refer to the entire area on the shore opposite to Petrozavodsk.

Due to being surrounded by the lake Onega, the climate in Zaonezhye is milder than the average in Karelia, resulting in more diverse flora. Fertile soil containing shungite, referred to as "Zaonezhye chernozem", is a characteristic of Zaonezhye distinguishing it from the rest of Karelia. By contrast, podzols, which are common in most of Karelia, are rare on the peninsula. Historically, Zaonezhye was among the most significant agricultural areas in Karelia, with agriculture having been practiced since the 9th century.

== History ==
The peninsula was populated by Sámi people until being settled by Finnic and Slavic people between the 10th and 13th centuries. The Paleostrov Monastery was established in the early 15th century, followed by the Klimenets Monastery in the early 16th century. One of the founders of the Solovetsky Monastery, Zosimas of Solovki, came from the village of Tolvuya on the peninsula.

Zaonezhye was historically the most densely populated part of Karelia: in the late 19th century, the peninsula had a population of about 47,000 and a population density of 13.4 inhabitants per square kilometer (35/sq mi), while that in the entire Olonets Governorate, which included the peninsula, was only 2.8 inhabitants per square kilometer (7.3/sq mi). Many villages in the area have since been abandoned. Various old wooden buildings have been preserved in Zaonezhye, most notably the Kizhi Pogost on the island of Kizhi. In total, there are 96 buildings classified as architectural monuments in the area.

The local subgroup of Russians were known as the Zaonezhans (заонежане, or заонежана in the local dialect), who are the descendants of Russians from the Novgorod and Pskov Lands as well as Karelians and Veps people. As an ethnographic region, Zaonezhye comprises the Zaonezhsky Peninsula and nearby islands, as well as the village of Pegrema on the mainland west of the peninsula.
