= Administrative divisions of the Republic of Karelia =

Administrative districts of Russian federal subject

Republic of Karelia Russia
- Capital: Petrozavodsk

Administrative structure (as of 2009)
- Districts: 15
- Cities/towns: 13
- Urban-type settlements: 11
- Selsovets: 0

Municipal structure (as of 2002)
- Rural settlements: 775 (inhabited); 94 (uninhabited)

Map of the Republic of Karelia

Republic of Karelia is a federal subject of Russia.

== Administrative and municipal divisions ==
Map

Division	Structure		OKATO	OKTMO	Urban-type settlement/ district-level town*
Division	Administrative	Municipal	OKATO	OKTMO	Urban-type settlement/ district-level town*
Petrozavodsk (Петрозаводск)	city	urban okrug	86 401	86 701	
Kostomuksha (Костомукша)	city	urban okrug	86 406	86 706	
Sortavala (Сортавала)	city	district	86 410	86 610	Khelyulya (Хелюля); Vyartsilya (Вяртсиля)
Belomorsky (Беломорский)	district		86 204	86 604	Belomorsk (Беломорск) town*
Kalevalsky (Калевальский)	district		86 209	86 609	Kalevala (Калевала)
Kemsky (Кемский)	district		86 212	86 612	Kem (Кемь) town*
Kondopozhsky (Кондопожский)	district		86 215	86 615	Kondopoga (Кондопога) town*
Lakhdenpokhsky (Лахденпохский)	district		86 218	86 618	Lakhdenpokhya (Лахденпохья) town*
Loukhsky (Лоухский)	district		86 221	86 621	Chupa (Чупа); Loukhi (Лоухи); Pyaozersky (Пяозерский)
Medvezhyegorsky (Медвежьегорский)	district		86 224	86 624	Medvezhyegorsk (Медвежьегорск) town*; Pindushi (Пиндуши); Povenets (Повенец)
Muyezersky (Муезерский)	district		86 227	86 627	Muyezersky (Муезерский)
Olonetsky (Олонецкий)	district		86 230	86 630	Olonets (Олонец) town*
Pitkyarantsky (Питкярантский)	district		86 233	86 633	Pitkyaranta (Питкяранта) town*
Prionezhsky (Прионежский)	district		86 236	86 636	
Pryazhinsky (Пряжинский)	district		86 239	86 639	Pryazha (Пряжа)
Pudozhsky (Пудожский)	district		86 242	86 642	Pudozh (Пудож) town*
Segezhsky (Сегежский)	district		86 245	86 645	Segezha (Сегежа) town*; Nadvoitsy (Надвоицы)
Suoyarvsky (Суоярвский)	district		86 250	86 650	Suoyarvi (Суоярви) town*

== See also ==
- Veps National Volost
