= Pegrema =

Village in Medvezhyegorsky District, Karelia, Russia

Coordinates: 62.3265°N 34.766°E

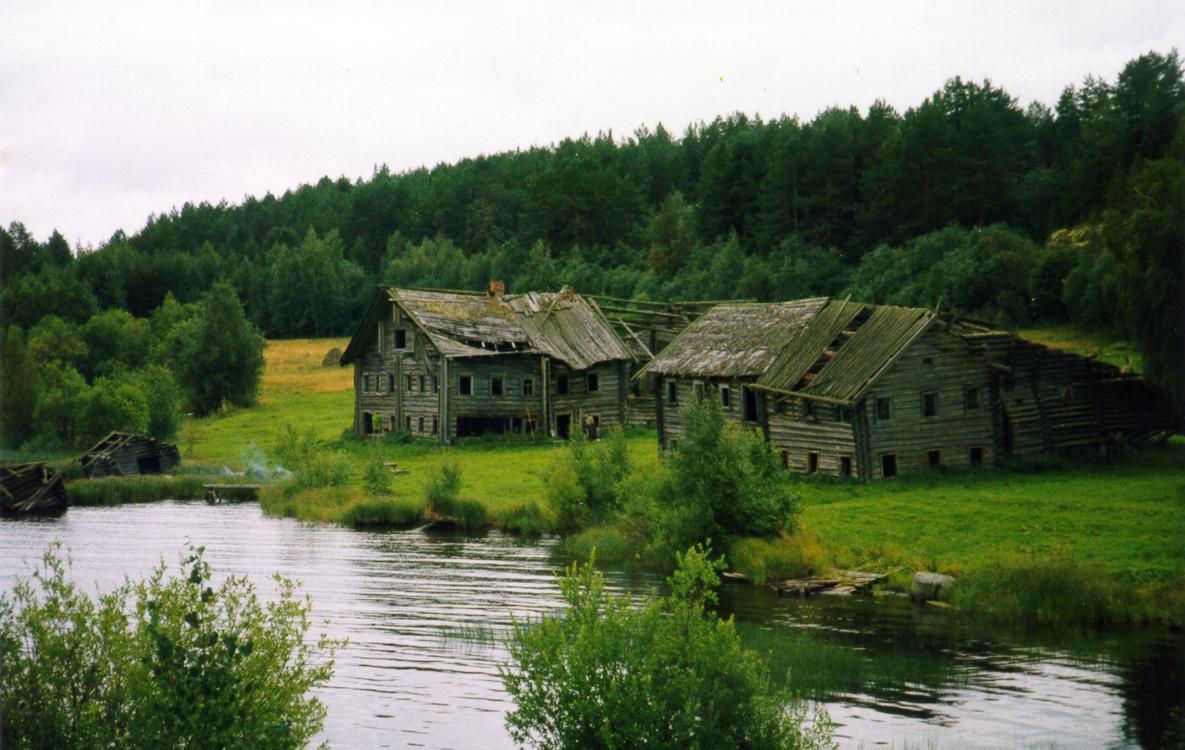
Disintegrating houses in abandoned villages of Pegrema

Approximate location of Pegrema

Pegrema (Russian: Пе́грема) is an abandoned village in Medvezhyegorsky District of the Republic of Karelia, Russia, situated on a bank of Lake Onega, about 10 km from Unitsa.

== History ==
=== Prehistory ===
The site of the village Pegrema is believed to have been an "Innovation Centre" throughout the Mesolithic period. Pollen data as well as macrofossils suggest a continuous, albeit sporadic human presence from approximately 4200BC-3000BC. This data does not suggest any significant natural disasters to have occurred in the area throughout this period. However, a distinct lack of any architectural evidence from either the Iron Age or Bronze Age suggests a potential depopulation of the area.

=== Early history ===
The start of land clearance for a permanent settlement and cultivation site is approximated to the late 13th Century. More intensive field cultivation, however, is approximately dated to the 15th Century, as according to pollen data.

=== Later History ===
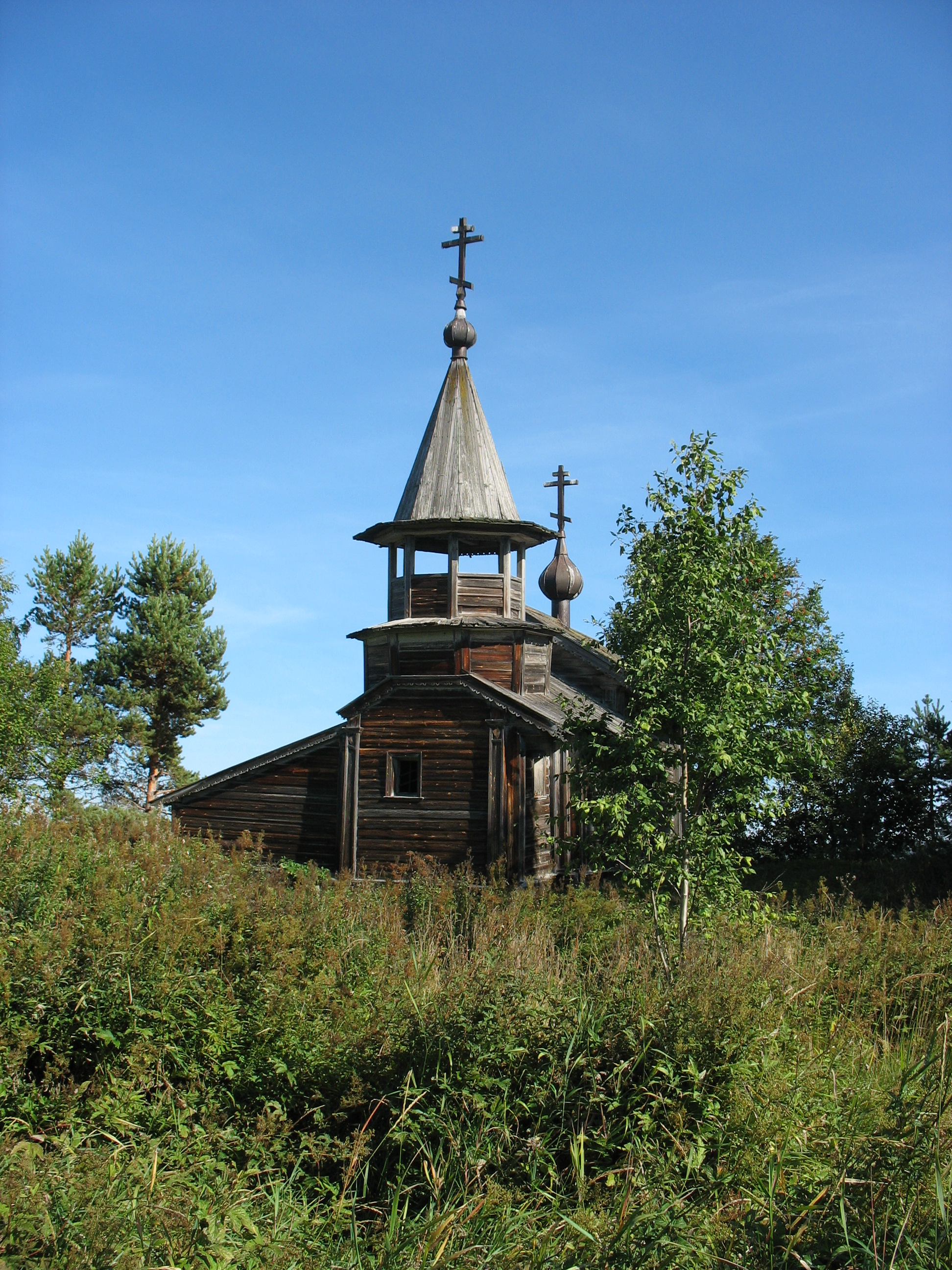
An image of the Orthordox Chapel of Saint Varlaam of Khutyn in Pegrema, which has remained mostly intact.

In the 1770s, the Varlaam Khutynsky chapel was built on a little cape in front of the houses. The chapel remains almost completely intact, although all icons were removed from it after the Russian Revolution.

=== Abandonment and Modern History ===
Following the Russian Revolution, the village began to depopulate, ultimately being abandoned in 1956 by Soviet authorities. Since, it has been listed alongside the nearby Kizhi Island as a UNESCO World Heritage site. While studying the area, Zuravlev believed the area was depopulated due to an earthquake; however, a study taken by M. Saarnisto in the years 1994 and 1995 suggest this earthquake to have taken place far earlier.

== Geography ==
Pegrema can be found in the large Lake Onega region, in the Medvezhyegorsky District of the Republic of Karelia, Russia. It can be found 65 km North of the city of Petrozavodsk, on the Western shore of Unitskaya Guba (bay). Of the numerous peasant houses that scatter the village, all of them face the lake.
