= Medvezhyegorsky =

Medvezhyegorsky (masculine), Medvezhyegorskaya (feminine), or Medvezhyegorskoye (neuter) may refer to:

- Medvezhyegorsky District, a district of the Republic of Karelia, Russia
- Medvezhyegorskoye Urban Settlement, a municipal formation which the town of Medvezhyegorsk and three rural localities in Medvezhyegorsky District of the Republic of Karelia, Russia are incorporated as
