= Andoma =

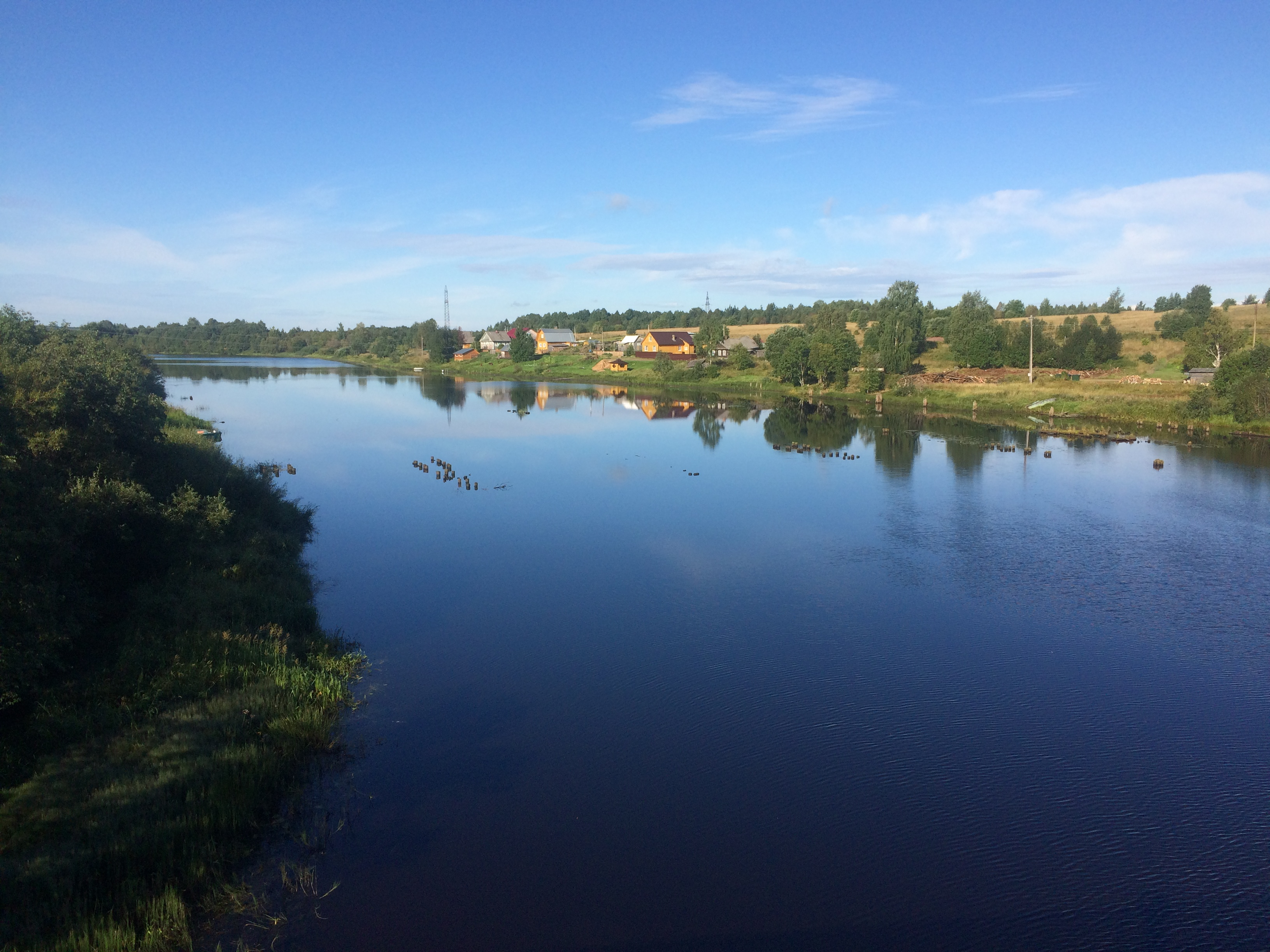

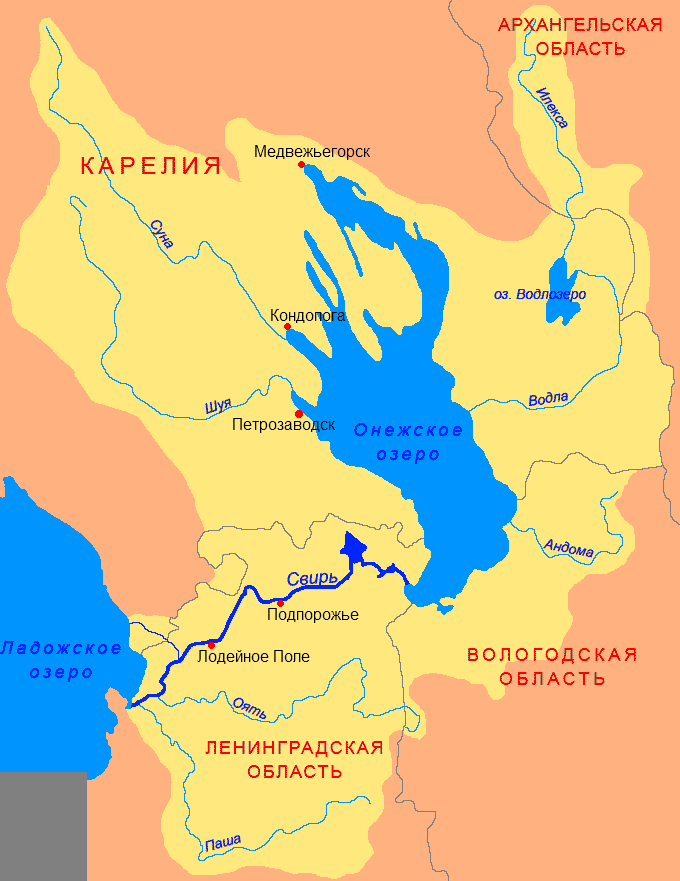
- Location of the Andoma in the Lake Onega-Svir basin
- Native name: Андома (Russian)

Location
- Country: Russia

Physical characteristics
- Source
  - location: Lake Groptozero
- Mouth: Lake Onega
  - coordinates: 61.2852°N 36.3989°E
  - elevation: 33 m (108 ft)
- Length: 156 km (97 mi)
- Basin size: 2,570 km^{2} (990 mi^{2})

Basin features
- Progression: Lake Onega→ Svir→ Lake Ladoga→ Neva→ Gulf of Finland

The Andoma (Russian: Андома) is a river in Vytegorsky District of Vologda Oblast in Russia. It flows out of Lake Groptozero and is a tributary of Lake Onega. It is 156 kilometres (97 mi) long, and the area of its basin 2,570 square kilometres (990 sq mi). The main tributary of the Andoma is the Samina (right).

The river basin of the Andoma occupies much of the northern part of Vytegorsky District. The river flows through the Andoma Hills, and the basin contains many lakes of glacial origin. The biggest lake in the Andoma Basin is Lake Aynozero.

The source of the Andoma is in the system of lakes in the northern part of Vytegorsky District. The river flows in the general direction south, turns west, and eventually northwest. The lower course of the Andoma is populated. In the village of Sorokopolye the Andoma accepts the Samina from the right, and downstream from this place it forms a delta as it flows into Lake Onega.

A short stretch of a highway connecting Vologda and Medvezhyegorsk via Vytegra and Pudozh runs along the Andoma, crossing it over a bridge in the village of Sorokopolye.

Between 1927 and 1957 Andomsky District with the center in the selo of Andomsky Pogost existed, first in Leningrad Oblast, from 1937 on in Vologda Oblast. In 1957, the district was abolished and merged into Vytegorsky District. Both the selo, located upstream from Sorokopolye, and the district were named after the Andoma.
