= Samina River =

Samina River is a name of several rivers.

- Samina River, a river in Liechtenstein and Austria;
- Samina River, a tributary of the Andoma River, Vologda Oblast, Russia.
