= Kizhi Pogost =

- Кижский погост (Russian)
- View of two main churches

- Location within European Russia Location within Europe
- 62.066667°N 35.225°E
- Location: Lake Onega, Republic of Karelia, Russia

History
- Built: 17th–18th centuries

UNESCO World Heritage Site
- Official name: Kizhi Pogost
- Type: Cultural
- Criteria: i, iv, v
- Designated: 1990 (14th session)
- Reference no.: 544
- Region: Europe and North America

Kizhi Pogost (Russian: Кижский погост) is a historical site dating from the 17th century on Kizhi island. The island is located on Lake Onega in the Republic of Karelia (Medvezhyegorsky District), Russia. The pogost is the area inside a fence which includes two large wooden churches (the 22-dome Transfiguration Church and the 9-dome Intercession Church) and a bell-tower. The pogost is famous for its beauty and longevity, despite being built exclusively of wood. In 1990, it was included in the UNESCO list of World Heritage sites and in 1993 listed as a Russian Cultural Heritage site.

== General information ==
The pogost was built on the southern part of Kizhi island, on a hill 4 meters above the Lake Onega level. Its major basic structural unit is a round log of Scots Pine (Pinus sylvestris) about 30 cm in diameter and 3 to 5 meters long. The Kizhi Pogost was built without using a single nail. Many thousands of logs were brought for construction from the mainland, a complex logistical task in that time. The Kizhi Pogost is a unique monument of Russian wooden architecture, a universally recognized masterpiece of world architecture. It is noted for the harmony of its dimensions and shapes, and the artistic unity of its structures, built at different times. The architectural beauty of the ensemble is emphasized by the expressive landscape, which can be considered as a national landscape.

== The Church of the Transfiguration ==
The Church of the Transfiguration (Russian: Церковь Преображения Господня) is the most remarkable part of the pogost. It is not heated and is, therefore, called a summer church and does not hold winter services. Its altar was laid June 6, 1714, as inscribed on the cross located inside the church. This church was built on the site of the old one which was burnt by lightning. The builders' names are unknown. A legend tells that the main builder used one axe for the whole construction, which he threw into the lake upon completion with the words "there was not and will be not another one to match it".

The church has 22 domes and with a height of 37 meters is one of the tallest wooden buildings in Northern Europe. Its perimeter is 20×29 meters. It is considered that the 18-dome church on the southern shore of Lake Onega — built in 1708 and destroyed by fire in 1963 – was its forerunner. According to the Russian carpentry traditions of that time, the Transfiguration Church was built of wood only with no nails apart from the domes and roof shingles. There are approximately 180,000 nails securing the 60,000 roof shingles. All structures were made of scribe-fitted horizontal logs, with interlocking corner joinery — either round notch or dovetail — cut by axes. The basis of the structure is the octahedral frame with four two-stage side attachments (Russian: прируб, "prirub" from "rubit" meaning "to cut wood"). The eastern prirub has a pentagonal shape and contains the altar. Two smaller octagons of similar shape are mounted on top of the main octagon. The structure is covered in 22 domes of different size and shape, which run from the top to the sides. The refectory is covered with a three-slope roof. In the 19th century, the church was decorated with batten and some parts were covered with steel. It was restored to its original design in the 1950s.

The church framework rests on a stone base without a deep foundation, except for the western aisle for which a foundation was built in 1870. Most wood is pine with spruce planks on the flat roofs. The domes are covered in aspen.

The iconostasis has four levels (Russian: четырёхъярусный) and contains 102 icons. It is dated to the second half of the 18th – early 19th century. The icons are from three periods: the two oldest icons, "The Transfiguration" (Russian: Преображение) and "Intercession" (Russian: Покров) are from the late 17th century and are typical of the northern style. The central icons are from the second half of the 18th century and are also of the local style. Most icons of the three upper tiers are of the late 18th century, brought from various parts of Russia.

Details of the domes (Transfiguration Church)	Church of the Intercession of the Virgin	Belfry and the Church of the Transfiguration

== The Church of the Intercession ==
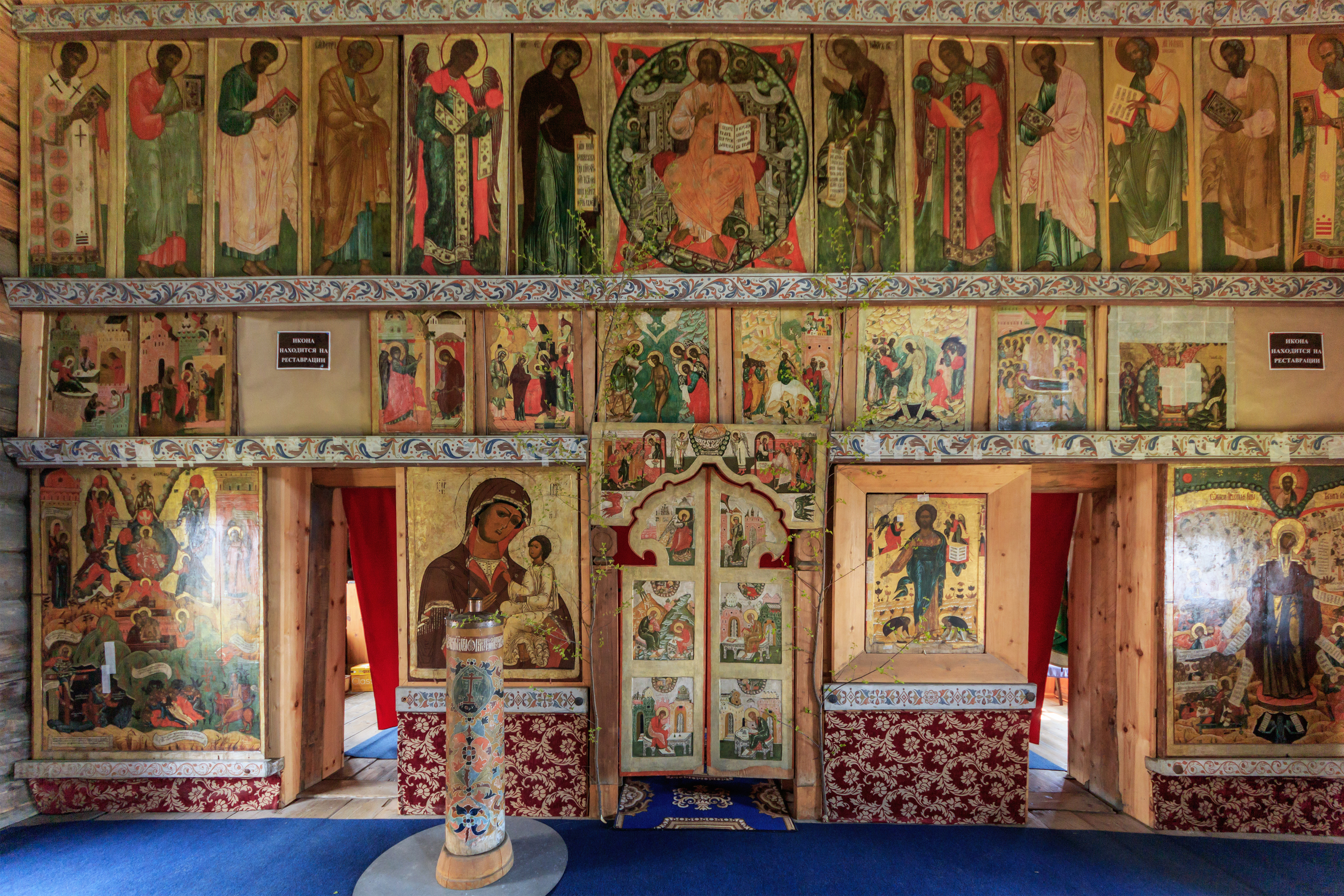
Inside the Church of the Intercession

Exterior of the church

The Church of the Intercession (Russian: Покровская церковь) is a heated ("winter") church where services are held from October 1 until Easter. The church was the first on the island after a fire in the late 17th century destroyed all previous churches. It was first built in 1694 as a single-dome structure, then reconstructed in 1720–1749 and in 1764 rebuilt into its present 9-dome design as an architectural echo of the main Transfiguration Church. It stands 27 meters tall with a 28×8 meter perimeter. There are nine domes, one larger in the center, surrounded by eight smaller ones. Decoration is scant. A high single-part porch leads into the four interior parts of the church. As in the Transfiguration Church, the altar is placed in the eastern part shaped as a pentagon. The original iconostasis was replaced at the end of the 19th century and is lost; it was rebuilt in the 1950s to the original style.

== Belfry ==
The original bell-tower rapidly deteriorated and was re-built in 1862 and further reconstructed in 1874 and 1900. The tower stands 30 meters tall with a 6×6 meter perimeter. It has a square wooden frame resting on a foundation (rubble with lime mortar); the frame is divided inside by two walls into three rooms: antechamber, stairs and a storage place. Above the square frame, there is an octagonal part with the zvonnitsa on top. Then there is a pyramidal (octagonal) roof resting on pillars. The roof is topped with a cross. Wood types are the same as in the churches: pine, spruce and aspen.

== Restoration interventions and criticism on the project ==
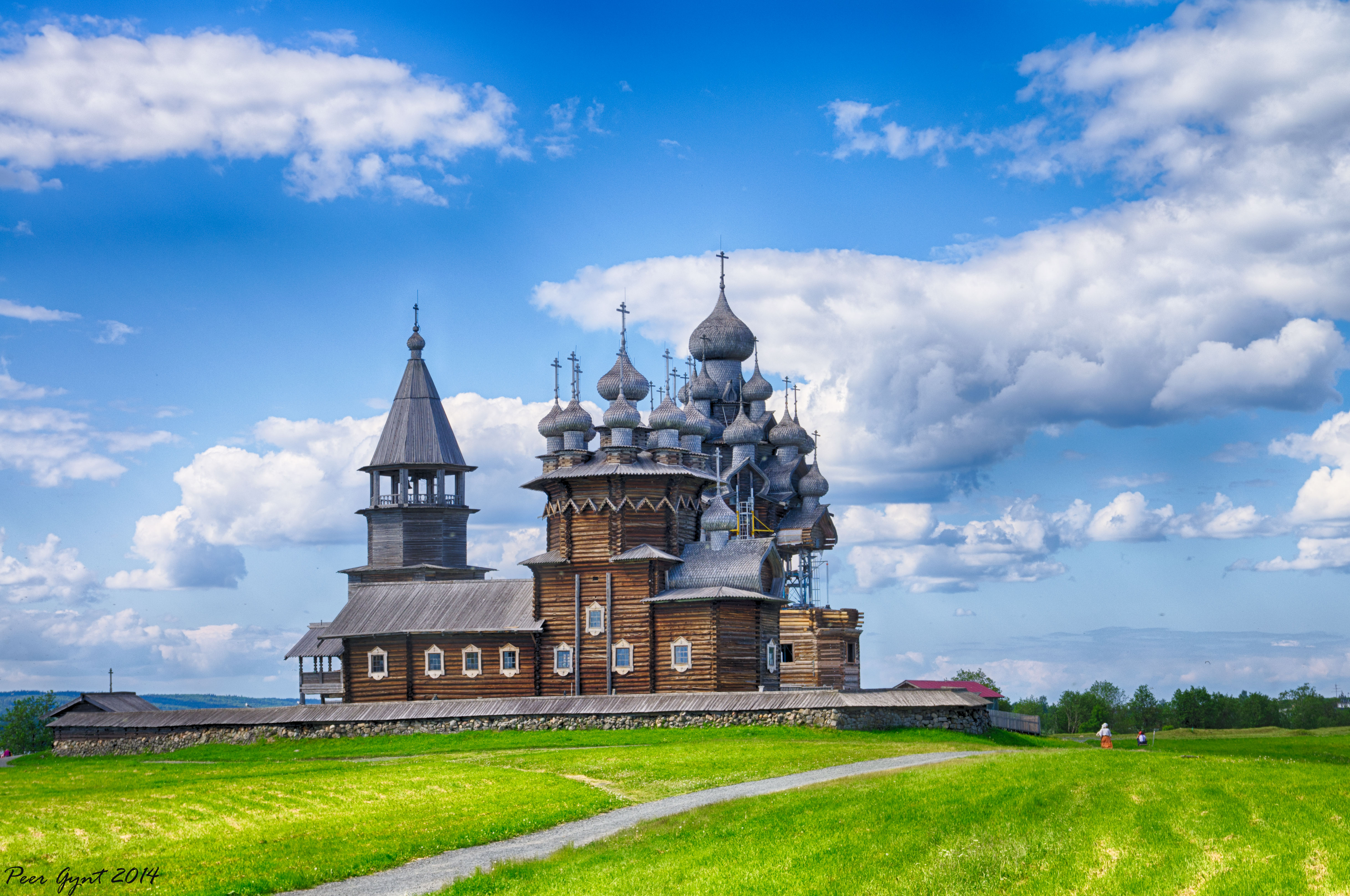
Church of the Transfiguration in 2014

Between 1999 and 2007, a significant and complex restoration project was implemented at the Church of the Transfiguration of Our Lord on Kizhi Island. The project combined scientific research, engineering technologies, traditional carpentry methods, and international restoration standards and was finally finished in 2014. For more than ten years, specialists worked to preserve the monument and restore its structural stability, authentic architectural form, and cultural function. The restoration activities were built around four key principles recommended by ICOMOS and widely accepted in international practice: minimal intervention, reversibility, distinguishability, and compatibility. The basis for the technical specifications for the design and realization of restoration works was formed based on those principles, and they were followed at all stages.

A comprehensive study of the monument's current state was conducted before restoration began. Diagnostics included 3D scanning, geodetic survey, dendrological and mycological analysis, and physical and mechanical testing of wooden elements. Research showed that a large part of the lower crowns and supporting structures were biologically destroyed, the spatial geometry was disrupted, and in some areas, deformations of the log house began, which was threatening the stability of the structure.

The critical node was the octagon which is supporting the dome system. There were recordings of some dangerous deviations from the vertical, caused by shrinkage and the foundation's gradual destruction. That data became the base for making a fundamental but controversial decision: first to carry out a phased dismantling of the church, preserve suitable elements, replace the destroyed ones, and then reassemble with control and preservation of the original spatial logic. The dismantling process was carried out with significant precision. Each beam, crown, and connecting element was numbered, photographed, and entered into a digital database. Drawings of all units were created, and the shapes of log houses, corner joints, and the geometry of the domes were recorded. By that, architectural continuity was ensured during reassembly. Architects used a method of a complete disassemblable restoration cycle, similar to that used in Japan when repairing temples of the Edo period. In international practice, this is considered acceptable if it is impossible to ensure stability and preserve most of the original in any other way.

Only those elements that were more than 50% destroyed were subject to replacement. The total volume of replacement was about 30% of the entire structure. For the new elements, pine wood harvested in Karelia in winter was used in the same climatic conditions as the original material. Attention was paid to the density of annual rings, humidity, and grain direction. The wood was naturally dried and acclimatized in conditions close to the island's microclimate. The inserts were marked visually (by color) and in the design documentation. This approach allowed to simultaneously comply with the principle of distinguishability and not violate the aesthetic perception of the whole architectural image.

The connections were made using traditional techniques—dovetail, cup with root tenon, and ochryap (охряп). These technologies were carefully reconstructed based on studying existing fragments. For example, some hidden metal ties and anchors were used where necessary to strengthen the octagon support or stabilize horizontal ties in the galleries. Real-time monitoring of the monument's condition was a key part of the project. Sensors were installed to measure temperature, humidity, and any structural deformations, which allowed to observe how the structure behaved in its working environment and also helped manage the climate inside.

Keeping the right climate inside the monument was very important. A so-called "control zone" was created inside the interior, where humidity, temperature, and air exchange were measured. The data obtained formed the basis for recommendations on the ventilation routine, limiting the number of visitors, and seasonal operation. Passive ventilation methods adapted to the specific climatic conditions of Kizhi Island played a unique role. The architects were also aiming to provide conditions for the safe return of the liturgical function, which required additional lighting, heating, and sound amplification devices. All of this was implemented covertly, with minimal visual impact.

When the restoration began, many decorative elements (crosses, crowns, and carved architraves ) had been lost. Their recreation was done after archival photos, historical descriptions, and analogs from other monuments of the Russian North. All the recreated parts were marked and slightly different in shade, making it possible to distinguish between the new and the old visually. It was decided not to recreate some elements that had lost their function. This approach corresponds to the principle of "hypothetical inserts"; architects avoid commenting on what is not confirmed by sources.

An information campaign accompanied the restoration of the church. Reports, photographs, and diagrams were published on the museum's website. Students, young architects, and carpenters were involved in the process. A training program on the restoration of wooden architecture was created, and due to that, traditional carpentry and modern heritage protection principles grew. International Expertise and Recognition. UNESCO and ICOMOS praised the project. Consultants from Norway, Japan, and Finland participated in the methodological part and recommended the solutions to be applied. In 2021, the project was awarded the Russian Government Prize in Culture as an exemplary example of preserving national heritage.

Despite the recognition, the project also attracted criticism. The main controversy was about the adequacy of dismantling used as a restoration method; experts suggest that each dismantling reduces the historical value of the object, even with fixation. However, otherwise, it was not possible for Kizhi Church to maintain structural stability without dismantling. Balance was positive between scientific restoration, traditional methods, and modern technologies. Such balance made it possible to conserve the monument and serve as a model for future wooden architecture restoration projects.

== In popular culture ==
The Church of the Transfiguration is the Wonder for the Slavs in the PC game Age of Empires 2: Definitive Edition.

== Fence ==
The fence serves no defensive purpose at all. It is a symbolic division between the holy ground and the outside world. It was reconstructed in the 1950s as a 300-meter-long log structure surrounding the two churches and the belfry. The structure rests on a tall boulder basement. The main entrance is 14.4 meters wide and 2.25 meters tall, and faces east near the Church of the Intercession. There are wicket gates at the eastern and northern sides and a small wooden tower in the north-western corner. The tower has a square base and a four-slope batten roof with a spire. The walls, gates and wickets are also roofed.
