= Sorokopolye =

Sorokopolye Сорокополье
- Settlement
- Location within Vologda Oblast Location within Russia
- Coordinates: 61°15′N 36°33′E
- Country: Russia
- Region: Vologda Oblast
- District: Vytegorsky District
- Time zone: UTC+3:00

Sorokopolye (Russian: Сорокополье) is a rural locality (a settlement) in Andomskoye Rural Settlement, Vytegorsky District, Vologda Oblast, Russia. The population was 7 as of 2002. There are 5 streets.

== Geography ==
Sorokopolye is located 37 kilometres (23 mi) north of Vytegra (the district's administrative centre) by road. Novaya Selga is the nearest rural locality.
