= Pindushi =

Pindushi Пиндуши Pinduši (Karelian)
- Urban-type settlement
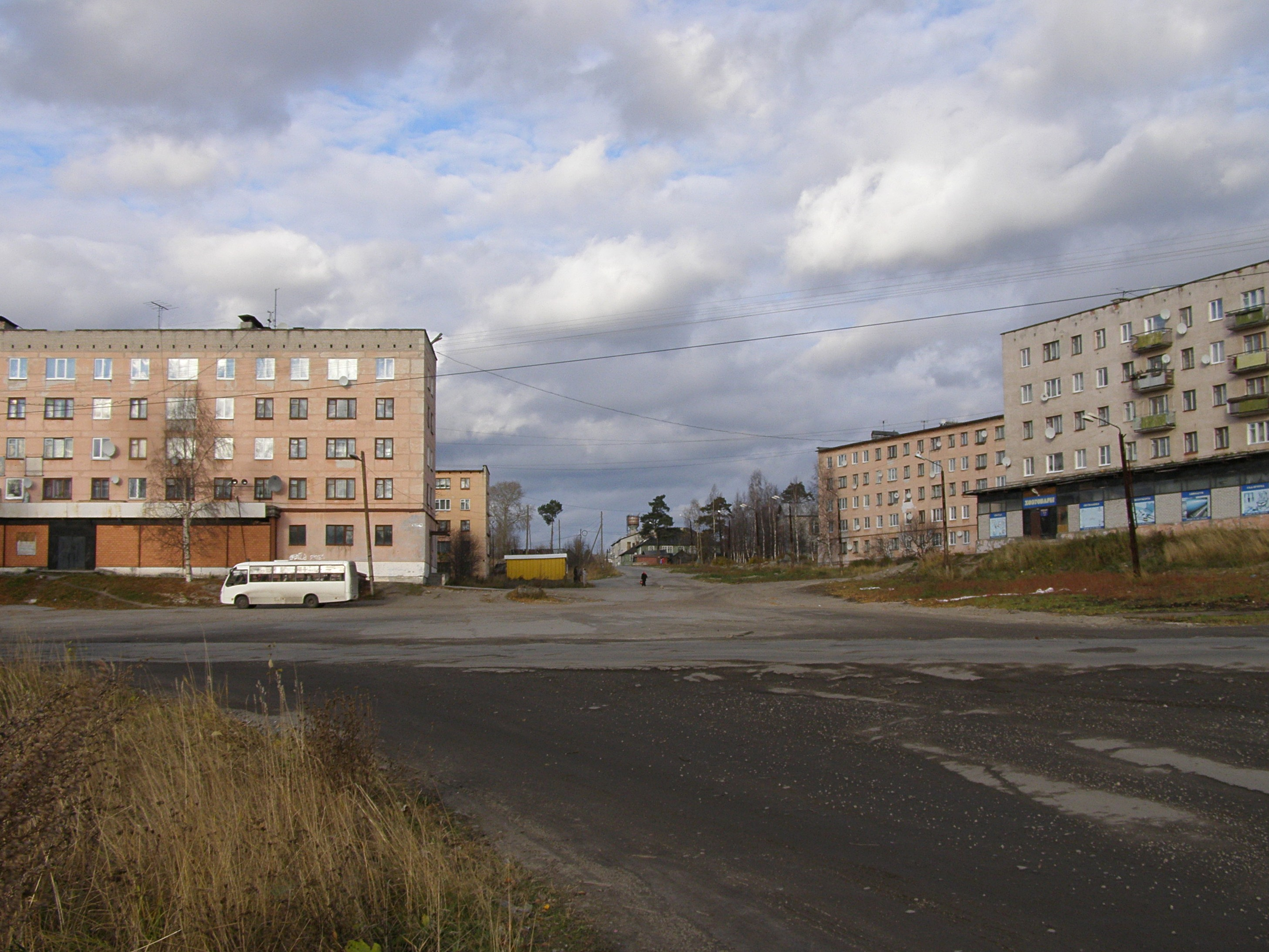

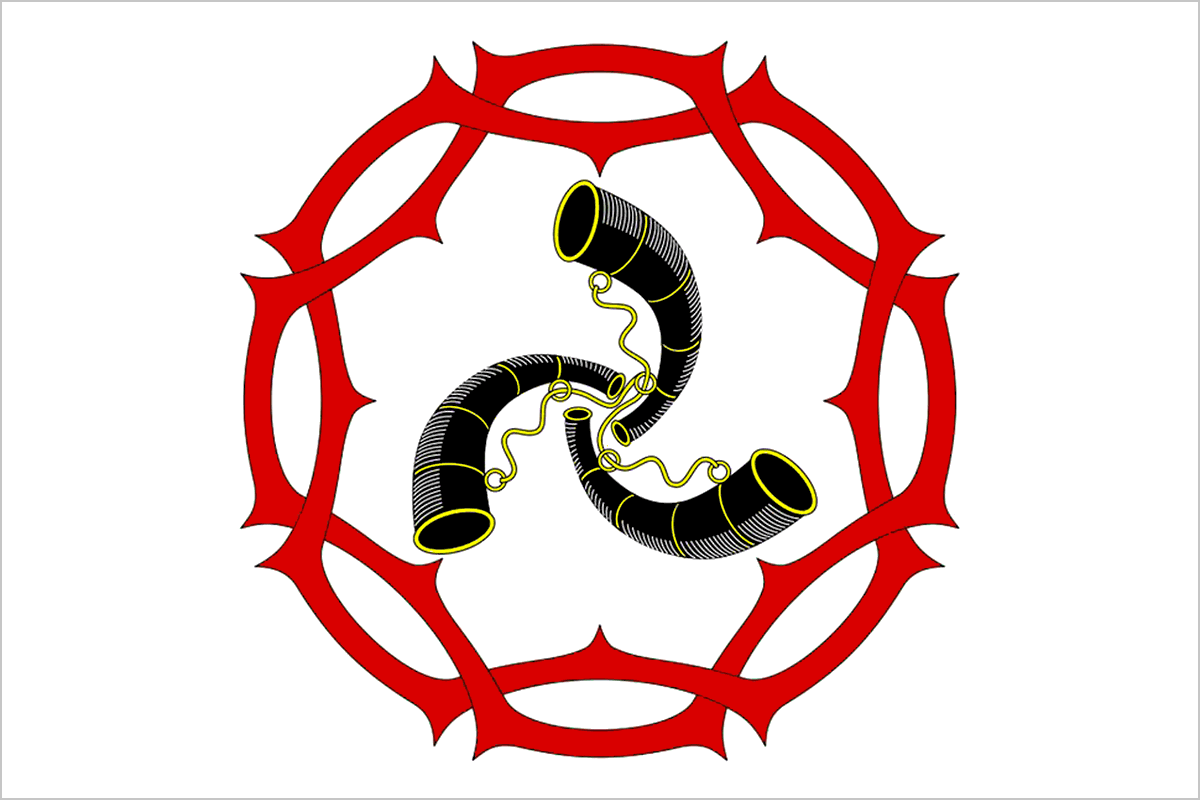
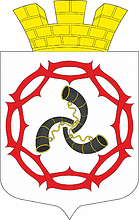
- Flag Coat of arms
- Interactive map of Pindushi
- Location of Pindushi Pindushi (Karelia)
- Coordinates: 62°55′N 34°35′E
- Country: Russia
- Federal subject: Republic of Karelia
- Administrative district: Medvezhyegorsky District
- Founded: 1933
- Urban-type settlement status since: 1950

Population (2010 Census)
  - Total: 4,598
  - Estimate (2025): 3,746 (−18.5%)

Municipal status
  - Municipal district: Medvezhyegorsky Municipal District
  - Urban settlement: Pindushskoye Urban Settlement
  - Capital of: Pindushskoye Urban Settlement
- Time zone: UTC+3 (UTC+03:00)
- Postal code: 186323
- OKTMO ID: 86624155051

Pindushi population
- 2010 Census: 4,598
- 2002 Census: 5,190
- 1989 Census: 6,611
- 1979 Census: 5,644

Pindushi (Russian: Пи́ндуши; Karelian: Pinduši; Finnish: Pinduinen) is an urban locality (an urban-type settlement) in Medvezhyegorsky District of the Republic of Karelia, Russia, located on the northern tip of Lake Onega, 160 kilometers (99 mi) north of Petrozavodsk, the capital of the republic. As of the 2010 Census, its population was 4,598.

== History ==
It was established in 1933 and granted urban-type settlement status in 1950.

== Administrative and municipal status ==
Within the framework of administrative divisions, the urban-type settlement of Pindushi is subordinated to Medvezhyegorsky District. As a municipal division, Pindushi, together with eight rural localities, is incorporated within Medvezhyegorsky Municipal District as Pindushskoye Urban Settlement.
