= Povenets =

Povenets Повенец Poventsa (Karelian)
- Urban-type settlement
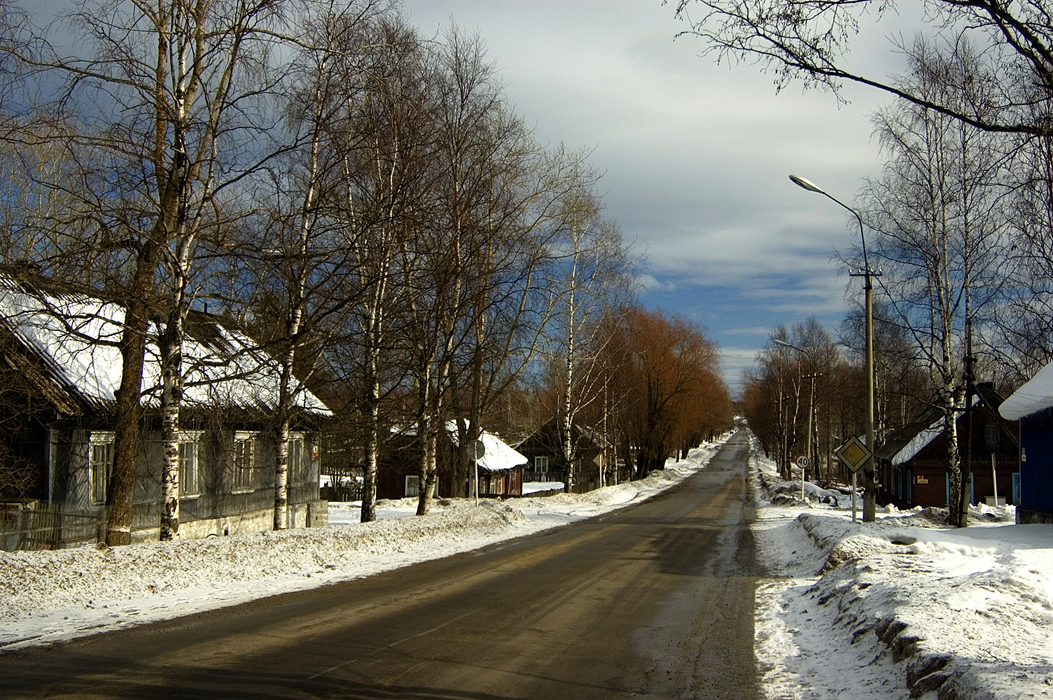
- A street in Povenets

- Flag Coat of arms
- Interactive map of Povenets
- Location of Povenets Povenets (Karelia)
- Coordinates: 62°51′N 34°49′E
- Country: Russia
- Federal subject: Republic of Karelia
- Administrative district: Medvezhyegorsky District
- Urban-type settlement status since: 1938

Population (2010 Census)
  - Total: 2,209
  - Estimate (2025): 1,753 (−20.6%)

Municipal status
  - Municipal district: Medvezhyegorsky Municipal District
  - Urban settlement: Povenetskoye Urban Settlement
  - Capital of: Povenetskoye Urban Settlement
- Time zone: UTC+3 (UTC+03:00)
- Postal code: 186326
- OKTMO ID: 86624160051

Povenets population
- 2010 Census: 2,209
- 2002 Census: 2,608
- 1989 Census: 4,208
- 1979 Census: 3,766

Povenets (Russian: Повене́ц; Karelian: Poventsa; Finnish: Poventsa) is an urban locality (an urban-type settlement) in Medvezhyegorsky District of the Republic of Karelia, Russia, located on the shore of Lake Onega, 231 kilometers (144 mi) north of Petrozavodsk, the capital of the republic. As of the 2010 Census, its population was 2,209.

== History ==
Povenets is located 19 kilometers (12 mi) from Sandarmokh, the site of mass execution by shooting and burial of victims of the Soviet political repressions.

Urban-type settlement status was granted to Povenets in 1938.

Povenets marked the furthest advance by Finnish troops during the World War II Continuation War 1941-1944. The town was occupied by Finnish troops on 6 December 1941. Soviet forces retook the town in July 1944.

== Administrative and municipal status ==
Within the framework of administrative divisions, the urban-type settlement of Povenets is subordinated to Medvezhyegorsky District. As a municipal division, Povenets, together with seventeen rural localities, is incorporated within Medvezhyegorsky Municipal District as Povenetskoye Urban Settlement.
