= Lake Onega =

Freshwater lake in Russia, second largest in Europe

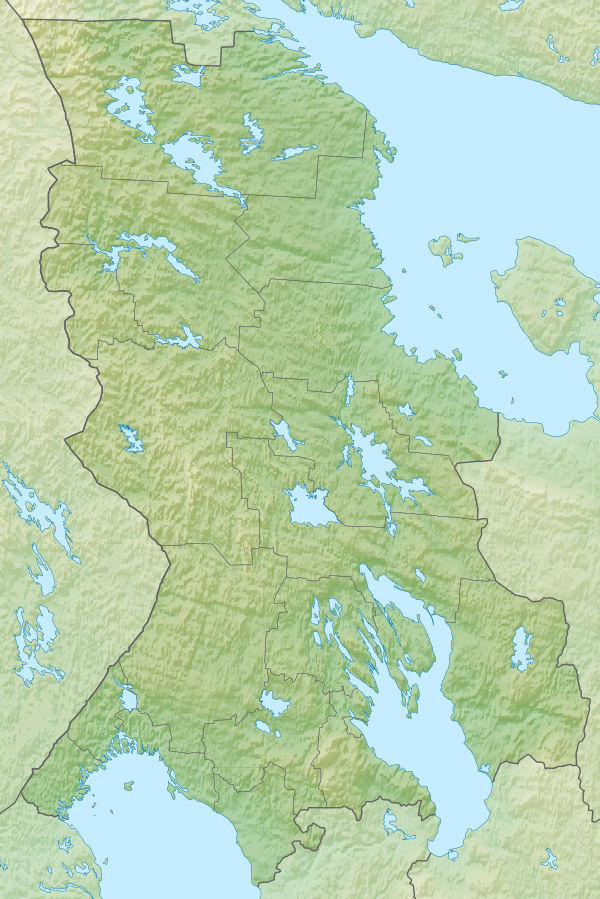
- Location within Karelia
- Interactive map of Lake Onega
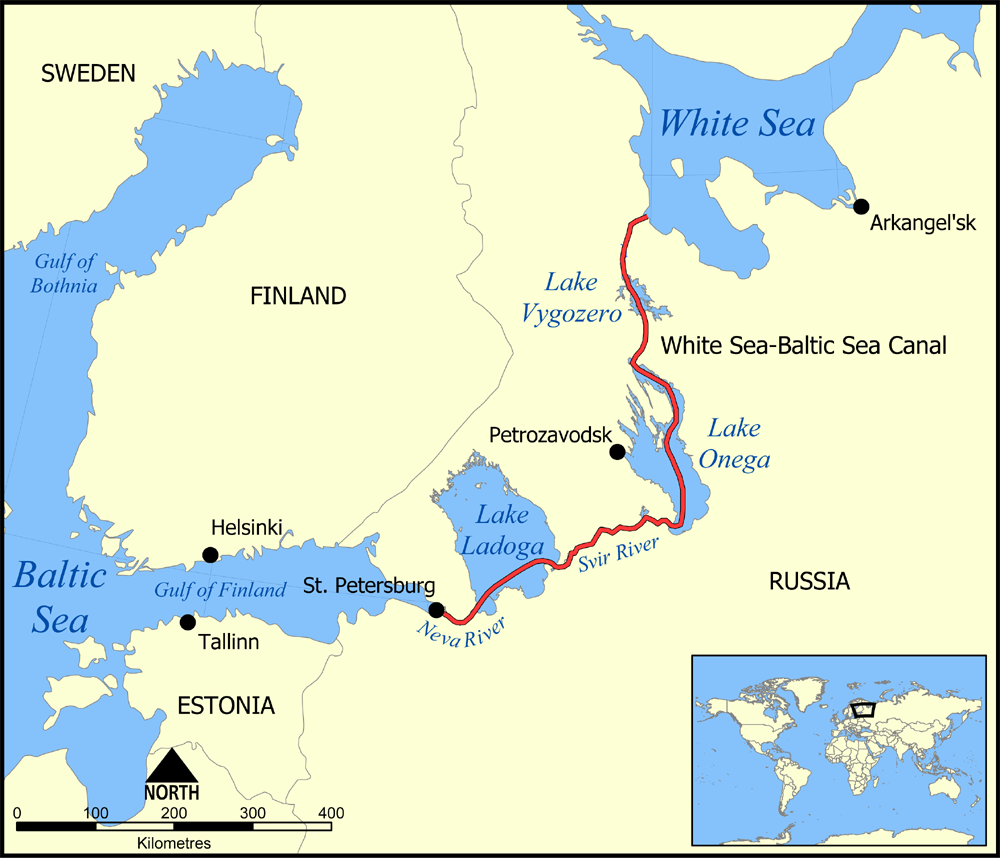
- Coordinates: 61°41′26″N 35°39′20″E
- Primary inflows: 58 rivers (Shuya, Suna, Vodla, Vytegra, Andoma)
- Primary outflows: Svir
- Basin countries: Russia
- Max. length: 245 km (152 mi)
- Max. width: 91.6 km (56.9 mi)
- Surface area: 9,891 km^{2} (3,819 sq mi)
- Average depth: 30 m (98 ft)
- Max. depth: 127 m (417 ft)
- Water volume: 291 km^{3} (70 cu mi)
- Surface elevation: 33 m (108 ft)
- Islands: 1,369 (Kizhi Island)
- Settlements: Kondopoga, Medvezhyegorsk, Petrozavodsk, Pindushi, Povenets

Lake Onega (/oʊ.ˈnɛ.ɡə/; also known as Onego; Russian: Оне́жское о́зеро, romanized: Onezhskoe ozero, IPA: [ɐˈnʲɛʂskəɪ ˈozʲɪrə]; Finnish: Ääninen, Äänisjärvi; Livvi: Oniegujärvi; Veps: Änine, Änižjärv) is a lake in northwestern Russia, on the territory of the Republic of Karelia, Leningrad Oblast and Vologda Oblast. It belongs to the basin of the Baltic Sea, and is the second-largest lake in Europe after Lake Ladoga, slightly smaller than Lebanon. The lake is fed by about 50 rivers and is drained by the Svir.

There are about 1,650 islands on the lake. They include Kizhi, which hosts a historical complex of 89 Orthodox churches and other wooden structures of the 15th–20th centuries. The complex includes a UNESCO World Heritage Site, Kizhi Pogost. The eastern shores of the lake contain about 1,200 petroglyphs (rock engravings) dated to the 4th–2nd millennia BC, which have also been inscribed as a UNESCO World Heritage Site. The major cities on the lake are Petrozavodsk, Kondopoga and Medvezhyegorsk.

== Geological history ==
The lake is of glacial-tectonic origin and is a small remnant of a larger body of water which existed in this area during an Ice Age. In geologic terms, the lake is rather young, formed – like almost all lakes in northern Europe – through the carving activity of the inland ice sheets in the latter part of the last ice age, about 12,000 years ago: In the Paleozoic Era (400–300 million years ago) the entire territory of the modern basin of the lake was covered with a shelf sea lying near the ancient, near-equatoric Baltic continent. Sediments at that time – sandstone, sand, clay and limestone – form a 200-metre-thick (660 ft) layer covering the Baltic Shield which consists of granite, gneiss and greenstone. The retreat of the Ice Age glaciers formed the Littorina Sea. Its level was first 7–9 m (23–30 ft) higher than at present, but it gradually lowered, thereby decreasing the sea area and forming several lakes in the Baltic region.

== Topography and hydrography ==
Lake Onega has a surface area of 9,891 km^{2} (3,819 sq mi) without islands and a volume of 291 km^{3} (70 cu mi); its length is about 245 km (152 mi) and width about 90 km (56 mi). It is the second largest lake in Europe, and the 17th largest lake by area in the world. Its southern banks are mostly low and continuous, whereas northern banks are rocky and rugged. They contain numerous elongated bays resulting in the lake's outline appearing similar to a giant crayfish. In the northern part lies the large Zaonezhye Peninsula (Заонежье); south of it, is the Big Klimenetsky (Большой Клименецкий) island. To the west of them lies the deep (deeper than 100 m [330 ft]) Greater Onega (Большое Онего) area containing the Kondopozhskaya (Кондопожская губа, depth up to 78 m [256 ft]), Ilem-Gorskaya (42 m [138 ft]), Lizhemskoy (82 m [269 ft]) and Unitskoy (44 m [144 ft]) bays. To the southwest of Greater Onega lies Petrozavodskoye Onego (Петрозаводское Онего) containing the large Petrozavodsk and small Yalguba and Pinguba bays. To the east of Zaonezhye there is a bay, northern part of which is called Povenetsky Bay and the southern part is Zaonezhsky Bay. There, deep sections alternate with banks and islands which split the bay into several parts. The southernmost part of them, Lesser Onega, is 40–50 m (130–160 ft) deep. All the shores there are rocky.

View on Lake Onega from space, May 2002
The numbers denote: 1. Svirsk Bay; 2. Petrozavodsk Bay and the city Petrozavodsk; 3. Greater Onego Bay; 4. Kondopozhskaya Bay; 5. Lesser Onego Bay; 6. Zaonezhsky Bay; 7. Povenetsky Bay; 8. Kizhi Island; 9. Lake Vodlozero and Vodlozero National Park; 10. Ivinsky Spill and River Svir; 11. Cape Besov Nos ("Devil's nose"); 12. Big Klimenetsky Island

The average depth of the lake is 30 m (98 ft), and the deepest spot of 127 m (417 ft) is located in the northern part. The average depth is 50–60 m (160–200 ft) in the middle and rises to 20–30 m (66–98 ft) in the southern part. The bottom has a very uneven profile, it is covered with silt, and contains numerous trenches of various size and shape in the northern part. The trenches are separated by large shallow banks. Such bottom structure is favorable for fish, and the banks are used for commercial fishing.

The water level is stabilized by the Verhnesvirskaya hydropower plant and varies by only 0.9–1.5 m (2 ft 11 in – 4 ft 11 in) over the year. It rises due to the spring flood which lasts 1 1/2 to 2 months. The highest water level is in June–August and the lowest is in March–April. Rivers bring 15.6 km^{3} (3.7 cu mi) of water per year to the lake, that is up to 74% of the water balance; the rest is provided by precipitation. Most of the lake water (84% or 17.6 km^{3} [4.2 cu mi] per year) outflows via a single river, Svir, and the remaining 16% evaporates from the lake surface. There are frequent storms more characteristic of a sea than a lake; waves of 2–3 metres (6 ft 7 in – 9 ft 10 in) are not uncommon and may even reach 5 m (16 ft). The lake freezes near the coast and bays in late November and December and around mid-January in its center. Thawing starts in April in the tributaries and reaches the lake in May. Water in the deep parts is clear, with the visibility up to 7–8 m (23–26 ft). In the bays, the visibility may decrease to about a meter. The water is fresh, with a salinity of 35 mg/L. This is relatively low for a lake and is about 1 1/2 times lower than in the other large lake of the area, Lake Ladoga.

The maximum surface water temperature is 20–24 °C (68–75 °F) on the open lake and 24–27 °C (75–81 °F) in the bays. The deep waters are much colder, from 2–2.5 °C (36–36 °F) in winter to 4–6 °C (39–43 °F) in summer. Weather is relatively cold, with temperatures below 0 °C (32 °F) for half of the year and average summer temperatures of about 16 °C (61 °F).

== Basin and islands ==
The catchment area of 51,540 km^{2} (19,900 sq mi) drains into the lake via 58 rivers and more than 110 tributaries, including the Shuya, Suna, Vodla, Vytegra and Andoma. The only outgoing Svir, which marks the southern boundary of Karelia, runs from the southwestern shore of Lake Onega to Lake Ladoga and continues as the Neva to the Gulf of Finland.

The White Sea–Baltic Canal runs through the lake from the White Sea to the Baltic Sea. The Volga–Baltic Waterway connects Onega Lake with the Volga, Caspian Sea and Black Sea. The Onega Canal, which follows the southern banks of the lake, was built in 1818–1820 and 1845–1852 between Vytegra in the east and Svir in the west. The canal was part of the Mariinsk Canal System, a forerunner of the Volga–Baltic Waterway, and aimed to create a quiet pass for boats avoiding the stormy waters of the lake. It is around 50 m (160 ft) wide, and lies between 10 m (33 ft) and 2 km (1.2 mi) from the shores of the lake. The canal is not used for active navigation at present.

There are about 1650 islands in the lake with a total area of about 250 km^{2} (97 sq mi). Whereas the most famous is Kizhi, which contains historical wooden churches of the 18th century, the largest island is Big Klimenetsky with an area of 147 km^{2} (57 sq mi). It contains a few settlements, a school and an 82 m (269 ft) hill. Other large islands are Big Lelikovsky and Suysari.

Cape Besov Nos with a lighthouse	Petrozavodsk Bay	Lakeshore	Islands

== Flora and fauna ==
The lake banks are low and are flooded with raising water level. They are therefore swampy and are rich in reed, hosting ducks, geese and swans. The coastal region is covered with dense virgin forests. Major tree types are coniferous, but also common are lime (linden), elm and European alder. Common mammals include elks, brown bears, wolves, red foxes, European hares, blue hares, red squirrels, lynxes, pine martens, European badgers, as well as American muskrats and minks which were introduced to the area in the early 20th century. About 200 bird species from 15 families have been observed in the lake basin.

Lake Onega features a large variety of fish and water invertebrates, including relicts of the glacial period such as lamprey. There are about 47 fish species from 13 families; they include sturgeon, landlocked salmon, brown trout, European smelt, grayling, roaches, Crucian carp, whitefishes, char, pike, European cisco, common dace, silver bream, carp bream, sabre carp, spined loach, wels catfish, European eel, rudd, ide, gudgeon, pike-perch, European perch, ruffe and burbot.

== Ecology ==
The lake area used to be clean but pollution is gradually increasing, especially in the northwestern and northern parts which contain the industrial facilities of Petrozavodsk, Kondopoga and Medvezhyegorsk. About 80% of the population and more than 90% of industry of the basin are concentrated in these areas. The pollution from these three cities amount to about 190 million cubic metres (6.7 billion cubic feet) of sewage and drainage water and 150 tonnes (170 short tons) of emissions per year. Human activity results in about 315 million cubic metres (11.1 billion cubic feet) of drain water per year, of which 46% are industrial and household water, 25% is stormwater runoff and 16% is melioration-related drainage. This drainage contains 810 tonnes (890 tons) of phosphorus and 17,000 tonnes (19,000 tons) of nitrogen; 280 and 11,800 tonnes (310 and 13,010 tons) respectively of these elements are removed through the River Svir whereas the rest accumulates in the lake. Ships and motor boats (about 8,000 units) bring oil pollution at the level of about 830 tonnes (910 tons) per navigation year, as well as phenols (500 kg [1,100 lb]), lead (100 kg [220 lb]) and oxides of sulfur, nitrogen, and carbon.

== Economy ==
The lake basin is a major source of granite, marble and black schist in Russia which have been exploited in the area since the early 18th century. Also advanced is metallurgy, especially in the Petrozavodsk area which produces about 25% of industrial products of Karelia. Water level of the lake is controlled by the Nizhnesvirskaya (Нижнесвирская ГЭС, "Lower Svir") and Verkhnesvirskaya (Верхнесвирская ГЭС, "Upper Svir") hydroelectric power plants. The former was built between 1927 and 1938 and has a peak power of 99 MW. The construction of Verkhnesvirskaya plant started in 1938, but was interrupted by World War II and could only be resumed in 1947. The plant was completed in 1952 and provided 160 MW of electric power. The associated with the plant Verkhnesvirsk Reservoir has an area of 9,930 km^{2} (3,830 sq mi) and volume of 260 km^{3} (62 cu mi), i.e. almost the same as those of Onega Lake. Its construction raised the water level of the lake by 0.5 m (20 in).

The lake contains a well-developed navigation system which is part of the Volga–Baltic Waterway and White Sea – Baltic Canal, connecting the basins of Baltic, Caspian and the northern seas. These canals allow water transport of goods from the lake to the countries from Germany to Iran; most traffic goes to Finland, Sweden, Germany and Denmark. The Onega Canal running along the southern shore of the lake there is not used at present. Cargo on Lake Onega amounts to 10–12 million tonnes per year with about 10,300 ship voyages. Lake shores contain two ports (Petrozavodsk and Medvezhyegorsk), 5 wharves (Kondopoga, Povenets, Shala, Vytegra and Ascension (Вознесенье)) and 41 piers.

Fishery is an important activity on the lake. About 17 species are being fished commercially, mostly European cisco, smelt, whitefishes, roaches, burbot, pike-perch, perch, ruffe, carp bream, lake salmon, pike and somewhat less ide, graylings, common dace, common bleak and crucian carp.

Whereas there is no regular passenger service on the lake, there are several tourist trips per day along the routes of Petrozavodsk–Kizhi, Petrozavodsk–Velikaya Guba and Petrozavodsk–Shala. They are run by hydrofoil and motor ships and are used for passenger transport as well. In addition, passenger ships go on the route Petrozavodsk – Shala.

Sailing is a popular activity on the lake and there is a sailing club in Petrozavodsk. Since 1972, every year at the end of July the lake has hosted the largest regatta in Russia ("Онежская парусная регата") which is the Russian Open Championship in the Russian class of Cruisers Yachts "Open800". The regatta has international status.

Boats on the wharf "Kizhi"	The cargo port of Petrozavodsk	Petrozavodsk in 1915

== History and places ==
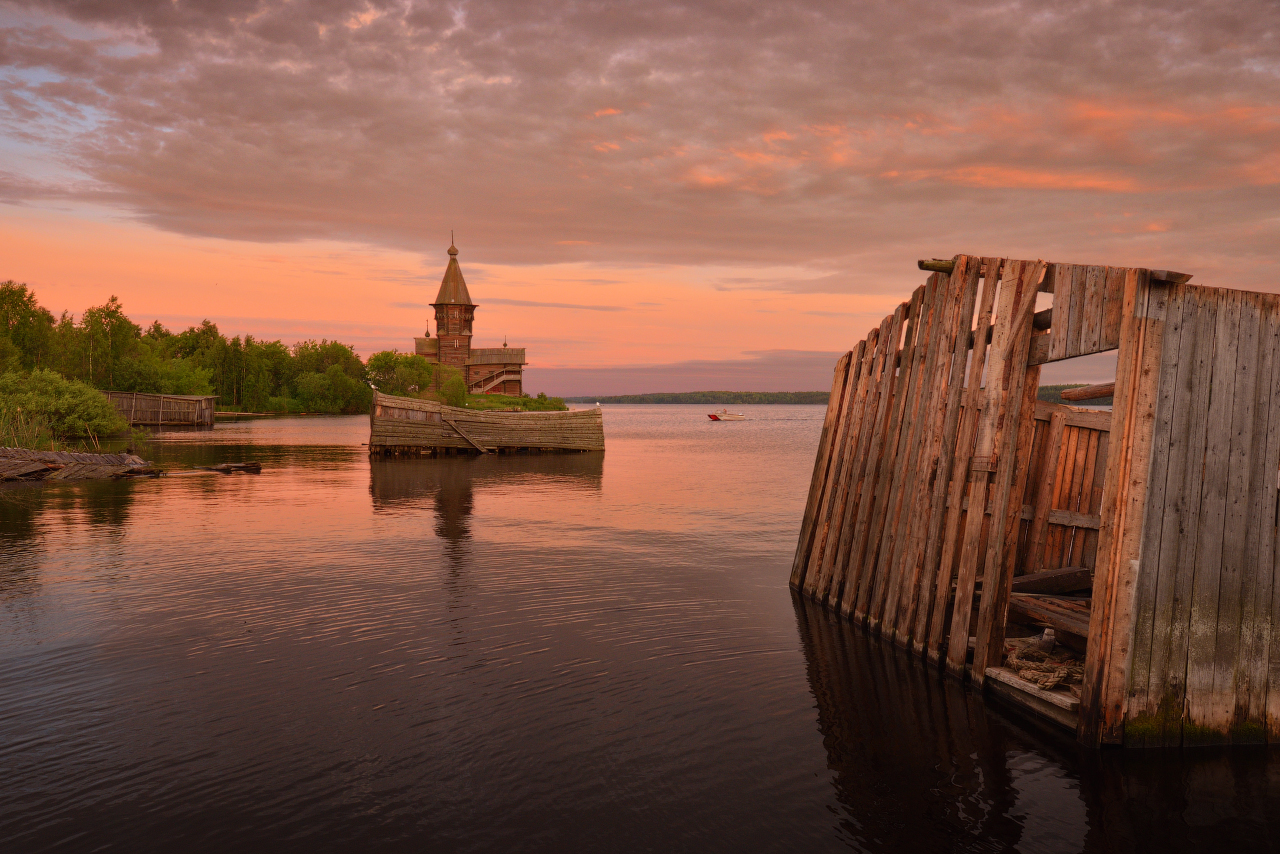
The Dormition Church in Kondopoga before its destruction by an arsonist in 2018

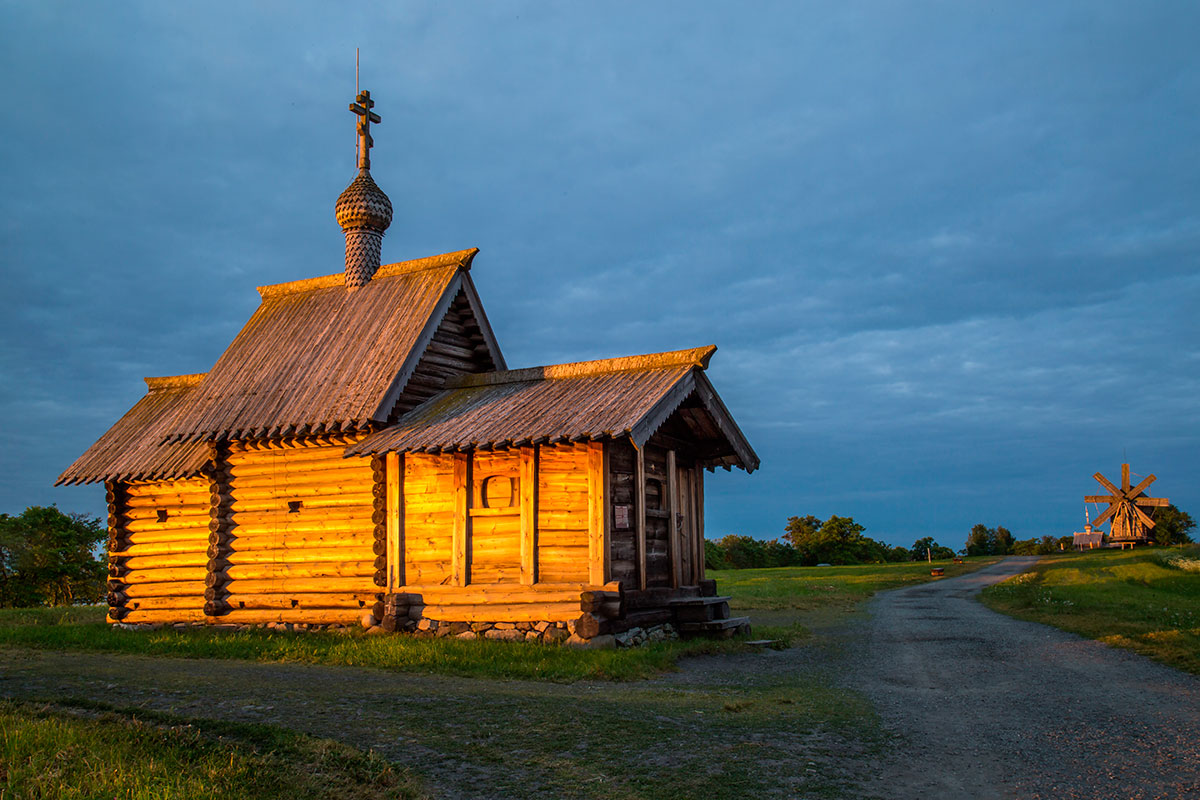
A 14th-century wooden church from the Muromsky Monastery (considered to be the oldest wooden building in Russia)

=== Cities ===
The largest city on the lake is Petrozavodsk – the capital of Republic of Karelia (about 270,000 citizens) – founded in 1703 by Peter I to exploit the natural ore deposits. The city contains several remarkable Neoclassical buildings from Catherine II's reign, including the Circular Square and a gymnasium building (built in 1790). The embankment of Lake Onega contains a series of sculptures, many of which were presented as gifts from the twin cities.

Kondopoga has been known since 1495 and (before its destruction in 2018) contained the Uspenskaya (Assumption) Church from 1774. This 42-metre-tall (138 ft) edifice was the tallest wooden church of the Russian North. There are two carillons in the city, with 23 and 18 bells, also there is an indoor ice sports arena accommodating 1,850 spectators and a Palace of Arts with an organ.

The town of Medvezhyegorsk was founded in 1916 and from 1931 became the construction base of the White Sea – Baltic Canal. Between 1703–1710 and 1766–1769 a factory was operating on the site of the city. During the World War II this area was occupied by the Finnish forces and was a place of busy military activities.

=== Kizhi island ===
The main attraction of the lake is the island of Kizhi in the northern part of the lake, which is a State Historical, Architectural and Ethnographic Preservation Area. There are 89 wooden architectural monuments of the 15th to 20th centuries on the island. The most remarkable of those is Kizhi Pogost of the early 18th century which consists of a summer church with 22 domes, a winter church with nine domes, and a belfry. The pogost was included in the list of UNESCO World Heritage sites in 1990. In the summer, there are daily boat connections to the island from Petrozavodsk.

=== Onega petroglyphs ===
Another attraction of the lake are the Onega petroglyphs (rock engravings). They are located on the eastern coast of the lake and date back to between the 4th and 2nd millennia BC. There are about 1,200 petroglyphs scattered over the 20 km (12 mi) area including several capes, such as Besov Nos (see map above). The engravings are 1–2 mm (0.04–0.08 in) deep and depict animals, people, boats and geometrical shapes of circular and crescent shapes.

In 2021, the petroglyphs were inscribed on the UNESCO World Heritage List for its significant artistic qualities that testify the creativity of the Stone Age.

=== Others ===
Many other historical monuments are scattered around the lake. They include the Dormition Monastery (ru) on the cape Muromsky, on the eastern shore of the lake. The monastery was founded in 1350, closed in 1918 and revived in 1991.
