= Kizhi Island =

Island in Republic of Karelia, Russia

Kizhi
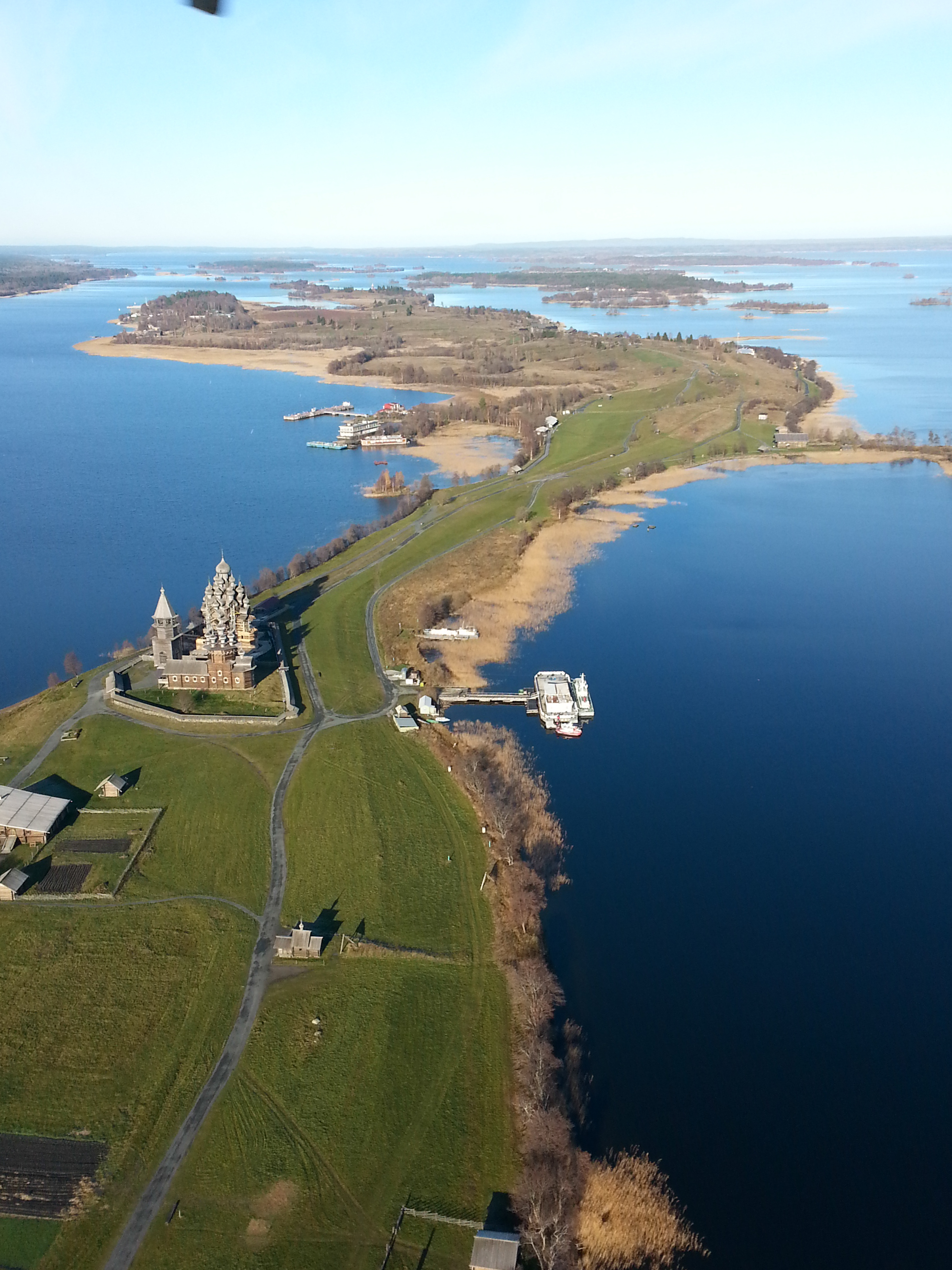

- Location within Karelia Location within European Russia Location within Europe

Geography
- Location: Russia
- Coordinates: 62.083°N 35.217°E
- Area: 5 km^{2} (1.9 sq mi)
- Length: 6 km (3.7 mi)
- Width: 1 km (0.6 mi)

Administration
- Russia

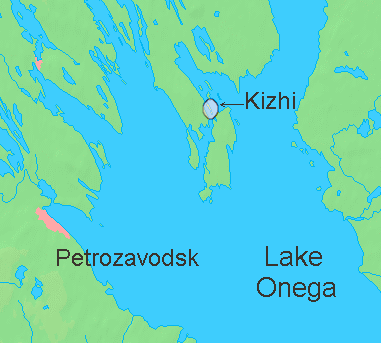
Kizhi Islands as shown on a map of northern Lake Onega. Petrozavodsk is also highlighted.

Kizhi (Russian: Кижи, IPA: [ˈkʲiʐɨ]; Karelian: Kiži) is an island near the geometrical center of Lake Onega in the Republic of Karelia (Medvezhyegorsky District), Russia. It is elongated from north to south and is about 6 kilometres (3.7 mi) long, 1 kilometre (0.62 mi) wide and is about 68 kilometres (42 mi) away from the capital of Karelia, Petrozavodsk.

Settlements and churches on the island were known from at least the 15th century. The population was rural, but was forced by the government to assist development of the ore mining and iron plants in the area that resulted in a major Kizhi Uprising in 1769–1771. Most villages had disappeared from the island by the 1950s and now only a small rural settlement remains. In the 18th century, two major churches and a bell tower were built on the island, which are now known as Kizhi Pogost. In the 1950s, dozens of historical wooden buildings were moved to the island from various parts of Karelia for preservation purposes. Nowadays, the entire island and the nearby area form a national open-air museum with more than 80 historical wooden structures. The most famous is the Kizhi Pogost, which is a UNESCO World Heritage site.

== History ==
=== Name ===
The name Kizhi is believed to originate from ancient Veps or Karelian word "kizhat" or "kizhansuari" ("social gathering" or "island of games"). In Russian, it can be pronounced with stress on either syllable; the stress on the ultimate syllable is grammatically incorrect in Karelian language.

=== Industrial development ===
Since at least the 14th century, the island was part of the exchange route between Novgorod and White Sea. The numerous settlements on Kizhi and neighboring islands (about 100 by the 16th century) comprised an administrative entity called Spas-Kizhi Pogost. Since the 13th and 14th century, the area acquired economical importance as a source of iron ores. By the early 18th century, as a consequence of the industrial reforms of Tzar Peter I, several ore mines and metallurgy plants were built on the Onega Lake, in particular on the place of modern Medvezhyegorsk and Petrozavodsk cities. Those plants required hard physical labor such as cutting forests for wood, coal burning, ground works, etc., which was mostly provided by the local peasants. The labor was forced; disobedience was punished by public beating and fines that sparked local riots. The largest one occurred in 1769–1771 and is known as the Kizhi Uprising; it was sparked by a governor's order to send peasants during the harvest season for works at Tivdiysk marble mine and construction of the Lizhemsky metallurgical plant. Peasants disobeyed and boycotted the order. They were soon joined by up to 40,000 people from all over Karelia, led by Kliment Sobolev, Andrei Salnikov and Semen Kostin. The revolt was based in the Kizhi Pogost which resulted in its name. The peasants sent petitioners to St. Petersburg, but the petitioners were arrested and punished, and a military corps was sent to suppress the uprising. They arrived to Kizhi by the end of June, 1771, and after artillery fire the peasants quickly surrendered. The leaders and 50–70 other peasants were publicly beaten and sent into exile in Siberia. Many others were forced into military service, which was a form of punishment of the time. However, at this point the recruitment of peasants for the construction of local plants and mineworks stopped.

=== Farming and other traditional activities ===
From the early times, the most important occupation of the islanders was farming. All available area, about half of the island was converted to fields; of the remaining half, a quarter was rocky and the rest occupied by swamps. On one occasion in the 18th century, two villages were moved from Kizhi island to the nearby infertile mainland to free land for farming. Until 1970, the island had about 96 hectares (240 acres) of fields yielding various grains and potato, using combine harvesters and tractors for field cultivation. The farming was stopped in 1971 by a government directive. Some fields were reconstructed in 2004 as part of the Kizhi museum. Those fields are an exhibit demonstrating major steps of the farming and harvesting work.

Other traditional activities of the area included embroidery, making beaded jewelry, weaving (including traditional birch bark weaving), knitting, spinning, woodcarving (which included making traditional Russian wooden toys) and pottery.

=== Original churches of Kizhi ===
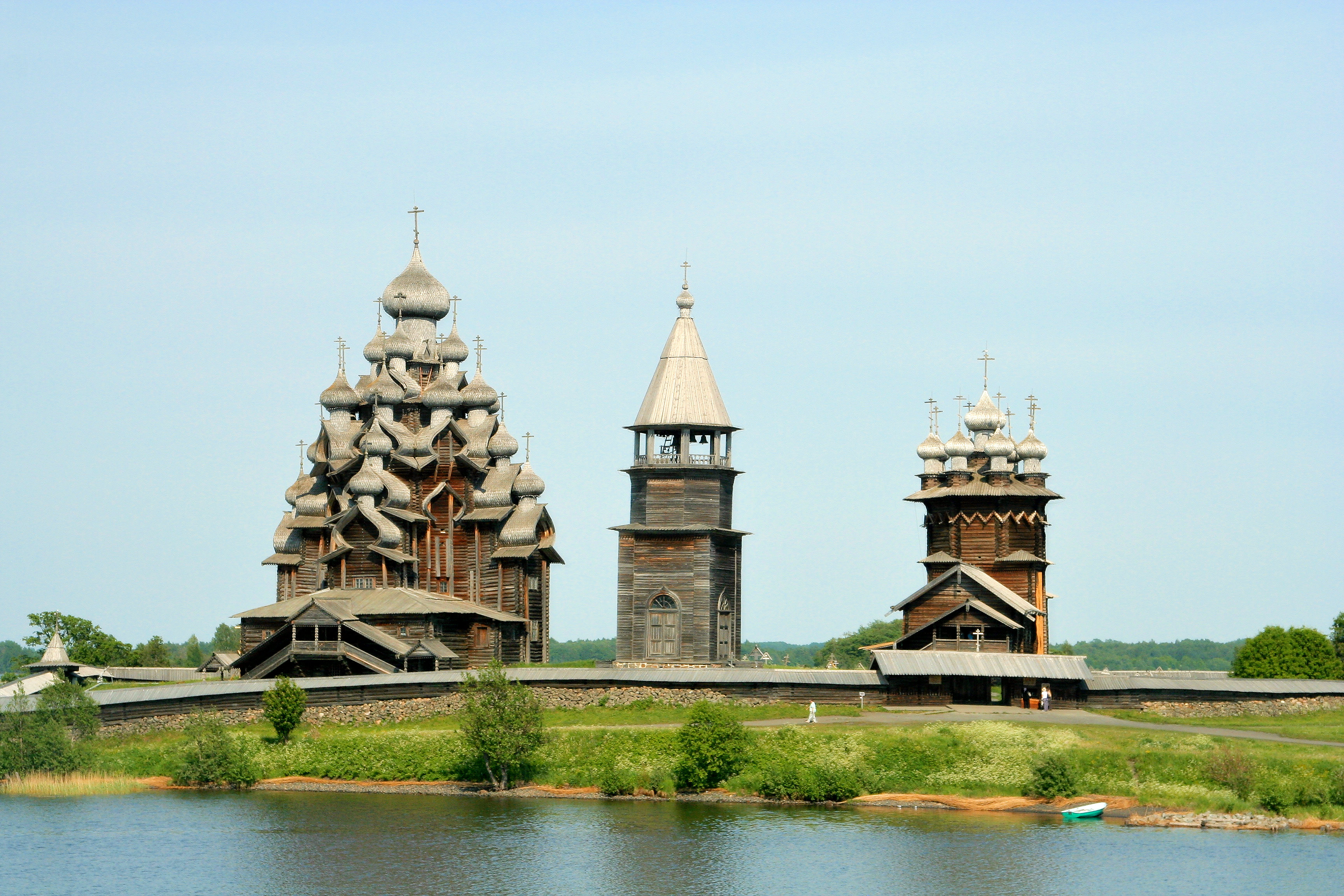
The 22-dome Transfiguration Church

The first mention of churches on the island is dated to 1563. This document describes two domed wooden churches with a bell tower standing in the southern part of the island (on the site of the present Kizhi Pogost), and mentions their earlier description of 1496. A more detailed description was documented in 1628. In particular, contrary to the later, domed churches of the pogost, the first ones had pyramidal roofs. Those churches were burned by a fire caused by lightning in the end of the 17th century. The first church raised after the fire was the Church of the Intercession (Russian: церковь Покрова Богородицы, 1694) which was heated and held services all year long. It was reconstructed several times in 1720–1749 and in 1764 it was rebuilt into its present 9-dome design. In 1714, the 22-dome Transfiguration Church (Russian: Церковь Преображения Господня) was constructed and soon after the bell tower was added, thereby completing the Kizhi Pogost. The bell tower was entirely rebuilt in 1862. Much earlier, some time in the 17th century, a 300 metres (980 ft) long fence was built around the churches, which then served as a protection ground against Swedish and Polish incursions.

The Kizhi churches were built on stones, without a deep foundation. Their major basic structural unit is a round log of Scots pine (Pinus sylvestris) about 30 centimetres (12 in) in diameter and 3 to 5 metres (9.8 to 16.4 ft) long. Many thousands of logs were brought for construction from the mainland which was a complex logistical task at that time. The logs were cut and shaped with axes and assembled without nails, using interlocking corner joinery — either round notch or dovetail. Flat roofs were made of spruce planks and the domes are covered in aspen.

== Kizhi museum ==
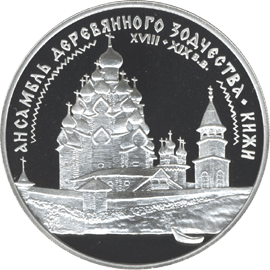
The ensemble of wooden architecture in Kizhi as depicted on a memorial 3-ruble coin of the Central Bank of Russia (1995).

Open-air museum Kizhi is one of the first in Russia, which started functioning on the island in 1951 and currently contains about 87 wooden constructions. The most famous of them is the Kizhi Pogost, which contains two churches and a bell tower surrounded by a fence. The pogost was included in the UNESCO World Heritage list in 1990. Since 1951, a large number of historical buildings were moved to the island. They include Church of the Resurrection of Lazarus from Murom Monastery, which is regarded as the oldest remaining wooden church in Russia (second half of the 14th century), several bell towers, more than 20 peasant houses, mills, barns and saunas. In 1993, the museum was included into a short list a Russian Cultural Heritage sites. The museum contains more than 41,000 exhibits. Most of them are domestic artifacts: tools, dishes, utensils, furniture, etc. There are about 1000 icons of the 16th–19th centuries which includes Russia's only collection of "heavens". There are also church items, such as crosses early manuscript of 17th–19th centuries. The museum also contains exhibits of the 20th century, about 10,000 photographs and 1,500 drawings.

The museum conducts a wide range of scientific studies in the history, archeology, ecology, nature and other fields related to the island. It is based in Kizhi and Petrozavodsk, has an advanced web portal and a web camera on the island. Kizhi museum also publishes the monthly "Kizhi newspaper". In summer, it runs week-long education courses at the school and university level.

=== Church of the Resurrection of Lazarus ===
Tradition says that the church was built by the monk Lazarus (1286 (?) – 1391) in the second half of the 14th century. The church became the first building of the future Murom Monastery located on the eastern shore of Lake Onega. Over time, the church became the main attractions of the monastery as it was reputed to miraculously cure illnesses. Clergy announced the monk Lazarus as a local saint, and every summer, on 23–24 June, the church was attracting pilgrims. The building is 3 metres (9.8 ft) tall and has a perimeter of 9 by 3 metres (29.5 ft × 9.8 ft). The original two-tier iconostasis of the church is preserved; it consists of 17 icons of 16th–18th centuries.

=== Chapel of the Archangel Michael ===
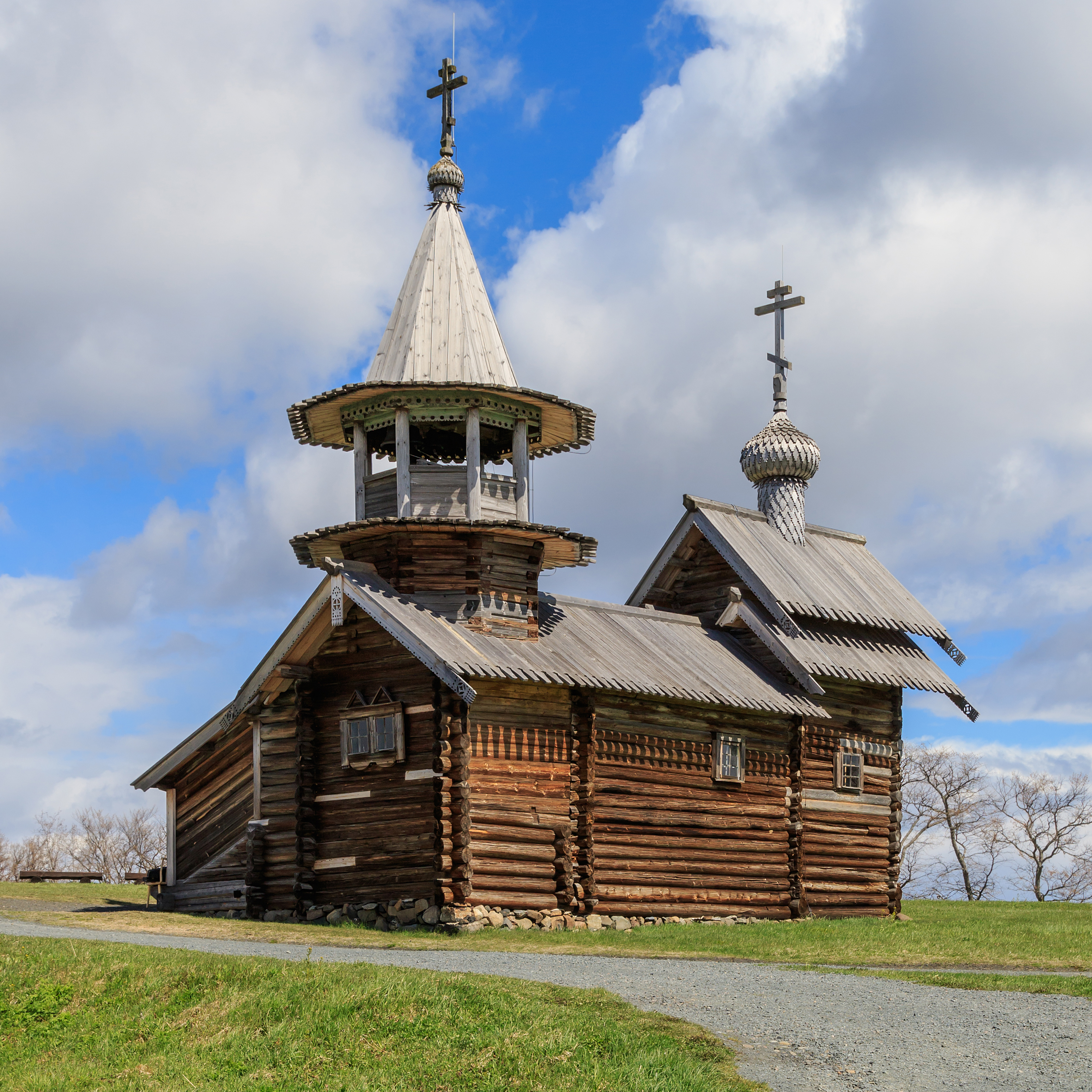
Chapel of the Archangel Michael

The Chapel of the Archangel Michael was moved to Kizhi in 1961 from the Lelikozero village. It measures 12 by 3 by 11 metres (39.4 ft × 9.8 ft × 36.1 ft) and has a rectangular frame elongated from east to west and a two-slope roof. Above the entrance hall there is a belfry capped with a pyramid roof. The iconostasis of the chapel has two tiers and contains icons of 17th–18th centuries.

== Demography ==
By the end of the 16th century, there were 14 settlements on the island. By the early 1900s, their number reduced to nine, which were named Pogost, Bachurino, Bishevo, Bosarevo, Vasilyevo, Kyazhevo, Morozovo, Navolok and Yamka. By the end of World War II, seven of them disappeared and only Vasilyevo and Yamka remain. They are a part of the "Kizhi rural settlement" belonging to the larger Velikogubskoe rural settlement of Medvezhyegorsky District, Republic of Karelia, Russia.

== Settlements ==
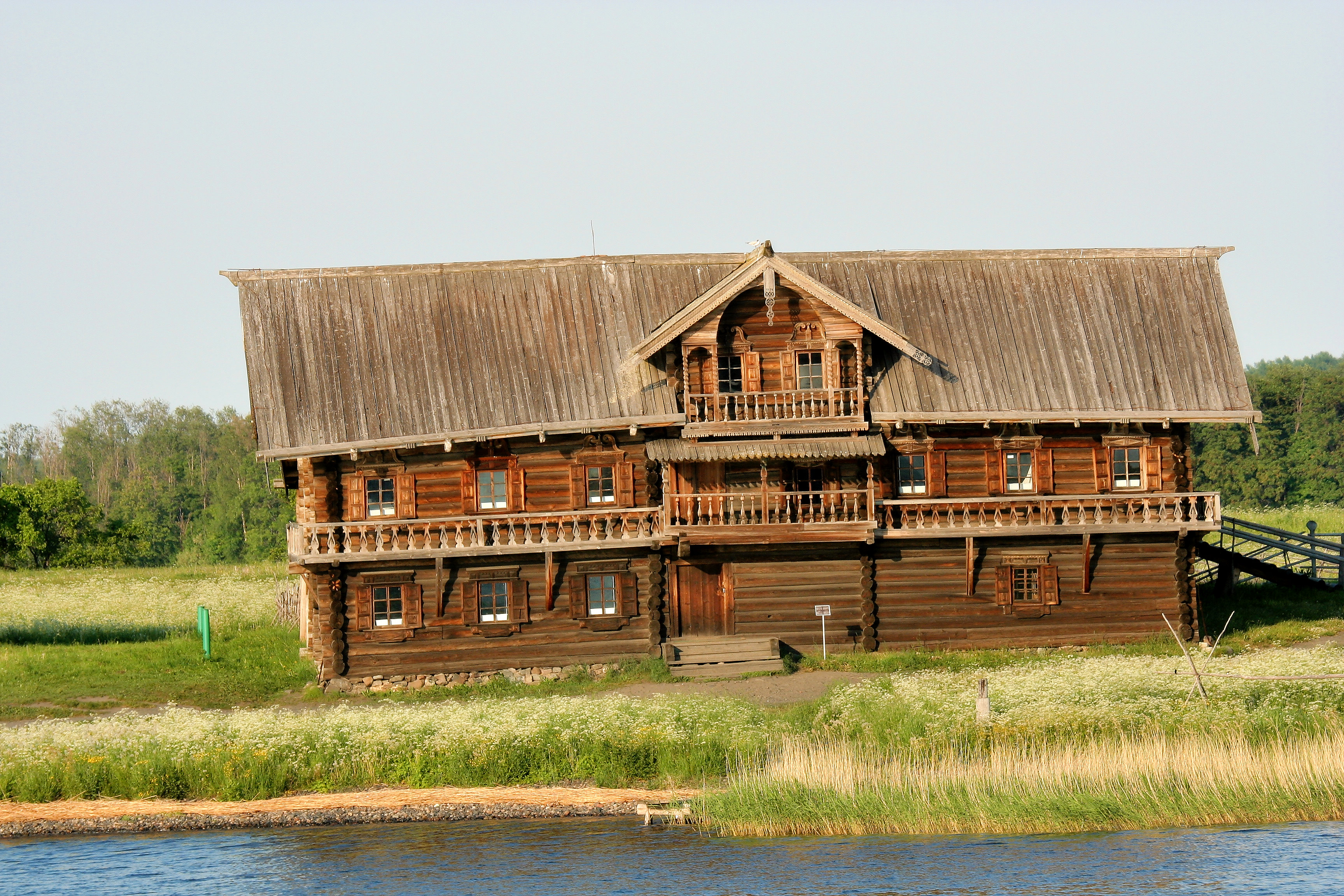
A farm house

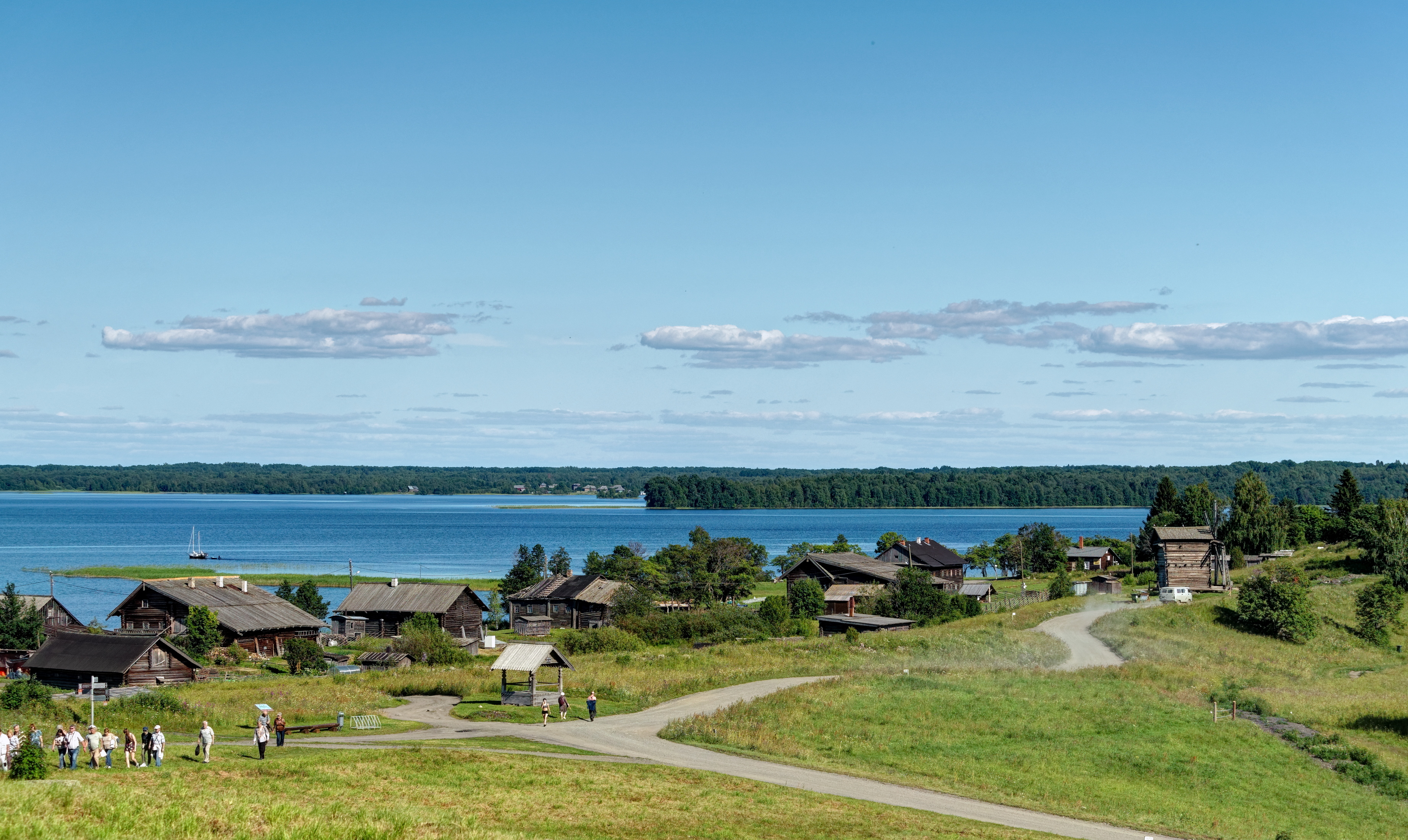
Kizhi island settlement

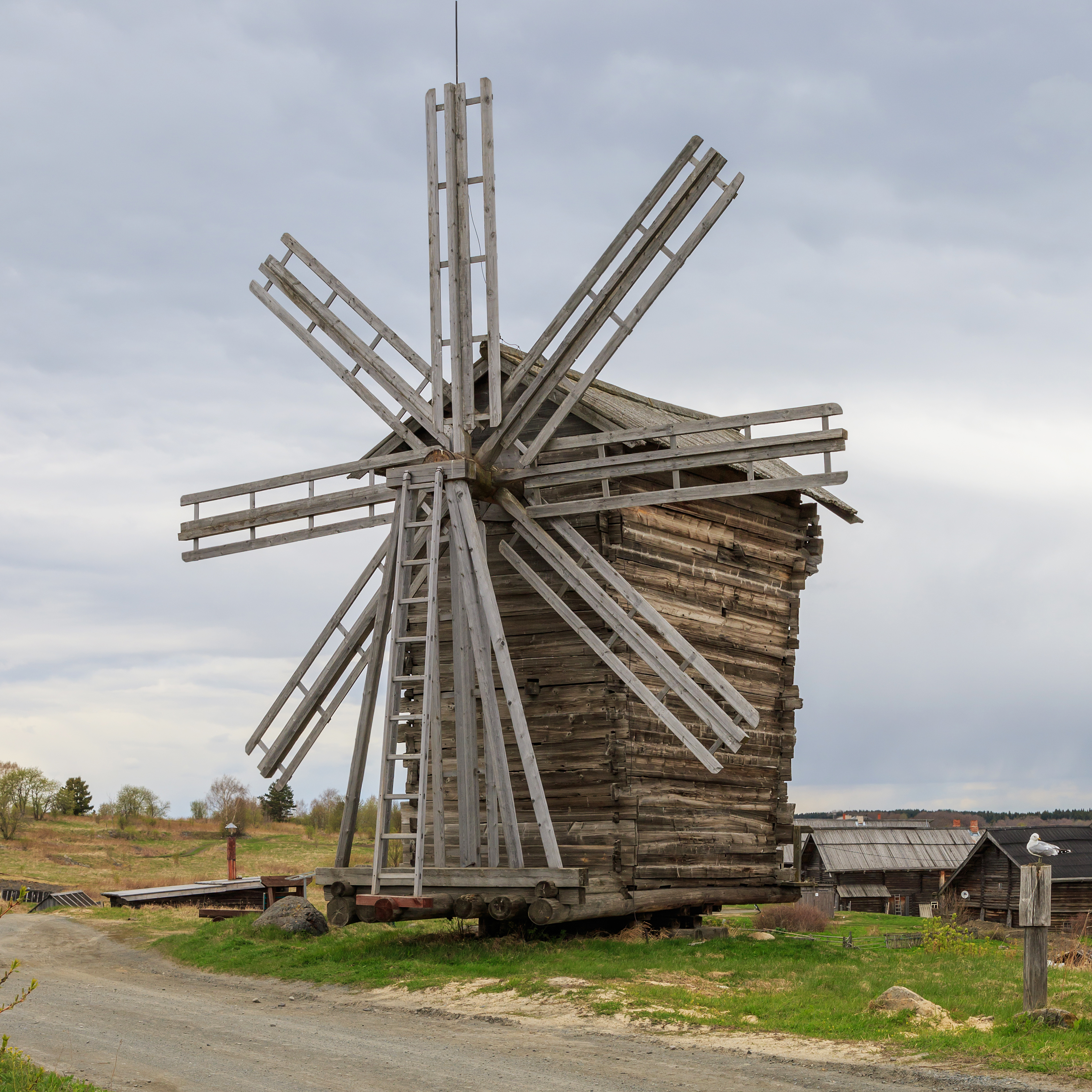
Windmill built in 1930, Yamka

The pogost settlement is located near the Kizhi Pogost. It was first mentioned in the early 17th century; then it consisted of four houses, two of which were burned down during a local revolt. By 1678, the number of houses increased to seven, six of which belonged to the Pogost priests and one to a peasant. The settlement shrank to five houses by the early 1900s and disappeared by 1950. Nowadays, on their place stands a historical house of Oshevnev, which was moved here in 1951 from Oshevnevo village, and which became the first exhibit of the Kizhi museum opened in 1960.

Bachurino was named after a peasant Fedor Bachurin; between the 17th and 19th centuries, it contained only two houses which then grew to three. This settlement was the poorest on the island – in 1876, it owned only one horse and two cows, and in the early 20th century, only two cows for 24 people living there.

Bishevo settlement was located in the north-eastern part of the island. In 1563, it had one house but there were four houses there by 1678. In 1820, from eight men of the settlement, six were wealthy – the settlement had 5 horses, 11 cows and 4 sheep. In the early 1900s, there were only 4 horses and 3 cows for 11 people, and by 1950 the settlement had disappeared.

Bosarevo settlement was formed in 1858-1869 with one house of 11 people, which became two by 1911.

Kyazehvo settlement was located on the northernmost shore of the island and had two houses in 1563. One more was built by 1876, but the houses were small and had almost no animals. Thirteen people lived there by 1905.

Morozovo settlement was known since 1582 and contained one big house which was taken apart in 1950. Nearby, there is the Chapel of the Three Saints. It stands 22 metres tall with a perimeter of 8 by 12 metres (26 ft × 39 ft) and was built in the late 18th century in the Kavgora village.

Navolok settlement was one of the largest and richest in the area with four houses in 1563 and seven from 1696. About 40 people lived there in the 19th century, most of whom were peasants but two were shoe makers and one carpenter. The settlement had a boat which was used for cargo.

While most Kizhi settlements were shrinking with time, Vasilyevo was growing from one house in 1840 to two in 1876, three in 1911 and five in 2009. Of the present five houses, two are original and others were moved here as museum exhibits. Near them, there is a historical Chapel of the Assumption of the Virgin (Russian: часовня Успения Пресвятой Богородицы) of 17th–18th century measuring 13 by 6 by 17 metres (43 ft × 20 ft × 56 ft).

Yamka settlement had two houses in 1563, both of which were burned down in 1616. They were rebuilt later and by 1911, the settlement was the largest on the island with 11 houses. One of its inhabitants, Semen Kostin, was a leader of the Kizhi Uprising of the 1769. One of his neighbors became a wealthy merchant and a regular donor to the reconstruction of the Kizhi churches. Apart from historical houses and barns, in Yamka there is a windmill built in 1930 and two chapels. The Chapel of Spas (Russian: Часовня Спаса Нерукотворного) measures 13 by 3 by 8 metres (42.7 ft × 9.8 ft × 26.2 ft). It was built in the 17th–18th centuries in Vigovo village and moved to Kizhi in the 1950s. Its style is similar to that of the Chapel of the Archangel Michael (see above). The Chapel of Petr and Pavel is smaller (5 by 3 by 3 metres (16.4 ft × 9.8 ft × 9.8 ft)) and simpler in design. It was built in the early 18th century in the Tipinitsa village and then moved to Kizhi. Its interior could not be preserved.

== Geography and nature ==
=== Geology, flora and fauna ===
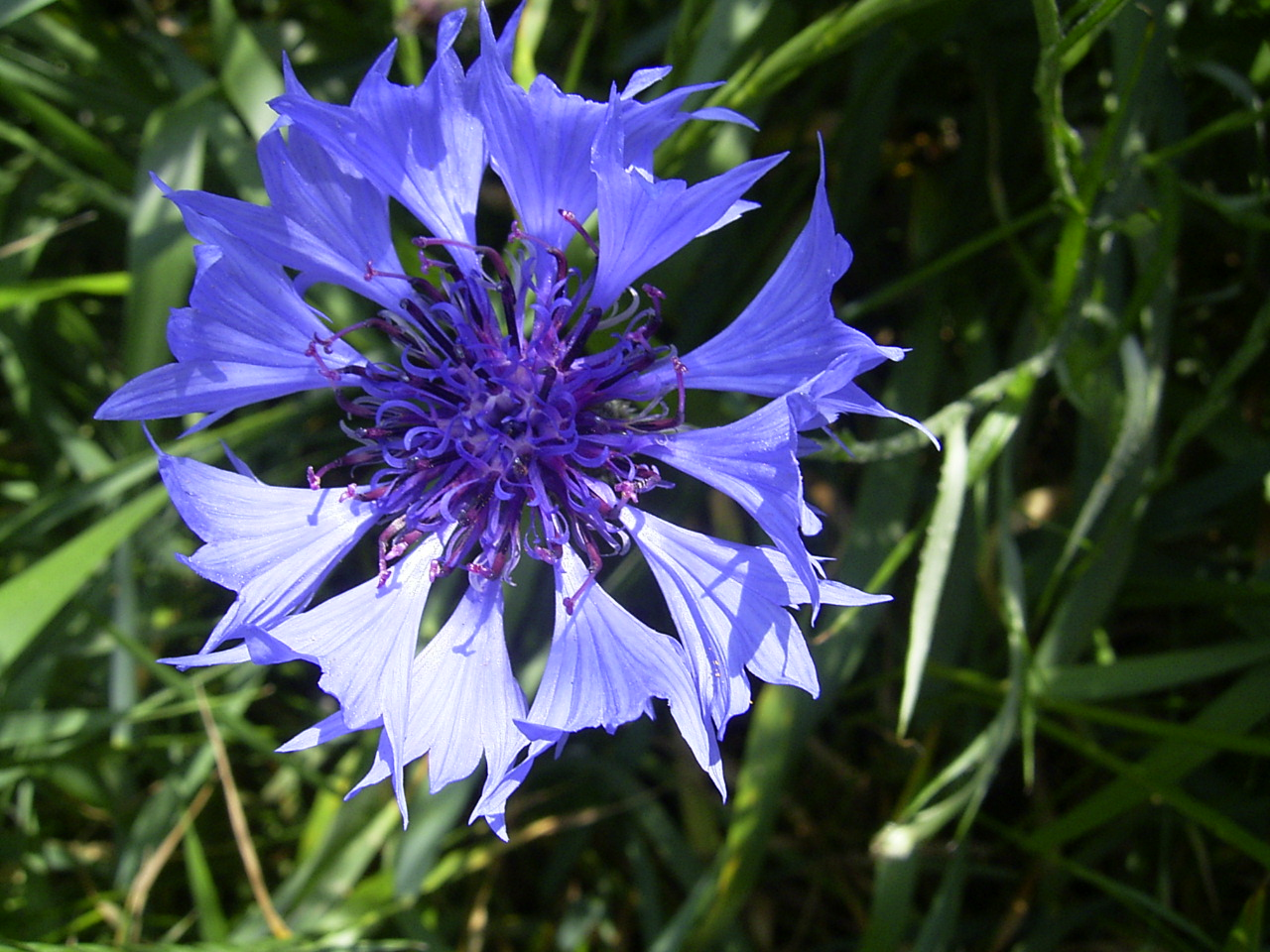
Cornflower (Centaurea cyanus)

The area of Kizhi island differs from most of other parts of Onega Lake. It is characterized by numerous small islands, which reduce the water flow, and relatively shallow and uneven lake bottom. Whereas the average depth of the lake is 31 metres (102 ft), the depth is about 2–3 metres (6 ft 7 in – 9 ft 10 in) in the Kizhi and only in some places reaches 16–20 metres (52–66 ft). Because of the weak flows and shallow depth, water is relatively warm and quiet that promotes growth of aquatic vegetation. Fish types include roach, some gobies, crucian carp, sabre carp, perch, ruffe, pike, common dace, silver bream, Ide, gudgeon, carp bream, spined loach, European smelt, char, pike-perch, rudd and burbot.

Along the center of the island runs a narrow ridge, which is a remnant of the ice age. It has steep slopes in some parts and is up to 22 metres (72 ft) tall. There are no forests on the island, but only individual trees of elm, spruce, pine, birch, aspen and alder. The trees host about 28 species of polypores (tree mushrooms), and there are more than 100 species of moss. Most of the island is covered in meadows, which are quite varied and rich in colors and species, including rare and protected. A large part of them are of legume family. Common are cow parsley, various species centaurea, tansy and verbascum densiflorum.

About 180 bird species from 15 families are known in the Kizhi area, and about 45 types of them were observed on the island. Most of them are migratory and stop on the island either for rest or nesting, such as swans, geese, ducks, lake seagulls, sterna, but there are also more stationary birds like house sparrow, Eurasian siskin, common chaffinch, skylark, jackdaw and crow. Among animals and amphibians, there are only newts (smooth newt and great crested newt), vipers, common lizard, frogs and toads (common frog, common toad and moor frog) and mice – the island is too small for larger animals which are abundant in the area.

=== Climate ===
The climate on the island is typical of the area, but is cold for most parts of the world. Low temperatures suppress bacterial activity, which is one of the major factors behind the longevity of the wooden structures of Kizhi.

Climate data for Kizhi
Month	Jan	Feb	Mar	Apr	May	Jun	Jul	Aug	Sep	Oct	Nov	Dec	Year
Mean daily maximum °C (°F)	−7 (19)	−6 (21)	0 (32)	5 (41)	12 (54)	17 (63)	20 (68)	18 (64)	12 (54)	5 (41)	0 (32)	−3 (27)	6 (43)
Mean daily minimum °C (°F)	−13 (9)	−13 (9)	−8 (18)	−2 (28)	3 (37)	7 (45)	10 (50)	9 (48)	5 (41)	1 (34)	−3 (27)	−9 (16)	−1 (30)
Average precipitation mm (inches)	20 (0.8)	20 (0.8)	15 (0.6)	15 (0.6)	20 (0.8)	35 (1.4)	45 (1.8)	55 (2.2)	45 (1.8)	40 (1.6)	35 (1.4)	30 (1.2)	375 (15)
Source: Kizhi climate

=== Access ===
Although Kizhi island is within a kilometer distance from major islands and peninsulas of Onega lake, there are no major cities and transport routes nearby. Access to Kizhi is provided by hydrofoil (several trips a day from Petrozavodsk during the summer months), cruise ship, helicopter and snowcat (in the winter). Transportation over the island is mostly on foot. During the winter, snowmobiles are also used. On nearby islands there are several guesthouses. There is an 8-room (20 beds) wooden guest house and a restaurant on the island.
