= Medvezhyegorsky District =

Medvezhyegorsky District Медвежьегорский район (Russian)
- District
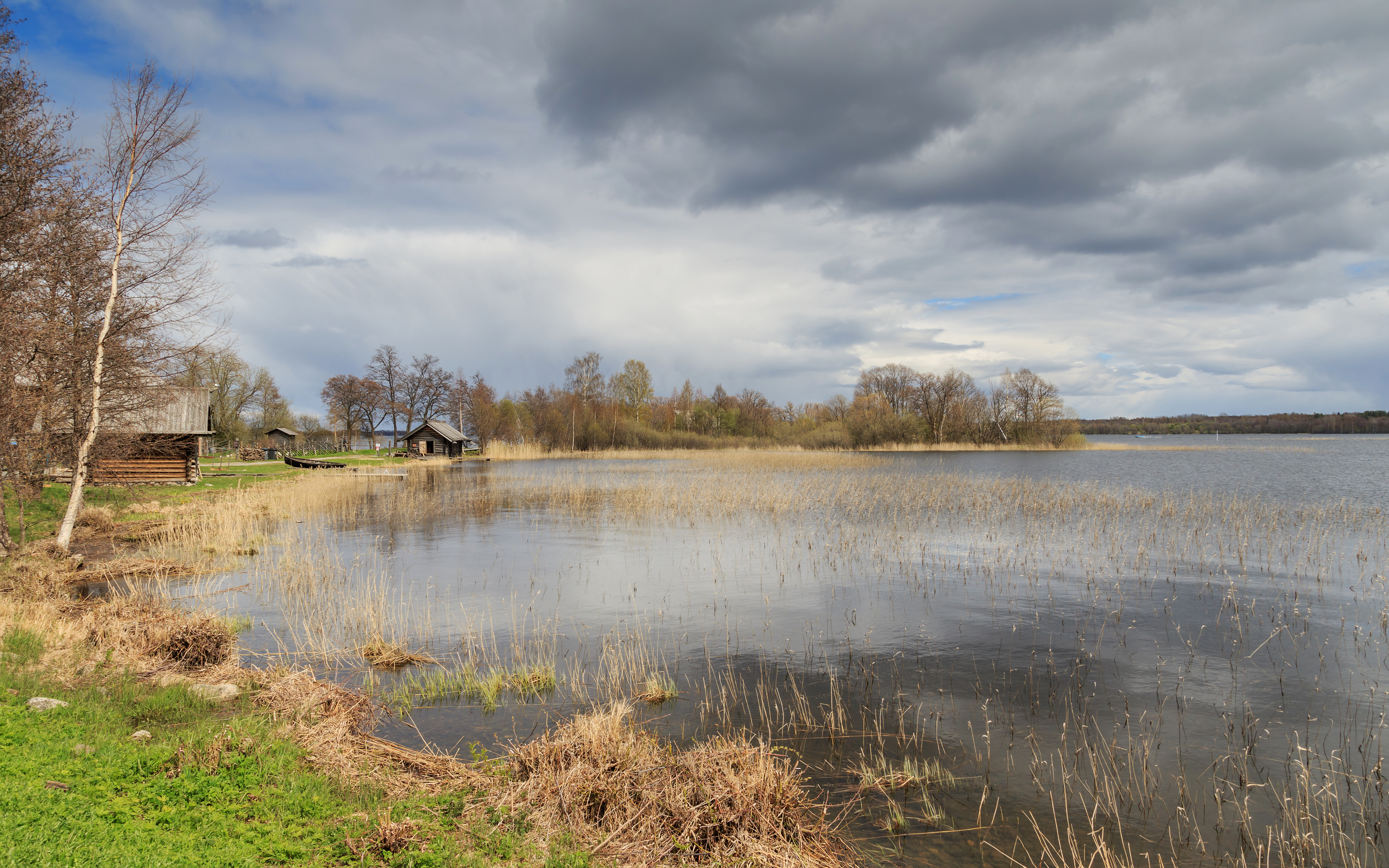
- Kizhi Island, a protected area of Russia in Medvezhyegorsky District

- Flag Coat of arms
- Location of Medvezhyegorsky District in the Republic of Karelia
- Coordinates: 62°54′N 34°28′E
- Country: Russia
- Federal subject: Republic of Karelia
- Established: 29 August 1927
- Administrative center: Medvezhyegorsk

Area
  - Total: 13,696 km^{2} (5,288 sq mi)

Population (2010 Census)
  - Total: 31,864
  - Density: 2.3265/km^{2} (6.0257/sq mi)
  - Urban: 70.1%
  - Rural: 29.9%

Administrative structure
  - Inhabited localities: 1 cities/towns, 2 urban-type settlements, 144 rural localities

Municipal structure
  - Municipally incorporated as: Medvezhyegorsky Municipal District
  - Municipal divisions: 3 urban settlements, 6 rural settlements
- Time zone: UTC+3 (UTC+03:00)
- OKTMO ID: 86624000
- Website: http://amsu.medgora-rayon.ru

Population of Medvezhyegorsky District
- 2010 Census: 31,864
- 2002 Census: 38,388
- 1989 Census: 47,301
- 1979 Census: 48,438

Medvezhyegorsky District (Russian: Медвежьего́рский райо́н; Karelian: Karhumäjen piiri) is an administrative district (raion), one of the fifteen in the Republic of Karelia, Russia. It is located in the southeast of the republic. The area of the district is 13,696 square kilometers (5,288 sq mi). Its administrative center is the town of Medvezhyegorsk. As of the 2010 Census, the total population of the district was 31,864, with the population of Medvezhyegorsk accounting for 48.7% of that number.

== Administrative and municipal status ==
Within the framework of administrative divisions, Medvezhyegorsky District is one of the fifteen in the Republic of Karelia and has administrative jurisdiction over 1 town (Medvezhyegorsk), 2 urban-type settlements (Pindushi and Povenets), and 144 rural localities. As a municipal division, the district is incorporated as Medvezhyegorsky Municipal District. The town, the 2 urban-type settlements, and 28 rural localities are incorporated into 3 urban settlements, while the remaining 116 rural localities are incorporated into 6 rural settlements within the municipal district. The town of Medvezhyegorsk serves as the administrative center of both the administrative and municipal district.
