= Medvezhyegorsk =

Town in the Republic of Karelia, Russia

Medvezhyegorsk Медвежьегорск Karhumägi (Karelian)
- Town
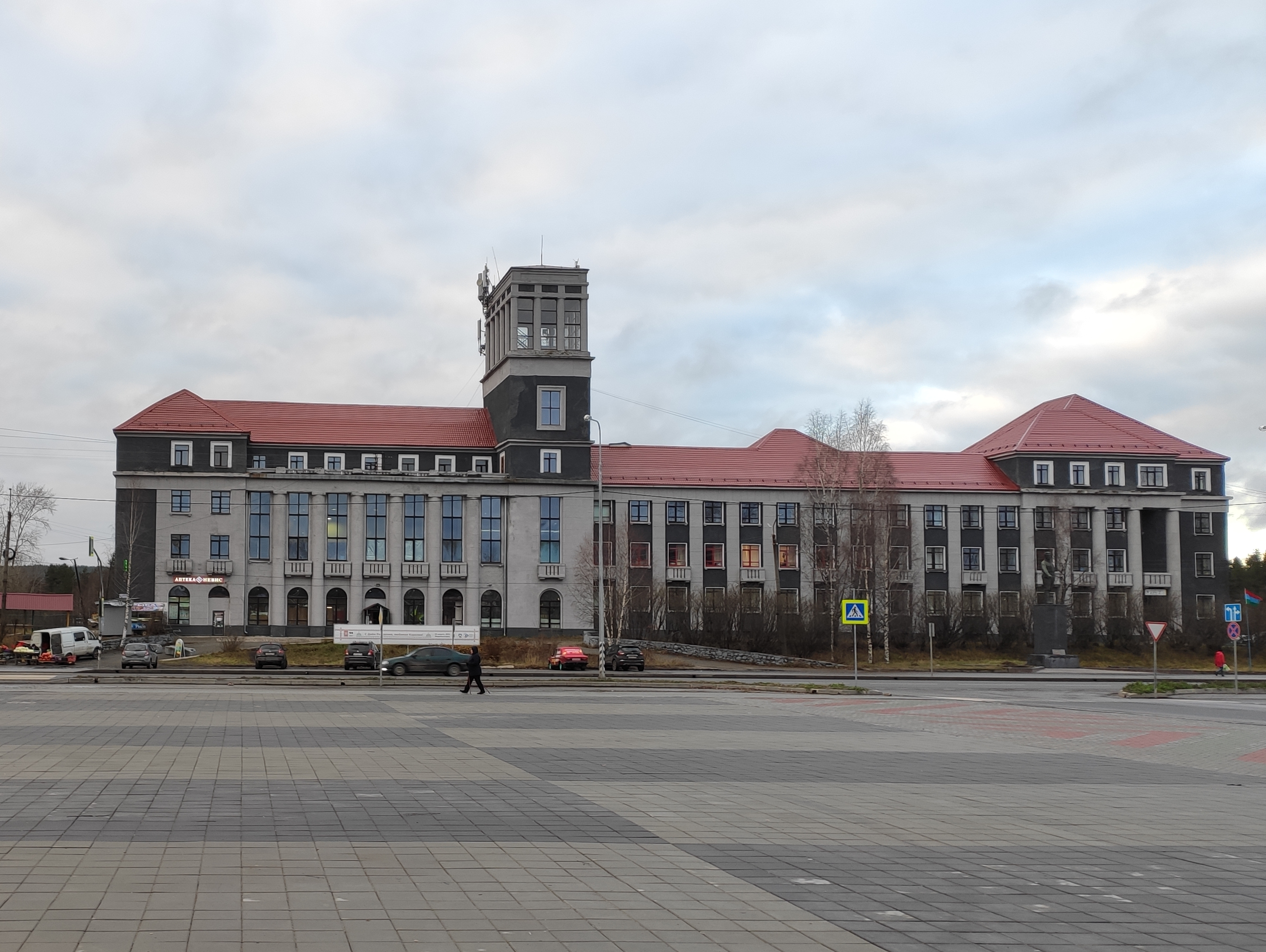
- White Sea–Baltic Canal administration building in Medvezhyegorsk

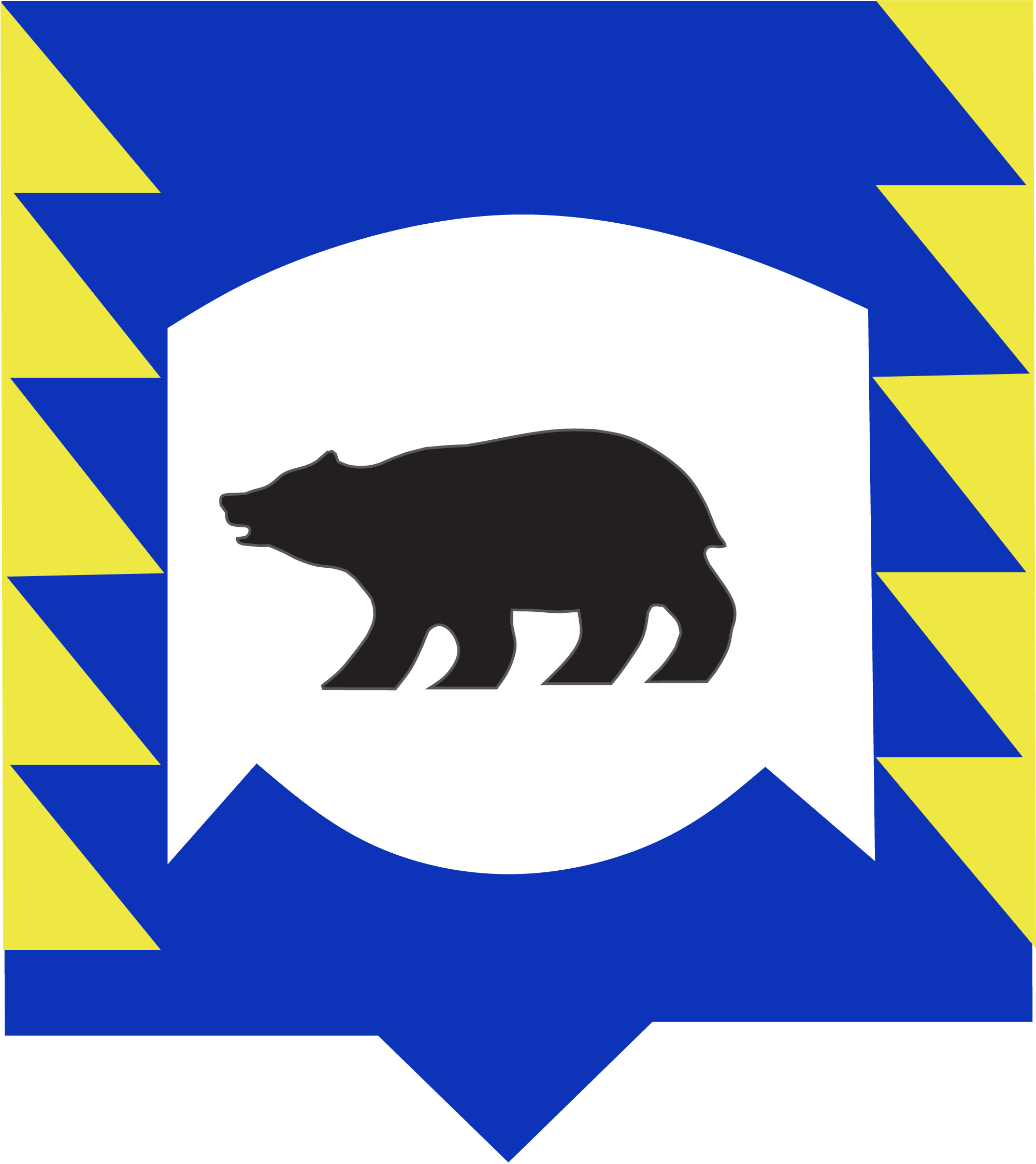
- Coat of arms
- Interactive map of Medvezhyegorsk
- Location of Medvezhyegorsk Medvezhyegorsk (Karelia)
- Coordinates: 62°54′N 34°28′E
- Country: Russia
- Federal subject: Republic of Karelia
- Administrative district: Medvezhyegorsky District
- Founded: 17th century
- Town status since: 1916
- Elevation: 80 m (260 ft)

Population (2010 Census)
  - Total: 15,533
  - Estimate (2023): 11,737 (−24.4%)

Administrative status
  - Capital of: Medvezhyegorsky District

Municipal status
  - Municipal district: Medvezhyegorsky Municipal District
  - Urban settlement: Medvezhyegorskoye Urban Settlement
  - Capital of: Medvezhyegorsky Municipal District, Medvezhyegorskoye Urban Settlement
- Time zone: UTC+3 (UTC+03:00)
- Postal code: 186350
- OKTMO ID: 86624101001

Medvezhyegorsk (Russian: Медвежьего́рск; Karelian: Karhumägi; Finnish: Karhumäki) is a town and the administrative center of Medvezhyegorsky District of the Republic of Karelia, Russia. Population: 15,533 (2010 census); 17,283 (2002 census); 20,373 (1989 Soviet census); 15,800 (1959).

== History ==
Between 1703–1710 and 1766–1769, a factory was operating in the village. Town status was granted to it in 1916, when it was known as Medvezhya Gora (Медвежья Гора, lit. "bear mount").

The current name was given to the town in 1938. During World War II, the town was occupied by the Finnish Army from 6 December 1941 to 23 June 1944.

It housed the headquarters of the Belbaltlag forced labor camp which manned the construction of the White Sea–Baltic Canal.

== Administrative and municipal status ==
Within the framework of administrative divisions, Medvezhyegorsk serves as the administrative center of Medvezhyegorsky District, to which it is directly subordinated. As a municipal division, the town of Medvezhyegorsk, together with three rural localities, is incorporated within Medvezhyegorsky Municipal District as Medvezhyegorskoye Urban Settlement.

== Transportation ==
Medvezhyegorsk is on the Murmansk railway south of the White Sea, and at the north end of Lake Onega. The White Sea–Baltic Canal passes by it.
