= A121 highway (Russia) =

Road in Russia

Federal Highway A121
- Федеральная автомобильная дорога А121
- Sortavala Highway

Route information
- Length: 502 km (312 mi)

Major junctions
- South end: A 118 in Saint Petersburg

- North end: R 21 near Pryazha

Location
- Country: Russia

Highway system
- Russian Federal Highways
← A 120	→ A 122

The Russian route A121, also known as the Sortavala Highway, is a Russian federal highway from Saint Petersburg to R21 highway in the Republic of Karelia. On the route Saint Petersburg – Sortavala – R21 "Kola" its length is 448 km. In 2017 a 54-km-long road section to Vyartsilya and Finland–Russia border became a part of the A121 highway increasing the total length of the Sortavala Highway to 502 km.

== Gallery ==
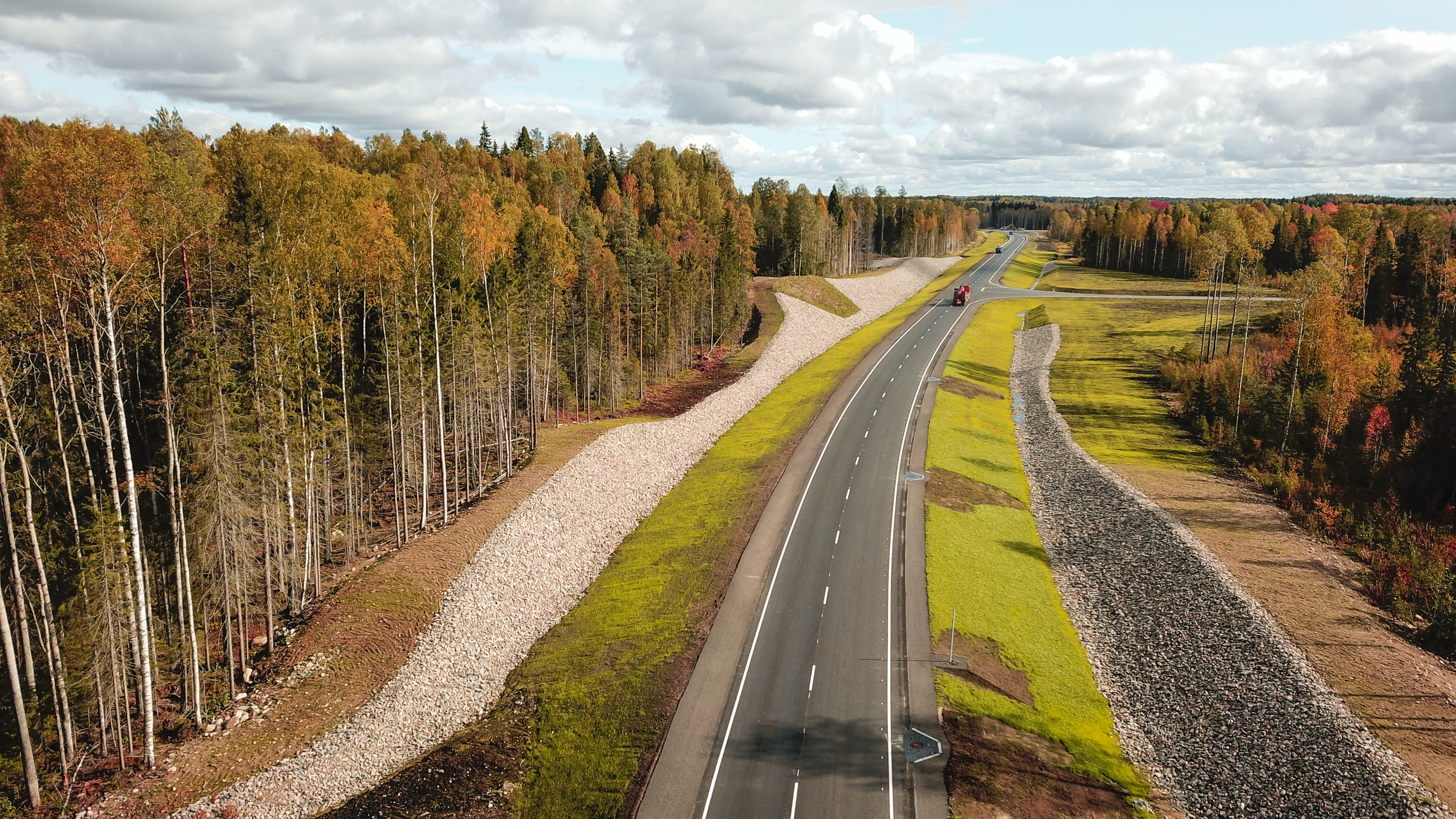
A121 "Sortavala" in Pryazhinsky District of the Republic of Karelia.

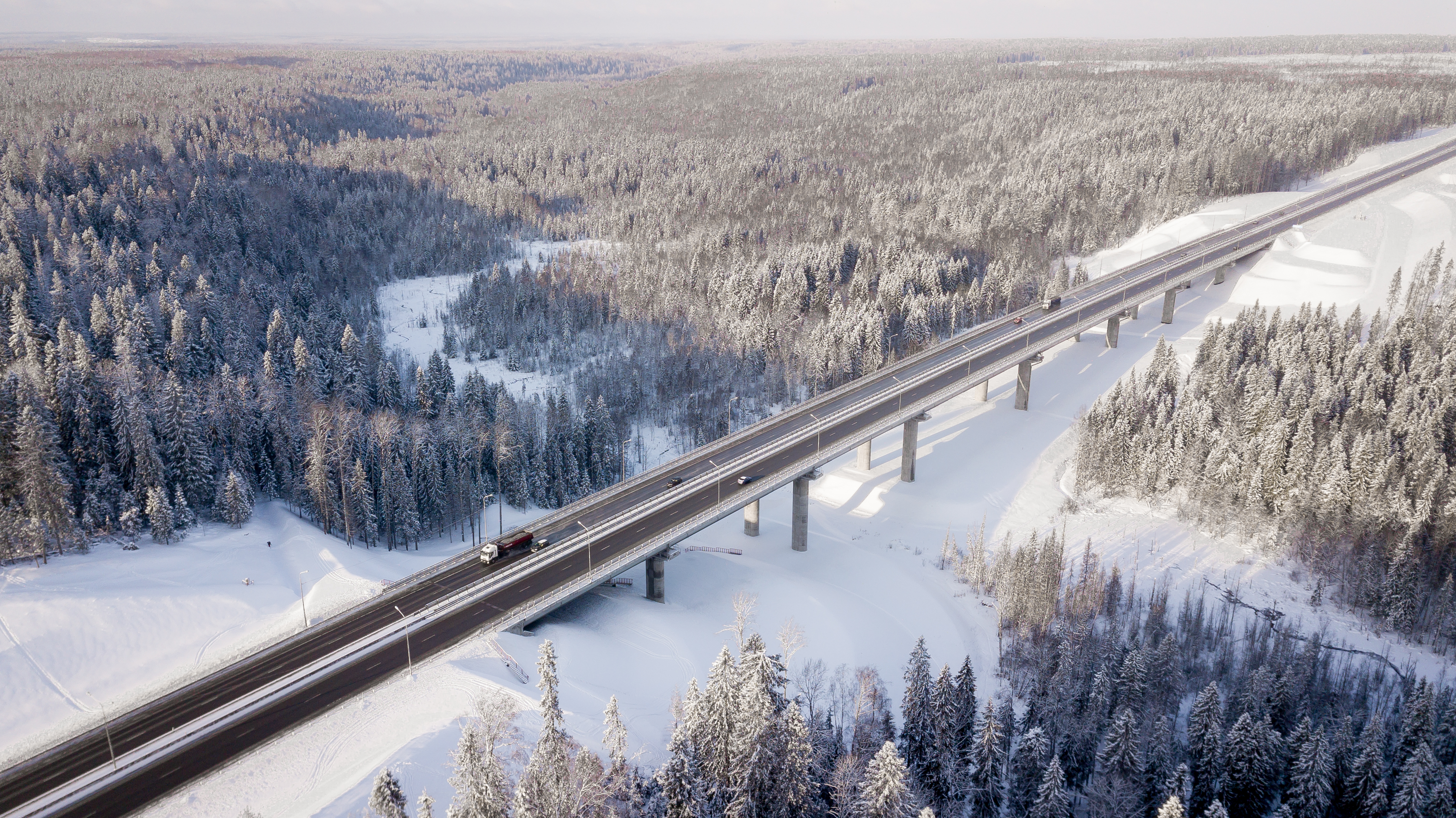
The highway in Priozersky District of Leningrad Oblast. Smorodinka River (Volchya tributary) flows beneath the bridge on the 46th km of the route.

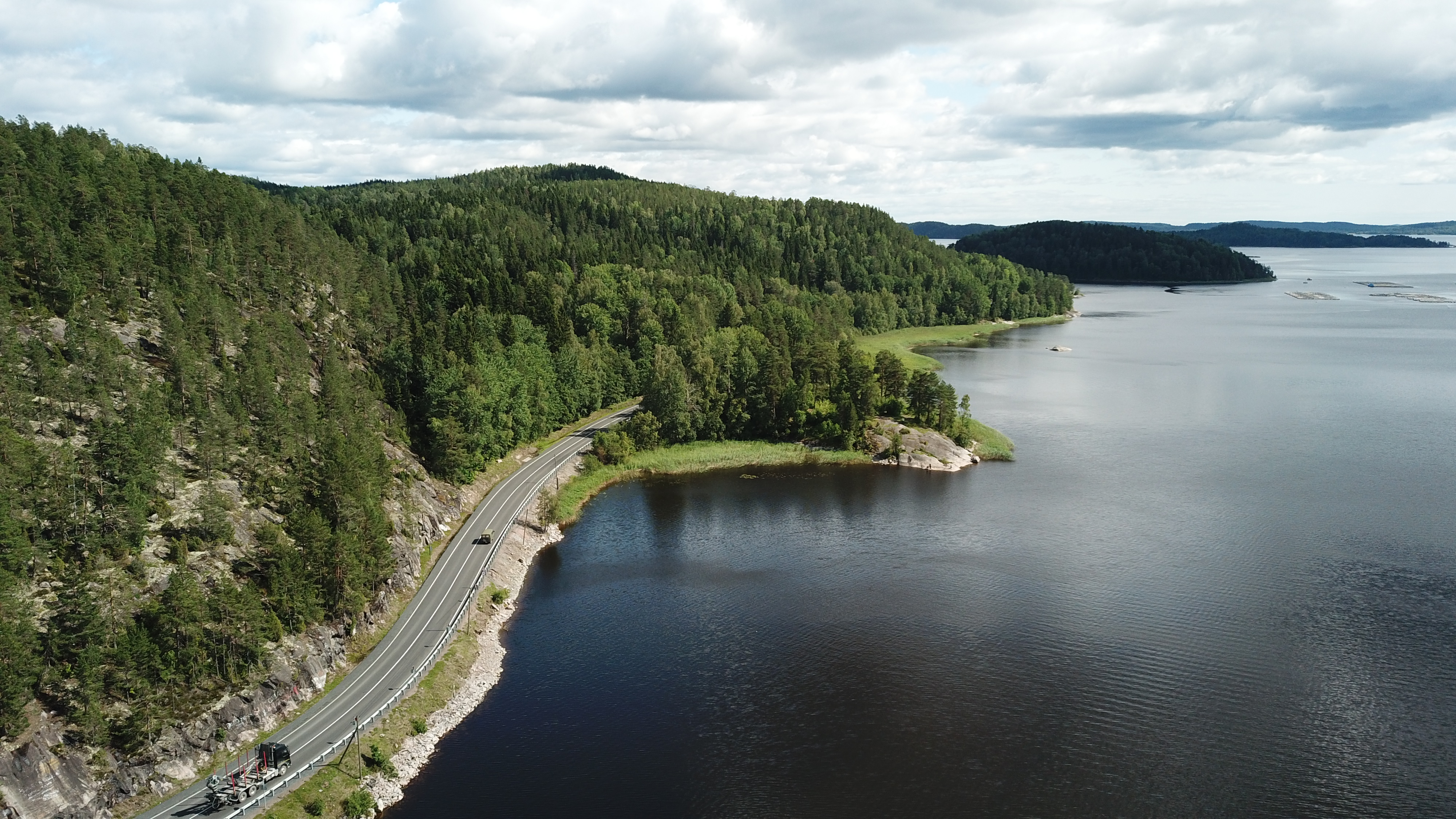
A121 highway on the coast of Lake Ladoga in Pitkyarantsky District of the Republic of Karelia.

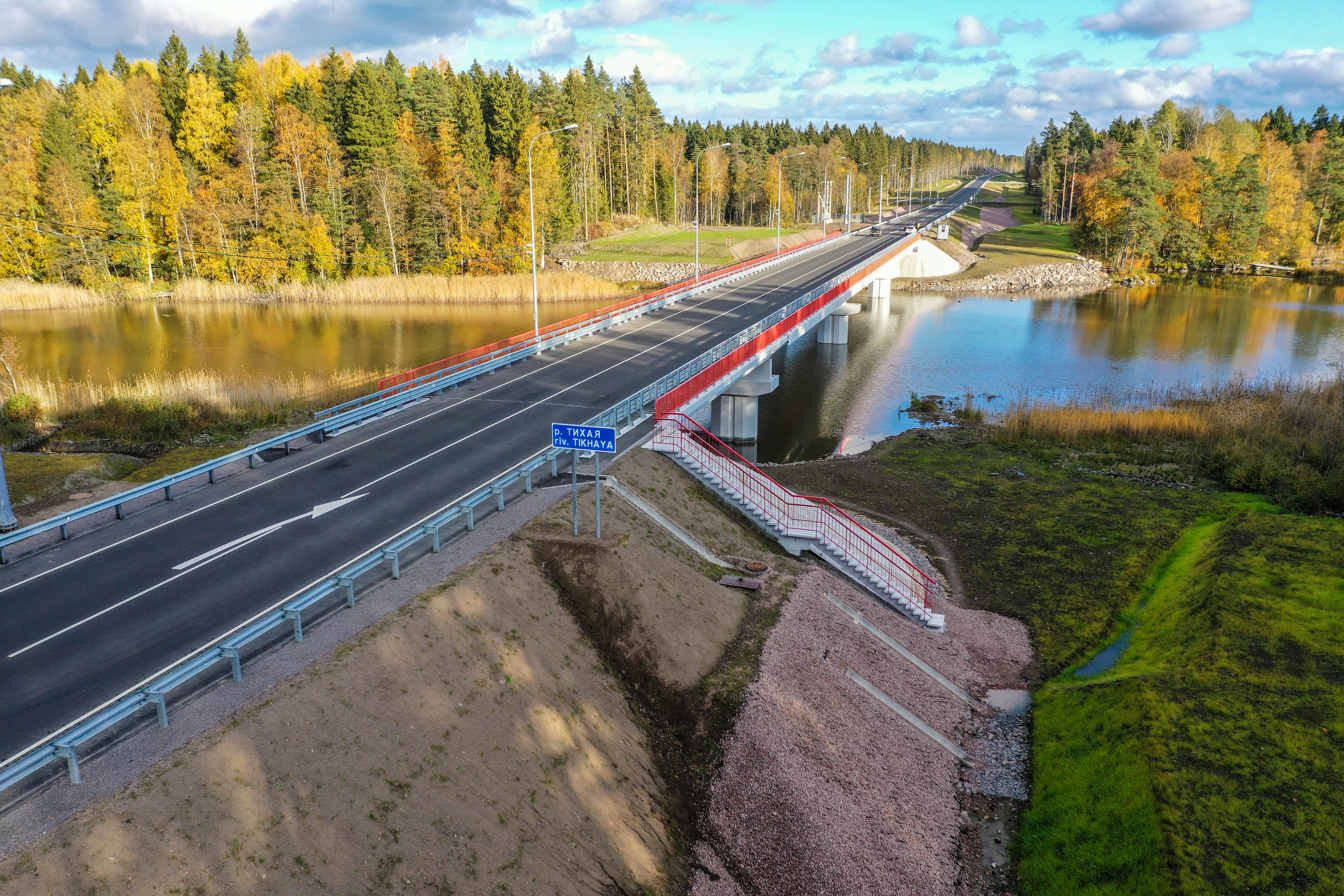
A bridge over Tikhaya River in Priozersky District in Leningrad Oblast.

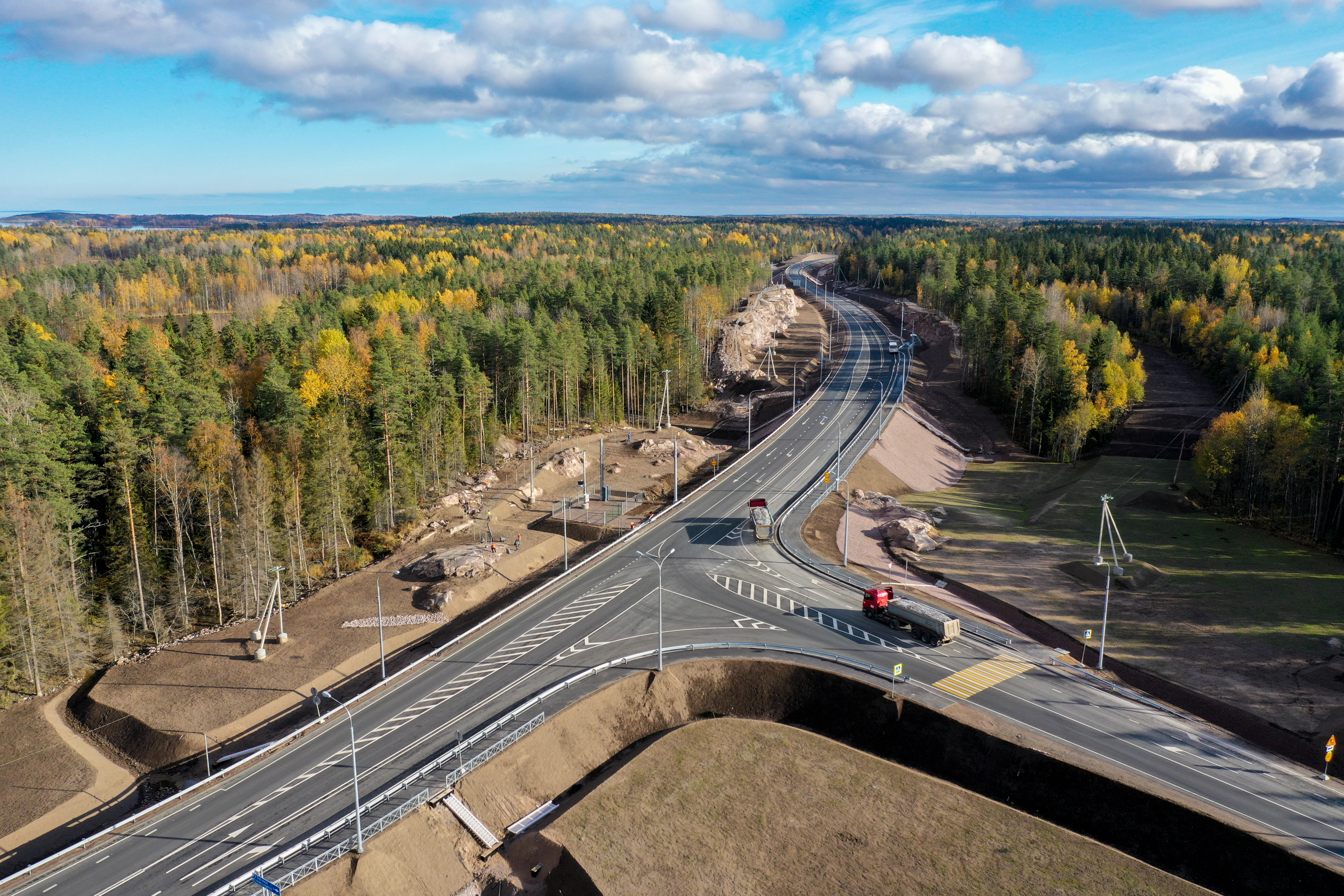
An intersection with regional road 41K-160.

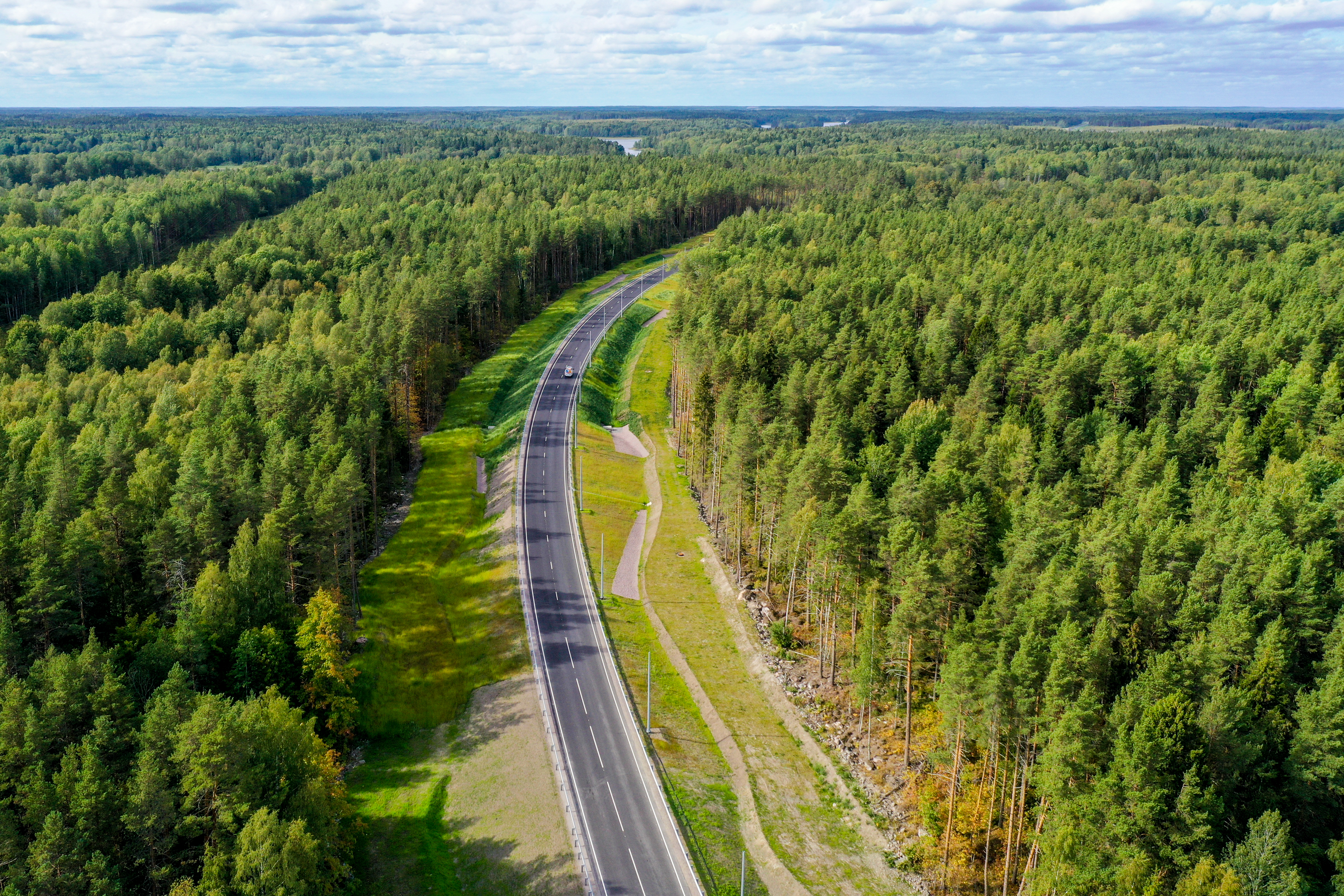
The road passes through a forest near Priozersk.
