= Sodder, Republic of Karelia =

Sodder Соддер
- Settlement (Посёлок)
- Location within Karelia Location within Russia
- Coordinates: 61.8049550°N 32.8513830°E
- Country: Russia
- Region: Republic of Karelia
- District: Pryazhinsky District
- Municipality: Essoyla

Population (2013-1-1)
  - Total: 188
- Time zone: UTC+03:00
- Postal code: 186139

Sodder (Russian: Соддер) is a settlement in the Essoyla rural settlement (сельское поселение) of Pryazhinsky District, Republic of Karelia, Russia. The population in 2013 was 188. The distance to Pryazha is 78 km.

== Geography ==
Sodder is located on the Shuya river, near the western shore of lake Shotozero.

== History ==
Sodder was established in May 1949. It is named after the ducks living in the area, likely through the Livvi word sotku referring to various species of duck. It was the center of a rural administration including Kamennavolok, Novye Peski and Ulyalega until the 20th of January 2003.

== Economy ==
Sodder's economy is based on forestry.

== Sights ==
There is a grave for Soviet pilots who died during the Second World War.

A "village day" has been celebrated on the 19th of August.
