= Pryazhinsky =

Pryazhinsky (masculine), Pryazhinskaya (feminine), or Pryazhinskoye (neuter) may refer to:

- Pryazhinsky District, a district of the Republic of Karelia, Russia
- Pryazhinskoye Urban Settlement, a municipal formation into which the urban-type settlement of Pryazha and three rural localities in Pryazhinsky District of the Republic of Karelia, Russia are incorporated
