= Manga, Russia =

Manga (Russian: Маньга) is the name of several rural localities in Pryazhinsky District of the Republic of Karelia, Russia:

- Manga (settlement), Republic of Karelia, a settlement
- Manga (village), Republic of Karelia, a village
