= RusAir =

Russian airline

AtlasJet
IATA	ICAO	Call sign
-	CGI	CGI
- Founded: 1994
- Ceased operations: 2011
- Hubs: Sheremetyevo International Airport
- Fleet size: 2
- Parent company: Clintondale Aviation (100%)
- Headquarters: Moscow, Russia
- Website: rusair.com

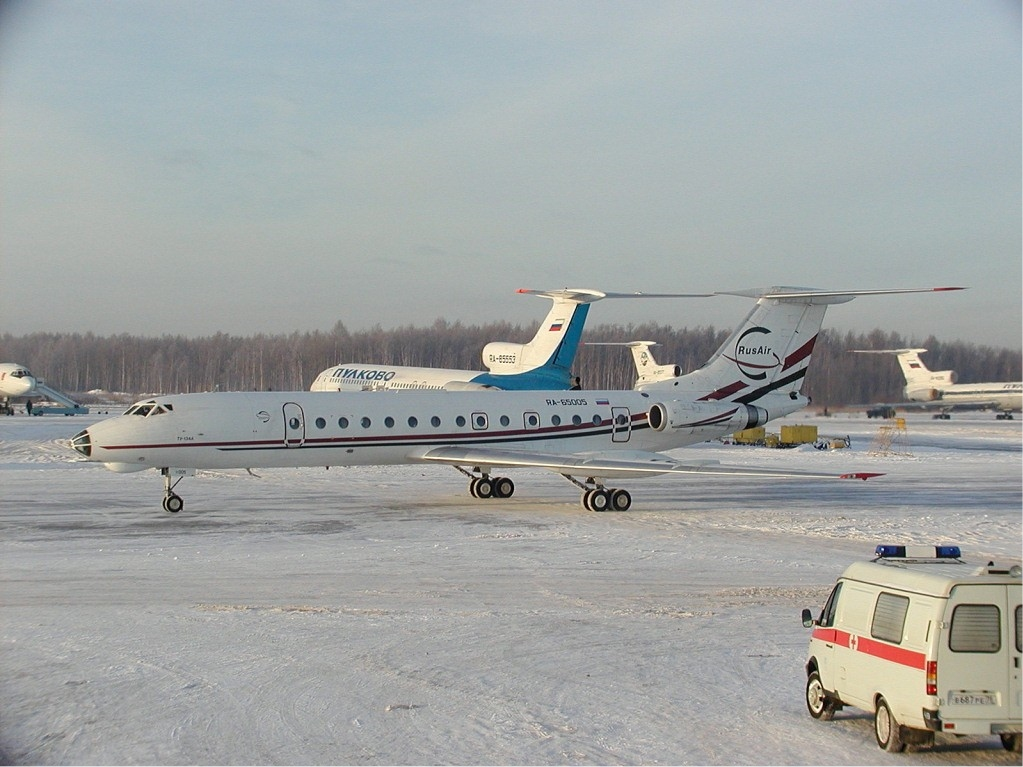
RusAir Tupolev Tu-134, St Petersburg, 2001

AtlasJet (formerly RusAir) was a Russian airline with its headquarters in Moscow, Russia, and its base at Sheremetyevo International Airport. It provided charter services, business flights, aviation management and project support as well as international medevac services.

== History ==
The airline was established on 30 November 1994 and started operations in 1994. It was formerly known as CGI Aero. It was fully owned by Clintondale Aviation. By 2010, it was sold to a new owner. Following the fatal accident in 2011, its AOC license was revoked. On 28 October 2011, the airline re-opened after changing its name to "AtlasJet".

== Fleet ==
As of June 2015, the AtlasJet fleet includes the following aircraft:

- 2 Sukhoi Superjet 100

== Accidents and incidents ==
- On 20 June 2011, a RusAir Tupolev Tu-134A-3K Flight 243, operating for RusLine, with 43 passengers and nine crew crash landed, broke up, and caught fire on a highway short of the runway at Petrozavodsk Airport while en route from Moscow to Petrozavodsk, killing 47 people and leaving five survivors.
