= Besovets =

Besovets Бесовец
- Hamlet
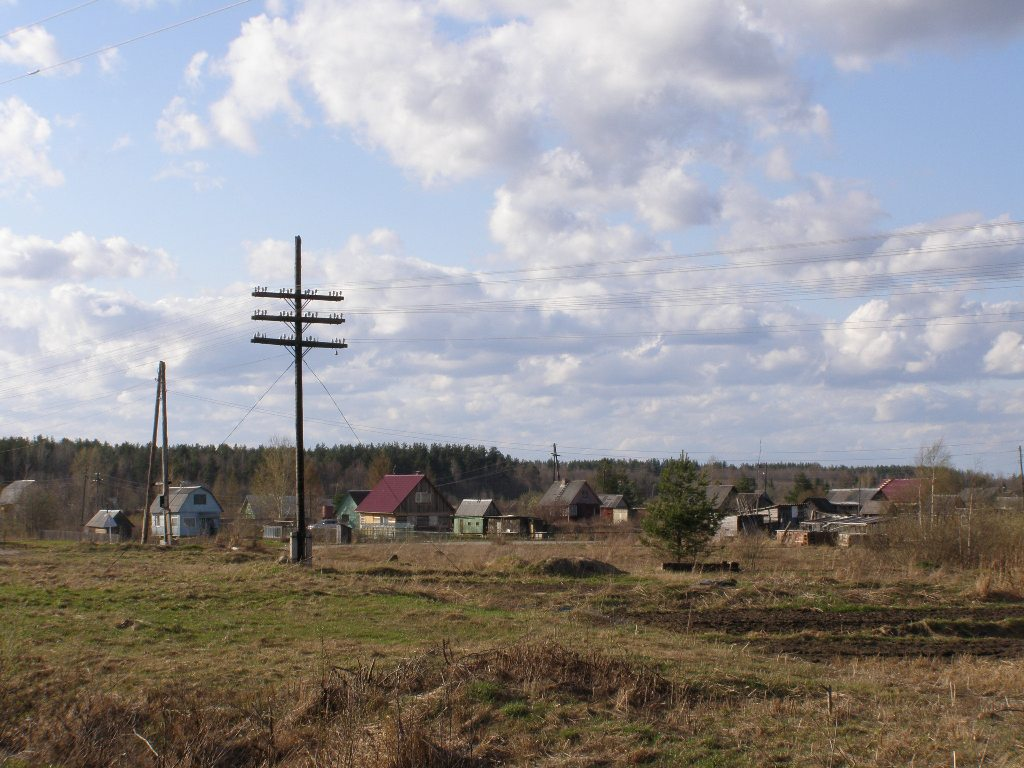
- One of the streets in Besovets (Karelia)
- Interactive map of Besovets
- Location of Besovets Besovets (Karelia)
- Coordinates: 61°51′N 34°9′E
- Country: Russia
- Federal subject: Republic of Karelia
- Administrative district: Prionezhsky District

Population
  - Estimate (2009): 120 )

Municipal status
  - Municipal district: Prionezhsky Municipal District
  - Rural settlement: Shuyskoye Rural Settlement
- Time zone: UTC+3 (UTC+03:00)
- Postal code: 186100
- OKTMO ID: 86636470141

Besovets (Russian: Бесовец; Karelian: Besouččua, Besoučču; Finnish: Pesoutsa) is a rural locality (a village) in Prionezhsky District of the Republic of Karelia, Russia. Municipally, it is a part of the Shuyskoye Rural Settlement of Prionezhsky Municipal District.

It is located in the vicinity of the capital of Karelia, Petrozavodsk, on the Shuya River. The Petrozavodsk–Suoyarvi highway passes through the village.

Petrozavodsk Airport is located near the village.

== History ==
The village was founded in the 16th century.

On June 20, 2011, RusAir Flight 9605 crashed near Besovets while on approach to Petrozavodsk Airport, killing forty-five and injuring seven people.

== Population ==
In 2009 the village had a population of 120 people.

== Gallery ==
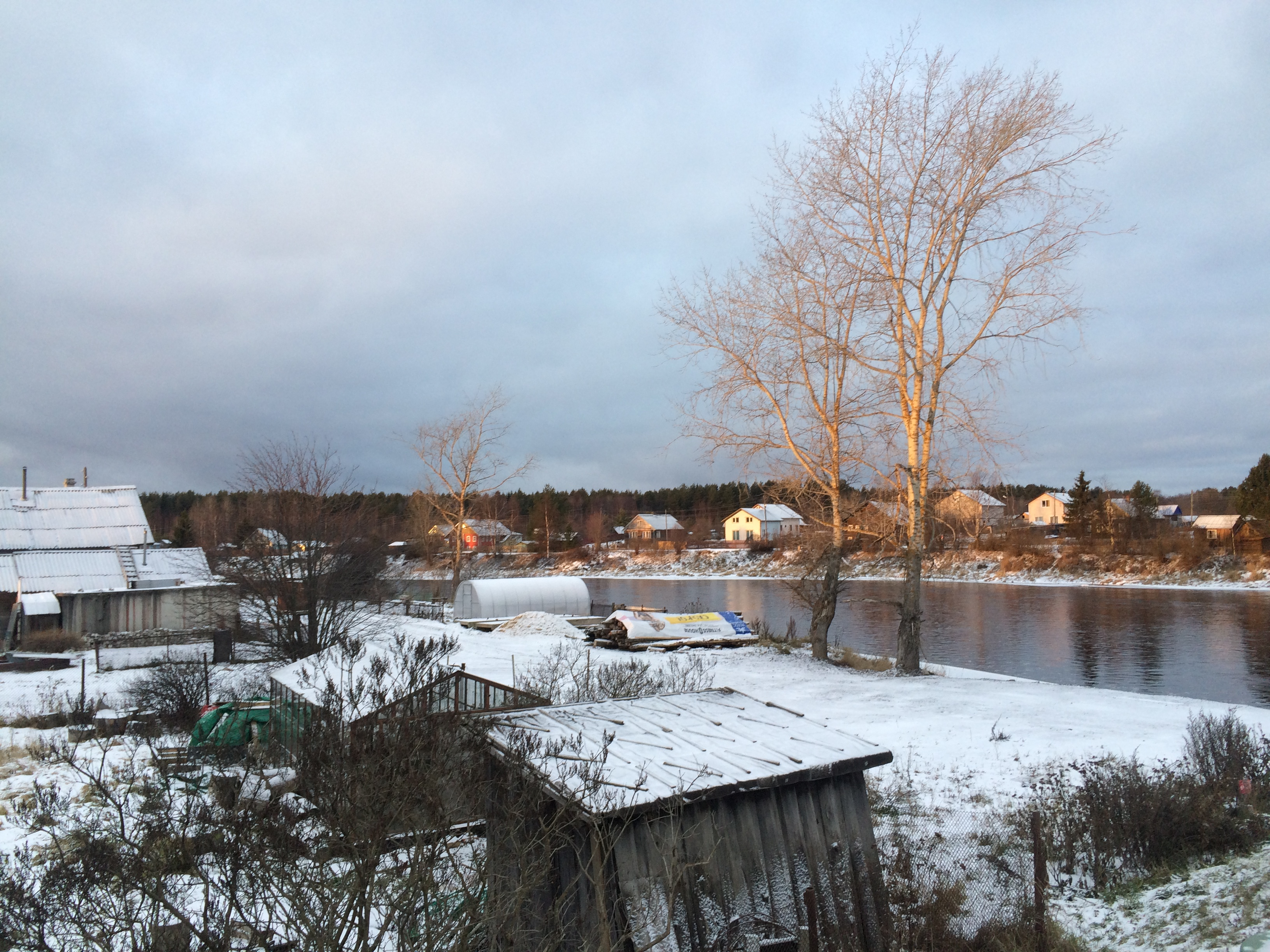
Besovets

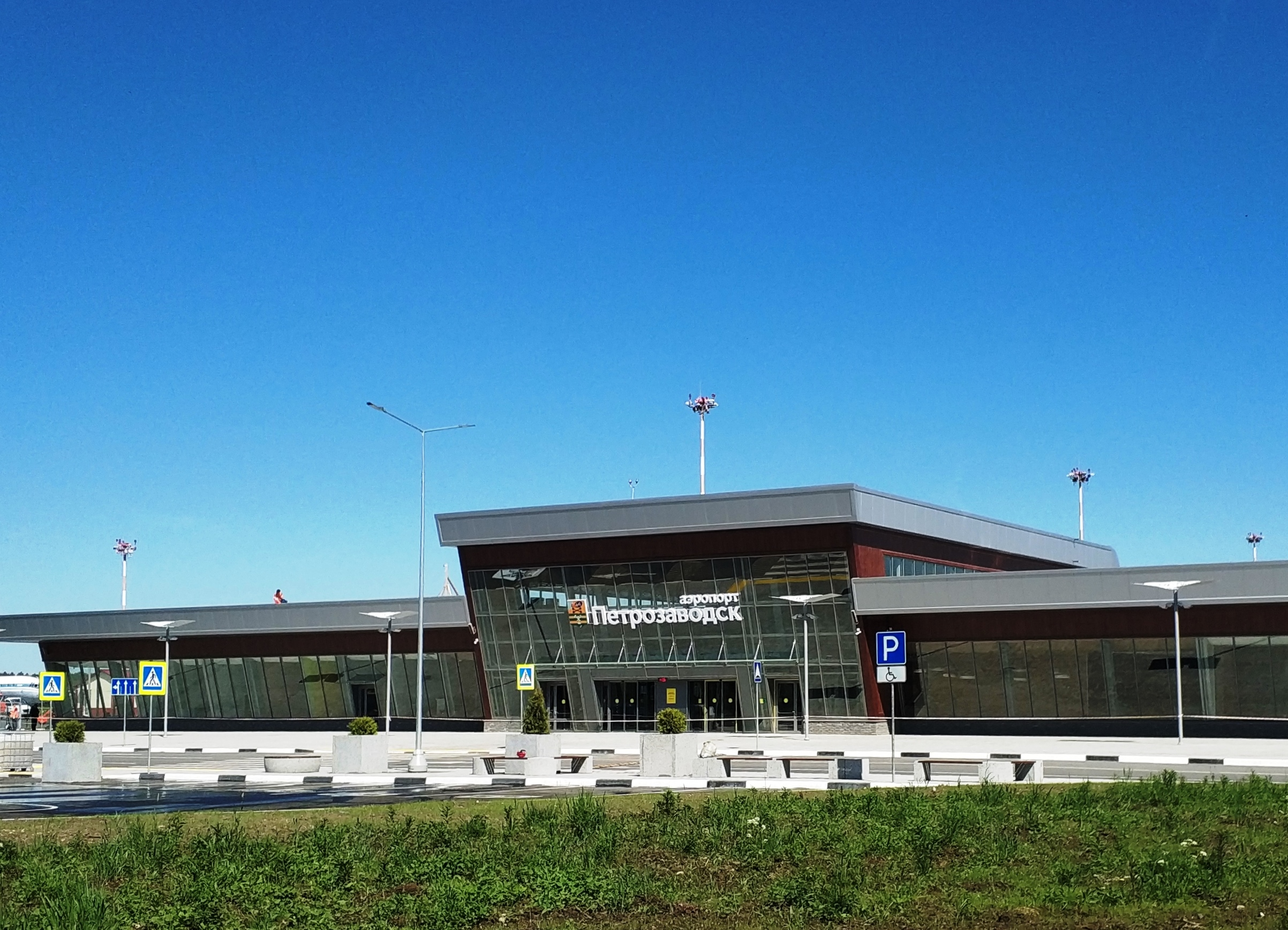
Petrozavodsk airport

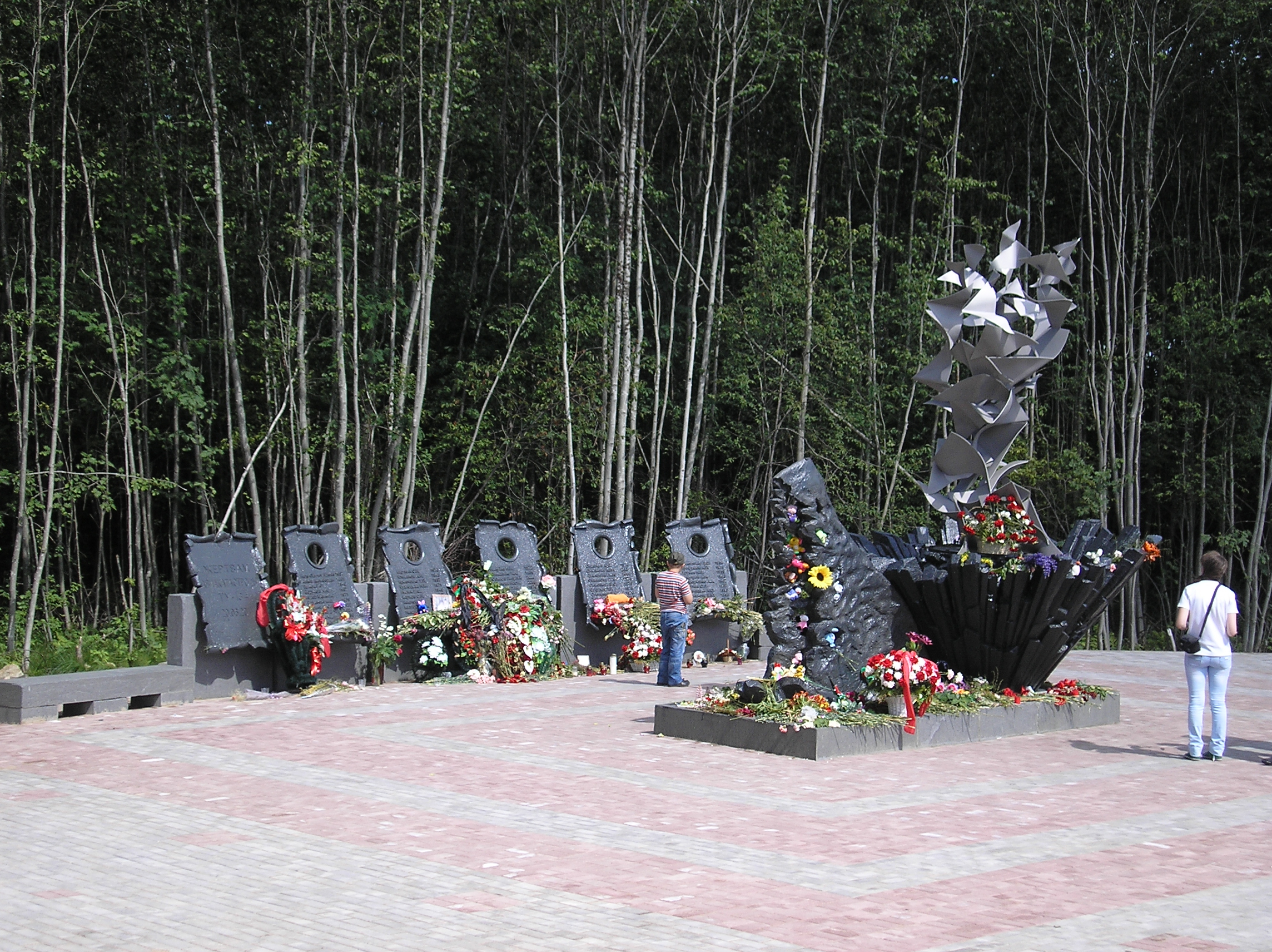
RusAir 9605 monument
