= Archil Gelovani =

Soviet general (1915–1978)

- Born: 27 November [O.S. 14 November] 1915; Spatagori, Tsageri District, Georgia, Russian Empire
- Died: 19 August 1978 (aged 62); Moscow, USSR
- Military career
- Allegiance: (Soviet Union) USSR
- Branch: Soviet Army
- Service years: 1939–1978
- Rank: Marshal of Engineer Troops
- Nickname: "The Builder"
- Units: diverse engineering corps 1962 Strategic missile forces
- Commands: Strategic defence of the Black Sea Region around Ukraine and southern Caucasus; 1977 all engineering troops of the Soviet Union
- Conflicts: World War II
- Awards: Order of Lenin

Archil Viktorovich Gelovani (Georgian: არჩილ გელოვანი, Russian: Арчил Викторович Геловани; 27 November [O.S. 14 November] 1915 – 19 August 1978) was a Soviet officer and later Marshal of the engineer troops, responsible for logistics, fortification and military infrastructure during and after World War II. He was tasked on several occasions with fortifying strategically important areas and also reconstruction, including all Black Sea ports during and after World War II. He served primarily on military engineering and defense strategy posts, including being the Deputy Minister of Defence and would play a major role in the structural development of the Soviet armed forces and strategic missile forces during the Cold War era. An avenue in Georgia's capital Tbilisi and a street in the city of Sevastopol have been named after Marshal Gelovani.

== Early life ==
Gelovani was born on November 27, 1915, in the village Spatagori of the Tsageri Municipality in Georgia. The boy was not yet six years old when his father, known in the Caucasus as Viktor Gelovani the engineer, died of typhoid fever. The orphan had to learn to live and grow up the hard way. But instead of breaking the young man, it only contributed in steeling his character.

In 1936 after graduating from the Tbilisi Industrial Institute, he started his career as engineer. After only three years his life took a radical change. Gelovani joined the Soviet Army as the army was in need of competent experts, since it became clearer that a war would be the case soon or later. The young engineer quickly found his place in the armed forces and rose through its ranks.

== Military career ==
As a military technician of 1st rank, he began his activities with the Black Sea Fleet and got soon appointed to chief engineer for constructions. The Great Patriotic War found him quickly when he led a small task force of engineers to construct several artillery positions and place artillery batteries on them under heaviest enemy shelling and impossible conditions. The 152 mm guns would play a great role during the Battle of Perekop which was part of the Crimean Offensive. For completing this mission Gelovani received his first and personally most memorable award, the Order of the Red Star. Many more would follow.

In the postwar years, Archil Gelovani's work was associated mainly to Reconstruction, particularly coastal areas of the Black Sea. Thus in 1953 he was appointed Chief of Military Infrastructure in the port city of Sevastopol, which was heavily damaged during the war. The reconstruction of Sevastopol was given high importance as it would serve as the main base of the Black Fleet and was strictly observed by Moscow. Due to his huge success and numerous other efforts in the area, Gelovani would be later granted the title of 'Honorary Citizen and Hero of Sevastopol' in 1976. One of Sevastopols streets was also named after him.

From 1956 to 1959 Gelovani performed construction works while being second in command of the Black Sea Fleet. Later on the same year, he got appointed to deputy commander of the Soviet Navy Construction Buro with the rank of Major-General.

The success of military builder Archil Gelovani evaluated which made him receive a position as Chief Engineer of the Strategic Missile Troops. It was then in 1962, when a new branch in the armed forces celebrated its second year. The Engineering forces had to complete a gigant task which was to build missile systems and launchers in time and quickly put them on alert. In 1968 Gelovani received the Lenin Prize for the development and implementation of special military facilities. A few years later he would also receive the State Prize in accordance to the successful emplacement and in time readiness of all strategic missiles.

In 1974 he was appointed to become the Deputy Minister of Defence for Construction and Billeting of Troops. A huge map in his office covered symbols of construction projects. In 1977 for serving as engineer, organizer and guide for the construction of countless military and also civilian infrastructure, Colonel General Archil V Gelovani was awarded the title Marshal of Engineering Troops.

== Death ==
As a result of an unknown disease, Marshal Archil Gelovali died on August 19, 1978, in Moscow. In the hospital he gave a short interview to one of the military magazines:

The real builder can only be someone who loves his profession, and even more - the people ...

He was buried in the Novodevichy Cemetery in Moscow.

== Honours and awards ==
Gelovani received a total of 37 awards, including the following:

- Order of Lenin
- Order of the Patriotic War, 1st class
- Order of the Red Banner of Labour
- Supreme Soviet of the Soviet Union
- Order of the Red Star, twice
- Order for Service to the Homeland in the Armed Forces of the USSR, 3rd class
- People's Architect of the USSR
- Medal "For the Defence of Sevastopol"
- Medal "For the Defence of Odessa"
- Medal "For the Defence of the Caucasus"
- Order for Service to the Homeland in the Armed Forces of the USSR
- Order of the Badge of Honour
- Order of the October Revolution
- Order of Labour Glory
- Medal "For Courage" (Russia)
- Medal "For Impeccable Service", all classes
- Medal "Veteran of the Armed Forces of the USSR"
- Medal "For Labour Valour"
- Jubilee Medal "Twenty Years of Victory in the Great Patriotic War 1941-1945"
- Jubilee Medal "Thirty Years of Victory in the Great Patriotic War 1941-1945"
- Jubilee Medal "30 Years of the Soviet Army and Navy"
- Jubilee Medal "40 Years of the Armed Forces of the USSR"
- Jubilee Medal "50 Years of the Armed Forces of the USSR"
- Lenin Prize (1968)
- Jubilee Medal "In Commemoration of the 100th Anniversary since the Birth of Vladimir Il'ich Lenin"
- USSR State Prize (1977)
- Honoured Builder of the RSFSR (1971)
- numerous foreign awards
