= RusAir Flight 9605 =

2011 aviation accident in Russia

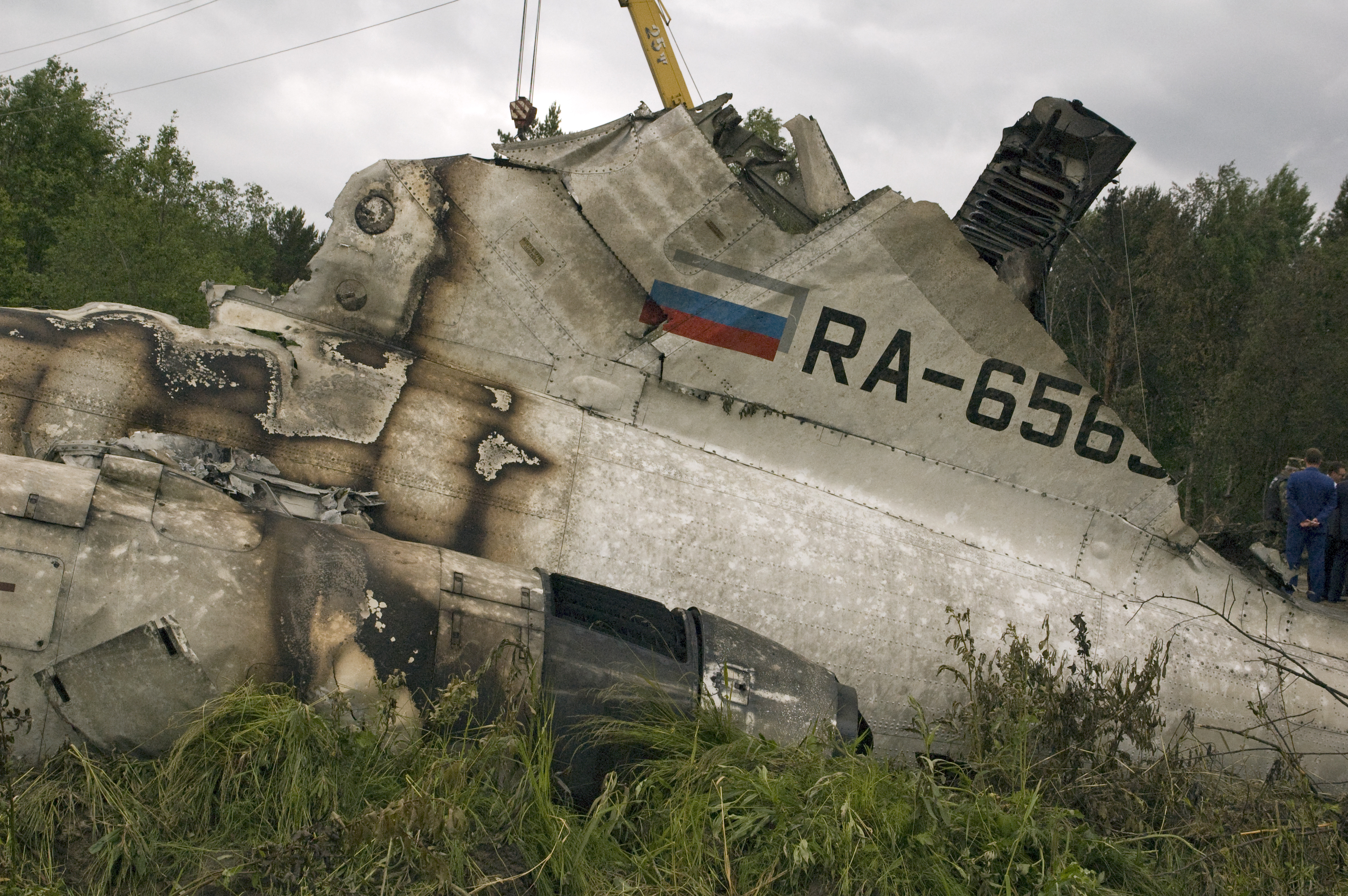
- Wreckage of the aircraft's tail section

Accident
- Date: 20 June 2011
- Summary: Controlled flight into terrain due to poor crew resource management and pilot error
- Site: Besovets, near Petrozavodsk Airport, Petrozavodsk, Prionezhsky District, Republic of Karelia, Russia; 61°52′04″N 034°08′53″E

Aircraft
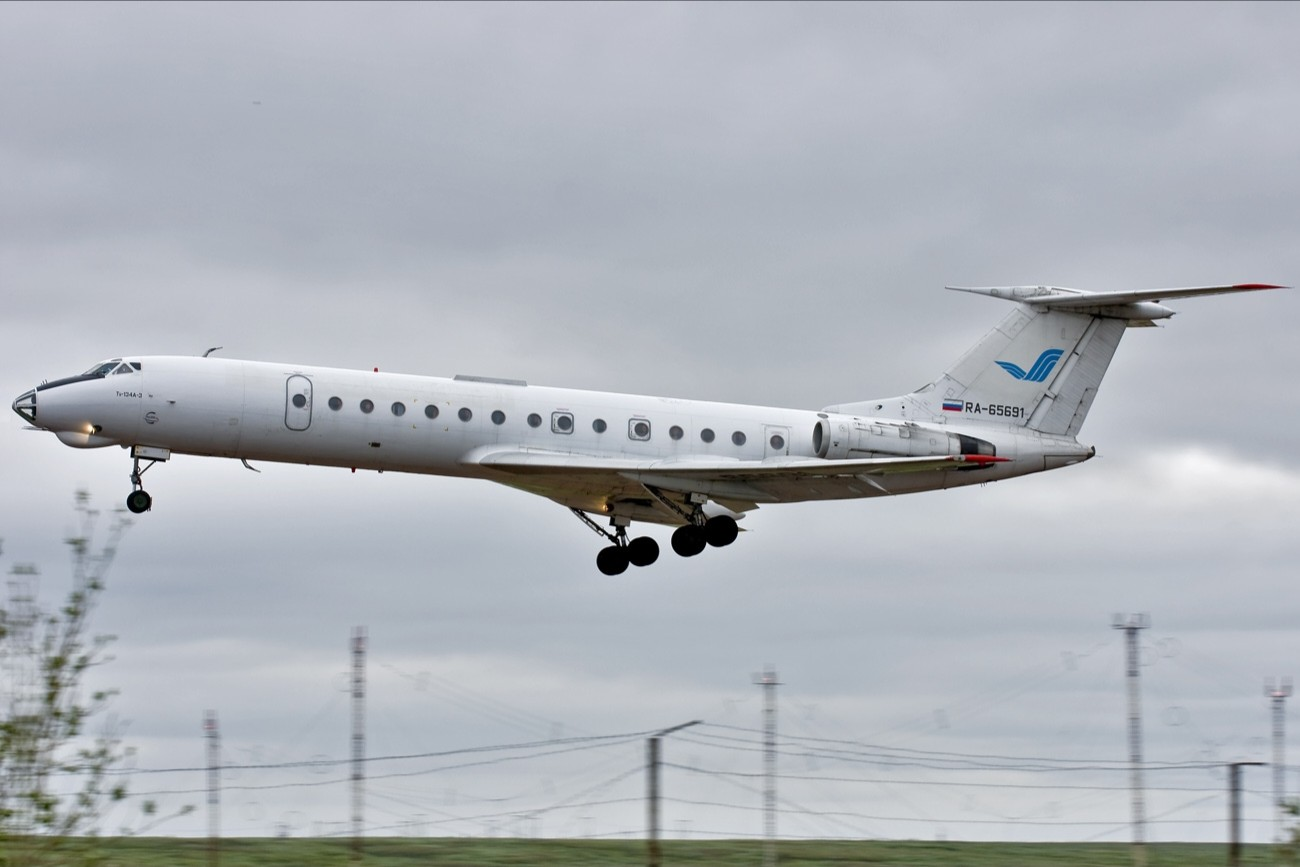
- RA-65691, the aircraft involved, seen on the day of the accident
- Aircraft type: Tupolev Tu-134A-3
- Operator: RusAir
- ICAO flight No.: CGI9605
- Call sign: CGI 9605
- Registration: RA-65691
- Flight origin: Domodedovo International Airport, Moscow, Russia
- Destination: Petrozavodsk Airport, Petrozavodsk, Russia
- Occupants: 52
- Passengers: 43
- Crew: 9
- Fatalities: 47
- Injuries: 5
- Survivors: 5

RusAir Flight 9605 (operating as RusLine Flight 243) was a passenger flight which crashed near Petrozavodsk in the Republic of Karelia, Russia, on 20 June 2011 while attempting to land in thick fog. The aircraft involved, a Tupolev Tu-134, was operating a RusAir scheduled domestic flight from Moscow. Of the 52 people on board, only 5 survived.

The investigation concluded that the crash was caused by pilot error. After receiving outdated weather information, the crew attempted to land at Petrozavodsk despite worsening weather conditions. The navigator, who was intoxicated but relied upon because of his extensive experience with the Tu-134, unintentionally guided the aircraft off course. As they were trying to line up with the runway, the crew continued descending in an attempt to break through the fog. The absence of callouts from the first officer and the intoxicated navigator caused the crew to remain unaware of their decreasing altitude until the aircraft struck trees and crashed inverted.

== Aircraft ==
The aircraft involved was a twin-engine Tupolev Tu-134A-3, registration RA-65691, c/n 63195, manufactured and first flown in 1980. The aircraft was delivered to Aeroflot for four years before being transferred to flew with the 235th Separate Government Detachment. It was acquired by North Caucasus Civil Aviation Administration for nine years before it was transferred to multiple Russian airlines, including Volga-Aviaexpress and Tatarstan Airlines. RusAir bought the aircraft in March 2011. The 31-year-old aircraft had a total of 40,000 flight hours and 25,000 flights and was equipped with two D-30-III turbofan engines.

== Passengers and crew ==
There were 43 passengers and nine crew members on board. Most of the passengers were Russian, among which was a family of four who held a dual U.S-Russian citizenship. The manifest indicated that there were 4 foreigners on board, including 2 Ukrainians, 1 Dutch and 1 Swede. There were 7 children on board the flight.

Casualties by country
| Nationality | Fatalities | Survivors |
|---|---|---|
| Russia | 39 | 5 |
| Russia / United States (dual citizenship) | 4 | 0 |
| Ukraine | 2 | 0 |
| Netherlands | 1 | 0 |
| Sweden | 1 | 0 |
| Total | 47 | 5 |

Among the passengers were FIFA football referee Vladimir Pettay, as well senior members of Gidropress, including the CEO and chief designer, Sergei Ryzhov; the deputy CEO and chief designer, Gennady Banyuk, also the chief designer of the Russian VVER-1000 for the Kudankulam Nuclear Power Plant in India and Bushehr Nuclear Power Plant in Iran, Nikolai Trunov.

The flight crew were consisted of:

- Captain Alexander Ivanovich Fyodorov (44), who was the commander of the flight. He was hired by RusAir in March 2011 and had a total flying experience of 8,501 hours, of which more than 3,100 hours were on the type. He had been flying as a captain of the Tu-134 for 1,627 hours. Before joining RusAir, he had been flying for Aeroflot Nord, Utair, and a local airline in Naryan-Mar. He also had piloted the Mil Mi-8 helicopter and Antonov An-2. During his time at UTair Express, he had been involved in an accident in which the aircraft he was piloting suffered a hard landing in Vnukovo Airport, causing him to resign from the airline.
- First Officer Sergey Nikolaevich Karyakin (40), who was the co-pilot of the flight. He had been working for RusAir since November 2010 and had been a co-pilot of the Tu-134 since 2007. According to his logs, he had acquired a total flying hours of 2,846 hours, 1,099 of them on the Tu-134. Before joining RusAir, he had been flying with Samara Airlines, Izhavia and Adygea Airlines.
- Navigator-instructor Amanberdy Atayev (50), who had the most experience with the Tu-134. He had been flying with RusAir since August 2010 and had a total flying experience of 13,699 hours. Approximately 13,464 hours were on the Tu-134. He had been working as a navigator since 1981.
- Flight Engineer Viktor Evgenievich Timoshenko (56), who was the most senior of the flight. He joined RusAir in July 2005 and had a total flying experience of 11,231 hours, of which 2,494 hours were on the type. Before flying the Tu-134, he had been flying with the Yakovlev Yak-40. His flight logs showed that he had been a flight mechanic on the Tu-134 since 2001.

== Accident ==
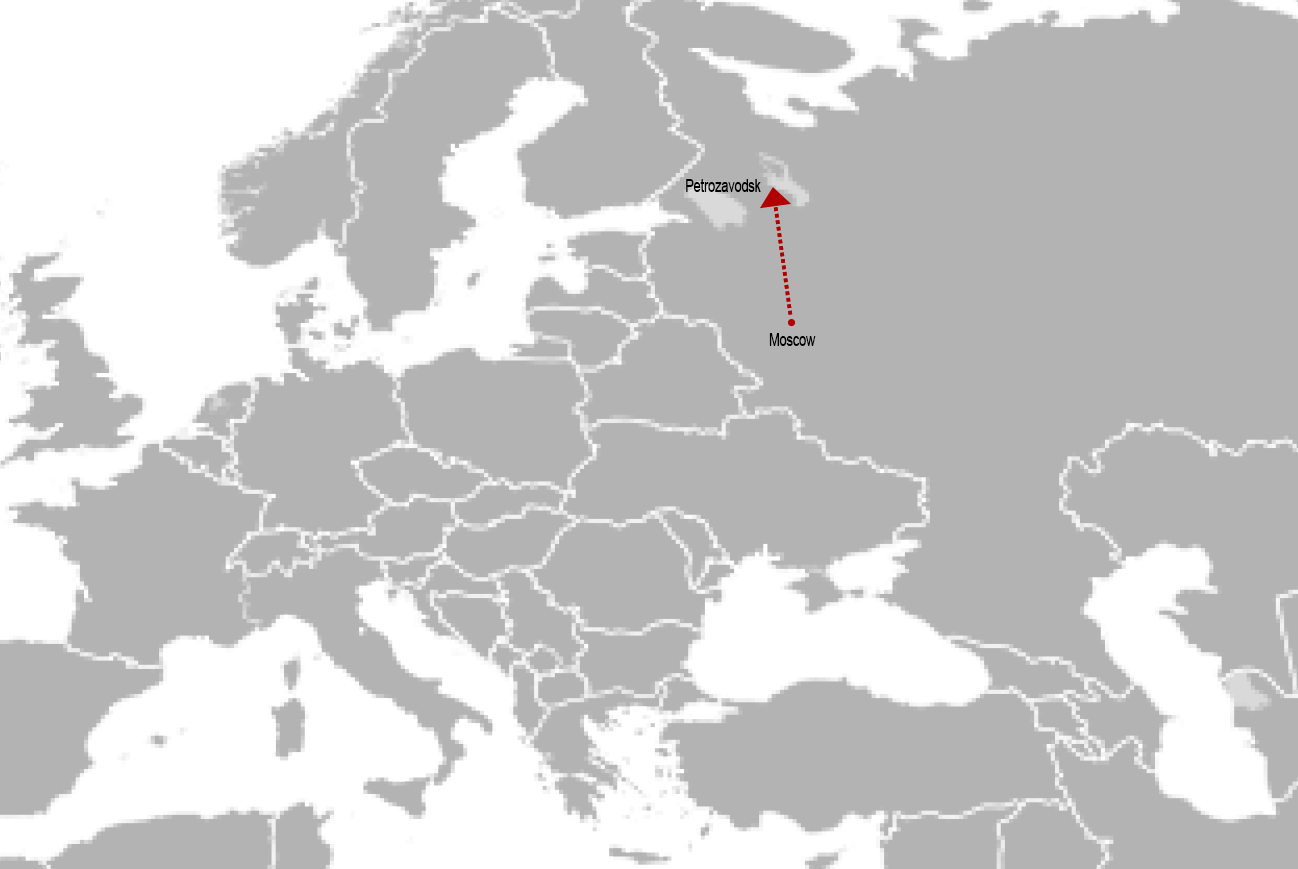
Route of Flight 9605

Flight 9605 was a chartered domestic passenger flight from Moscow's Domodedovo International Airport to Petrozavodsk "Besovets" Airport in the Northwest of Russia. The flight was originally supposed to be operated by a Bombardier CRJ-200 with RusLine being the operator of the flight, but the airline had to charter RusAir's Tupolev Tu-134 as one of RusLine's CRJ-200s was having problems. The charter was done on short notice, and on that same day the passengers were quickly transferred to the Tu-134. The flight was scheduled to take off at 22:10 local time and was expected to arrive in Petrozavodsk approximately one hour and 10 minutes later.

A total of 46 passengers were supposed to be on the flight; however, three passengers from Sverdlovsk weren't able to board the aircraft due to their late arrival in Moscow. There were 52 people on board, including 9 crew members, consisting of 4 cockpit crews, 3 cabin crews, and 2 flight technicians who were seated in the passenger area. The flight would be commanded by Captain Alexander Fyodorov with his co-pilot, First Officer Sergey Karyakin, as the non-flying pilot.

Before the flight, the crew had received the latest update on the weather information for Petrozavodsk Airport. It was forecasted to be cloudy with light rain and a marginal visibility of 2.1 km. The condition was still allowable for a flight and was not forecasted to worsen, and so the crew decided to proceed with the flight.

At 22:30 local time, after a 20-minute delay, the aircraft took off from Moscow, heading northeast towards Petrozavodsk.

=== Approach ===
While the aircraft was entering Petrozavodsk area at a cruising altitude of 9,100 meters (29,900 ft), the ATC in Petrozavodsk relayed the updated weather information in the airport. The report stated that the visibility in the area was 2,100 meters with cloudy skies. As the weather condition met the minimum for a landing, the crew opted to continue their flight.

At 23:14 local time, Captain Fyodorov briefed the crew members on the upcoming landing in Petrozavodsk. The landing weight was calculated, and in case the aircraft failed to land at the intended destination, then it would be diverted to Pulkovo Airport. The estimated fuel on board was still enough for the flight. Each of the crews' duties was reminded and distributed, with Navigator Atayev responsible for charting the course of the flight and taking the flight onto the correct route. Before starting their descent, the crew decided to do another checklist. After finishing their tasks, the aircraft started its descent.

At 23:30 local time, Petrozavodsk ATC relayed the newest weather update to the crew. The information stated that the visibility was at 2,100 meters with haze, solid cloud cover with calm winds, and a cloud base at 560 meters. Flight Engineer Timoshenko then turned on the engine de-icing to prevent the buildup of ice. The autopilot was then disengaged, and the aircraft was flown manually. It kept descending gradually towards Petrozavodsk.

After conducting a series of bends, the aircraft was finally on its way for the final turn to the airport. The ATC commanded the crew to descent to 500 ft and cleared them for an approach with its landing gear extended. However, while telling Captain Fyodorov where to start the turn, he accidentally caused the aircraft to turn later than it was supposed to, causing the aircraft to deviate approximately 4 km from the correct course. Atayev reassured Captain Fyodorov that he would "definitely bring you out here," acknowledging that he was aware of the deviation.

To align themselves with the runway, Atayev instructed the crew to turn the aircraft towards a heading of 30 degrees, flying slightly northeast. At 23:37 local time, the aircraft was finally aligned again with the runway. Atayev then tried to confirm on the landing course, asking, "What is the landing course—12 or 15 degrees?" to which Fyodorov responded, "12 degrees, according to NOTAM." Atayev then asked Flight Engineer Timoshenko to extend the flaps. The aircraft briefly gained altitude due to Fyodorov's late nose-down input following the flaps extension, causing them to fly well over the Non-directional beacon (NDB) at an altitude of 1,440 ft instead of 1,260 ft, which prompted Atayev to order them to increase their rate of descent.

Due to crosswinds blowing from the east, Atayev asked Captain Fyodorov to increase their heading by three degrees, causing the aircraft to drift further east. However, the wind soon died down, and the crew failed to notice the change, leaving the aircraft misaligned with the runway axis. Because the crew's display still showed the airport to the right of the aircraft, Atayev assumed they remained on the correct course and continued the slight turn eastward. None of the flight crew cross-checked the flight instruments, instead relying on Atayev's verbal confirmation that they were on the proper course.

=== Crash ===
A few minutes later, as light rain began to hit the aircraft, the crew turned on the windshield wipers. The aircraft then descended way past its proper altitude. The crew expected to break through the clouds, and their attention had shifted towards the outside in order to find the runway. At this point, Atayev should've said "Assessment," which would've prompted Captain Fyodorov to search the runway until the aircraft reached the minimum decision altitude (MDA) of 360 ft, at which point they would've later decided on whether to continue the approach or to go around. Atayev never uttered the word, and the aircraft kept descending further.

The aircraft were flying at 230 ft from the ground and kept descending. Seeing this, Flight Engineer Timoshenko started to do callouts of their altitude in 10-meter increments. At around 60 meters from the ground, the altitude alarm suddenly blared off, warning the crew that they had descended dangerously lower than the minima, which was met with no reaction from the cockpit crews. They were still busy shifting their attention to the outside, attempting to spot the runway.

| 23:40:08 | Navigator Atayev | Sixty meters |
| 23:40:05 | Captain Fyodorov | I don't see it yet. I'm looking |

Atayev then stated that they were only one and a half kilometers away from the runway. Seconds later, while still breaking through the clouds, a huge snap was heard from the right. The aircraft's right-wing tip had struck a 25-meter-high pine tree at a speed of 280 km/h. The collision caught the flight crews by surprise. The aircraft's nose was suddenly raised to 16 degrees, and the aircraft banked heavily to the right. First Officer Karyakin immediately shouted, "Yob tvoyu mat!"

| 23:40:08 | Navigator Atayev | [Unintelligible] one and a half kilometers. |
| 23:40:12 | Flight engineer Timoshenko | Forty meters. |
| 23:40:12 | Commentary | Sound of impact |
| 23:40:13 | First officer Karyakin | Fuck your mother! |
| 23:40:14 | Unidentified crew member | [Unintelligble] |
| 23:40:14 | Commentary | End of recording |

The aircraft continued to strike multiple trees and flew for another 500 meters with a developing right bank before finally crashing inverted onto the A-133 Suoyarvi-Petrozavodsk federal highway, about 1,200 m (3,900 ft) short of the runway, snapping an electric line, which caused a blackout in the local community and at Petrozavodsk Airport. The aircraft broke apart into multiple sections.

=== Immediate aftermath ===
The crash triggered a massive explosion that rattled the surrounding area, prompting residents from nearby dachas to rush outside in search of its cause. On the adjacent federal highway, traffic quickly ground to a halt as stunned motorists witnessed the disaster unfold. Several passengers were violently ejected from the aircraft, while others managed to escape the wreckage on their own. Among the survivors was flight attendant Yulia Skortsova, the only crew member to survive, who was initially trapped in the aisle before managing to break free. Local residents pulled several survivors from the wreckage moments before leaking fuel ignited further explosions, engulfing the aircraft in flames. According to rescuers, several of the occupants could be still heard moaning and crying for help, but the rescuers couldn't get near to them due to the fire.

In the airport, ATC workers suddenly lost all contact with Flight 9605. Its blip had disappeared from the radar screen, prompting the controllers to put the airport's emergency team on stand-by. Around 10 minutes after the crash, they received their first call on the crash: a neighbor of one of the workers had phoned him that an airplane had crashed onto his yard. The first firefighter truck was immediately deployed to the site afterwards, followed closely by an ambulance. By 00:30 a.m., a total of 11 ambulances had arrived at the site to evacuate the survivors.

By around 01:00 on 21 June, the fire at the crash site was extinguished. Those injured were initially sent to local hospitals, but after initial treatment, the government planned to transport them on to Moscow via an Ilyushin Il-76 with doctors and psychologists on board. There were initially 44 fatalities and 8 injured survivors, all of whom in serious condition and suffered burns. Authorities stated that two of the injured could not be transported to Moscow due to the severity of their injuries and were deemed to be in critical condition. On June 21, one of the survivors, a 9-year-old boy, succumbed to his injuries. On June 25, two additional survivors died due to their severe injuries, bringing the death toll to 47.

== Response ==
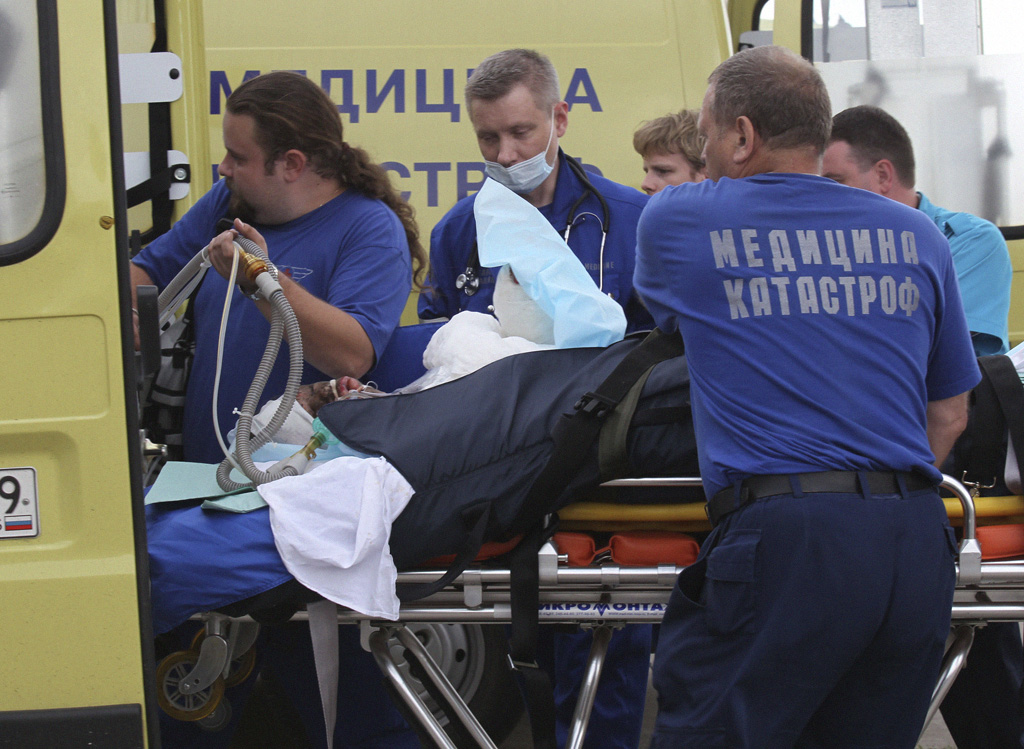
Survivors of the crash were transported to the main hospital in Petrozavodsk for further treatment

After the crash, Head of the Republic of Karelia Andrey Nelidov visited the crash site and supervised the rescue efforts. He later issued an order for financial support from his government's funds to compensate the deceased and injured victims of the crash. According to the statement, families of the deceased would be given 1 million rubles, and the injured would be given 500,000 rubles.

Russian President Dmitry Medvedev ordered two planes from EMERCOM to assist the injured. Then-Prime Minister Vladimir Putin stated that the victims and their relatives would be ensured with benefits. Minister of Health and Social Development Tatyana Golikova announced during a presidium meeting that assistance would be provided to the affected. A special flight from Moscow's Domodedovo Airport would be organized for the families of the victims. Minister of Health and Social Development of the Republic of Karelia, Valentina Ulich, stated that they would be provided with accommodation and psychologists.

Several countries offered condolences to Russia in response to the crash, including the government of Armenia, Belarus, Georgia, Lithuania, and Turkmenistan. Due to the death of Vladimir Pettay, FIFA president Sepp Blatter offered condolences to his family. The Russian Football Union later announced that they would provide support for his wife and children.

A day of national mourning was declared in Karelia for three days, starting from June 21. All celebrations and cultural events were cancelled, including the anniversary of the city of Petrozavodsk, which would have been held on June 25. The national flag of the Republic of Karelia would be flown at half-mast. At the crash site, the highway was still open for public, but the site was cordoned off. A makeshift memorial was made near the area with flowers laid down and candles were lit by families and colleagues of the victims.

Government of Moscow announced that financial assistance would be provided for the families of the victims. The same statement was also shared by the government of Samara and Sakhalin, whose residents were killed in the crash. Moscow mayor Sergey Sobyanin stated that funeral and transportation cost would be paid from the city's budget.

Following reports that a blackout at Petrozavodsk Airport had caused the crash, the Northwestern Transport Prosecutor's Office conducted an impromptu inspection on the airport. The issue was consulted with TGK-1, the company that was responsible for the airport's electrical matters, which stated that there was no problem with electricity at the time of the crash. In Bashkortostan, in response to reports of scrutiny on airport safety, officials decided to strengthen safety oversights and technical services of their respective airports.

On 23 June, at a conference of senior Russian government officials, it was announced that as a result of the incident, the government planned to remove all Tu-134s from commercial service, as well as ban the operation of aircraft carrying more than nine people or weighing more than 5,700 kilograms (12,600 lb) that do not have a ground proximity warning system. The Russian Ministry of Transport stated that the ban would also apply to Antonov An-24 and Yakovlev Yak-40 aircraft that weren't equipped with the system. The ban would start to take effect on 1 January 2012. Rosaviatsia warned Russian operators that their aircraft would be decommissioned if they were not retrofitted by said date.

== Investigation ==
=== Inclement weather ===
The investigation stated that there were discrepancies between the weather reports that the crew had received before the flight and the actual weather condition during the flight. The initial reports, marked at 19:10 and 19:30 local time, stated that the condition would be marginal, with a cloud base at roughly 130–140 m and a visibility of 2,100 m, slightly above the required minimum for a safe landing. The forecast indicated that the weather would remain the same for the remainder of the flight. However, when the crew of Flight 9605 was approaching Petrozavodsk, the weather had drastically deteriorated.

Before taking off, the weather data had actually been updated by the local meteorological office; however, this information was not immediately relayed to the crew. They had left the office earlier just before it got updated, and in order to receive the recent report, then they had to request it via radio. Had they received the report right before leaving the office, Captain Fyodorov would've likely not departed from Moscow.

The deficiencies in weather reporting in Petrozavodsk were likely caused by the lack of proper equipment in the airport. The weather equipment that was used in the airport was outdated and inadequate. According to the investigation, the cloud-based measuring devices, DVO-3, were 20 years old, and these devices, which were installed near the airport's radio beacon, belonged to the Russian Ministry of Defense and were mainly not used for civil aviation purposes. The airport worker who was responsible for the weather report would have needed to phone the technicians who were stationed at the devices and ask them to read the cloud base measurement. However, the readings were not included in the log and therefore were not documented and standardized. This contributed to the gap between the reported figure and the actual figure of the cloud base at the moment of the crash.

The investigation also revealed other critical deficiencies in the airport's meteorological infrastructure. The cloud base measuring devices were installed at the airport's main observation point, which was technically 3 km away from the glideslope, of which the crew needed to descend through to land at the airport. As a result, the reported weather conditions reflected measurements from the main observation point rather than from the glide slope itself, where the actual conditions were significantly different. Given the presence of river bends along the glide-slope area, the formation of low cloud bases and fog would have been expected along the aircraft’s approach path.

It was also revealed that Petrozavodsk Airport did not actually have visibility-measuring equipment. Instead of using standardized equipment, the airport used shield boards, which were a series of illuminated panels placed at measured distances from the observation point. At the time of the accident, only two of the nine installed boards were illuminated, indicating visibility of approximately 700 to 1,000 meters. Moreover, the main observation point was positioned in the opposite direction of Flight 9605’s landing path. As a result, the reported visibility of 2,100 meters was based on an incomplete assessment taken from the wrong direction relative to the aircraft’s approach.

=== Navigational error ===
Since the airport was lacking in equipment, including navigational tools to assist the flight crew, the pilots had to rely on radio beacons for their approach to Petrozavodsk. They would have needed to use the aircraft's Automatic Direction Finders (ADF) to locate the beacons in order to line up with the runway. However, the flight's navigator Atayev decided to use GPS instead, which was not an approved procedure. The Tupolevs, including the type that was used in the flight, were equipped with the KLN-90B GPS device. While it could be used as a supplementary device for navigation, the instruction manual explicitly prohibited pilots from using it for approaches.

Atayev likely had decided to use the GPS as a primary guidance tool due to beliefs that it was more accurate and easier to use. However, unbeknownst to him, the coordinates he had entered into the system caused it to guide the aircraft toward a point approximately 130 meters to the right of, and 70 meters beyond, the actual runway threshold. This error originated from the use of two different geodetic systems. The Tu-134's GPS used the WGS-84 system, which is the international standard for civil aviation. Petrozavodsk Airport, on the other hand, still published its coordinates in the older Soviet-era SK-42 system. This meant that the crew had to convert the coordinates before putting them into the GPS.

Atayev did not notice the offset, as he entered the published coordinates of Petrozavodsk without prior conversion. As a result, the GPS treated the SK-42 values as WGS-84 coordinates, producing the 130-meter lateral offset. Atayev had not cross-checked the instruments to confirm the aircraft's lateral position relative to the airport. The aircraft's Automatic Radio Compass (ARC), which was tuned to the actual radio beacons, would have shown the crew that they had deviated from the flight path. Moreover, this condition was worsened by a weakening crosswind at lower altitudes; the crew's continued right-bank input to counter the earlier drift caused the aircraft to stray further toward the right of the runway centerline.

=== CRM breakdown ===
A post-mortem forensic examination revealed that Atayev had a blood alcohol level of 0.81‰, corresponding to mild intoxication during the flight. The effects were evident on the cockpit voice recorder, where Atayev was notably more talkative, impatient, and directive toward Captain Fyodorov, who was the pilot flying. At several points, he could be heard hurrying the crew to turn the aircraft toward the airport and directing them to obey his orders.

Assessment of the human factors indicated that the roles of the crew members had effectively switched during the flight, with Atayev, the flight navigator, becoming the de facto commander making the decisions, and Captain Fyodorov acting as the executor. The investigation noted a steep, inverted authority gradient throughout the flight, in which the junior crew members subordinated themselves to the most senior crew member with the most experience, who in this case was Atayev. Despite being the captain of the flight, Fyodorov obeyed every order from Atayev, who did not hold the legal authority to command the aircraft. The actual second-in-command, First Officer Karyakin, was described by investigators as effectively removed from the active control loop, remaining silent and passive throughout the final approach.

As Atayev had made mistakes during the approach that caused the aircraft to stray off course, the remaining crew members could have recommended a go-around. Atayev, however, reassured them that he would "get them out" and would line the aircraft up with the runway again. Because he was the most experienced crew member, the others accepted his reassurance and allowed him to remain the decision-maker, which led them to stop cross-checking the lateral navigation instruments, which would have clearly shown the aircraft had strayed far off course.

The condition was aggravated by Atayev's fixation on lateral navigation at the expense of the vertical profile, which later allowed the aircraft to descend below the proper glide path. After realizing he had caused the aircraft to track off course, Atayev became singularly focused on realigning it with the runway. The GPS system he was using required more attention than the ARC needles, drawing his focus further away from other instruments, though he still managed to calculate the required descent rate for the glide path.

The aircraft descended faster than the rate Atayev had set. Approximately 3 km from the runway threshold, the aircraft crossed below the glide path. Atayev should have alerted the crew and ordered the descent arrested, but he did not. First Officer Karyakin, as second-in-command, should have raised the issue, but he remained silent. The aircraft eventually reached 140 meters, the altitude at which the navigator should have called "assessment." This callout is crucial, as it triggers a formal role transfer between the pilots: Captain Fyodorov would shift his scan outside the cockpit to visually locate the runway, while First Officer Karyakin would take over active monitoring of the instruments. In Flight 9605, this did not happen. Fyodorov instead attempted both roles simultaneously, trying to locate the airport and monitor the instruments at the same time. Karyakin again remained passive.

Flight 9605 eventually reached the decision altitude of 110 meters, at which the pilots had to decide whether to abandon the approach or continue based on whether they had visually acquired the runway. Atayev should have announced that they had reached the decision altitude, Captain Fyodorov should have decided whether to go around or continue, and First Officer Karyakin was required by procedure to initiate a go-around if Fyodorov failed to make a decision. None of the three happened, and the aircraft continued to descend.

At an altitude of merely 60 meters above the ground, the radio altimeter's "Dangerous Altitude" warning triggered. The crew did not respond to the alarm. Captain Fyodorov was heard calmly saying, "I don't see it yet. I'm looking," suggesting his attention remained fixated on visually acquiring the runway rather than processing the alarm as a critical warning. The proper procedure explicitly required an immediate go-around as soon as the alarm sounded. All the crew members were likely fixated on finding the runway. The right wing eventually struck a tree and was destroyed, causing the aircraft to roll past 90 degrees before striking the ground.

=== Conclusion ===
In September 2011, the Interstate Aviation Committee published its report into the crash. The primary cause of the accident was found to be the decision by the crew to conduct the approach in meteorological conditions that were below the minimum allowed for the airfield, the aircraft, and the pilot in command. The failure of the crew to go-around and their descent below the minimum safe altitude in absence of visual contact with the approach lights or ground resulted in the collision with trees and the ultimate impact with the ground.

The contributing factors included:

- Poor crew resource management during the approach, expressed in the captain’s submission to the navigator’s will, the latter being increasingly active under the influence of a mild alcohol intoxication, and the actual removal of the second pilot from the aircraft control loop at the final stage of approach;
- Navigator's performance under a mild alcohol intoxication (0.08%);
- A discrepancy between the weather forecast for visibility, cloud base and fog at Petrozavodsk and the actual weather conditions prevailing at the time of the crash.
- Failure to use the automatic direction finder (ADF) and other equipment for an integrated control of the airplane during the final approach, while using the satellite navigation system, KLN-90B (in violation of the Airplane Flight Manual which prohibits the use of GPS information during final approach).

== Aftermath ==
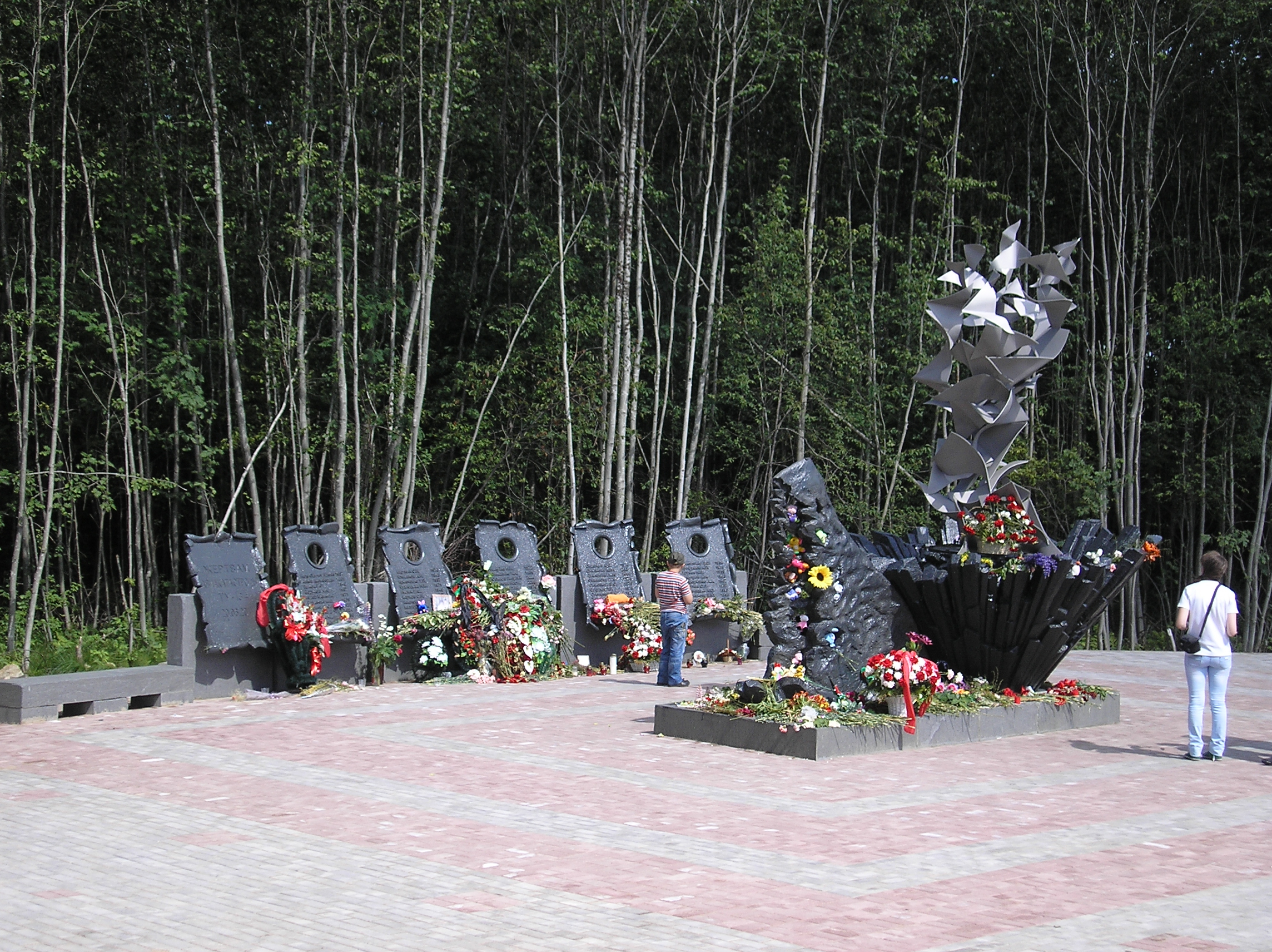
The memorial to the victims erected next to the crash site

=== Trial ===
Under the Russian Criminal Code, a case was opened immediately after the crash. In August 2015, the first hearing for the case was held. Several officials were tried, including Rosaviatsia official Eduard Voitovsky, former head of Petrozavodsk Airport Vladimir Shkarupa, and head of the airport's aviation meteorological station Vladimir Pronin. Both Skharupa and Pronin were charged with accusations of violating traffic safety and air transport operation regulations, while Voitovsky was charged with negligence. The crew members of Flight 9605 were initially given charges, but they were later dropped.

The probe concluded that the outdated radar information that was given to the crew had violated flight safety and regulations regarding air transport. The investigation also criticized the operational certification of Petrozavodsk Airport, which was deemed to be inadequate. The defendants pleaded not guilty to their charges.

In 2017, all three were found guilty by the Court of Karelia and were sentenced to five years of suspended imprisonment. They were later given amnesty and immediately released from prison, with their criminal records expunged.

=== Memorial ===
On 20 June 2012, the first anniversary of the disaster, a memorial was unveiled at the crash site. The ceremony was attended by Deputy Head of the Republic of Karelia, Valentina Ulich, as well as members of Rosatom. The memorial, designed by Karelian native Alexander Kim, was consisted of the aircraft's tail, an imagined explosion from the crash, and a stele with images of 47 birds flying into the sky, symbolizing the 47 lives lost in the disaster. Several plaques bearing the names of the 47 names were also installed around the sculpture.

== See also ==
- Aeroflot Flight 821
