= Military-Construction Complex of the Ministry of Defence of Russia =

The Military Construction Complex of the Ministry of Defence of the Russian Federation is an organisation of the Ministry of Defence of the Russian Federation. It is designed to provide engineering support for military infrastructure facilities, billeting of troops, assist deployment of the Armed Forces of the Russian Federation and to conduct combat operations.

== History ==
After the beginning of the German Operation Barbarossa, the invasion of the Soviet Union on 22 June 1941, the Red Army needed additional construction forces. In October 1941, the State Committee for Defence (GKO) issued a decree establishing six combat engineer armies (Sapper armies) which would include 15 combat engineer brigades of 19 battalions each (including 2 training ones). They were tasked to construct strategic rear defensive lines and rapidly train skilled specialists for the new formations of engineer troops. They were manned primarily by reservists with a construction specialty, called to the colours.

In June 1949, the Union of Soviet Socialist Republics decided to merge the military construction structures into a single Military Construction Complex of the Soviet Armed Forces and create the position of Deputy Minister of Defence for Construction and Billeting of Troops. The first incumbent was Colonel General Vasily Belokoskov, formerly in charge of all road construction and road management. The Main Construction Directorate (of the Ministry of Defence of the USSR), Material Assets Directorate, and Apartment Maintenance Directorate were transferred from the Chief of the Rear of the Armed Forces to his subordination.

A unified military construction complex was created on the basis of the Defensive Construction Directorate, Central Airfield Construction Directorate, the Main Directorate of Military Construction (Glavvoenstroy), and the Main Directorate of Naval Construction (Glavvoenmorstroy), encompassing all types of activities supporting capital construction for all branches of the Armed Forces, special forces, and services under a single, centralized command.

In 1973 U.S. intelligence assessments wrote:

The Deputy Minister of Defence for Construction and Billeting coordinates the activities of specialized construction and quartering agencies at all echelons of the military establishment. Through his subordinate directorates he allocates materials, equipment, and personnel for construction activities and exercises policy control over the acquisition, provision, assignment, and repair of military housing as well as service and cultural facilities. He also coordinates the activities of military and nonmilitary construction agencies and authorizes the use of military construction troops for non-military projects when necessary. The principal directorates within the Ministry of Defence directly subordinate to the Deputy Minister for Construction and Billeting are the Main Military Construction Directorate, the Billeting and Maintenance Directorate, and the Technical Directorate for Capital Construction.

There were eight or so Higher Schools for construction troops:

- Leningrad Higher Military Engineering Construction School. This school was named for Army General V. M. Komarovskiy in 1974, and is now the Military Engineering-Technical University
- Tolyatti Higher Military Construction Command School
- Kamyshin Higher Military Construction Command School
- Gor'kiy Higher Military Construction Command School
- Pushkin Higher Military Construction Engineering School
- Volga Military Construction Technical School (3 years)
- Simferopol' Higher Military-Political Construction School
- Tallin Higher Military-Political Construction School

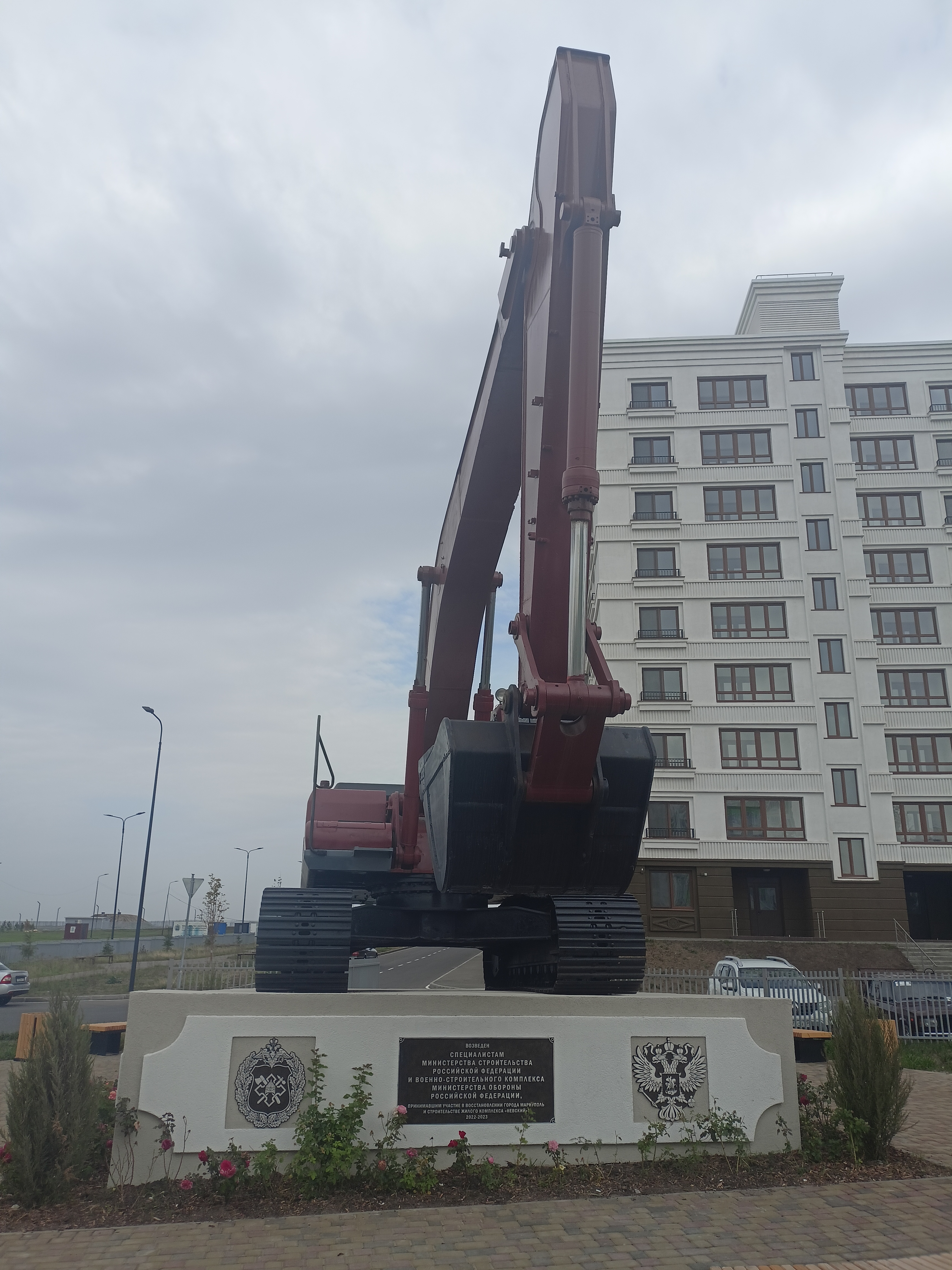
Excavator-monument to the Military Construction Troops and the Construction Complex of the Ministry of Defence of Russia, Mariupol, temporarily occupied Ukraine, 2023.

After the Chornobyl disaster of April 1986 in Ukraine, in which there was a nuclear accident, the Construction and Billeting Troops were involved in the large-scale Soviet Armed Forces response to the disaster. However, details of their involvement in the English-language scholarly literature were limited, even five years after the events.

In November 2019, specialist personnel of the Military-Construction Complex completed the reconstruction of the artificial coating of the runway of Petrozavodsk Airport.

== Leadership ==
- 1949-1958 Colonel General Vasily Belokoskov — Deputy Minister of Defence for Construction and Billeting of Troops;
- 1958-1963 Colonel General A. I. Shebunin — Deputy Minister of Defence for Construction and Billeting of Troops;
- 1963-1973 Army General Aleksandr Komarovsky — Deputy Minister of Defence for Construction and Billeting of Troops;
- 1974-1978 Marshal of Engineer Troops Archil Gelovani — Deputy Minister of Defence for Construction and Billeting of Troops;
- 1978-1988 Marshal of Engineering Troops Nikolai Shestopalov — Deputy Minister of Defence for Construction and Billeting of Troops;
- 1988-1993 Colonel General Nikolai Chekov — Deputy Minister of Defence for Construction and Billeting of Troops;
- 1993-1997 Colonel General Anatoly Solomatin — Deputy Minister of Defence for Construction and Billeting of Troops;
- 1997-2003 General of the Army Aleksandr Kosovan — Deputy Minister of Defence for Construction and Billeting of Troops;
- 2003-2007 General of the Army Anatoly Grebenyuk — Head of the Billeting and Accommodation Service of the Ministry of Defence
