= Shuya (Karelia) =

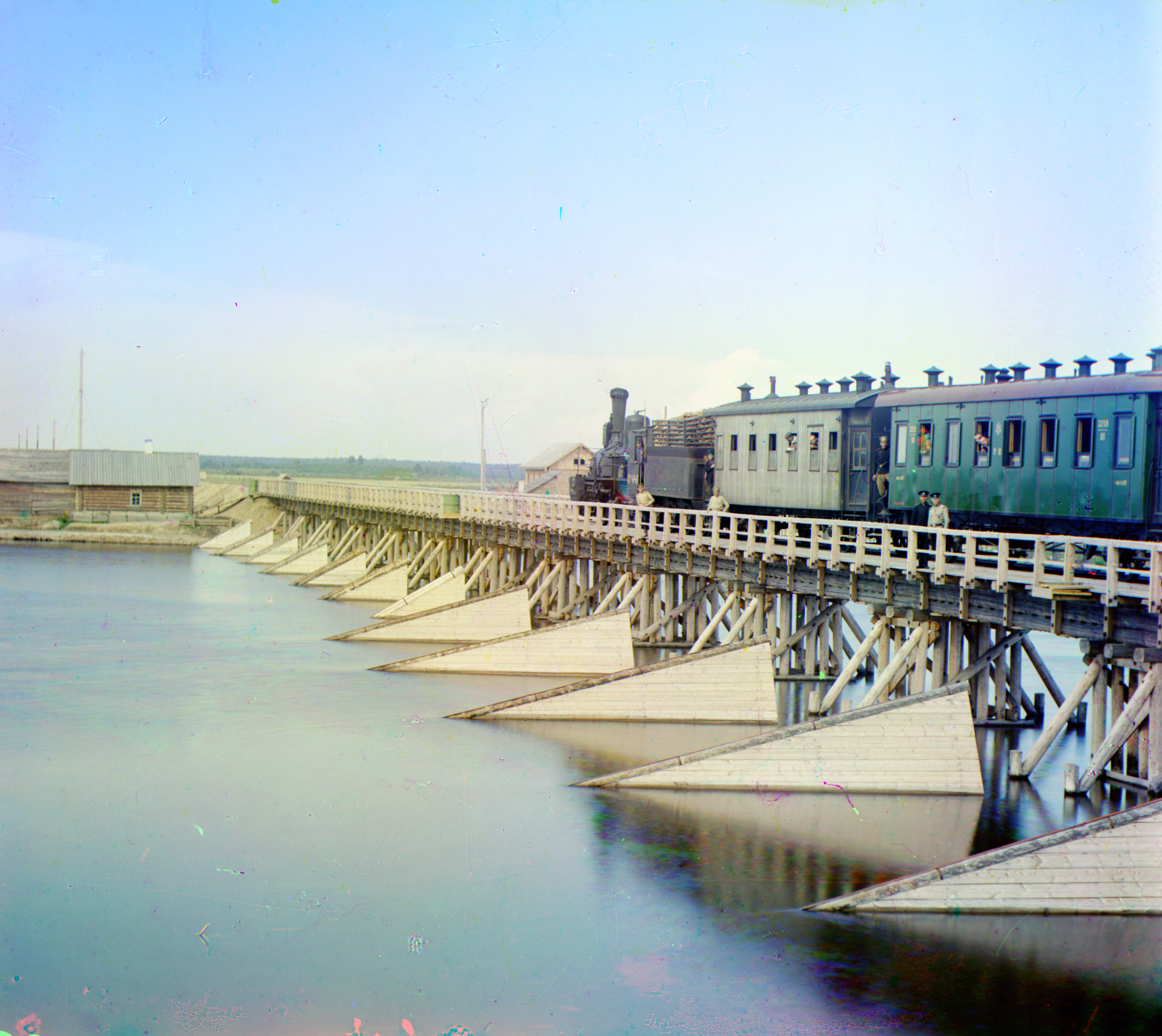
- Early 20th-century photo of a bridge across the Shuya.

Location
- Country: Russia

Physical characteristics
- Source
  - location: Lake Suoyarvi
- Mouth: Lake Logmozero
  - coordinates: 61.8785°N 34.2965°E
- Length: 194 km (121 mi)
- Basin size: 10,100 km^{2} (3,900 sq mi)
- Discharge
  - average: 130 m^{3}/s (4,600 cu ft/s)

Basin features
- Progression: Lake Logmozero→ Lake Onega→ Svir→ Lake Ladoga→ Neva→ Gulf of Finland

The Shuya (Russian: Шуя; Finnish: Suojoki, also Suoju) is a river in the Republic of Karelia in Russia. The length of the river is 194 km. The area of its basin is 10,100 km^{2}. The Shuya flows out of Lake Suoyarvi and discharges into Lake Logmozero, which is connected with Lake Onega by a 0.8 km watercourse. The river freezes up between November and January and stays icebound until April or the first half of May.

It is the world's only river to change course from 15 to 20 times a year.

== Settlements ==
Settlements by the river include Shuya, Matrosy, Sodder, Ignoyla and Suoyoki. Pryazha and Petrozavodsk are also close to it.
