= Petrozavodsk Airport =

Airport in Karelia, Russia

Petrozavodsk Airport Karelian: Petroskoin Lendoazema

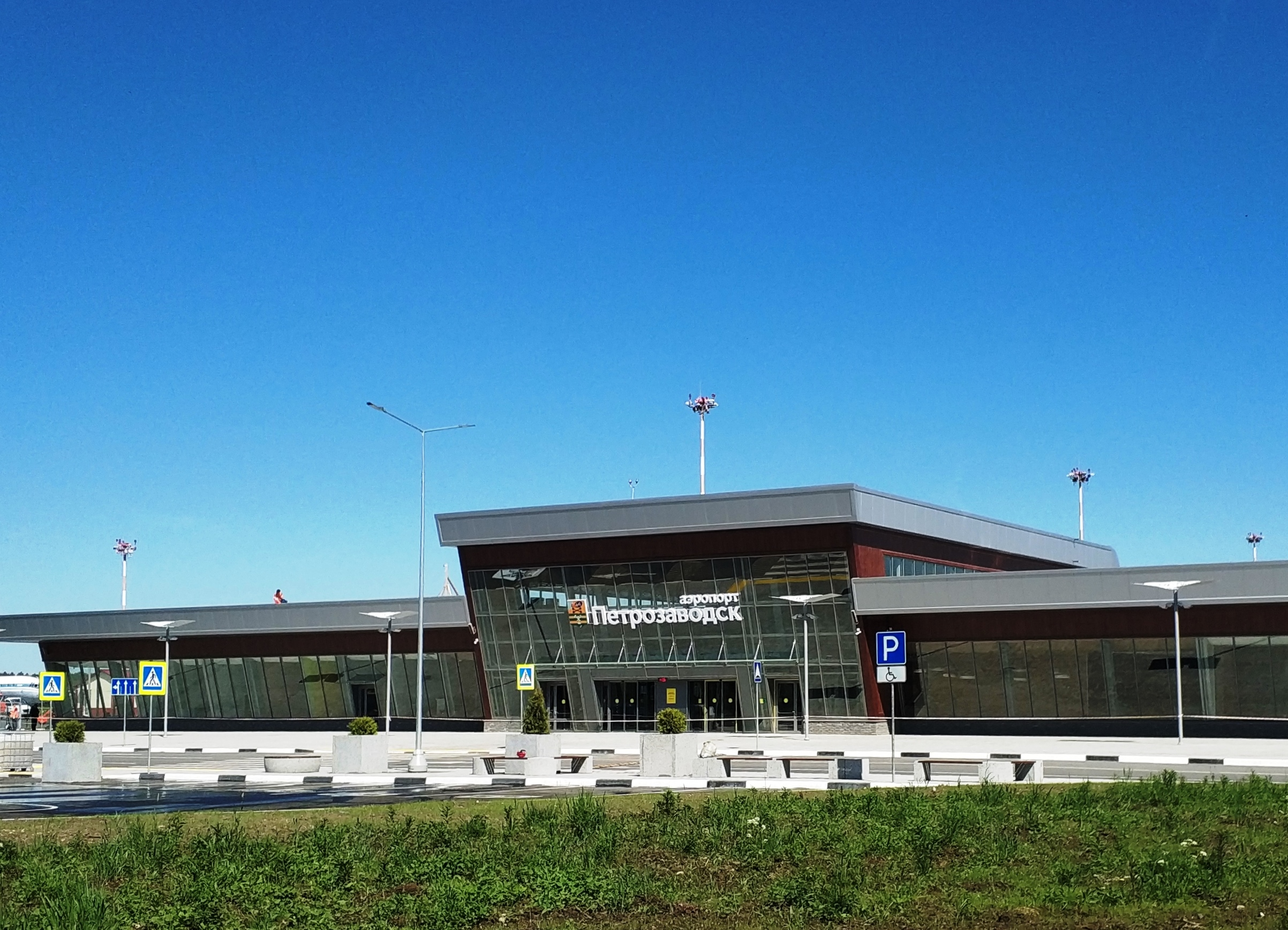
- IATA: PES; ICAO: ULPB

Summary
- Airport type: Civil/military
- Operator: Ministry of Economic Development of the Republic of Karelia
- Serves: Petrozavodsk
- Location: Besovets, Republic of Karelia, Russia
- Elevation AMSL: 151 ft / 46 m
- Coordinates: 61°53′6″N 34°9′24″E
- Website: karelavia.ru

Map
- Shown within Republic of Karelia, Russia Petrozavodsk (Russia)

Runways
Direction	Length		Surface
Direction	m	ft	Surface
01/19	2,500	8,202	Concrete

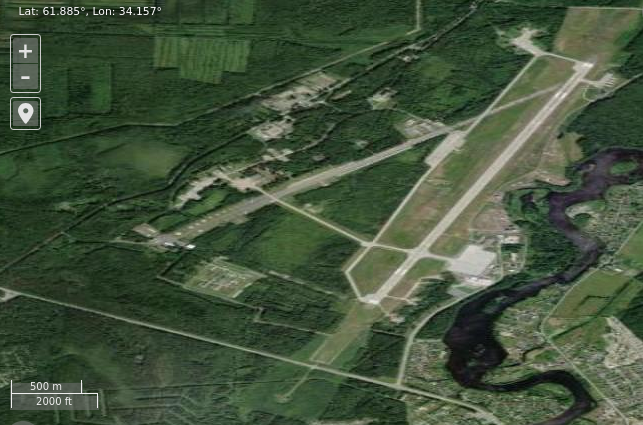
Satellite imagery of Petrozavodsk Airport

Petrozavodsk Airport (Karelian: Petroskoin lendoazema, Russian: Аэропорт Петрозаводск, Finnish: Petroskoin lentoasema; (IATA: PES, ICAO: ULPB); ex: Besovets, Petrozavodsk-2) is a joint civil-military airport in Republic of Karelia (Russia) located 12 kilometres (7.5 mi) northwest of Petrozavodsk in Besovets, Shuya Rural Settlement (municipality). It services small airliners. It is a minor airfield with 12 parking stands and a small amount of tarmac space.

The airfield has seen military use as an interceptor base. During the 1960s or 1970s, Sukhoi Su-15 aircraft were based at Besovets. During the 1970s, it was home to the 991st Fighter Aviation Regiment (991 IAP), which flew Mikoyan-Gurevich MiG-25 'Foxbat' aircraft. In 1992–93, the 159th Guards Fighter Aviation Regiment (159 IAP) transferred in from Poland, having left the 4th Air Army. As of 2019 it flies the Sukhoi Su-35S aircraft and is now part of the 105th Guards Mixed Aviation Division, 6th Air and Air Defence Forces Army.

In November 2019, specialists of the Military-Construction Complex of the Ministry of Defence of Russia completed the reconstruction of the artificial coating of the runway of the airfield.

== Airlines and destinations ==
=== Passenger ===
As of July 2025 Petrozavodsk Airport serves following flights:

Airlines	Destinations
Azimuth	Moscow–Vnukovo
Severstal Air Company	Moscow–Domodedovo, Moscow–Sheremetyevo, Yekaterinburg; Seasonal: Kaliningrad, Makhachkala, Mineralnye Vody, Minsk, Sochi
UVT Aero	Seasonal: Kazan, Murmansk, Samara, Perm

== Accidents and incidents ==
On 20 June 2011, a RusAir Tupolev TU-134, Flight 9605, operating for RusLine, with 43 passengers and nine crew crash landed, broke up, and caught fire on a highway short of Runway 01 at Petrozavodsk Airport, while en route from Moscow to Petrozavodsk, killing 47 people and leaving five survivors.

== See also ==
- List of airports in Russia
- List of military airbases in Russia
