= Pryazha =

Pryazha Пряжа Priäžä (Karelian)
- Urban-type settlement
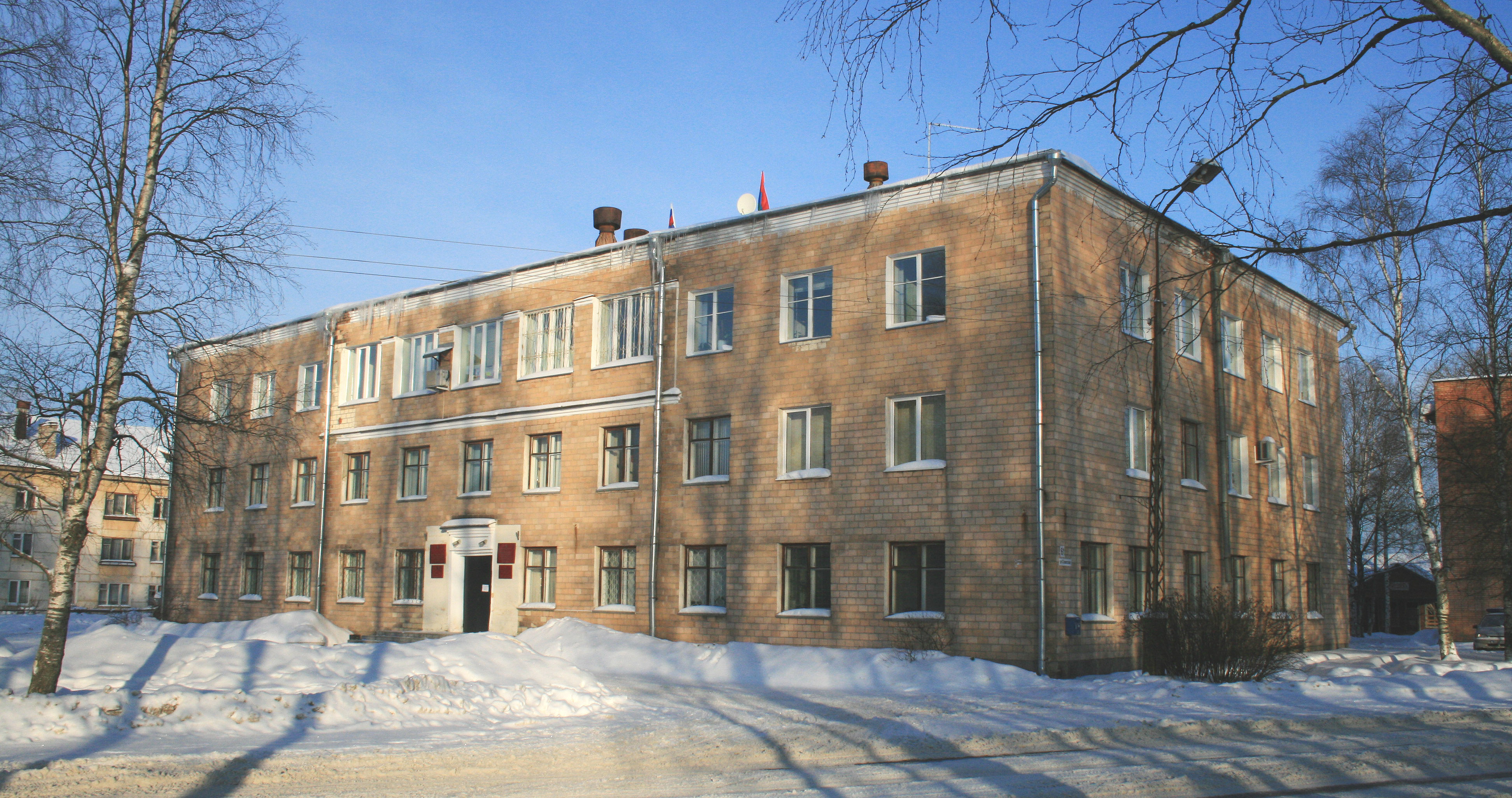
- Pryazhinsky District Administration building in Pryazha
- Interactive map of Pryazha
- Location of Pryazha Pryazha (Karelia)
- Coordinates: 61°41′N 33°37′E
- Country: Russia
- Federal subject: Republic of Karelia
- Administrative district: Pryazhinsky District
- First mentioned: 17th century
- Urban-type settlement status since: 1962

Population (2010 Census)
  - Total: 3,675
  - Estimate (2025): 2,939 (−20%)

Administrative status
  - Capital of: Pryazhinsky District

Municipal status
  - Municipal district: Pryazhinsky Municipal District
  - Urban settlement: Pryazhinskoye Urban Settlement
  - Capital of: Pryazhinsky Municipal District, Pryazhinskoye Urban Settlement
- Time zone: UTC+3 (UTC+03:00)
- Postal code: 186120
- OKTMO ID: 86639151051
- Website: pryazha.karelia.info/official/1266404376.html

Pryazha population
- 2010 Census: 3,675
- 2002 Census: 4,269
- 1989 Census: 4,421
- 1979 Census: 4,809

Pryazha (Russian: Пря́жа; Karelian: Priäžä; Finnish: Prääsä) is an urban locality (an urban-type settlement) and the administrative center of Pryazhinsky District of the Republic of Karelia, Russia, located 12 kilometers (7.5 mi) from the Shuya River and 49 kilometers (30 mi) west of Petrozavodsk, the capital of the republic. As of the 2010 Census, its population was 3,675.

== History ==
It was first mentioned in the 17th century as the village of Pryazha or Padlovo (Падлово). It was granted urban-type settlement status in 1962.

== Administrative and municipal status ==
Within the framework of administrative divisions, Pryazha serves as the administrative center of Pryazhinsky District, of which it is a part. As a municipal division, Pryazha, together with three rural localities, is incorporated within Pryazhinsky Municipal District as Pryazhinskoye Urban Settlement.

== Tourism ==
The Blue Highway, an international tourist route, starts in Mo i Rana, Norway, goes through Sweden and Finland, and then through Pryazha, before ending in Pudozh.

== Health care ==
There is a Pryazhinskaya central district polyclinic in the village. In 2005, a branch of the state healthcare institution «V. A. Baranov Republican Hospital» with a rehabilitation treatment center was opened in Pryazha.

Inpatient departments of the hospital:

- department of speech pathology and neurorehabilitation for 60 beds;
- therapeutic for 30 beds;
- surgical with 22 beds with an operating unit and intensive care unit.
