= Pryazhinsky District =

Pryazhinsky District Пряжинский район (Russian)
- District
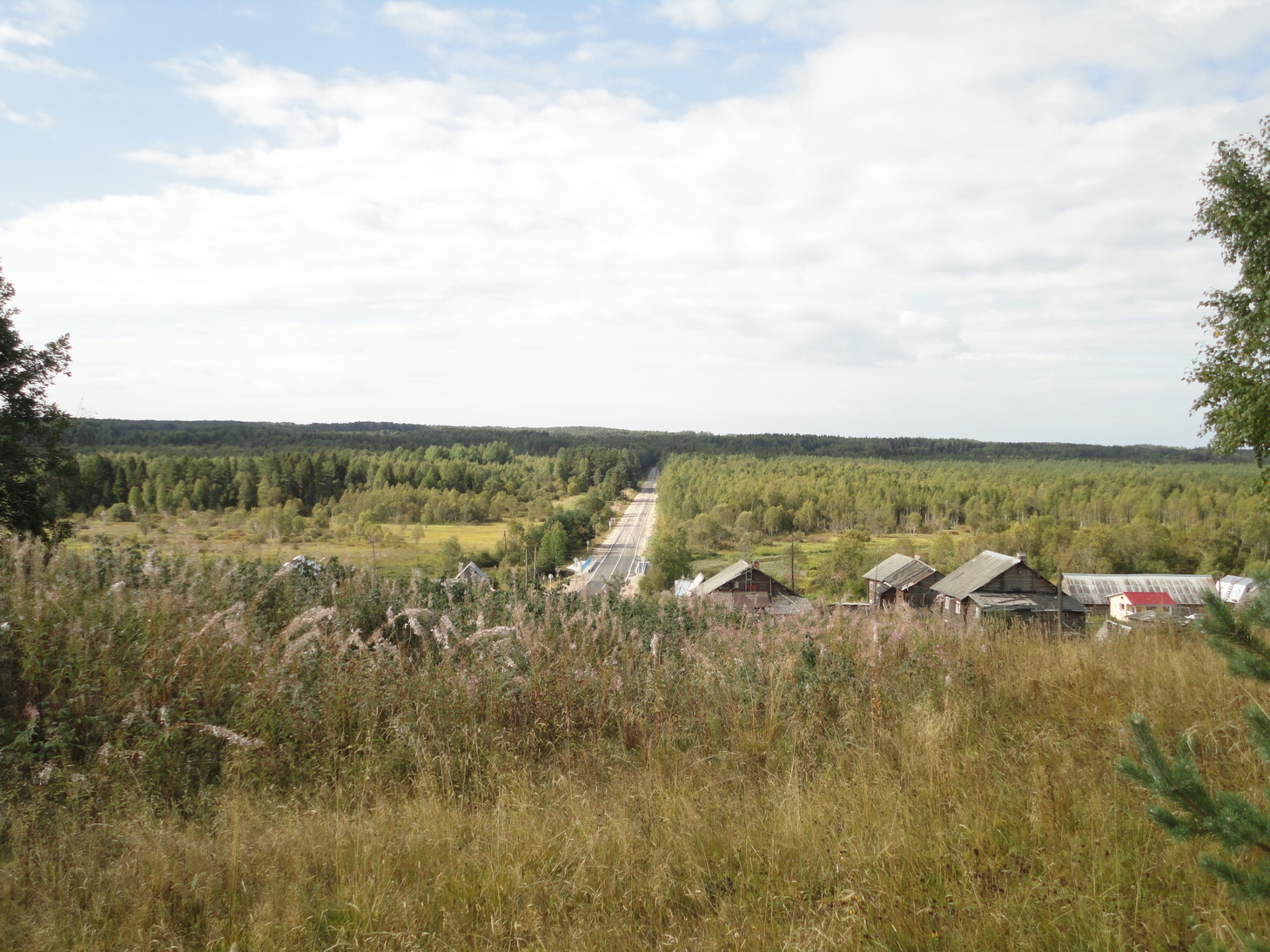
- View of the village of Manga and the R21 regional road in Pryazhinsky District

- Coat of arms
- Location of Pryazhinsky District in the Republic of Karelia
- Coordinates: 61°42′N 33°37′E
- Country: Russia
- Federal subject: Republic of Karelia
- Established: 28 February 1930
- Administrative center: Pryazha

Area
  - Total: 6,389 km^{2} (2,467 sq mi)

Population (2010 Census)
  - Total: 14,664
  - Density: 2.295/km^{2} (5.945/sq mi)
  - Urban: 25.1%
  - Rural: 74.9%

Administrative structure
  - Inhabited localities: 1 urban-type settlements, 81 rural localities

Municipal structure
  - Municipally incorporated as: Pryazhinsky Municipal District
  - Municipal divisions: 1 urban settlements, 6 rural settlements
- Time zone: UTC+3 (UTC+03:00)
- OKTMO ID: 86639000
- Website: http://pryazha.karelia.info

Population of Pryazhinsky District
- 2010 Census: 14,664
- 2002 Census: 18,224
- 1989 Census: 22,880
- 1979 Census: 24,266

Pryazhinsky District (Russian: Пря́жинский райо́н; Karelian: Priäžän piiri) is an administrative district (raion), one of the fifteen in the Republic of Karelia, Russia. It is located in the south of the republic. The area of the district is 6,389 square kilometers (2,467 sq mi). Its administrative center is the urban locality (an urban-type settlement) of Pryazha. As of the 2010 Census, the total population of the district was 14,664, with the population of Pryazha accounting for 25.1% of that number.

== Administrative and municipal status ==
Within the framework of administrative divisions, Pryazhinsky District is one of the fifteen in the Republic of Karelia and has administrative jurisdiction over one urban-type settlement (Pryazha) and eighty-one rural localities. As a municipal division, the district is incorporated as Pryazhinsky Municipal District. The urban-type settlement of Pryazha and three rural localities are incorporated into an urban settlement, while the remaining seventy-eight rural localities are incorporated into six rural settlements within the municipal district. The urban-type settlement of Pryazha serves as the administrative center of both the administrative and municipal district.
