= Russian wooden architecture =

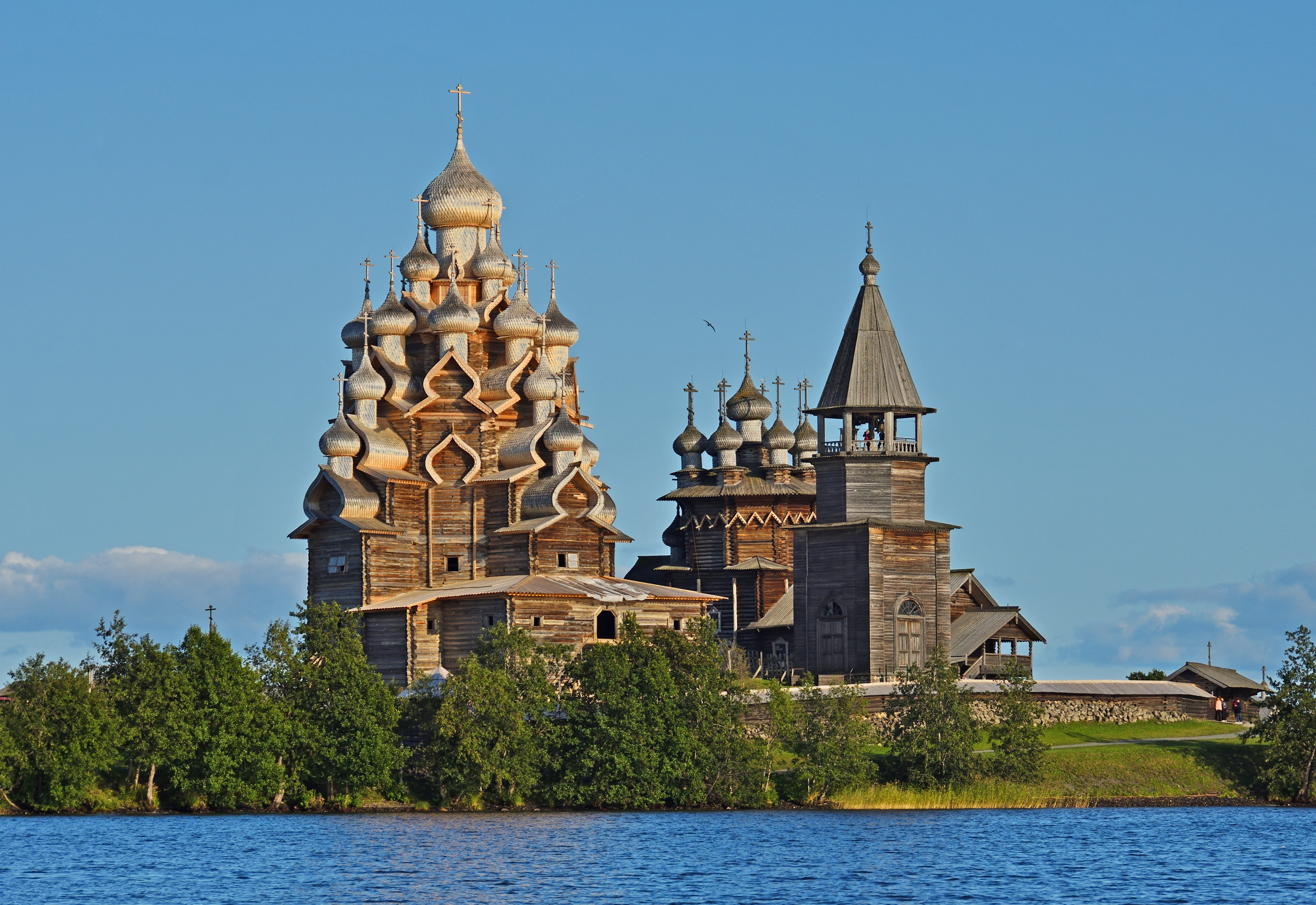
The architectural ensemble of the Kizhi Pogost in Karelia. On the left is the twenty-two-domed Church of Holy Transfiguration (1714) — the peak of Russian wooden architecture

Russian wooden architecture (Russian: ру́сское деревя́нное зо́дчество, romanized: russkoye derevyannoye zodchestvo) (Note: The Russian word zodchestvo is the same as architecture. It comes from Old Russian, Church Slavonic зьдъчии (zdchii) — potter, builder, mason, and this one derives from zid' — clay, brick wall.) is a traditional architectural movement in Russia, that has stable and pronounced structural, technical, architectural and artistic features determined by wood as the main material. Sometimes this concept includes wooden buildings of professional architecture, eclectic buildings combining elements of folk architecture and professional architecture, as well as modern attempts to revive Old Russian carpentry traditions. It is one of the most original phenomena of Russian culture. It is widespread from the Kola Peninsula to the Central Zone, in the Urals and Siberia; a large number of monuments are located in the Russian North.

The structural basis of traditional Russian wooden architecture was a log house made of untrimmed wood. Wood carvings placed on structurally significant elements served as decoration. Among the traditional buildings are wooden cage, tent, step, cuboid and multi-domed churches, which together with peasant dwellings, household, fortress and engineering buildings defined the image of a traditional Russian settlement.

The origins of Russian wooden architecture go back to the architecture of the Early Slavs. In Old Russian architecture, religious wooden architecture was oriented on the Byzantine canon and adopted the features of stone temples. The highest development of Russian wooden architecture reached the Russian North in the 15th–18th centuries. In this region the traditions were preserved for the longest time, but even there the architecture could not escape the significant influence of the dominant architectural styles of baroque, classicism, eclecticism. In the 19th century, the motives of the Russian wooden architecture were applied in the Russian style. The heritage of wooden architecture is rapidly disappearing. Only a few religious buildings date back to the 14th–16th centuries. The oldest preserved residential buildings date back to the 18th century. According to experts, at the beginning of the 21st century, the situation with the preservation of monuments is catastrophic.

== Origins of wood architecture ==
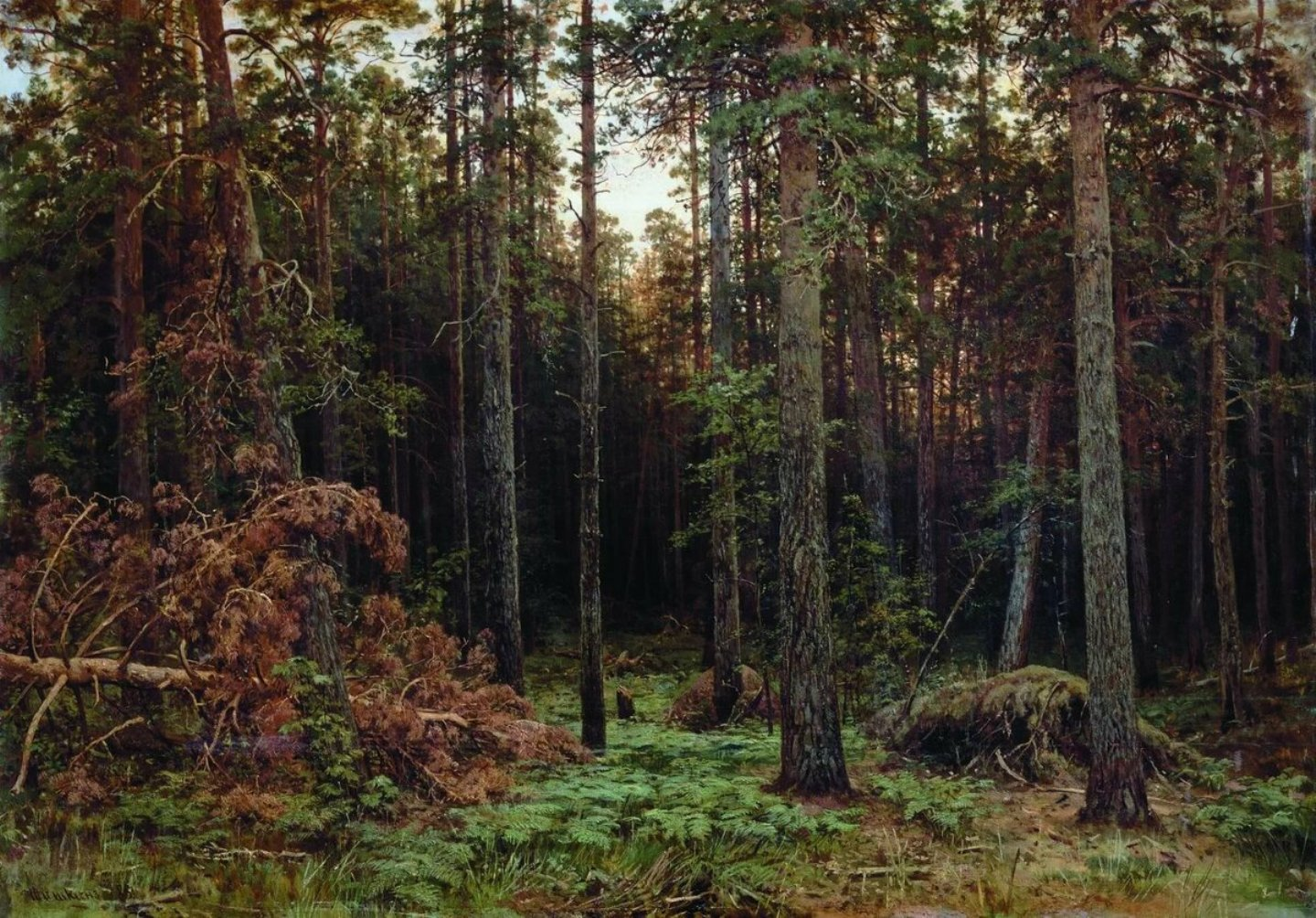
A Pine Forest by Ivan Shishkin, 1885

Ethnographer K. Moshinsky wrote about the "wooden age" of the Slavs because, in their culture, wood occupied a special place and was used in almost any craft or occupation, including construction. The reason for this is not only the woodworking and its availability for the widest strata of the population but also the fact that it is easy to process, allows for quick building, and has low thermal conductivity. The importance of wood in construction and architecture increased with the settlement of East Slavs tribes to the north and northeast, where coniferous forests, most suitable for construction, grew abundantly. As for other materials, rocks in the forest zone of European Russia are found in the form of sandstone and limestone layers relatively deeply buried in the soil, only occasionally protruding on the banks of rivers, or in the form of boulders scattered in the forests, which were difficult to use as the main material for construction. In Russia, brick, was not known until the 10th century, but then for many centuries, it was used only for structures of exceptional importance due to the high costs associated with it.

Over time, the basis of wooden architecture for the Russians became the log cabin. It is not known exactly when the log cabin technique emerged, but it was familiar to the peoples of Northern and Eastern Europe back in the Bronze Age (perhaps even in the Neolithic). Apparently, in these cold regions, they appreciated the heat-saving properties of the log cabin in comparison with wooden framing. The development of log construction was facilitated by the spread of coniferous wood. In addition to Russia, log buildings are widespread in Central and Eastern Europe and Scandinavia. The log churches of Ukraine (Ukrainian wooden churches), the Carpathians (Carpathian wooden churches), as well as Finland and Sweden, stand out. In most other countries, wooden architecture is based on a frame structural system.

== Early Slavic construction ==
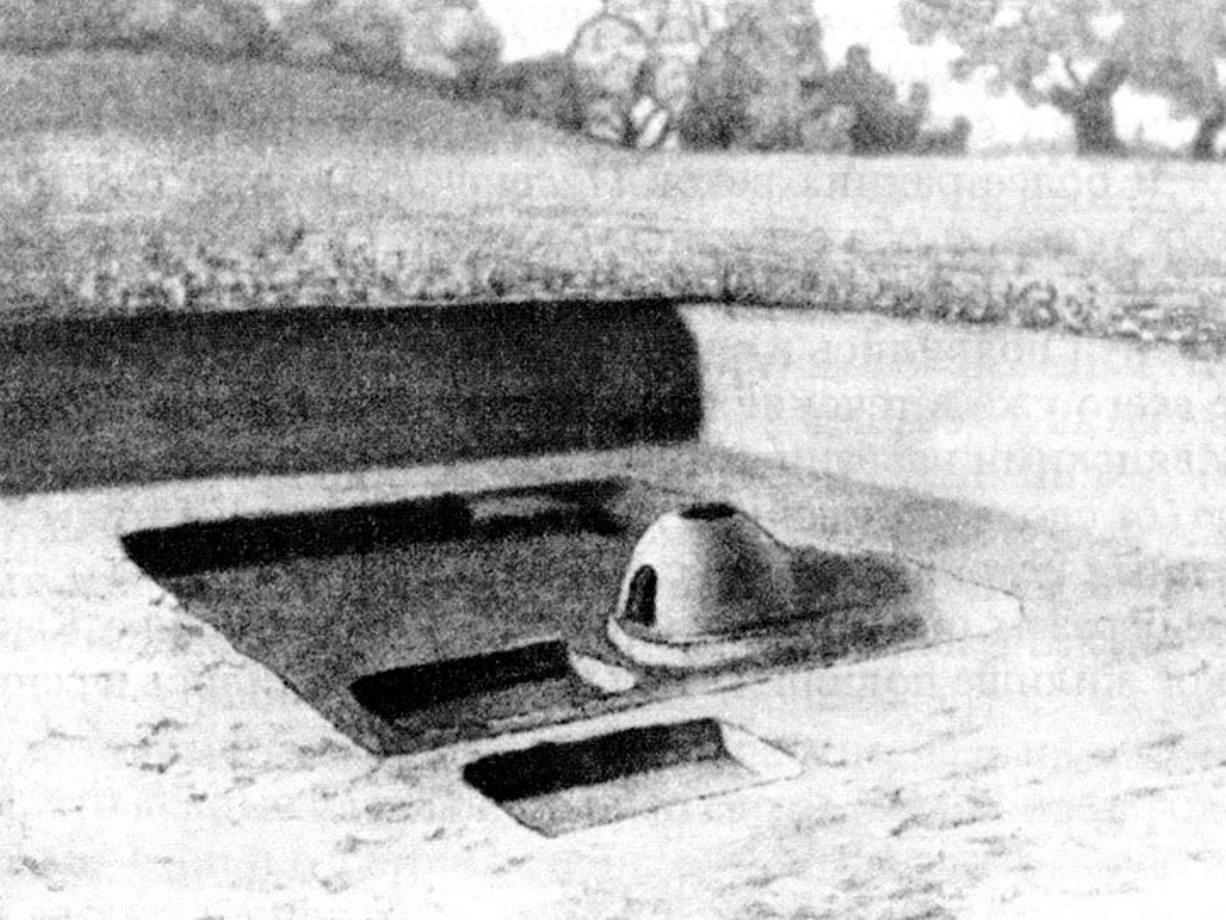
Excavated remains of a dwelling of the Romensko-Borshchevsk type

According to archaeological data, early Slavs dwellings were both entirely above-ground houses and buildings with a slight lowering of the floor level relative to the ground level, known as foundation pits. The former are known from excavations of West Slavic settlements in the territory of modern Poland; they were most often log houses (Sukow-Dziedzice culture). The latter occupied the south of the forest zone and forest-steppe on the territory of modern Belarus, Ukraine, and the southwestern regions of Russia in the 5th–10th centuries (Prague, Korchak, Penkovka, Ipotești–Cândești, later Volyntsevo, and Romensko-Borshchev cultures). Among them, there were both log houses and frame (frame-pillar) houses. In archaeology, the term poluzemlyanka (half-sod house) is used for them. Foundation pits of these dwellings had an average depth of 0.3-1.2 m and were usually square-shaped, oriented to the cardinal directions. The excavation areas varied from 6 to 20 m^{2}. There was a stove or a hearth in the corner of the room. Log walls were built of logs, less often of lumber, and were cut in the "lob" and "paw" methods. Frame walls consisted of poles and filling with horizontally laid laths (wattles could also be used). Sometimes the walls were coated with clay and/or covered with whitewash.

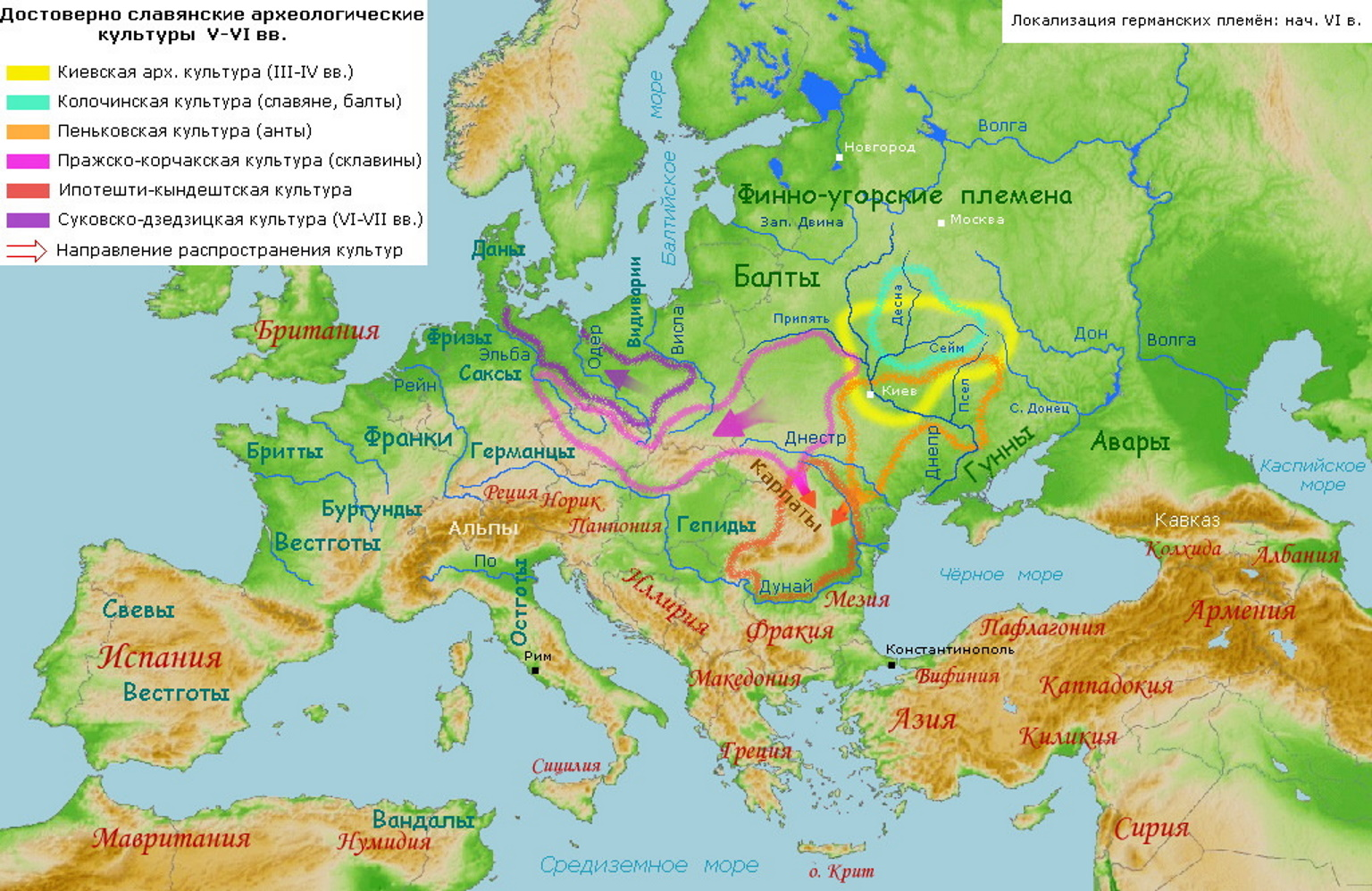
Presumably early Slavic archaeological cultures

From the mid-20th century until recently, dwellings with a deepened floor were commonly reconstructed into one-chamber low “half-dwellings,” with the above-ground walls matching the slope of the excavation. By the early 21st century, however, the term poluzemlyanka (Note: In research, the term poluzemlyanka traditionally referred to the remains of any ancient structure with an uncertain appearance, typically identified by a buried foundation pit. The shallow depth of these dwellings’ burial indicates that a significant portion of their walls rose above the ground, meaning the roof likely did not rest on the ground. Even P. A. Rappoport, who used the term, acknowledged its conventional nature. The term itself was artificially created by scholars.) was deemed incorrect for any buildings with a buried floor. A new approach to reconstructing these dwellings emerged, suggesting that many originally had log walls set back from the foundation pit. The found frame-pillar constructions might have been remnants of recliners or benches along the walls, indicating that the dwelling's area was somewhat larger than the excavation itself. Additionally, some researchers suggest that two-storey houses existed as early as the 9th century.

Household buildings were similar to dwellings.

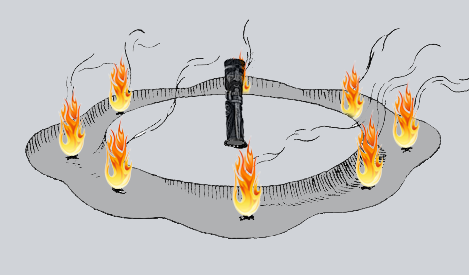
Pagan sanctuary in Peryn near Novgorod, according to the reconstruction of archaeologist V. V. Sedov.

In the second half of the 1st millennium AD, the Slavs gradually moved deeper into the forest zone and settled in the Pskov-Novgorod region. Excavations at the Pskov kurgans and Novgorod hills cultures revealed ground-level single-chamber houses with areas ranging from 12 to 20 m^{2}. These houses had clay and board floors, stoves in the corners, and log walls, with some featuring frame constructions combined with log walls. Most archaeologists identify these dwellings as typically Slavic. However, V. V. Sedov interprets them as evidence of Western Slavic influence, while E. M. Zagorulsky disagrees. Zagorulsky questions their Slavic origin, suggesting that the Slavs may not have settled in the Pskov-Novgorod region until the 10th century and possibly adopted building types and techniques from local Baltic and Finno-Ugric tribes. A. A. Shennikov proposed that the roots of the classical Russian log house trace back to the Dyakovo culture. Rectangular log houses were indeed common in the late period of the Dyakovo culture, alongside other types of buildings, and it is possible that these structures persisted before the arrival of the Slavs in the region. Similar houses were also found among the neighboring Balts of the late Dnieper-Dvinsky culture. By the end of the first millennium A.D., other forms of dwellings existed in the area, such as the “big houses” of Staraya Ladoga and buildings with central heating devices. However, with the onset of the new millennium, the diversity in housebuilding, which reflected the multi-ethnic nature of the region, diminished. The primary type of dwelling for the emerging Old Russian nation in the forest zone became a ground log house with a stove in the corner.

It is believed that temples were characteristic only of the Western Slavs, who built wooden structures with idols inside. In contrast, the Eastern Slavs typically revered natural objects, used sites for sacrifices, and employed burial mounds and sanctuaries (kapishcha) —round open areas with idols— as their cultic spaces. However, in Western Ukraine, remains of square-plan structures with log walls have been found, which some researchers interpret as temples.

== Construction organization ==
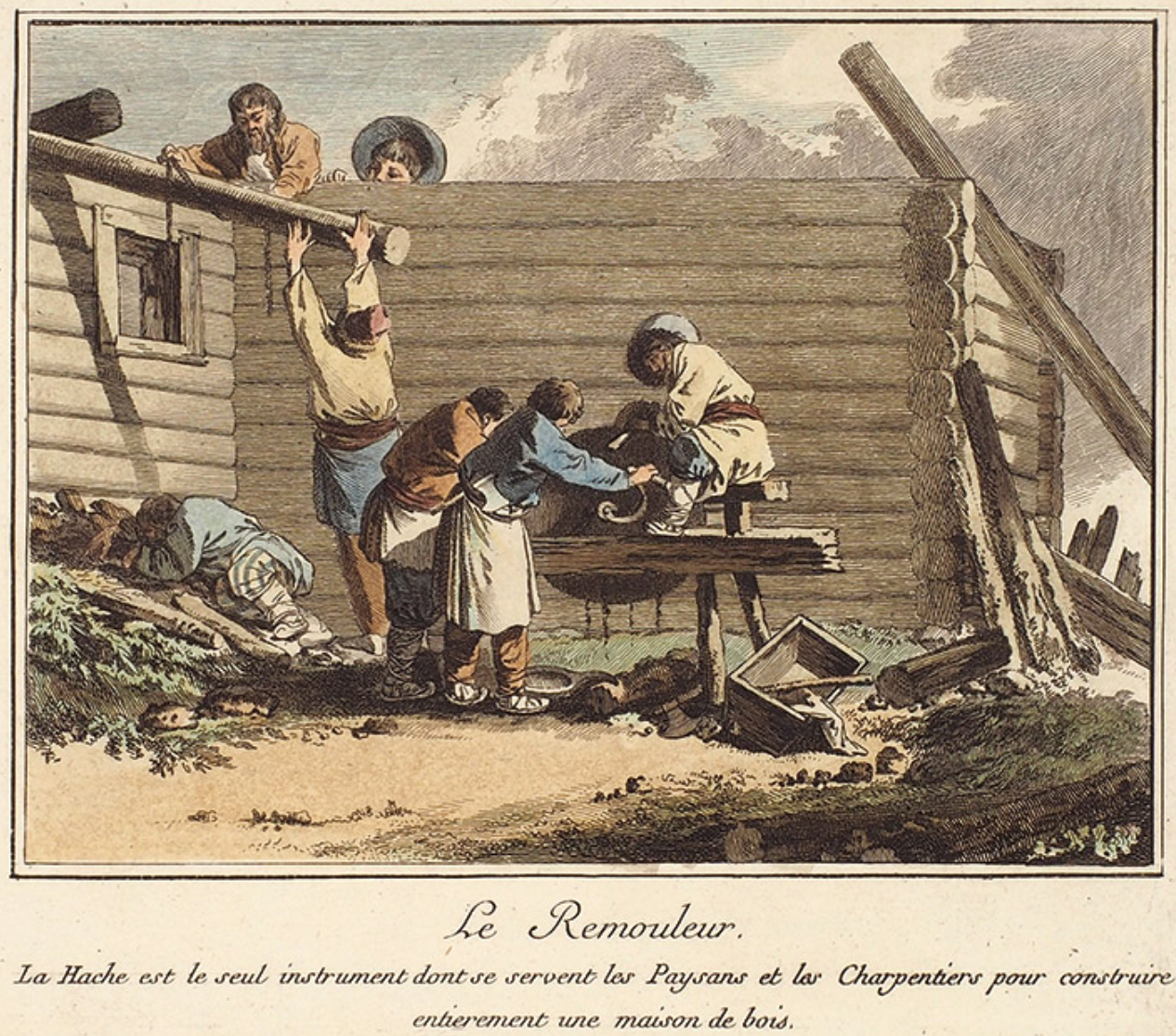
The Sharpener by J.-B. Leprince., second half of the 18th century.

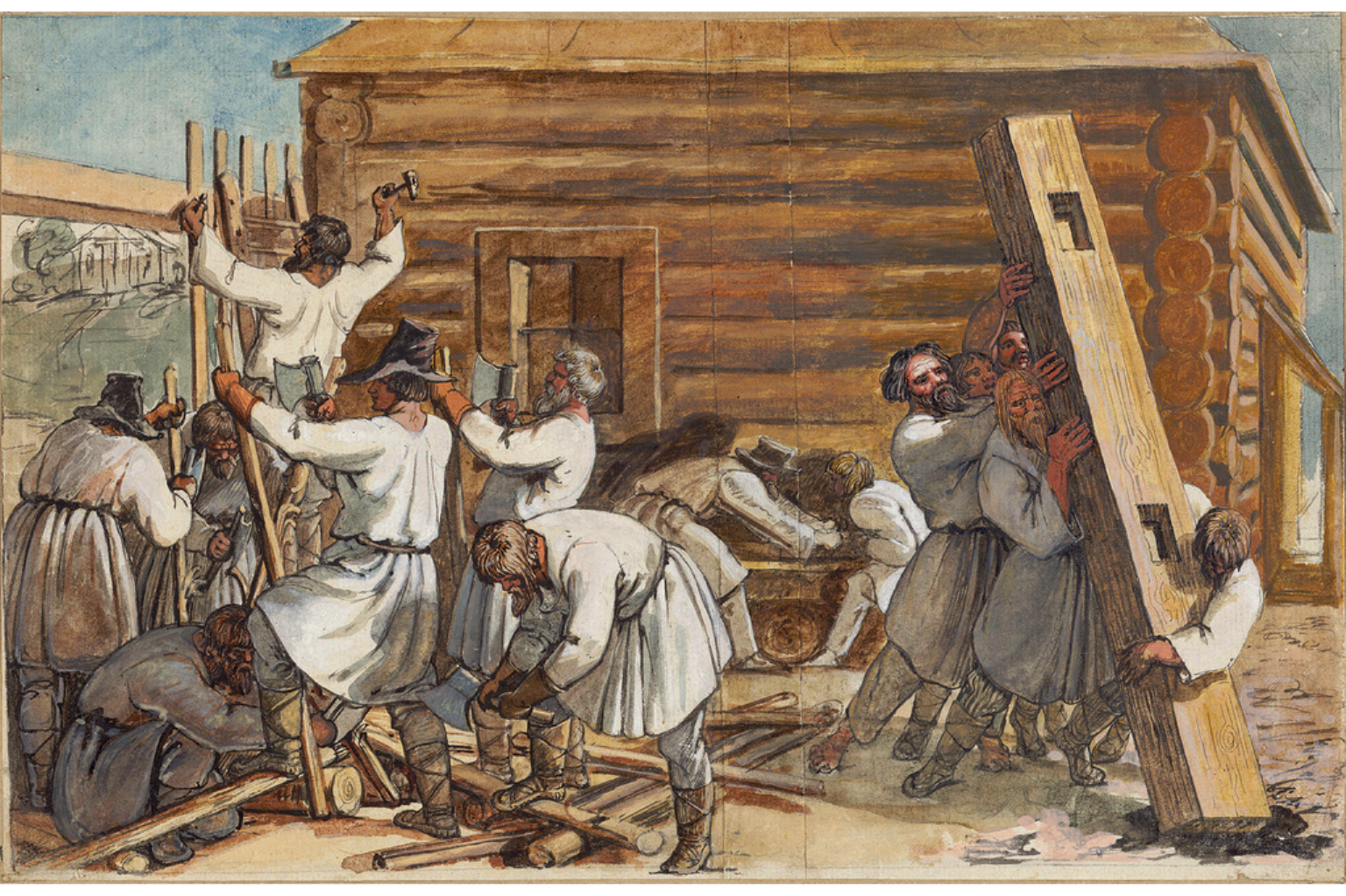
Russian peasants building a hut, by H. Oeri, 1810s

During the formation of a unified Old Russian state, carpentry became an independent branch of production. Carpenters were organized into artels, and the names of the master craftsmen who led them were sometimes carved into the buildings.

At the city bazaars for wooden goods, it was possible to purchase not only building materials but also entire buildings in disassembled form. The high level of work organization is further evidenced by the practice of constructing "ordinary churches".

Small buildings and houses were often constructed by local residents, as almost every peasant was familiar with basic carpentry skills. In contrast, urban and many rural churches were designed by professional craftsmen specializing in religious buildings. However, in the North, even into the 18th century, some designs continued to use medieval methods. The distinction between professional wooden architecture and folk architecture is often quite vague.

Wooden architecture was closely linked with pagan traditions. Peasants protected their sacred and ritual values through building rituals. Certain trees were prohibited for construction, and there were designated "lucky" and "unlucky" sites for building. Special rites accompanied the laying of walls, construction of stoves, creation of openings, installation of matitsa, and settling into a new house. Carpenters were believed to have connections with otherworldly powers. While carpenters who built houses were associated with unclean connotations, those who constructed temples were imbued with divine significance.

== Constructions typology ==
=== Residential houses and mansions ===
Wooden residential architecture was represented by different types of dwellings: from small primitive buildings with a minimum number of openings and the simplest method of heating, which resembled wilderness hut, to huge northern houses — complexes, rich choirs, and even royal palaces decorated with rich carvings. The architectural techniques used in their construction were reflected in almost all other types of buildings.

==== Typology of traditional house ====
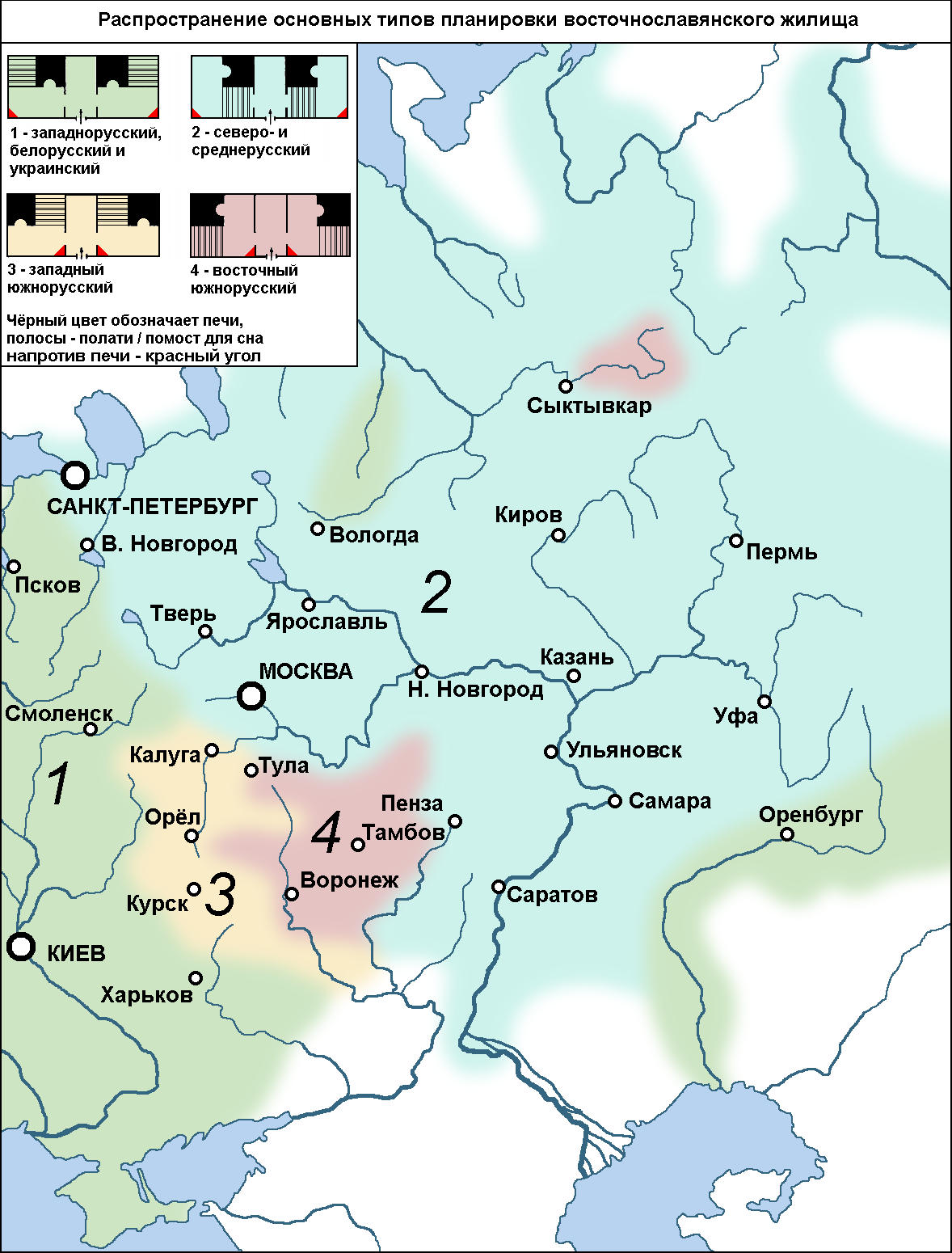
Types of housing and its distribution.

The traditional Russian house is a log cabin, sometimes with board planking and covered with a two- or four-pitched roof. These houses of Russian peasants are prevalent in the northern and middle bands of the East European Plain and are common in the northern parts of South Russian regions, such as Bryansk and Oryol, and the northern parts of Kursk, Voronezh, and Tambov regions. With Russian colonization, this style spread to the Urals, Siberia, and the Far East. Log house building was adopted by many other peoples in Russia. In the South Russian regions, brick houses have recently become predominant.

Typological features of the traditional Russian peasant mansion include: the constructive and planning solution of the residential zone, the spatial relationship between residential and economic zones, the layout of the house, the number of rooms, the vertical structure of the house, and the type of heating (including smoke removal).

According to the structural and planning solution of the living area (the heated hut, historically known as an istba or izba, (Note: Initially, the term istba referred not only to the main heated living space of a house but also to a banya (or sauna). The forms of the istba are considered to be later developments, and the explanation of the word's origin from istopit (to heat) is likely a folk etymology. The most widely accepted theories are that Old Russian istba comes from Germanic (Old High German stuba — a warm room or bath) or from Romance languages (Old French étuve — a bath).) which refers specifically to the main living part of the peasant house, not to be confused with the concept of a hut as a house in general), in the 19th century, several types of constructive and planning solutions for the living area in Russian peasant houses are distinguished:

The image of the most widespread types of huts in terms of structural-planning solution of the residential zone, formed by the 19th century.

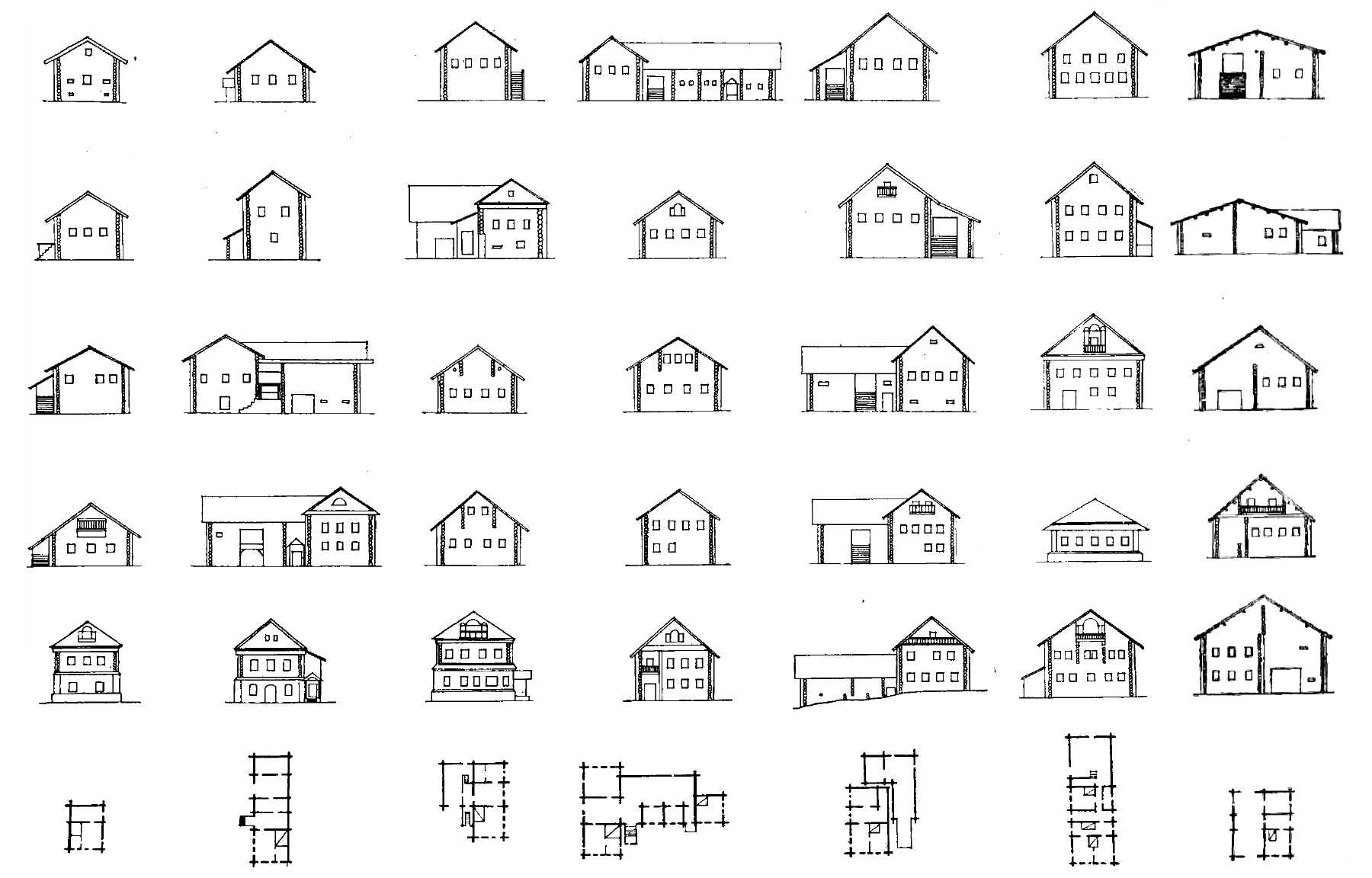
Four-walled dwellings

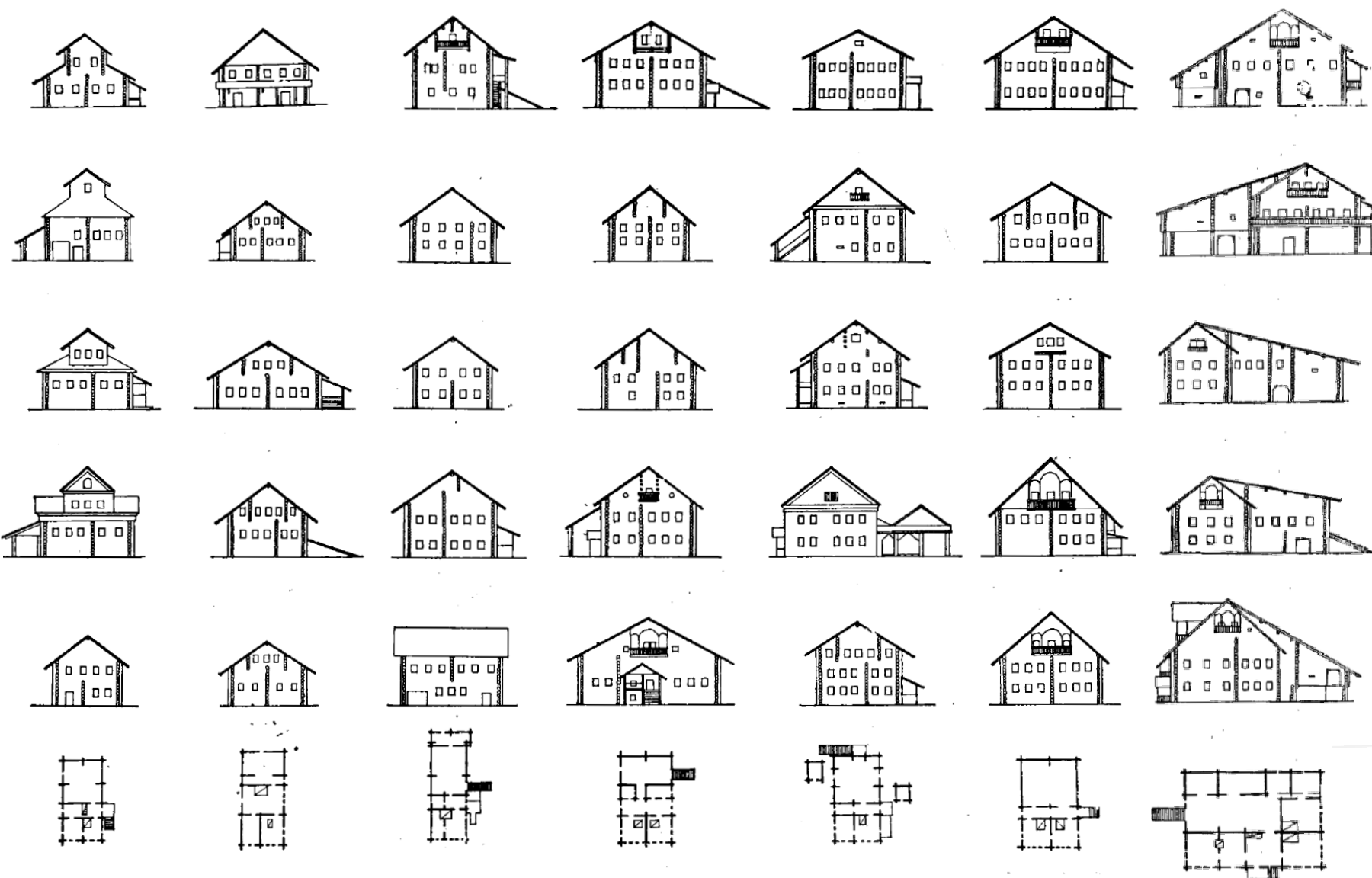
Five-walled dwellings

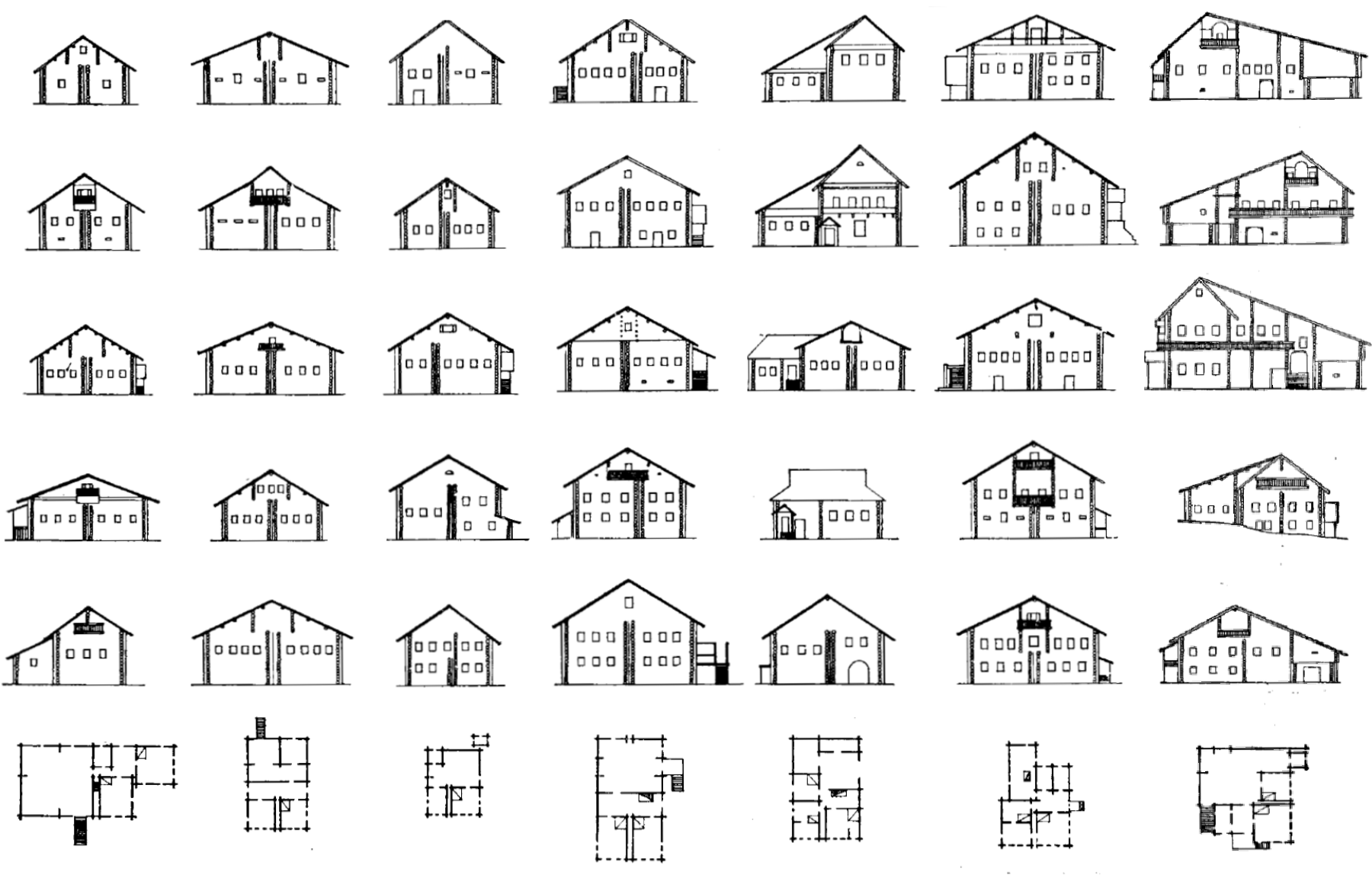
Six-walled (twin dwellings without an alley)

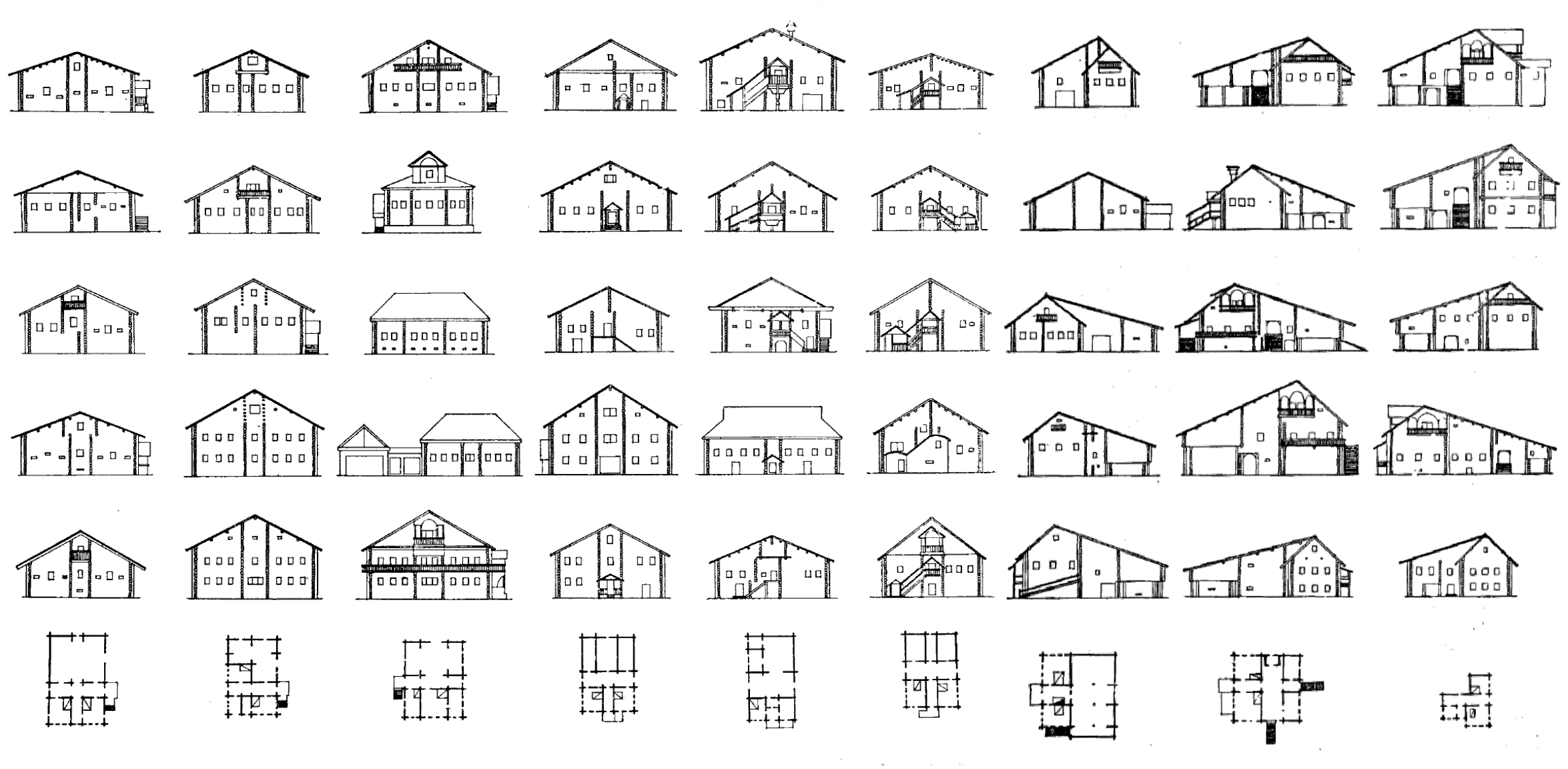
Six-walled (twin dwellings with an alley)
- Four-Walled Houses: these are houses with a single heated room surrounded by four walls. They can be single-chamber (just the izba), two-chamber (izba plus cold porch), or three-chamber (izba, porch, and an additional room). More complex versions include various utility rooms.
- Five-Walled Houses: the izba is divided by a solid wall into two living spaces. The fifth wall can be located in the middle or offset from the center.
- Six-Walled Houses: these represent a combination of two log cabins. They can be:
  - Izba with an annex (a smaller log cabin attached to the main one).
  - Twin izba (two log cabins connected or with a passage, with a small space between them).
  - Crossed connection (two five-walled houses connected by a passage) and cross-shaped (izba divided into four rooms by intersecting walls).
- Classification of Peasant Homesteads Based on the Spatial Arrangement of Living and Utility Areas:
  - Northern Russian Type: Utility rooms are combined with the living space into one building under a common roof. Includes one-row, two-row, joined, L-shaped, and T-shaped connections.
  - Central Russian Type: Includes a covered single-story courtyard with options: three-row connection and detached courtyard. Also common are room-like layouts with various subtypes (Moscow, Pskov, Volga-Kama).
  - Southern Russian Type: The courtyard is open and rectangular, with the izba positioned parallel to the street, and the courtyard enclosed in plan with a large open space in the center.

From the point of view of vertical structure, several types of houses can be distinguished: a house with one ground floor; a house with a sub-cellar, which is a partially buried floor (often used for household purposes, less frequently for residential purposes), and an upper floor; and houses with two or more floors. In palace complexes, residential log cabins could reach a height of six floors. It is also worth noting a special type of residential construction — the dugout. These were not common dwellings even in antiquity, but they were built as temporary shelters during natural disasters, wars, and the development of new lands.

According to the method of heating (smoke removal), huts are divided into black (smoke) and white. In black huts, the smoke accumulated under the ceiling, warmed the room, and exited through an open door, window, or chimney — a wooden decorated chimney on the roof. Black huts were eventually replaced by white huts, whose stoves had chimneys.

==== The development of residential structures ====
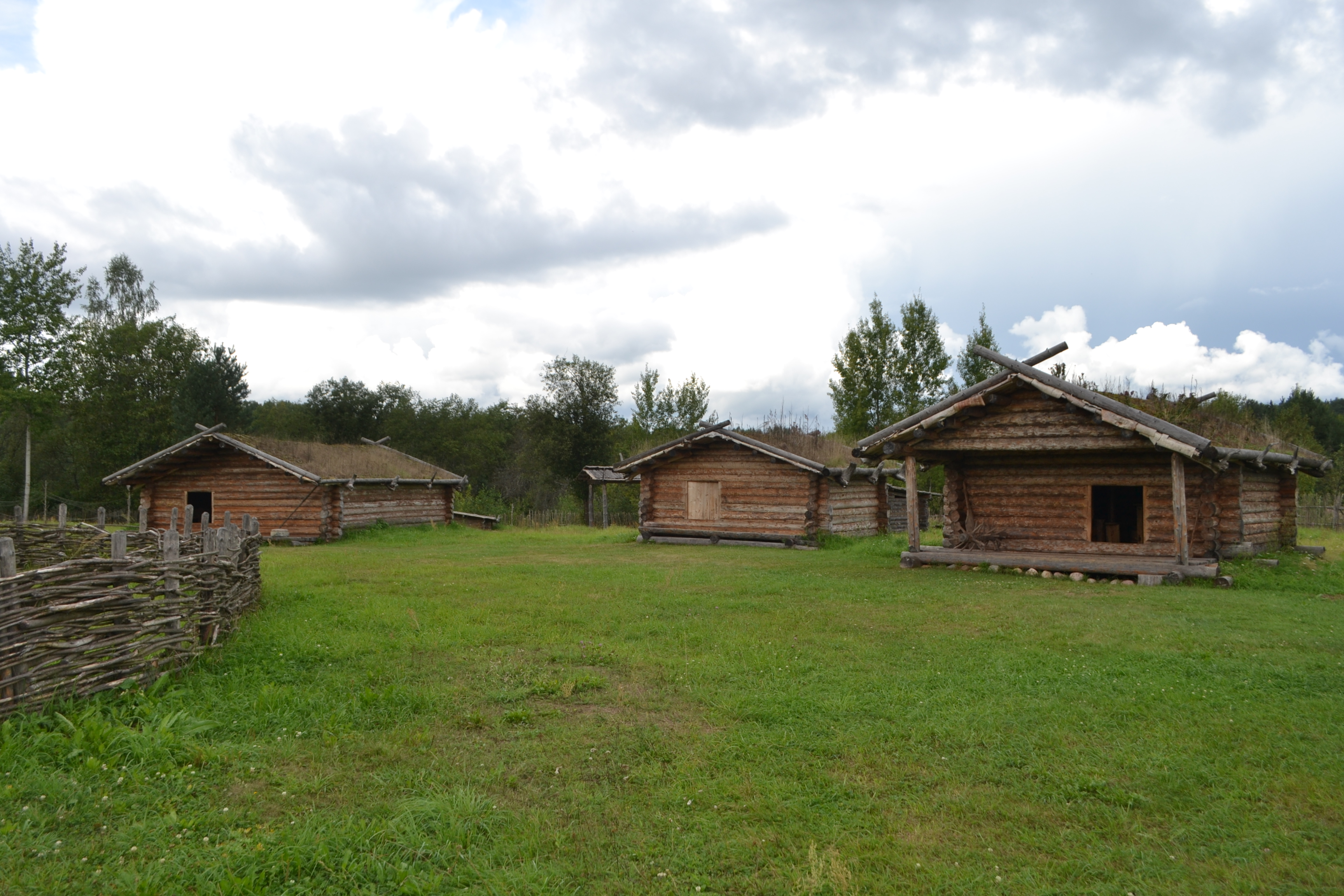
Slavic settlement of the 10th century in Lyubytino (Novgorod region). Reconstruction. Houses are single-chambered, but some of them have galleries at the entrance, which could serve as a prototype of haylofts

Ancient Russian dwellings varied by region, with sunken-floor designs prevailing in the southern regions and ground-floor log houses widespread in the north. By the 13th century, dwellings with sunken floors became prevalent even in the forest-steppe zone. Significant changes occurred in the first centuries of the Old Russian state, such as the orientation of walls to cardinal directions becoming less obligatory. M. G. Rabinovich identified four types of internal layout. The relocation of ovens to the corner near the entrance in Central Russian and northern dwellings led to an asymmetrical facade composition. By the 10th century, two-chambered houses were already present in regions like Pskov-Novgorod and Kiev, although most structures were one-chamber square huts, 4–5 meters wide.

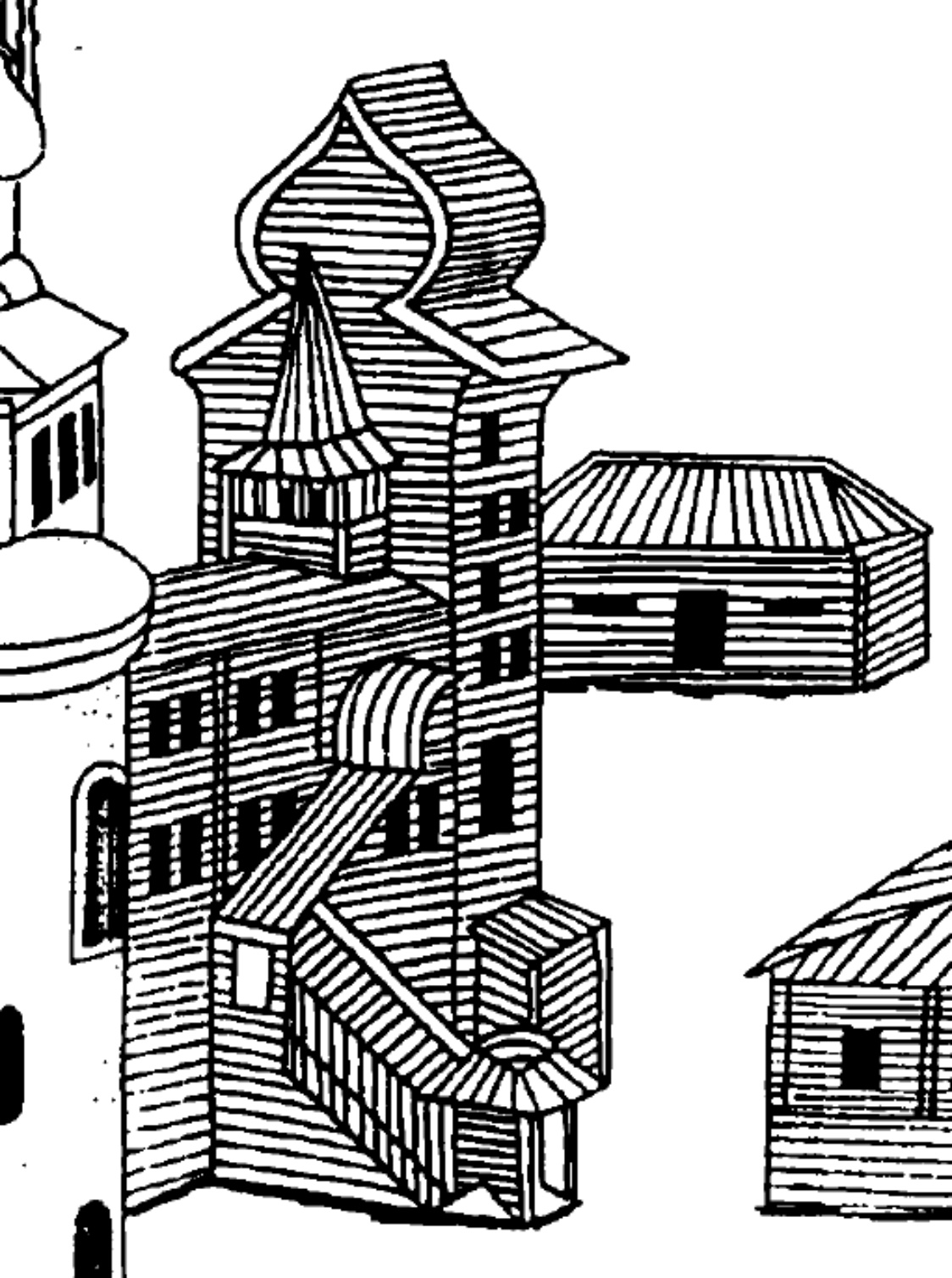
The Stroganovs' tower complex in Solvychegodsk (Arkhangelsk region) was finished with a barrel, 1565.

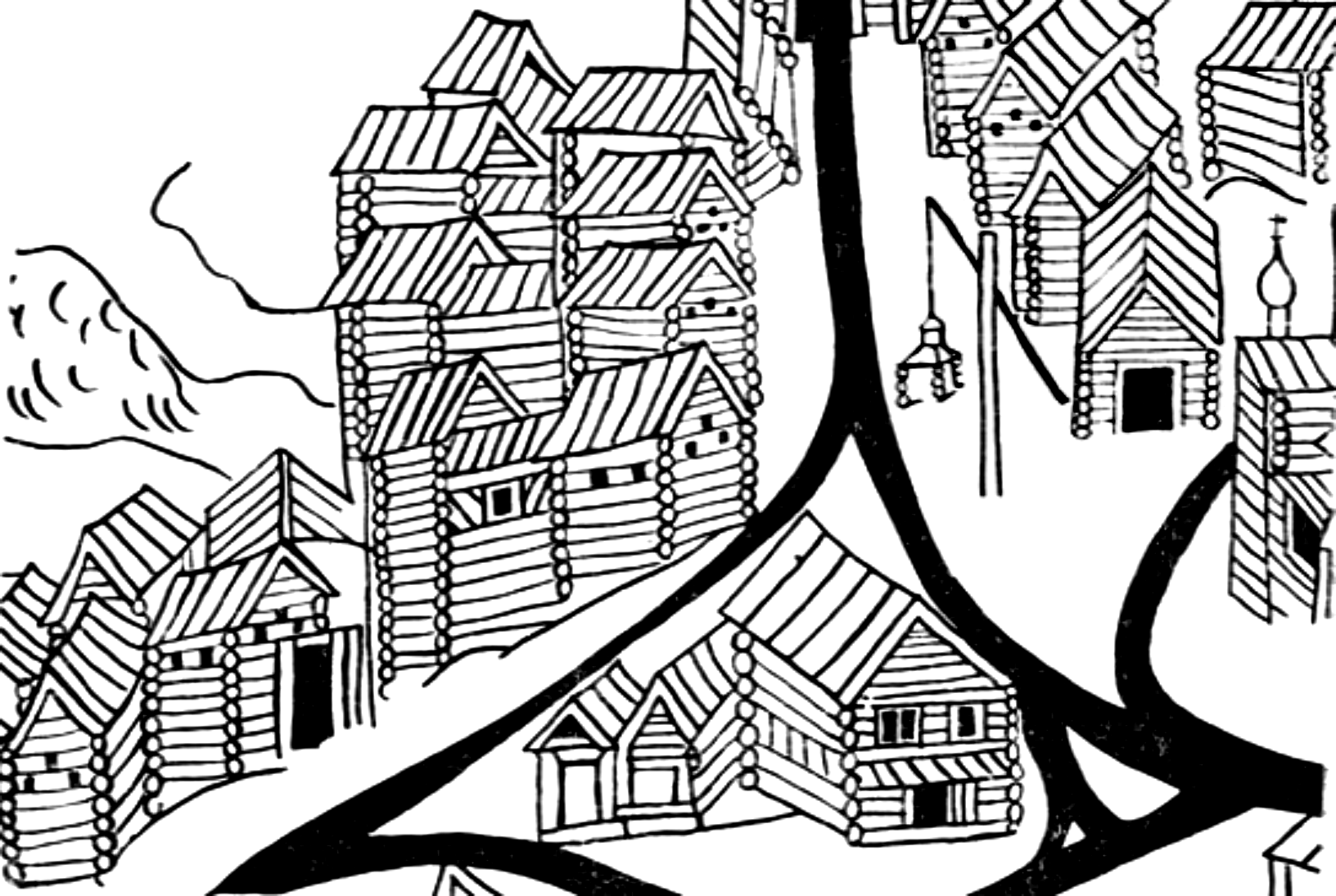
Dwelling houses on a fragment of the plan of Tikhvin settlement (Leningrad Region). 1678. On the left above — three-roomed dwellings on undercrofts

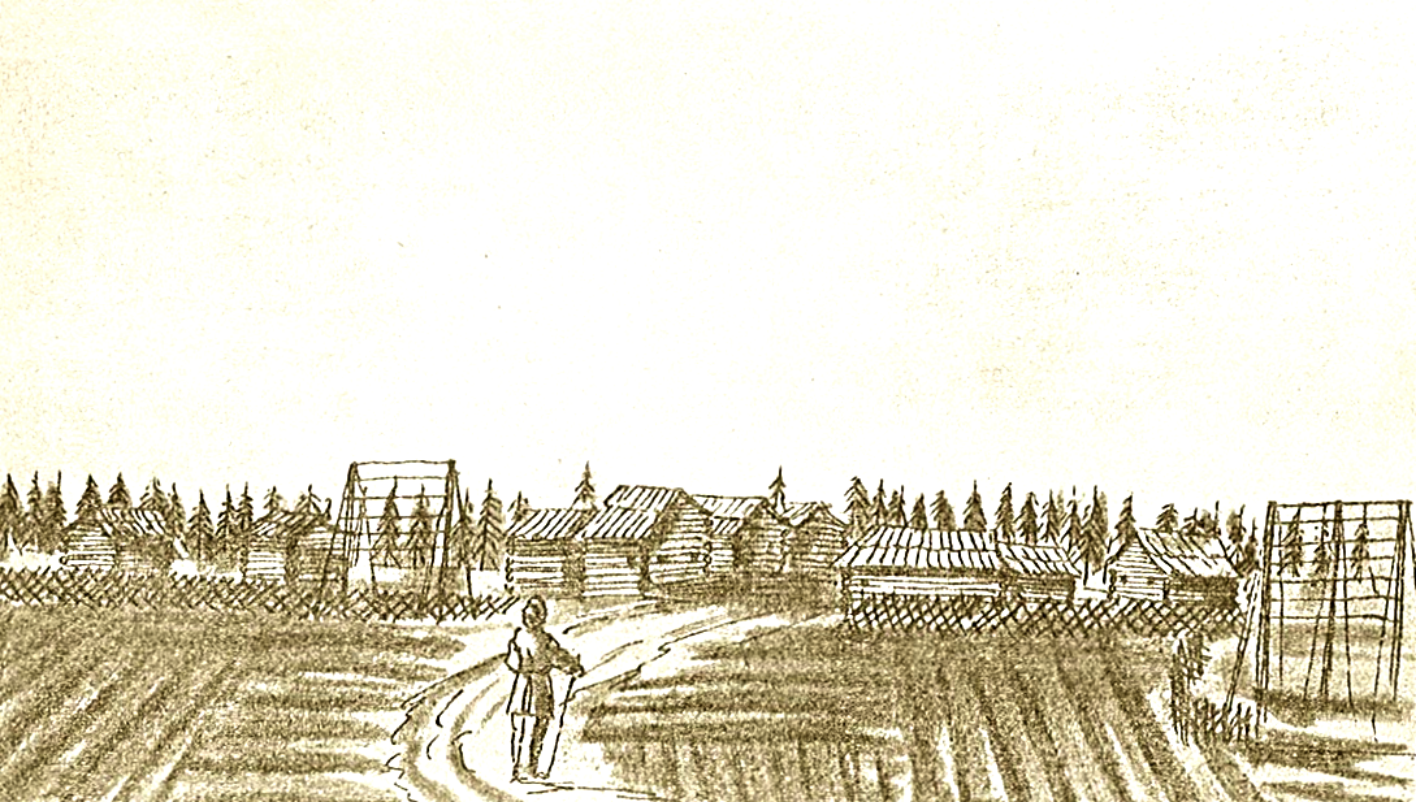
Zaitsevo village (Novgorod region). 1660s. From A. Meyerberg's album.

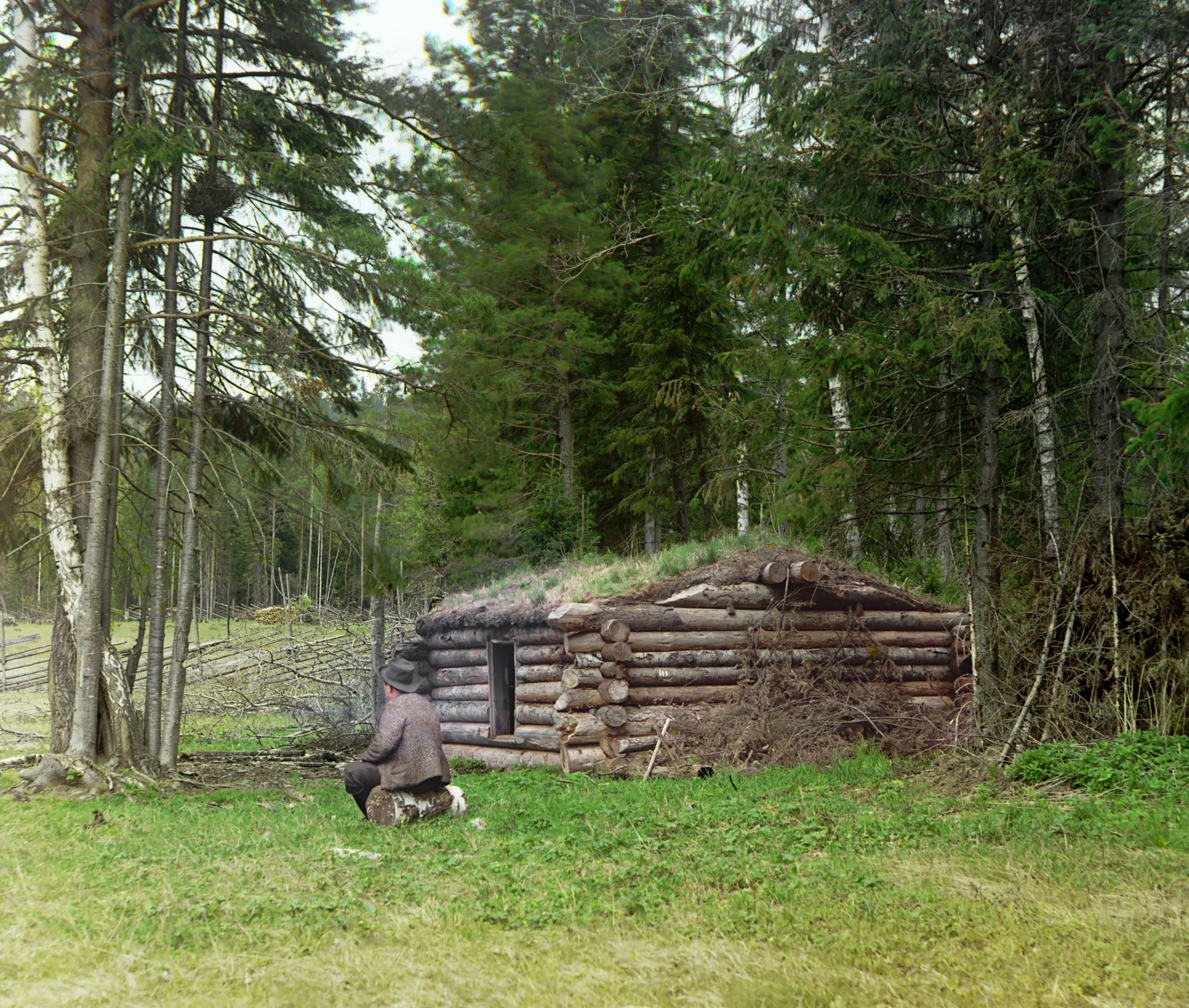
A wilderness hut: buildings that retained many features of archaic dwellings.

Log cabins were primarily constructed from pine, less often from spruce, and rarely from hardwoods. These cabins were typically built without foundations, sometimes insulated with rubble piles, and floors were generally boarded, though some were earthen. While two-storey houses are mentioned, the majority of dwellings were single-storey, with windows either hollowed out or absent. Pitched roofs covered with earth are noted by the Arab geographer Ibn Rusta in the early 10th century, who described how the cold climate led to the construction of cellars with pointed roofs covered in earth:

The cold in their country is so severe that each of them digs a kind of cellar in the ground, to which they add a wooden pointed roof, resembling that of a Christian church, and cover it with earth. In such cellars, they move with the whole family, and, having gathered some wood and stones, they light a fire and heat the stones until they are red-hot. When the stones are red-hot, they pour water over them, causing steam to spread and heat the dwelling to the point where they take off their clothes. They remain in such dwellings until spring.

In the 11th–13th centuries, construction techniques in cities like Kiev and Novgorod evolved. In Kiev, frame-pillar dwellings and log houses with deepened floors were common, with a significant number of two-chamber log houses built during this period. The transition to houses on high podklets and full-fledged two-storey houses began in Veliky Novgorod during the 12th–13th centuries. Manor complexes like the one built in the 1150s, possibly belonging to icon artist Olisey Grechin, exemplify this evolution.

During the 16th–17th centuries, Russian architecture experienced intensive construction. Englishman J. Fletcher noted that wooden houses, typically constructed from dry pine, were more comfortable than stone or brick ones due to their warmth:

It seems that the Russians are much more comfortable with wood construction than with stone or brick because the latter are more humid and cold than wooden houses made of dry pine wood, which provides more heat. Providence has rewarded them with forests in such abundance that it is possible to build a decent house for 20-30 rubles or a little more even where there is little forest. However, wooden buildings are uncomfortable, especially because they can burn easily...

The 16th–17th centuries also saw the proliferation of complex multi-chambered mansions on undercrofts, connected by staircases and passages. By this time, the characteristic three-window facade composition of Russian huts had developed. Roofs were double-pitched, with variations depending on the region. By the 18th century, tower complexes, which had been a feature of rich houses in the 16th–17th centuries, began to disappear. The palace of Alexei Mikhailovich in Kolomenskoye, consisting of 7 choirs, is a prime example of the complex architecture of this period, featuring ornamentation similar to that found in stone architecture.

In the 18th and 19th centuries, there was a significant development of house building and estate planning. The facades of houses began to face the red line of the street, and closed courtyards - fortresses disappeared. At that time, the most popular houses were izba-linked and five-walled houses, which became multi-roomed due to partitions. From the 2nd half of the 19th century the peasants changed from three-chambered and four-walled houses to five- and six-walled ones. Single-row houses became common, and the vertical structure of houses varied from pozemnye huts to houses with undercrofts and two-story structures. Architecture in cities developed under the influence of common European styles such as Baroque, Classicism and Empire, which led to the stylization of wooden houses. Peasant cottages also underwent radical changes under the influence of the city and landed estates, especially in the north and the Volga region. In the late 19th century, eclecticism reached its peak, which, according to some experts, led to the collapse of the Old Russian wooden architecture culture, despite the fact that more than half of the towns consisted of 95% wooden houses.

In the mid-19th century, along with the discussions about the national style, professional architects began to show interest in wooden architecture. Its motifs were used by V. A. Hartman, I. P. Ropet and F. O. Shechtel, especially in Russian pavilions at international exhibitions, which impressed the foreign public. The decorativism of facades, characteristic of the followers of the Russian style of the late 19th and early 20th centuries, reached its peak in the works of I. P. Ropet. Ropet's style received mixed reviews, as the solutions that were successful for exhibitions and country buildings were not always suitable for urban development. A. V. Opolovnikov criticized the stylization in folk architecture for mechanical copying of forms, rather than for the use of aesthetic content.

In the 1920s and 1930s, rural housing consisted mainly of wooden cabins with improved planning. Such houses were also built in cities, including wooden apartment buildings. Some Soviet architects returned to pre-revolutionary traditions in their dacha designs, but over time it became apparent that wooden construction did not fit the new Soviet realities. By the middle of the 20th century, the tradition of wooden architecture was a thing of the past, giving way to frame, brick, block, and panel construction.

Modern wooden residential architecture in Russia is represented mainly by individual houses. Architects such as T. Kuzembaev, N. V. Belousov, and V. G. Kuzmin work in this direction. Some of them stylize their projects under the Russian style, and others, like N. V. Belousov, combine modern architecture with tradition.

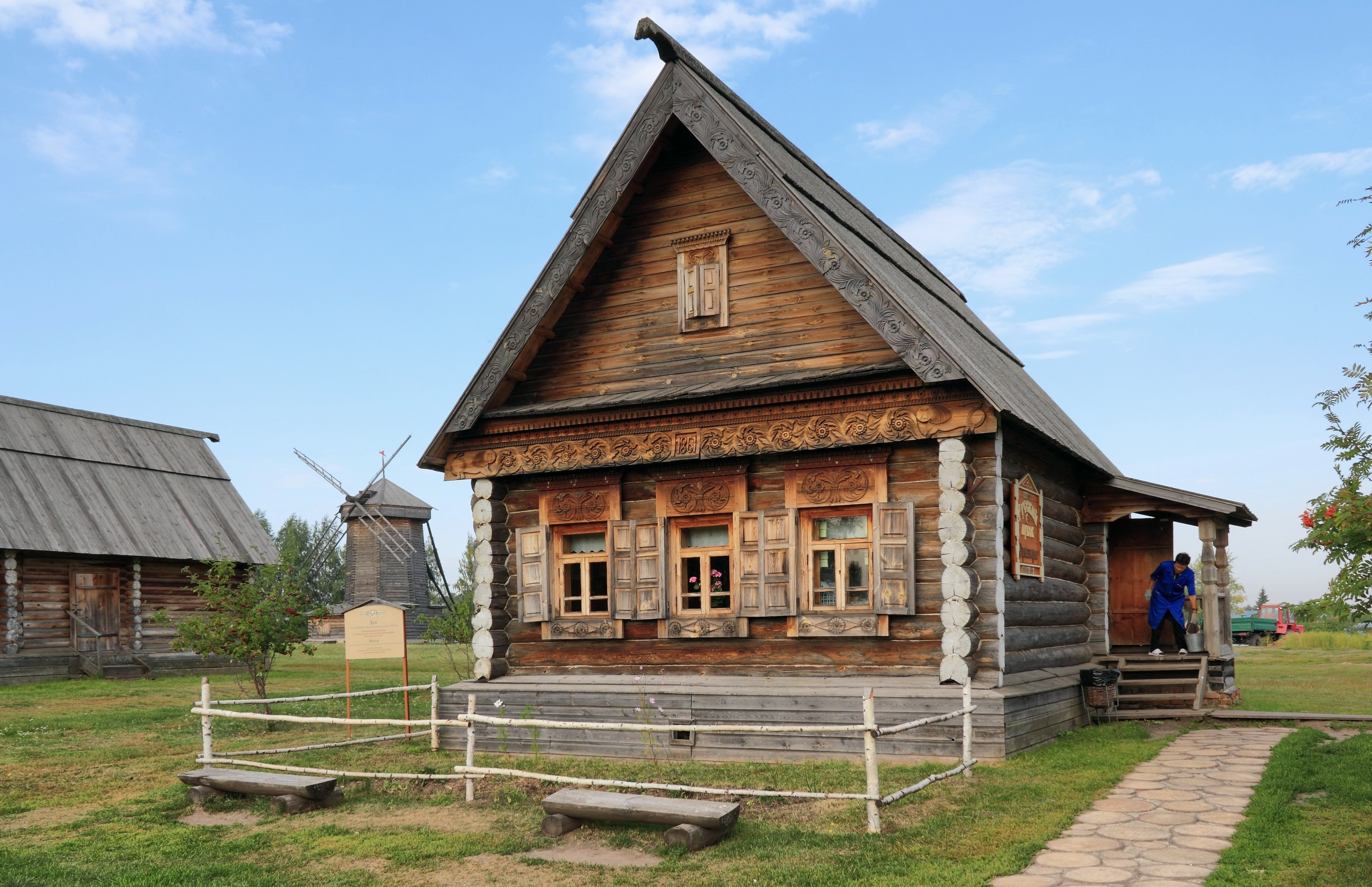
The Sergin House from Munozero (Karelia). An example of a northern house-complex of the 2nd half of the 19th century.

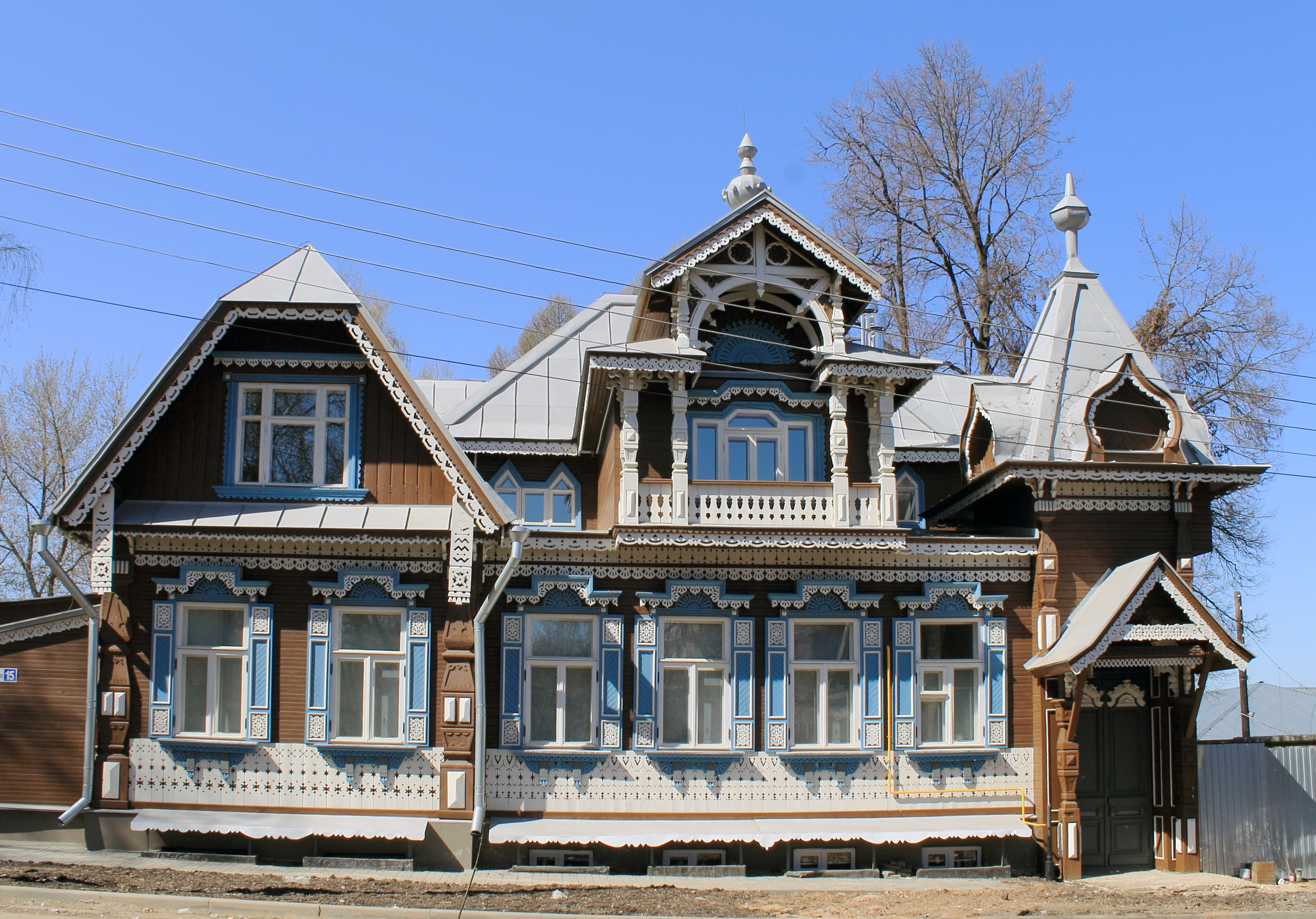
V. I. Smirnov's house in Nizhny Novgorod. 1890s. An example of the Russian style.

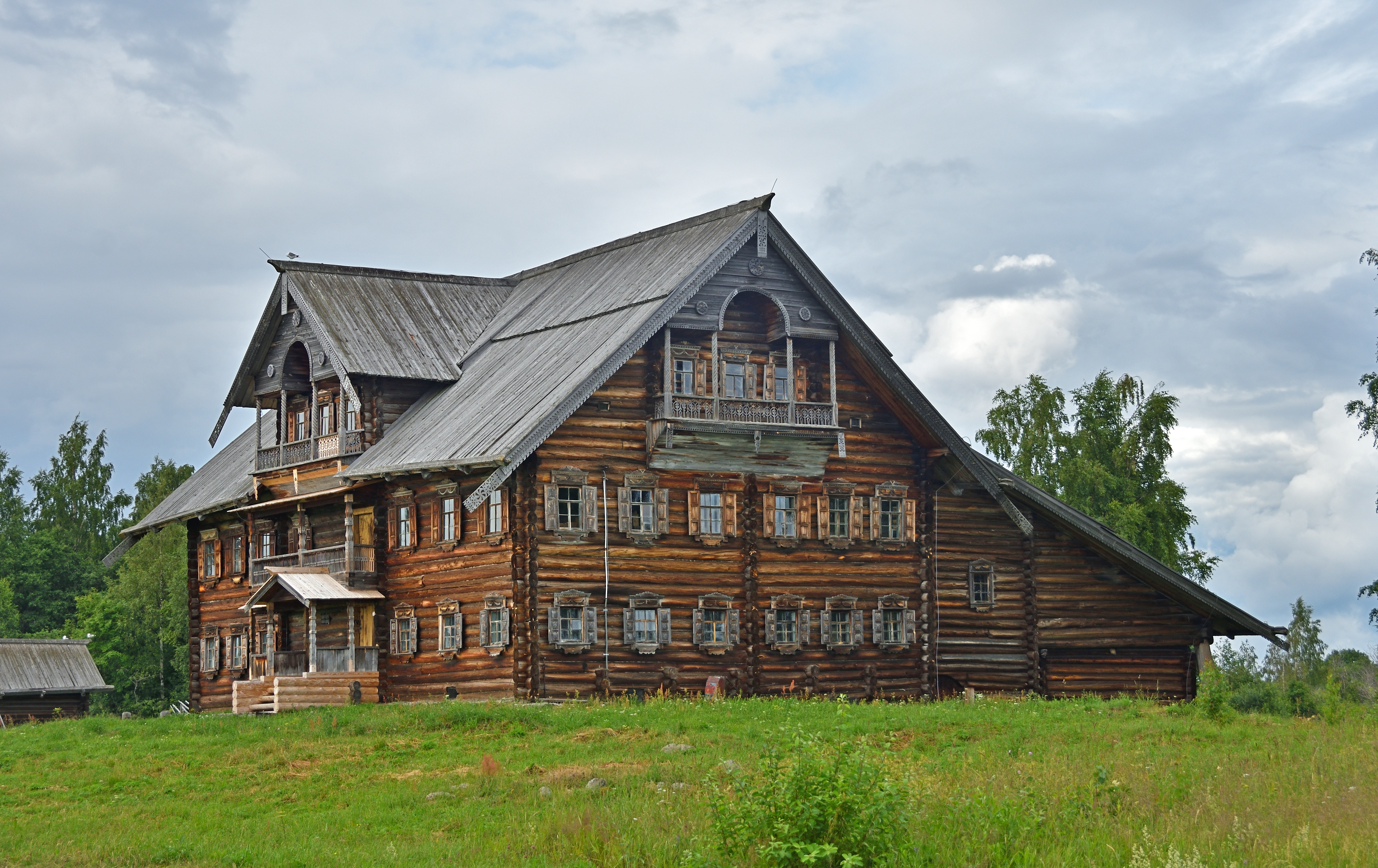
The Sergin house from Munozero (Karelia). An example of a northern house-complex of the 2nd half of the 19th century.

=== Outbuildings and engineering constructions ===
Agricultural buildings included threshing barns and sheep drying houses (ovens and rigs). These massive log structures did not strive for architectural expression. Sheaves were sometimes dried on open hangers. To store grain and flour, barns were built, characterized by a variety of architectural solutions: from small log cabins with a single-pitched roof to large two-story barns with a double-pitched roof. Some barns were built on poles to protect them from rodents. Later barns had sheds and frames. Hunting barns were small barns on high posts.

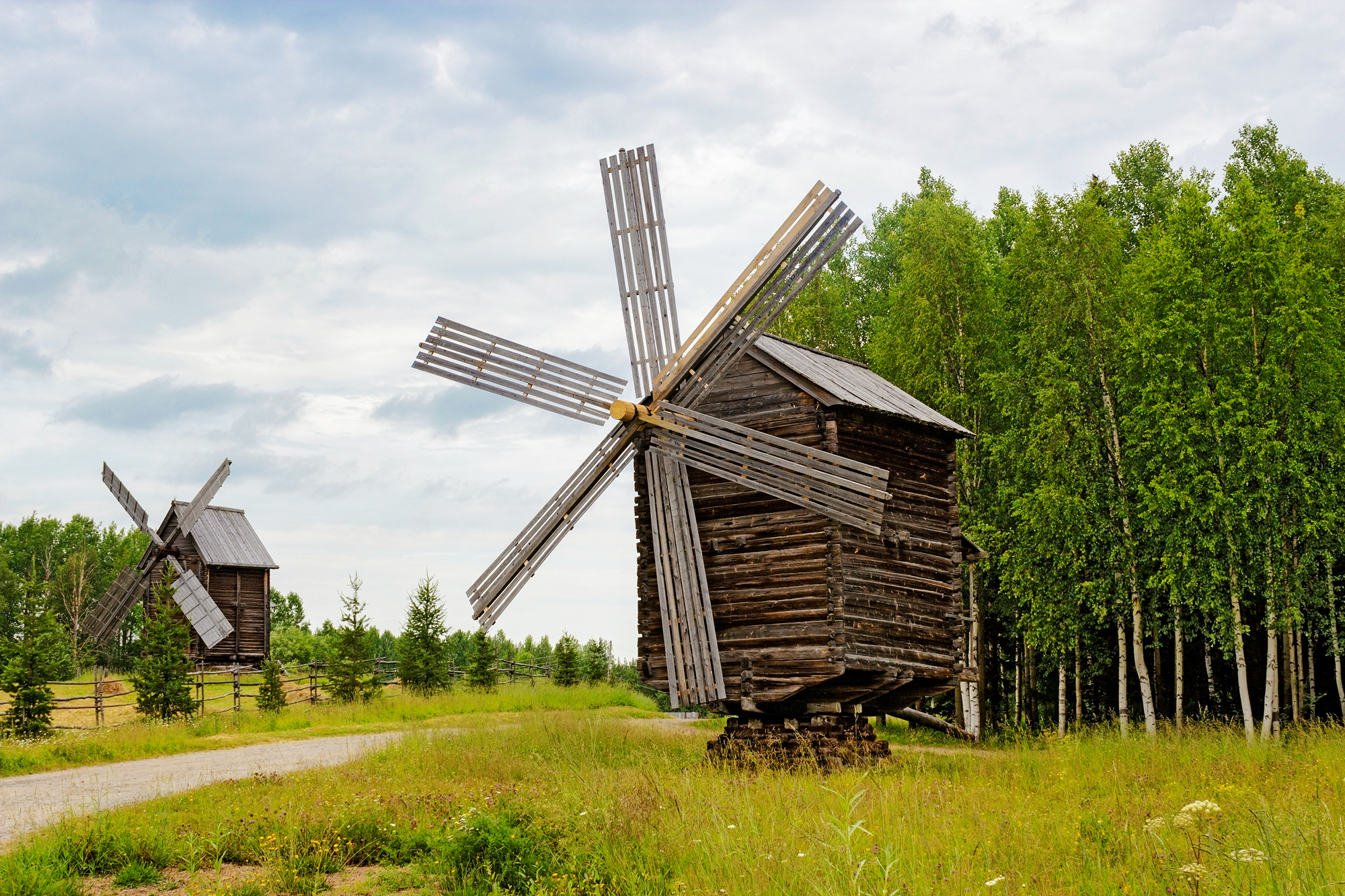
Stolbovki mills on cages from Bolshaya Shalga (Arkhangelsk region).

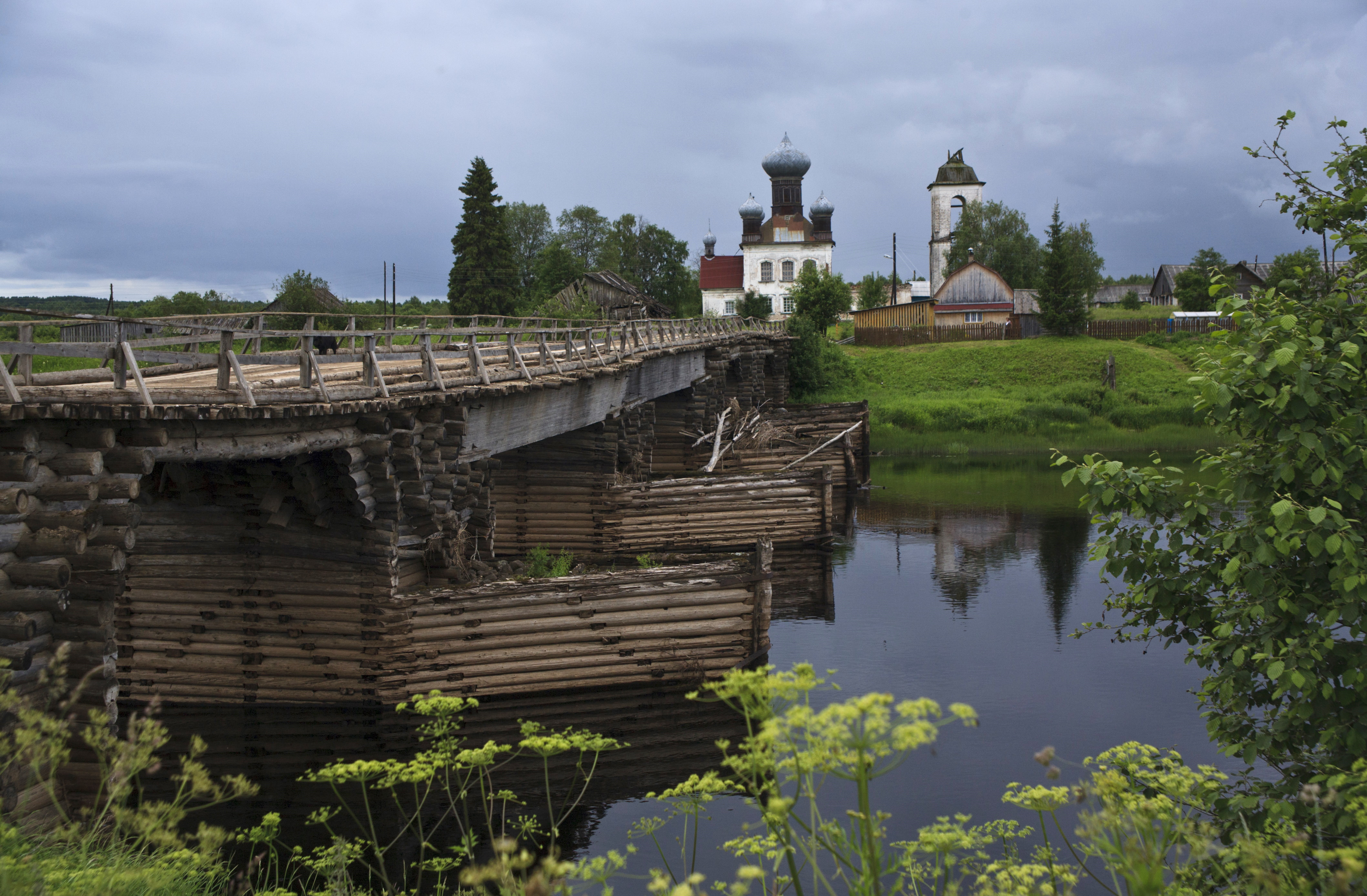
Bridge over Kenu (Arkhangelsk region).

Water mills did not differ much in appearance from ovens and goumens, while windmills, which appeared in the 15th century in the Moscow region, were more substantial. Stolbovka mills are common in the north, and shatrovki in the central zone and the Volga region.

Bathhouses, which often had one room and a single or double-pitched roof, later received an anteroom and were placed far from dwellings. In the southern and Siberian regions, stables, haylofts, and barns were also built.

Urban facilities included stables, cookhouses, cellars, icehouses, and workshops.

Professional carpenters and bridge builders existed in ancient Russia. The 10th-century Great Bridge at Veliky Novgorod had a complex design with pentagonal stone-built log cabins as supports. The span between them was more than 17 meters. Such bridges were called row bridges. The most famous is the bridge over the Kena river in the Arkhangelsk region. Cantilever bridges were used on narrow rivers.

The walls of the wells were fixed with a log or a hollowed-out tree trunk. The mechanisms for lifting the tubs were usually a "crane" or a drum with a handle on which a rope was wound. A double-pitched roof was often built over wells with drums.

=== Fortress constructions ===
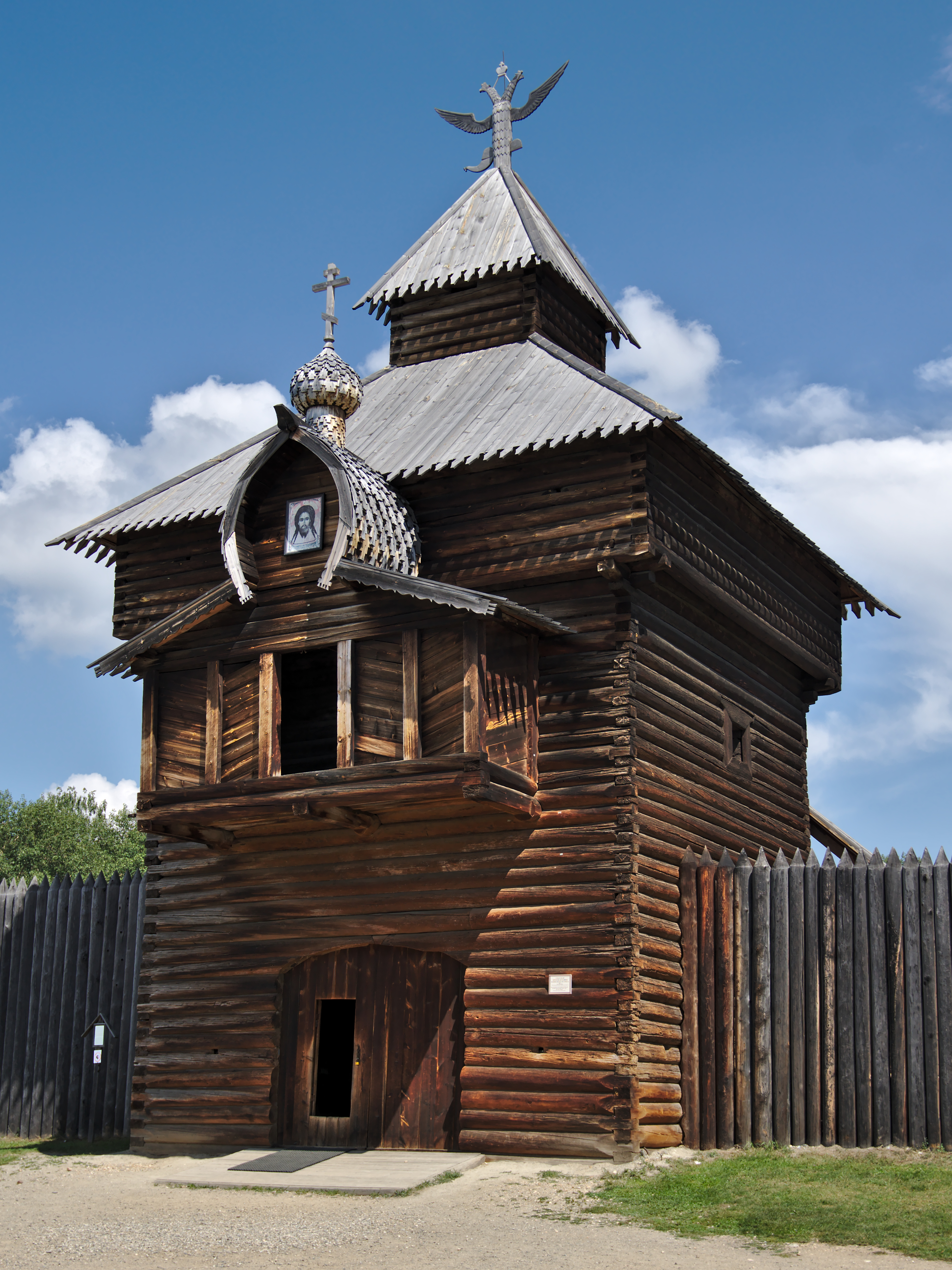
Ilimsk Tower (Irkutsk region). 1667. The uniqueness of the tower is in the hinged chapel above the entrance.

The oldest defensive structures in Russia included a palisade, barbed or woven fences, ramparts and ditches. Palisades were often supplemented with log structures for flooring. Large cities were protected by wooden fortresses consisting of log cells (gorodni) or double-row solid walls with cross sections (taras). Wall cells were filled with earth, stones or used as rooms. Log structures were also placed inside earthen ramparts on which walls were built. These walls had a roofed passage with a log bunker and loopholes. Probably as early as in the 12th century, overhanging log projections (obrams) were used, which became widespread in Russian defensive architecture. Steps with loopholes were intended for fighting. In 1237, after the invasion of the Mongol army, fortresses with higher and thicker walls, several rows of walls and several towers (vezhi, lancets, fires, pillars) of four, six or octagonal shape began to be built. Towers were practically absent in Russian fortresses before that. The height of the walls was usually 5.3-6.4 meters; width: 3.2-4.3 meters. Passing towers were of great height and served as compositional centers of fortresses. Remains of defensive architecture have been preserved in Siberia.

=== Churches ===
The desire to diversify the silhouette of settlements was realized in the construction of tall religious buildings. In churches, utilitarian requirements receded into the background, and they became the most expressive buildings, achieving a great variety of forms and images, while preserving the canonical three-part structure of the Orthodox temple: located on the axis from west to east vestibule (porch, refectory, porch) — the main (central) volume of the temple with a room for worshippers (naos, kafolikon) — altar. The naos dominates other volumes in height, sometimes it is supplemented by aisles. The aisles are pentahedral (later) and quadrangular (ancient) in plan, covered with five- and two-pitch roofs and barrels. There are several examples where the naos and the altar were placed in a single log cabin, divided externally by covering different heights.

==== Church typology ====
An established classification of wooden temples is contained in the work of I. E. Grabar and F. F. Gornostaev. In it the temples are divided into 5 types according to the most expressive feature: cage, hipped, stepped, cubic and multi-domed. M. V. Krasovsky separately distinguished five-domed and domed churches. The principles of this classification have become generally accepted, they are used in almost all works on Russian wooden architecture. An alternative, more complex system of classification of temples and chapels was developed by V. P. Orfinsky and I. E. Grishina.

The main volume of the cell temples is rectangular in plan. They are close to the izba in their architectural and structural design, although there are also tall tower-like buildings. The simplest plan consists of a porch, a naos, and an altar. But more often it also has a narthex, a refectory, sometimes a gallery and aisles. Sometimes it is stated that the cage type of church has a two-pitch roof (including wedge, stepped, with politzes, beaded roof) although churches with four-pitch and eight-pitch endings are also attributed to the cage type. Tent belfries were built over the narthexes of some churches.

Variety of cell temples

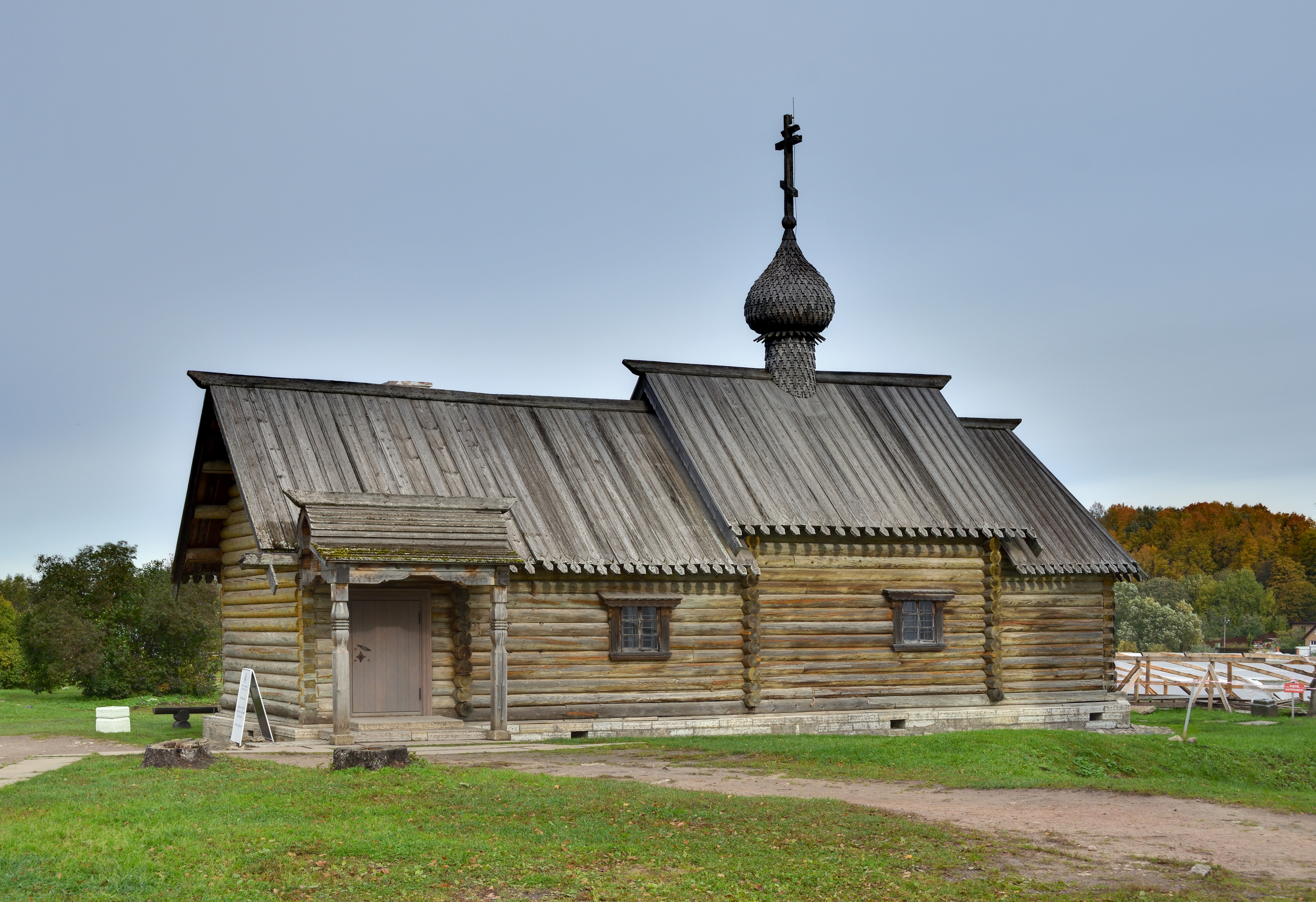
Church of Demetrius of Solunsk with simple two-pitched roofs. Staraya Ladoga (Leningrad Region).

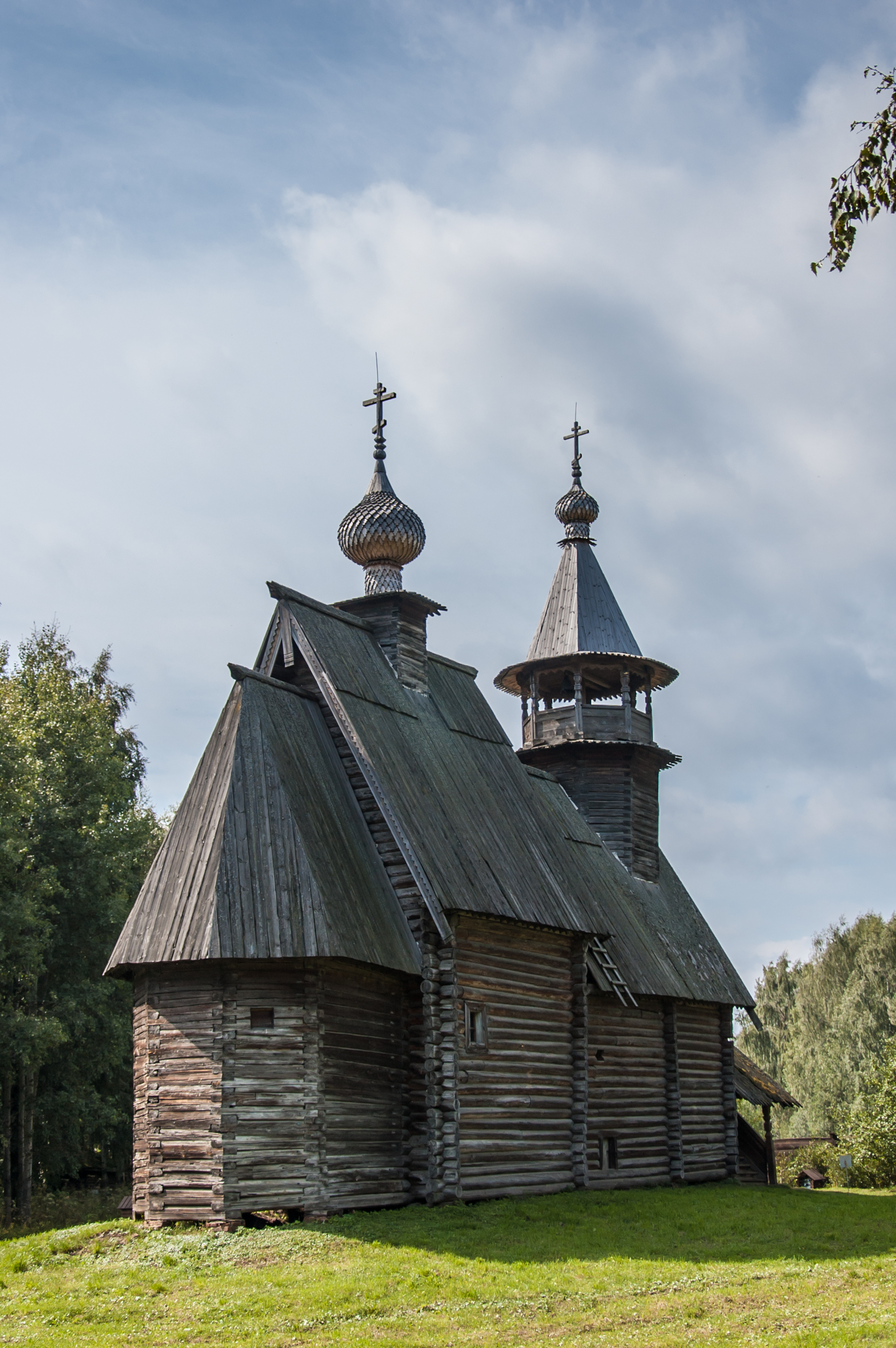
The Church of the Savior in Fominskoye village with wedge roofs and a hipped belfry. Museum in Kostroma.

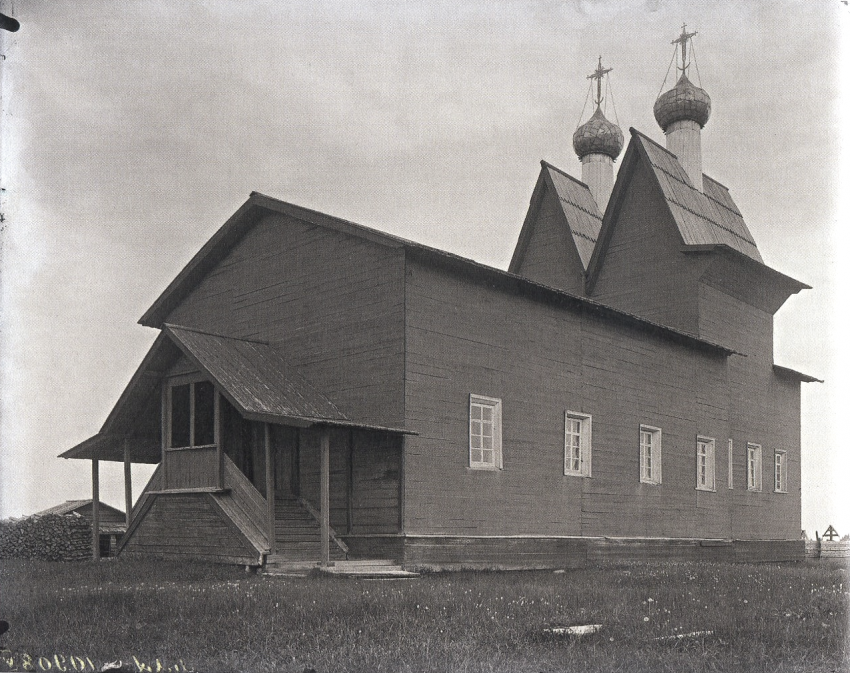
Vvedenskaya church with two parallel roofs over the naos with politzas. Osinovo (Arkhangelsk region).

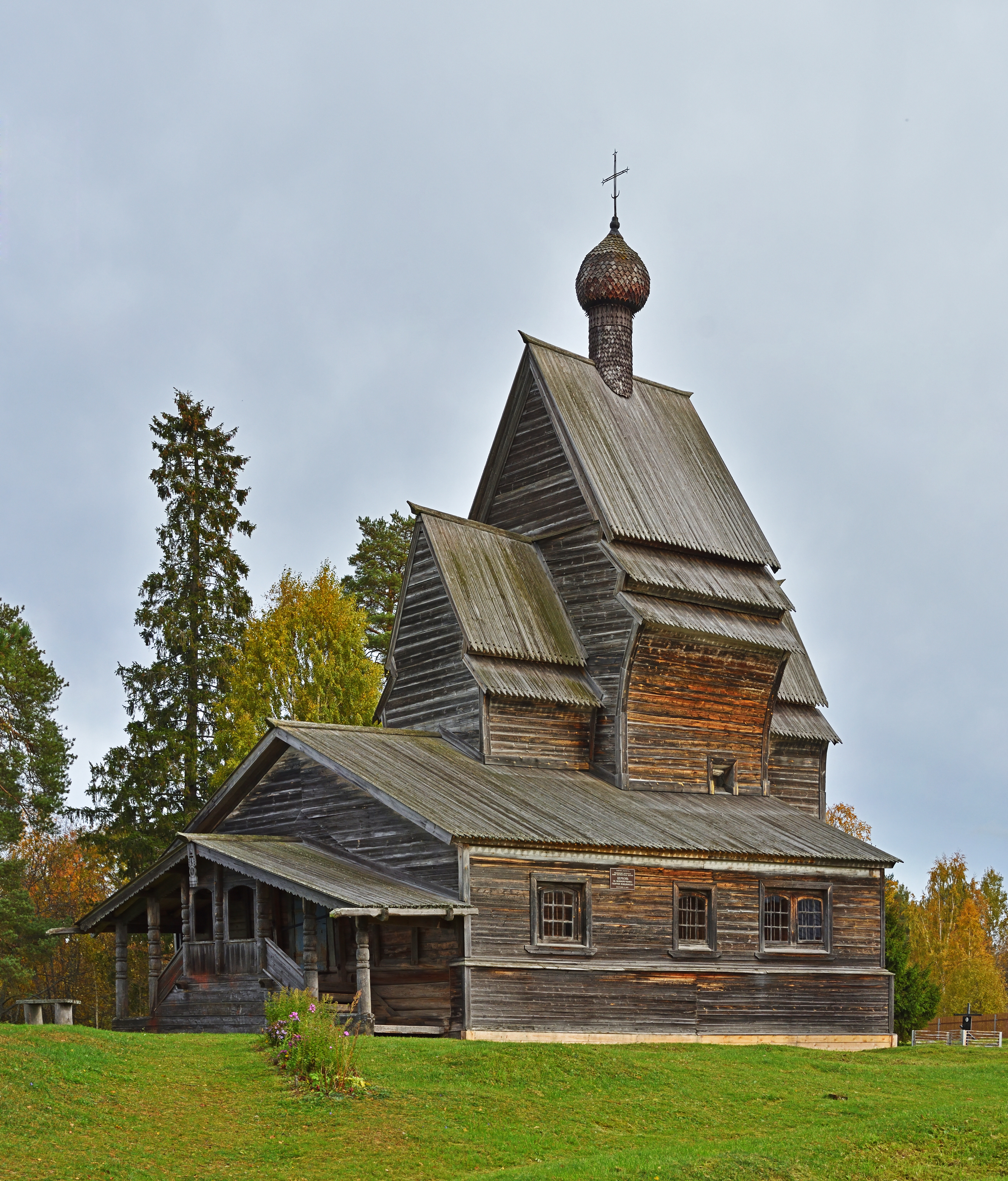
Church of St. George the Victorious with stepped roofs. Yuksovichi (Rodionovo) (Leningrad region).

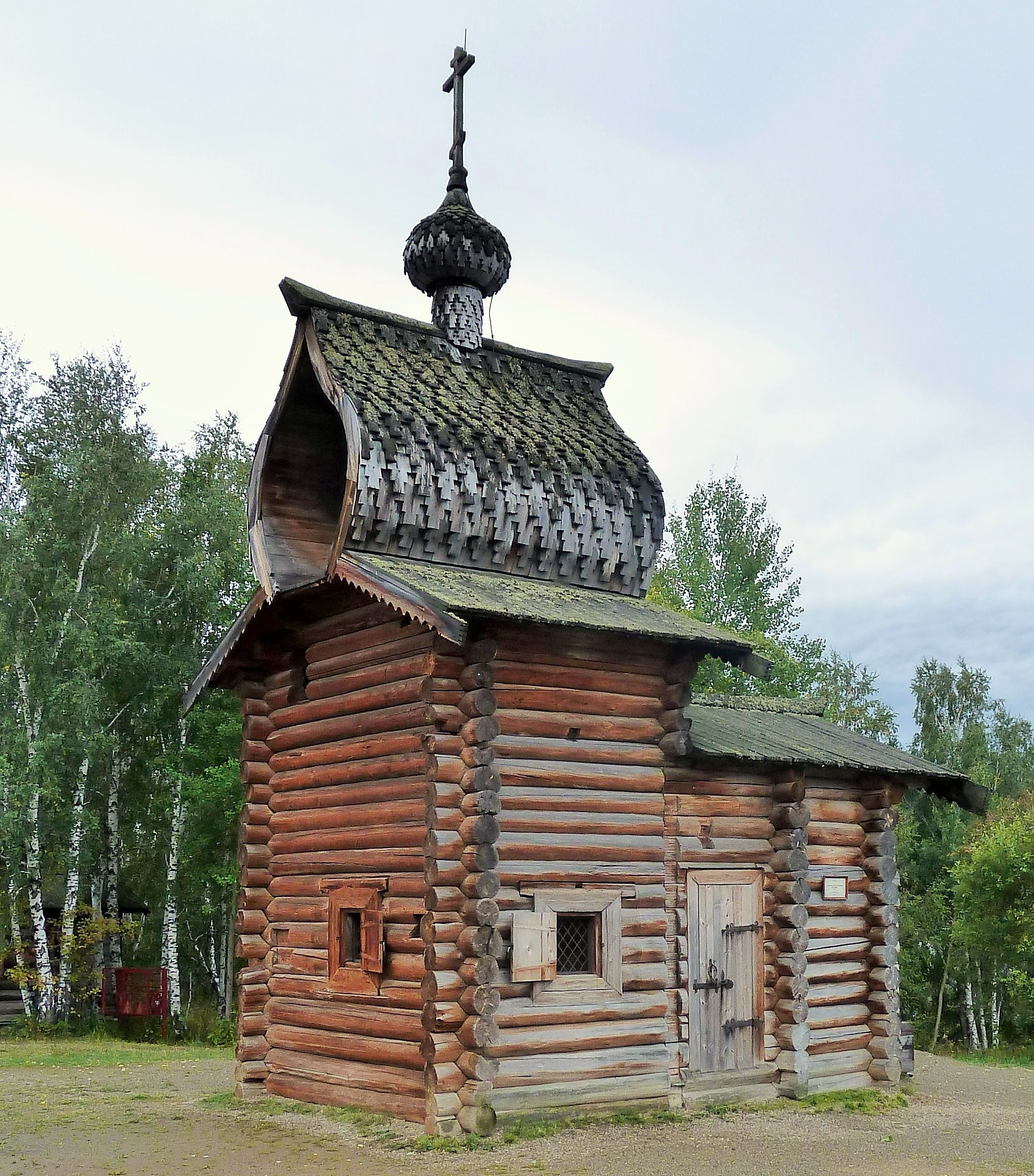
Kazan church with a beamed roof. Taltsy (Irkutsk region).

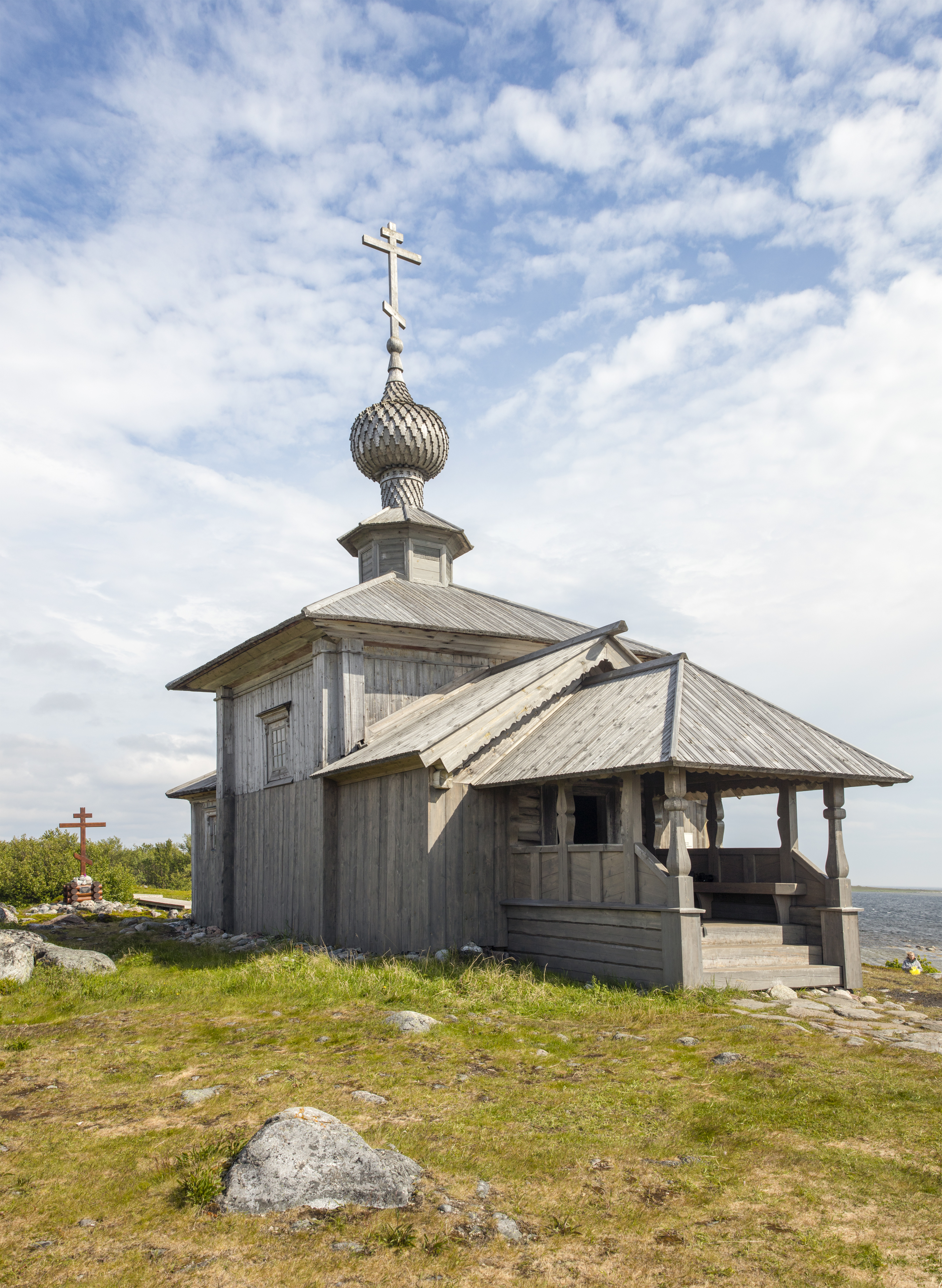
Church of St. Andrew the First-Called with a four-pitched roof. Solovki (Arkhangelsk region).

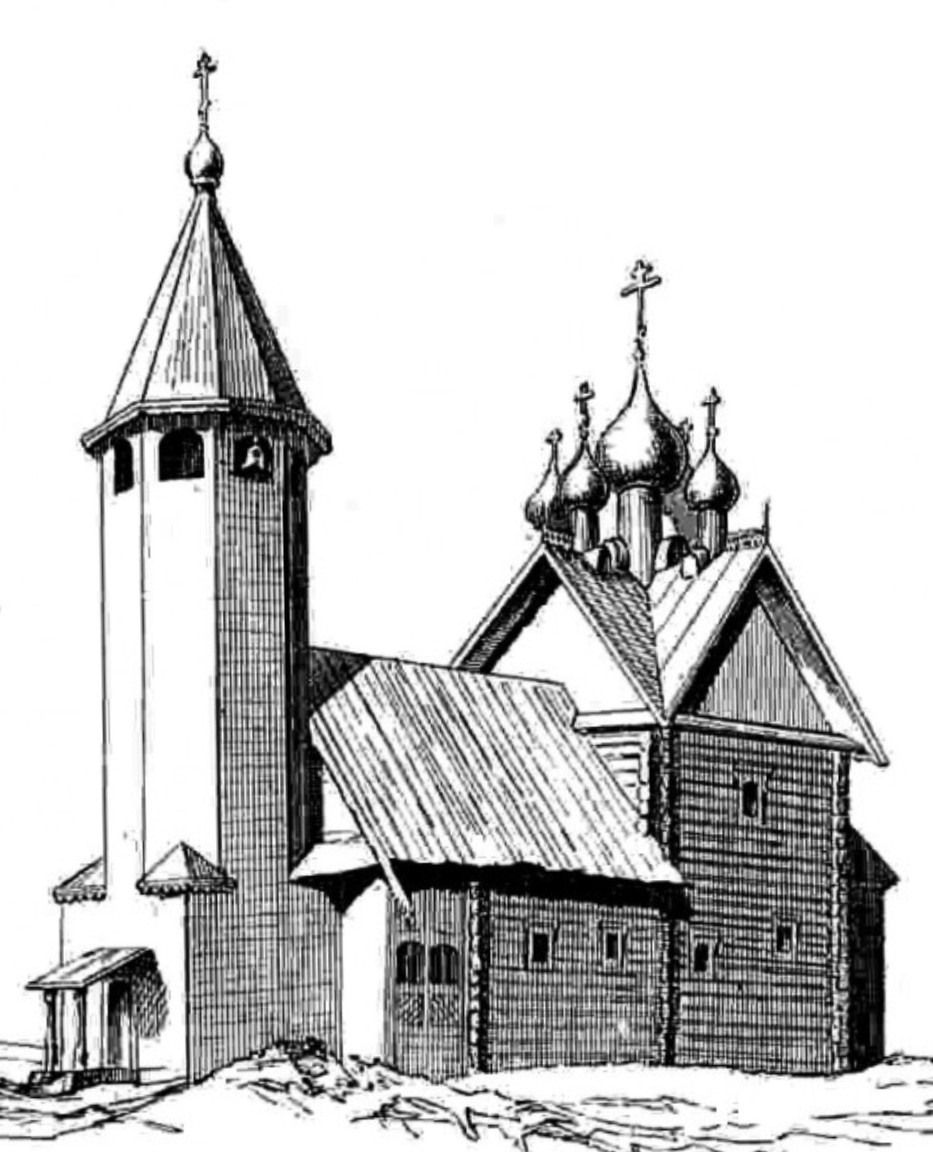
Resurrection church with an eight-pitched roof and a hipped belfry. Neklyudovo (Bor) (Nizhny Novgorod region).

Tent temples with a tent covering the naos differ from cage temples by their vertical composition and great height. Researchers distinguish the following subtypes of tent temples:

- A tent on a quatrefoil base. Such structures have not been preserved.
- Pillar temple: a tent on an octagonal base "from the ground" with a single sideboard of the altar. Similar structures have not survived.
- Pillar-shaped temple: a tent on an octagonal base "from the ground" with two outbuildings — the altar and the refectory.
- "Temple of Twenty Walls: a tent on an octagonal base "from the ground" with several outbuildings — altar, refectory, and north and south aisles.
- The tent stands on an octagonal base, which in turn is located on the central part of the baptized log cabin.
- Octagon on a quatrefoil: the octagonal base of the tent stands on a quatrefoil log cabin.
- Tent on a baptismal font: the tent is placed in the middle of a square and is flanked by the kokoshniks of the baptismal font. They are found along the Pinega and Mezen rivers.
- Multi-tent temples: 2 such objects have been preserved.
Varieties of tent temples

Church of St. Nicholas of Myra from Novinki village with a hipped roof on the quatrefoil. Danilovskoye (Vologda region).

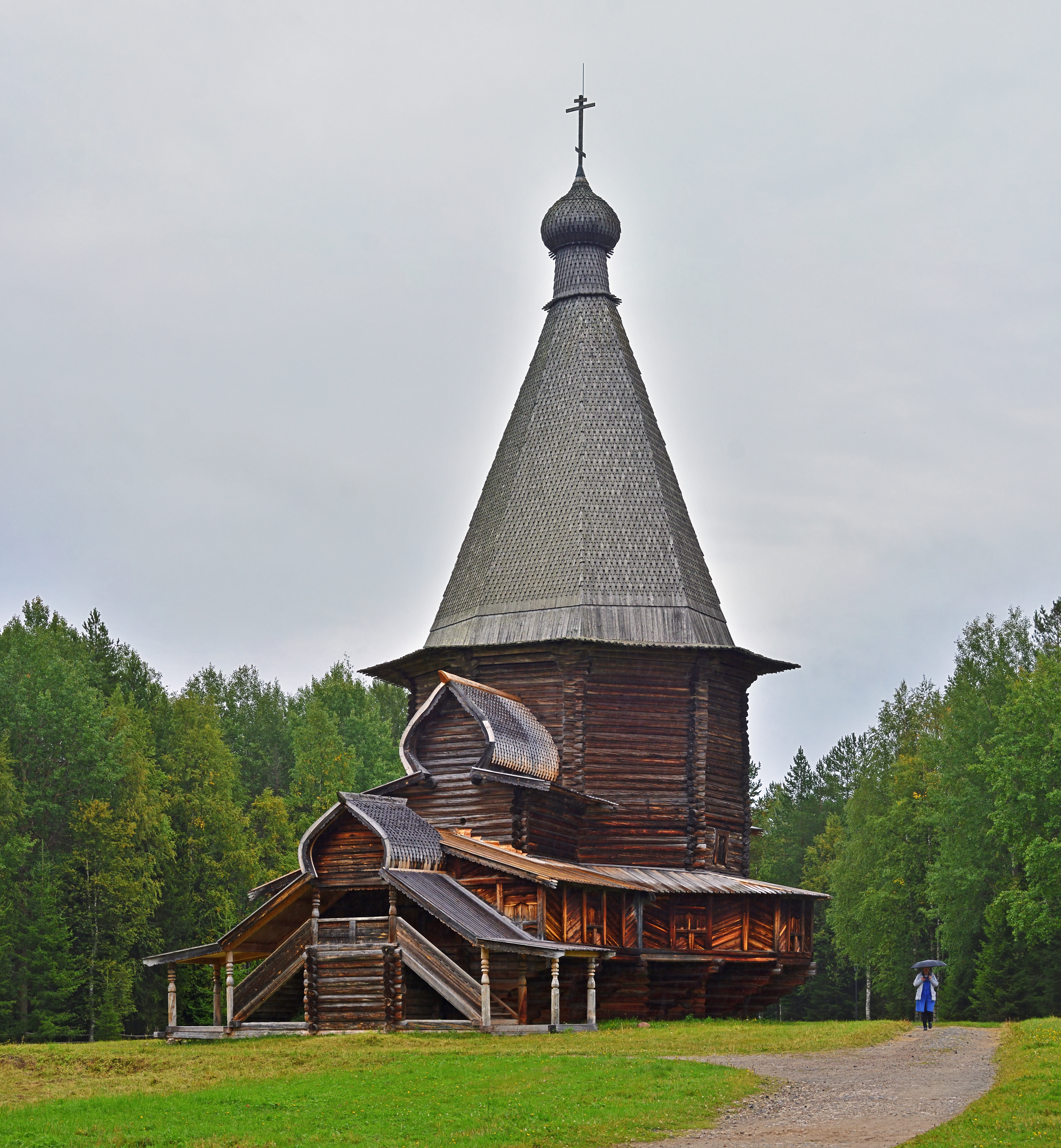
Church St. George the Victorious from the Vershina village, octagon "from the ground" with two outbuildings and a gallery. Malye Korely (Arkhangelsk region).

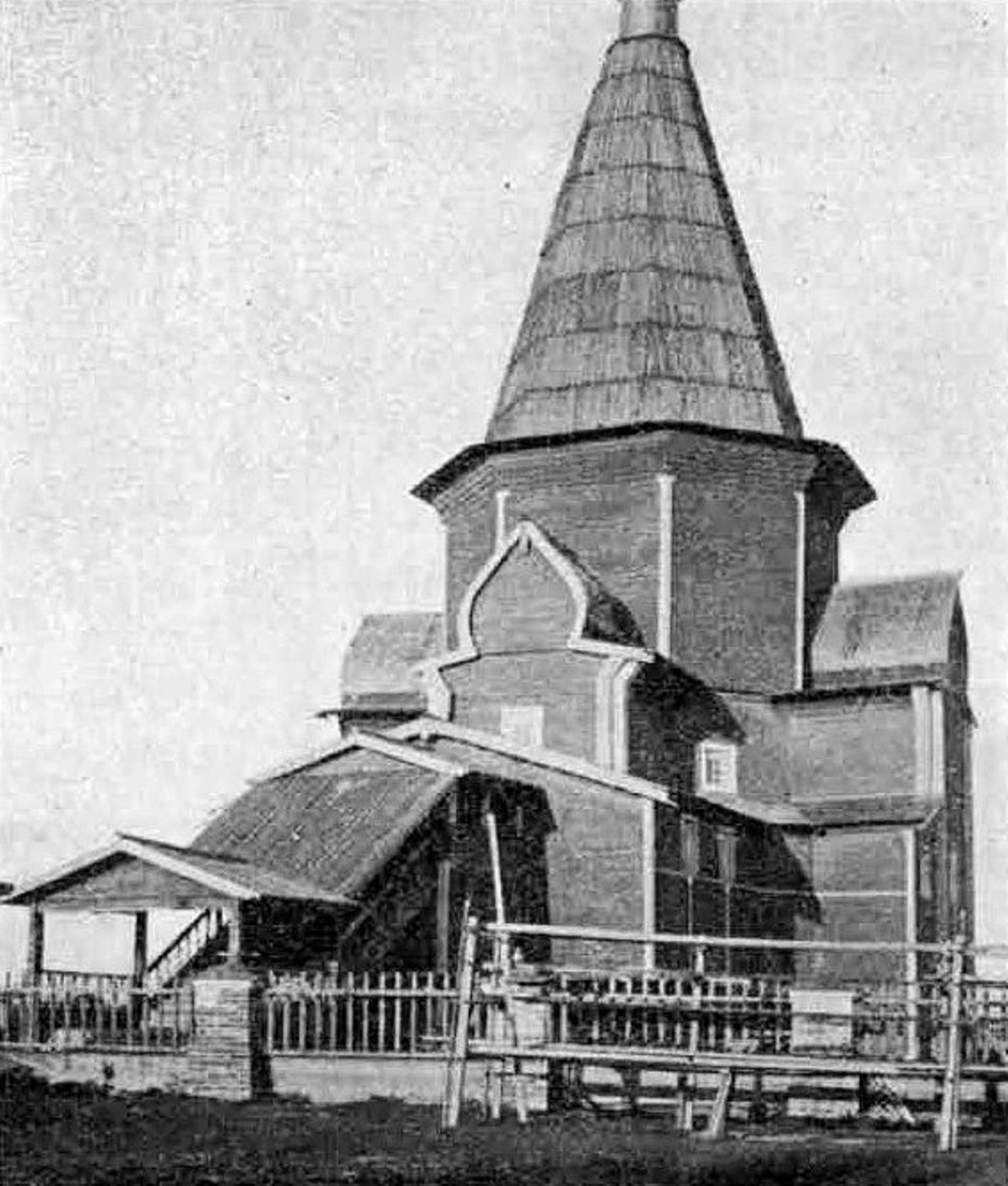
Nativity church "about twenty walls". (Yakovlevskaya, Arkhangelsk region).

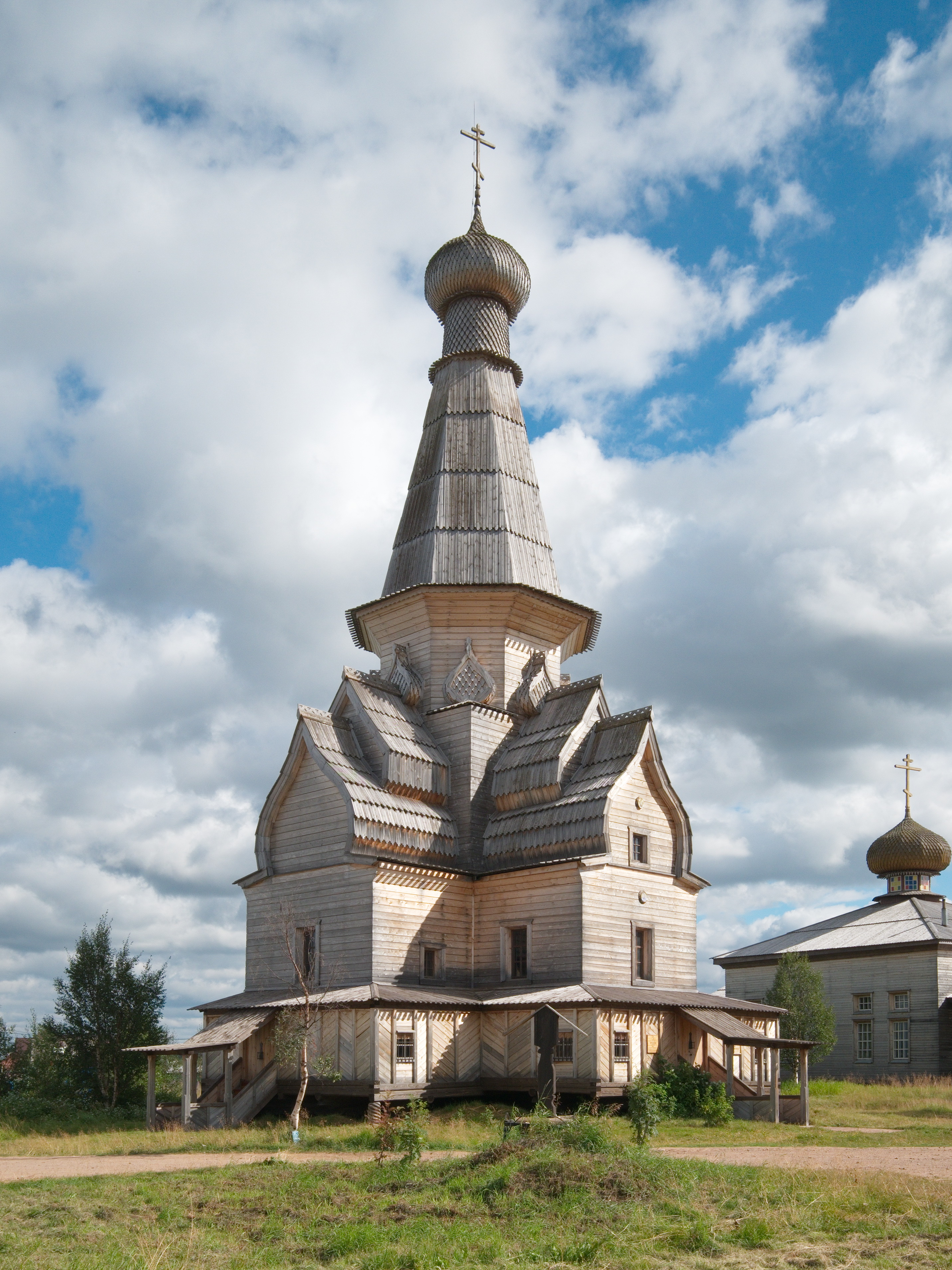
Dormition church, a tent on a baptismal base. Varzuga (Murmansk region).

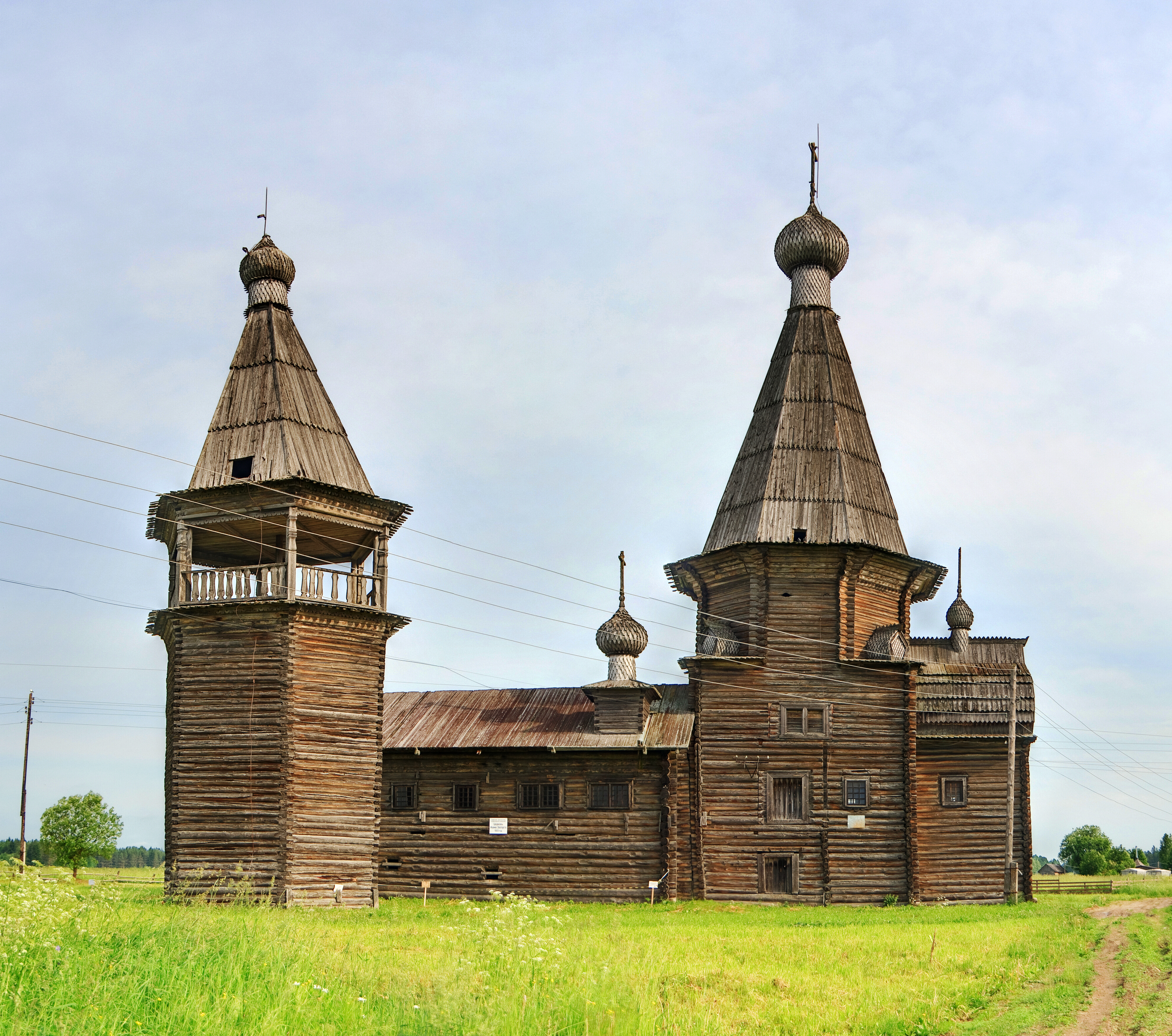
St. John Chrysostom's church, octagon on a quatrefoil. Saunino (Kiprovo). (Arkhangelsk region).

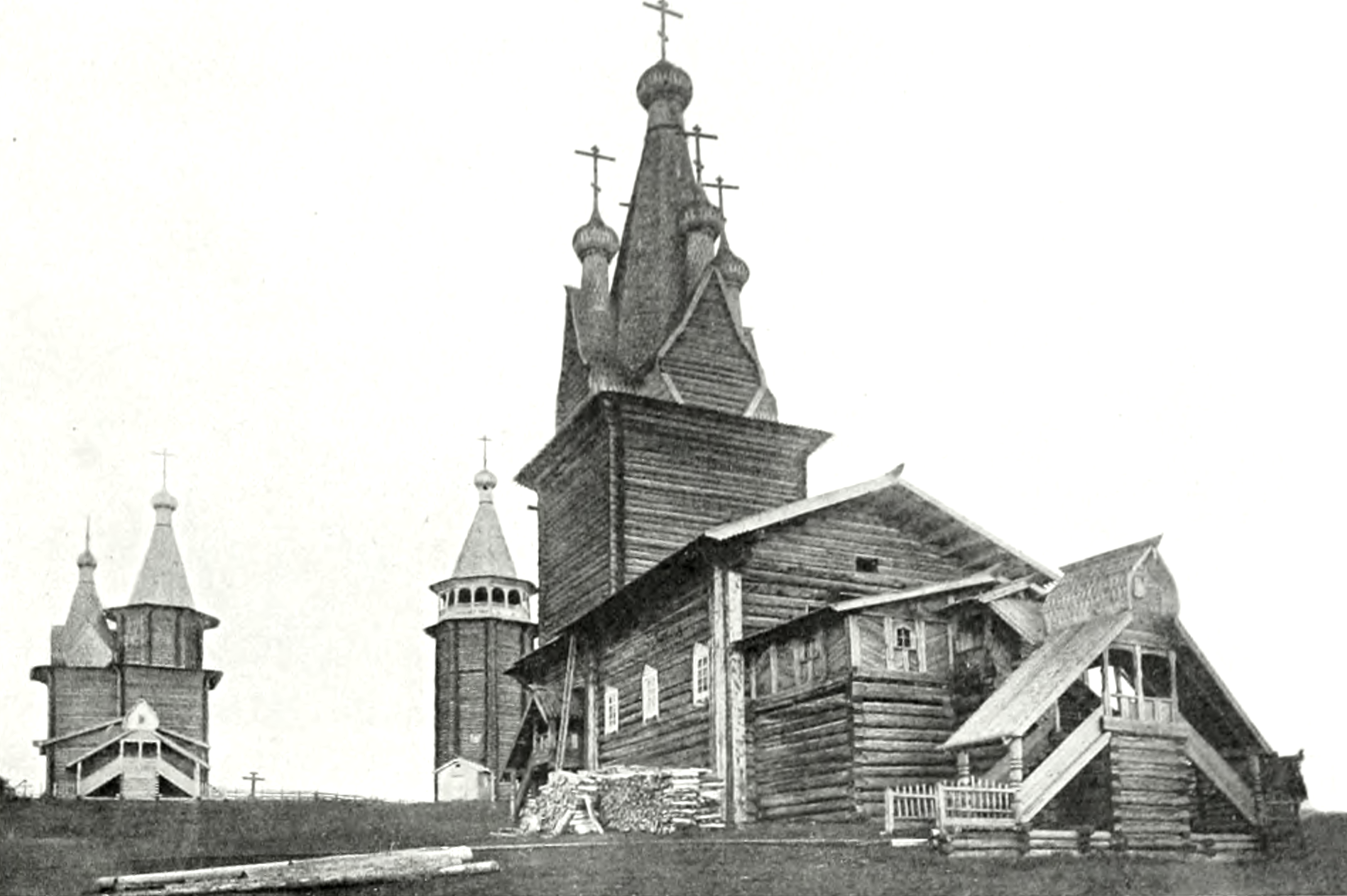
Church of Archistratigus Michael with a tent on a baptized barrel. Yuroma (Arkhangelsk region).

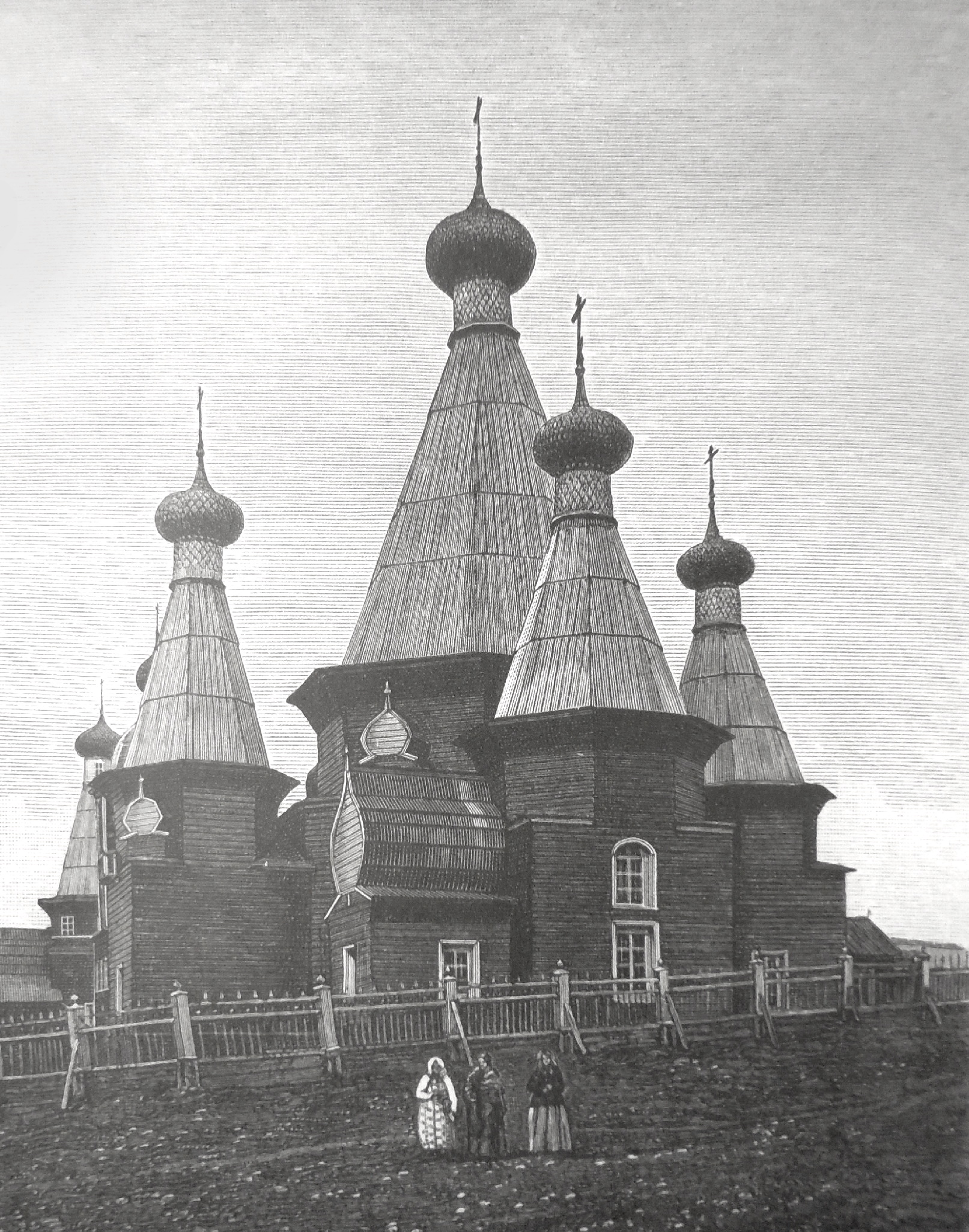
Trinity church with five hipped roofs. Nyonoksa (Arkhangelsk region)

A tiered temple has a stepped composition of several tiers, i.e. log cabins placed on top of each other, each of which is narrower than the one below. This type is characteristic of Central Russia. Stepped temples could have different endings and different forms of steps in the plan. The most widespread sub-type is the quatrefoil with one or more octaves placed on it. Often there are temples where all the tiers are octagonal (characteristic of the northeastern regions of European Russia) or quatrefoil (characteristic of the northwestern regions). Tiered temples were completed with a single head on a hollow closed cover or in later times with a dome.

Tiered, cube-shaped, domed and multi-domed temples

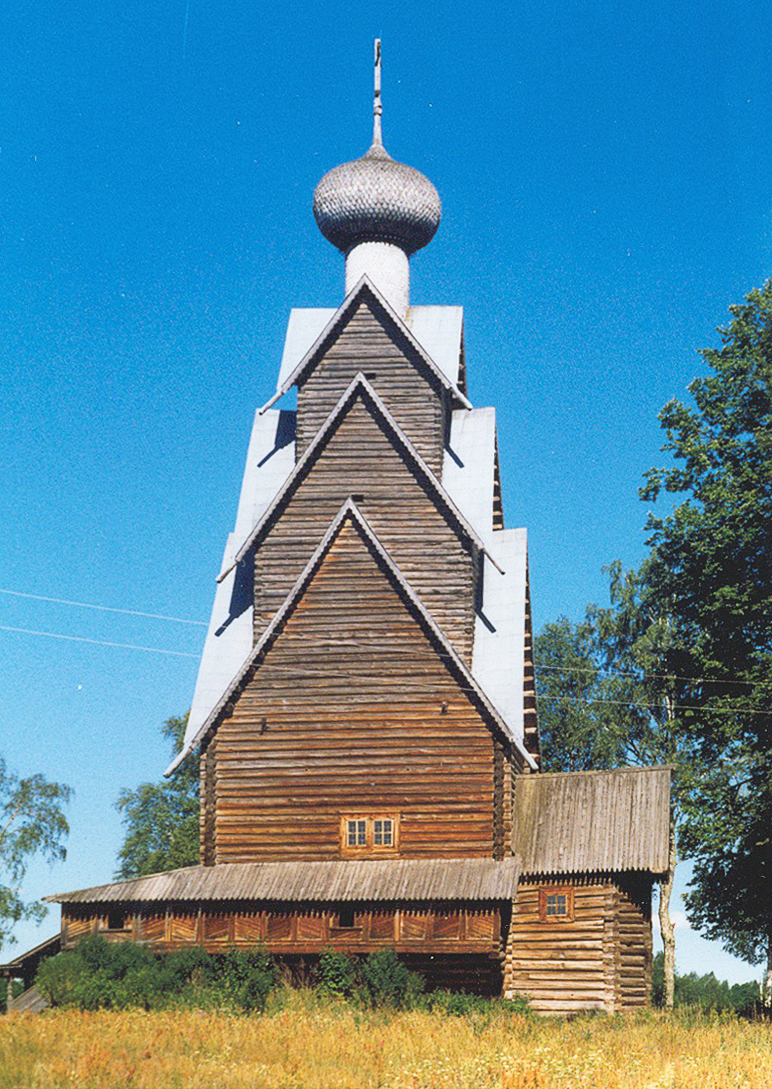
Quadrilateral tiered church of St. John the Baptist. Shirkov pogost (Tver region).

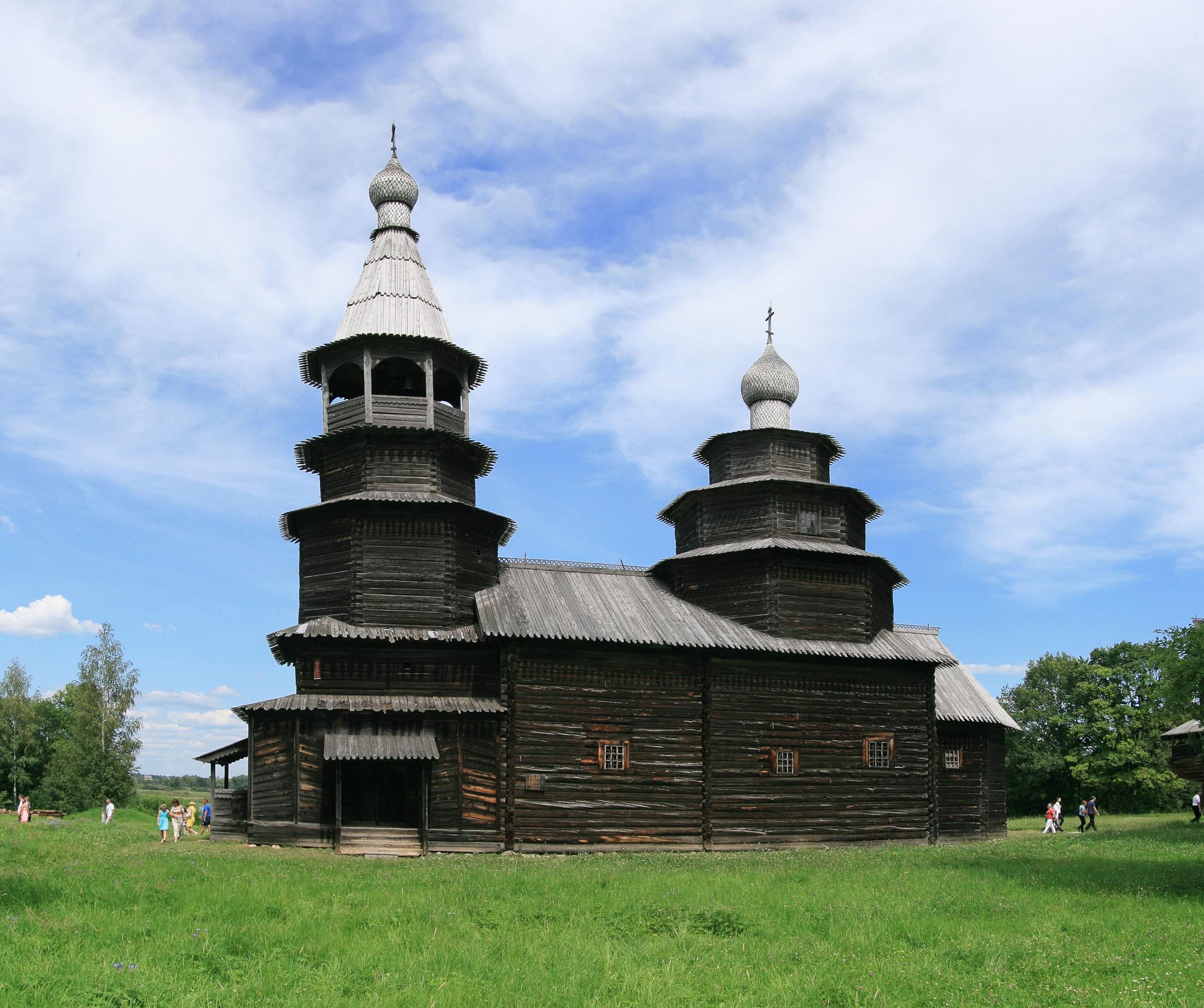
Tiered church of St. Nicholas of Myra from Vysokiy Ostrov village, octagon on a quatrefoil. Vitoslavlitsy (Novgorod region).

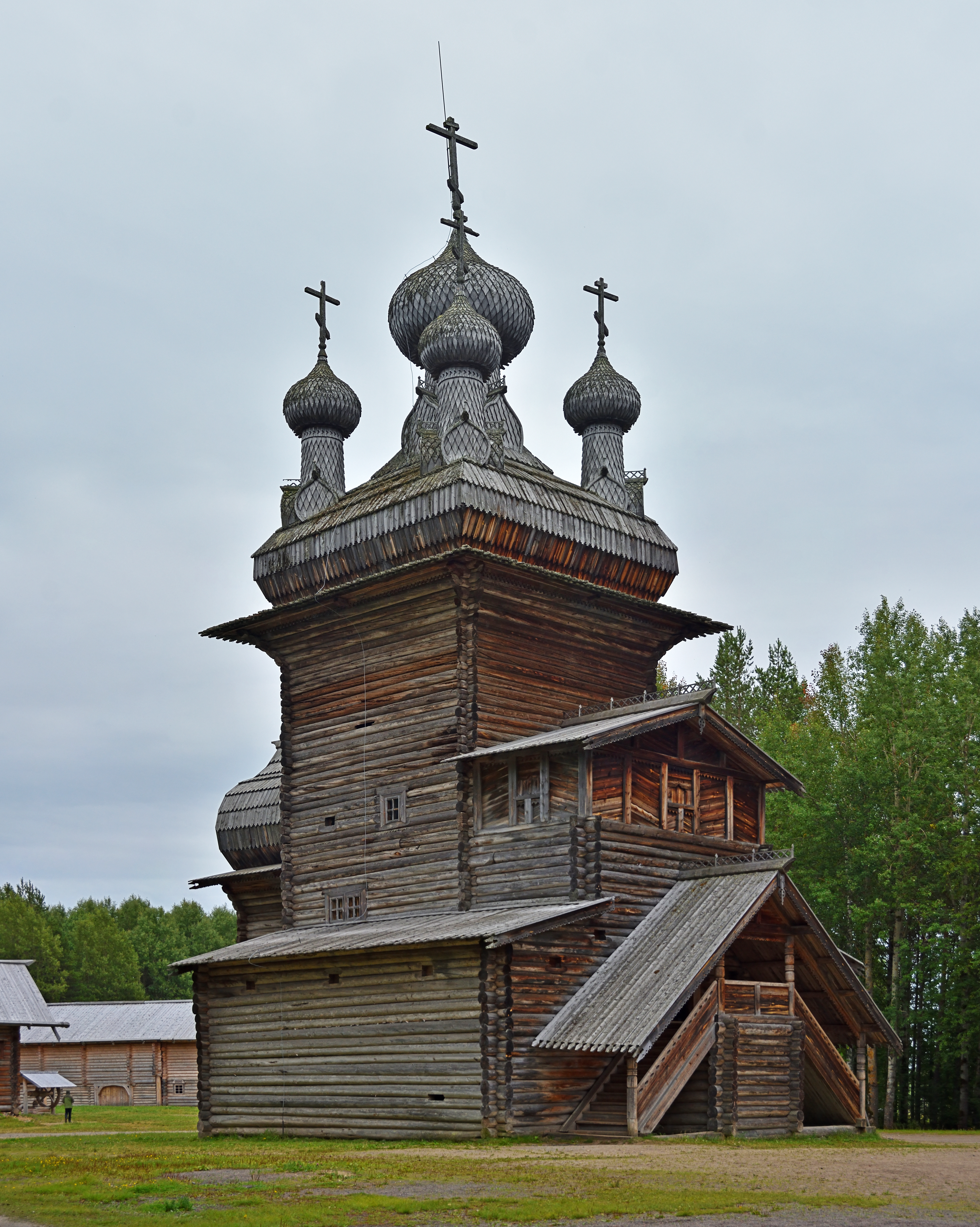
Cube church of Ascension in the Kusherka village. Malye Korely (Arkhangelsk region).

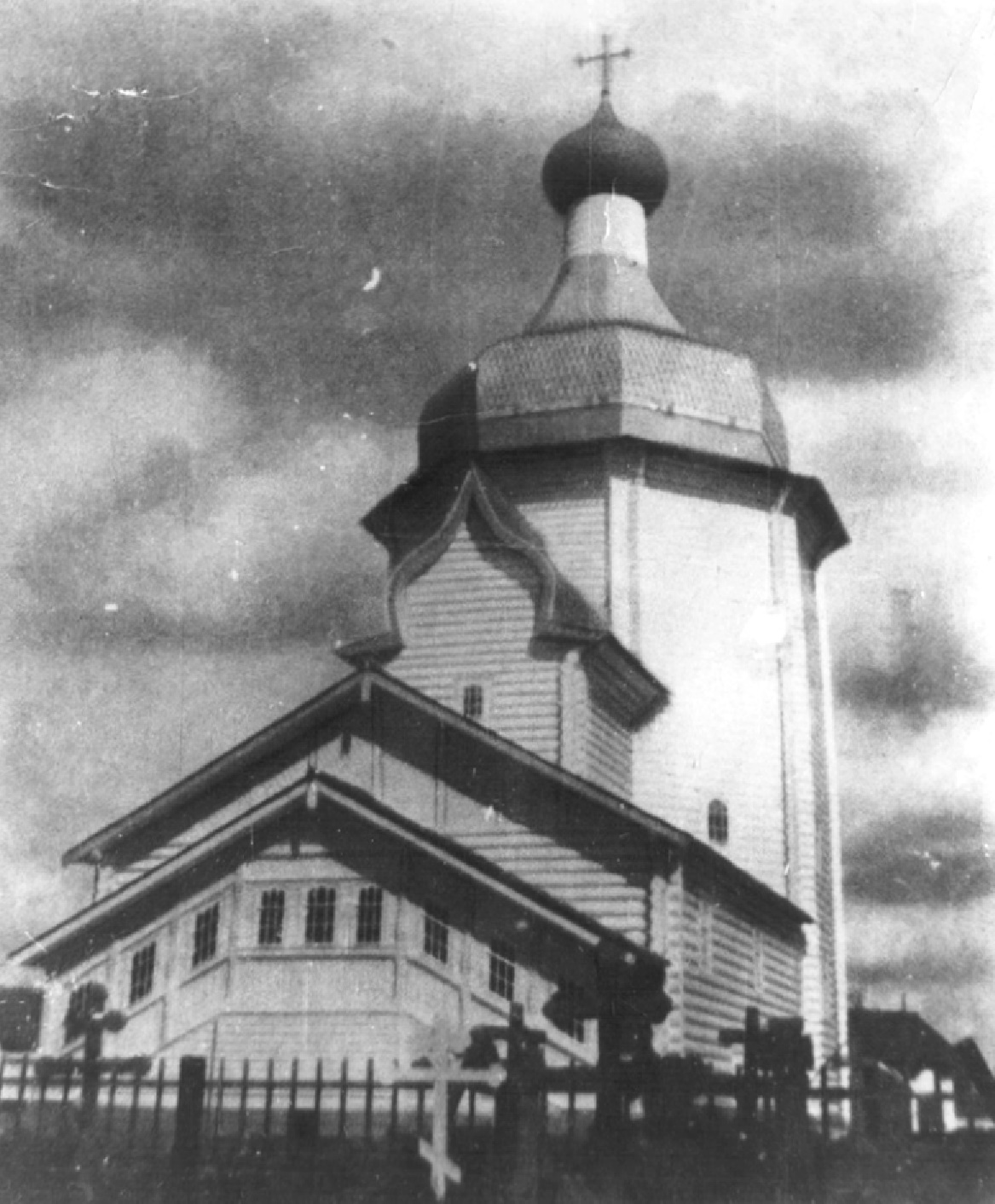
Church of St. Nicholas of Myra with onion-shaped covering (hollow). Zachachye (Arkhangelsk region).

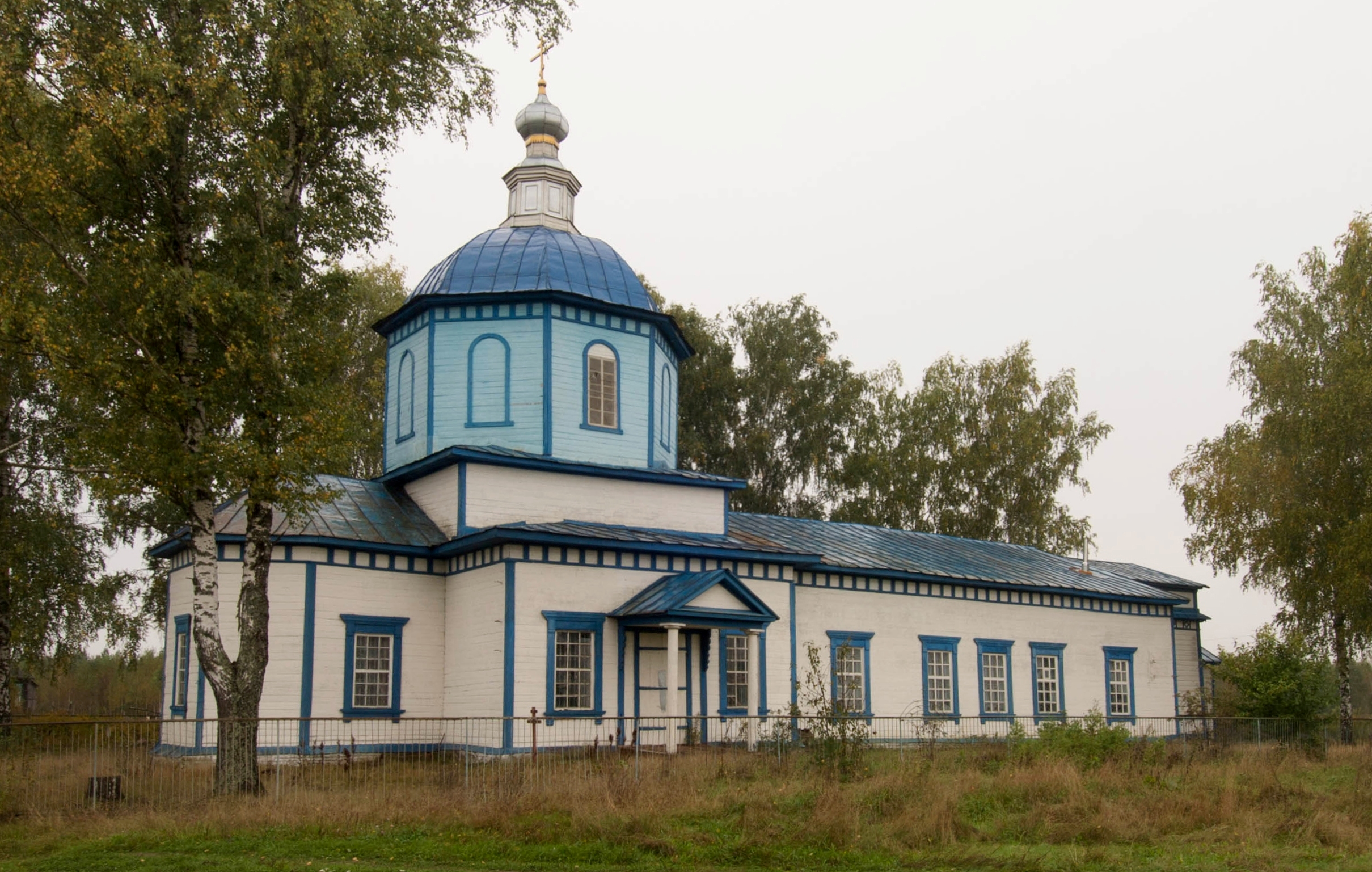
Dome Vvedenskaya church. Boriskovo (Ryazan region).

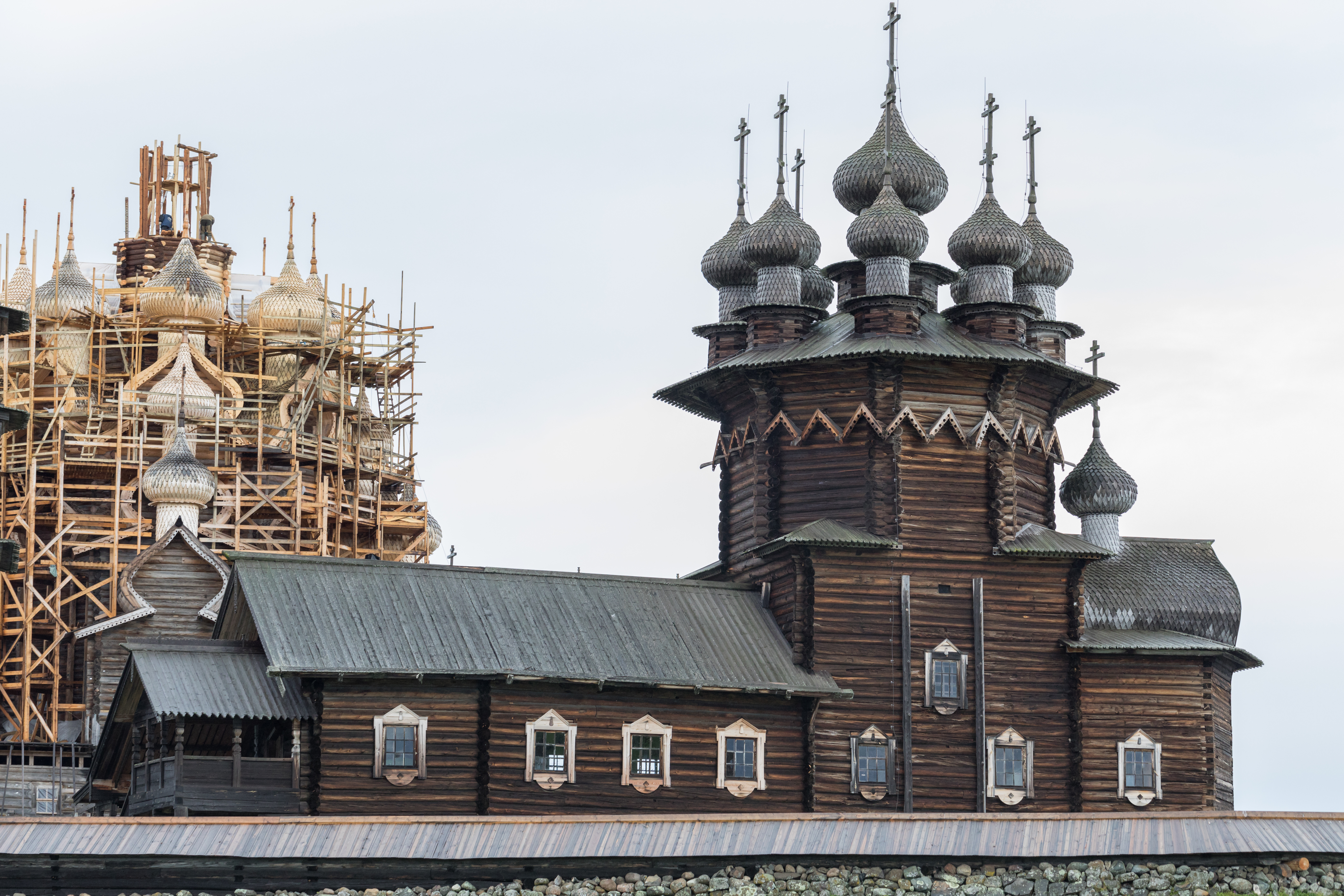
The multi-domed Pokrovskaya Church. Kizhi Pogost (Karelia)

The cube-shaped temples include temples where the nave was covered with a cube on a four-sided base. There are known cases of cubes covering the aisles. The number (from one to ten) and location of onion chapters on such churches varied arbitrarily. They are characteristic of the Ponezh and the White Sea coast.

Temples covered with a naos dome are very rare in Russian wooden architecture. Sometimes they include temples with octagonal onion-shaped ends (puchinas), resembling a cube in their structure, characteristic of Povaozhye and Siberia. I. E. Grabar considered five-domed churches to be a "known approach" to multicapital churches. Temples with more than five chapters became one of the most striking pages of Russian wooden architecture. However, despite the apparent complexity of their composition, the layout is quite simple. On the basis of a few types of plans, complicating and supplementing them with corridors, galleries and refectories, raising buildings on basements and modifying the forms of coverings, the architects achieved greater diversity in volume and silhouette.

==== The churches' development ====
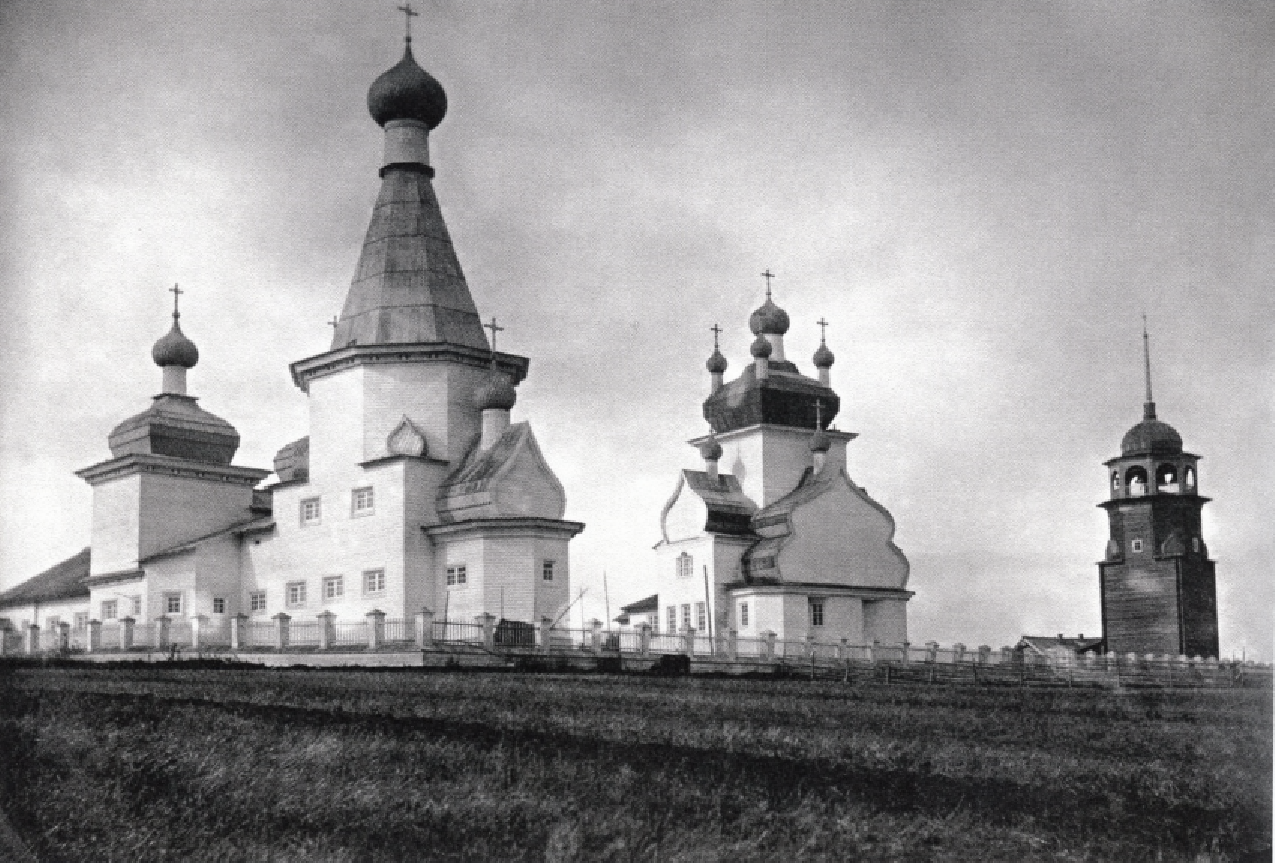
The ensemble of the Turchasovsky pogost (Arkhangelsk region), 1780s–1790s

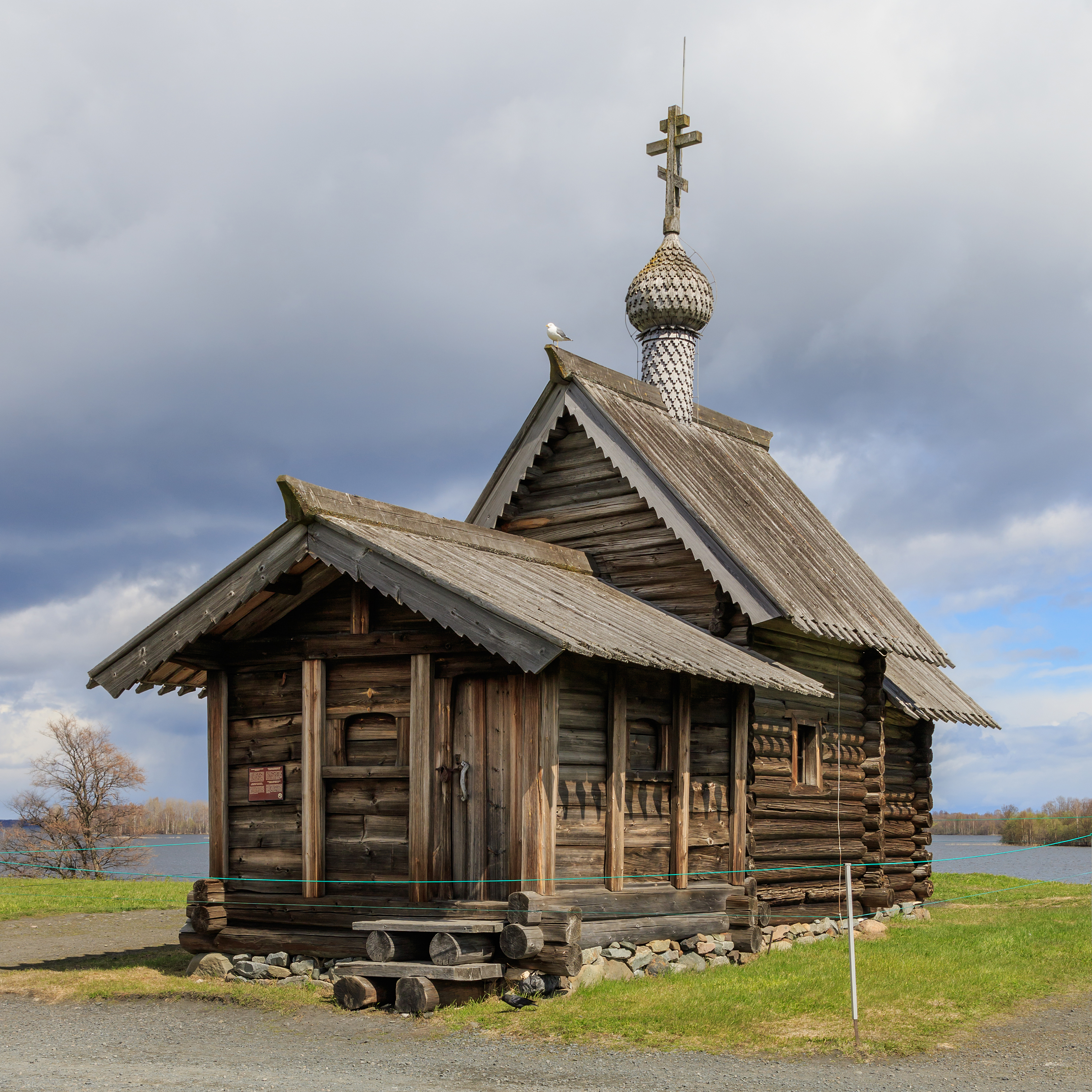
Lazar's Church from the Murom monastery in Kizhi (Karelia). Dated to the 15th century. Probably the oldest monument of Russian wooden architecture.

The spread of Christianity in Russia brought with it the need to build churches, which could not always be satisfied by stone buildings. Ancient wooden church architecture developed under the influence of stone architecture, defense and residential buildings. Already in the pre-Mongol period there were various solutions for the volume and construction of churches, such as square log churches and double log churches with a separate square log choir. The tripartite Byzantine altars were probably replaced by single apsidal altars soon after the Baptism of Russia. Archaeological finds and chronicle sources testify to elaborate octagonal and stepped endings. Old Russian wooden architecture adopted elements of stone architecture and reworked them for use in wood.

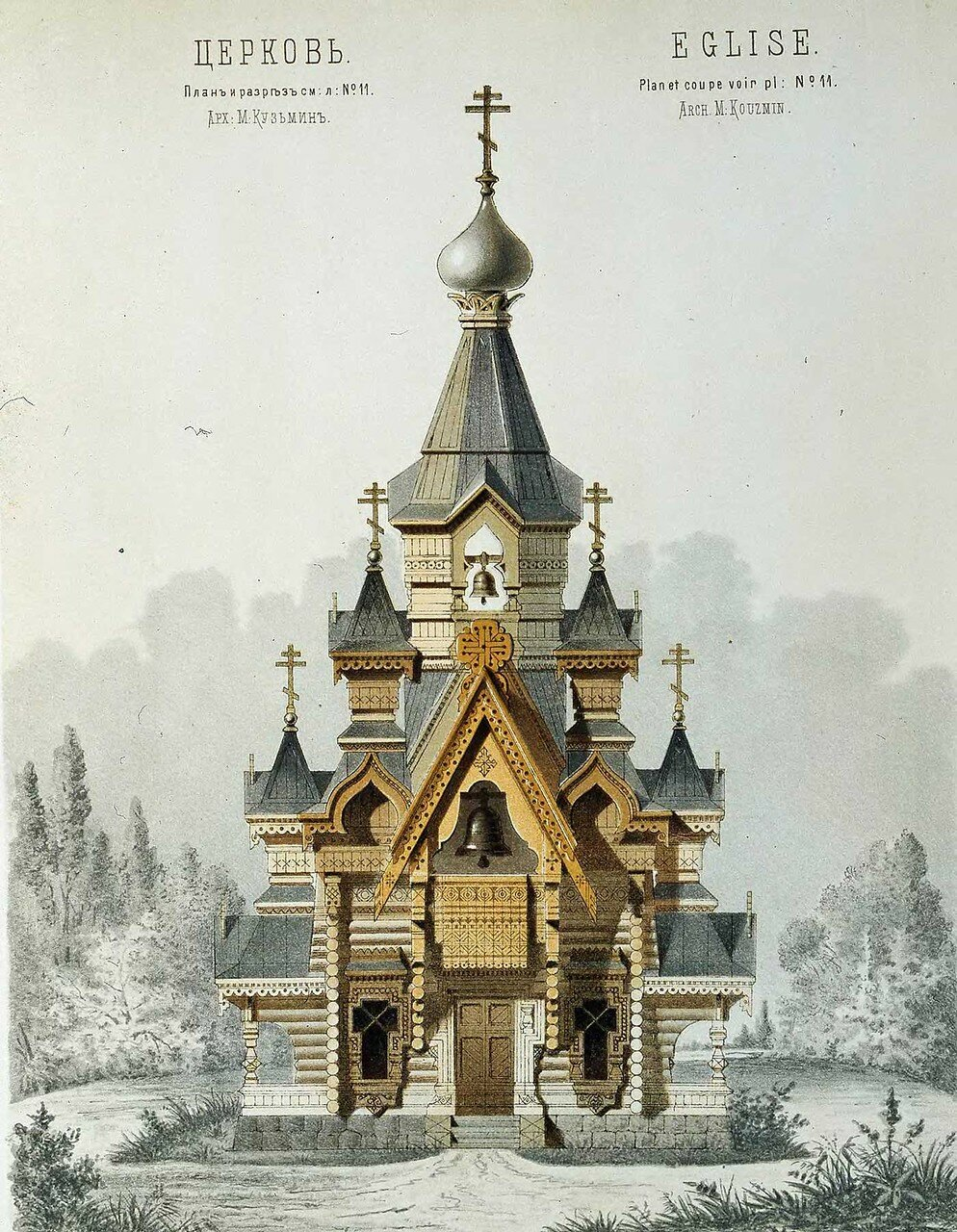
The project of a church in the Russian style, 1870s.

Cell temples are the earliest type, with roots in the Byzantine canon and local traditions such as cultic barns. These structures often had no dome and outwardly resembled residential buildings. An example is the Church of Rizopopologija from Borodav, built in 1485. The Church of Lazarus from the Murom Monastery is considered older, if its dating to the end of the 14th century is correct. Cell churches, in order to stand out, raised the height of the log cabin and changed the design of the roof, which can be seen in the Church of St. George in Yuksovichi in 1495.

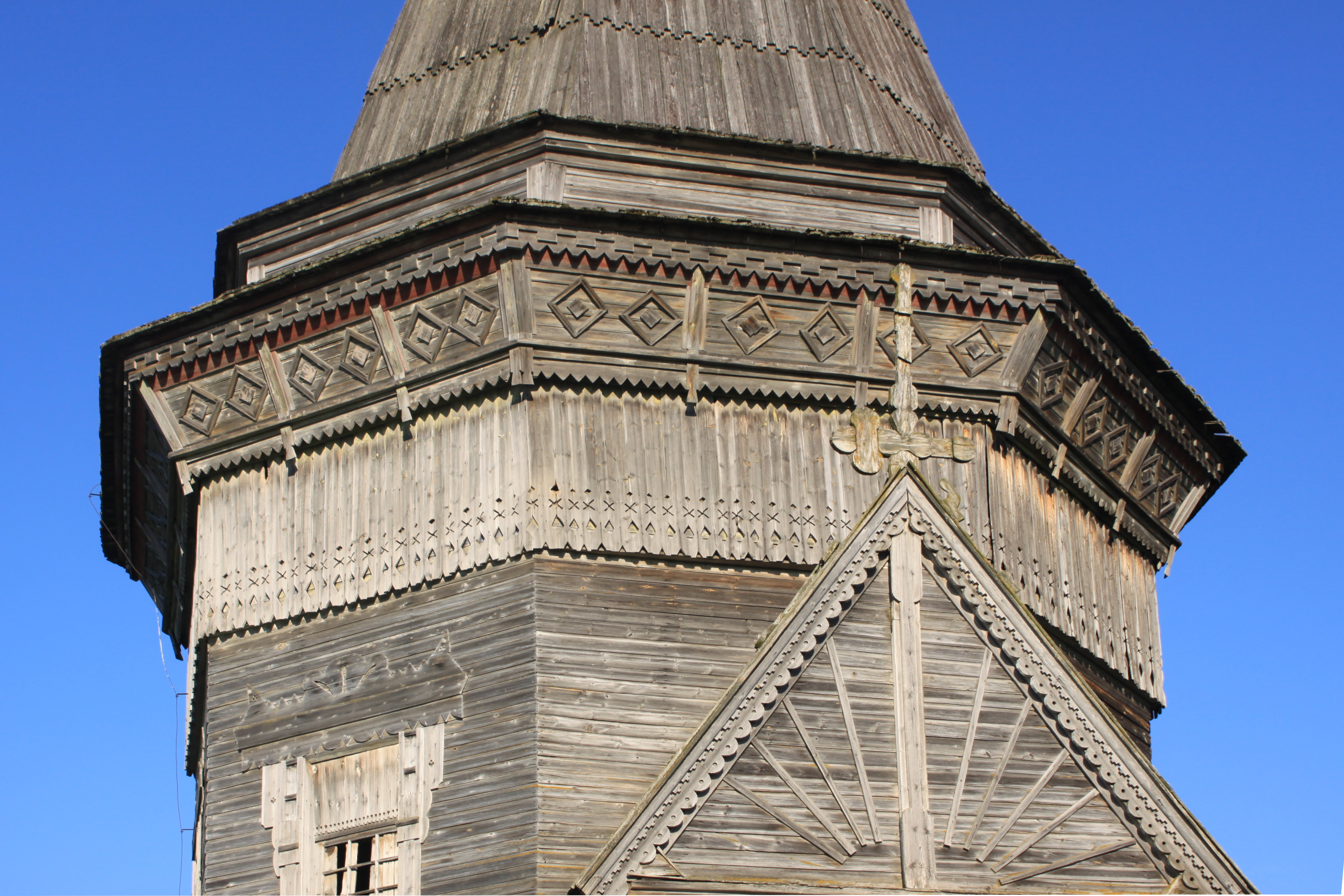
A stump, paneled and turned into a cornice. An example of ancient temples' "renovation" in the spirit of eclecticism of the 19th century.

Tent temples may have existed in pre-Mongol times and included various forms, such as tents on a quatrefoil base and column-shaped temples. Tents became an analog of the dome and were used to increase the area of the prayer room. The oldest surviving tent church is the St. Nicholas Church in Lyavla from the 1580s. Tent churches of the 16th century have a vertical composition and a full facade. In the 17th century, despite Patriarch Nikon's ban on the construction of tent churches, attempts to create multi-spherical and stepped churches continued. Cube-shaped churches began to appear in the mid-17th century, such as the Pyatnitskaya Church in Shuertsky in 1666.

Tiered temples, including nine-domed and multi-domed churches of the 18th century, also had significant development. Examples include the Church of Intercession in Ankhimov and the Church of the Transfiguration in Kizhi Pogost. These churches reflect the 17th century tendencies toward high-rise and disjointed artistic form.

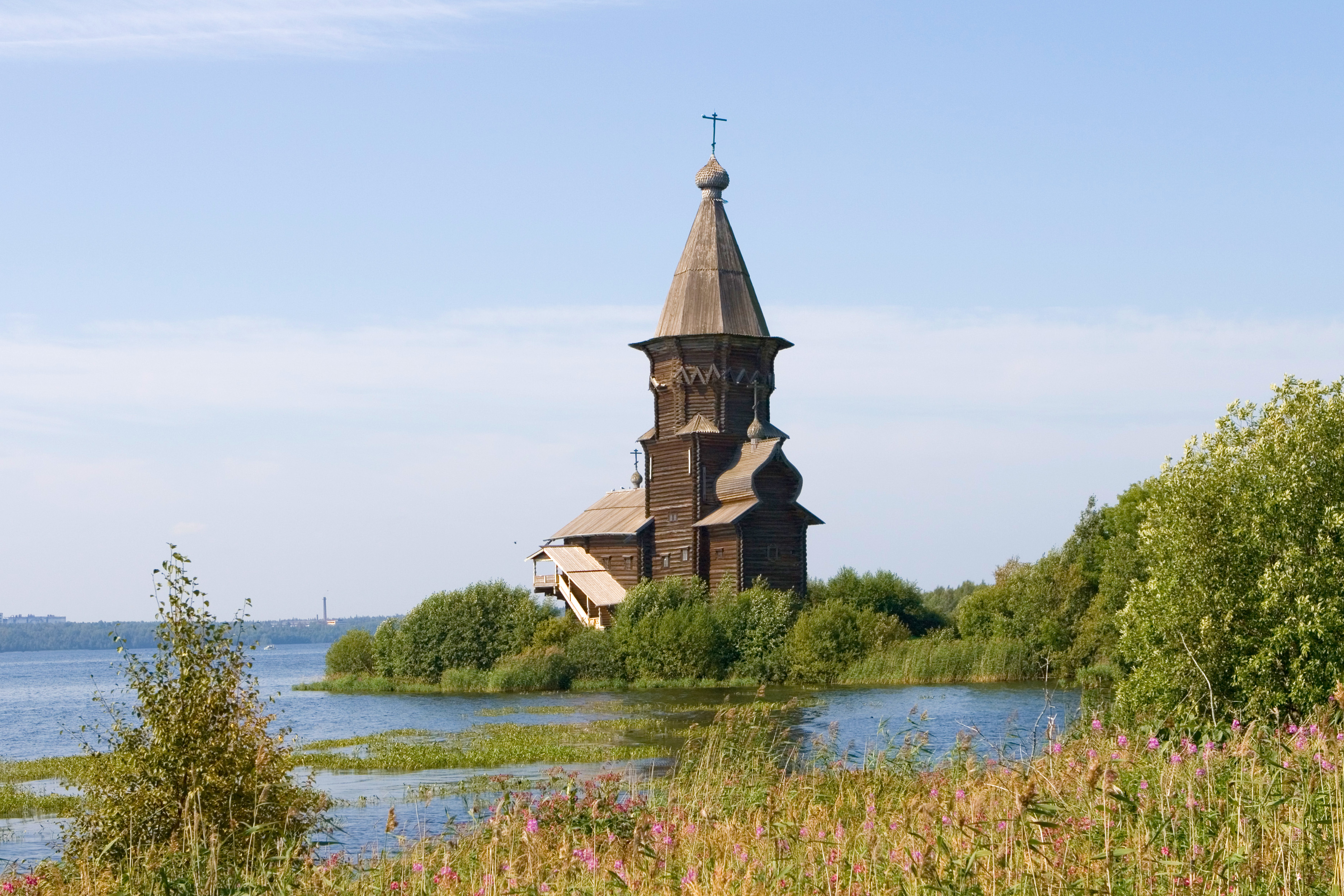
Dormition Church, Kondopoga, Karelia. 1774 One of the best monuments of the "tent style".

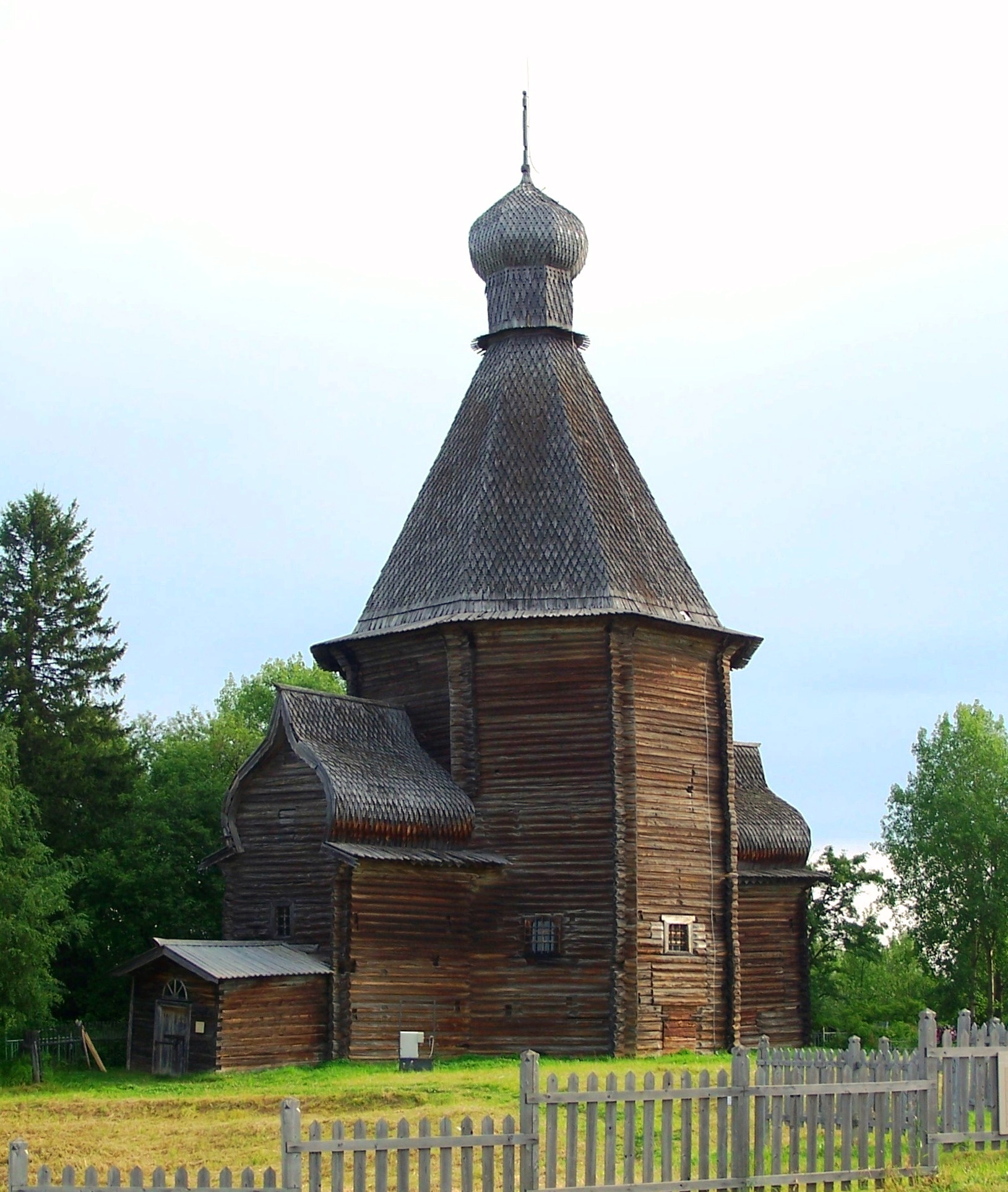
St. Nicholas church in Lyavla (Arkhangelsk region). The oldest preserved tent church from the 1580s.

In the 18th century, wooden architecture continued to develop despite the influence of urban architecture and reforms. An example of the latter is the Church of the Dormition of the Theotokos in Kondopoga, built in 1774. At the end of the century, a late period began, characterized by respect for tradition and bold innovation at the same time. In the early 19th century, with the introduction of government decrees, traditional forms began to disappear and wooden churches took on an "urban" appearance. However, the construction of wooden churches continued in remote settlements, preserving elements of the old architecture.

Since the late 1980s, wooden church construction has resumed, with an emphasis on traditional principles, although modern structures differ from traditional examples.

=== Bell towers ===
Bell towers in Russian wooden architecture probably appeared in the 15th century with the spread of bells. The simplest of them were belfries in the form of crossbars on poles, which have not survived to the present day. Frame belfries had 4, 5 or 9 supporting pillars, several open tiers and a hipped roof. They are almost not preserved. The most developed of them were in Pomorie and had a number of similarities with their northern European counterparts (inclination of the pillars to the center, cross struts). Log belfries became more widespread. Their construction includes, together with the log house, the pillars of the belfry inserted inside the log house. Most often they are six or octagonal from the ground or in the form of an octagon on a quatrefoil. The latter type was the most stable and was built until the end of the 19th century. The architecture of freestanding log belfries is based on the figurative characteristics of high-rise churches. Above the corners of the high quadrilaterals of some bell towers there were decorative kokoshniks. Since the second half of the 18th century, under the influence of urban architecture, the practice of combining a bell tower and a church in one building spreads.

=== Chapels ===
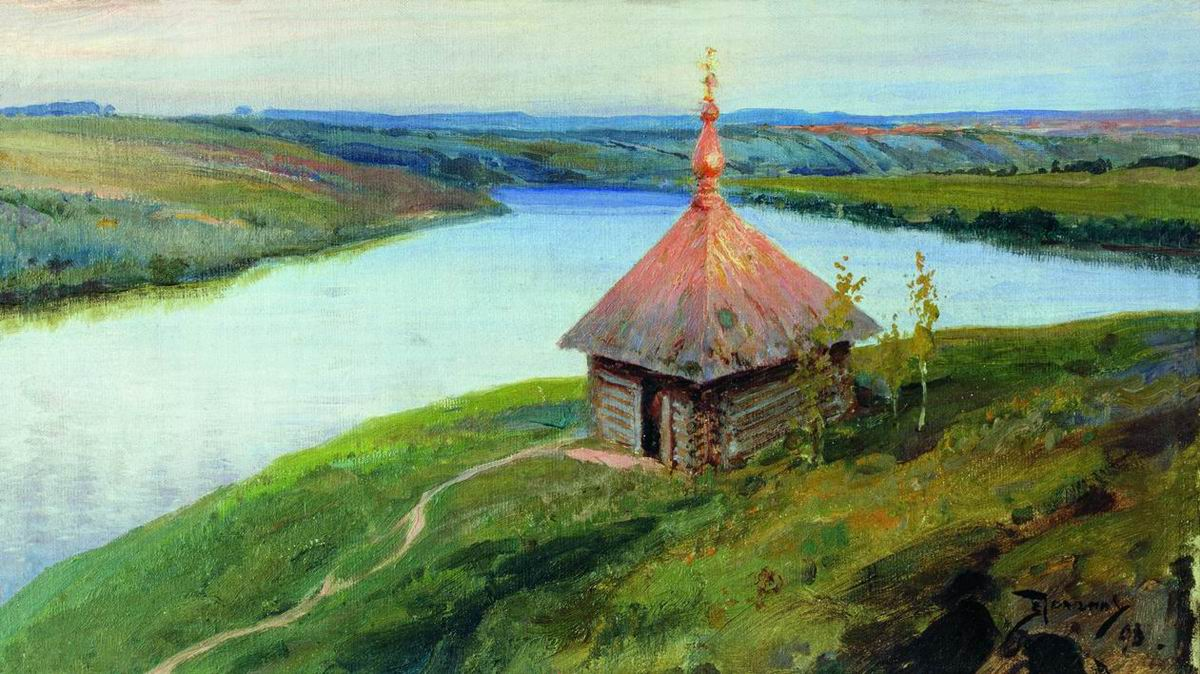
V. D. Polenov. A Chapel on the bank of the Oka River, 1893.

A very common type of wooden religious buildings were chapels, which differed from churches by the absence of an altar. Chapels are architecturally close to churches, but have simpler solutions and are usually smaller in size. The most common are cage chapels with a simple two-pitch roof. Chapels with four- and eight-pitch roofs, hipped roofs, and stepped roofs are less common. Cage chapels on the western side were often supplemented with haylofts, large rooms resembling refectories, belfries. Cantilevered galleries were a common element: in cage chapels with a double gabled roof, the galleries were usually placed symmetrically to the longitudinal axis on one or three sides. Chapels with a central composition could have galleries surrounding the log cabin on all sides. The most ancient chapels have been preserved in Obonezhye.

=== Minor architectural forms ===
Not only buildings, but also various small architectural forms were made of wood. Wooden sidewalks were widespread in cities. Grave crosses and other attributes of cemeteries were made of wood. The Old Believers of the North still have domovinas — gravestones cut down or made of planks. According to ancient beliefs, the spirit of the deceased dwells in the domovina, and therefore it is given forms characteristic of huts. Very similar to the tombstones are the crosses of worship and commemoration, which the Russians from time immemorial have liked to mark various points of special importance to them. Often they were placed as a vow or as a navigation sign. In the north they were placed under a canopy resembling an open chapel. Despite their small size, they play an important role in the village ensemble, reproducing various elements peculiar to wooden architecture. Palisades, fences and hedges were used as fences in the past. Very expressive are oblique hedges made of vertical posts and inclined poles tied to them.

== Construction techniques and artistic expressions ==
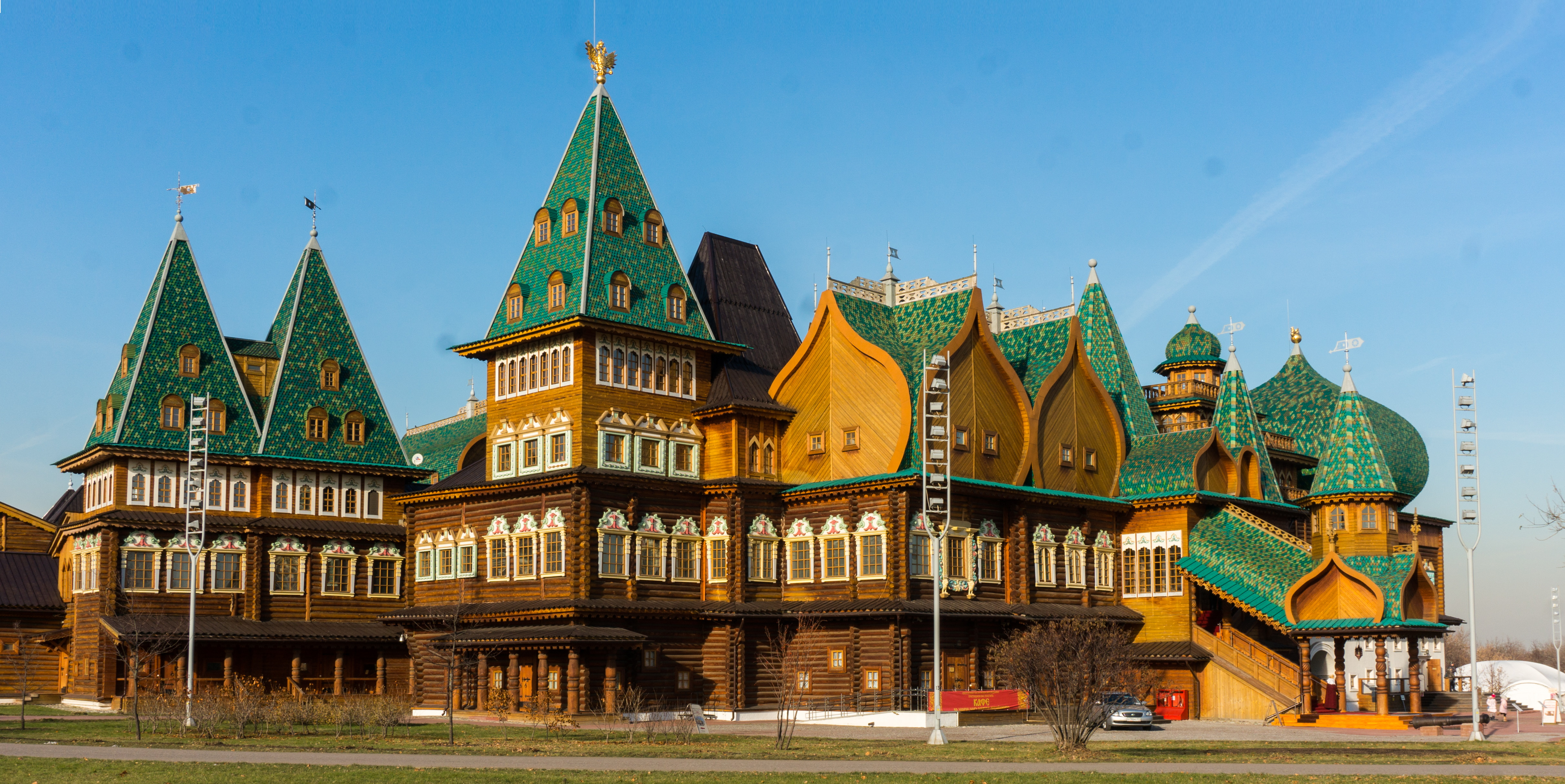
The palace of Tsar Alexei Mikhailovich in Kolomenskoye (Moscow) demonstrates a traditional approach to the construction of volumetric and spatial composition. A copy was built in 2010.

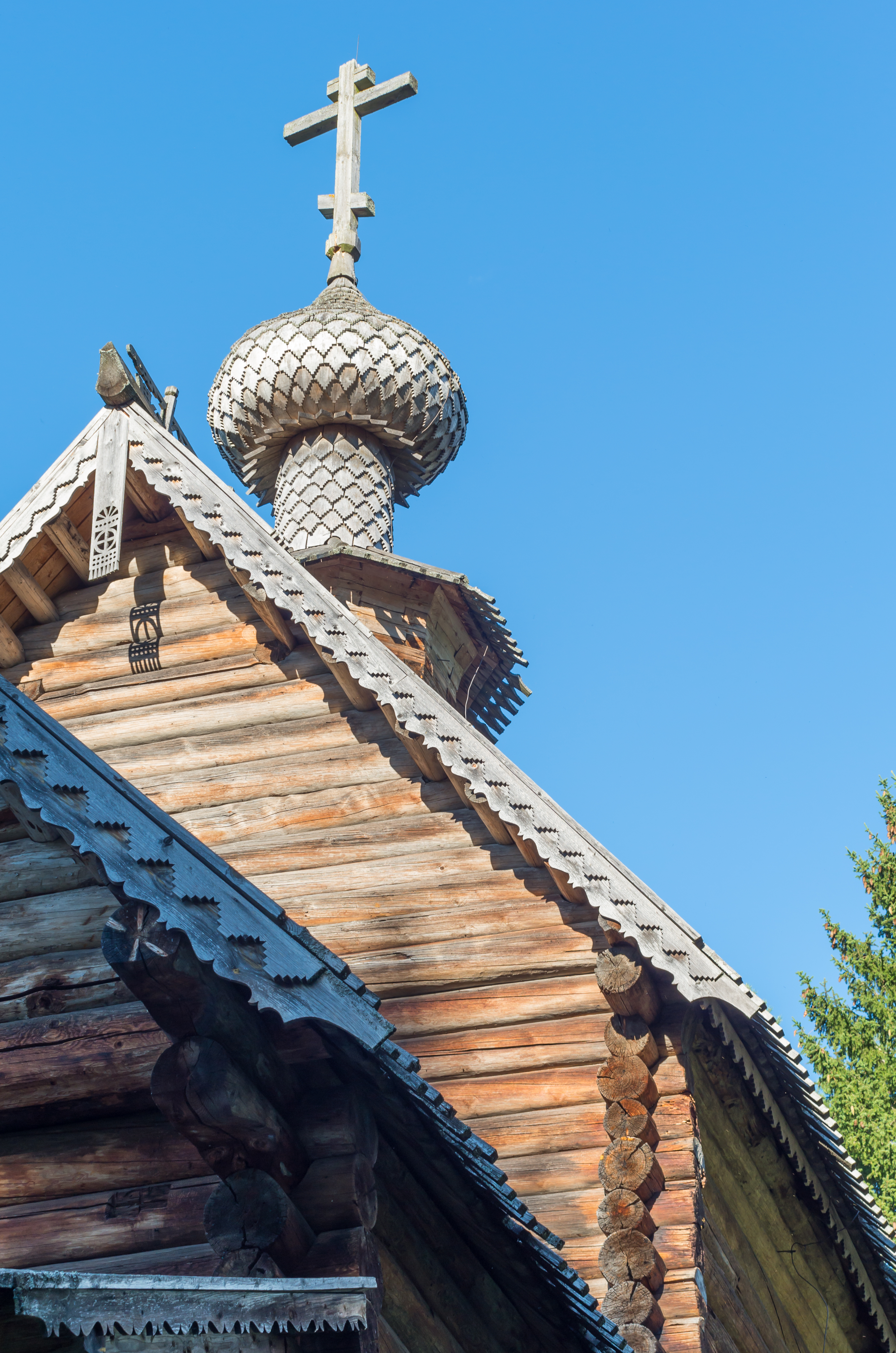
Wooden architecture is characterized by the combination of power and simplicity of the log cabin with delicate details treatment.

In Russian art criticism, it is generally believed that wooden architecture is much more authentic and rich than stone architecture, and reflects the views of broad strata of the Russian people, especially the peasantry. The Russian art historian E. V. Khodakovsky considers it "the most Russian of all Russian art". The American Slavist W. K. Brumfield cites wooden architecture, along with constructivism, as the most significant achievements of Russian architecture. The Norwegian architectural historian K. Norberg-Schultz believed that Russian wooden architecture, despite its many "charming manifestations," was primitive in comparison with European architecture, since log construction does not allow such possibilities of design as the frame. He noted that the lively and fairy-tale look of Russian houses is given by the decoration of windows, doors, cornices, which is not related to the construction. It was the criterion of the relationship between artistic and constructive allowed A. V. Opolovnikov to distinguish from the "folk" Old Russian wooden architecture, in which the constructive and artistic are united, late style architecture, where wood is hidden by the finish and acts only as a material of construction, and eclectic buildings, combining elements of Old Russian architecture and style architecture. The latter two directions A.V. Opolovnikov evaluated negatively, although he recognized that they gave birth not only to "false in its ornamentation" buildings, but also very successful, for example, decorated with lace carving houses of the Volga region. The sphere of Russian wooden architecture can include modern attempts to revive old Russian carpentry traditions.

The book Russian Wooden Architecture (1942) emphasized the following features: a combination of delicate treatment of details with the power and simplicity of the main volumes; picturesque, asymmetrical arrangement of few and carefully worked openings; more detailed exterior treatment of residential buildings, particularly choirs, in comparison with religious objects; few planned solutions, structural and architectural forms; special attention of architects to coverings, their silhouettes, and proportions. A. I. Nekrasov wrote about log construction in space, stating that it does not spread on the ground and in this respect is static, and its beauty lies rather in its upward aspiration. The traditional volumetric-spatial composition is based on a picturesque combination of log cabins, subordinated to the requirements of convenience. Such is the palace of Alexei Mikhailovich. It is indicative that each log cabin had its own separate roof. The influence of Western architecture is associated with the connection of identical log cabins under a single facade and a common roof, as well as many other features of late wooden architecture. According to A. I. Nekrasov, what is late and non-Russian refers to “everything that grows [on the building] as decoration and as a revitalization of the uniform mass”, and of the original in architecture — only a cubic mass of cage with a system of covering.

The basis of old Russian proportioning was the ratio of the side of a square to its diagonal (carpenters checked the correctness of a square log cabin by the equality of its diagonals), and Russian length measures were based on the same ratio. The planned dimensions of the building were used to determine its vertical dimensions. In log buildings, the module is usually quite large, for example, the length of the log between the joints. However, in later buildings, a smaller module, such as a quarter of a log's length, is often found. Some researchers are convinced of the existence of curvatures in wooden architecture.

Ancient buildings are characterized by the connection of elements using mortises, dowels, studs, grooves, and dowels with minimal use of expensive metal parts. Small dwellings and farm buildings might have had no metal parts at all. These connections allowed for easy disassembly and replacement of building elements. Many researchers note the conservatism and even primitiveness of the traditional Russian log cabin.

=== Tools ===
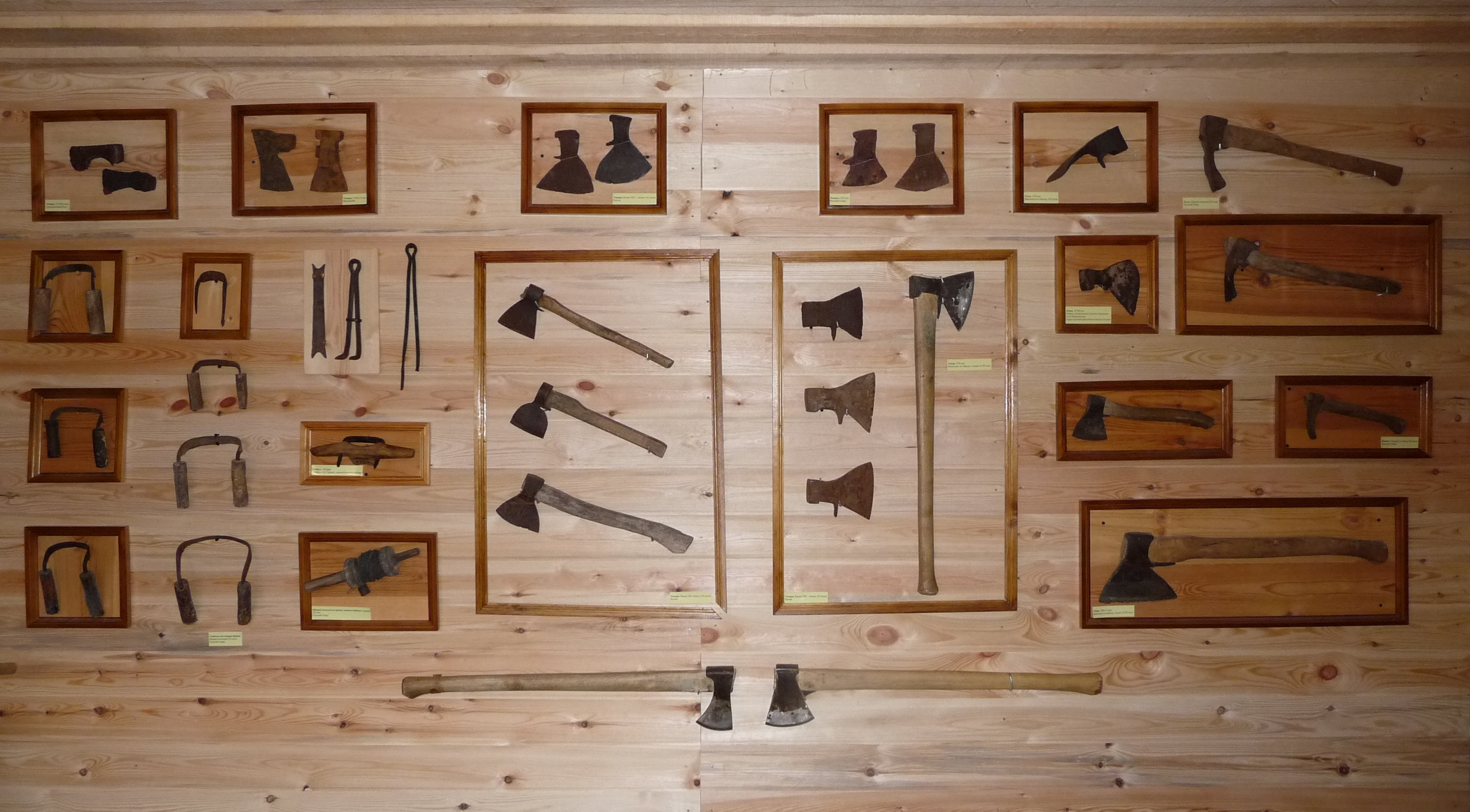
Russian carpentry tools in the Popov Museum

The main carpenter's tool was the axe. In addition to various types of axes, drawknife, adze, chisel, mallet, gimlet, and others were used. The saw was known in Russia since pre-Mongol times, but it became massively used only in the late period of the development of architecture. In addition to tools for woodworking, the carpenter needed marking and measuring devices, and equipment for moving logs. The carpenter's inventory expanded considerably in the 19th century with the introduction of carpentry tools. New methods of woodworking brought about a different attitude to wood. A. V. Popov notes that if folk architecture was created as a kind of sculpture, where unique logs "shaped" all the forms, then with the loss of the old carpentry thinking and the use of uniform elements, wood in later buildings began to lose its individuality.

=== Materials ===
Wood was used to make logs, poles, planks (boards), lumber, hewn battens, decorative elements, and other products. The main material was a round log. The most valuable are coniferous species: they are characterized by straightness, low warping, resistance to decay, density, absence of hollows and the property of easy splitting into boards. Pine is the most commonly used, with a preference for lodgepole pine with a fine layer structure. Larch is the most resistant to decay and has high strength, but it is difficult to work and rare. It was widely used in the Mezen and Pechora basins and in Siberia. In some cases it was used only in the most critical lower crowns, in the construction of objects with a special load. Spruce was used in household and auxiliary buildings, for rafters, in the regions of the middle zone for the construction of residential and public constructions.

In the southern regions and the central zone, oak, whose wood is characterized by great strength, was used in the construction of important objects. Other deciduous trees were used to make specific elements of buildings, but they were almost never used as the main material. Branches, bark, stone, clay, etc., were also used. Birch bark has been used as a waterproofing material since ancient times.

=== Foundations ===
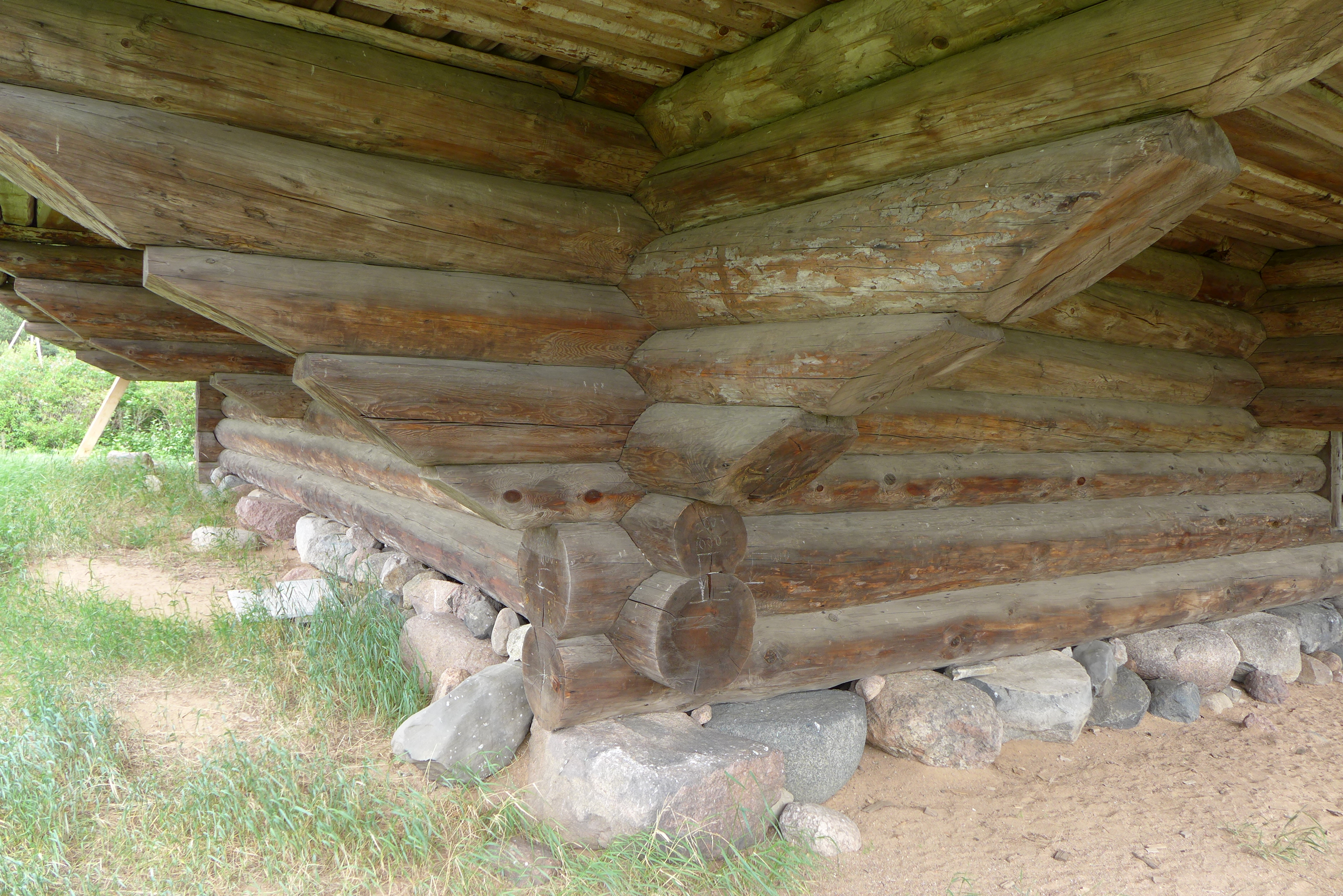
Boulder foundation with underfill

Sometimes the buildings had no foundations and were built directly on the ground or on the earth. In the case of izba dwellings, the fill was made not only under the walls, but also along them, which protected the bottom of the izba from freezing. The fill could be supported by a fence of logs or planks.

The old wooden foundations have hardly survived to our time. Pile foundations are vertical, buried or driven logs; they protected barns and sheds from rodents, and in wet areas they reliably protected buildings from water. Sometimes the corners of the log cabin rested on stumps. There were also log foundations (cut logs, laid horizontally), row foundations (several crowns, chopped in the cut), in swampy areas foundations in the form of a deck of two perpendicular rows of logs.

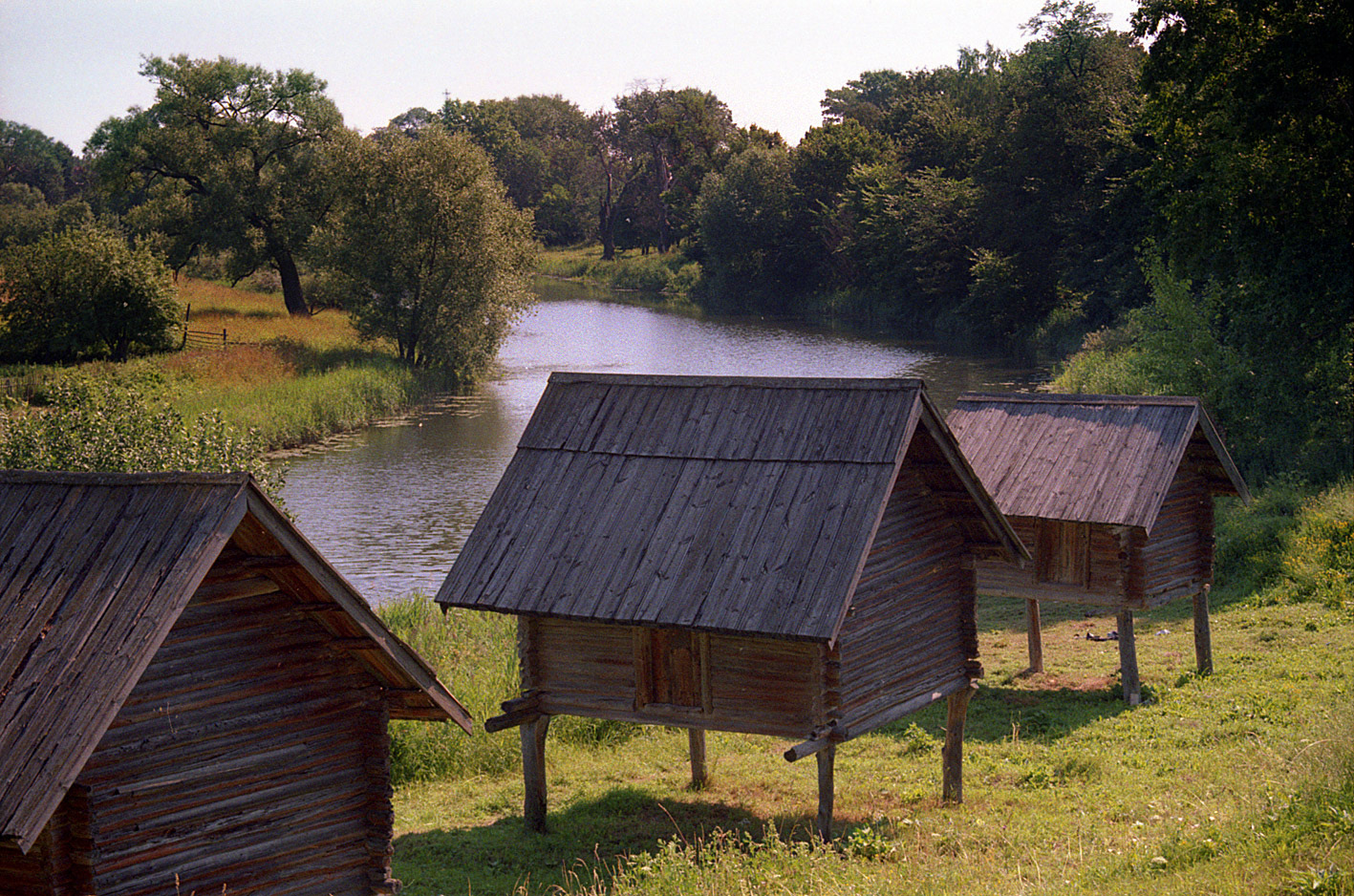
Barns on wooden piles

Among old buildings, the most common are boulder foundations: boulders placed under the corners of the log cabin, under the middle of the walls, and under the places where timbers were joined. The spaces under the walls between the boulders were sometimes filled with smaller stones. Chisel and brick strip and column foundations became widespread rather late, although according to archaeological data they were present in some buildings of the pre-Mongol period. Such foundations, which are present in many ancient churches, usually appeared as a result of later repairs. Brick socle foundations are characteristic of urban and manor wooden buildings of the 18th–19th centuries, as well as the houses of wealthy peasants of the 2nd half of the 19th century.

=== Walls ===
==== Log walls ====
The basis of Russian wooden architecture is a wall construction system — a log house. It is a structure formed by horizontally stacked logs, tied together at the corners, and along the logs there is usually a groove chosen. Tongue and groove joints and countersunk studs were sometimes used for greater strength. Warm and cold log cabins have their own joinery characteristics. Warm log cabins use interlocking sealant, which can be made of moss, straw, or sawdust.

The rows of logs joined at the corners are called crowns. The horizontal laying of logs provides the strength of the walls, which allows to build structures of considerable height, up to 45 m and even higher, up to 75m. Increasing the horizontal dimensions of the structure is difficult because of the limited length of the logs. Architects solved this problem by lashing one log house to the wall of another or by placing two log houses close to each other. Joining logs lengthwise was rarely used and only in engineering structures. Octagonal shapes have been used to create spacious rooms with large areas. They have good tilt resistance. Six- and ten-sided log cabins are rare. Log cabins of non-standard shapes found application in cult and defense architecture. The curvilinear extensions of the log cabin, which contribute to the drainage of water from the walls, are called povalami. The difference between Russian buildings and Western European ones is the absence of rhythmic division of walls by a system of pilasters and cornices. Only in the late period did Russian buildings begin to acquire undercurtains reminiscent of Western European cornices.

In Siberia it was possible to meet izba dwellings, cut from 5–6 crowns, diameter of timbers fluctuated within 200–500 mm, and the length could reach 16m.

А. Y. Kosenkov distinguishes five classes of log houses, including logs with full and partial dressing of horizontal joints, as well as logs with and without gaps. Grooving could be upper, lower or double grooving. Top grooving was widespread in antiquity, but since the 15th–16th centuries they moved to bottom grooving.

Corner joints can be divided into three groups: with residue, without residue, and hybrid. Residual cutting methods protect the corners from freezing and give strength to the building. Cut-to-length methods are less reliable and freeze harder.

Log walls

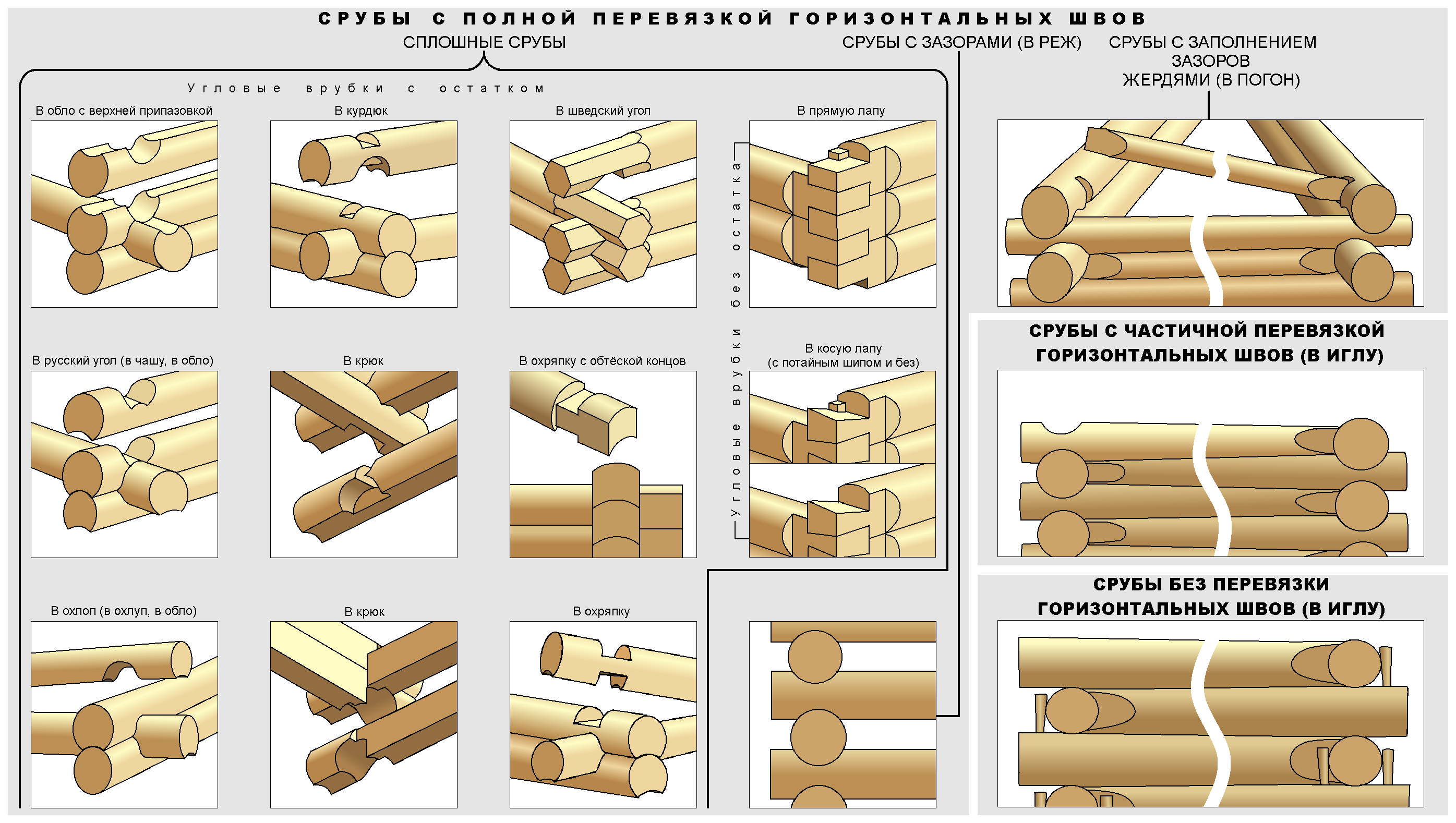
Russian cabin log constructions

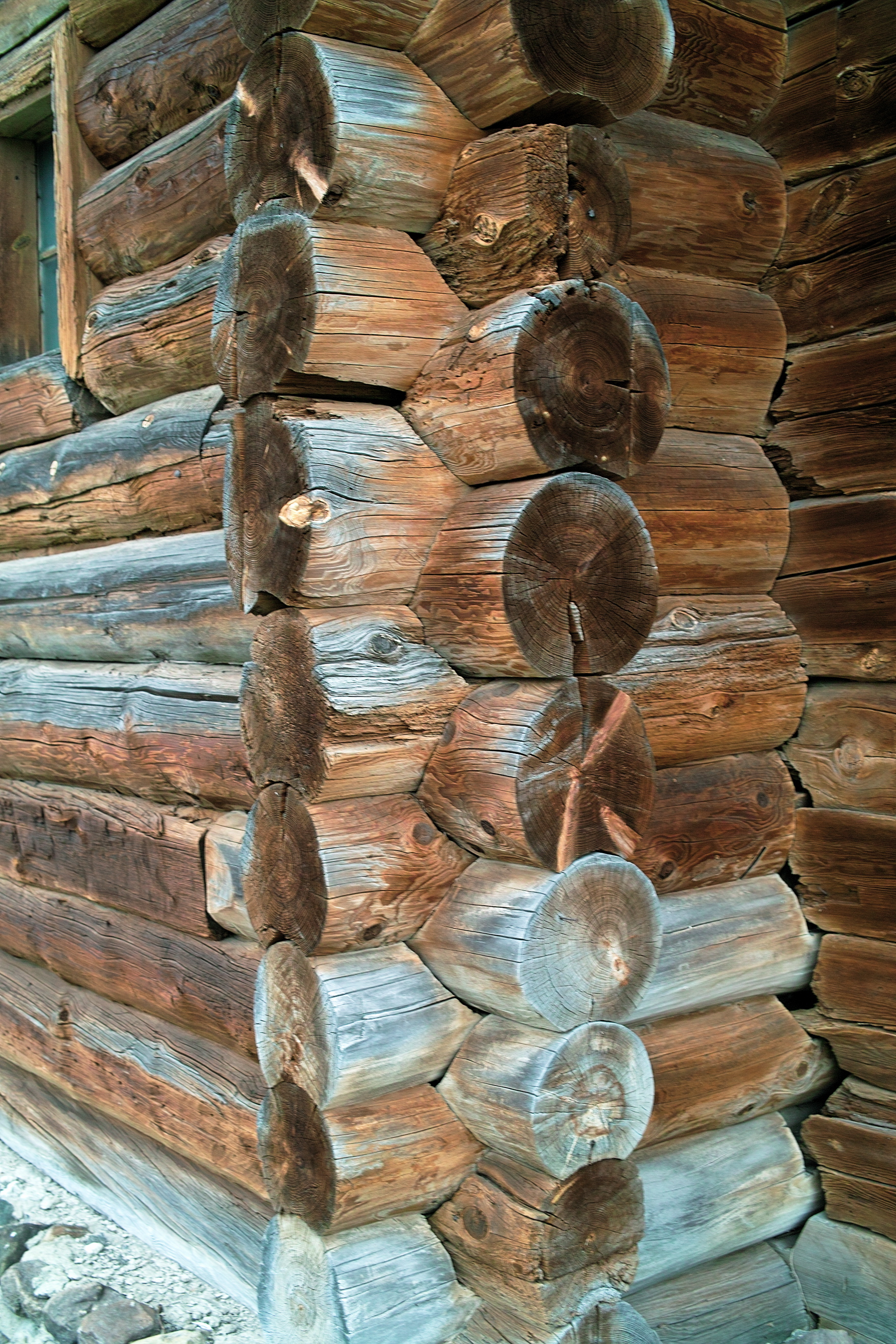
Cabin log constructions with residues

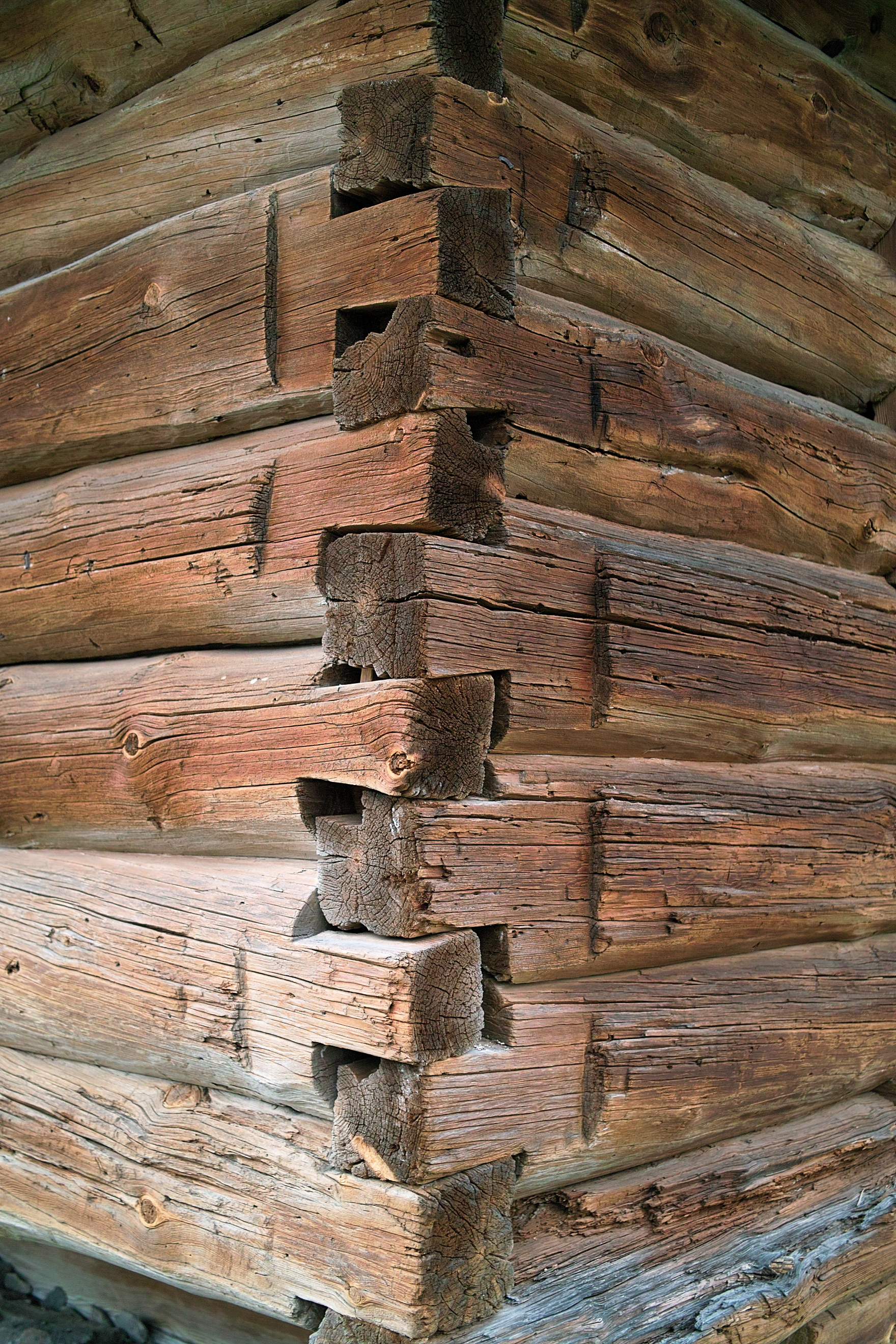
Cabin log constructions without residues

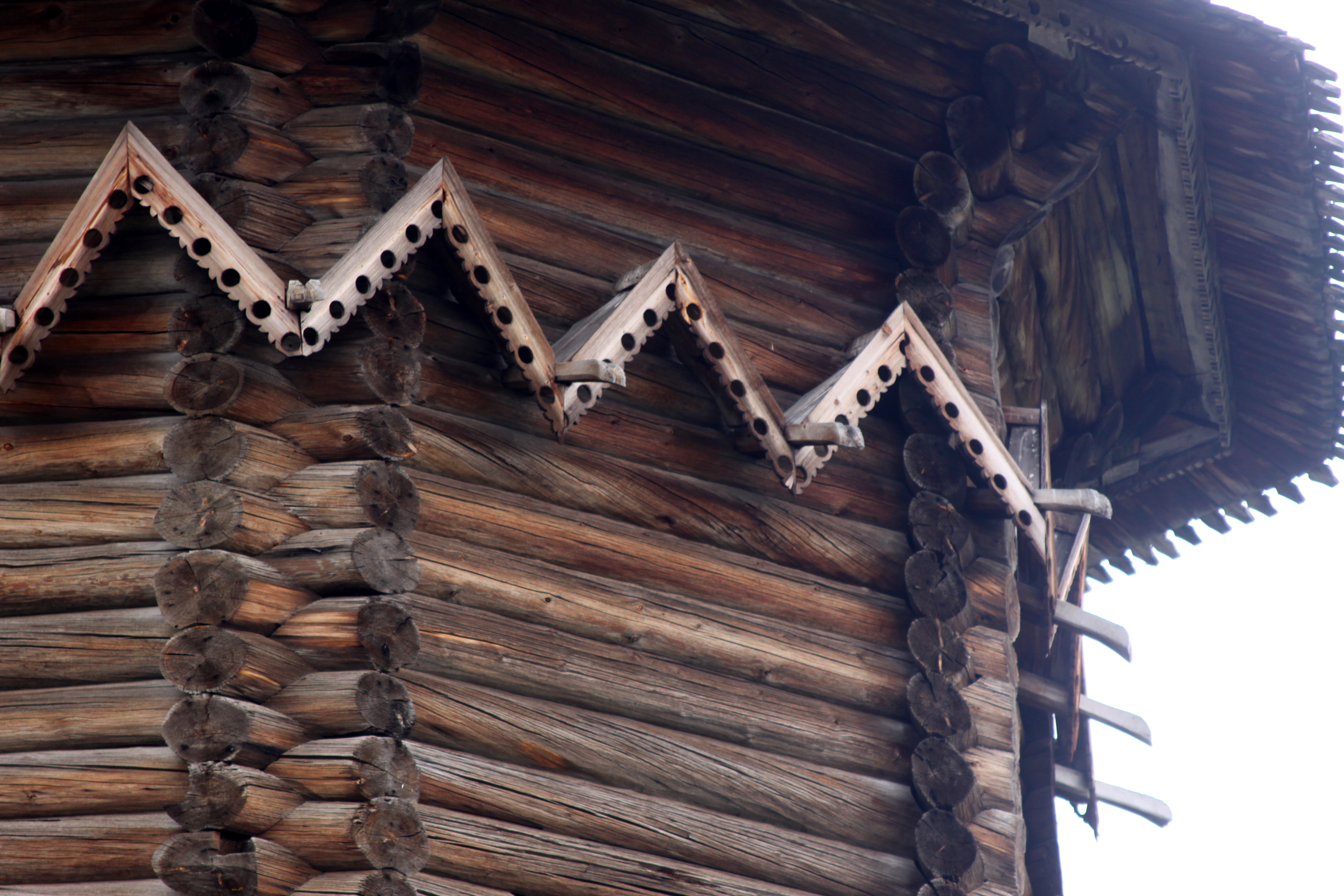
Stump and gable belt

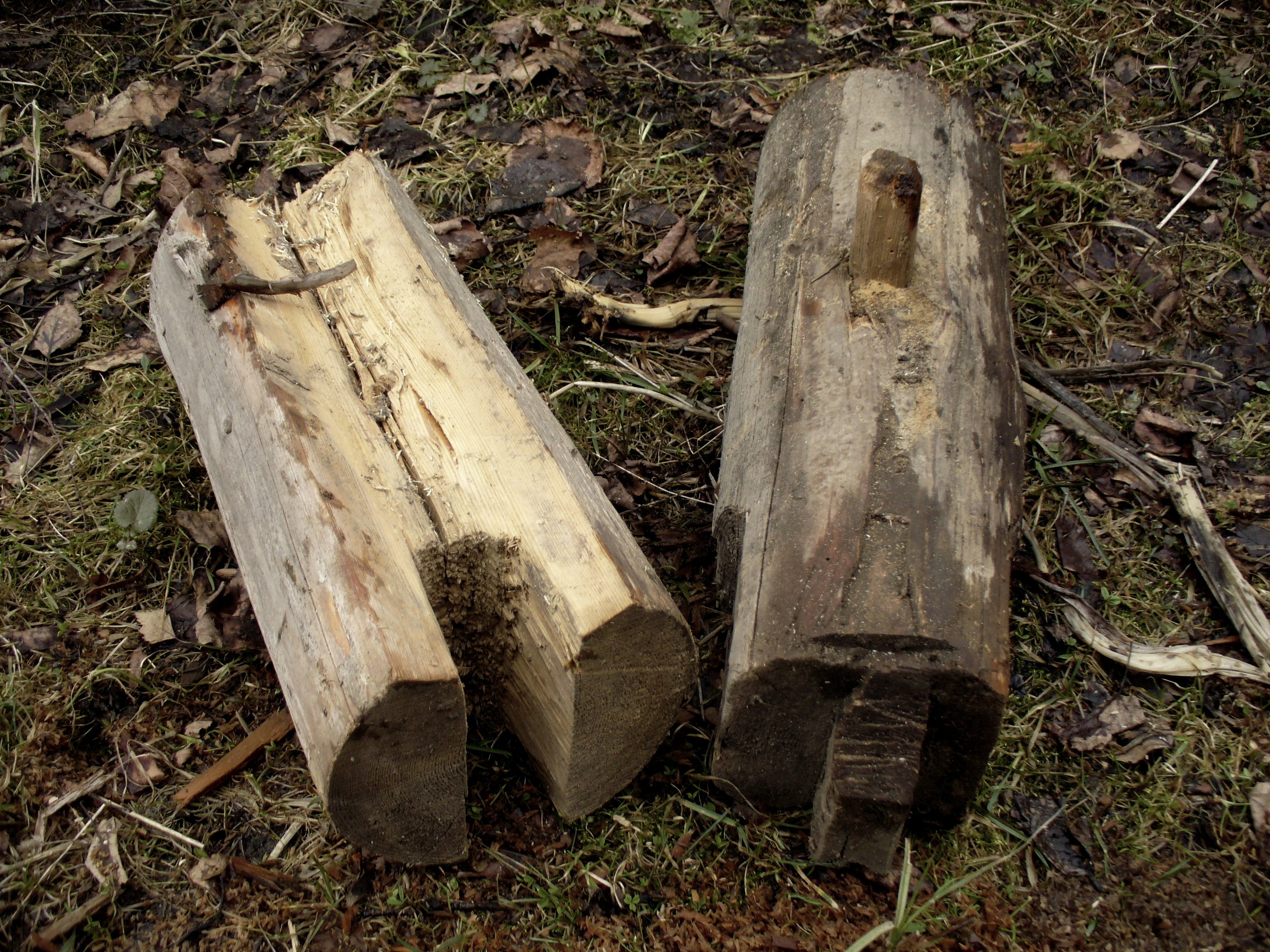
The logs' joint point

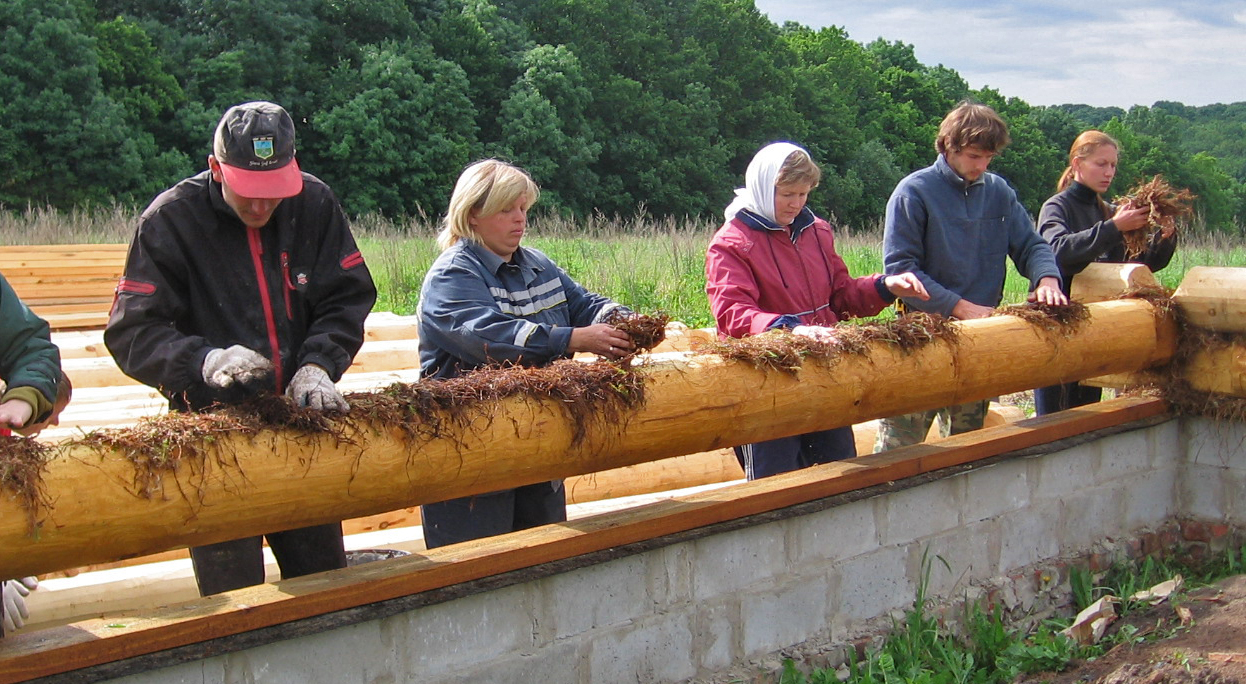
Moss laying

==== Framed and framed column walls ====
In Russian architecture, only the bell towers were considered to be fully wooden framing constructions. Auxiliary buildings, galleries, verandas, upper summer residences of choirs had a frame construction system. A characteristic feature of Russian frame walls was the absence of bracing. Stability was achieved mainly by careful fitting of elements in joints and nailing. The space between the posts of light frame walls was filled with boards, either straight or in a jamb. Some open galleries and passages had handrails and balustrades.

The frame column, or simple column construction, consists of wooden columns dug into the ground at some distance, with the space between them filled with wicker, wood, horizontally laid boards, or timbers. The logs were usually pointed at the ends and driven into the vertical groove of the post (cutting into the zabir or into the post). Examples of the use of such construction are fences (zaplotnaya fence), walls of some household buildings. There are known examples of walls combining nodes of frame-post construction and ordinary log construction (log-post walls).

==== Walls with vertical logs ====
The logs dug vertically into the ground and sharpened from above to form a continuous wall are called palisade. Such a construction was used for fences and walls of defensive constructions. According to the monuments of the 18th–19th centuries, the construction of vertically placed logs connected at the top and bottom by horizontal straps is known.

=== Slabs, floors and ceilings ===
Wooden buildings have traditionally used beam ceilings, depending on the time and purpose:

- Simple slabs: Joists or beams cut into the walls with logs laid on top of them. The humps of the logs were sheared off for ease of walking. A smoother floor was created using planks laid round side down, which is characteristic of the 17th–18th centuries.
- 19th century: Floors made of sawn planks, which were inserted into the grooves of wall timbers or guide beams and connected with spikes. In rich huts, for insulation, timbers were rolled onto the lags, covered with earth, then new lags and boardwalks were laid.
- Classicism: In this period, parquet floors were used. Ceilings could be plastered over shingles or wallpapered.
- Utility and ancient huts: Floors were often earthen or made from compacted earth, especially in the south.
- Attic ceilings: The most archaic ones included a beam-matrix cut into the walls with a log heave. From the 18th–19th centuries, they began to use laths laid round side up or thick planks laid overlapping. In rich houses, ceilings were lined with boards nailed to the matitsa.
- Churches of the 17th century: Frequent beams and boards laid at an angle, creating a herringbone pattern, were used. Large naos sometimes had suspended ceilings, the ceiling of which often had a rise to the center and was painted.
- Attic floor backfill: Attic floors may have been filled with earth or covered with clay and straw for additional insulation.
Floors and ceilings

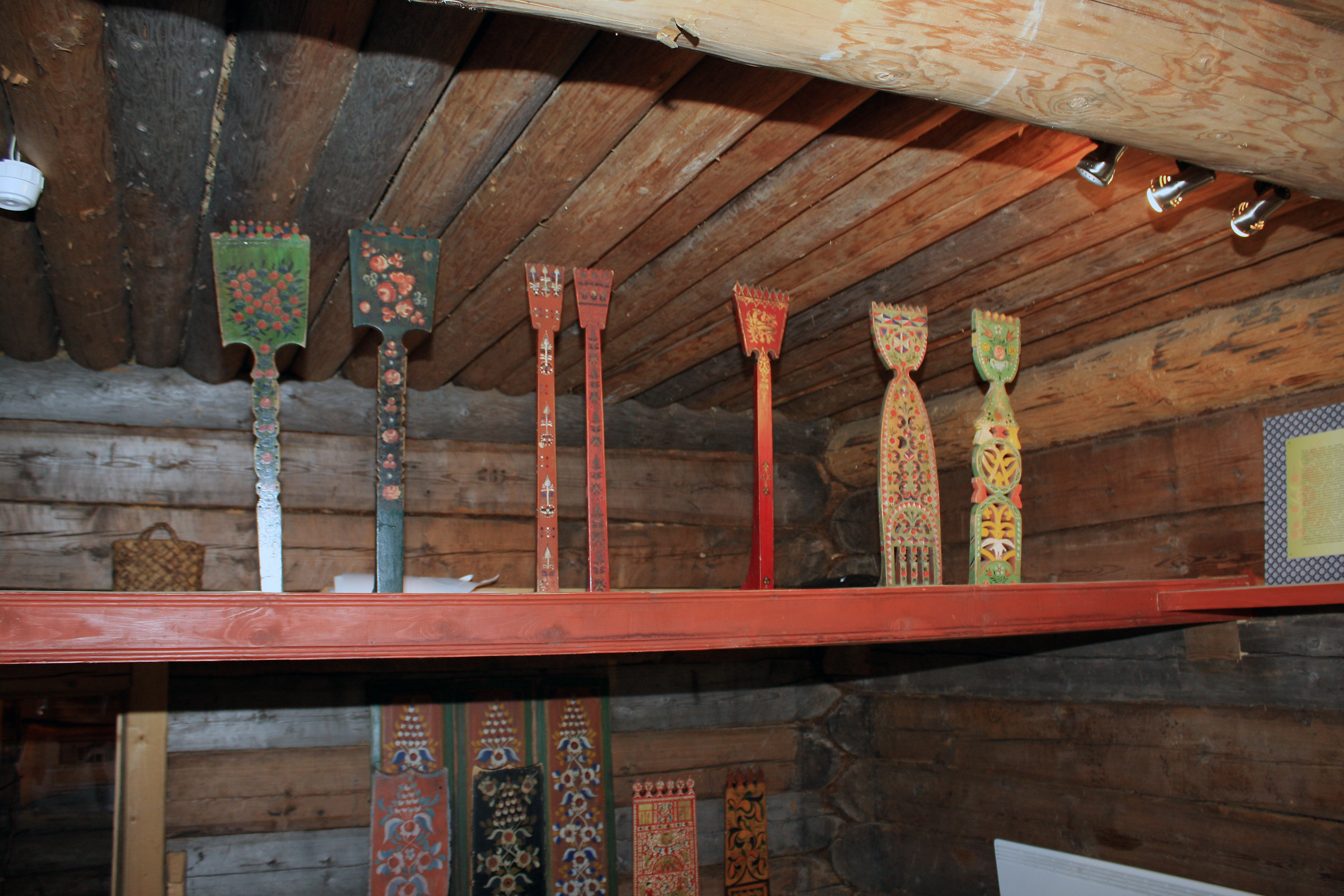
Log roll ceiling in izba-dwelling

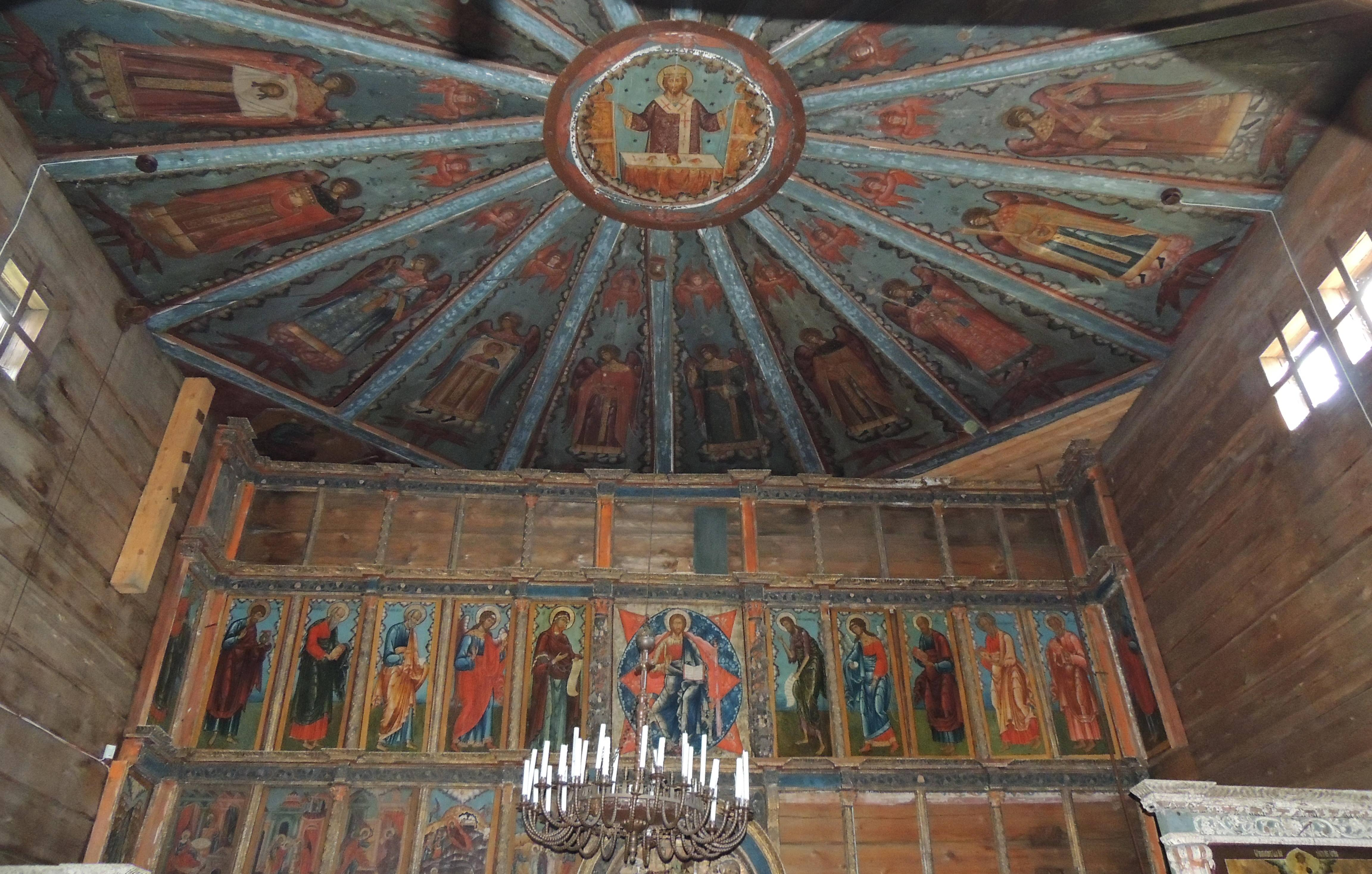
The sky-shaped ceiling in naos

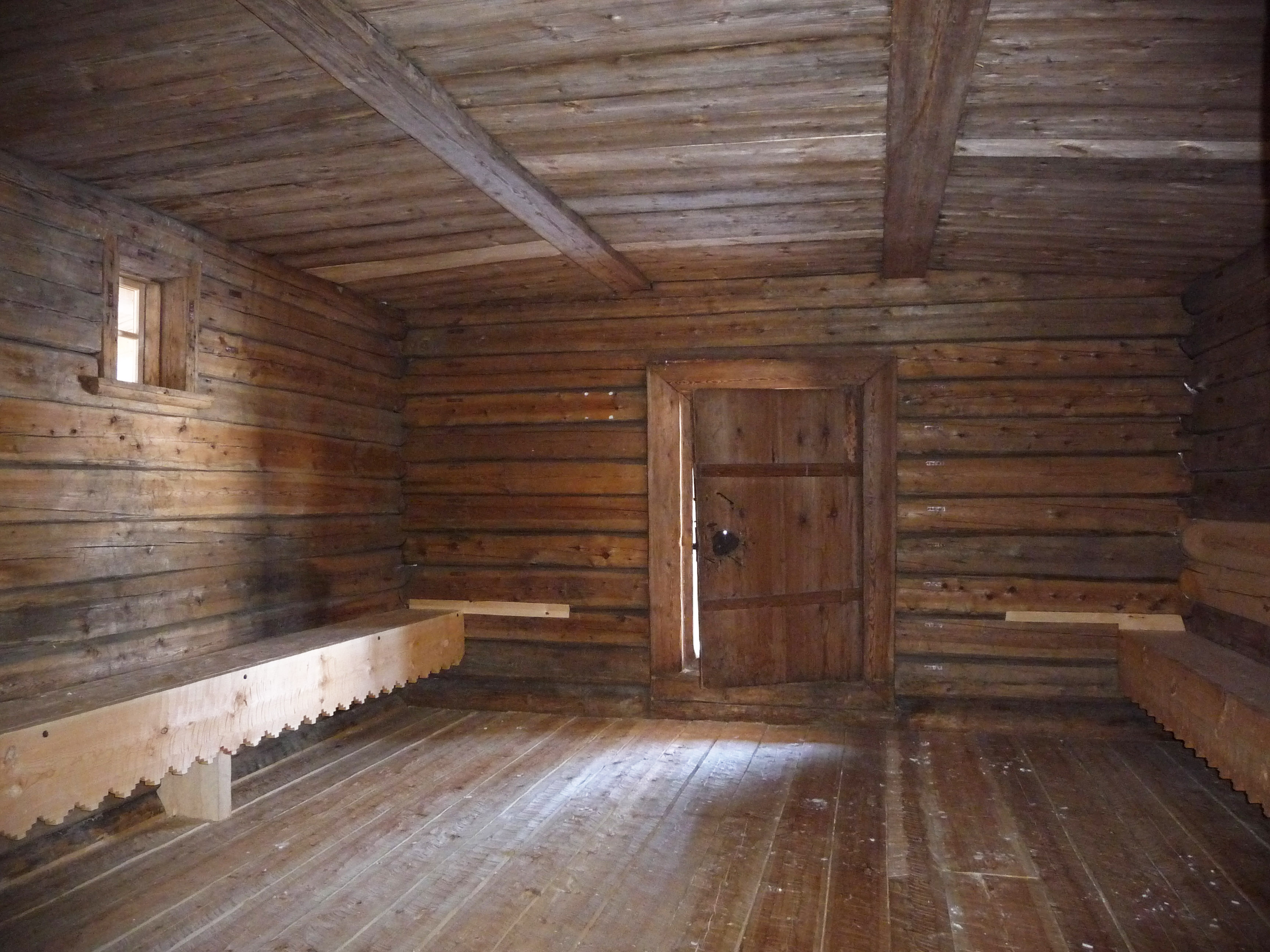
Blistered boardwalk ceiling and boardwalk floor in the refectory

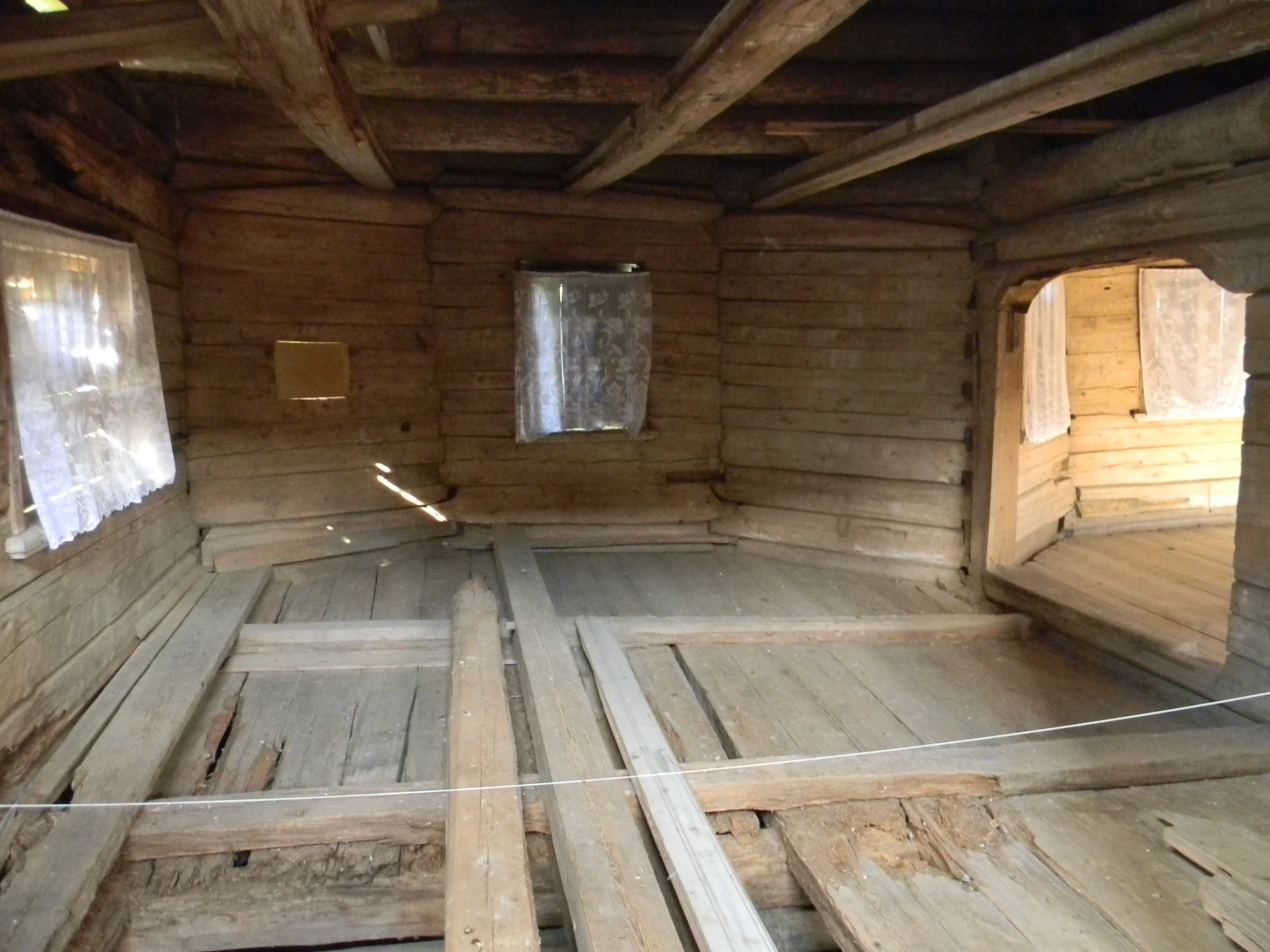
Ceiling and floor repair

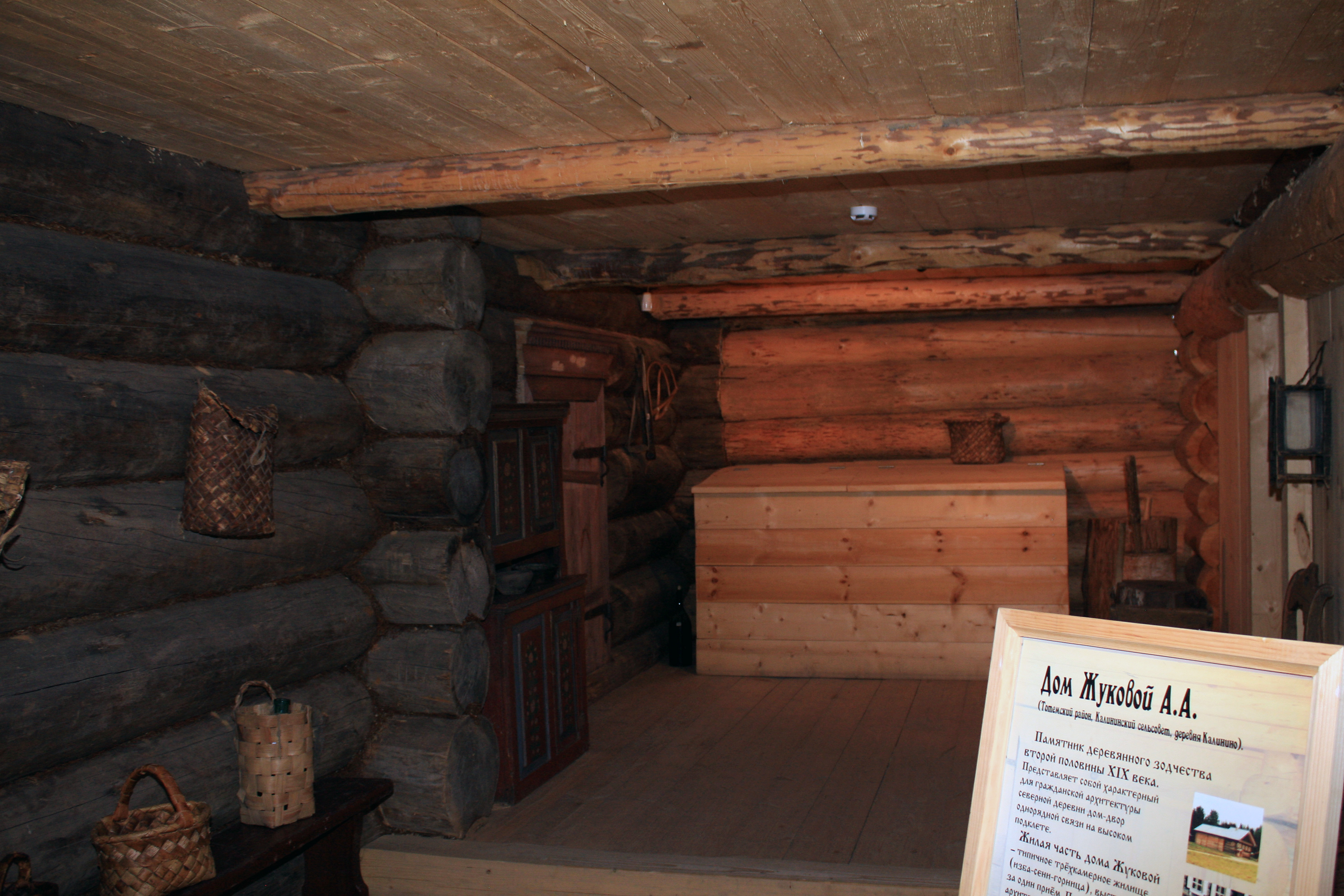
Boardwalk ceiling and floor in izba-dwelling

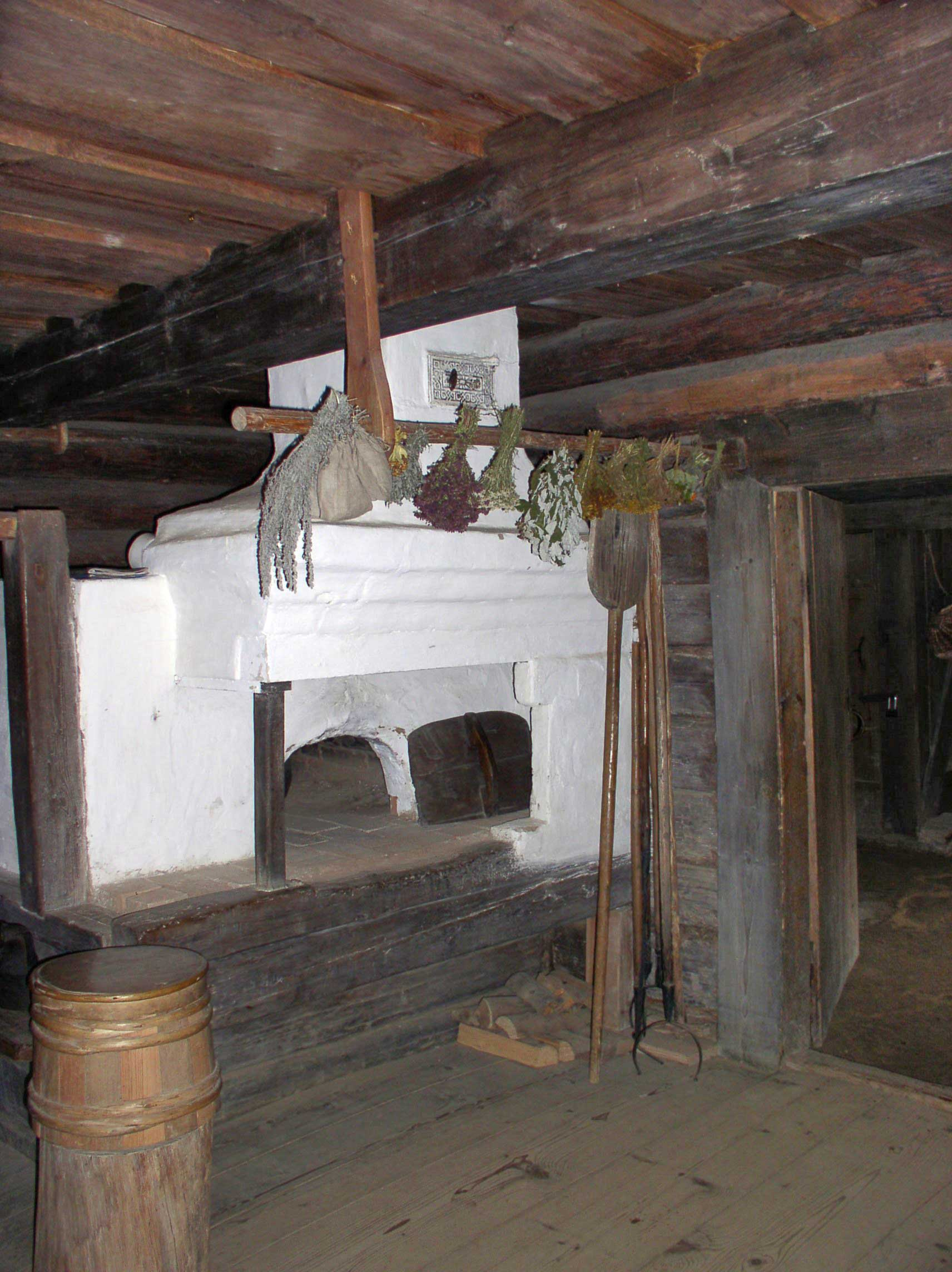
Overlap board ceiling and board floor in izba-dwelling

=== Windows ===
The simplest and oldest type of window is a casement window, which takes the form of a horizontally elongated rectangular slit without any additional treatment. Its height is usually equal to the height of a log. This kind of window was “covered” from the inside with a board bolt. A slanting or red window referred to a window cut through to the height of several logs. The ends of the timbers were fixed with post-jambs. To let light into the windows, a metal frame was inserted and covered with bull's bladder, oiled canvas, or a film made from animal peritoneum. In richer houses and large churches, mica was used. In the 17th and 18th centuries, three-jamb windows without a lower lintel became widespread. In outbuildings and undercrofts, drag windows were still in use in the 20th century. By the beginning of the 19th century, they had disappeared in huts, finally giving way to slanting windows. The lightening of the deck and the resulting gaps between it and the walls led to the need to cover these spaces with platbands. The first platbands were simple, smooth linings, but over time, they began to be carved. Carved platbands entered mass peasant construction in the 18th century under the influence of city architecture. Sometimes, windows also had shutters. In the 19th century, the design of slanted windows evolved towards greater rationalization and lightening of the construction. A sill board appeared, and the deck became an ordinary window frame filled with glass. The window aperture itself became larger and took the form of a vertically elongated rectangle. The frames in village houses were either liftable, sliding, or fixed. By the beginning of the 20th century, swing windows with frames on metal hinges came into widespread use.

Windows

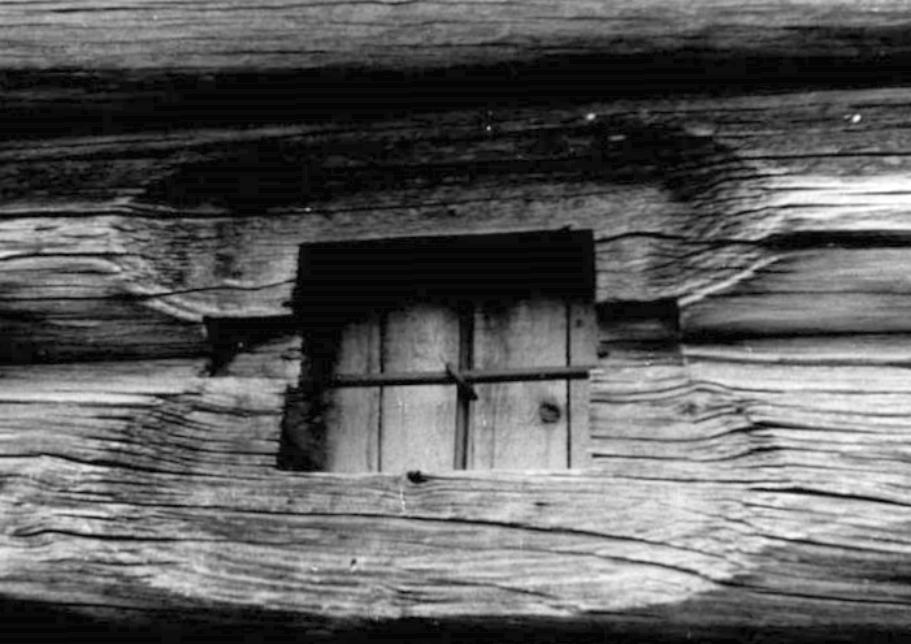
Casement window

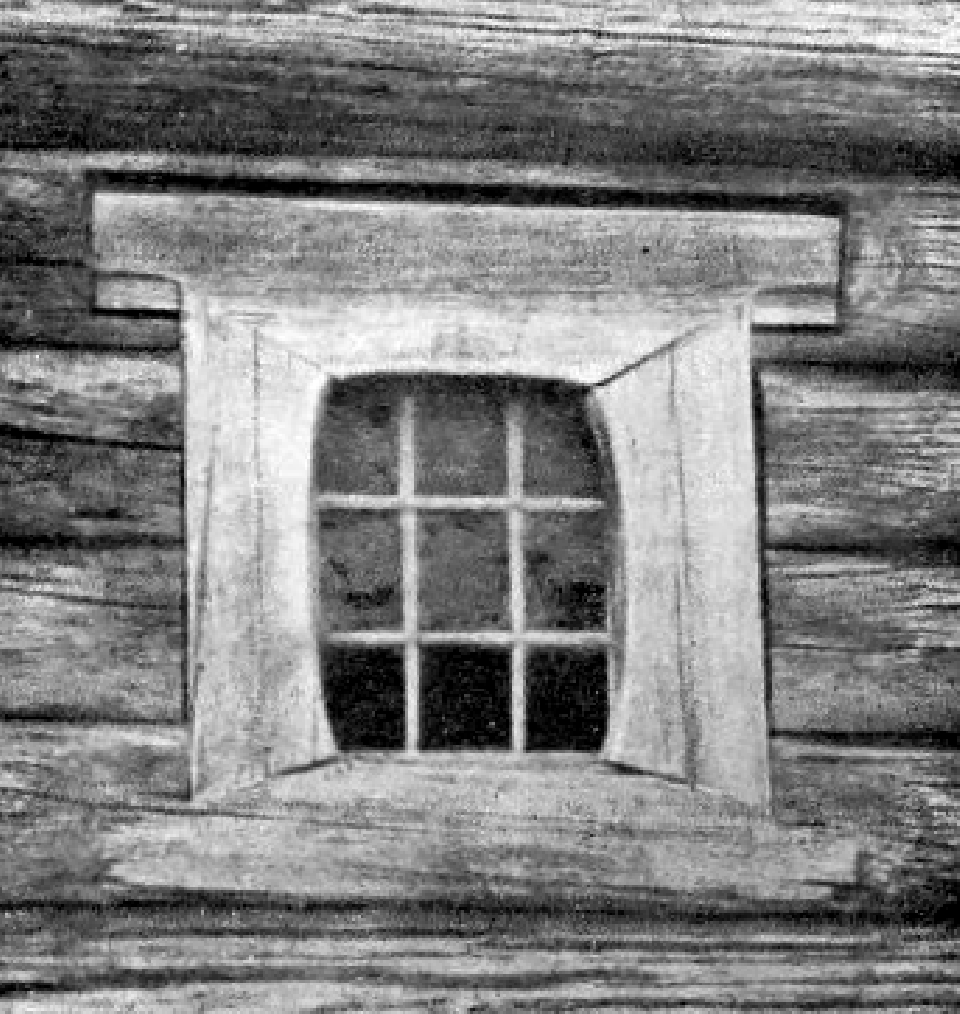
Three-paned window with shoulders and rounded corners, 17th century

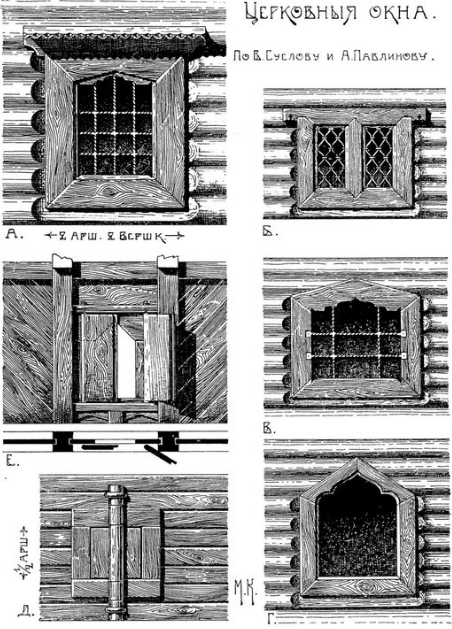
Church windows

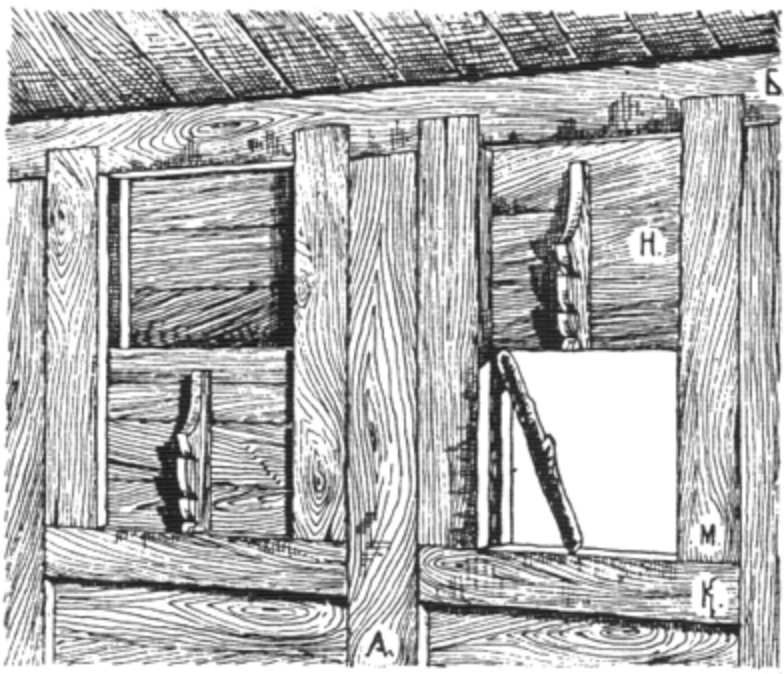
Parvise window

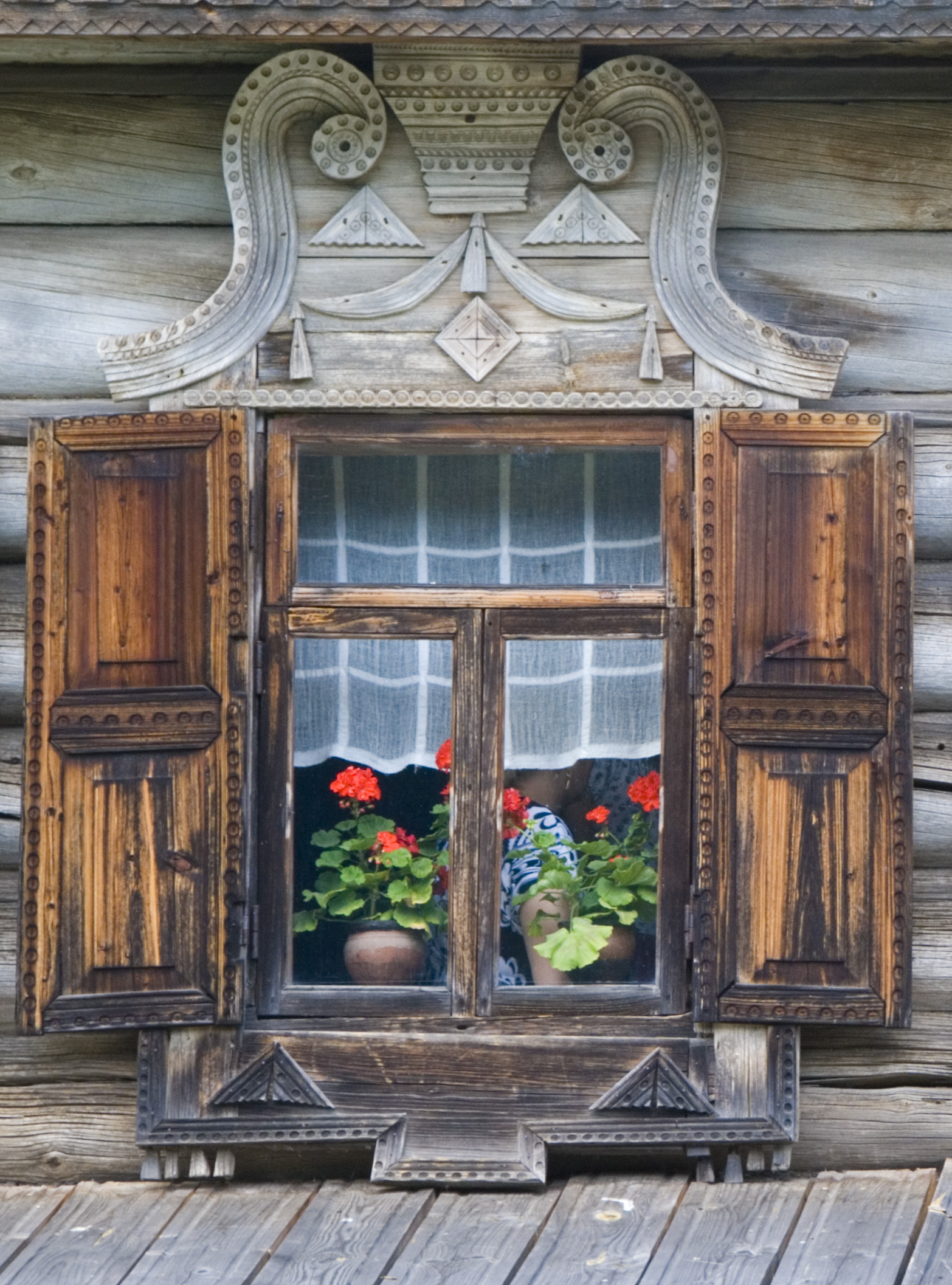
Window with shutters and carved volute platband, late 19th century

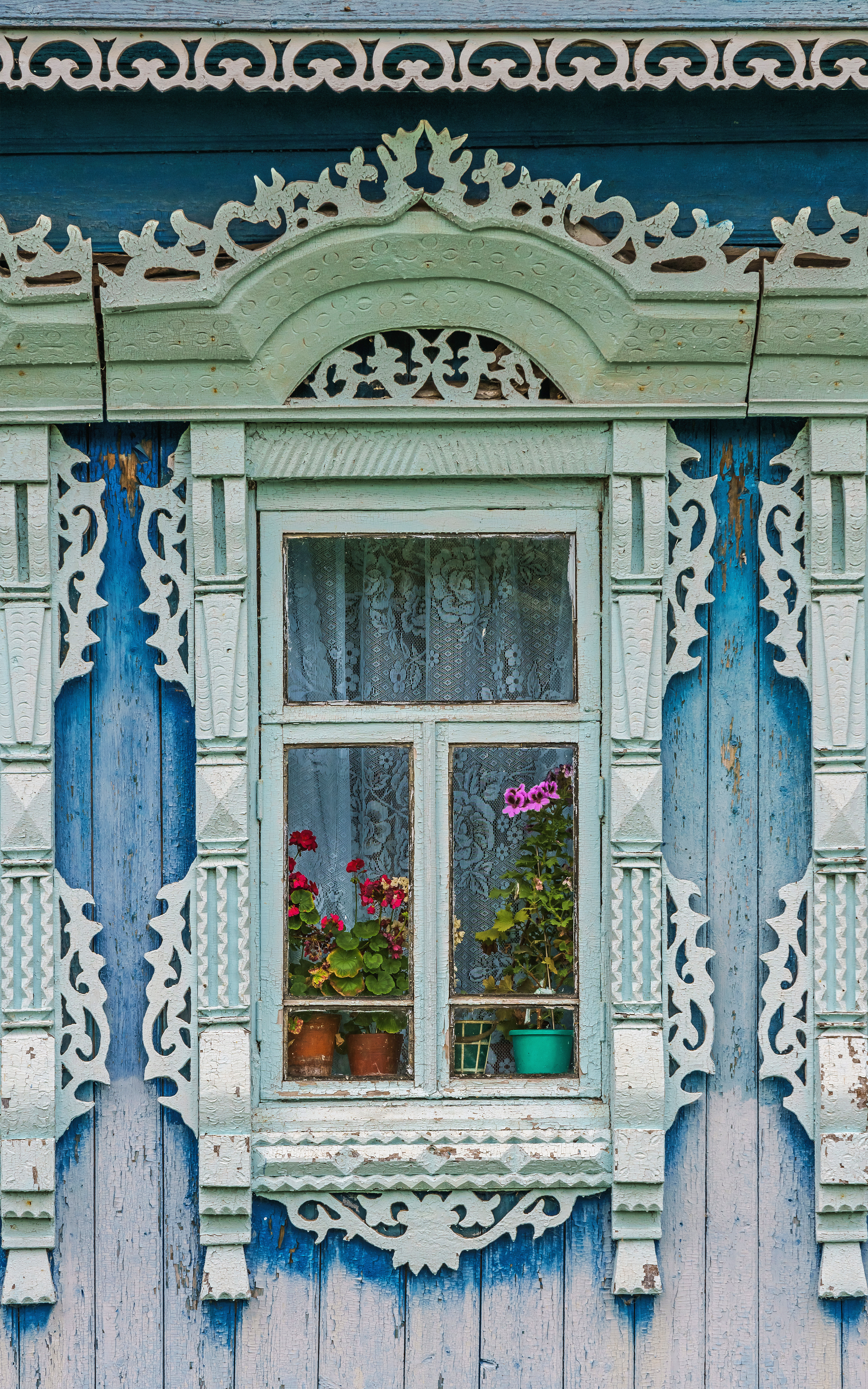
Window with carved platband of the eclectic period. Early 20th century

=== Doors ===
In general, the construction of a traditional door frame is similar to that of a window deck. Doors were less influenced by foreign elements than windows and were rarely accompanied by rich decoration. However, carved portals in arched or near-arched forms can sometimes be found in churches, and many doors in churches and wealthy houses were decorated with wrought iron hinges (beetles) and paintings. Despite this, such decorations were not commonly used. A. I. Nekrasov noted the high threshold as one of the main features of Russian doors. While in Western European architecture, the floors of rooms form a single plane, creating a sense of open, merged spaces, the high threshold in old Russian buildings prevents this, causing the individual parts of the building to be perceived as closed, static volumes. In most of the surviving monuments, the door leaves are made of several vertical boards and are hinged with metal. Doors of traditional peasant dwellings are typically single-leaf, while double-leaf doors are associated with the influence of urban architecture.

Doors and gates

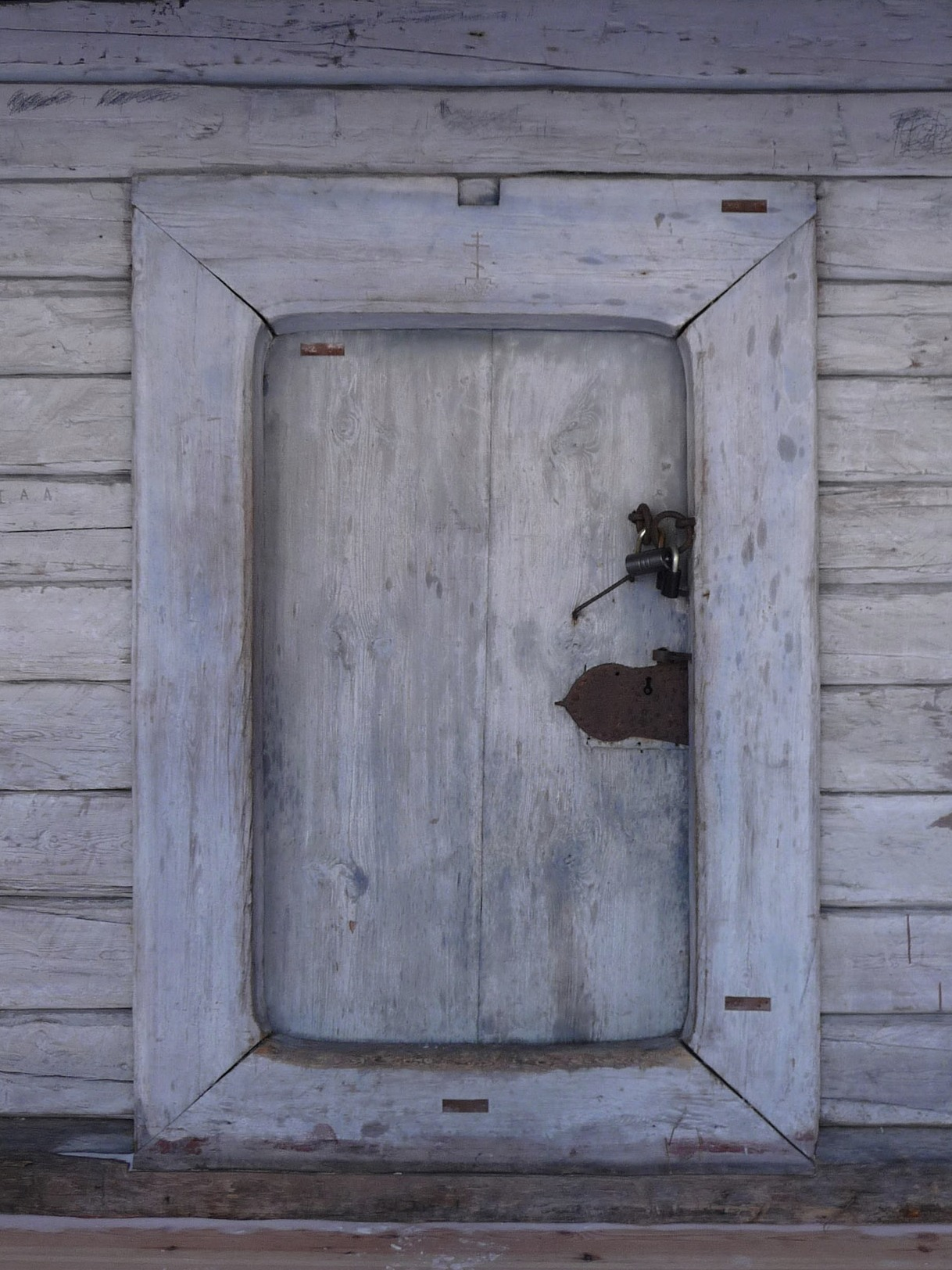
Church door with a four-jamb frame, 15th century

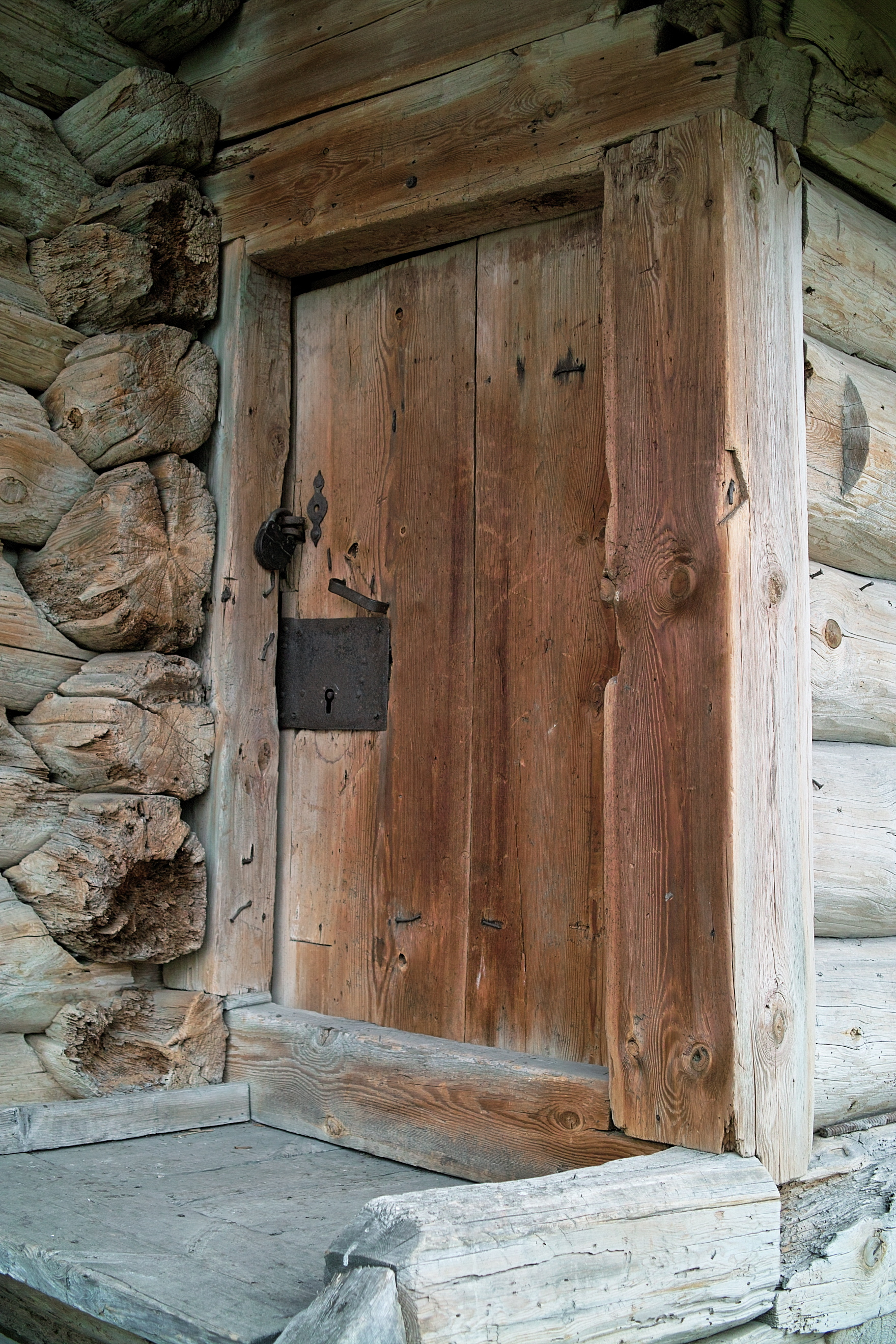
Church door, 17th century

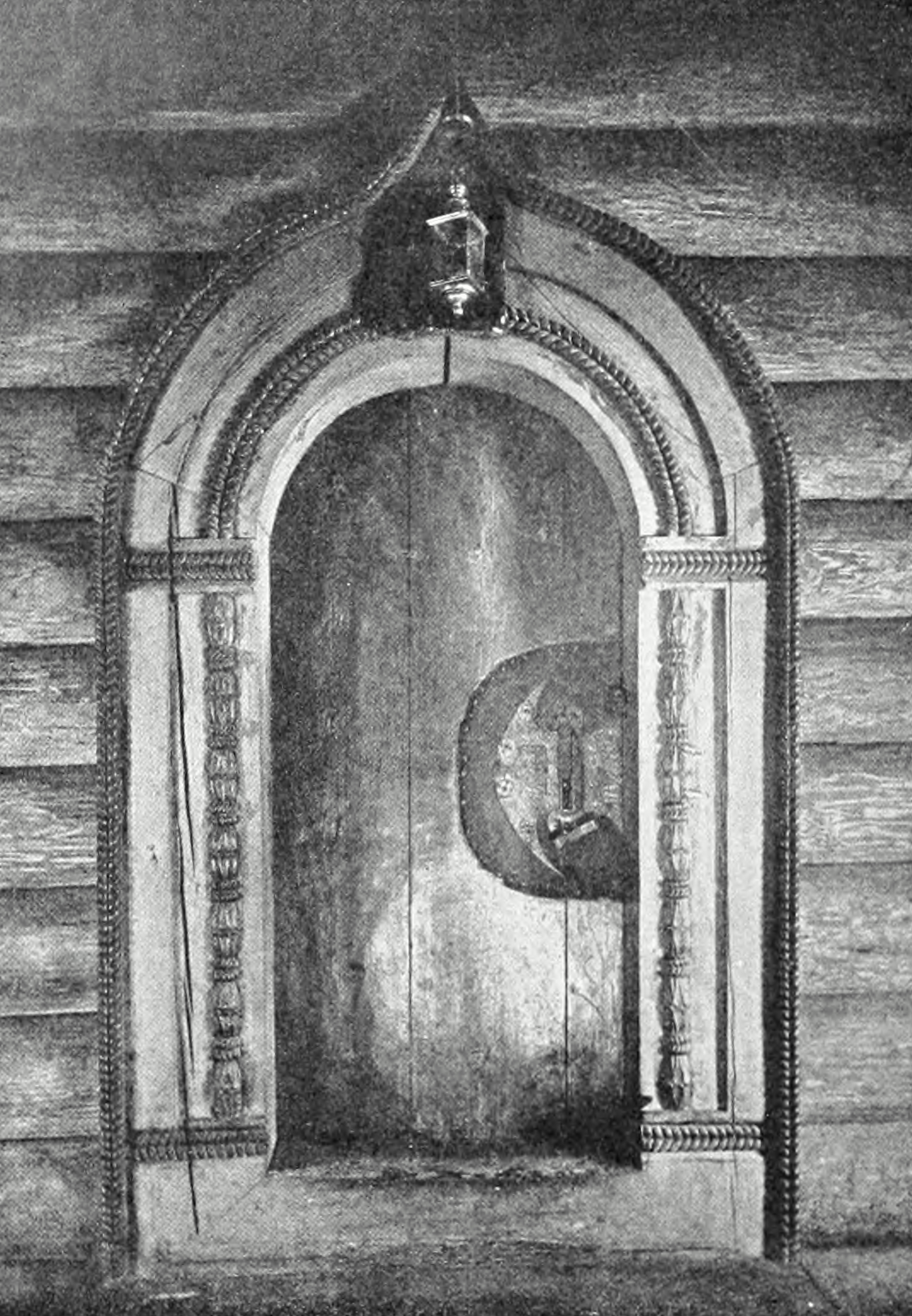
Arched church door. The 17th century.

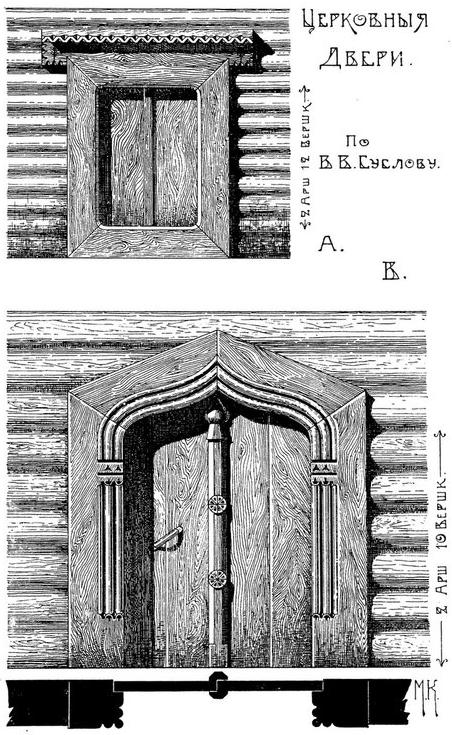
Church doors

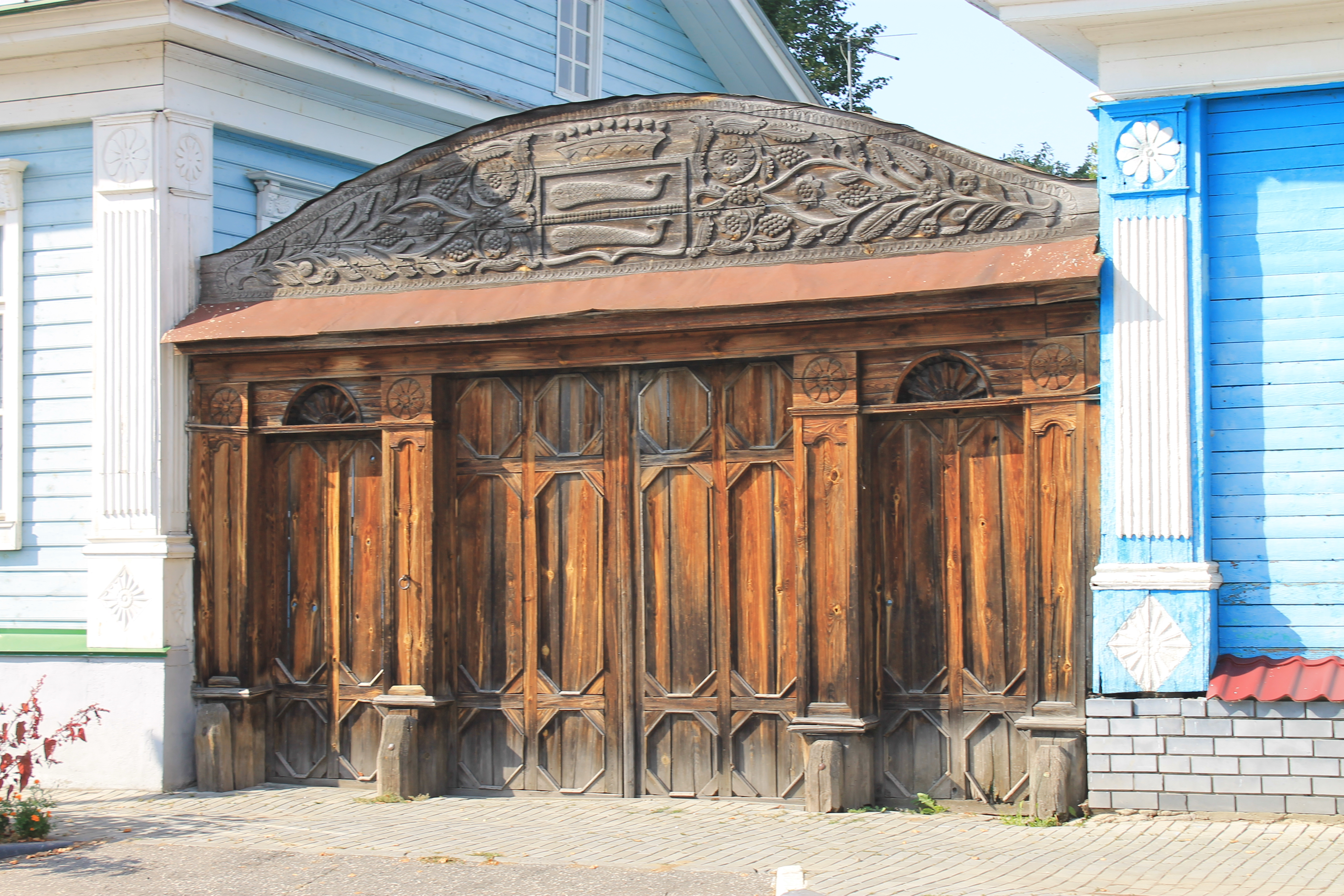
Doors and gates of a city manor, 19th century

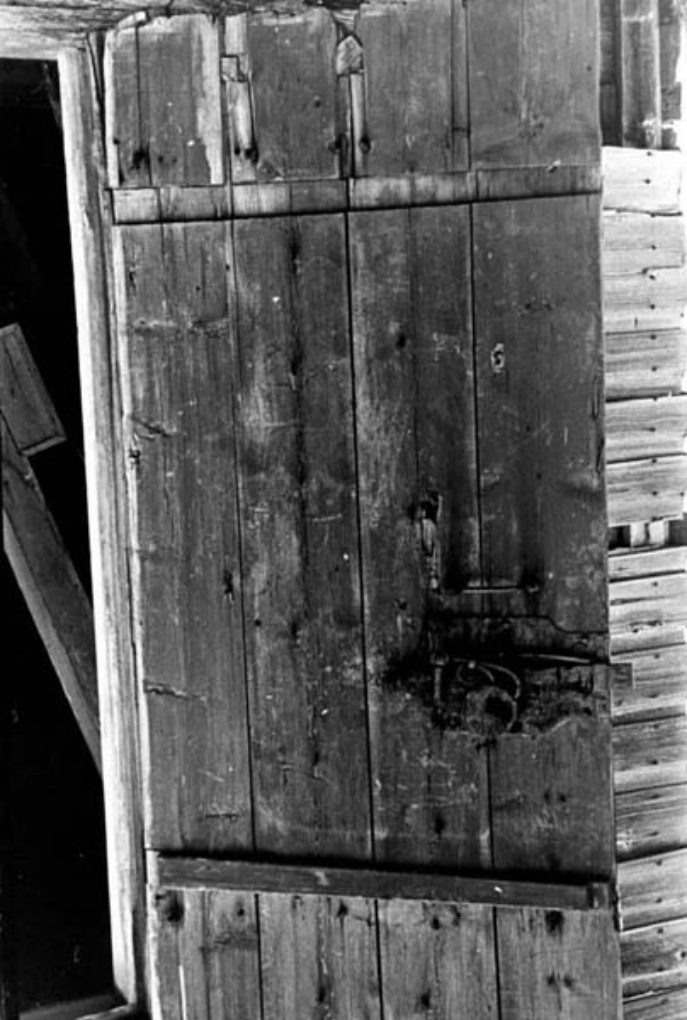
The inner side of the door with dowels, the end of the 19th century

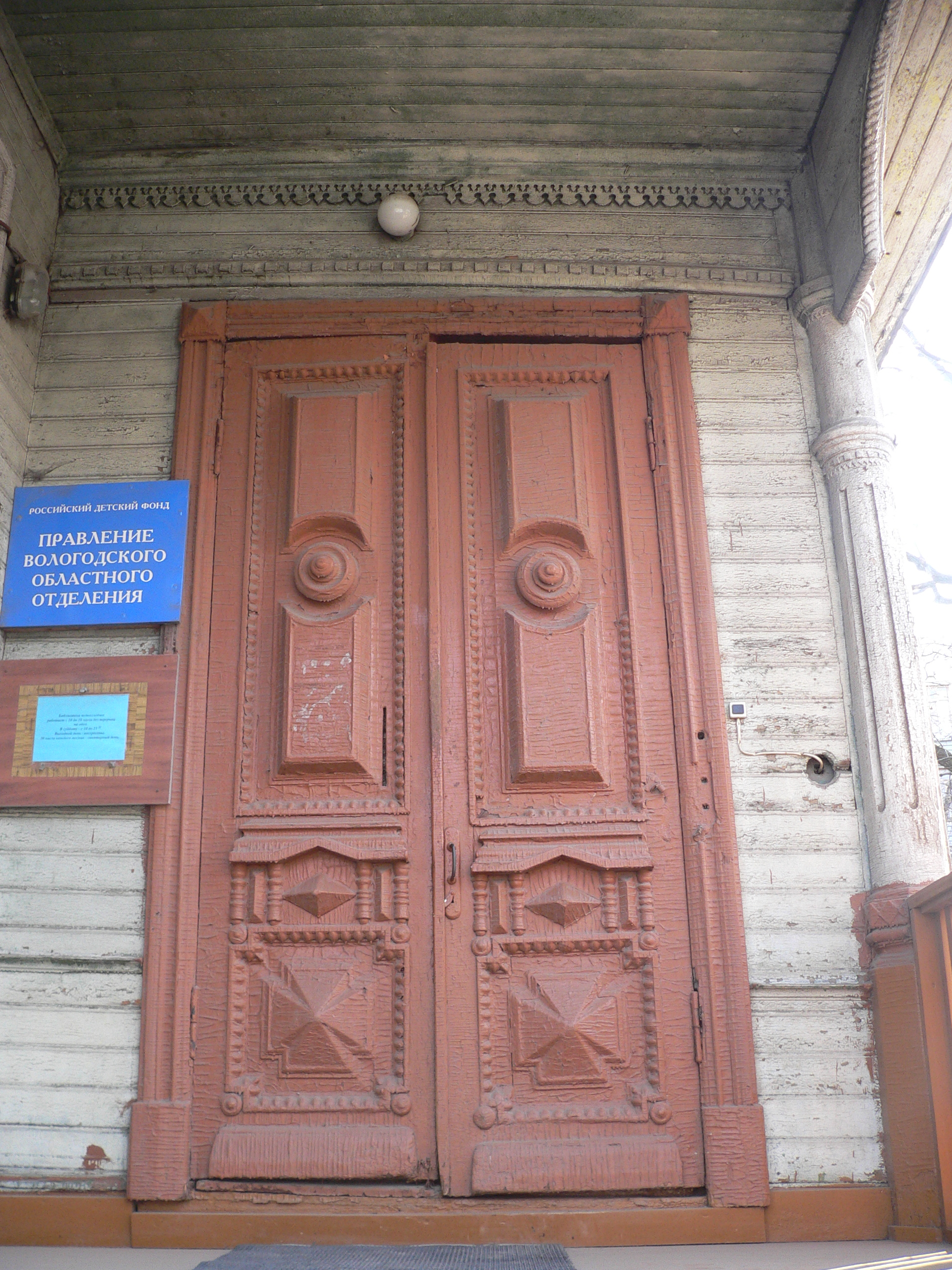
A door of an Eclectic mansion, early 20th century

=== Coverings and roofs ===
Russian wooden architecture is characterized by a great variety of roofs and coverings, which are classified by shape, structural and compositional solutions, as well as by the type of roofing. The main forms are pitched and curvilinear roofs. Pitched roofs are ubiquitous and come in single-pitch, double-pitch, four-pitch, and eight-pitch forms. Single-pitch roofs were used primarily for small outbuildings, while double-pitch roofs were most popular for dwellings. In cult architecture, broken roofs (politzes) were often used, providing large overhangs and architectural expression.

Structural designs include nailless and nailed systems. Nailless roofing systems were often constructed with timbers and concealed joints, reflecting ancient building traditions. In the 19th century, with the spread of nails, roofs began to be assembled on nail joints, which simplified their construction.

Roof types ranged from traditional wooden tiles and shingles to thatched and iron roofs, which became popular in the 19th century. Thatched roofs were characteristic of the southern regions, but gradually penetrated the north.

Curved roof forms, such as barrel and cuboid roofs, were used primarily in religious buildings and wealthy homes. These roofs had decorative elements and elaborate frame structures, often decorated with carvings and plowshares. One of the most expressive forms of roofs in Russian architecture were tented roofs, which could reach a height of up to 60 feet (18 m) and were often crowned with onion-shaped domes, topped with crosses.

Coverings and roofs

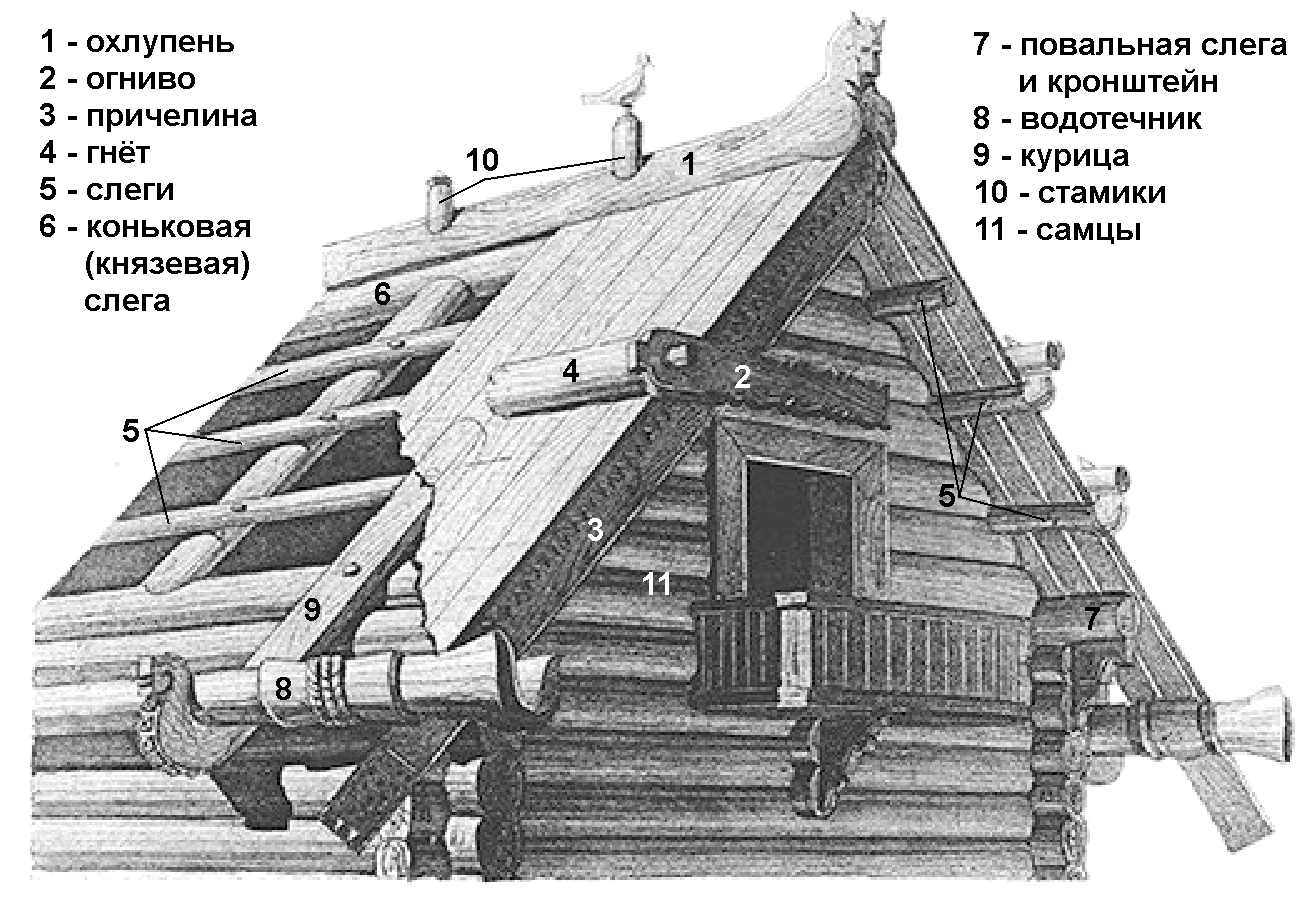
Nailless roof

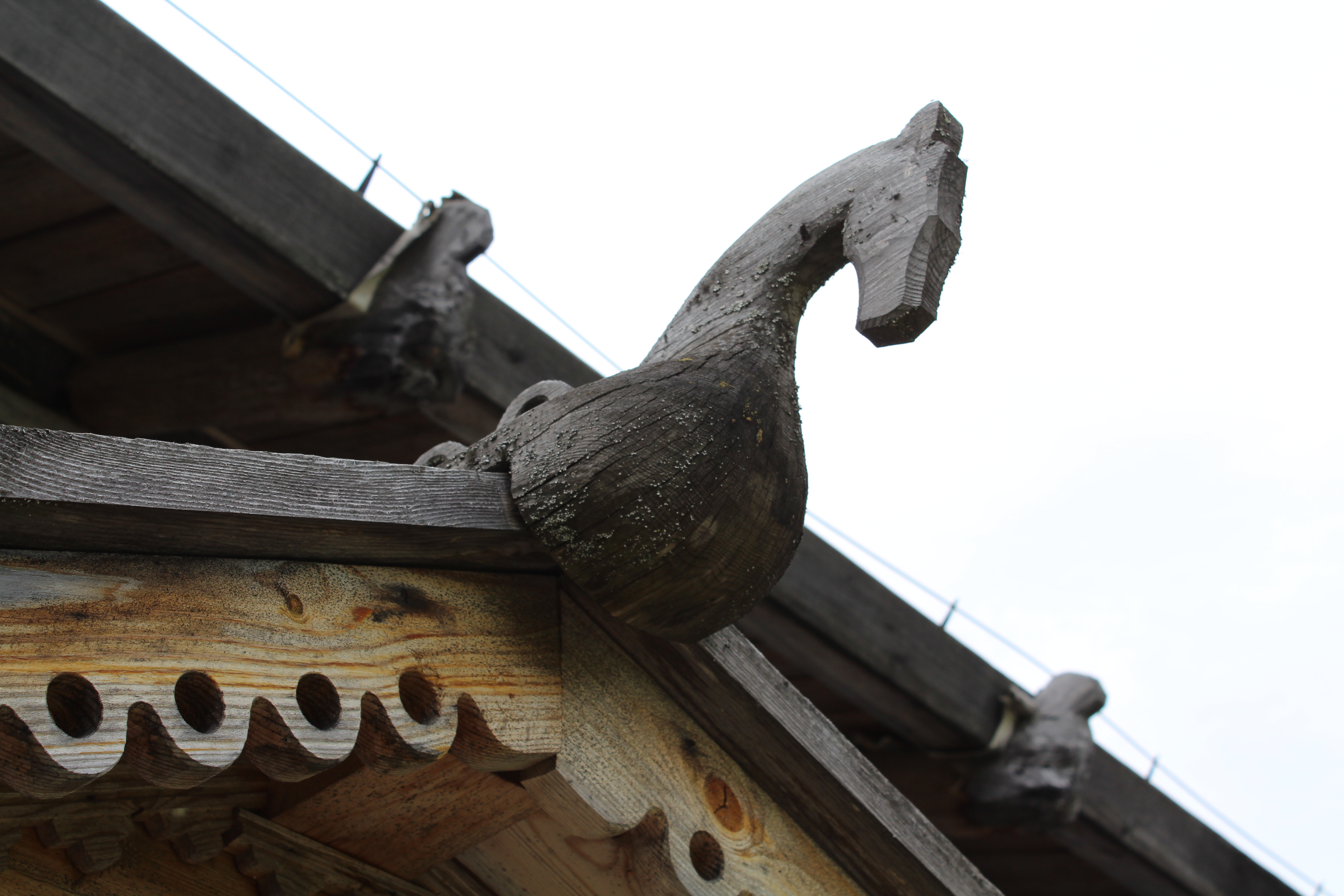
Horse's head as a decorative element

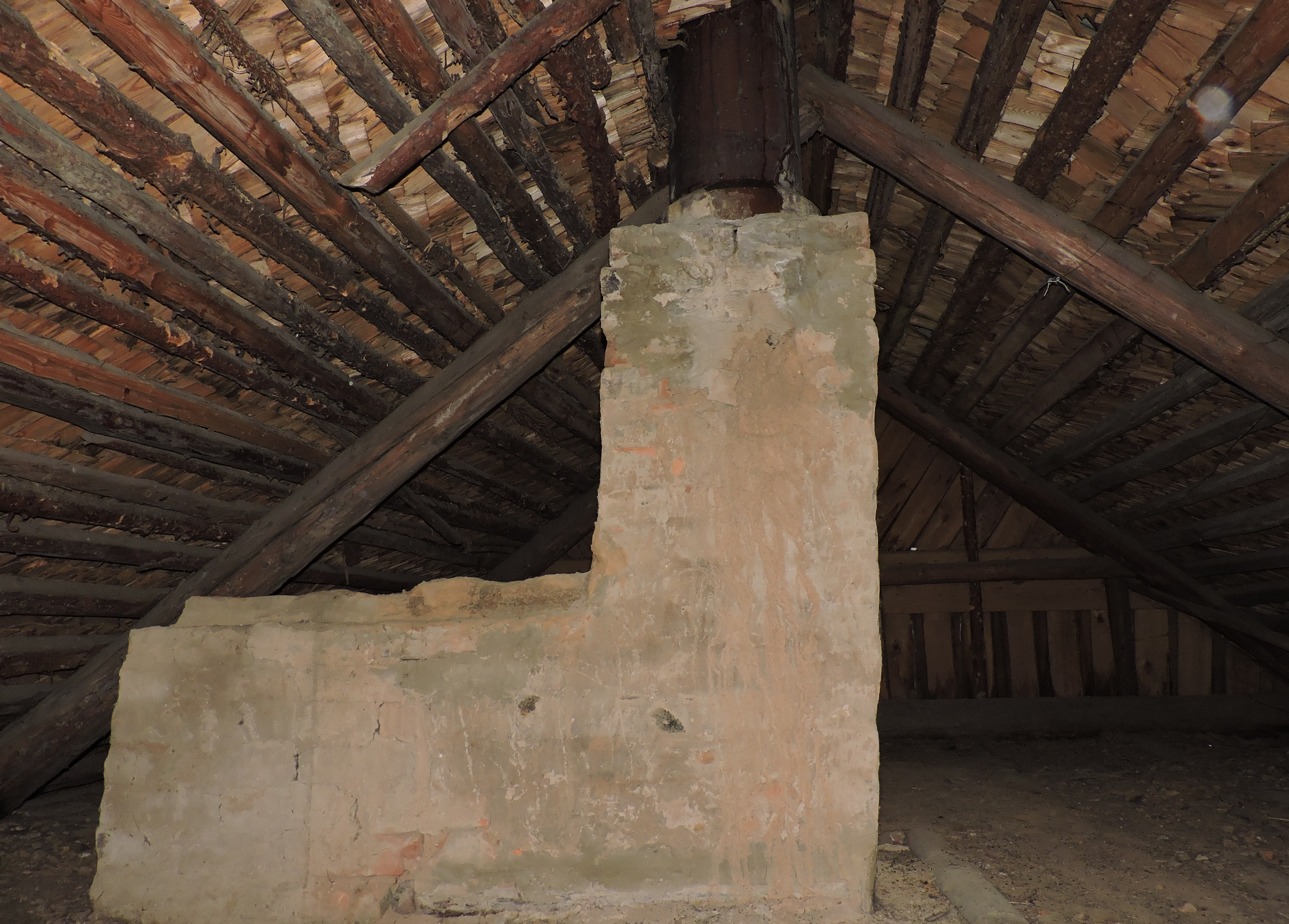
A rafter roof with boarded gable

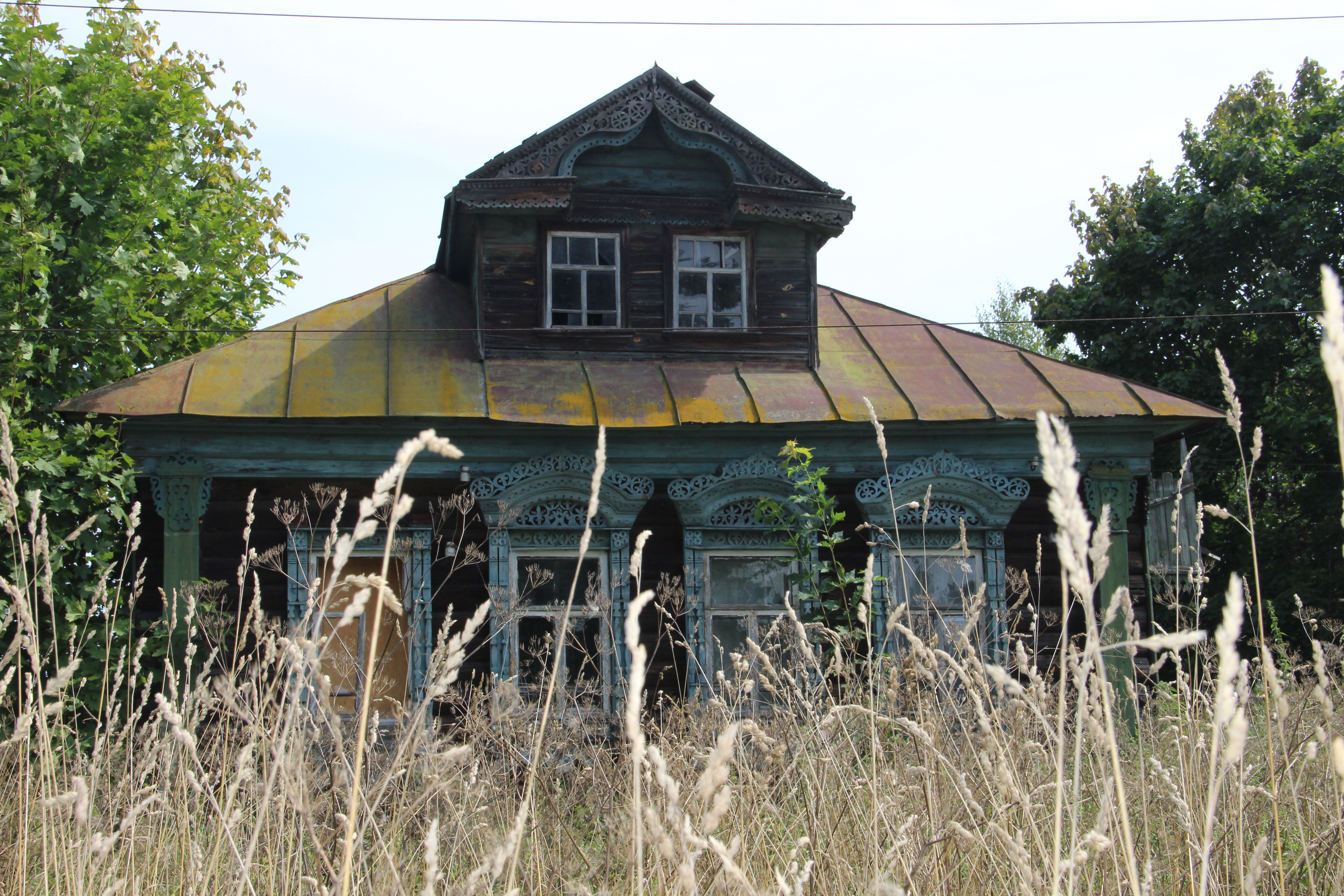
Four-pitched roof with mezzanine

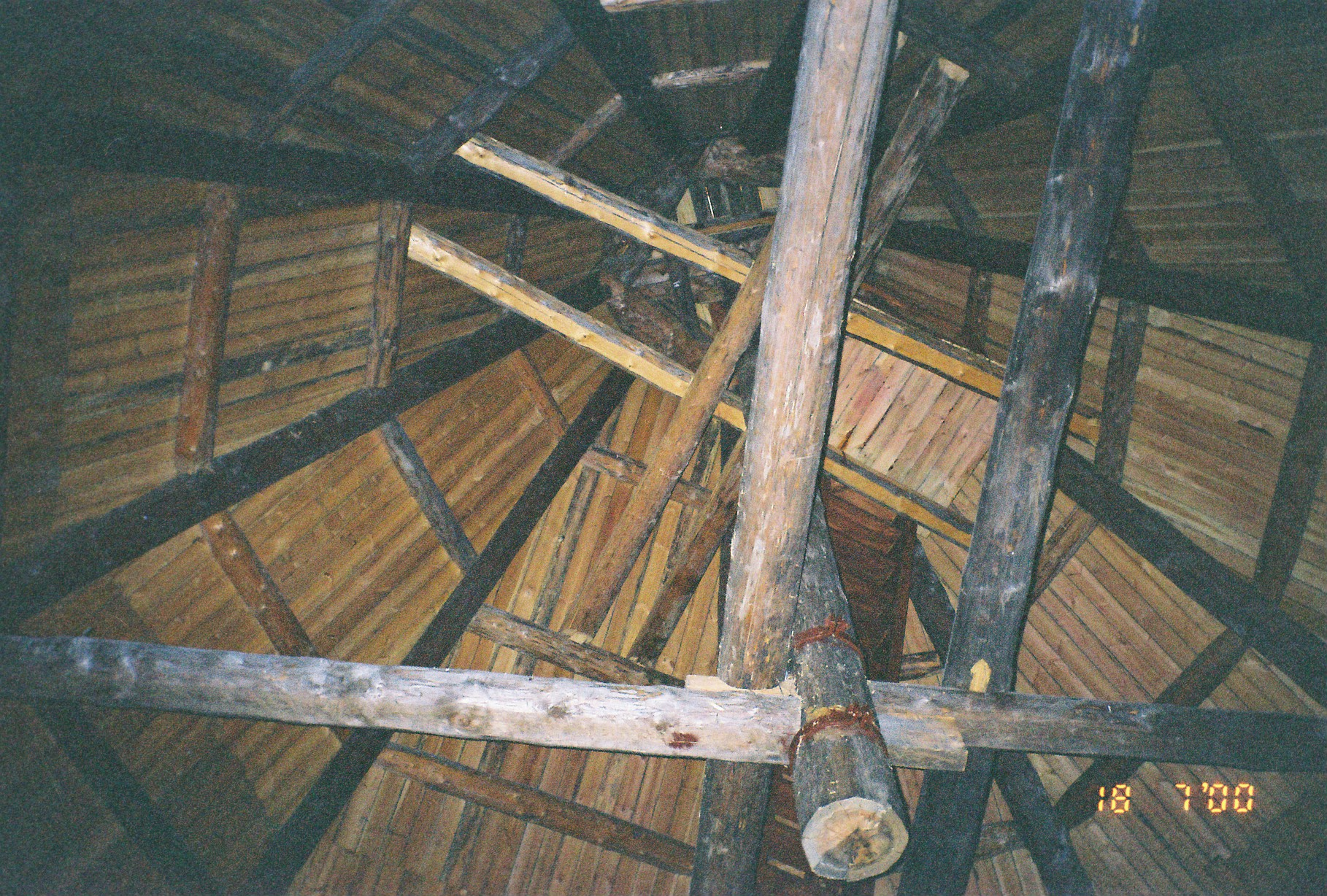
A raftered hipped roof. Axial pole and tie beams are visible

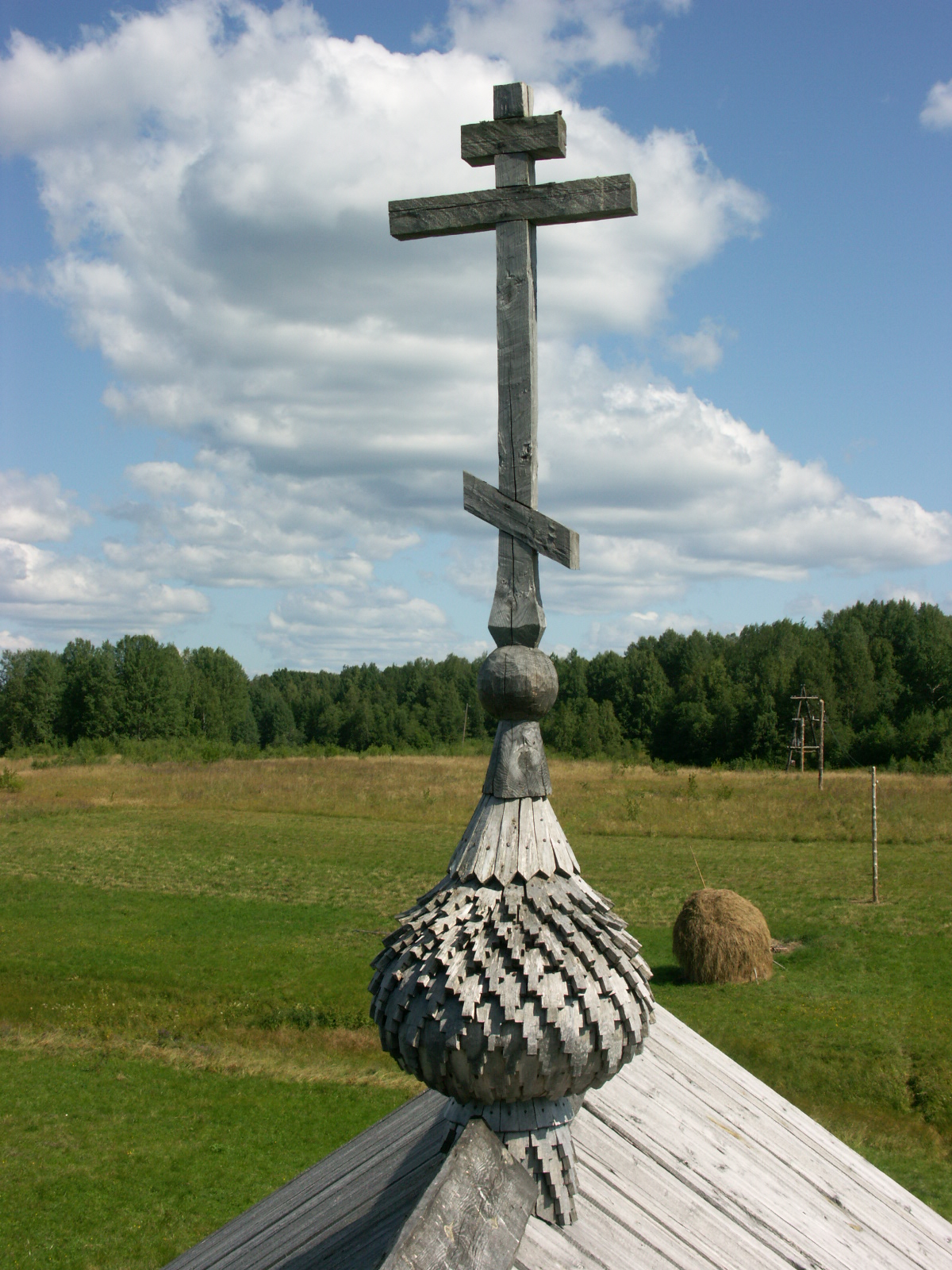
Onion head covered

=== Balconies, galleries and porches ===
Many wealthy northern houses of the 19th century had balconies in the middle of the gable, decorated with carvings and paintings. Galleries surrounding the house at the level of the second floor are characteristic of the Zaonezhye region. Galleries were especially popular in the arrangement of church porches. They rested on posts dug into the ground or on cantilevered logs.

Porches can be open and covered with a single or double pitch roof. Covered porches can be open from the sides with only a railing and posts; they can be partially or completely covered. The most complex are the northern porches with stairs, lower and upper platforms. The upper platform is supported by posts, cantilevered logs, or a log cabin. In churches, porches with two porches symmetrically arranged along the walls are common.

=== Carving ===
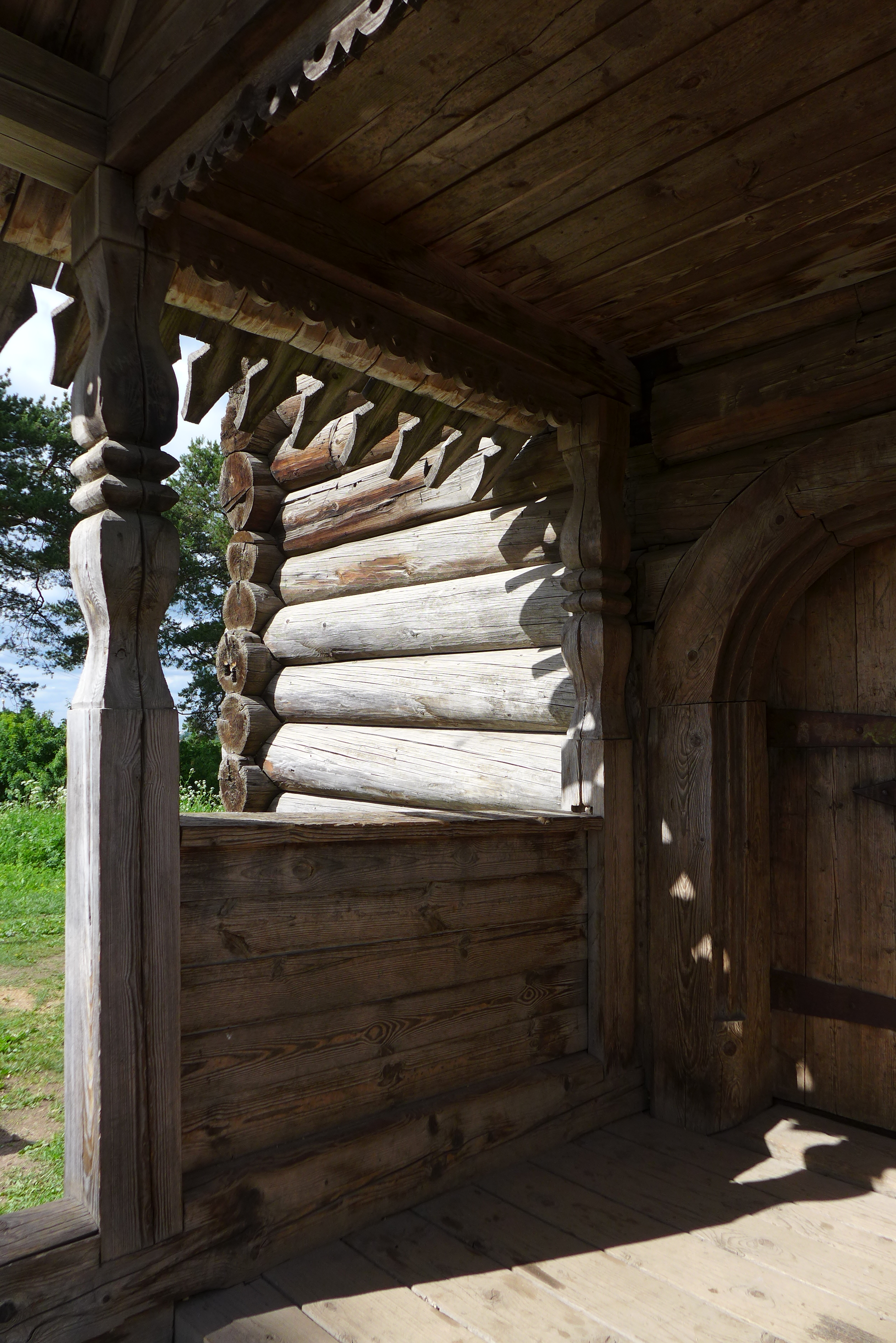
Traditional carving of red tar and pillars. Church porch, the 17th century.

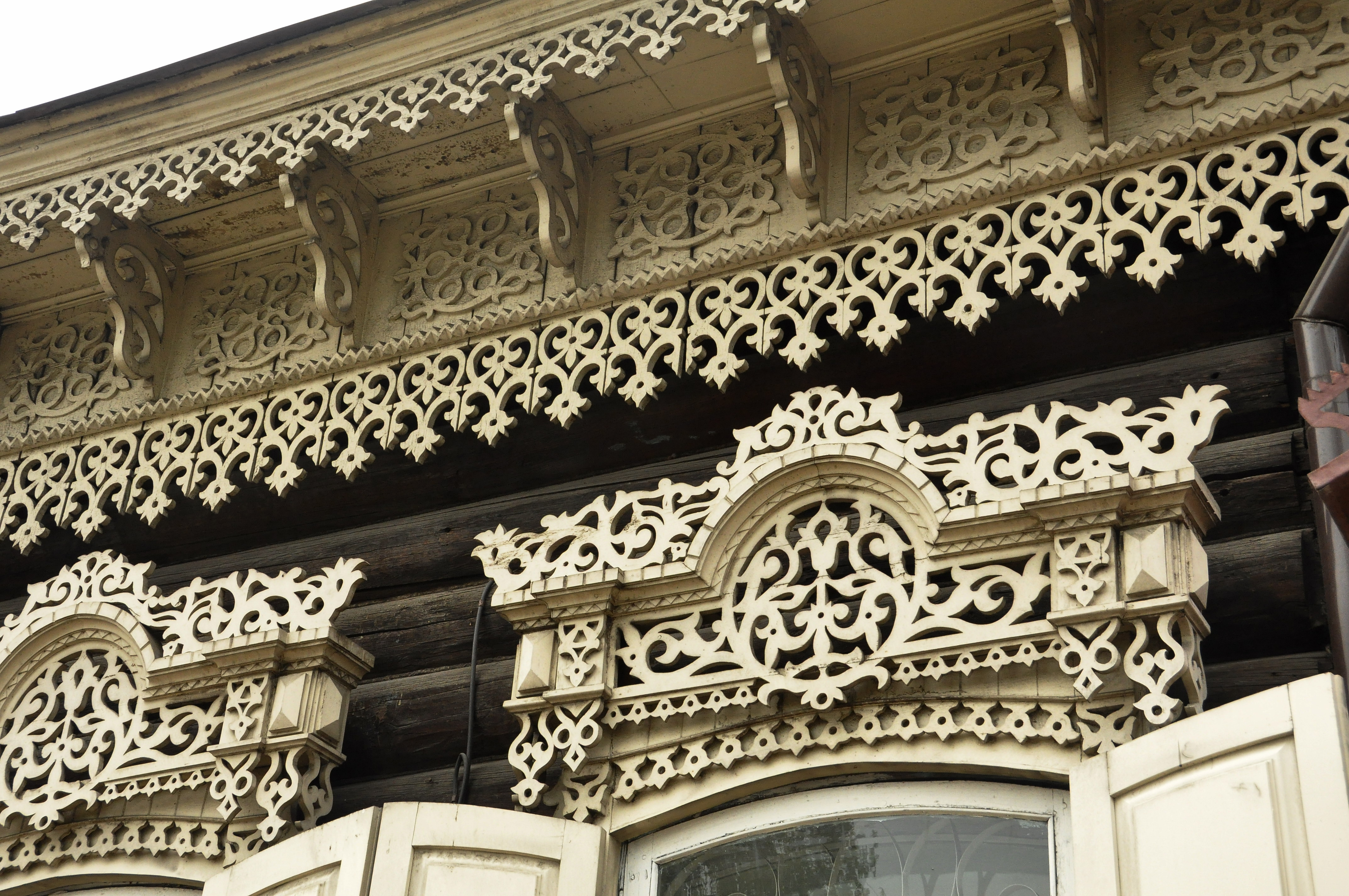
Lace pierced carving of the eclectic period. House of the early 20th century.

Wood carving is the predominant form of decoration. Carved details existed in antiquity. In pre-Mongol Great Novgorod, plates and furniture with carvings similar to the patterns in the Novgorod books were found. Ancient carving was characterized by restraint, expediency, organic connection with the construction, and a great sacral and mythological meaning. Structurally important elements were worked out: protruding roof details, protective boards, ends of roof timbers of nailed roofs, pillars. Some elements were finished in the shape of a horse's head, an ancient symbol of Slavic culture (there is evidence that in ancient times a wooden image was preceded by a real horse's head). Images of birds and flat reliefs with symbols of the sun were popular in roof design. With the appearance of slanted windows, carved slats spread. The change in roof design led to the appearance of a cornice under the gable, often decorated with carvings (podzoras). The extraordinary ornamental richness of these elements is characteristic for the regions of Nizhny Novgorod, Ivanovo and Yaroslavl. The basis of the pattern of local cottages is plant ornament with the inclusion of figures of lions, mermaids, sirin birds. Since the beginning of the 19th century blind ("ship") carving was popular here, later propylnaya carving spread. Its patterns became more airy with time and reached the greatest development in the 20th century. Late carving largely repeated the motifs of Baroque, Classicism and Eclecticism, and was little connected with the design. The carving of the North was characterized by simpler and more enlarged forms, geometric figures, solar symbols, and vegetable ornaments predominated. Siberian carving is poor in plant ornament motifs, and it's closer to flat relief carving.

=== Coloring and painting ===
Under the influence of the external environment, wood darkens over time and acquires shades of gray. In the past, painting was very rarely used. According to the conclusions of A.B. Bode, in the 17th and 18th centuries the roofs of churches were sometimes painted in one or two colors, using red, green, black (or dark green, dark blue); on the pictures of roofs there was repeatedly found a combination of red at the bottom and green at the top. Painting on the exterior of wooden buildings became a relatively common practice in the 19th and 20th centuries. Church roofs were painted in green and red, and thatched walls were painted in white and other colors. In urban civil architecture, the painting of yellow and gray walls imitated stone architecture and was complemented by white decorations. Roofs were painted green, red, and gray. Bright contrasting colors were used to paint elements of the decoration of village houses.

Painting of Russian houses is a very rare phenomenon. It was used in the construction of choirs, at the beginning of the 19th century it penetrated into the peasant environment of some settlements in Siberia, the Volga region, the Russian North and disappeared at the beginning of the 20th century. Geometric, vegetal, less often zoomorphic motifs, colorful and unexpected color combinations were used. The painting was done on flat elements (shutters, gables and overhanging roofs). There are known examples of paintings of church facades.

=== Interior ===
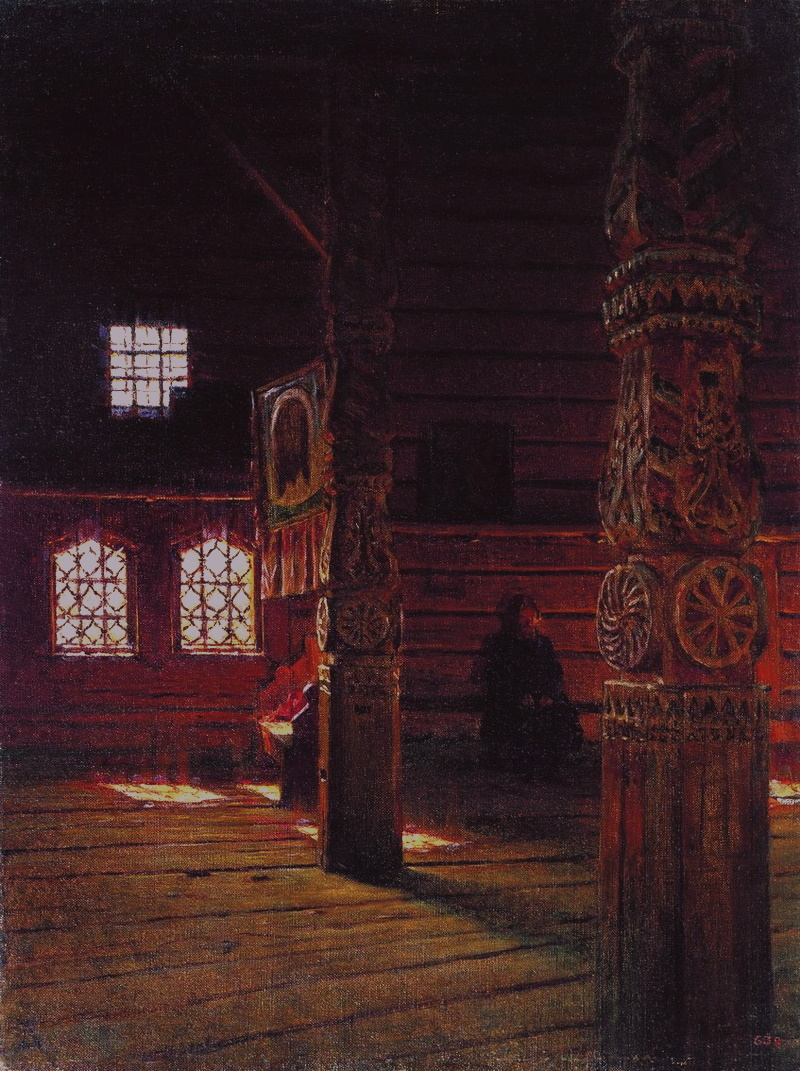
V. V. Vereshchagin. Interior view of the wooden church of Peter and Paul in Puchuga, 1894

The interior of the hut was spatially organized by corners. The most important were the stove corner, where a huge multifunctional Russian stove stood, and the red (front) corner with a sacristy and a table. The red corner was the most lighted place. These two corners were diagonal to each other. The woman's corner was called the corner where the hostess cooked food. The corner near the entrance was the subporozhye (back kut), which served as a workplace for the master of the house. Along the walls of the hut there were benches and shelves. Mobile furniture in the middle of the wall or in the middle of the room was a later phenomenon associated with the spread of urban culture in the 19th century. Light rooms and upper rooms served as ceremonial rooms and their walls were often decorated with wallpaper. The walls of the main room of the hut were neither taped nor painted, but simply trimmed. Partitions in peasant huts were a late phenomenon. Usually they separated only a fragment (corner) of the room. According to A. I. Nekrasov, the space of the Russian house was not characterized by enfilade construction, which, as well as in the organization of the space of the dweliing in the corners, manifested the statics of architecture and life of the Russian peasants.

In traditional churches, there was a gradual transition from the austere exterior to the detailed interior decoration. The low vestibule led to a higher refectory decorated with carved columns and benches, and then to an even higher room of the naios, where the richness of decoration reached the highest level in the carving and painting of iconostases. The iconostasis developed from the simplest shelf for icons to the templon design, then to the order (rack and beam) and finally to the frame design. The interior was completed by cleros, hanging and standing candlesticks, analoi, candle stalls and painted ceilings of the nave. Inner space on the shatra temple usually is 1/5 - 1/2 of the outer volume because of the availability of podshivnogo stream. It was necessary for a number of reasons connected with providing normal exploitation and longevity of structures.

=== Building organization and ensemble ===
The development of medieval settlements was inclined to picturesqueness, enclosure, centrality. In the 18th–19th centuries, Russian settlements acquired straight streets and other features of regular planning. Uniformity of building was achieved by the use of the same building material, a single technique of processing, modularity, by the size of the trunk, but these sizes still had a certain variability, which did not turn uniformity into monotony. Temple ensembles were placed with the expectation of the best perception from the main directions, away from the surrounding buildings for protection from fires. In cities and large villages, the ensembles consisted of the main summer church and a heated winter church, from the 17th to the 18th century: two temples and a bell tower, sometimes surrounded by a rubble fence. According to the conclusions of Y.S. Ushakov, in the northern architecture there were 2 main methods of interposition of buildings of the temple ensemble: on the diagonal (with 2 or 3 elements) and at the ends of the triangle (with 3 components). In this way it was possible to see the ensemble from all sides. The volumes of the ensembles were compared according to similarity or contrast.

=== Regional characteristics ===
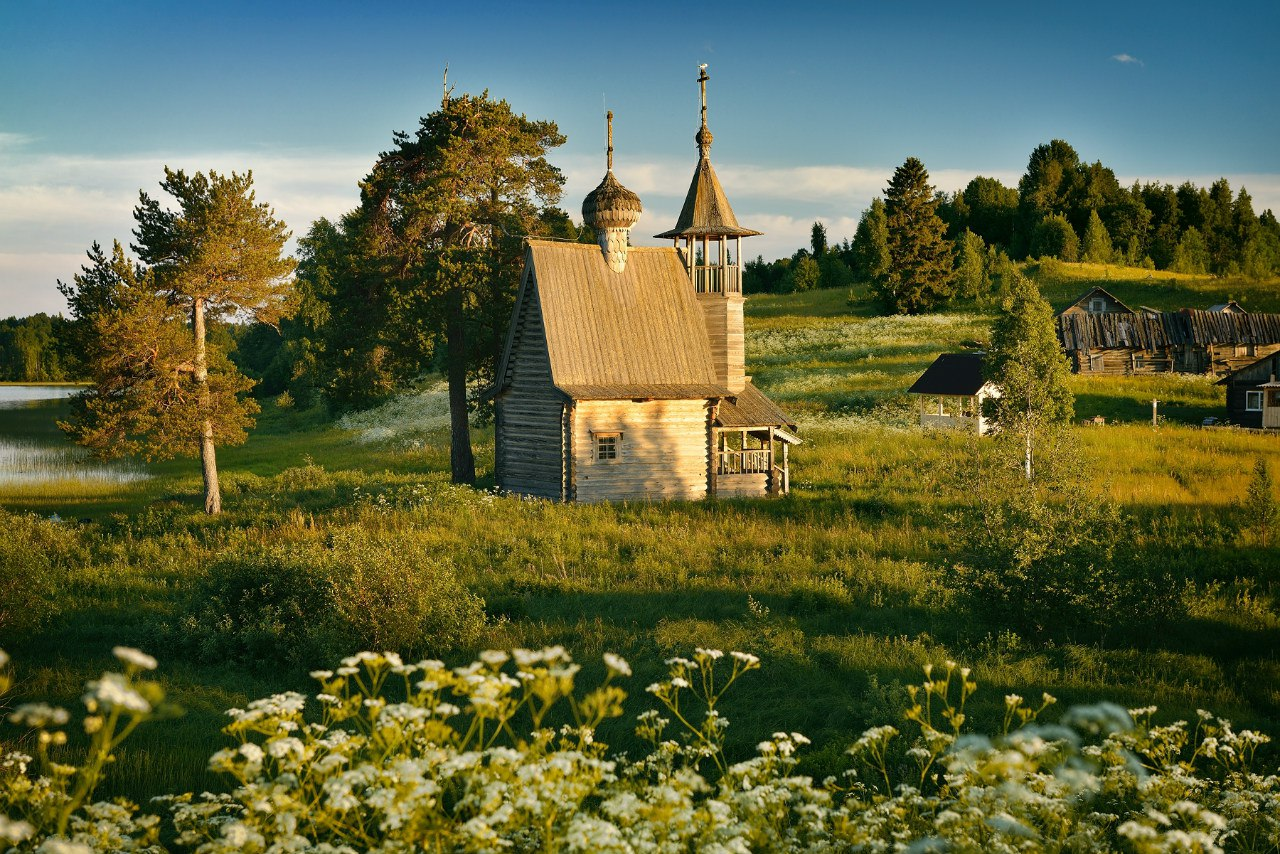
Kenozersky National Park (Arkhangelsk region). The merits of the buildings are evident when they are considered in their interrelation with the natural environment

==== Russian North ====
The Russian North has preserved the spiritual and material culture of the Russian people, including the medieval traditions of wooden architecture. Most of the preserved masterpieces are located here, where the rural landscape is formed by bushes (compact groups of villages), and often the name of the bush is used to designate the location of the monument (for example, the Church of the Nativity of Christ in Bolshaya Shalga is located in the village of Kazakovo). The Novgorod tradition, most clearly manifested in the western regions of the Russian North, is characterized by rectilinear forms, while more plastic forms from the Central Russian lands spread to the central and eastern regions. The height of the churches was achieved at the expense of the height of the log cabin in the western regions, and at the expense of the height of the completion in the eastern and southern regions.

The Vologda Oblast is known for the variety of monuments and a significant amount of 19th–20th century civil architecture decorated with carvings. In Zaonezhye there are many monuments of wooden architecture, including the ensemble of Kizhsky pogost with multi-domed churches of the 18th century and a tent bell tower of the 19th century. The Ilyinsky Vodlozersky pogost (Karelia, 1798) combines the traditions of cube-shaped ends and a barrel above the altar, connected by passages and porches.

In the northwestern Pioneer region, the octagonal columns of the temple pillar are characteristic, expanding upward with the help of valleys, and in the Mezhozero region, the upper octagonal columns were inserted into the "socket" of the lower one, creating the effect of an opening flower. The Poonezhye region is characterized by cuboid and barrel roofs, decorative kokoshniks, and baptismal plans.

Pomorie combines Poonezh and Podvin traditions in temple architecture, and domestic buildings are connected with Pomor crafts and are characterized by a strict appearance without decorations. In the areas of the Northern Dvina and Vaga rivers, central and columnar compositions are widespread, sometimes with octagonal hipped roofs surrounded by small chapels. In the remote areas of the Pinega and Mezen rivers, the historical layout of villages, oath crosses, windmills and monuments with tents on a baptismal font are well preserved.

==== Northwest lands ====
The architecture of the northwestern lands has its roots in Novgorod. The features of the old Novgorod tradition include, for example, the stepped and octagonal roofing of churches, which, however, spread to other regions. The buildings of the Pskov region are late and few in number, influenced by Belarusian and Ukrainian traditions (the Church of the Resurrection in Terebenyy).

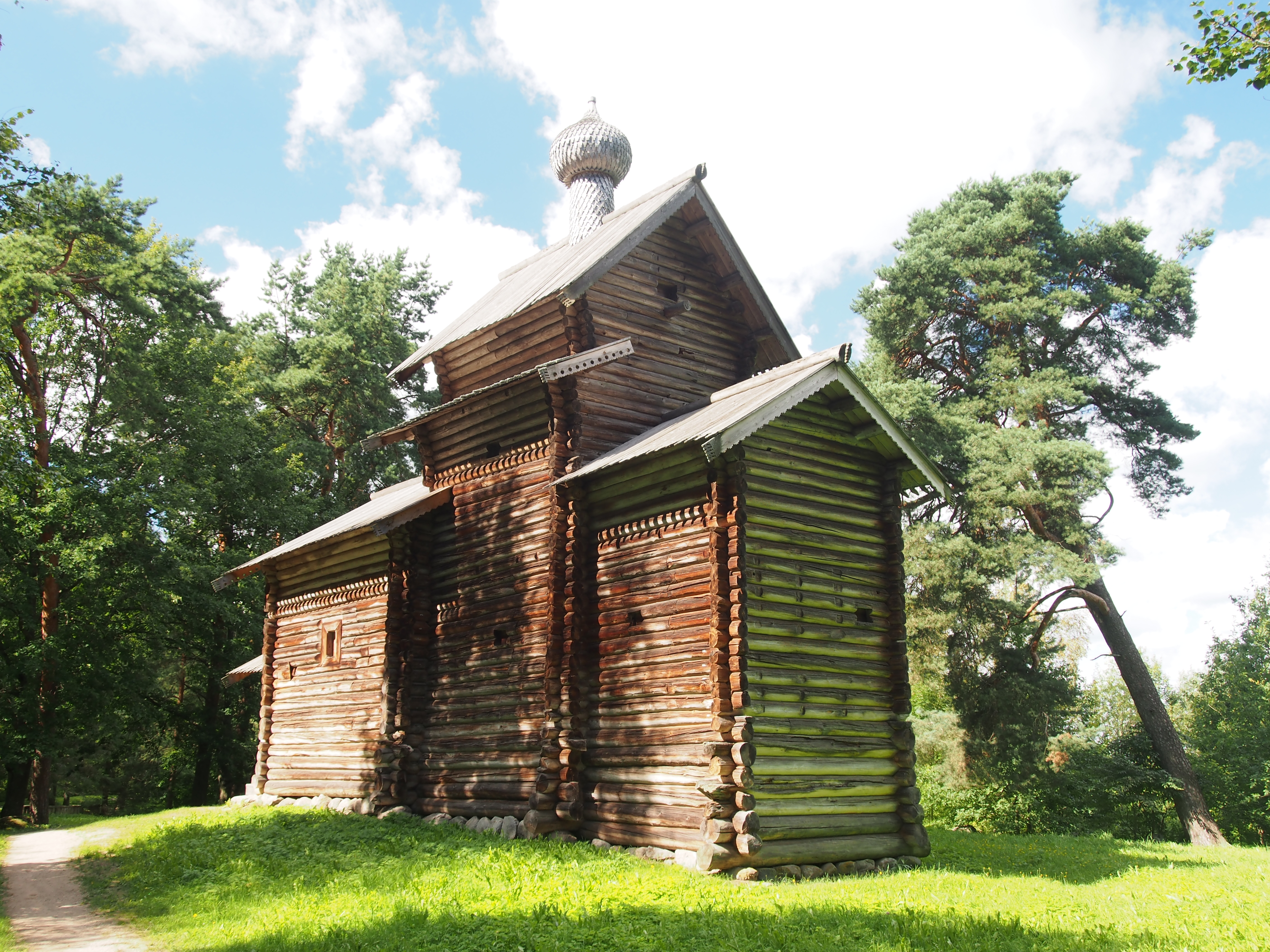
Church of St. Nicholas the Wonderworker from Tuholi (Novgorod Region), 1680s. An example of ancient Novgorod architectural traditions (stepped roof, high log cabin).

==== Central Russia ====
The buildings of the Central Russian village have much softer and more welcoming features in comparison with the architecture of the North. Their appearance was greatly influenced by the Volga region, from where light lace carvings spread and replaced modest ornamentation. Houses of the Middle Zone are characterized by a large number of rebuildings, the disappearance of traditional features. A typical example of an ancient Central Russian temple is the Church of the Resurrection in Bilyukovo village of in Plyos with a high gable roof. Later, stepped and domed temples spread. Central Russian churches of the 17th century have a more fractional and complex composition than their contemporary northern counterparts, often completed with a miniature five-domed roof. An example of an 18th-century stepped temple is the Church of St. George in Veretyeva with a closed roof on 8 gables. Like many local churches, its upper tiers are open and have windows. The wooden architecture of Nizhny Novgorod and other cities is well preserved from the 19th century.

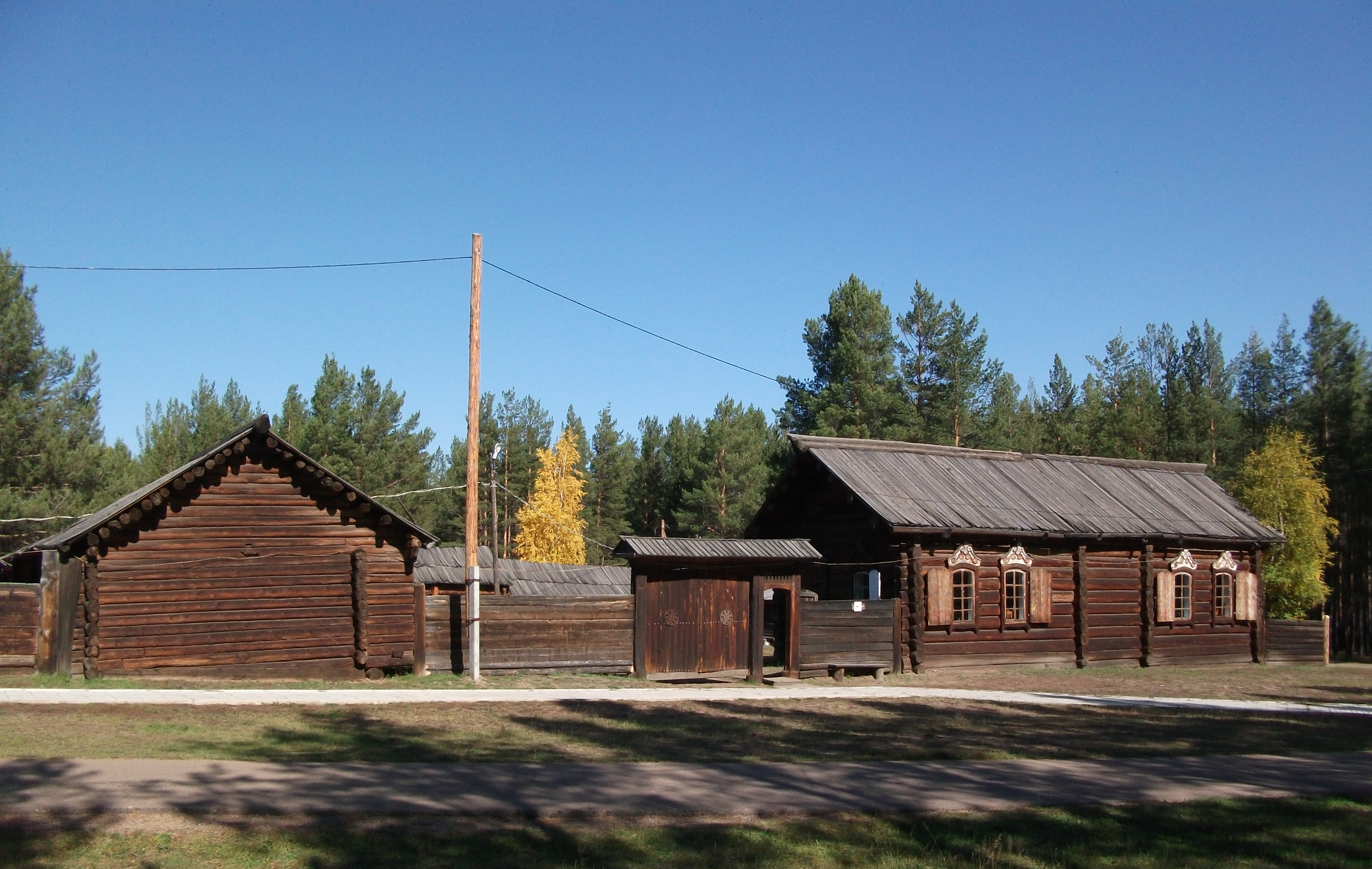
A Siberian Old Believer mansion in Nadeyino (Buryatia), the 19th century.

==== South Russia ====
South Russian wooden churches are characterized by relative modesty and simplicity, there were almost no complex multi-domed temples. Although the final works on the Ostrogozhsk Cathedral was decided quite original: "... two chapters are placed on the cage, the circle of chapters six barrels, and the chapters and barrels are upholstered with oak chushaya". The main type of church buildings in the South Russian cities of the 16th–17th centuries — cage temples. Later, bell towers and tent temples of the octagon on a square type became widespread. In the 18th–19th centuries, such churches were covered with a dome with a chapel.

==== Urals ====
The peasant houses of the southern part of the Middle Urals are similar to those of Central Russia and the Volga region. The houses of the northern regions were formed under the influence of the Russian North. Unlike their North Russian counterparts, they are smaller in size, lack attic lights, rich platbands, balconies and galleries. As in Siberia, houses in the Urals are characterized by austere and laconic forms. In the Urals homesteads, metal products were widely used for decoration, combining wrought and forged iron with wood carving.

==== Siberia ====
Siberian wooden architecture retained some features of Old Russian architecture; many buildings combined Russian traditions and the building culture of local peoples. In Siberia horse mills, defensive barns survived. A special place in Siberian architecture is occupied by the construction of fortresses, the towers of Belsky, Kazymsky, Ilimsk, Bratsky fortresses have survived to our days. Siberian peasants' houses are similar to the Central and North Russian ones, but they are more sparsely decorated and more confined: they are surrounded by high empty fences, the red line along with the facade of the house is marked by empty walls of outbuildings. There were various types of temples in Siberia. Since the 18th century they have lost their stylistic unity with their Central and North Russian analogues, having been influenced by metropolitan and Ukrainian architecture. Siberian architecture influenced the architecture of Russian America.

== Research and preservation works ==
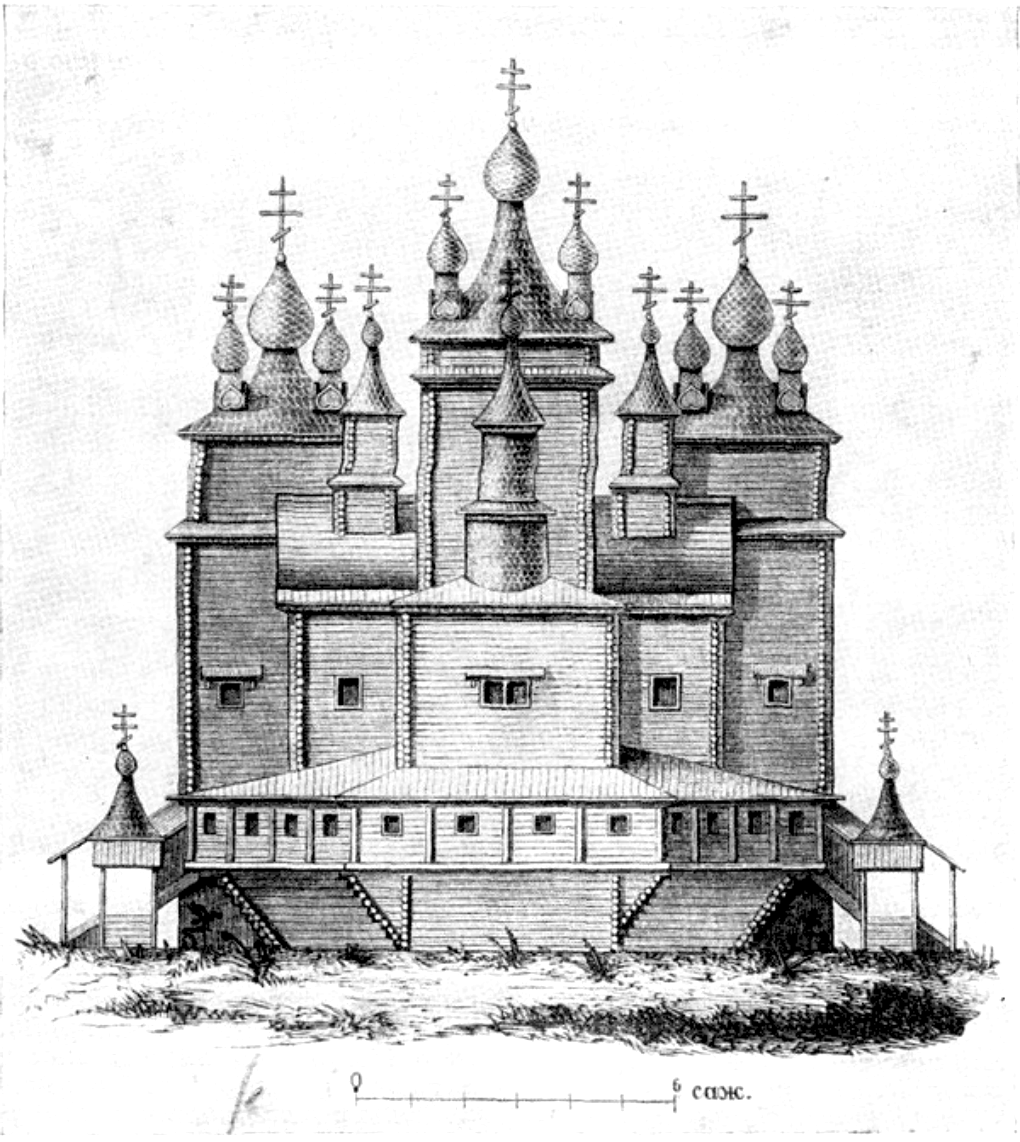
А. T. Zhukovsky. Drawing of the western facade of the Kola Cathedral of the Resurrection (Murmansk region).

For a long time wooden architecture did not attract the attention of researchers, it was considered a commonplace attribute of settlements and was not included in the sphere of art. Old buildings were often destroyed as they were considered to be dilapidated and unnecessary. Only in the second half of the 19th century, against the background of the growing interest in folk culture, attention to wooden architecture increased. In the 1850s, materials about the monuments began to be published, and in the 1870s the academician L. V. Dahl laid the foundation for a systematic study of wooden architecture.

Dahl's program was continued by a number of researchers, among whom V. V. Suslov stands out, who emphasized the importance of studying wooden buildings for understanding stone architecture and suggested introducing elements of ancient forms into modern art. In his opinion, it would be culpable to postpone the study of these monuments, as many of them would soon disappear. Suslov's works remain valuable to this day. Following the scientists, some artists such as A. E. Arkhipov, I. Y. Bilibin, and V. M. Vasnetsov, among others traveled to the Russian North and opened this treasure trove of Russian culture to the general public.

At the beginning of the 20th century, the Imperial Archaeological Commission was engaged in the study and protection of monuments. In 1910, the first volume of the History of Russian Art was published, for which I. E. Grabar and F. F. Gornostayev wrote a chapter on the wooden architecture of the Russian North. The works of that period focused mainly on religious architecture, but they began to consider peasant architecture as well. The main task at the beginning of the 20th century was to collect material, as knowledge of individual types and forms was limited.

Between 1917 and 1941, the study of wooden architecture slowed down, and many monuments were destroyed during the struggle against religion and the World War I. The short-lived and flammable nature of wood also contributed to the rapid loss of structures, which often burned and rotted. Archaeology and written sources aided in the reconstruction of ancient buildings.

In 1942 the book Russian wooden architecture was published, which dealt in detail with civil and religious architecture. In the post-war years a significant contribution to the study of wooden architecture was made by A. V. Opolovnikov. In the 1970s, the passportization of monuments began, and the works of Y. S. Ushakov in the 1980s focused on the spatial organization of the built environment. An important contribution to the study of the typology of wooden architecture was made by the academician V. P. Orfinsky.

In 1990, the Kizhi Pogost was inscribed on the UNESCO World Heritage List.

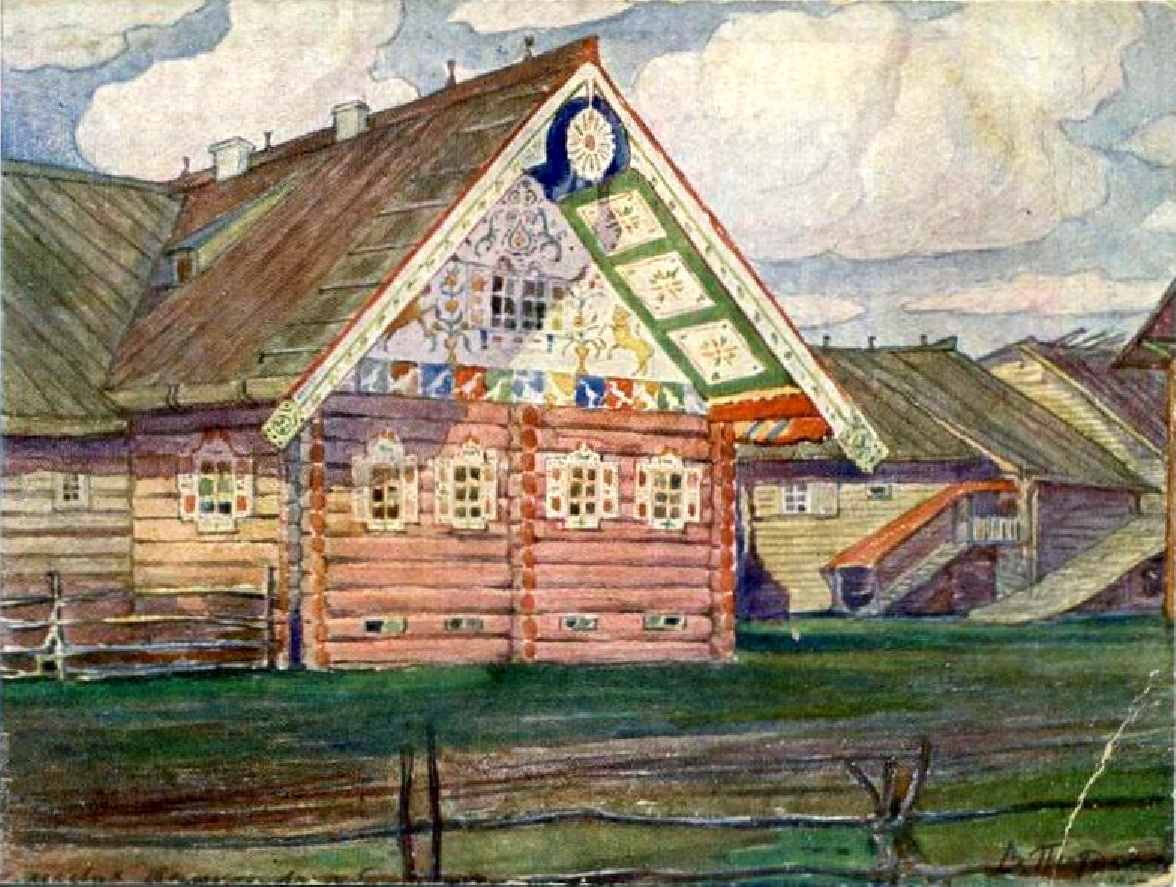
V. A. Plotnikov. A peasant's house in the village of Sheleksa, Arkhangelsk province, 1915.

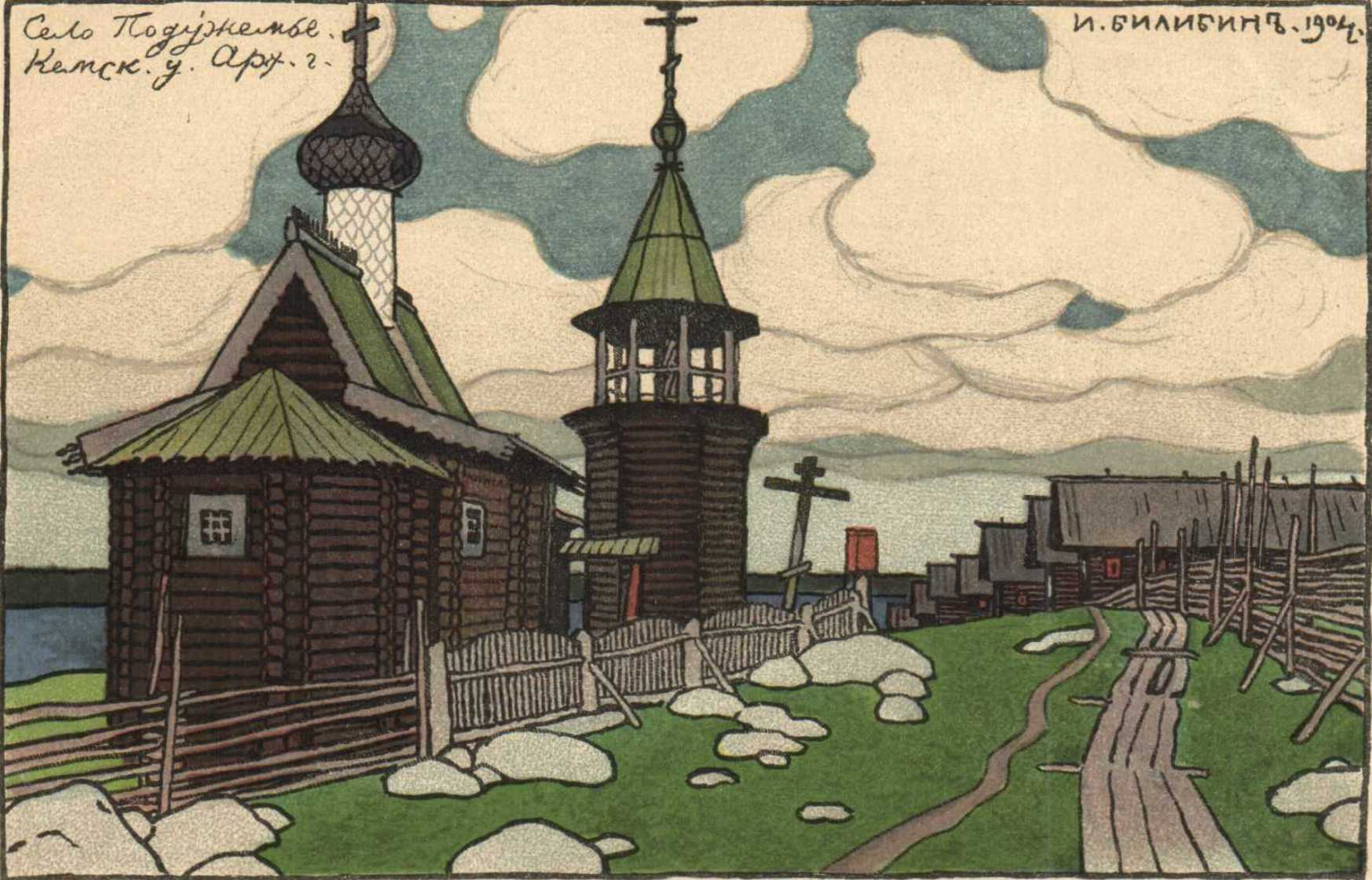
I. Y. Bilibin. Poduzhemye Village, Kemsky Uyezd, Arkhangelsk Gubernia, 1904.

=== Current condition of monuments ===
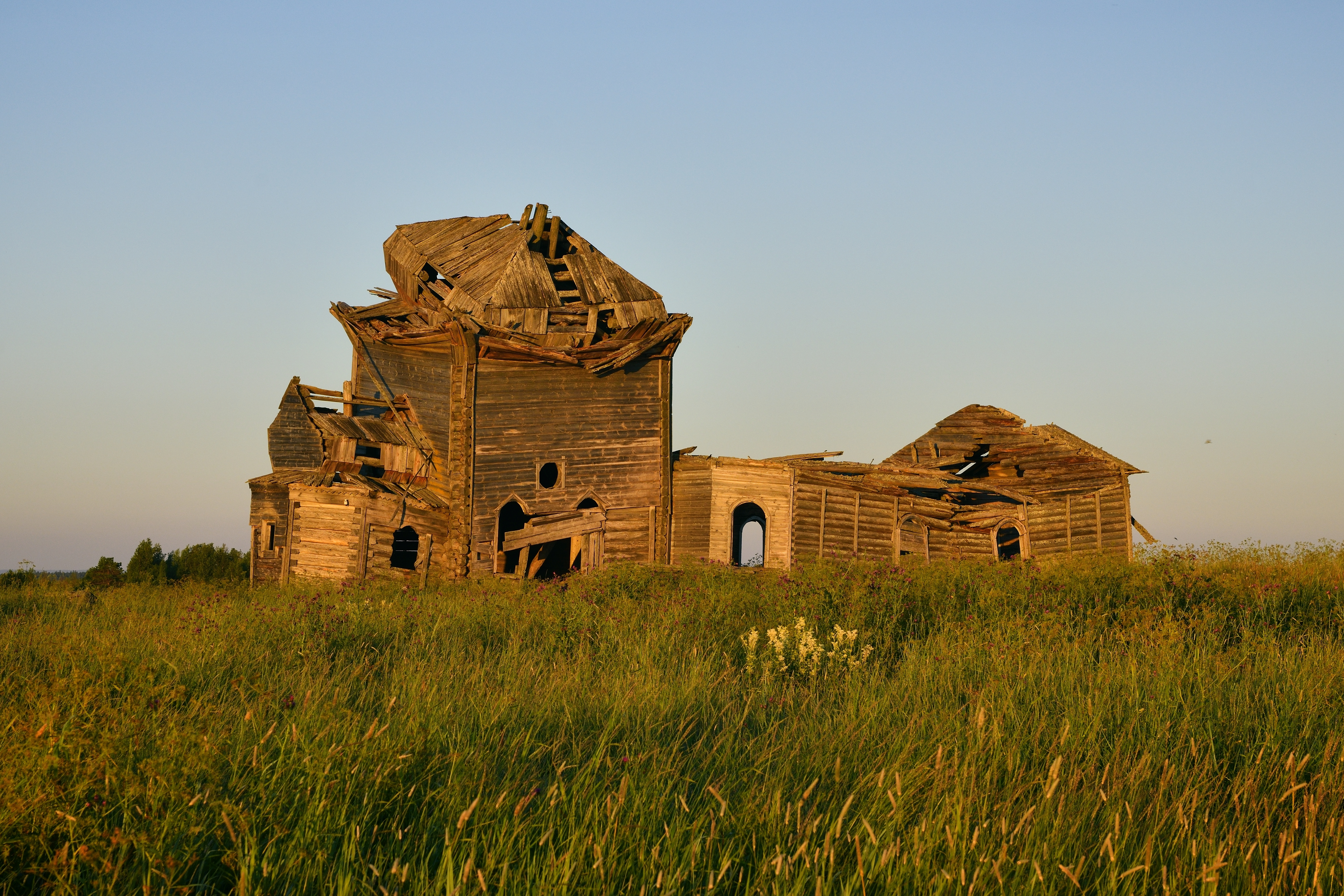
Ruins of the Church of Saint Nicholas of Myra in Unyezhma (Arkhangelsk region). The beginning of the 19th century.

There are several thousand historical wooden buildings in Russia, many of which are cultural heritage objects. However, the situation with their preservation is critical and is considered hopeless by some experts. Despite their number, wooden buildings remain the most vulnerable part of Russia's architectural heritage. Losses continue, and only about 15% of the temples described in the 1942 book have survived to the present day. Urban wooden buildings are also being destroyed, as can be seen in the disappearing districts of Arkhangelsk, Tula, Nizhny Novgorod, and Tobolsk.

The main causes of losses are collapses, fires, unauthorized dismantling, and incomplete restoration. Experts such as M. I. Milchik and A. V. Popov emphasize the insufficient attention of the state to this problem. The situation is aggravated by the approaching age of the buildings, the lack of fire protection, and the lack of public understanding of their cultural significance.

In 2019, the Russian Ministry of Culture approved the Concept of preservation of wooden architectural monuments and their inclusion in the cultural turnover until 2025, developed in 2016 by the company Ecokultura. According to it, 14.25 billion rubles were needed to save these monuments.

== Russian tradition of wooden architecture and modern times ==
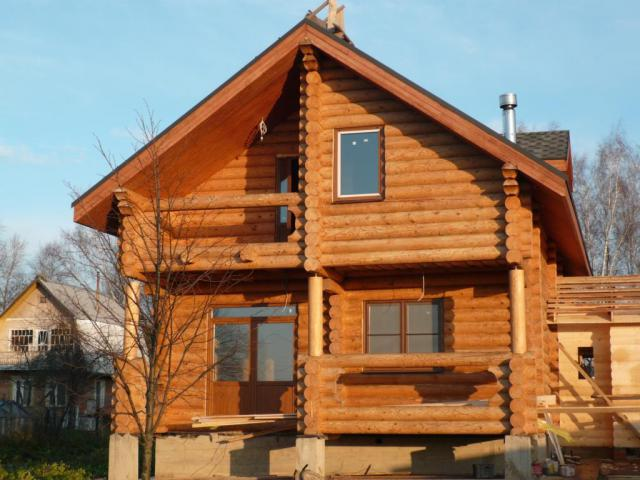
Modern house made of cylindrical logs

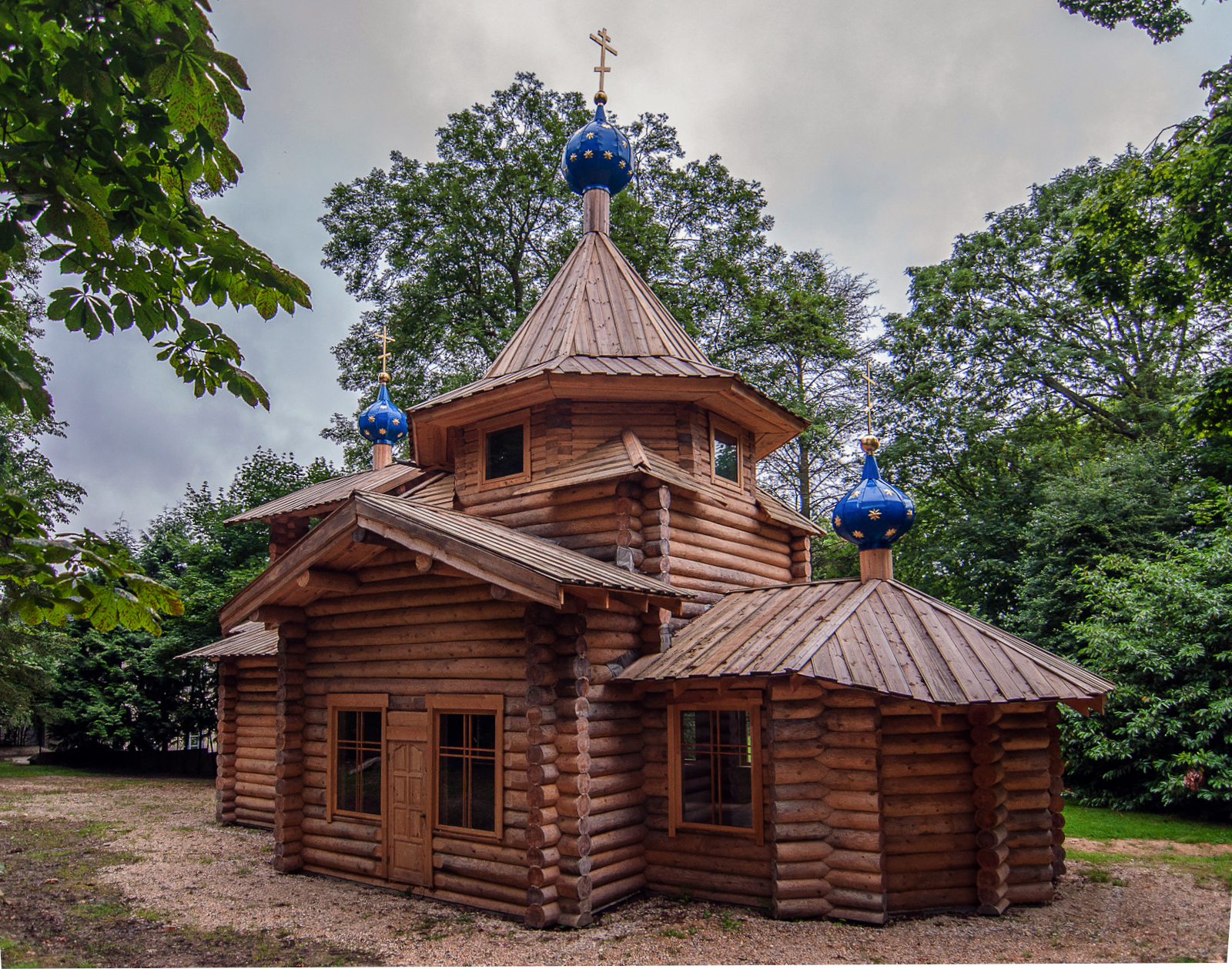
The Church of the Nativity of the Virgin Mary in Epinay-sous-Sénard, France, 2014.

I. M. Korobyina, in her book Russian Wooden. View from the 21st century, writes that wooden architecture:

...has been and remains one of the strongest points of reference for the Russian national identity, which is especially relevant today, at the beginning of the 21st century, when the question arises once again: who are we and where do we come from, what connects us to the land where we live?

However, the potential of wood in modern Russian urban architecture remains untapped. Most of the nominees for the Archivwood Award for Wooden Architecture are rural objects and park buildings. In the opinion of many researchers, it is the new wooden urban construction, including those based on traditional models, that can maintain a lively interest in the heritage of wooden architecture.

== See also ==
- Architecture of Russia
- Malye Korely (Arkhangelsk Oblast)
- Khokhlovka (Perm Krai)
- Ust-Borovaya Saltworks (Perm Krai)
- Ulan-Ude Ethnographic Museum (Buryatia)
- Kenozersky National Park (Plesetsky District)

== Bibliography ==
=== General sources about Russian traditional wooden architecture ===
- Ащепков, Е. А. (1950a). Русское деревянное зодчество (in Russian). М.: изд-во и 2-я тип. Гос. изд-ва архитектуры и градостроительства.
- Ащепков, Е. А. (1950b). Русское народное зодчество в Западной Сибири (PDF) (in Russian). М.: Изд-во Акад. архитектуры. Archived from the original (PDF) on 2014-10-26.
- Ащепков, Е. А. (1953). Русское народное зодчество в Восточной Сибири (PDF) (in Russian). М.: Гос. изд-во литературы по строительству и архитектуре. Archived from the original (PDF) on 2014-10-26.
- Архитектурный путеводитель по деревянному зодчеству Русского Севера (in Russian). М.: Институт Наследия. 2018.
- Бломквист, Е. Э. (1956). Крестьянские постройки русских, украинцев и белорусов (поселения, жилища и хозяйственные строения) // Восточнославянский этнографический сборник / отв. ред. С. А. Токарев (PDF) (in Russian). Vol. XXXI. М.: Изд-во Акад. наук СССР. pp. 3–458.
- Бодэ, А. Б. (2010). Деревянное зодчество Русского Севера. Архитектурная сокровищница Поонежья (in Russian) (2nd ed.). М.: КомКнига.
- Бубнов, Е. Н. (1988). Русское деревянное зодчество Урала (in Russian). М.: Стройиздат. ISBN 978-5-04-184514-8.
- Горностаевъ Ѳ. Ѳ., Грабарь И. Э. (1910). Деревянное зодчество Русскаго сѣвера // Исторія русскаго искусства (in Russian). Vol. Т. 1. Архитектура. До-петровская эпоха. М.: Изданіе I. Кнебель.
- Громов, Г. Г. (1977). Жилище // Очерки русской культуры XVI века / под ред. А. В. Арциховского (in Russian). Vol. Часть 1: Материальная культура. М.: Изд-во Московского университета, 1977.
- Громов, Г. Г. (1979). Жилище // Очерки русской культуры XVII века / гл. ред. А. В. Арциховский (in Russian). Vol. 1. М.: Изд-во Московского университета.
- Громов, Г. Г. (1985). Крестьянское жилище // Очерки русской культуры XVIII века / гл. ред. Б. А. Рыбаков (in Russian). Vol. 1. М.: Изд-во Московского университета.
- Дмитриева, С. И. (2006). Архитектура и декор крестьянской усадьбы // Традиционное искусство русских Европейского Севера: этнографический альбом (PDF) (in Russian). М.: Наука. pp. 34–75.
- Забелло, С. Я.; Иванов, В. Н.; Максимов, П. Н. (1942). Русское деревянное зодчество (in Russian). М.: Изд-во Акад. архитектуры.
- Красовскій, М. В. (1916). "Часть 1. Деревянное зодчество". Курсъ исторіи русской архитектуры (PDF) (in Russian). Петроградъ: Товарищество Р. Голике и А. Вильборгъ. Звенигородская, 11.
- Лисенко, Л. М. (1987). Русское деревянное зодчество // Дерево в архитектуре и скульптуре славян / науч. ред. Г. Н. Бочаров. М.: Советский художник.
- Маковецкий, И. В. (1962). Архитектура русского народного жилища: Север и Верхнее Поволжье (in Russian). М.: Изд-во Акад. наук СССР.
- Максимов П. Н. (1959). "Глава третья. Деревянная архитектура XVII века". История русского искусства / под общ. ред. И. Э. Грабаря, В. С. Кеменова и В. Н. Лазарева (in Russian). Vol. IV. М.: Изд-во Акад. наук СССР. pp. 91–121.
- Малков, Я. В. (1997). Древнерусское деревянное зодчество (PDF) (in Russian). М.: Муравей.
- Мехова, Г. И. (1965). 6 Русское деревянное зодчество (in Russian). М.: Советский художник.
- Мильчик М. И., Ушаков Ю. С. (1981). Деревянная архитектура русского Севера. Страницы истории (PDF) (in Russian). Л.: Стройиздат, Ленинградское отделение.
- Некрасов, А. И. (1924). Архитектура // Русское народное искусство (in Russian). М.: Гос. изд-во.
- Ополовников, А. В. (1955). Памятники деревянного зодчества Карело-Финской ССР (in Russian). М.: Стройиздат.
- Ополовников, А. В. (1983). Русское деревянное зодчество (in Russian). Vol. 1. Гражданское зодчество. М.: Искусство.
- Ополовников, А. В. (1986). Русское деревянное зодчество (in Russian). Vol. 2. М.: Искусство.
- Ополовников, А. В. (1989). Сокровища Русского Севера (PDF) (in Russian). М.: Стройиздат.
- Ополовников А. В., Ополовникова Е. А. (1998). Дерево и гармония: Образы деревянного зодчества России: Кн. для юношества (in Russian). М.: Ополо.
- Орфинский В. П., Гришина И. Е. (2004). Типология деревянного культового зодчества Русского Севера (in Russian). Петрозаводск: Изд-во Петрозаводского государственного университета.
- Пермиловская, А. Б. (2013). Культурные смыслы народной архитектуры Русского Севера (in Russian). УрО РАН.
- Прохоренко, А. И. (1992). "Глава 1. Русское народное жилище". Архитектура сельского дома: прошлое и настоящее (in Russian). М.: Агропромиздат.
- Рабинович, М. Г. (1988). "1. Двор и дом". Очерки материальной культуры русского феодального города. М.: Наука.
- Раппопорт, П. А. (1975). Древнерусское жилище. Археология СССР. Свод археологических источников. Выпуск Е1-32. Л.: Наука.
- Русское деревянное зодчество. Произведения народных мастеров и вековые традиции / сост. и отв. ред. А. Б. Бодэ (in Russian). М.: Северный паломник. 2012.
- Русское деревянное. Взгляд из XXI века: в 2 т. (in Russian). Vol. 1. Архитектура XIV–XIX веков. М.: Кучково поле. 2015.
- Русское деревянное. Взгляд из XXI века: в 2 т. (in Russian). Vol. 2. Архитектура XIX–XXI веков. М.: Кучково поле. 2016.
- Сусловъ, В. В. (1889). О древнихъ деревянныхъ постройкахъ сѣверныхъ окраинъ Россіи // Очерки по исторіи древне-русскаго зодчества. СПб: Типографія А. Ф. Маркса. Средняя Подъяческая, № 1. pp. ru.
- Туманик, А. Г. (2009). Деревянное зодчество Сибири XVII — начала XX в // Историческая энциклопедия Сибири: в 3 т / гл. ред. В. А. Ламин (in Russian). Vol. V. 1. А—И. Новосибирск: Историческое наследие Сибири.
- Ушаков, Ю. С. (1974). Деревянное зодчество русского Севера (народные традиции и современные проблемы) (PDF) (in Russian). Ленинград: Знание.
- Ушаков, Ю. С. (2007). Народное деревянное зодчество // История русской архитектуры. М.: Архитектура-С.
- Ходаковский, Е. В. (2009). Деревянное зодчество Русского Севера: Учебно-методическое пособие / под ред. В. А. Булкина (in Russian). СПб: СПбУ.

=== The initial period of the history of wooden architecture (up to the 16th century) ===
- Иоаннисян, О. М. (1994–1996). Деревянные храмы домонгольской Руси // Успенская церковь в Кондопоге: сборник статей по материалам конференции (in Russian).
- Колчин, Б. А.; Хорошев, А. С.; Янин, В. Л. (1981). Усадьба новгородского художника XII в. (in Russian). М.: Наука.
- Максимов П. Н., Воронин Н. Н. (1955). "Глава 3. Искусство русского централизованного государства. Деревянное зодчество XIII—XVI веков". История русского искусства / под общ. ред. И. Э. Грабаря, В. Н. Лазарева и В. С. Кеменова (in Russian). Vol. III. М.: Изд-во Акад. наук СССР. pp. 245–281.
- Максимов, П. Н. Деревянные церкви (1966). "Глава 9. Архитектура древнерусского государства (X — начала XIII в.)". Всеобщая история архитектуры в 12 томах / под ред. Ю. С. Яралова (отв. ред.) и др (in Russian). Vol. 3: Архитектура Восточной Европы. Средние века. Ленинград; М.: Стройиздат. pp. 528–529.
- Ковалевский, В. Н. (2002). Славянские жилища VIII-первой половины XI вв. в Днепро-Донском лесостепном междуречье. Диссертация на соискание учёной степени кандидата исторических наук (in Russian).
- Максимов, П. Н. (1975). Творческие методы древнерусских зодчих (in Russian). М.: Стройиздат.
- Рабинович, М. Г. (1969). "Часть 1: Материальная культура". Жилище // Очерки русской культуры XIII—XV веков / под ред. А. В. Арциховского. М.: Изд-во Московского университета.
- Рабинович, М. Г. (1964). О древней Москве (in Russian). М.: Наука.
- Раппопорт, П. А. (1986). Зодчество Древней Руси (in Russian). Л.: Наука, Лен. отд.
- Моргунов, Ю. Ю. (2003). Сампсониев Остров. Пограничная крепость на посульской окраине Южной Руси в XI-XIII веках (in Russian). М.: Наука.
- Толочко, П. П. (1981). Массовая застройка Киева X—XIII вв // Древнерусские города / отв. ред. В. В. Седов. М.: Наука.

=== Fortress architecture ===
- Раппопорт, П. А. (1965). Древние русские крепости. М.: Наука.
- Крадин, Н. П. (1988). Русское деревянное оборонное зодчество. М.: Искусство.
- Косточкин, В. В. (1969). Крепостное зодчество Древней Руси. М.: Изобразительное искусство.
- Косточкин, В. В. (1962). Русское оборонное зодчество конца XIII — начала XVI веков. М.: Изд-во Акад. наук СССР.

=== Construction techniques, structures, restoration ===
- Бодэ, А. Б.; Зинина, О. А. (2016). Традиционные русские плотницкие технологии. Работа с деревом, конструкции, архитектура (in Russian). М.: Институт Наследия.
- Жирнов, А. А. (1927). Крестьянин плотник-строитель (in Russian). М., Ленинград: Государственное изд-во.
- Милославский, М. Г. (1956). Техника деревянного зодчества на Руси в XVI‑XVII вв // Труды Института истории естествознания и техники АН СССР. Vol. 7.
- Ополовников, А. В. (1974). Реставрация памятников народного зодчества (in Russian). М.: Стройиздат.
- Попов, А. В. (2007). Конструкции русских деревянных сооружений XVII-XVIII веков. Материалы выставки (PDF) (in Russian).
- Подъяпольский С. С., Горшин С. Н. (1977). "Глава VI. Реставрация построек из дерева". Методика реставрации памятников архитектуры / под. общ. ред. Е. В. Михайловского (in Russian). М.: Стройиздат.
- Подъяпольский, С.С.; Бессонов, Г.Б.; Беляев, Л.А.; Постникова, Т.М. (1988). Конструкции русского деревянного зодчества // Реставрация памятников архитектуры.
- Самойлов, В.С. (2006). Строительство деревянного дома (in Russian). М.: Аделант. p. 384.

=== Dictionaries ===
- Сыщиков, А. Д. (2006). Лексика крестьянского деревянного строительства. СПб: Филологический факультет СПбГУ.
- Шинаев, С. Я. (1992). Деревянное зодчество. Толковый словарь терминов и понятий (PDF). М.: Спецпроектреставрация.

=== Other sources ===
- Авдусин, Д. А. (1989). Основы археологии (in Russian). М.: Высшая школа.
- Авдусин, Д. А. (1977). Археология СССР (in Russian). М.: Высшая школа.
- Байбурин, А. К. (1983). Жилище в обрядах и представлениях восточных славян (in Russian). Ленинград: Наука: Ленинградское отд-ние.
- Беловинский, Л. В. (2012). Жизнь русского обывателя. Изба и хоромы (in Russian). М.: Кучково поле.
- Всеобщая история архитектуры. Vol. 12. Книга первая. Архитектура СССР / под ред. Н. В. Баранова (отв. ред.), Н. П. Былинкина, А. В. Иконникова, Л. И. Кирилловой [и др.]. М.: Стройиздат. 1975.
- Жеребцов, Л. Н. (1961). Памятники народного зодчества Коми АССР (in Russian). Сыктывкар: Коми книжное изд-во.
- Заграевский, С. В. (2019). Три главных историко-архитектурных вопроса древнерусского шатрового зодчества (происхождение, первый каменный шатровый храм, запрет патриарха Никона).
- Загорульский, Э. М. (2012). Славяне: происхождение и расселение на территории Беларуси (in Russian). Минск: БГУ.
- Ильин, М. А. (1980). Русское шатровое зодчество. Памятники середины XVI века: Проблемы и гипотезы, идеи и образы (in Russian). М.: Искусство.
- Киселёв, И. А. (2005). Архитектурные детали в русском зодчестве XVIII—XIX веков: справочник архитектора-реставратора (in Russian). М.: Academia. Archived from the original on 2020-03-03.
- Средневековая Ладога: новые археологические открытия и исследования / отв. ред. В. В. Седов (in Russian). Ленинград: Наука. 1985.
- Лисенко, Л. М. (1984). Дерево в архитектуре (in Russian). М.: Стройиздат.
- Византийское и русское искусство: для строительных факультетов высших учебных заведений (in Russian). М.: Издание Государственного универсального магазина. 1924.
- Некрасов, А. И. (1936). Древнерусское зодчество XI-XVII века. Очерки по истории древнерусского зодчества (in Russian). М.: Изд-во Всесоюзной акад. архитектуры.
- Нидерле, Л. (1956). Славянские древности (in Russian). М.: Изд-во иностранной литературы.
- Орфинский, В. П. (1972). Деревянное зодчество Карелии (in Russian). Ленинград: Стройиздат.
- Святилища / Петрухин В. Я. // Славянские древности: Этнолингвистический словарь: в 5 т. / под общ. ред. Н. И. Толстого; Институт славяноведения РАН. Vol. 4: П (Переправа через воду) — С (Сито). М.: Межд. отношения. 2009. ISBN 978-5-7133-1312-8.
- Русанова И. П., Тимощук Б. А. (2007). Языческие святилища древних славян (in Russian). М.: Ладога-100.
- Седов, В. В. (1979). Происхождение и ранняя история славян (in Russian). М.: Наука.
- Седов, В. В. (1995). Славяне в раннем Средневековье (in Russian). М.: Институт археологии РАН.
- Археология: Учебник / под ред. В. Л. Янина (in Russian). М.: Изд-во Моск. ун-та. 2006.
- Buxton, D. R. (1934). Russian mediaeval architecture: With an account of the transcaucasian styles and their influence in the West. Cambridge: University press.
- Cracraft, J. (1988). The Petrine Revolution in Russian Architecture. Chicago; London: The University of Chicago Press. ISBN 978-0-226-11664-8.
- Weslager, C. A. (1969). The Log Cabin in America: From Pioneer Days to the Present. New Brunswick, N.J.: Rutgers University Press.
