= Ludza (disambiguation) =

Ludza is a city in Latvia.

Ludza may also refer to:

- Ludza (river)
- Ludza Municipality
- Ludza Castle
- Ludza district
- Ludza dialect
