= Lutsi =

Lutsi may refer to:

- Lutsi, Estonian name of Ludza, a city in Latvia
- Lutsi Estonians, a historic ethnic group in Latvia
- Lutsi dialect, South Estonian dialect of Latvia

== See also ==
- Luzi
