= Rundēni Parish =

Parish of Latvia

- parish of Latvia
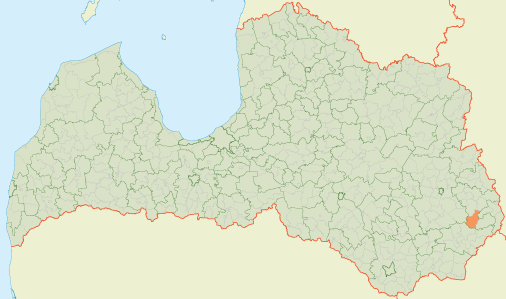
- 56°15′48″N 27°47′00″E
- Country: Latvia

Area
  - Total: 124.40 km^{2} (48.03 sq mi)
  - Land: 120.74 km^{2} (46.62 sq mi)
  - Water: 3.66 km^{2} (1.41 sq mi)

Population (1 January 2024)
  - Total: 333
  - Density: 2.7/km^{2} (6.9/sq mi)

Rundēni parish
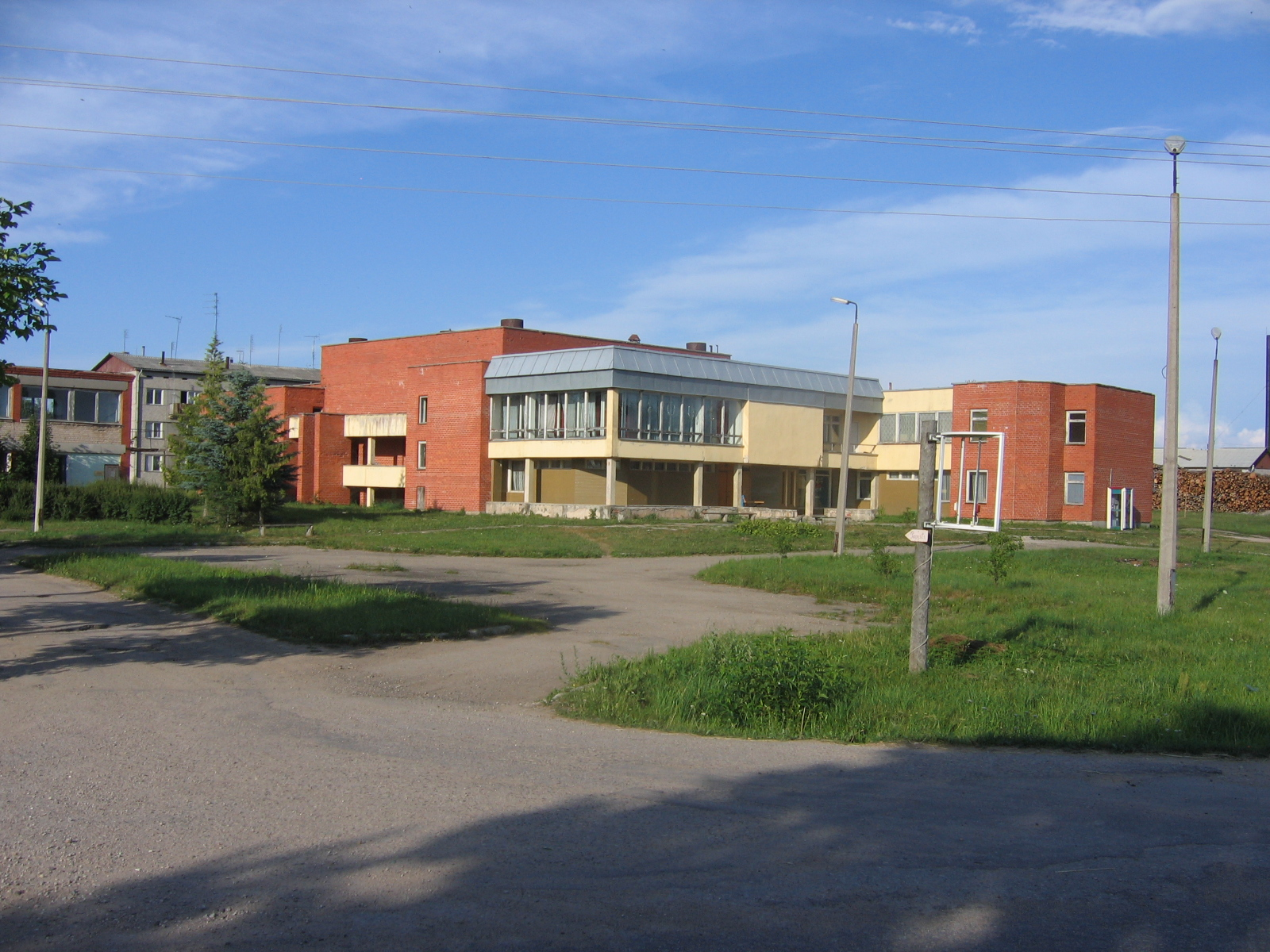
- Village of Rundēni
- Country: Latvia
- Region: Latgale
- District: Ludza district
- Administrative centre: Rundēni
- Status: from 1933
- Population: 620 (2007)
- Location: 56°16′36.3″N 27°49′34.7″E

Rundēni parish (Latvian: Rundēnu pagasts) is located in southwest Ludza Municipality in Latvia. It borders on the Pilda, Nirza, Lauderi and Istra parishes of Ludza Municipality; the Šķaune and Ezernieki parishes of Krāslava Municipality; and the Kaunata Parish of Rēzekne Municipality. It is a distance of 33 km from the village of Rundēni at the parish centre up to the municipality centre - Ludza. Up to Riga, the capital city of Latvia, it is 315 km.

== Population and national structure ==
In the Census of 2000, from a population of 800, there were 231 residents of Latvian nationality, 522 Russians, and 23 Belarusians.

== Landscape ==
Total area	The agricultural land	Woods	Infrastructure	Melioration
100.00%	47.45%	39.89%	6,70%	5,96%
12466,5 ha	5915.9 ha	4972,7 ha	835,1 ha	742.8 ha

Rundēni parish is located on the height of Latgale. Most of the parish is covered by the hills of Razna, and in the south-east by hills of Dagda. The highest part of Rundēni parish is the northern part, which forms a watershed between the rivers Daugava and Velikaya (basin of Lake Pskov). The western part of the parish is close to the massif of Lielais Liepukalns. The highest hills are Pentjušu Hill, and hills to the north at Kovaļiški, Sūnupļava and Rudzīši. The biggest lake is Lake Bižas. Smaller lakes include Bezersļesjes, Aunejas, Testečkovas, Kazeņa and Rudzīšu. The Saryanka River, a tributary of the Daugava, flows through the parish. Other small rivers of the parish are the Kazeņa, Siņica, Volčica, Vonogupīte.

== Villages and populated places ==
The centre of the parish is the village of Rundēni. Other populated places include:

- Adelinova
- Barsuki
- Bezlesje
- Bļižņeva
- Bori
- Bojari
- Briževa
- Bubinova
- Čuhnova
- Dvorišče
- Devjatņiki
- Drozdovka
- Dzenegaļi
- Gorodoks
- Greidani
- Griņkova
- Homutova
- Kabilovka
- Kazeņa
- Kazici
- Kannova
- Kļeščeva
- Klumstova
- Kovaļiški
- Ksaverina
- Labunščina
- Lielā Maļinovka
- Lisova
- Loborži
- Losiški
- Mazkrinica
- Maļinovka
- Mačuļi
- Mežavēpri
- Nalogi
- Noviņi
- Noviydvors
- Opši
- Osova
- Ostrova
- Pakalni
- Pentjuši
- Pereļji
- Pešleva
- Posiški
- Punculova
- Pušča
- Rocova
- Rudzīši
- Ruleva
- Rusecki
- Sarja
- Savina
- Stankeviči
- Strukaļi
- Sūnupļava
- Tarčilova
- Tartaks
- Tereneva
- Testečkova
- Škorlupova
- Yačmenišče
- Vertulova
- Zamostje
- Zarečje
- Zirgi
- Zubova
- Žubuļi

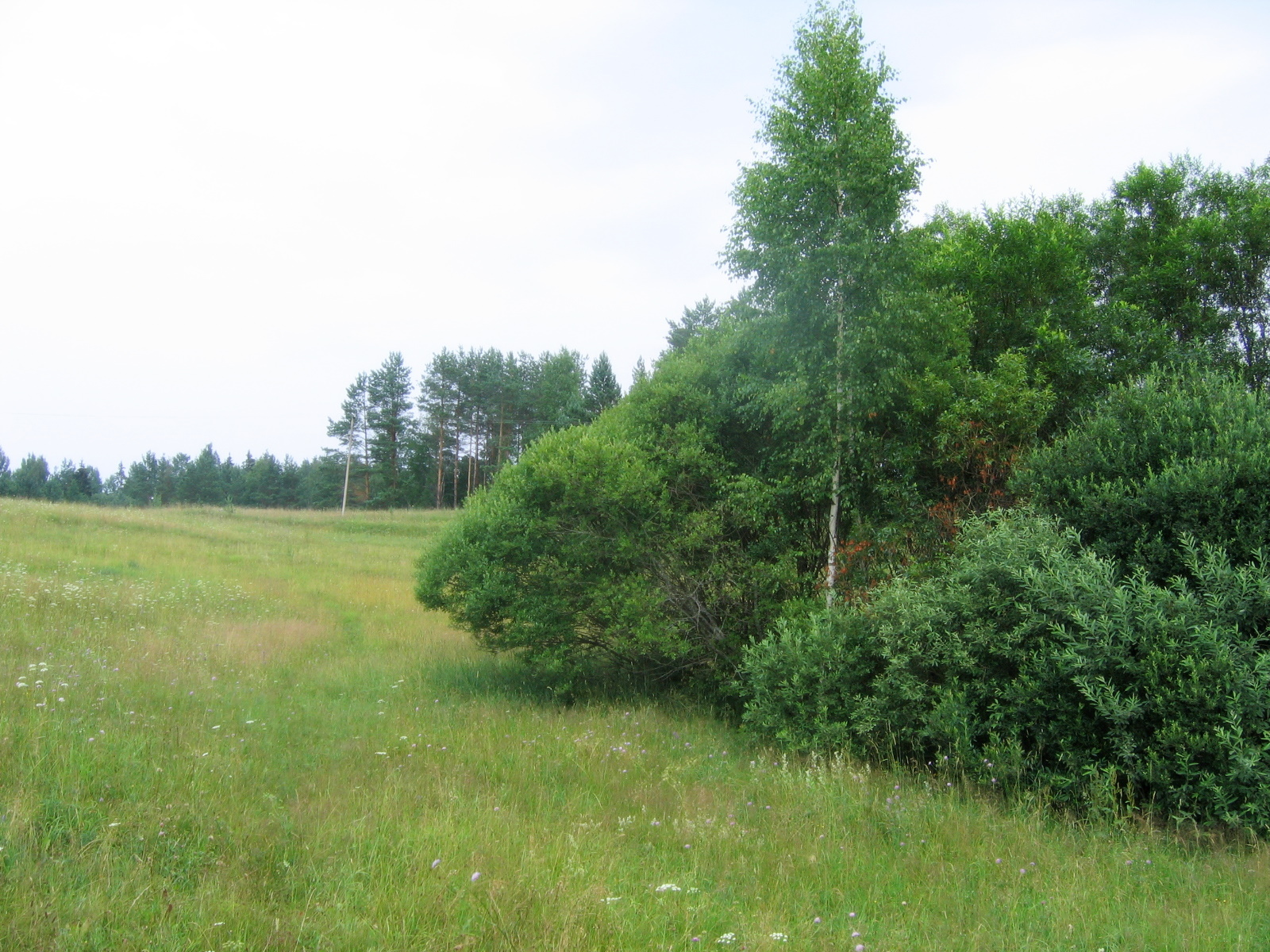
Stankeviči

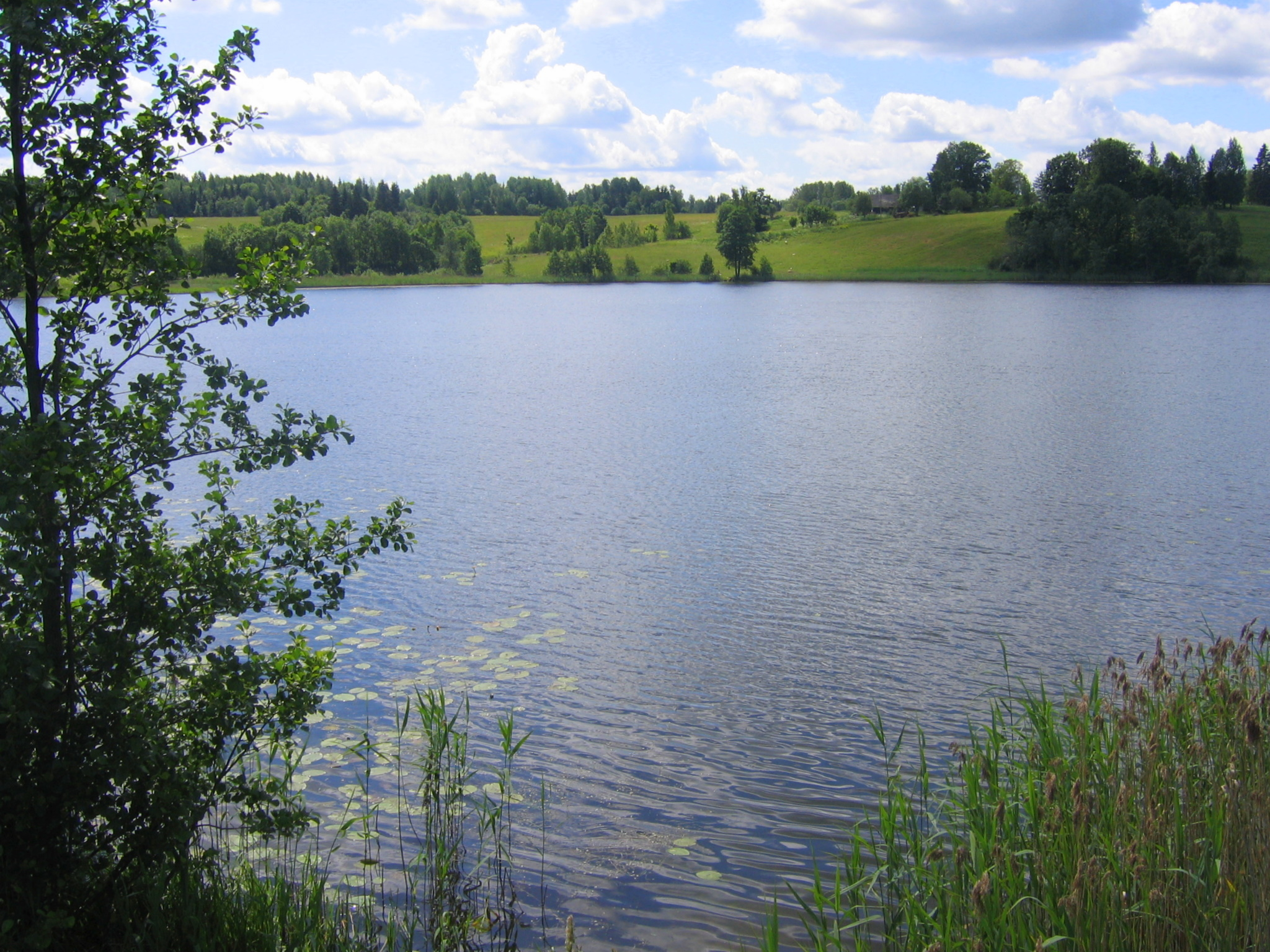
Pakalni

== History ==
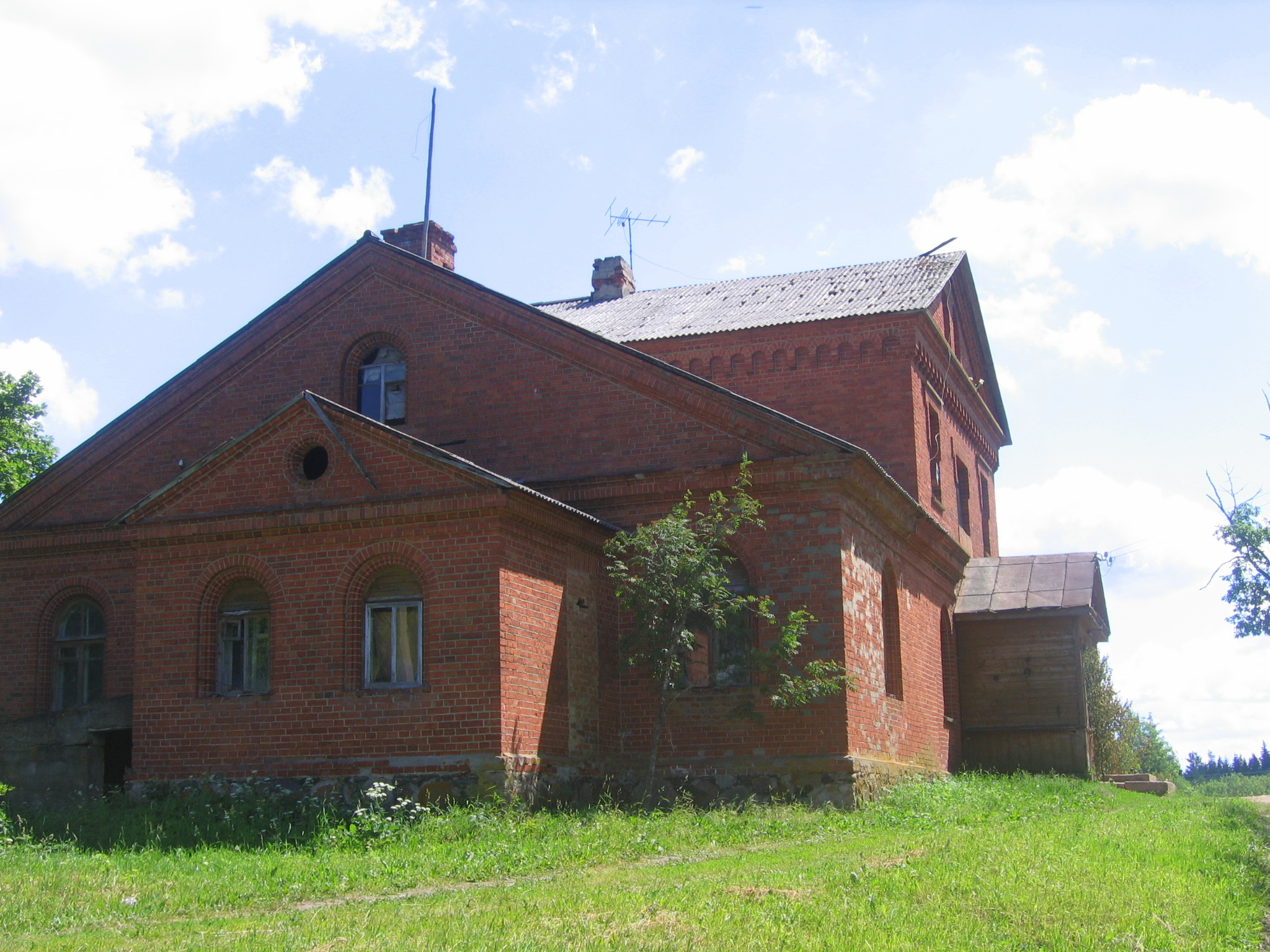
Pakalnu Manor House

Early in its history, the parish included the manors Rundēni, Viktorinavas un Bišu and smaller half-manors Zuranpole, Čuhnova, and Lielā Kriņņica un Zaķu. During an agrarian reform, the manors were divided into land lots. The Pakalnu manor house is a private property, its architectural style is [[neo-romanticism]] and park of Rundēni manor. Until 1938 there were schools: in Ruleva, Drozdovka, Rudzīši, Pakalni, Vertulova and Rundēni. In 1939, the Rundēni secondary school was constructed. In 1920-1930, a rural community, some companies are formed: agricultural, credit-savings and cattle breeding. There were two flour mills, a dairy, twelve grocery shops, two bakeries, shop of wine and vodka, and also a shop and manufacturer and leather products. During the Soviet era, the state farm at Rundēni was the largest in Ludza district.

== Showplaces ==
=== Places of worship ===
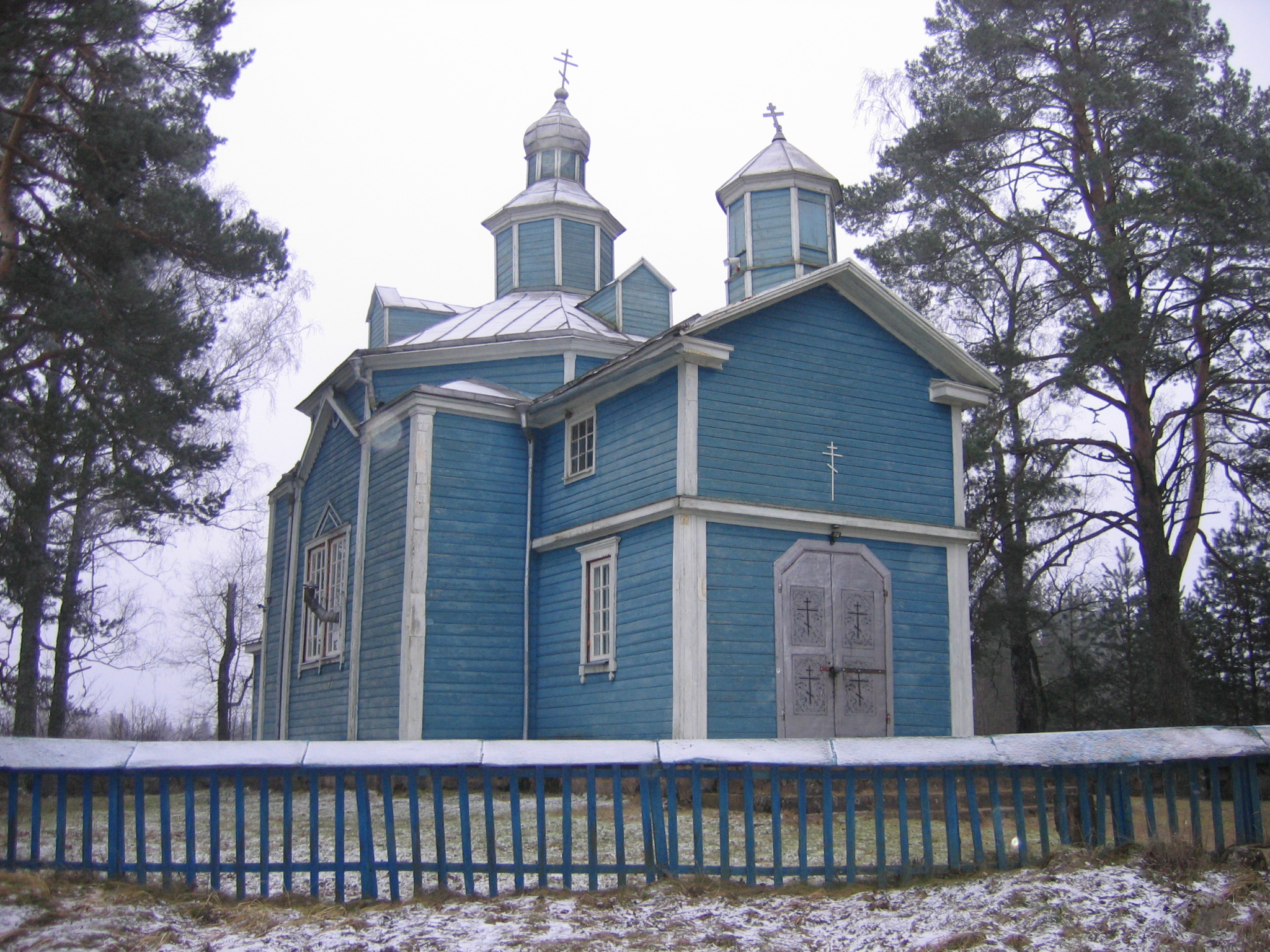
Vertulova Church in winter

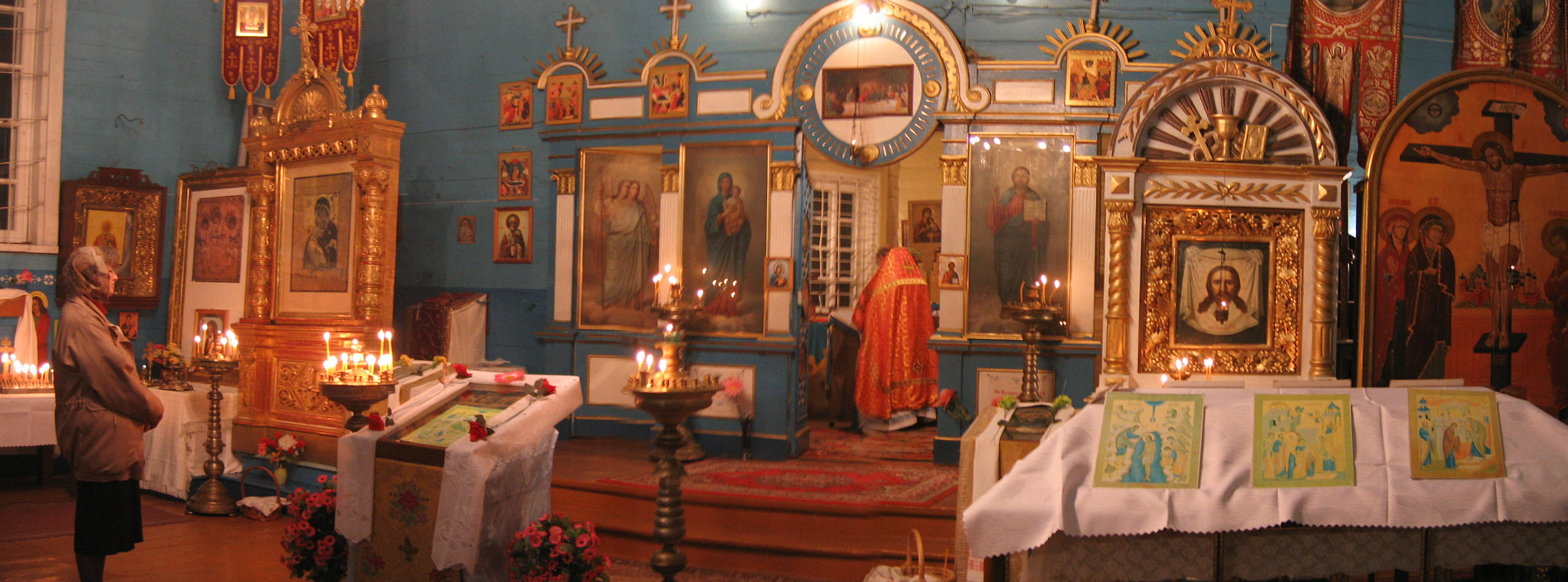
Vertulova Church Interior

- The Roman Catholic Church of Christ's Ascension in Rundēni
- The Orthodox Church of Birth of Our Lady in Vertulova
- The Orthodox Old Believers’ Church Chapels: Bližņeva and Bori.

=== Protected archaeological and cultural monuments ===
Denomination	Location
Medieval cemetery of Vertulova	Vertulova
Gorodoks ancient hill fort I (Gorelaya hill, Gorodoks)	Gorodoks
Gorodoks ancient hill fort II (Krutaya hill, Kostyolnaya hill)	Gorodoks
Ancient burial ground in Zirgi	Zirgi
Ancient burial ground and the Bull-stone in Kazici	Kazici
Ancient burial ground in Pešļeva	Pešļeva
Ancient burial ground and settlement in Pentjuši	Pentjuši
Ancient burial ground in Tereņeva	Between Tereņeva and Kannova

=== Natural monuments ===
The Bull-stone in Kazici is a big, ancient cult stone of the Baltic tribes. 5.3 m (17 ft) long, 3.5 m (11 ft) wide and 1.8 m (5.9 ft) tall. The Bull-stone may have served to designate an ancient border. According to local legends, when the stone is touched it will take away ailments and give energy.

Rundēni Devil’s Pits is a natural monument covering 3 hectares (7.4 acres) at Height of Latgale, 3–4 km (1.9–2.5 miles) north-east of Rundēni near the Rundēni-Lauderi road. Since 1997, the Devil's Pits are a protected geomorphological object and are unique in the Baltic states. There are five pits of an unknown origin; one is filled with water and the others with raspberry bushes. The pits may have been caused by a meteorite or may be karstic formations.

=== Sculptural monuments and installations ===
- The Hill of Crosses
- Memorial complex in Sūnupļava

The memorial ensemble was created in memory of eleven heroes of different nationalities from World War II, on Height of Sūnupļava (Height 144). It is on the side of the Rundēni-Lauderi road. The memorial ensemble is created from greater boulders (author A. Dripe).
