= Rundēni =

Village in Latvia

- Interactive map of Rundēni
- Country: Latvia
- Region: Latgale
- Municipality: Ludza
- Parish: Rundēni

Area
  - Total: 124,665 ha (308,050 acres)

Population
  - Estimate (2007): 500

Rundēni or Rundāni is a village in Rundēni Parish, Ludza Municipality in the Latgale region of Latvia. It is the center of Rundēni Parish. In the village converge roads from six villages Zirgi, Kaunata, Lauderi, Vecsloboda, Raypole, and Sapožņiki.

== History ==
Rundēni got its name from latgalian words 'creek' and 'hot water'. In 1933, it acquired the status of village, and two years later 38 houses were built.

Population	1935	1940	1989	2000	2007
People	288	~4000	445	401	~500

== Economic activities ==
In the centre of Rundēni are school (not working from 2007), pre-school educational institution, dispensary, a library (there is access to the Internet), the People's house (club), post office, two shops. There is a bus stop - Rundēni. By public transport (bus) it is possible to reach the populated places: Ludza, Zirgi, Pakalni, Kovaļiški, Borisova, Brodaiža, Gajeva, Pilda, Ņukši, Listaki, Martiši, Konecpole, Lazari, Vecsloboda, Soboļina, Šakuri, Lauderi, Skredeli, Ploski, Zilupe, Brigi, Pikava, Skriņi, Bobiši, Istalsna, Mežavepri, Dzenigaļi, Vertulova, Seiļi, Raipole, Nirza, Horoševa, Gorbi, Pildagreči.

== Showplaces ==
=== Hill of Crosses ===
In 2000, a resident of Rundēni Janis Alnis (known Latvian specialist of missile construction, professor of Riga Polytechnic Institute) cleared the local hill from the garbage. In age-old days on this hill there was the Catholic Church constructed by monks-Dominicans. During up to 2007 on the Hill have been set crosses of various forms and beliefs, constructions with Runes inscriptions, a huge boulder on which the Cross made by the nature is represented. Many flowers and plants are planted. In the centre at Hill is The Cross, made from oak, whose age is 700 years. At the top of a Hill is located The Bell-Tower, in which instead of a bell - part of the tractor-trailer.

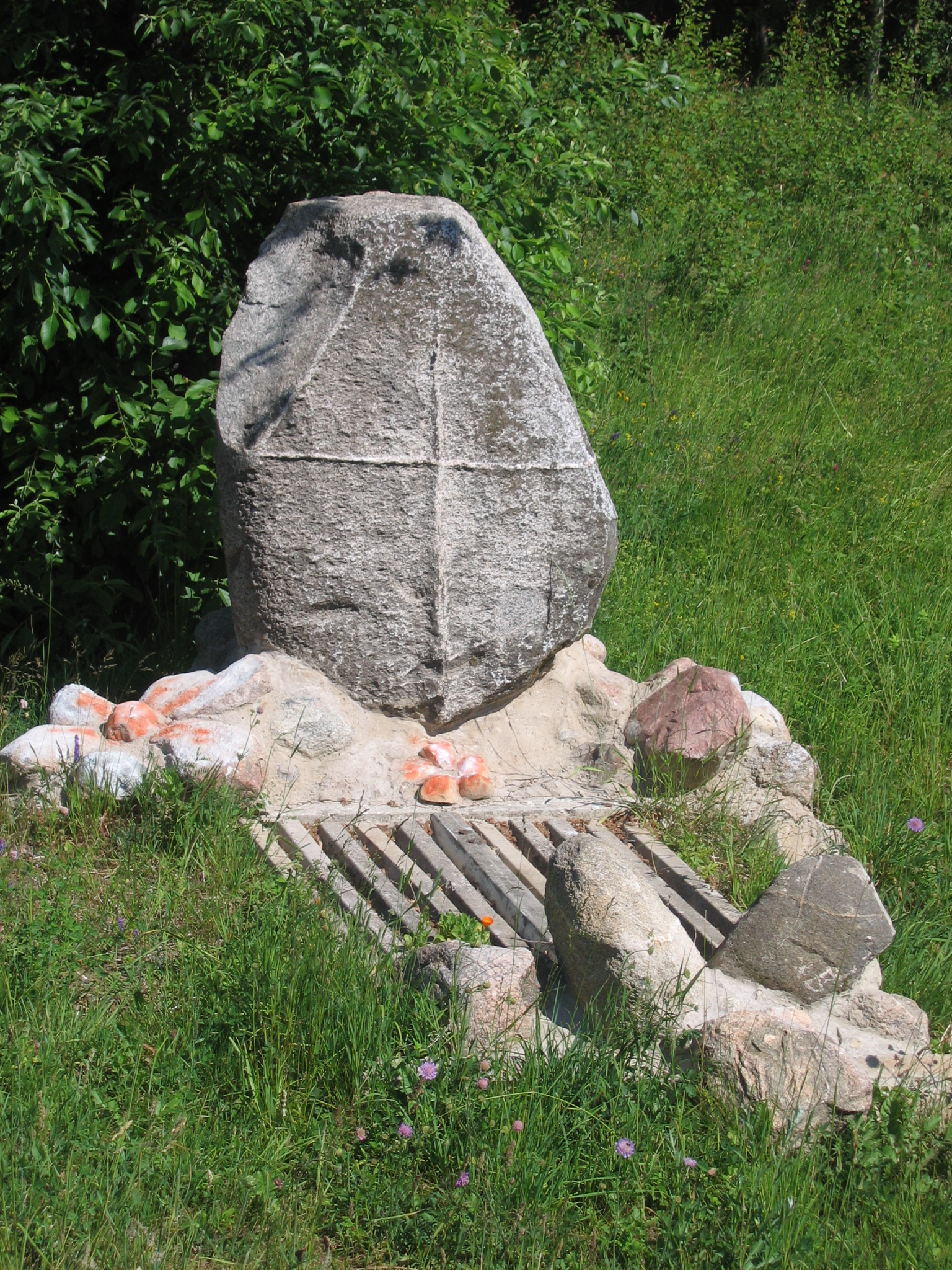

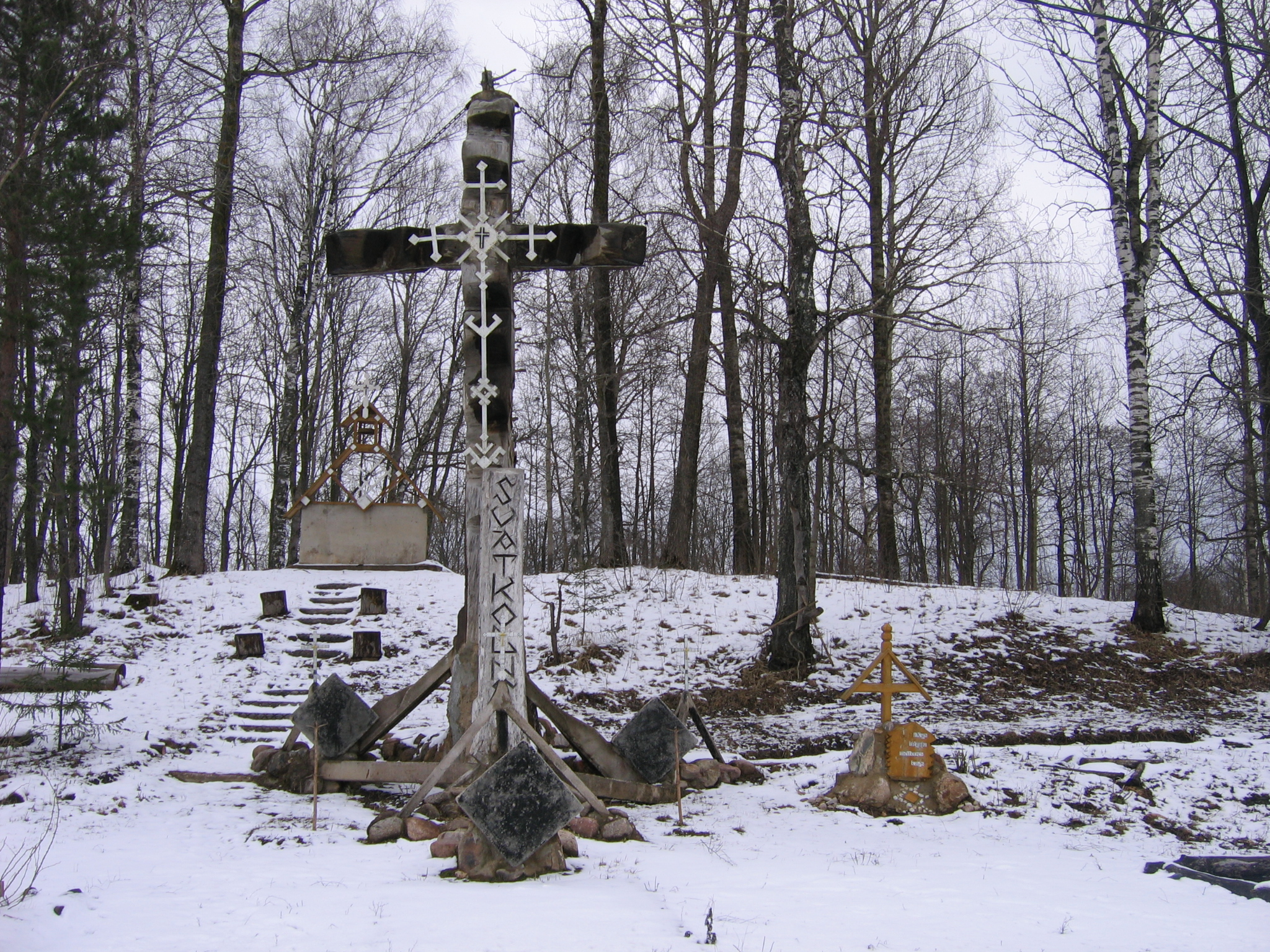

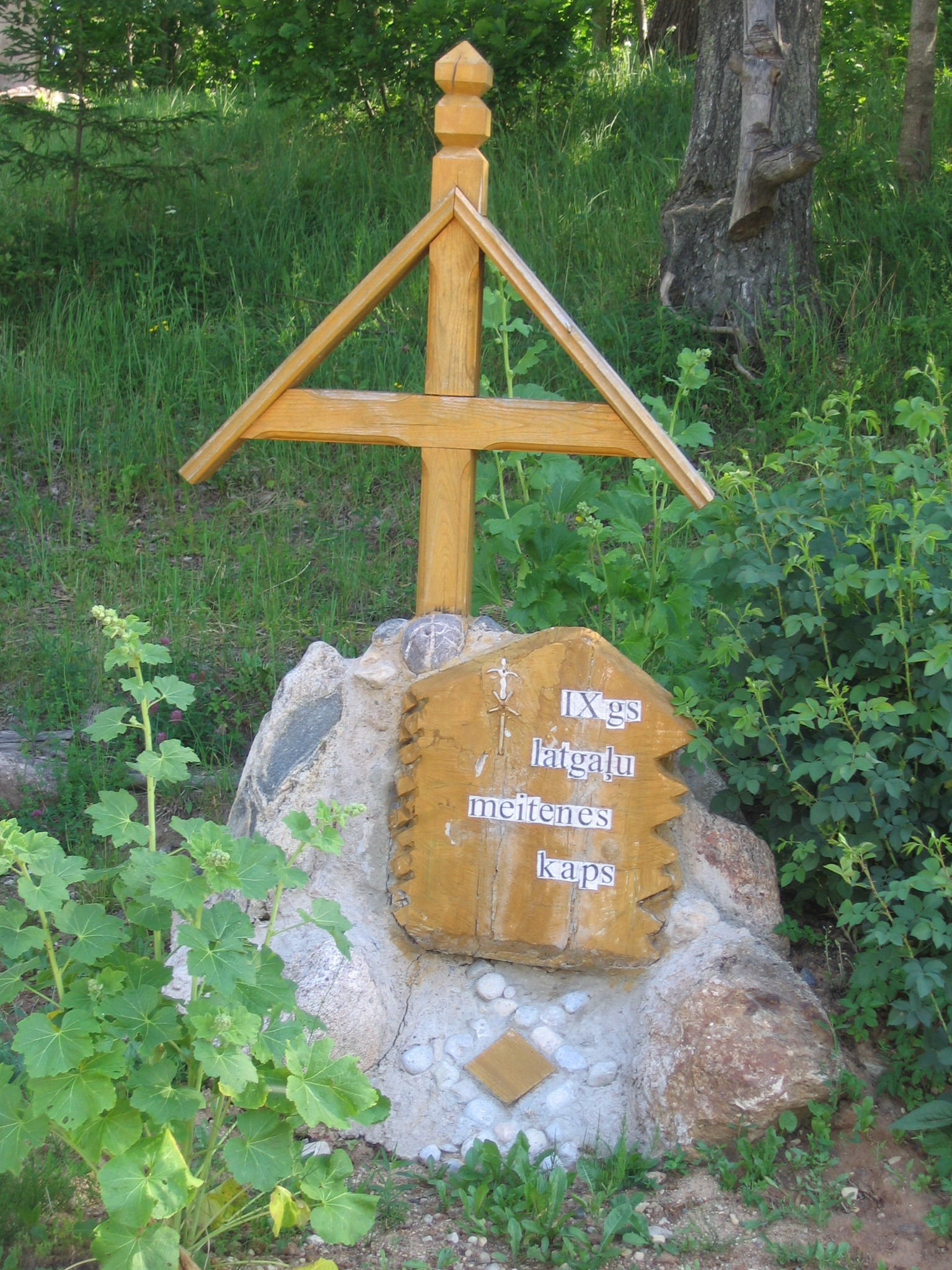

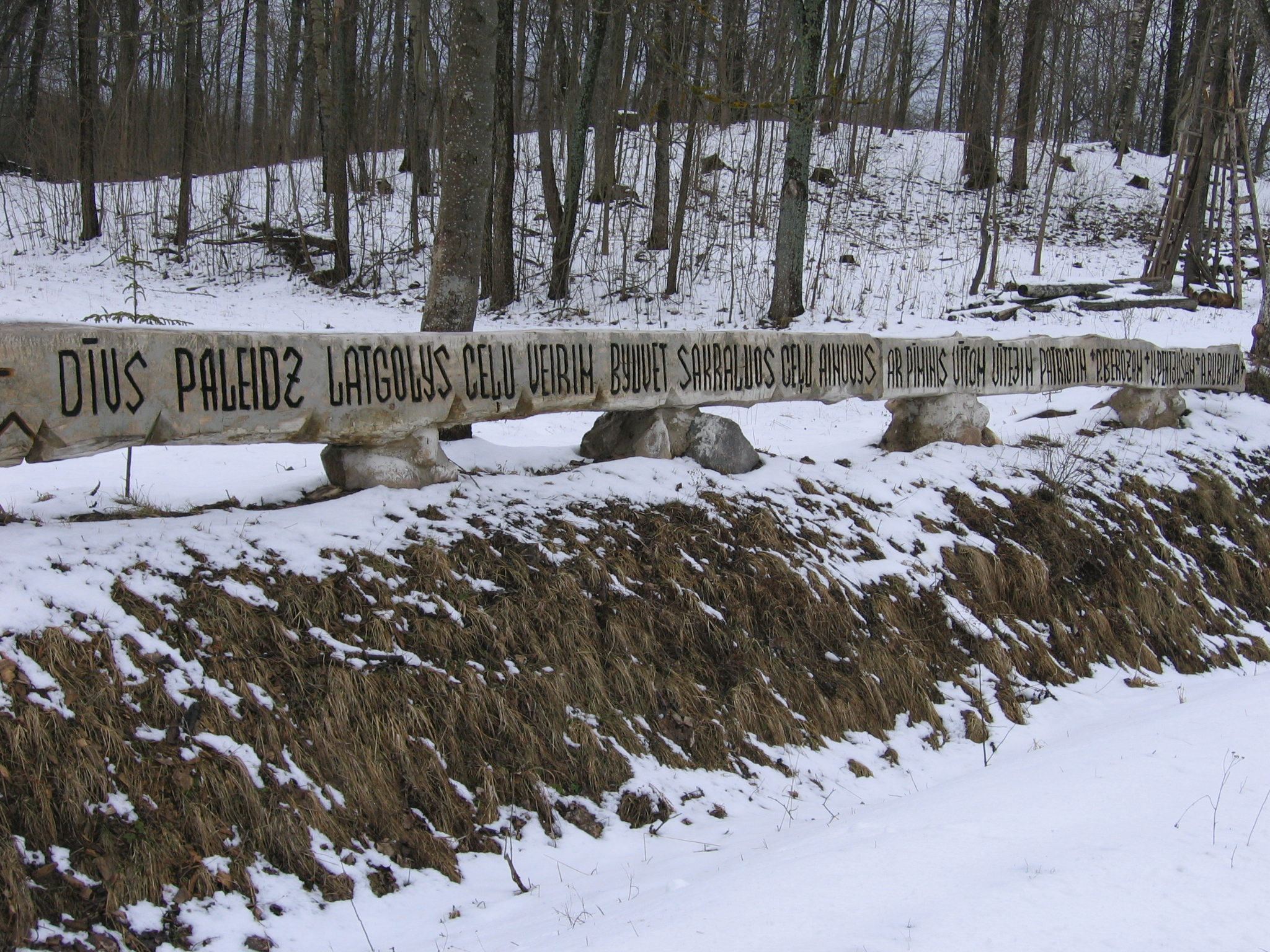

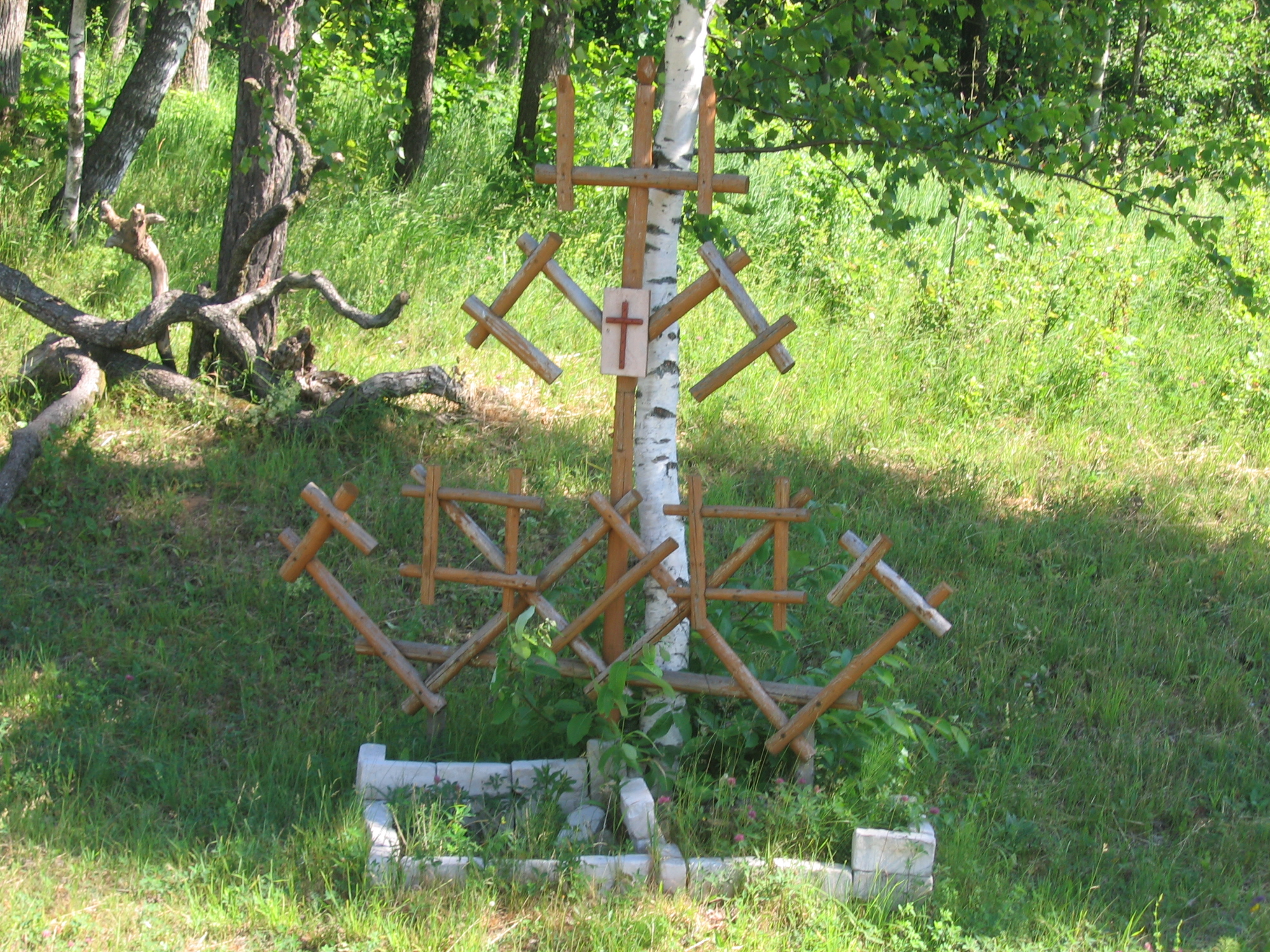

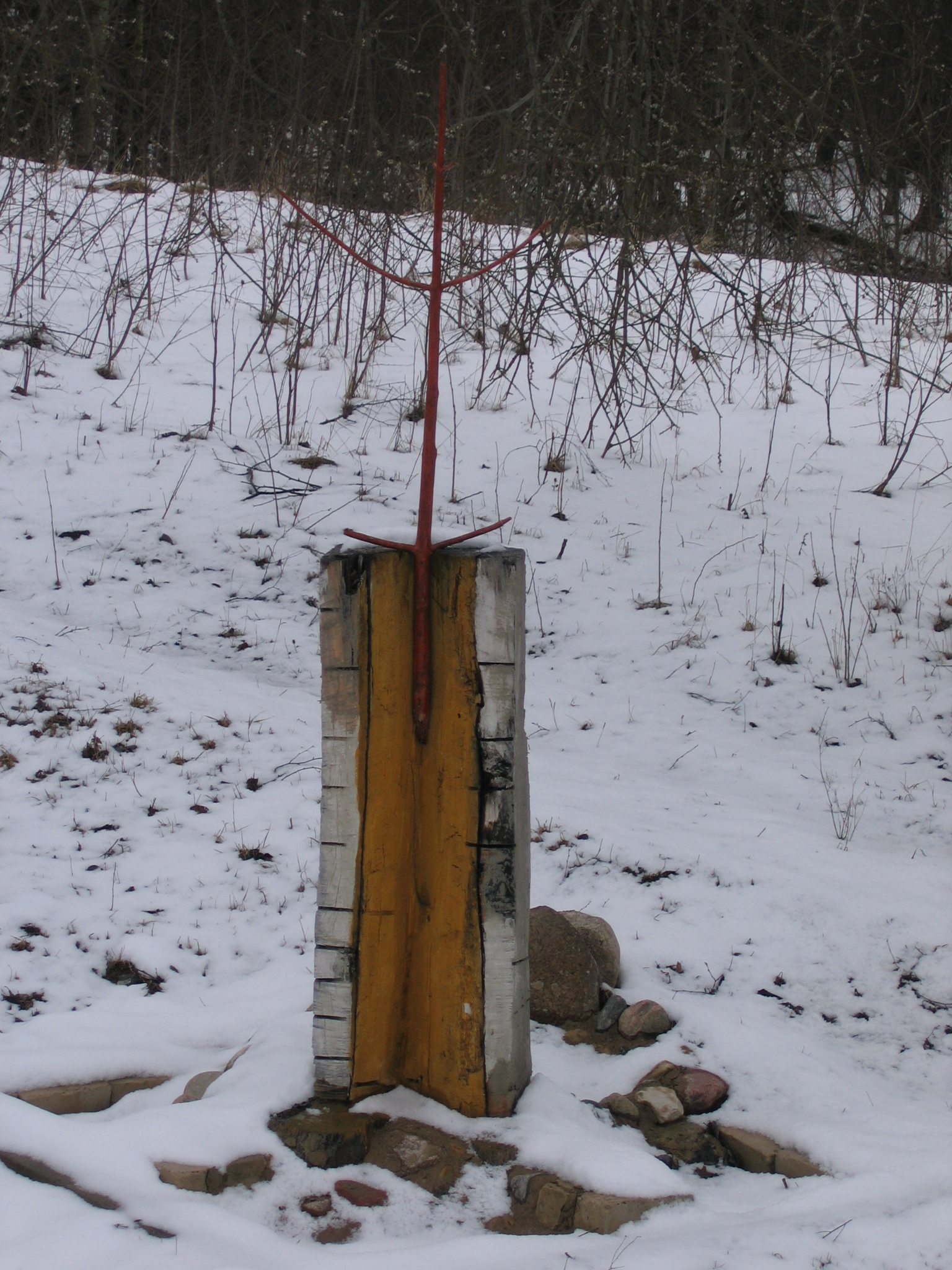

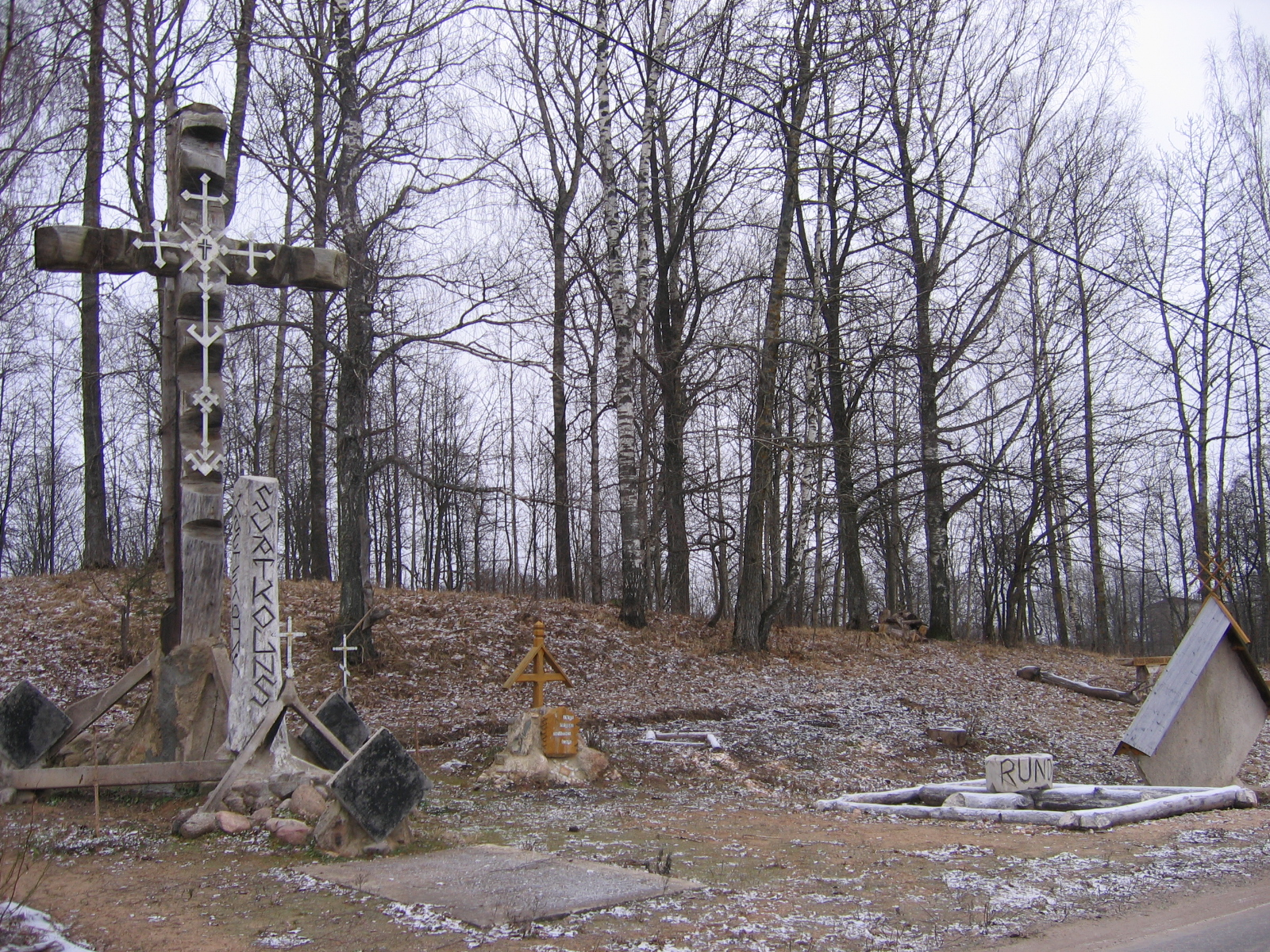

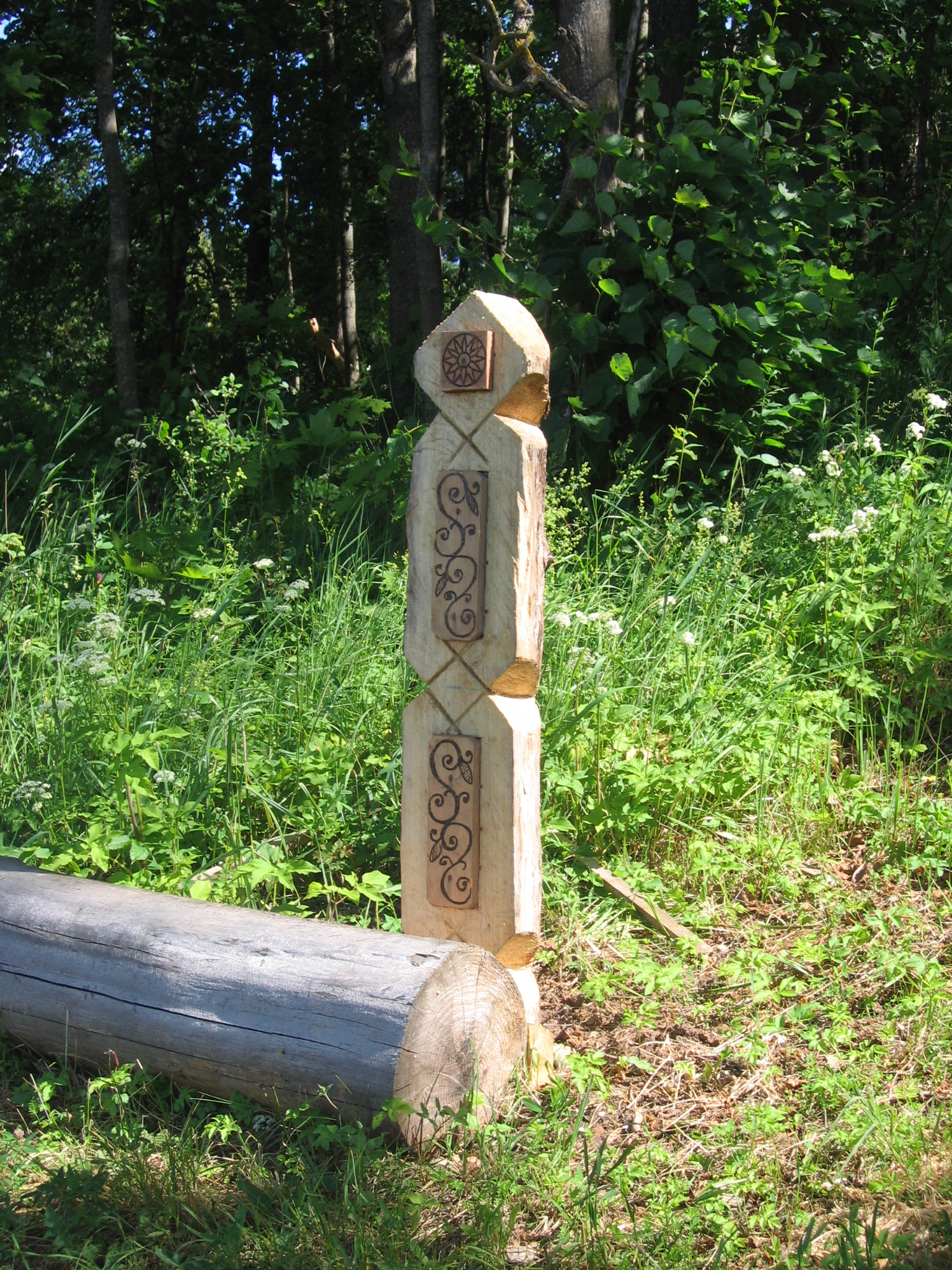

=== The Roman Catholic Church of Christ's Ascension in Rundēni ===
The church is located at the heart of Rundēni - opposite the bus stop, and was built without towers. There is a separately standing small bell-tower with two bells. An iron fencing on the stone basis fences the church and bell-tower. Local landowner Andrey Shahno constructed the church about 1820. Inside the church is a crypt, in which was buried the family of landowner Victor Shahno - descendant of Andrei Shahno. Victor Shahno himself had emigrated abroad during the Second World War. Until 1946 the crypt was available for visitors, but later was closed to prevent looting.

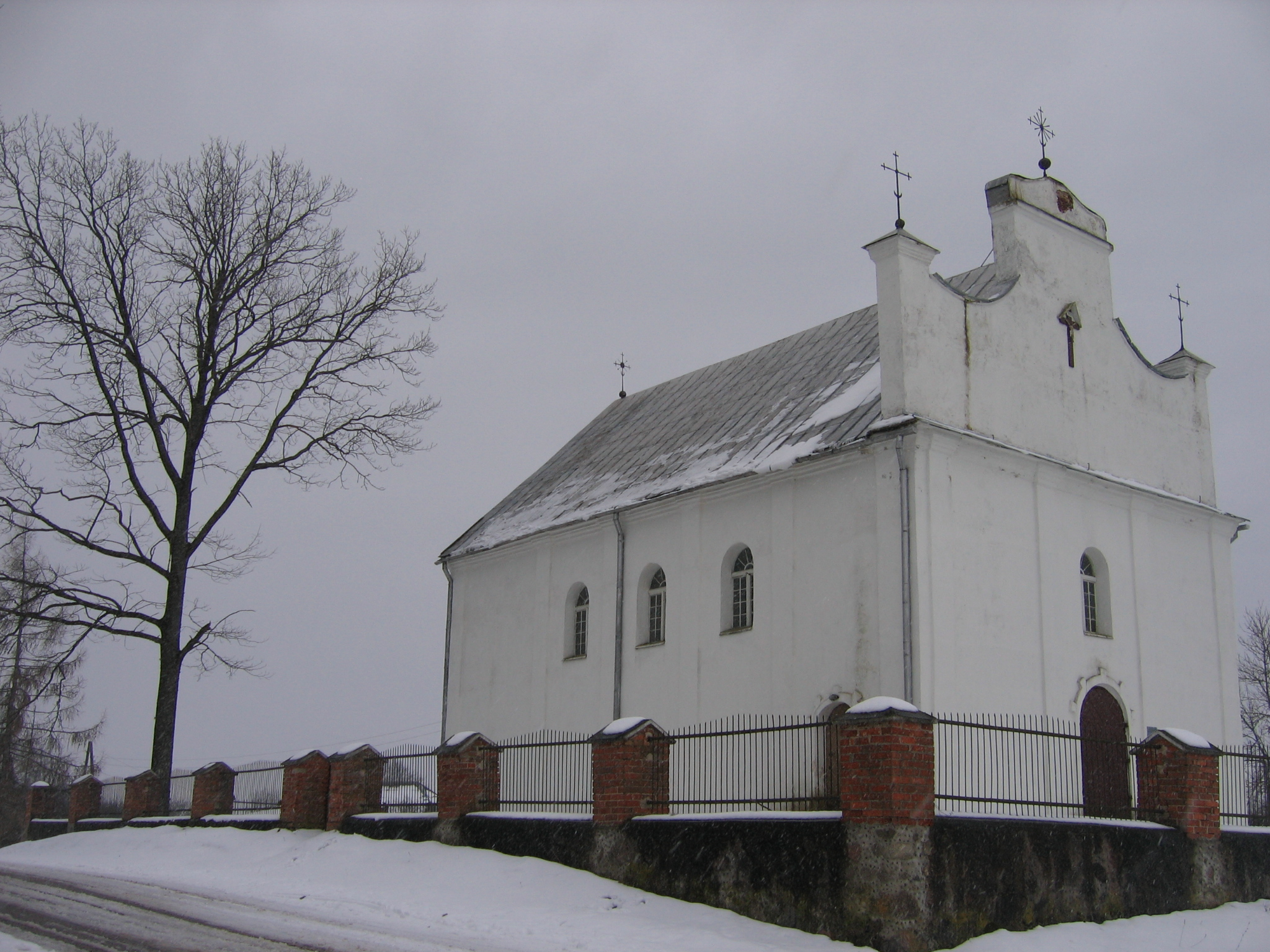

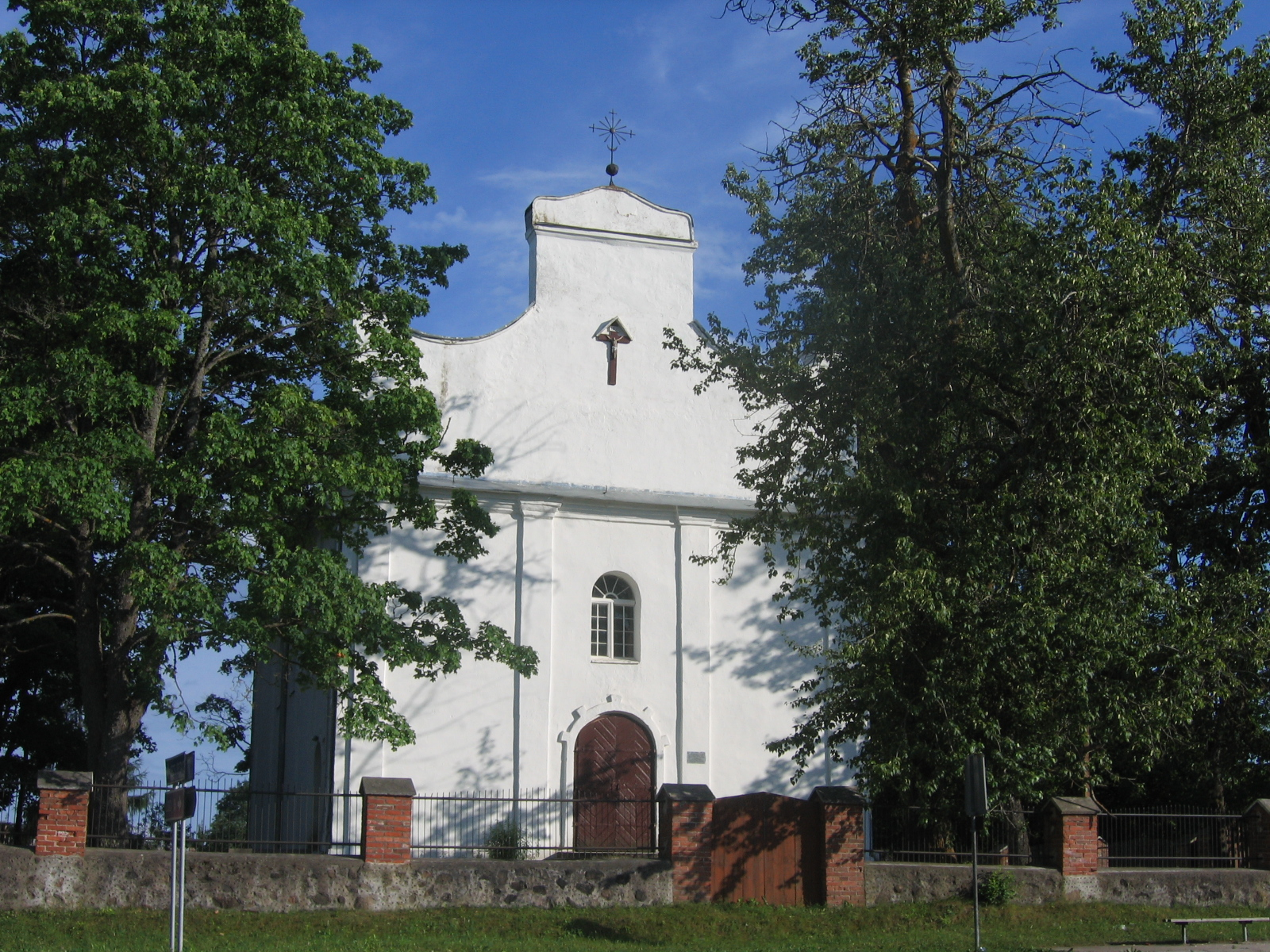

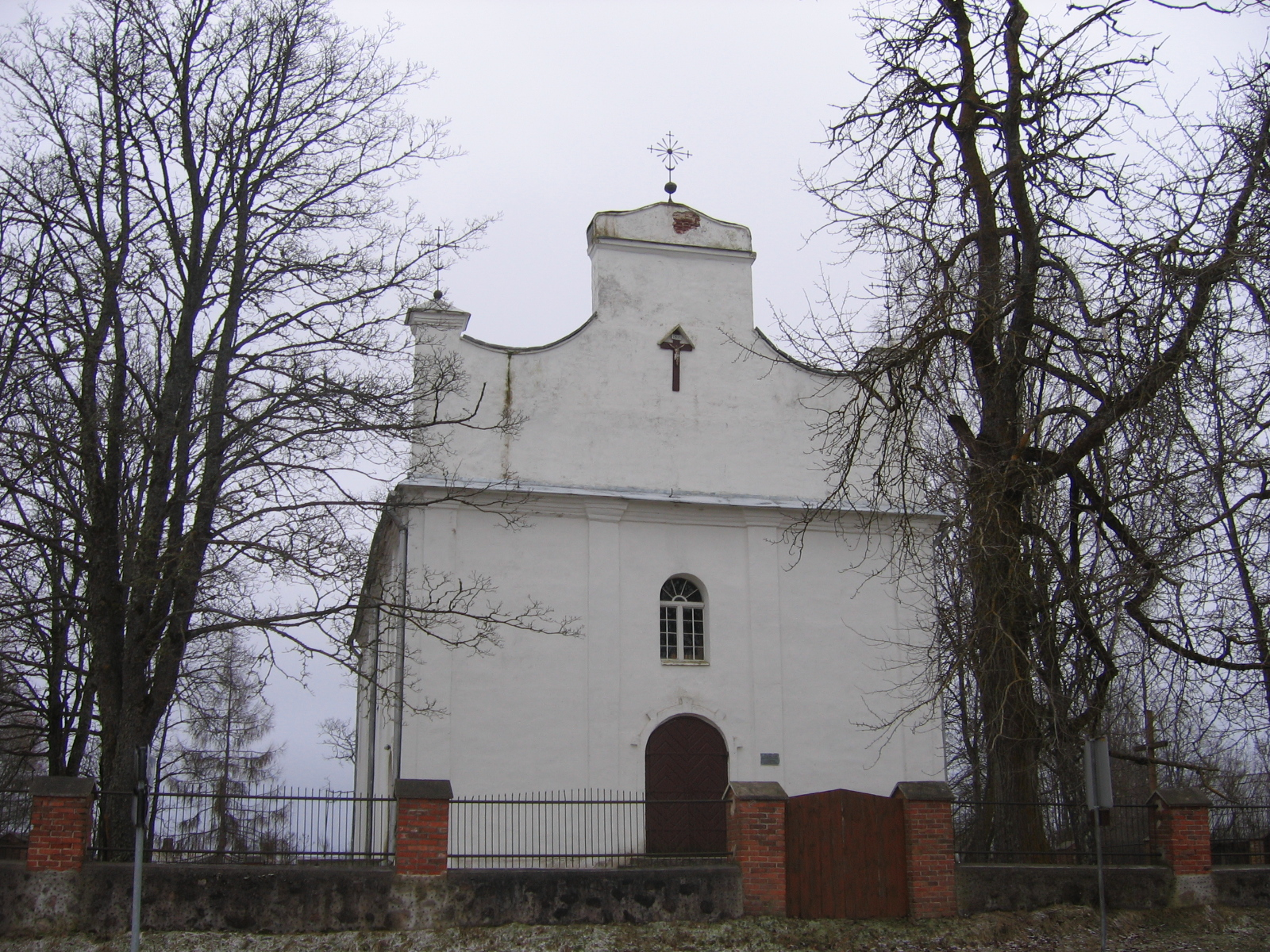

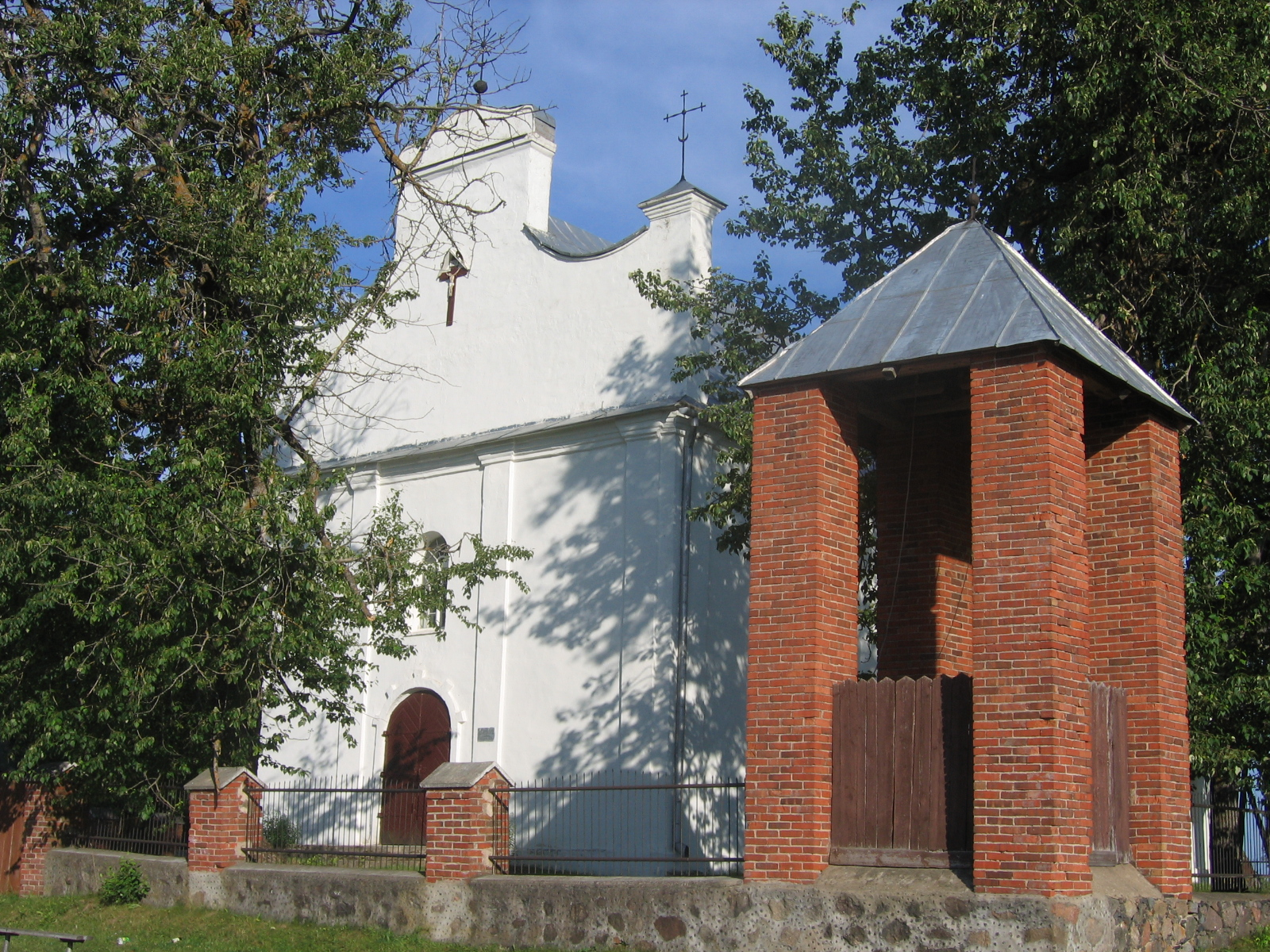

=== Rundēnu school building ===
Rundēnu School building is located on the territory of the manor, whose owner was Polish landowner Victor Shahno. Now on a place of Rundēnu Manor is only a park. In park of the manor the landowner has planted two malls of trees - on the one hand - lindens' mall, on another - fir-trees' mall. Lindens’ mall is kept and up to now. Fir-trees’ mall has been cut down for building needs during the Second World War. At this time inside the manor is located the school complex. In 1938, construction of a new building of secondary school has begun. Future school director Arthur Burtnieks headed building construction. The school was built by hand, without technique help. In 1939 has opened the doors the spacious three-storey building of school. Now the building of school is empty - in 2007 was last school release.

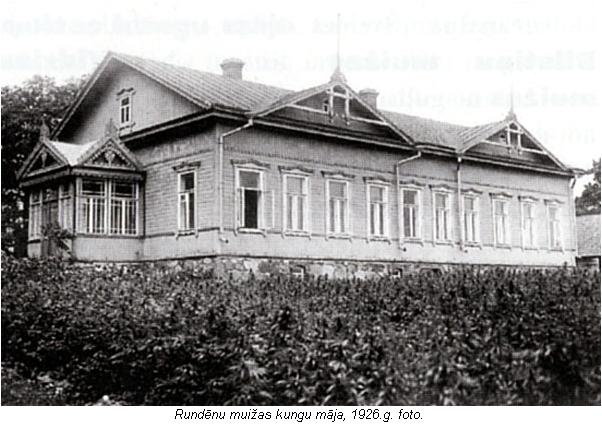
Rundēnu Manor house

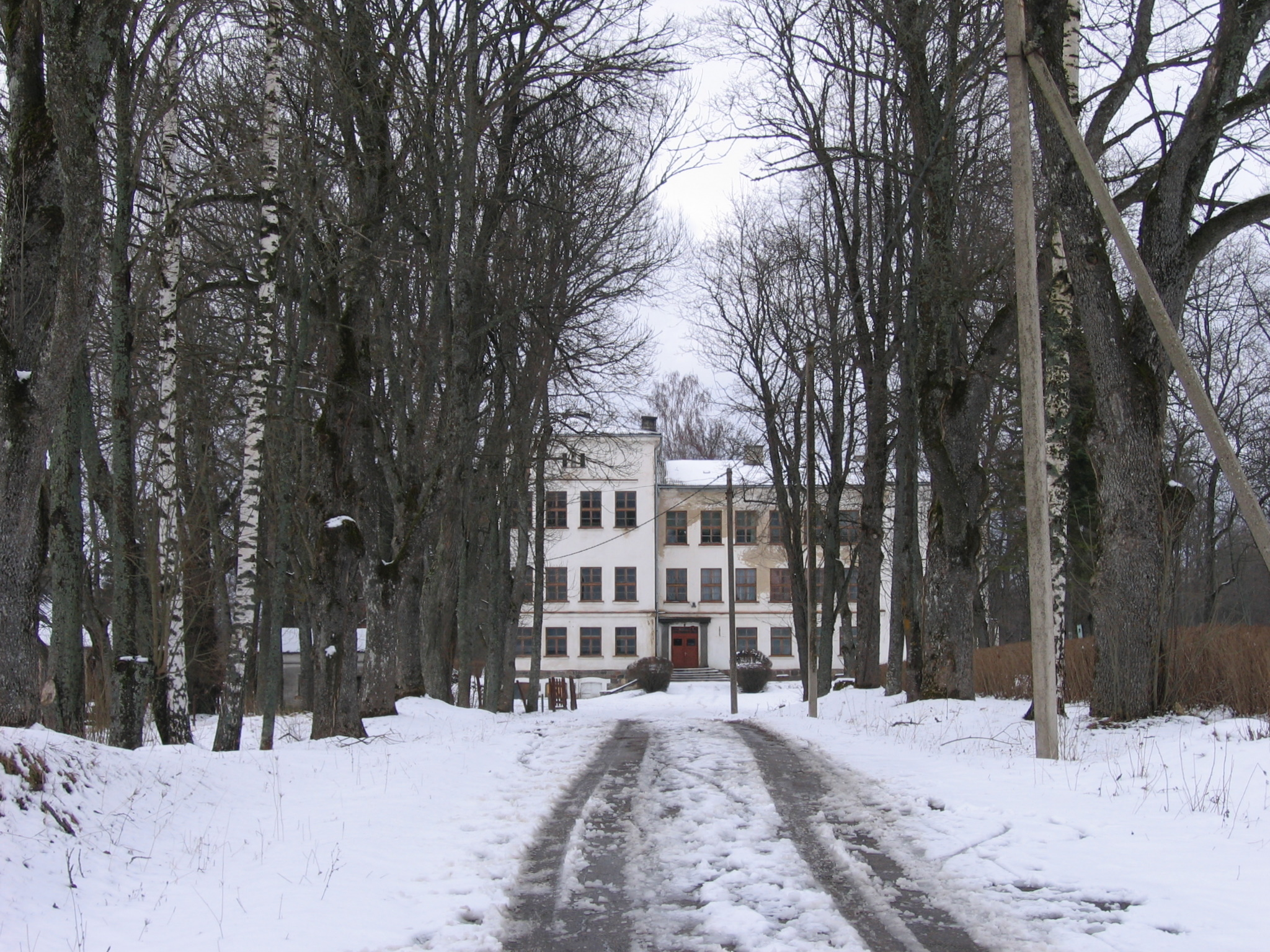
Road to school in winter

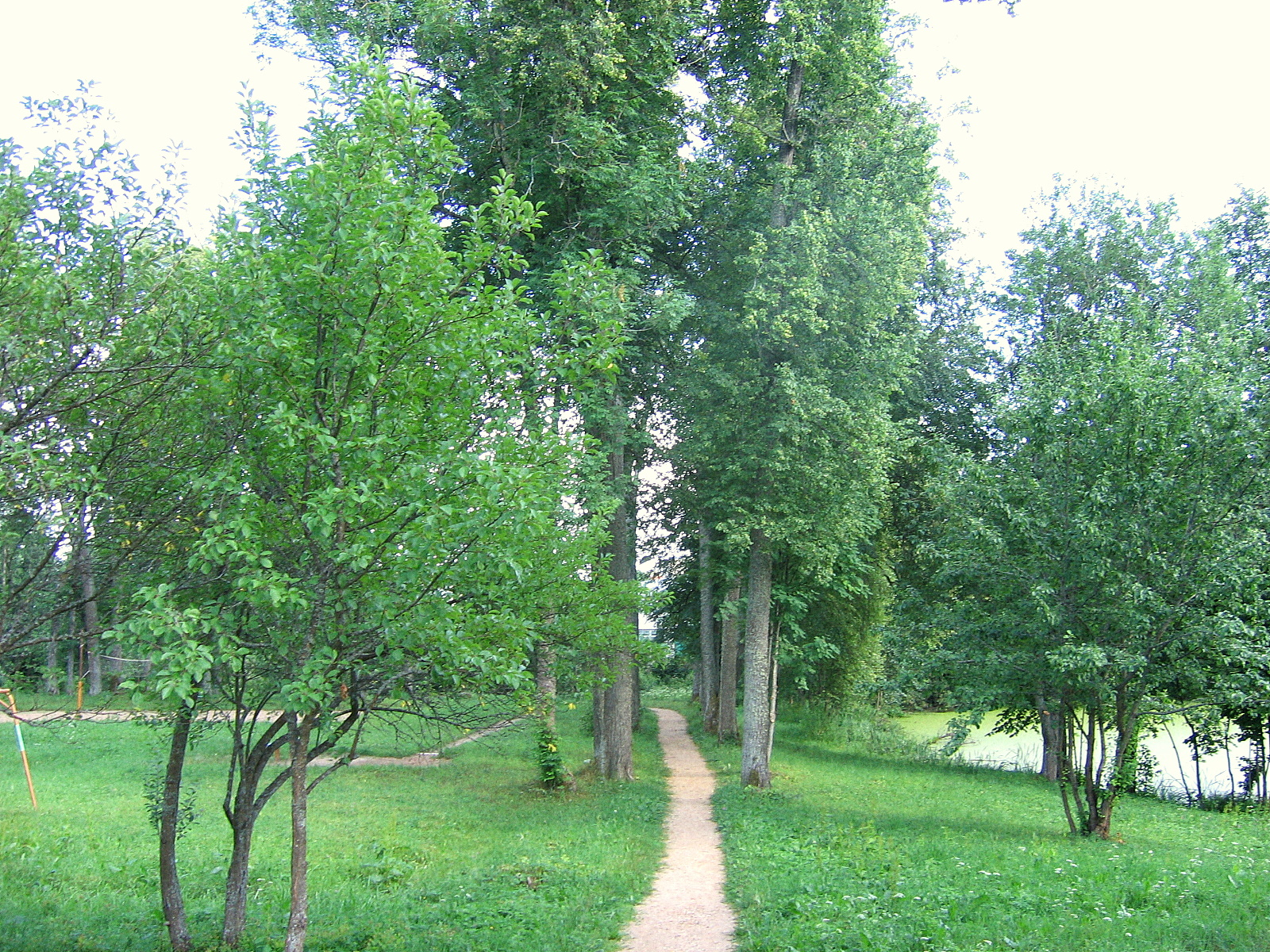
Lindens’ mall near school

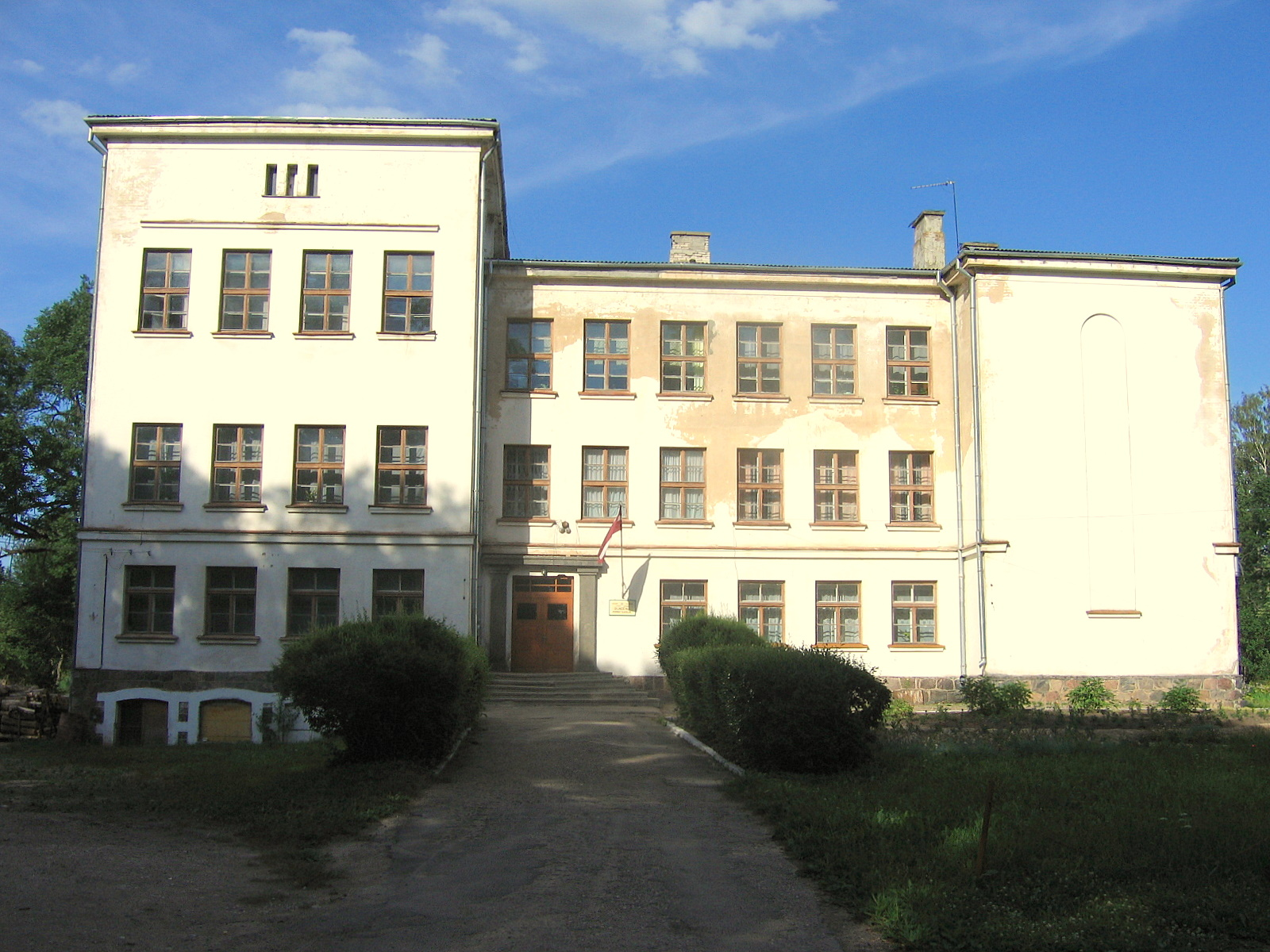
School building

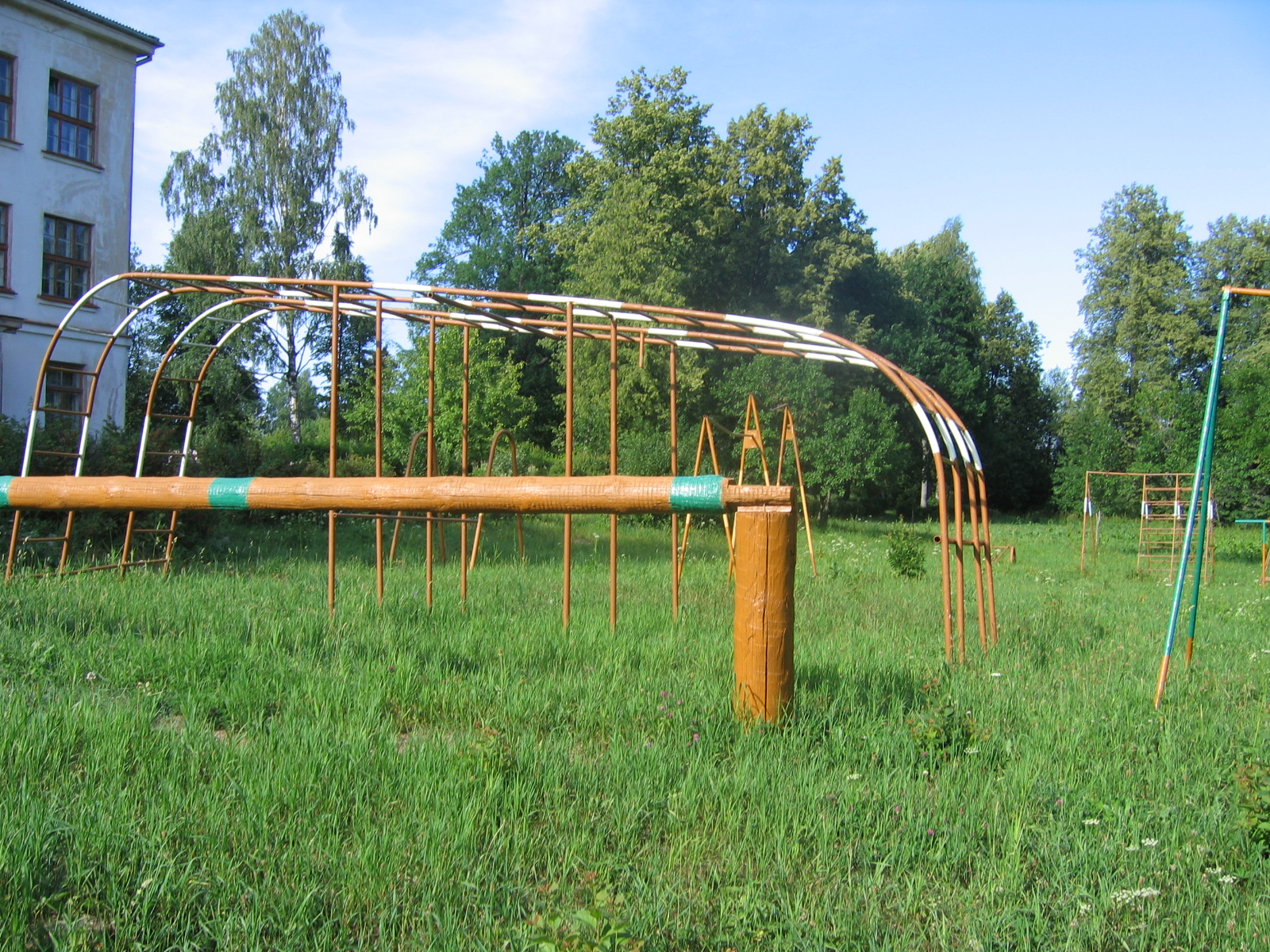
Near Rundenu school
