= Ludza Estonians =

Ethnic group in Latvia

Lutsi maarahvas
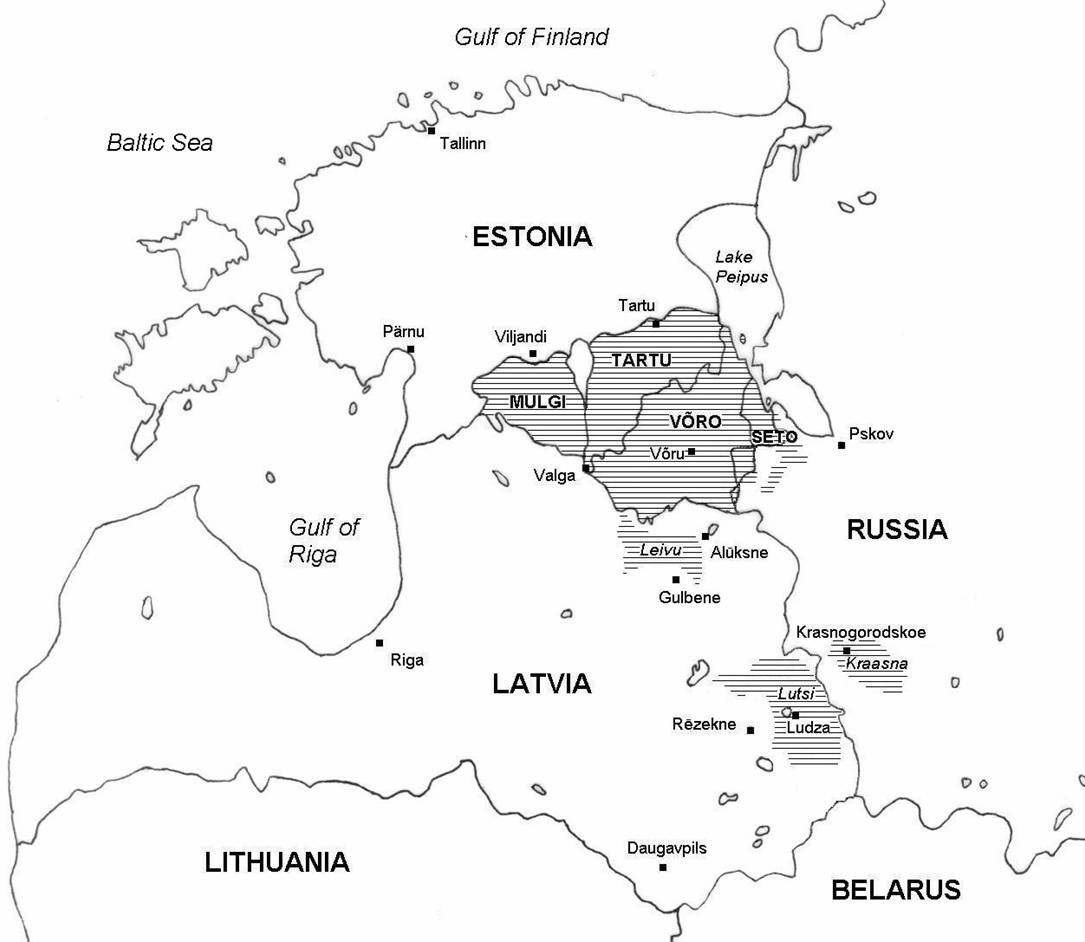
- Southern Estonian language area, Ludza Estonians in eastern corner of Latvia

Total population
- Unknown but people from the Ludza area often acknowledge Ludza ancestry

Regions with significant populations
- Latvia

Languages
- Ludza (historically), Latvian

Religion
- Catholic

Related ethnic groups
- other Baltic Finns

The Ludza Estonians (Estonian: lutsi maarahvas, "Lutsi country folk"; Latvian: ludzas igauņi) are a South Estonian-speaking community of Latgale in south-eastern Latvia. Before World War II they were settled in some 53 villages across the four rural parishes (pagasti) of Pilda, Nirza, Brigi (until 1925 Janovole) and Mērdzene (until 1925 Mihalova), all surrounding the town of Ludza. Their language, the Lutsi dialect, belongs to the same family as Võro and Seto but developed in isolation for several centuries. The last fluent speaker died in 2006 and the last person with substantial passive knowledge died in 2014.

== History ==
The origin of the Lutsi community is not settled. Two recurring hypotheses in the scholarly literature hold that the ancestors of the Lutsi were either refugees from the Great Northern War (1700–1721), or Catholic Estonians who left south-eastern Estonia during the 17th century to avoid the religious policies of the Protestant Swedish Empire. An older Estonian-language tradition holds that the ancestors were brought into the area as serfs in the 18th century. Linguistic distance between Lutsi and its nearest South Estonian relatives suggests several centuries of independent development, while 19th-century land deeds collected during recent fieldwork show that some families settled only in the latter half of the 19th century — pointing to multiple waves of migration rather than a single event.

Unlike most Estonian speakers, the Lutsi were Roman Catholic, in keeping with the Catholic tradition of Latgale under the Polish–Lithuanian Commonwealth, to which Polish Livonia belonged until 1772. Through the period of serfdom the community remained culturally distinct and largely confined to its home parishes. Catholic services and confession were conducted in Lutsi until parish life was Latvianised, reducing everyday contact with Latvian, Belarusian and Russian outside neighbouring villages; Polish was heard mainly on the manors, having been the administrative language of Polish Livonia.

== Language ==
Lutsi is a South Estonian language island, most closely related to Seto within the Võro–Seto branch. Several centuries of contact with Latvian (and especially the local Latgalian dialect), Russian and Polish have left a substantial layer of loanwords as well as phonological and morphological influence. By the 19th century, Russian had become the dominant language of administration and inter-ethnic communication in the region.

Sustained documentation of Lutsi began with the 1893 expedition of the Estonian folklorist and linguist Oskar Kallas, published the following year as Lutsi maarahvas. Kallas counted 4,387 inhabitants identified as ethnic Lutsi across 53 villages in the four rural parishes, of whom approximately 800 still spoke the dialect. Pre-war fieldwork by Paulopriit Voolaine in the 1920s recorded around 120 active speakers; August Sang's 1936 surveys put the number with native competence at 30–40.

In the second half of the 20th century the Lutsi-speaking community effectively collapsed: the dialect ceased to be a vehicle of daily interaction during the 1970s and 1980s, with about twenty users remaining by then. A 2001 Latvian population register listed 17 residents of Estonian ethnicity in Ludza District, of whom only two reported speaking Estonian; by 2013, sociolinguistic surveys identified one partial speaker and several rememberers, and by 2021 no remaining speakers.

The last person commonly identified as a fluent speaker was Nikolājs Nikonovs (1944–2006), from the village of Lielie Tjapši (Lutsi: Jānikülǟ) in Pilda parish; later sociolinguistic reassessment classified his competence as that of a "weak speaker", his knowledge of Lutsi having been transmitted primarily by his grandmother Antoņina Nikonova (1898–1983). His wife Antonīna Nikonova (1949–2014) was the last person with substantial passive knowledge of the dialect. Fragmentary vocabulary and stock phrases survive among present-day descendants, who otherwise speak Latvian — most often in its Latgalian variety — and, less commonly, Russian.

Documentation and revitalisation since the 2010s, funded between 2013 and 2016 by the Kone Foundation, has produced a Lutsi primer (Lutsi kiele lementar), a beginner's grammar reference and a dictionary.

== Sources and external links ==
- Ariste, Paul (1981). Keelekontaktid: eesti keele kontakte teiste keeltega. Emakeele Seltsi Toimetised (in Estonian). Vol. 14. Tallinn: Valgus.
- Kallas, Oskar (1894). Lutsi maarahvas (in Estonian). Helsinki: Suomalaisen Kirjallisuuden Seuran Kirjapaino.
- Mela, Marjo (2001). Latvian virolaiset: historia, kieli ja kulttuuri. Bibliotheca historica (in Finnish). Vol. 69. Helsinki: Suomalaisen Kirjallisuuden Seura. ISBN 951-746-301-4.
- Balodis, Uldis (2015). "Writing down Lutsi: Creating an orthography for a South Estonian variety of Latgale" (PDF). Valoda: nozīme un forma. 6. University of Latvia Press: 55–67.
- Balodis, Uldis (2019). "Expeditions among the Lutsi Estonians and the design of Language Learning Materials". Uralica Helsingiensia (14). doi:10.33341/uh.85046.
- Balodis, Uldis (2021). "Lutsi speakers and rememberers in the late 20th and early 21st centuries". Eesti ja soome-ugri keeleteaduse ajakiri. 12 (2): 211–249. doi:10.12697/jeful.2021.12.2.09.
- Lutsimaa: Land of the Ludza Estonians of Eastern Latvia (research project website)

== Sources and external links ==
- Paul Ariste Keelekontaktid. Tallinn: Valgus 1981. (in Estonian)
- Eestlased Lätis Retrieved May 8, 2007. (in Estonian)
- Väinö Klaus Läti eestlased Retrieved May 8, 2007. (in Estonian)
- Hannes Korjus Lutsi maarahvas – 110 aastat hiljem Retrieved May 8, 2007. (in Estonian)
- Marjo Mela Latvian virolaiset Helsinki: Suomalaisen kirjallisuuden seura 2001, ISBN 951-746-301-4 (in Finnish)
- Uldis Balodis http://www.lutsimaa.lv/Lutsimaa__Land_of_the_Ludza_Estonians/Home.html
