= Sarja (river) =

Sarja Sarjanka
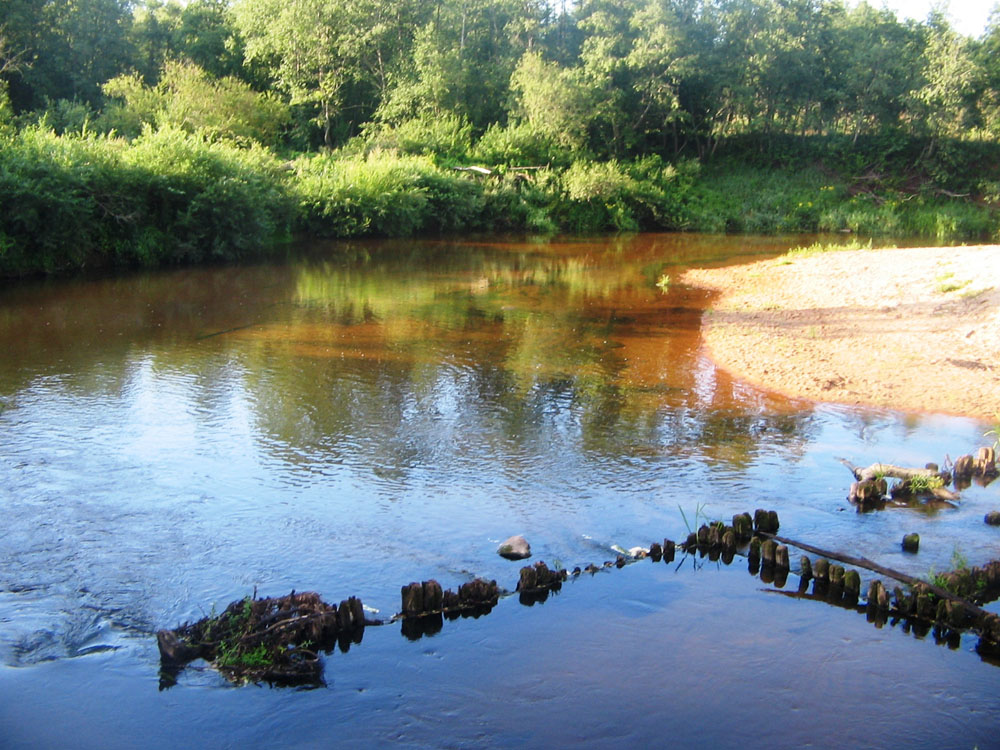

Location
- Country: Belarus, Latvia

Physical characteristics
- Source: Bižas Lake
  - location: Rundēni Parish, Ludza Municipality, Latvia
  - coordinates: 56°15′18″N 27°44′16″E
  - elevation: 172.2 m (565 ft)
- Mouth: Daugava
  - location: near Vyerkhnyadzvinsk in Belarus
  - coordinates: 55°49′44″N 27°52′51″E
  - elevation: 109 m (358 ft)
- Length: 85.4 km (53.1 mi)
- Basin size: 1,047 km^{2} (404 sq mi)

Sarja, also known as Sarjanka (Сарьянка), is a transboundary river in Latvia and Belarus, and a right-bank tributary of the Daugava River. Originating from Bižas Lake in eastern Latvia, the river flows through the historical and ethnographic region of Latgale before forming part of the Latvia–Belarus border and continuing into northern Belarus. The Sarja is 85.4 km long and belongs to the Daugava river basin, which ultimately drains into the Gulf of Riga in the Baltic Sea. The river flows through a sparsely populated landscape of forests, wetlands, and agricultural areas, and is noted for its natural scenery and ecological significance in the border region between the two countries. Several small tributaries join the Sarja along its course before it empties into the Daugava near Vyerkhnyadzvinsk in Belarus.
