= Ludza dialect =

Extinct dialect of South Estonian

Ludza
- Lutsi
- Ludzī kīļ
- Native to: Latvia
- Region: Latgale
- Ethnicity: Ludza Estonians
- Extinct: 2006 with the death of Nikolājs Nikonovs or 2014 with the death of Antonīna Nikonova, some people with slight knowledge remain
- Revival: Primer in Ludza published in 2020
- Language family: Uralic: Finnic; South Estonian; Ludza
- Writing system: Latin

Language codes
- ISO 639-3: –
- Glottolog: luts1235
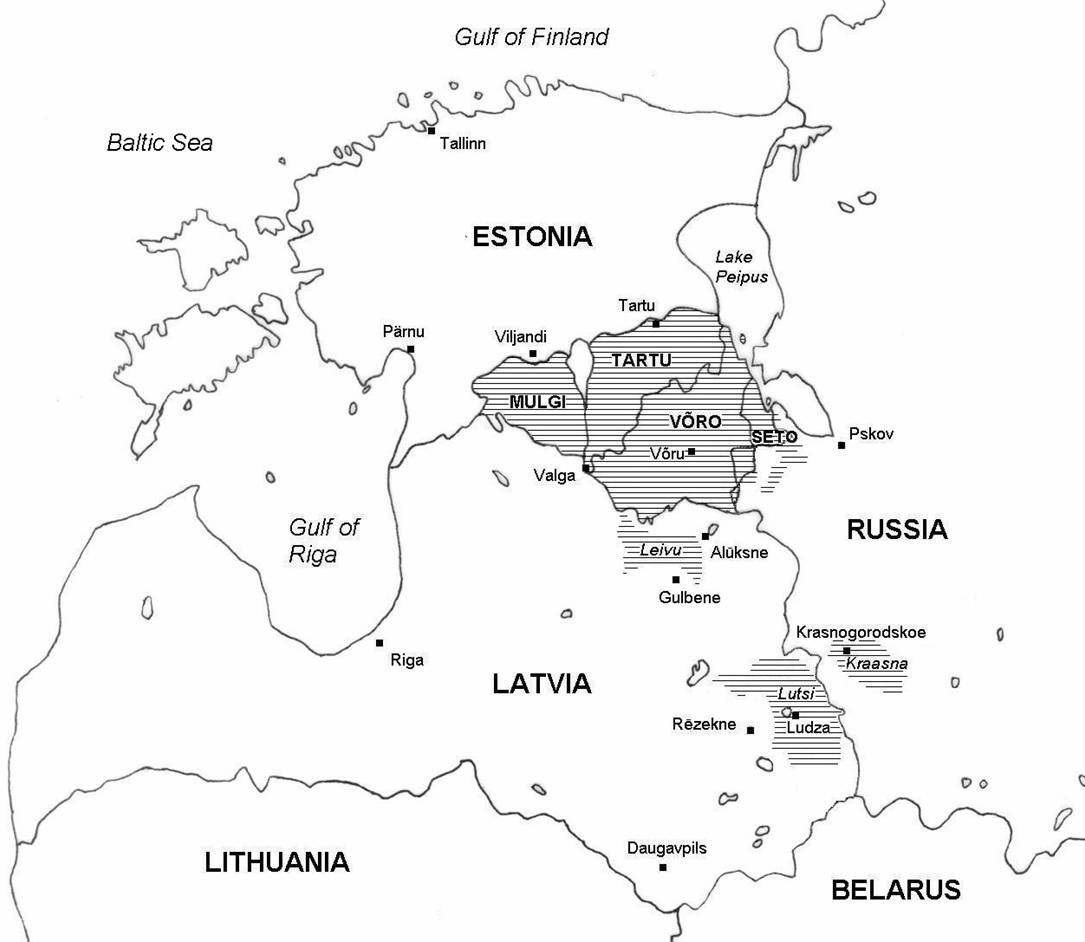
- The Ludza area is the enclave at the bottom of the map.

The Ludza dialect or Lutsi (Ludzī kīļ) is a dialect of South Estonian that was spoken in Latvia by the Ludza Estonians near the town of Ludza in Latvia. Ludza is the most similar to the Seto dialect of South Estonian. The Ludza dialect has historically been on a decline and is now extinct. It was estimated that around 800 people spoke Ludza in 1894, and by 1936 this number had decreased to only around 30 to 40 people. The last native speaker of the Ludza dialect was Nikolājs Nikonovs, who was from the village of Lielie Tjapši. He died in 2006, but some people still have limited knowledge of the dialect. The last knowledgeable language user with passive knowledge, Antonīna Nikonova, died later in 2014.

== History ==
The origin of the Ludza people is a mystery, and there are many theories about it. Lutsis themselves had many stories about their origins, one of the stories is about fleeing from Sweden. In 1893 Oskar Kallas found Ludzi speakers in 53 villages around Mērdzene, Pilda, Nirza and Brigi. There were attempts to get Ludza to be taught in schools, and at creating a standard written form. However these efforts were stopped by Ulmanis. Paulopriit Voolaine, who attempted to create Ludza education was banned from entering Latvia. During the Soviet occupation, Voolaine visited the Lutsis again. Lutsi dialect persisted the longest in Lielie Tjapši.

== Current situation ==
The Ludza people are still mostly aware of their heritage and some can make sentences in Ludza and know a few words. The Ludza people have in recent times connected with Livonians and in 2019 a Ludza song was performed at a Livonian culture event. In the year 2020 a book was published for studying the Ludza dialect called "Lutsi kiele lementar" by Uldis Balodis. Lutsis who live in the area around Mērdzene generally have no knowledge of the Ludza dialect but areas south of the town of Ludza near Pilda have more knowledge of the language.

== Phonology ==
Consonants of Ludza
	Labial	Dental/Alveolar	Post-alveolar/Palatal	Velar	Laryngeal
Nasal	m	n			
Stop	p	t		k	ʔ
Affricate		t͡s			
Fricative	(f) v	s	(ʃ) (ʒ)	(x)	h
Liquid		r	j		
Lateral		ɫ			

- All consonants except the glottal stop can be palatalized.
- Native obstruents are voiced intervocalically.
- /ɫ/ is pronounced as a plain lateral before front vowels.

Vowels of Ludza
	Front		Back	
	Unrounded	Rounded	Unrounded	Rounded
High	i	y	ɤ~ɯ	u
Mid	e	ø	ɤ~ɯ	o
Low	æ		ɑ	

- /i/ is the only neutral vowel; however, /e/ can appear in non-initial syllables in back harmonic words.

- /e/ is more retracted in back harmonic words.

- The non-low back unrounded vowels are in free variation.

There is a ternary length distinction in disyllables. In short disyllables the second syllable is longer than the first, in long disyllables both are of equal length and in overlong disyllables the first syllable is longer than the second.

Examples (reproduced from Balodis 2017)
	Short (Nominative/Genitive)	Long (Partitive)	Overlong (Illative)
"deep"	sy.væˑ	syv.væˑ	syvˑ.væ
"name"	ni.miˑ	nim.meˑ	nimˑ.me
"ice"	je.ɡæˑ (nom.)	jek.kæˑ	jekˑ.kæ

== Alphabet ==
a, ā, ä, ǟ, b, b̦, d, d̦, e, ē, f, g, ģ, h, h̦, i, ī, j, k, ķ, l, ļ, m, m̦, n, ņ, o, ō, ö, ȫ, p, p̦, q, r, ŗ, s, ș, š, t, ț, u, ū, ü, ǖ, v, v̦, y, ȳ, z, z̦, ž

== Examples of Ludza ==
=== Example of words in Ludza ===
- leib = bread
- vyezi = butter
- kașș = cat
- pinī = dog
- kanā = hen
- majā = house
- tsika = pig
- käzī = hand/arm
- küpǟr = hat
- pǟ = head
- jalg = leg/foot
- tütrik = girl
- sypr = friend

=== Examples of sentences in Ludza ===
Kuningas lähäț voiska poiga oțșma = The king sent the army to look for the boy

Kost sa neoq kalaq vytiq? = From where did you get those fish?

Sǟd jo imǟ poiga sytta = Still the mother is sending the son to war.

Tulkke mäele = Come up the mountain

Annaq mulle kaq maitsaq = Give it to me to taste, too

Kșondz katenetyiskümneni tunnini maka-aiq = The priest doesn't sleep until twelve o'clock
