= Ludza Castle =

Castle in Latvia

- Ludza, Latvia
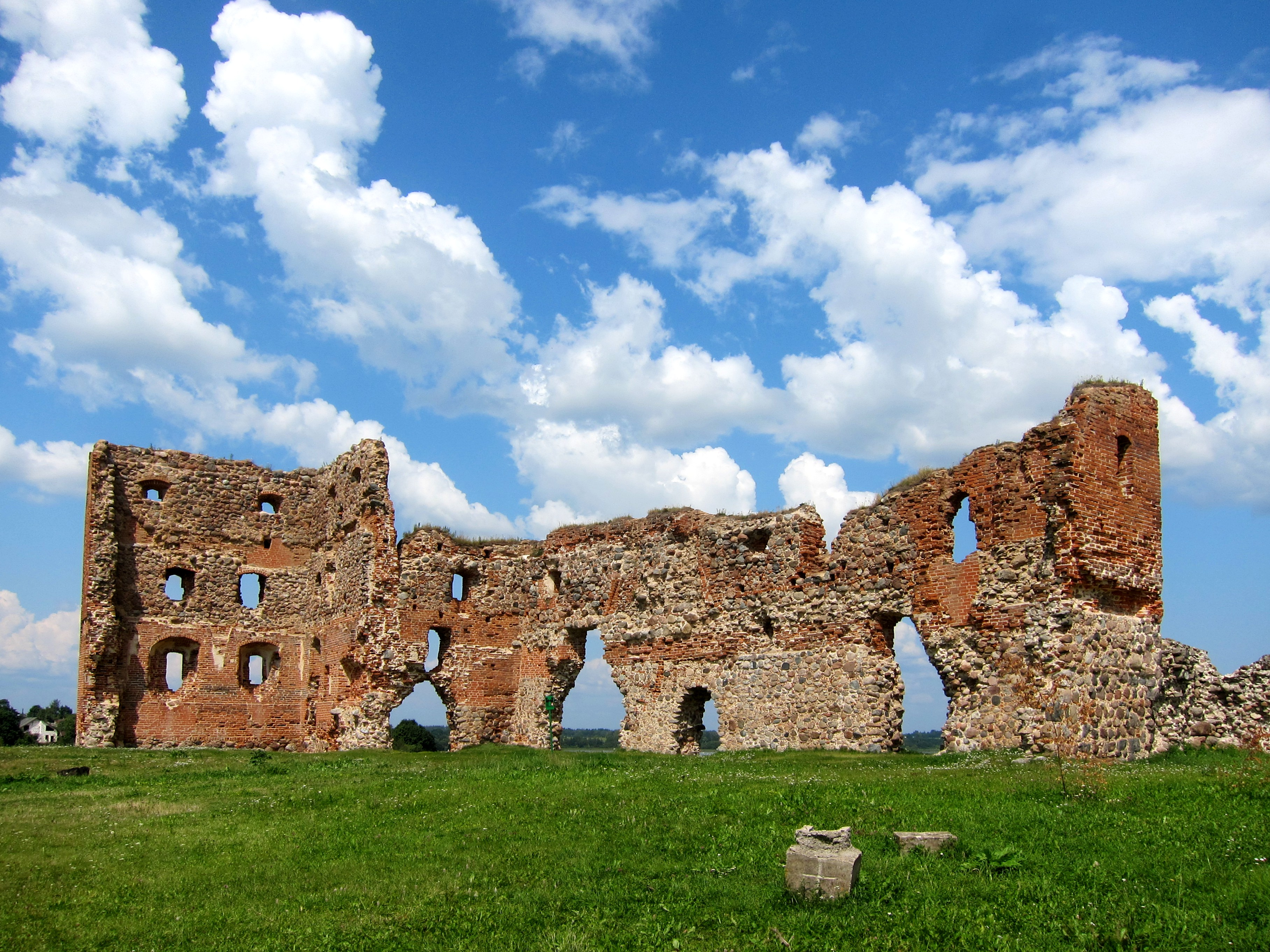
- Part of the castle ruins

Site information
- Type: Castle
- Open to the public: yes
- Condition: ruins up to 3 floors high

Location
- Coordinates: 56°32′56″N 27°43′43″E

Site history
- Built: 1433
- Built by: Livonian Order
- Materials: brick, stone
- Demolished: 1654

Ludza Castle (Latvian: Ludzas pils, German: Ordensburg Ludsen) was a medieval castle built in Gothic style located next to a Catholic church, on the site of a former Latgalian wooden castle in the centre Ludza, Latvia, a small town in eastern Latgale. Its main purpose was to be an eastern outpost to control trade routes from Russia. Nowadays the impressive fragments of the castle walls, including a three-floor high fragment, still remain. The ruins are the main tourist attraction in the Ludza district, and is considered a symbol of the town.

== History ==
The first mention of the castle dates from 1433 when the Livonian Order built a larger and stronger fortress to replace an earlier wooden fortress built by the ancient Latgalians. The Ludza stone castle had three stories, six towers, three gates and two foreparts. It was built as an outpost for the Livonian order, mainly to strengthen the eastern border of Livonia and guard trade routes from Russia.

In 1481 the Russians invaded Livonia, occupied and devastated the castle. Only the 1525 through improved relations with Muscovy, the Livonian Order rebuilt the castle only to see it destroyed again in 1654 by Russian troops under orders from the Russian tsar Aleksey. At the start of the Livonian War in 1558, German troops attacked Krasnij Gorodok and destroyed a number of parishes in Pskov. In the same year Moscovian troops of Grigoriy Temkin occupied the castle, but suffering defeat, he was forced to abandon his conquest.

In 1577 Livonia was once again invaded by Russian troops under the guidance of Ivan IV Vasilyevich and the castle was sacked. The following year the Order had Ludza castle with some others in the Grand Duchy of Lithuania mortgaged, and in 1561 asked the castle to be included in the Inflantia. In 1582 the castle returned to the Polish-Lithuanian Commonwealth.

During the Polish-Swedish War in 1625 the Swedish army occupied the castle, but the Polish-Lithuania Commonwealth soon got it back. In the Russo-Polish War of 1654–1667 in 1654 the Russian voivod Lev Saltikov surrounded Ludza and the castle surrendered. According to a decision of the Polish Sejm in 1667, only the Daugavpils castle was maintained and other defenses, including Ludza castle, were neglected. After that the castle was abandoned and left in ruins.

== See also ==
- List of castles in Latvia
