= Pilda Parish =

Parish of Latvia

- parish of Latvia
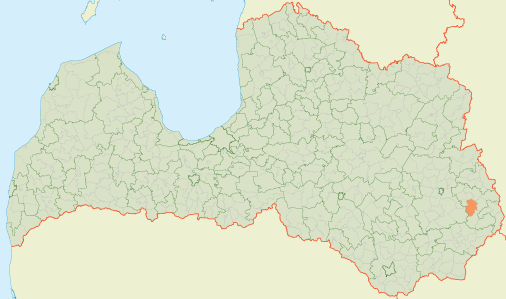
- Coordinates: 56°22′02″N 27°46′06″E
- Country: Latvia

Population (1 January 2026)
  - Total: 399

Pilda Parish (Latvian: Pildas pagasts) is an administrative unit of Ludza Municipality in the Latgale region of Latvia. It is also one of the rare places where people have some knowledge of the Ludza dialect

== Towns, villages and settlements of Pilda Parish ==
Lielie Tjapši
