= Lielie Tjapši =

Village in Latvia

Coordinates: 56°24′02″N 27°50′14″E

Lielie Tjapši (Ludza: Jānikülä or Sūreq Tsäpsiq) is a small village in the extreme eastern part of the Pilda Parish of Ludza Municipality in the Latgale region of Latvia. The last native speakers of Ludza lived in Lielie Tjapši; the dialect persisted there because of Antoņina Nikonova, who was a passionate speaker of Ludza. Lielie Tjapši is very small and only has a few houses.

== See also ==
- Ludza dialect
- Latgale
