= Ludza =

Town and capital of Ludza Municipality, Latvia

- Town
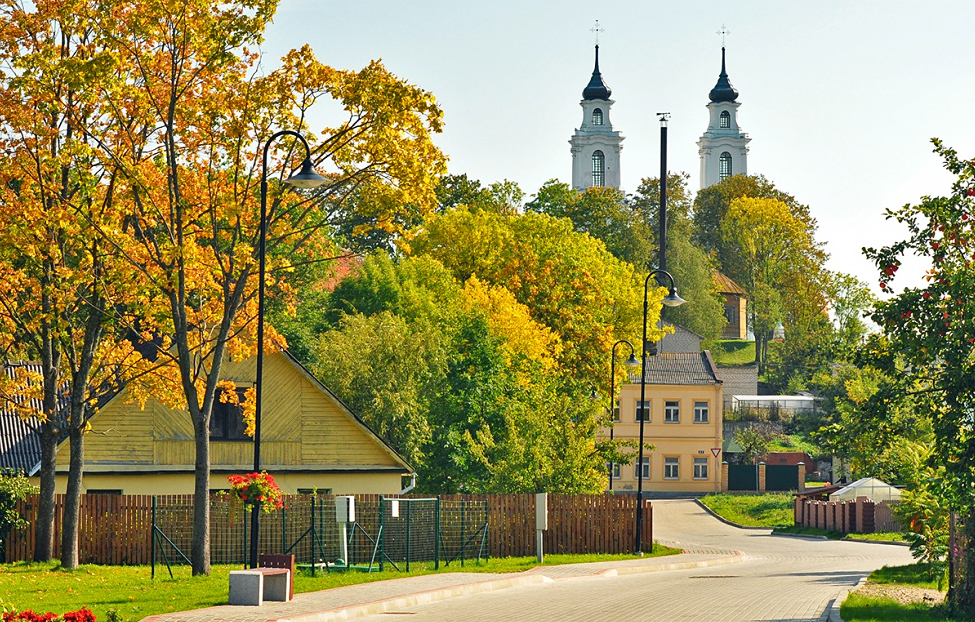
- Ludza skyline

- Coat of arms

- Location in Latvia
- Coordinates: 56°33′N 27°43′E
- Country: Latvia
- Municipality: Ludza Municipality
- Town rights: 1177

Government
  - Mayor: Edgars Mekšs

Area
  - Total: 10.47 km^{2} (4.04 sq mi)
  - Land: 9.17 km^{2} (3.54 sq mi)
  - Water: 1.3 km^{2} (0.50 sq mi)

Population (2026)
  - Total: 7,054
  - Density: 769/km^{2} (1,990/sq mi)
- Time zone: UTC+2 (EET)
  - Summer (DST): UTC+3 (EEST)
- Postal code: LV-570(1-2)
- Calling code: +371 657
- Number of Municipality council members: 15
- Website: ludza.lv

Ludza (Polish: Lucyn, German: Ludsen, Yiddish: לוצין, romanized: Lutsin, Russian: Лудза, Ludza) is a town in the Latgale region of eastern Latvia. Ludza is the oldest town in Latvia and this is commemorated by a key in its coat of arms. Ludza is the administrative centre of Ludza Municipality that is located nearby the Russian border. The population as of 2020 was 7,667.

== History ==
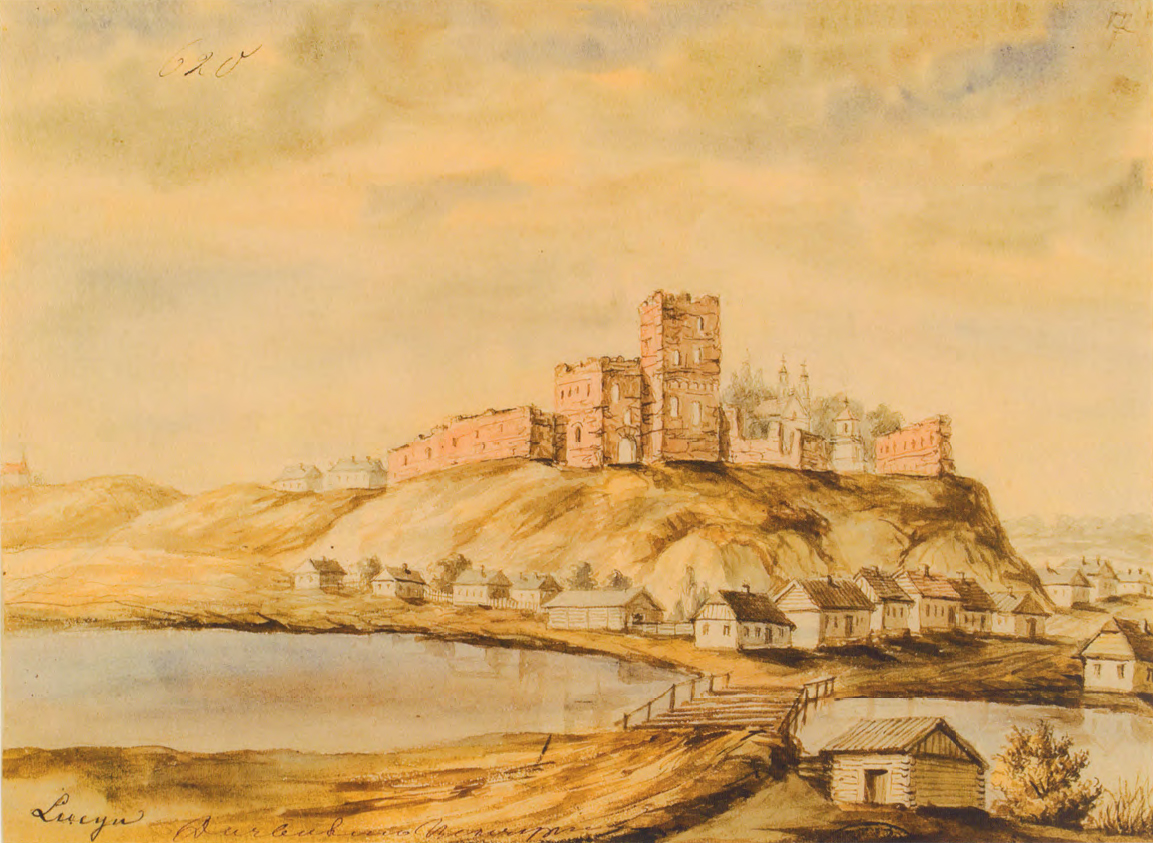
Painting of Ludza Castle ruins by Napoleon Orda.

After Nikolay Karamzin, Ludza was first mentioned as Лючин in Hypatian Codex dating back to 1173 or 1177. In 1399 the Livonian Order built a stone fortress atop an older Latgalian fortress and used Ludza as an eastern outpost in Livonia. Ludza Castle ruins can be visited nowadays.

=== Polish-Lithuanian Commonwealth ===
After the dissolution of the Livonian Order in 1561, Ludza was incorporated into the Polish–Lithuanian Commonwealth and became a part of Wenden Voivodeship. In January 1626, during the Polish-Swedish War, Ludza was captured without a battle by Sweden due to the defeat of the forces of Polish-Lithuanian marshal Jan Stanisław Sapieha. Later it was recaptured by Polish forces.

In 1678, Commonwealth's Sejm appointed a special commission in Grodno that had to build Catholic churches in Latgale. A year later, the commission visited Ludza and in 1687, building of the church was completed. In 1736, the church was destroyed by fire.

=== Russian Empire ===
After the first partition of Poland in 1772, Ludza was taken over by the Russian Empire and added to Vitebsk Governorate. Ludza received town rights in 1777 from Catherine II of Russia. During the first part of the 19th century, most of the population of Ludza were Jews (67% in 1815) and there were 7 synagogues in the town.

=== Latvia ===
After signing of the Latvian–Soviet Peace Treaty in 1920, Ludzas apriņķis and Ludza as its administrative centre was incorporated into the Republic of Latvia.

During World War II, Ludza was under German occupation from 4 July 1941 until 23 July 1944. It was administered as a part of the Generalbezirk Lettland of Reichskommissariat Ostland. The Jewish population was restricted to a ghetto. From July 1941 until the spring of 1942, hundreds of Jews were murdered in mass executions perpetrated by Einsatzgruppen.

After Latvia regained its independence in 1991, Ludza became the administrative centre of Ludza district. On July 1, 2009, due to the introduction of the new administrative division in Latvia it became the centre of Ludza Municipality.

== Tourism ==
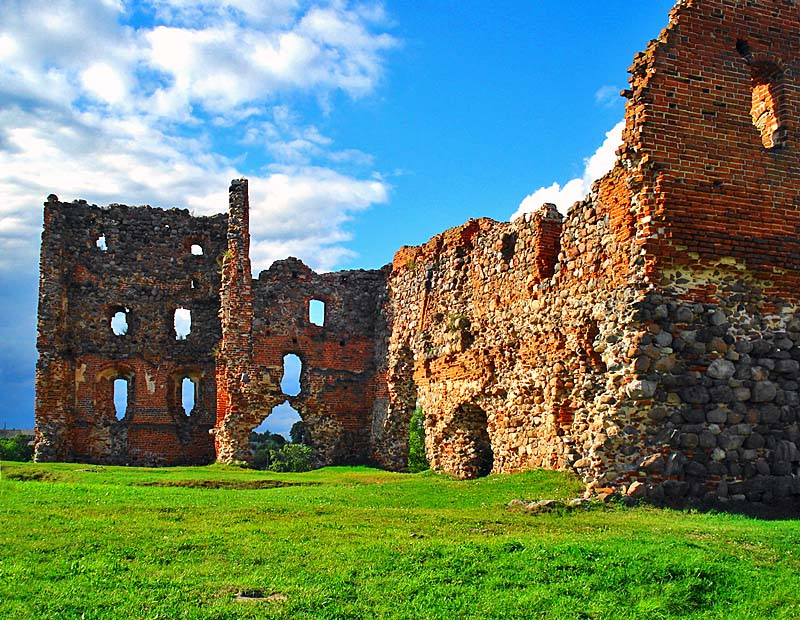
Ruins of the Ludza Castle

Ludza Museum and Ludza Tourism Information Centre offer excursions around the town. The most visited sights are:

- Ludza History Museum and open-air exposition
- Roman Catholic Church
- Orthodox Church
- Evangelical Lutheran Church
- Old Believers' Church
- Ruins of the medieval Ludza Castle
- Ludza Craftsmen Centre

Several lakes offer fishing and water tourism possibilities.

== Transport ==
=== Roads ===
Ludza is located on the main Riga - Moscow road, as a part of European route E22, and only 30 km away from the Latvian-Russian border.

=== Railway ===
Ludza Train Station is a part of the Rēzekne II - Zilupe railway line that was originally built in 1901 as a part of Ventspils - Moscow line. The current station building was built after the World War II.

== Education ==
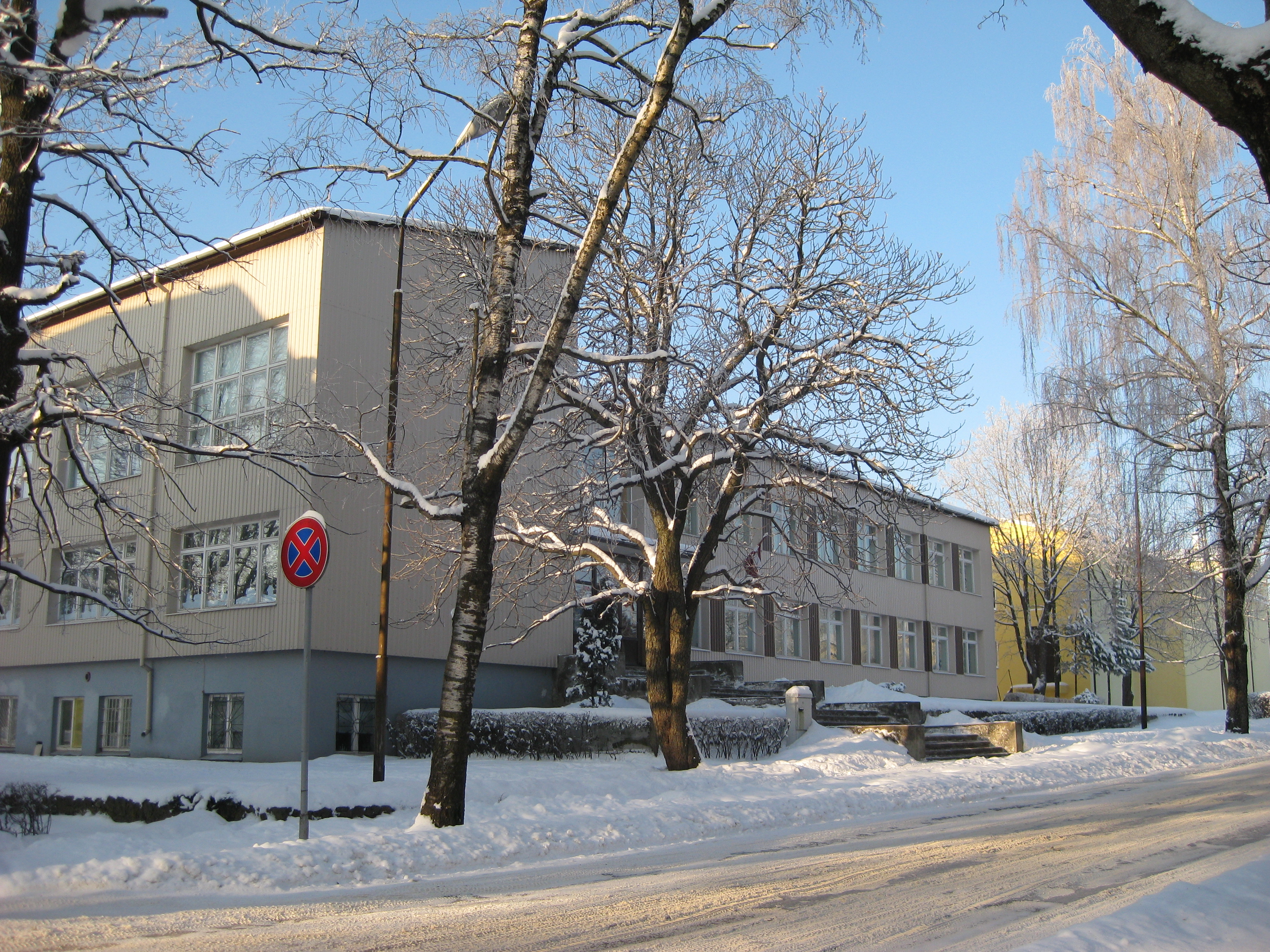
Ludza Music School in winter

The children of Ludza may attend three pre-school educational institutions - "Rūķītis", "Pasaciņa" and "Namiņš". Elementary and secondary education curricula are provided by Ludza Gymnasium and Ludza Secondary School #2, as well as by Ludza Evening Secondary School. Additional out of school activities are offered at:

- Ludza Music Primary School (music school with integrated primary school)
- Ludza Art School
- Ludza Children and Youth Centre
- Ludza Sport School

== Demographics ==
As of 2020, the town had a population of 7,667, of which 4,455 (58.1%) were ethnic Latvians, 2,661 (34.7%) were ethnic Russians, 168 (2.1%) were Belarusians, 93 (1.2%) were Ukrainians, 63 (0.8%) were Poles, 24 (0.3%) were Lithuanians, and 187 (2.4%) belonging to other ethnic groups.

== Notable people ==
=== Born in Ludza ===
- Yakov Kulnev (1763–1812), major-generalof the Russian military, hero of the Patriotic war with Napoleon
- Karol Bohdanowicz (1864–1947), Polish geologist, an expert in mining geology
- Ferdynand Antoni Ossendowski (1878—1945), Polish writer and explorer, university professor, and anticommunist political activist.
- Czeslaw Znamierowski (1890 – 1977), Soviet Lithuanian painter, a member of the Artists' Union of the USSR
- Leonid Dobychin (1894–1936), Russian and Soviet writer.
- Ilya Chashnik (1902–1929), Russian suprematist painter
- Sergejs Lazovskis (born 1976), weightlifter, competed in the 2000 Summer Olympics

== Twinning and international cooperation ==
Ludza municipality has several cooperation partners abroad.

- Bad Bodenteich (Germany)
- Brest (Belarus)
- Hlybokaye (Belarus)
- Nevel (Russia)
- Novopolotsk (Belarus)
- Sebezh (Russia)

== See also ==
- Ludza Estonians
- Ludza municipality
- Ludza castle ruins
- Ludza Municipality#Notable people
