= List of extinct languages and dialects of Europe =

Language Endangerment Status by UNESCO Atlas of the World's Languages in Danger category

Extinct (EX)
- Extinct (EX): (lists)

Endangered
- Critically Endangered (CR); Severely Endangered (SE); Definitely Endangered (DE); Vulnerable (VU): (list); (list); (list); (list)

Safe
- Safe (NE): no list
- Other categories
- Revived (RE); Constructed (CL): (list); (list)
- Related topics: Atlas of the World's Languages in Danger; Endangered Languages Project; Ethnologue; Unclassified language; List of languages by total number of speakers
- UNESCO Atlas of the World's; Languages in Danger categories

This article is a list of languages and dialects that have no native speakers, no spoken descendants, and that diverged from their parent language in Europe.

== Currently extinct ==
Language/dialect	Family	Date of extinction	Region	Ethnic group(s)
Aeolic Greek	Indo-European	300s BC	Aeolis, Boeotia, Lesbos, Thessaly	Aeolians
Aequian	Indo-European	200s BC	East-central Italy	Aequi
Akkala Sámi	Uralic	29 December 2003	Southwest Kola Peninsula	Akkala Sámi
Alavese	Basque (language isolate)	[data missing]	Álava	Alavese Basques
Ancient Belgian	Indo-European	[data missing]	Nordwestblock	Belgae
Ancient Macedonian	Indo-European	0–300s AD	Macedonia	Ancient Macedonians
Angel Danish	Indo-European	after the 1930s	Angeln	Danes
Andalusi Arabic	Afroasiatic	1600s AD	Al-Andalus	Andalusi Muslims
Andalusi Romance	Indo-European	1300s AD	Al-Andalus	Mozarabs and Muladí
Antrim Irish	Indo-European	25 February 1983	County Antrim	Irish
Arcadocypriot Greek	Indo-European	300s BC	Arcadia and Cyprus	Arcadocypriot Greeks
Armeno-Kipchak	Turkic	1600s AD	Crimea	Crimean Armenians
Army Slavic	German–Czech pidgin	1918 AD	Austria-Hungary	Austro-Hungarian Army
Arran Gaelic	Indo-European	1977 AD	Isle of Arran	Arran Gaels
Auregnais	Indo-European	1960s AD	Alderney	Channel Islanders of Alderney
Basque–Icelandic pidgin	Basque–Icelandic pidgin	1600s AD	Westfjords	Basque whalers and Icelanders
Batz-sur-Mer Breton	Indo-European	1960s	Batz-sur-Mer	Bretons
Bjarmian Finnic	Uralic	1000s AD	Bjarmaland	Bjarmia
Bjarmian Sámi	Uralic	[data missing]	Northern Dvina	Bjarmian Sámis
Bohemian Romani	Indo-European	1939–1945	Bohemia	Bohemian Romani
Borgarmålet	Swedish–Sámi pidgin	1700s AD	Swedish Sápmi	Swedes and Sámi
Botifarra	Indo-European	20th century	Palma de Mallorca	Botifarra (Mallorca)
British Latin	Indo-European	700s AD	Roman Britain; later Anglo-Saxon England	British Romans
Bulgar	Turkic	1200s AD	Danubian Bulgaria and Volga Bulgaria	Bulgars
Buri	Indo-European	[data missing]	western Slovakia	Buri tribe
Burgundian	Indo-European	500s AD	Kingdom of the Burgundians	Burgundians
Camunic	Unclassified	500–0s BC	Val Camonica	Camunni
Capraiese	Indo-European	1900s	Capraia Isola	Capraia people
Celtiberian	Indo-European	100s AD	Iberia	Celtiberians
Chinato	Indo-European	by 1995	Malpartida de Plasencia	Extremadurans
Chwalim	Indo-European	after 1945	Chwalim	Chwalimiaks
Cimmerian	Indo-European	620–580s BC	North Caucasus	Cimmerians
Cisalpine Gaulish	Indo-European	50s BC	Cisalpine Gaul	Cisalpine Gauls
Community of Villages Aragonese	Indo-European	[data missing]	Kingdom of Aragon	Aragonese
Crimean Gothic	Indo-European	1700s AD	Crimea	Crimean Goths
Cromarty	Indo-European	2 October 2012	Cromarty	Scots
Cuman	Turkic	1770 AD	Cumania and Hungary	Cumans
Cumbric	Indo-European	1100s AD	Cumbria	Cumbrians
Curonian	Indo-European	1500s AD	Courland	Curonians
Dacian	Indo-European	500s AD	Dacia	Dacians
Dalmatian	Indo-European	10 June 1898	Dalmatia	Dalmatians
Dardanian	Indo-European	[data missing]	Kingdom of Dardania	Dardani
Deeside Gaelic	Indo-European	18 March 1984	Aberdeenshire	Gaels of Aberdeenshire
Dician	Indo-European	early 1900s AD	Dobruja	Dobrujans
East Sutherland Gaelic	Indo-European	2020	Sutherland	Gaels, Scottish people
Eastern Navarrese	Basque (language isolate)	1991	Navarre	Basques
Ebro Valley Aragonese	Indo-European	1600s AD	Ebro Valley	Aragonese
Eiderstedt Frisian	Indo-European	mid-1800s AD	Eiderstedt	Eiderstedt Frisians
Elymian	Indo-European	500–0s BC	Western Sicily	Elymians
Eteocretan	Unclassified	200s BC	Crete	Eteocretans
Eteocypriot	Unclassified	300s BC	Cyprus	Eteocypriots
Etruscan	Tyrsenian	0s AD	Etruria	Etruscans
Faliscan	Indo-European	100s BC	Northern Lazio	Falisci
Figun	Indo-European	1920s	Arrondissement of Grasse	Figouns
Fingallian	Indo-European	1840–1860s	Fingal	Fingallians
Franco-Italian	Indo-European	1300s AD	Northern Italy	North Italian writers
Gallaecian	Indo-European	[data missing]	Gallaecia	Gallaeci
Galwegian Gaelic	Indo-European	1760 AD	Galloway	Galwegian Gaels
Gaulish	Indo-European	500s AD	Gaul	Gauls
Gelonian	Indo-European	[data missing]	Gallaecia	Vorskla
Gepidian	Indo-European	600s AD	Kingdom of the Gepids	Gepids
Golyad	Indo-European	1100s AD	Protva basin	Eastern Galindians
Gothic	Indo-European	1700s AD	Throughout Europe	Goths
Harlingerland Frisian	Indo-European	1700s AD	Harlingerland	East Frisians
Hernican	Indo-European	1000–0s BC	Southeast Latium	Hernici
Herulian	Indo-European	500s AD	Middle Danube	Heruli
Hiberno-Latin	Indo-European	1100s AD	Ireland	Irish monks
Hunnic	Unclassified	400s AD	Hunnic Empire	Huns
Iazychie	Indo-European	1900s	Halychyna, Bukovina, Zakarpattia	Ukrainian and Carpatho-Rusyn Moskvophiles
Iberian	Unclassified	0–500s AD	Iberia	Iberians
Illyrian	Indo-European	100s AD	Illyria	Illyrians
Isla Cristina Catalan	Indo-European	[data missing]	Isla Cristina	Isla Cristina Catalans
Istrian Albanian	Indo-European	1800s AD	Istria	Istrian Albanians
Jassic	Indo-European	1400s AD	Jászság	Jász
Judaeo-Aragonese	Indo-European	after 1492 AD	Aragon	Aragonese Jews
Judaeo-Catalan	Indo-European	after 1492 AD	Catalan Countries	Catalonian Jews
Judaeo-Piedmontese	Indo-European	[data missing]	Piedmont	Piedmontese Jews
Judaeo-Portuguese	Indo-European	1800–1820s AD	Portugal	Portuguese Jews
Judeo-Gascon	Indo-European	[data missing]	Gascony	Spanish and Portuguese Jews
Judeo-Livornese	Indo-European	After August 18, 1962	Livorno	Livornese Jews
Judeo-Mantuan	Indo-European	1900s	Mantua	Mantuan Jews
Judeo-Provençal	Indo-European	mid-1900s	Provence	Provençal Jews
Judeo-Salentinian	Indo-European	[data missing]	Salento	Salento Jews
Judeo-Sicilian Greek	Indo-European	[data missing]	Sicily	Sicilian Jews
Judeo-Venetian	Indo-European	1900s	Venice	Venetian Jews
Kainuu Sámi	Uralic	1700s AD	Kainuu	Kainuu Sámi
Karamanli Turkish	Turkic	1800s	Greece, Bulgaria and North Macedonia	Karamanlides
Kemi Sámi	Uralic	1900s	Southern Finnish Lapland	Kemi Sámi
Khazar	Turkic	1100s AD	Khazar Khaganate	Khazars
Kizlar–Mozdokian	Kartvelian	[data missing]	Kizlyar and Mozdok	Georgians
Klezmer-loshn	Indo-European	1900s AD	Eastern Europe	Klezmorim
Knaanic	Indo-European	1600s AD	Central Europe	West Slavic Jews
Kraasna	Uralic	1935-1939 AD	Krasnogorodsk	Kraasna Estonians
Krevinian	Uralic	1800s AD	Latvia	Kreevins
Lachoudisch	Indo-European	2022 AD	Schopfloch	Jews of Bavaria
Laiuse Romani	Mixed Romani–Estonian	1940s AD	Laiuse	Romani of Laiuse
Lanuvian	Indo-European	500s BC	Lanuvium	Lanuvians
Leinster Irish	Indo-European	[data missing]	Leinster	Irish of Leinster
Leivu	Uralic	1988 AD	Gauja	Gauja Estonians
Lemnian	Tyrsenian	400s BC	Lemnos	Lemnians
Lepontic	Indo-European	0s BC	Cisalpine Gaul and Raetia	Lepontii
Liburnian	Indo-European	200s BC-300s AD	Liburnia	Liburnians
Ligurian	Indo-European	100s AD	Liguria	Ligures
Locrian Greek	Indo-European	[data missing]	Locris	Locrians
Lombardic	Indo-European	800s AD	Pannonia and Italy	Lombards
Lotegorisch	Indo-European	[data missing]	Leiningerland	Jews of Rhineland-Palatinate
Ludza	Uralic	2006 or 2014	Latgale	Ludza Estonians
Lusitanian	Indo-European	100s AD	Lusitania	Lusitanians
Malkh	Northeast Caucasian	[data missing]	North Caucasus	Malkh
Manx	Indo-European	27 December 1974	Isle of Man	Manx people
Marcho-Magdeburgian	Indo-European	[data missing]	Altmark and Magdeburg	
Marsian	Indo-European	150s BC	Marsica	Marsi
Marrucinian	Indo-European	200s BC	Chieti	Marrucini
Merya	Uralic	1700s AD	Upper Volga region	Meryans
Meshchera	Uralic	1500s AD	Meshchera Lowlands	Meshchera
Messapic	Indo-European	100s BC	Salento	Messapians
Minoan	Unclassified	1450s BC	Crete	Minoans
Moselle Romance	Indo-European	1000s AD	The Moselle	People along the Moselle
Muglisano	Indo-European	1898	Province of Trieste	Friulians
Murcian Catalan	Indo-European	1800s AD	Region of Murcia	Murcians
Muromian	Uralic	900s AD	Oka basin	Muromians
Mycenaean Greek	Indo-European	1200s BC	Mycenaean Greece	Mycenaean Greeks
Mysian	Indo-European	0s BC	Balkans	Mysians
Navarrese Romance	Indo-European	1600s AD	Kingdom of Navarre	Navarrese
Noric	Indo-European	100s AD	Noricum	Norici
Norn	Indo-European	1850 AD	Northern Isles and Caithness	Norse settlement of Northern Isles and Caithness
North Picene	Unclassified	1000–0s BC	North Picenum	North Picentes
Northern Manx	Indo-European	1940s AD	Northern part of the Isle of Man	Northern Manx
Oenotrian	Indo-European	400s BC	Southern Italy	Oenotrians
Old Novgorod	Indo-European	1500s AD	Novgorod Republic	Novgorodians
Old Prussian	Indo-European	1700s AD	Prussia	Old Prussians
Old Pskov	Indo-European	1400s AD	Pskov Republic	Pskovians
Old Riojan	Indo-European	1200s AD	La Rioja	Riojans
Old South Frisian	Indo-European	[data missing]	Germany or Netherlands?	South Frisians
Old Kentish Sign Language	Language isolate	[data missing]	Kent	Deaf Kentish people
Oscan	Indo-European	0s AD	Campania and Latium adiectum	Osci
Paduan	Indo-European	1600s AD	Padua	Paduans
Paelignian	Indo-European	100s BC	Valle Peligna	Paeligni
Paeonian	Indo-European	[data missing]	Paeonia	Paeonians
Paleo-Corsican	Unclassified	[data missing]	Corsica	Ancient Corsi
Paleo-Sardinian	Unclassified	100s AD	Sardinia	Nuragic peoples
Pamphylian Greek	Indo-European	[data missing]	Pamphylia	Pamphylians
Pannonian Avar	Unclassified	800s AD	Pannonian Basin	Pannonian Avars
Pannonian Romance	Indo-European	1100s AD	Pannonia	Latin Pannonians
Pantellerian Arabic	Afroasiatic	1700s AD	Pantelleria	Pantellerians
Pecheneg	Turkic	1100s AD	Eastern Europe	Pechenegs
Pelasgian	Unclassified	[data missing]	Aegean Islands	Pelasgians
Phrygian	Indo-European	400 AD	Balkans	Bryges
Pictish	Indo-European	1000s AD	Northern Scotland	Picts
Polabian	Indo-European	3 October 1756 AD	Northeastern Germany	Polabian Slavs, Drevani
Pontic Scythian	Indo-European	0s BC	Scythians	Pontic–Caspian steppe
Pomeranian Baltic	Indo-European	1000s BC	Baltic Pomerania	Pomeranian Balts
Praenestinian	Indo-European	500s BC	Palestrina	Praenestinians
Prague German	Indo-European	after 1945	Prague	Prague Germans
Pre-Samnite	Indo-European	500s BC	Campania	Pre-Samnites
Propontis Tsakonian	Indo-European	1970	Greece	Tsakonians
Punic	Afroasiatic	600s AD	Iberia, Malta, Sicily, Sardinia and the Balearic Islands	Carthaginians
Rani	Indo-European	1404 AD	Rügen (Rȯjana)	Rani
Rhaetic	Tyrsenian	0s BC	Raetia	Raeti
Rotvælsk	Indo-European	1900s AD	Denmark	Natmændsfolk
Rugian	Indo-European	[data missing]	Lower Austria	Rugii
Russenorsk	Russian–Norwegian pidgin	1900s AD	Northern Norway	Pomors and Norwegians
Sabine	Indo-European	300s–200s BC	Sabina	Sabines
Sabir	Romance-based Pidgin	1800s AD	Mediterranean Basin	Medieval traders and Crusaders
Salaca Livonian	Uralic	1868	Salaca	Livonians
Selonian	Indo-European	1500s AD	Selonia	Selonians
Semigallian	Indo-European	1500s AD	Semigallia	Semigallians
Shirvani Arabic	Afroasiatic	1850–1890s AD	Dagestan, Azerbaijan	Caucasian Arabs
Sicanian	Unclassified	300s BC	Central Sicily	Sicani
Siculian	Indo-European	300s BC	Eastern Sicily	Sicels
Sidicini	Indo-European	[data missing]	Sidicinum	Sidicini
Skalvian	Indo-European	1200s AD	Scalovia	Skalvians
Skirian	Indo-European	[data missing]	North of the Middle Danube	Sciri
Slovincian	Indo-European	1900s AD	Northwestern Kashubia	Slovincians
Solombala English	English–Russian pidgin	1800s AD	Solombala Shipyard	English and Russian traders
Sorothaptic	Indo-European	100s AD	Catalan Countries	Urnfield culture
South Picene	Indo-European	300s BC	South Picenum	South Picentes
Southern Goesharde Frisian	Indo-European	1981 AD	Southern Goesharde	Frisians of South Goesharde
Spasell	Indo-European	1800s AD	Valassina	Valassina people
Sudovian	Indo-European	1500s AD	Yotvingia	Yotvingians
Suebian	Indo-European	500s AD	Elbe basin and northwestern Iberia	Suebi
Tartessian	Unclassified	100s BC	Tartessos	Tartessians
Tergestino	Indo-European	1889	Province of Trieste	Friulians
Thracian	Indo-European	500s AD	Thracia	Thracians
Traveller Danish	Mixed Danish–Romani	early 1900s AD	Denmark	Romani
Ubykh	Northwest Caucasian	7 October 1992	Ubykhia	Ubykh
Umbrian	Indo-European	0s BC	Umbria	Umbri
Upgant Frisian	Indo-European	mid-1600s AD	Upgant-Schott	Frisians of Upgant-Schott
Valencian Aragonese	Indo-European	1400s AD	Kingdom of Valencia	Valencians
Vandalic	Indo-European	500s AD	Vandal kingdoms	Vandals
Värmland Savonian	Uralic	1969 AD	Värmland	Forest Finns
Venetic	Indo-European	0s BC	Veneto	Adriatic Veneti
Vestinian	Indo-European	100s BC	Abruzzo	Vestini
Volscian	Indo-European	200s BC	Volscia	Volsci
Voynichese	Unclassified	1400s AD	Italy	Voynichese speakers
Wangerooge Frisian	Indo-European	22 November 1950	Wangerooge	Wangerooge Frisians
Welsh Romani	Indo-European	1950 AD	Wales	Romani
West Galindian	Indo-European	1300s AD	Prussia	Western Galindians
Wursten Frisian	Indo-European	1810–1830s AD	Land Wursten	Frisians of Land Wursten
Yola	Indo-European	1800s AD	Forth and Bargy	Norman Irish of Forth and Bargy
Zarphatic	Indo-European	1300s AD	Northern France and western Germany	French Jews

== Formerly extinct ==
Language/dialect	Family	Date of extinction	Date of revival	Region	Ethnic group
Cornish	Indo-European	1700s AD	1900s	Cornwall	Cornish people
Livonian	Uralic	2 June 2013	2020	Livonian Coast	Livonians

== See also ==
- Lists of extinct languages
- List of endangered languages in Europe
