= Muslimov =

Muslimov is a surname. Notable people with the surname include:

- Magomed Muslimov (born 1992), Russian footballer
- Mehmet Muslimov (born 1964), Russian linguist
- Murtazali Muslimov, Azerbaijani freestyle wrestler
- Pavel Muslimov (born 1967), Russian biathlete
- Shirali Muslimov, Azerbaijani supercentenarian
