= Itsipino =

Rural locality in Kingiseppsky District, Russia

Coordinates: 59°40′24″N 28°52′46″E

Itsipino (Russian: Иципино; Votic: Icäpäivä or Mäci) is a rural locality (a village) in Kingiseppsky District of Leningrad Oblast, Russia.

The first mention of it is from 1618, with the name Itsepina by. Another mention is in 1684 with the name Muskina Itsepina. In 1848, the village was inhabited by 220 Votians, and in 1901 there were 279 residents. Itsipino was where the last known speaker of Votic eastern dialect died in the 1960s.
