= Kukkuzi dialect =

Dialect of Votic spoken in a part of Russia

Kukkuzi
- Native to: Russia
- Region: Ingria
- Native speakers: 3 (2006) possibly extinct
- Language family: Uralic: Finnic; Votic or Ladogan; Kukkuzi

Language codes
- ISO 639-3: –
- Glottolog: kukk1240 Kukkuzi
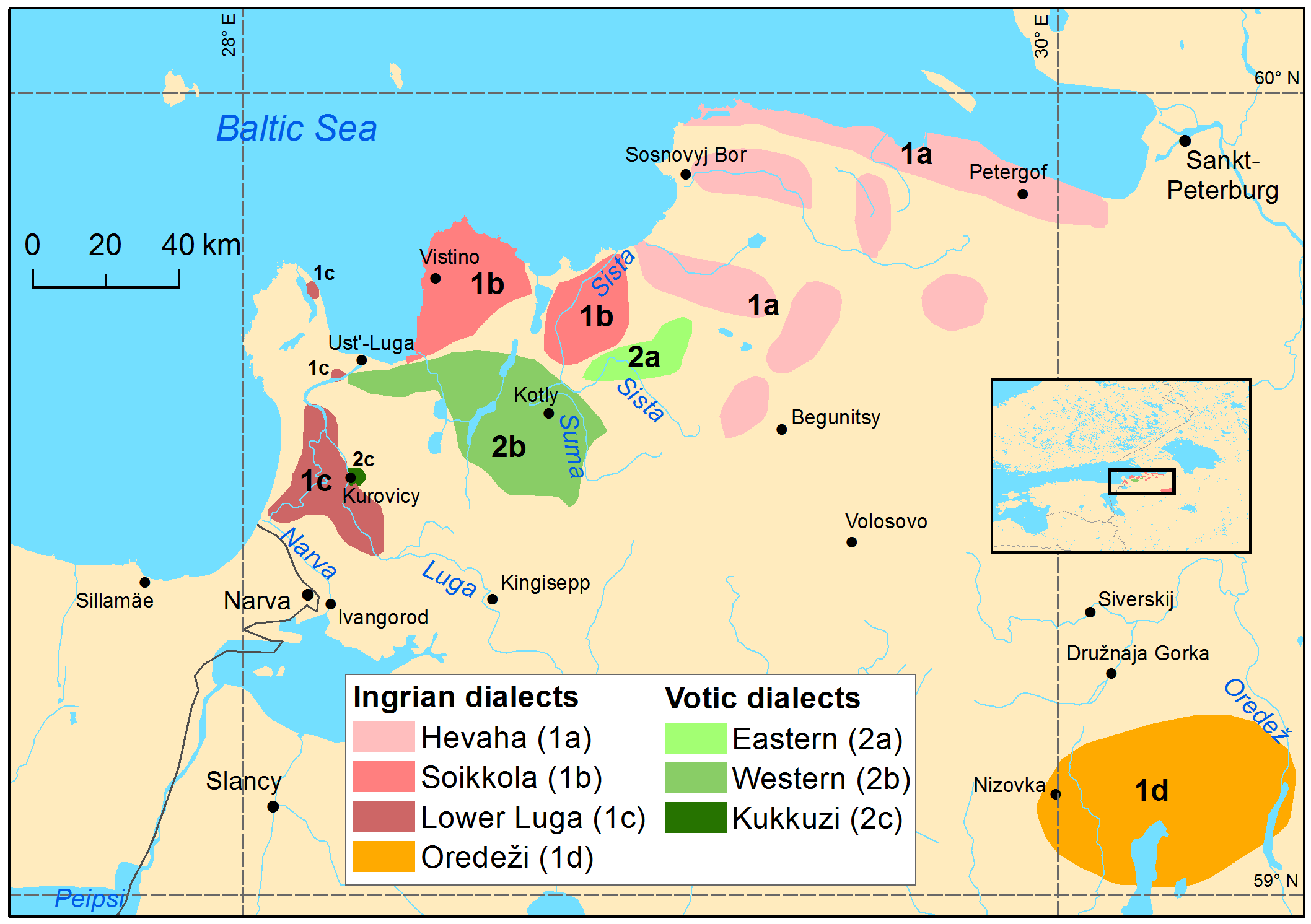
- Kukkuzi

The Kukkuzi dialect or Kukkusi dialect (Куровицы) is a dialect of Votic spoken in Kukkuzi. The Kukkuzi dialect has been heavily influenced by Ingrian.

There exists a recording session of the Kukkuzi dialect, which was made in 2008–2012. A Kukkuzi dialect dictionary has been made in 1980. The Kukkuzi dialect has been declared to be dead since the 1970s, however three speakers were located in 2006.

== Classification ==
According to E.B. Markus the Kukkuzi dialect has Ingrian-like vocabulary and phonetics, while containing Votic grammar which is a result of an incomplete language switch to Ingrian. However some linguists have claimed that it is a dialect of Ingrian and some classify it as a mixed language In the past Kukkuzi has also sometimes been classified as a Finnish dialect.

According to Tiit-Rein Viitso, the Kukkuzi dialect was originally a Northern Finnic dialect (related to Finnish, Ingrian, Karelian and Veps) that was influenced by Votic and later the Lower Luga dialect of Ingrian.

== Phonology ==
- The sound ⟨õ⟩ exists in Votic but is absent in the Kukkuzi dialect.
- Some other features of the Kukkuzi dialect are the absence of the sound changes ⟨k⟩ > ⟨tš⟩ and s > ťś.
- The sound k sometimes becomes k' after a front vowel.

== Samples ==
tässä müü vassa ensimmäissä kertaa kuulimma, että müü oomma neitä vad'd'alaisiita.

'here we just for the first time heard, that we are Votians.'

lehmääk'ää 'with a cow'.
