= Kreevins =

Historical Votian subgroup of Latvia

Total population
- Few people with historic Krevin ancestry still identify with Votes.

Regions with significant populations
- Latvia

Languages
- Votic (Krevinian), Latvian

Religion
- Christianity

Related ethnic groups
- Votes

Kreevins (Latvian: krieviņi) were Votes who lived in the proximity of Latvian town of Bauska and spoke their own dialect of Votic. In the middle of the 19th century they merged with the surrounding Latvians, although many traditional aspects of Votic culture are still preserved. The name krieviņi means "little Russians" (diminutive form) in Latvian due to their equally foreign-sounding language to Latvians.

== History ==
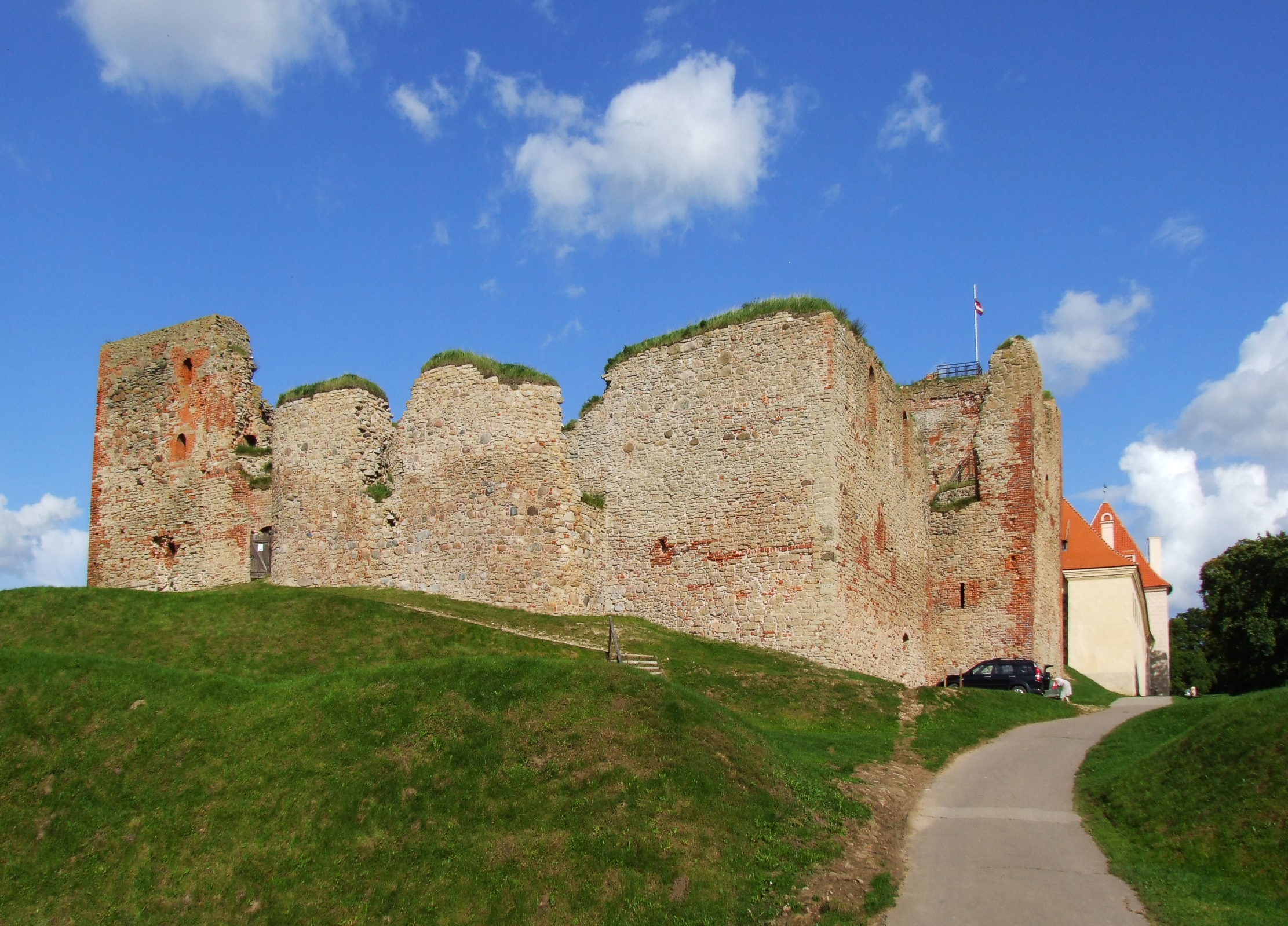
Bauska Castle

The ancestors of the Kreevins were Votes who originally lived in Ingria. Vincke von Overbeg of the Teutonic Order took about 3,000 Votic prisoners of war during his attack of Ingria in 1444–1447. They were transferred to be used as laborers during the construction of Bauska Castle. Before this, virtually whole of Semigalian population moved to Lithuania in 1290 (The Rhymed Chronicle claims 100,000 migrated to Lithuania at once) and the later plague had killed many of the rest original inhabitants. When the castle was finished, the Votes settled the area and became farmers. The first written record of them dates from 1636. In 1805, there were estimated 1,200 Kreevins in Bauska and its surroundings, but according to local priest Karl Lutzau, five years later there were only 12–15 persons who could still speak Votic, all of whom were elders. Anders Johan Sjögren made a research trip to the area in 1846, and concluded that Votic had almost disappeared from the region. After this there are no records from living Kreevins. Ferdinand Johan Wiedemann, in 1871, was the first to prove a link between Votes and Kreevins.

== Culture ==
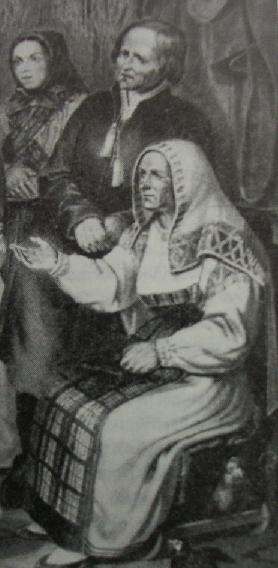
Kreevin couple in their national dresses, drawn by M. de Pauly

Many early ethnologists noted the distinctive clothing of Kreevins. Many of the clothing types used by Kreevins were also in use in Ingria. Men's clothing (kiut or kiuting) was embroidered with blue and red thread. Men's shirts were fastened with ribbon instead of buttons. Men also wore jackets (viita, viite, viiten) made of woolen fabric, possibly copied from Estonian immigrants who also lived in the area. Typical Latvian clothing was also used. Kreevin women used headscarves similar to those used by Votes and Izhorians in Ingria. A decorated scarf was often worn on top of the headscarf. Younger girls had their hair plaited.

=== Language ===
Language sample
Lords Prayer
Meģģi ise taiwâs!
jadku elka śiwu śenna
tulap meģģi tiwi śivu riikki!
Śiwu meelle se iggau ka kui taiwâs ni kans ma bēli!
Meģģi arma leipe anna meli tennawa.
Ġedde meggi padudd, kui me jattim umili nisi meli jad!
Elas meite kurja sad.
Śewon wodse kurģe miusse erre
Jo siula kalpap śiwu kikki śiwu appi un śiwu üwiwi śewonśe śewonśe.
Amen!

== People ==
Latvian poet Rainis and Latvian actor Uldis Dumpis have Kreevin ancestry.
