= List of endangered languages in Europe =

Language Endangerment Status by UNESCO Atlas of the World's Languages in Danger category

Extinct (EX)
- Extinct (EX): (lists)

Endangered
- Critically Endangered (CR); Severely Endangered (SE); Definitely Endangered (DE); Vulnerable (VU): (list); (list); (list); (list)

Safe
- Safe (NE): no list
- Other categories
- Revived (RE); Constructed (CL): (list); (list)
- Related topics: Atlas of the World's Languages in Danger; Endangered Languages Project; Ethnologue; Unclassified language; List of languages by total number of speakers
- UNESCO Atlas of the World's; Languages in Danger categories

An endangered language is a language that is at risk of falling out of use, generally because it has few surviving speakers. If it loses all of its native speakers, it becomes an extinct language. A language may be endangered in one area but show signs of revitalisation in another, as with the Irish language.

== Levels of language endangerment ==
The United Nations Educational, Scientific and Cultural Organization defines four levels of language endangerment between "safe" (not endangered) and "extinct":

- Vulnerable - "most children speak the language, but it may be restricted to certain domains (e.g., home)"
- Definitely endangered - "children no longer learn the language as mother tongue in the home"
- Severely endangered - "language is spoken by grandparents and older generations; while the parent generation may understand it, they do not speak it to children or among themselves"
- Critically endangered - "the youngest speakers are grandparents and older, and they speak the language partially and infrequently"
- Extinct - "there are no speakers left; included in the Atlas if presumably extinct since the 1950s"

The list below includes the findings from the third edition of Atlas of the World's Languages in Danger (2010; formerly the Red Book of Endangered Languages), as well as the online edition of that publication, both published by UNESCO.

== List of languages ==
Language	Status	Speakers	Notes	ISO 639-3
Albania
Aromanian	Definitely endangered	210,000	Also spoken in: Bulgaria, Greece, North Macedonia, Serbia, Kosovo	rup
Judezmo	Severely endangered	60,000	Also spoken in: Algeria, Bosnia and Herzegovina, Bulgaria, Croatia, Greece, North Macedonia, Morocco, Romania, Serbia, Turkey	lad
Romani	Definitely endangered	3,500,000	Also spoken in: Austria, Belarus, Bosnia and Herzegovina, Bulgaria, Croatia, Czech Republic, Estonia, Finland, France, Germany, Greece, Hungary, Italy, Latvia, Lithuania, North Macedonia, Montenegro, Netherlands, Poland, Romania, Russia, Serbia, Slovakia, Slovenia, Switzerland, Turkey, Ukraine, United Kingdom	rmc, rmf, rml, rmn, rmo, rmw, rmy
Torlakian	Vulnerable	1,500,000	Also spoken in: Bulgaria, North Macedonia, Romania, Serbia	hbs
Armenia
Pontic Greek	Definitely endangered	778,000	Also spoken in: Georgia, Greece, Russia, Turkey, Ukraine	pnt
Suret	Definitely endangered	650,000–1,000,000	Also spoken in: Iran, Iraq, Syria, Turkey	aii, cld
Austria
Alemannic	Vulnerable	7,162,000	Also spoken in: France, Germany, Italy, Liechtenstein, Switzerland	gsw, swg, wae
Bavarian	Vulnerable	14,089,000	Also spoken in: Czech Republic, Germany, Hungary, Italy, Switzerland	bar
Burgenland Croatian	Definitely endangered	50,000–60,000	Also spoken in: Hungary, Slovakia	
Romani	Definitely endangered	3,500,000	Also spoken in: Albania, Czech Republic, Belarus, Bosnia and Herzegovina, Bulgaria, Croatia, Estonia, Finland, France, Germany, Greece, Hungary, Italy, Latvia, Lithuania, North Macedonia, Montenegro, Netherlands, Poland, Romania, Russia, Serbia, Slovakia, Slovenia, Switzerland, Turkey, Ukraine, United Kingdom	rmc, rmf, rml, rmn, rmo, rmw, rmy
Yiddish	Definitely endangered	1,510,000	Also spoken in: Belarus, Belgium, Czech Republic, Denmark, Estonia, Finland, France, Germany, Hungary, Israel, Italy, Latvia, Lithuania, Luxembourg, Moldova, Netherlands, Norway, Poland, Romania, Russia, Slovakia, Sweden, Switzerland, Ukraine, United Kingdom	ydd
Azerbaijan
Budukh	Severely endangered	200		bdk
Juhuri	Definitely endangered	101,000	Caucasus. Also spoken in: Russia	jdt
Khinalug	Severely endangered	3,000		kjj
Kryz	Severely endangered	5,000		kry
Lezgian	Vulnerable	800,000	Also spoken in: Russia	lez
Rutul	Definitely endangered	36,400	Also spoken in: Russia	rut
Talysh	Vulnerable	912,000	Also spoken in: Iran	tly
Tat	Severely endangered	28,000		ttt
Tsakhur	Definitely endangered	22,300	Also spoken in: Russia	tkr
Udi	Severely endangered	6,160	(Azerbaijan)	udi
Belarus
Belarusian	Vulnerable	5,058,400	Also spoken in: Belarus, Latvia, Lithuania, Poland, Russia, Ukraine	bel
Polesian	Vulnerable	Unknown	Also spoken in: Poland, Ukraine	
Romani	Definitely endangered	3,500,000	Also spoken in: Albania, Austria, Bosnia and Herzegovina, Bulgaria, Croatia, Czech Republic, Estonia, Finland, France, Germany, Greece, Hungary, Italy, Latvia, Lithuania, North Macedonia, Montenegro, Netherlands, Poland, Romania, Russia, Serbia, Slovakia, Slovenia, Switzerland, Turkey, Ukraine, United Kingdom	rmc, rmf, rml, rmn, rmo, rmw, rmy
Yiddish	Definitely endangered	1,510,000	Also spoken in: Austria, Belgium, Czech Republic, Denmark, Estonia, Finland, France, Germany, Hungary, Italy, Latvia, Lithuania, Luxembourg, Moldova, Norway, Netherlands, Poland, Romania, Russia, Slovakia, Sweden, Switzerland, Ukraine, United Kingdom	ydd
Belgium
Champenois	Severely endangered	Unknown	Also spoken in: France	fra
Limburgian-Ripuarian	Vulnerable	1,300,000	Also spoken in: Germany, Netherlands	ksh, lim
Lorrain	Severely endangered	Unknown	Also spoken in: France	fra
Moselle Franconian	Vulnerable	Unknown	Also spoken in: France, Germany, Luxembourg	ltz
Picard	Severely endangered	700,000	Also spoken in: France	pcd
Walloon	Definitely endangered	600,000	Also spoken in: France, Luxembourg	wln
West Flemish	Vulnerable	1,400,000	Also spoken in: France, Netherlands	vls, zea
Bosnia and Herzegovina
Judezmo	Severely endangered	60,000	Also spoken in: Albania, Algeria, Bulgaria, Croatia, Greece, North Macedonia, Morocco, Romania, Serbia, Turkey	lad
Romani	Definitely endangered	3,500,000	Also spoken in: Albania, Austria, Belarus, Bulgaria, Croatia, Czech Republic, Estonia, Finland, France, Germany, Greece, Hungary, Italy, Latvia, Lithuania, North Macedonia, Montenegro, Netherlands, Poland, Romania, Russia, Serbia, Slovakia, Slovenia, Switzerland, Turkey, Ukraine, United Kingdom	rmc, rmf, rml, rmn, rmo, rmw, rmy
Bulgaria
Aromanian	Definitely endangered	210,000	Also spoken in: Albania, Greece, North Macedonia, Serbia	rup
Crimean Tatar	Severely endangered	580,000	(Dobruja). Also spoken in: Romania, Russia, Ukraine	crh, jct
Deli Orman Gagauz	Critically endangered	148,720	(Deli Orman)	bgx, gag
Judezmo	Severely endangered	60,000	Also spoken in: Albania, Algeria, Bosnia and Herzegovina, Croatia, Greece, North Macedonia, Morocco, Romania, Serbia, Turkey	lad
Maritime Gagauz	Severely endangered	148,720	(Maritime). Also spoken in: Romania	bgx, gag
Romani	Definitely endangered	3,500,000	Also spoken in: Albania, Austria, Belarus, Bosnia and Herzegovina, Croatia, Estonia, Finland, France, Germany, Greece, Hungary, Italy, Latvia, Lithuania, North Macedonia, Montenegro, Netherlands, Poland, Romania, Russia, Serbia, Slovakia, Slovenia, Switzerland, Czech Republic, Turkey, Ukraine, United Kingdom	rmc, rmf, rml, rmn, rmo, rmw, rmy
Torlakian	Vulnerable	1,500,000	Also spoken in: Albania, North Macedonia, Romania, Serbia	hbs
Croatia
Arbanasi	Severely endangered	Unknown		
Istriot	Severely endangered	1,300		ist
Istro-Romanian	Severely endangered	1,400		ruo
Judezmo	Severely endangered	60,000	Also spoken in: Albania, Algeria, Bosnia and Herzegovina, Bulgaria, Greece, North Macedonia, Morocco, Romania, Serbia, Turkey	lad
Romani	Definitely endangered	3,500,000	Also spoken in: Albania, Austria, Belarus, Bosnia and Herzegovina, Bulgaria, Czech Republic, Estonia, Finland, France, Germany, Greece, Hungary, Italy, Latvia, Lithuania, North Macedonia, Montenegro, Netherlands, Poland, Romania, Russia, Serbia, Slovakia, Slovenia, Switzerland, Turkey, Ukraine, United Kingdom	rmc, rmf, rml, rmn, rmo, rmw, rmy
Venetian	Vulnerable	3,900,000	Also spoken in: Italy, Slovenia	vec
Vojvodina Rusyn	Definitely endangered	Unknown	Also spoken in: Serbia	
Cyprus
Cypriot Arabic	Severely endangered	9,800		acy
Cypriot Greek	Vulnerable	9,999		
Czech Republic
Bavarian	Vulnerable	14,089,000	Also spoken in: Austria, Germany, Hungary, Italy, Switzerland	bar
East Franconian	Vulnerable	4,900,000	Also spoken in: Germany	vmf
Romani	Definitely endangered	3,500,000	Also spoken in: Albania, Austria, Belarus, Bosnia and Herzegovina, Bulgaria, Croatia, Estonia, Finland, France, Germany, Greece, Hungary, Italy, Latvia, Lithuania, North Macedonia, Montenegro, Netherlands, Poland, Romania, Russia, Serbia, Slovakia, Slovenia, Switzerland, Turkey, Ukraine, United Kingdom	rmc, rmf, rml, rmn, rmo, rmw, rmy
Yiddish	Definitely endangered	1,510,000	Also spoken in: Austria, Belarus, Belgium, Denmark, Estonia, Finland, France, Germany, Hungary, Italy, Latvia, Lithuania, Luxembourg, Moldova, Norway, Netherlands, Poland, Romania, Russia, Slovakia, Sweden, Switzerland, Ukraine, United Kingdom	ydd
Denmark
Faroese	Vulnerable	72,000		fao
Low Saxon	Vulnerable	2,200,000	Also spoken in: Germany, Netherlands, Russia	act, drt, frs, gos, nds, sdz, stl, twd, vel, wep
Scanian	Vulnerable	Unknown	Also spoken in: Sweden	swe
South Jutlandic	Definitely endangered	Unknown	Also spoken in: Germany	jut
Yiddish	Definitely endangered	1,510,000	Also spoken in: Austria, Belarus, Belgium, Czech Republic, Estonia, Finland, France, Germany, Hungary, Italy, Latvia, Lithuania, Luxembourg, Moldova, Norway, Netherlands, Poland, Romania, Russia, Slovakia, Sweden, Switzerland, Ukraine, United Kingdom	ydd
Estonia
Romani	Definitely endangered	3,500,000	Also spoken in: Albania, Austria, Belarus, Bosnia and Herzegovina, Bulgaria, Czech Republic, Croatia, Finland, France, Germany, Greece, Hungary, Italy, Latvia, Lithuania, North Macedonia, Montenegro, Netherlands, Poland, Romania, Russia, Serbia, Slovakia, Slovenia, Switzerland, Turkey, Ukraine, United Kingdom	rmc, rmf, rml, rmn, rmo, rmw, rmy
Võro-Seto	Definitely endangered	133,680	Also spoken in: Russia	est
Yiddish	Definitely endangered	1,510,000	Also spoken in: Austria, Belarus, Belgium, Czech Republic, Denmark, Finland, France, Germany, Hungary, Italy, Latvia, Lithuania, Luxembourg, Moldova, Norway, Netherlands, Poland, Romania, Russia, Slovakia, Sweden, Switzerland, Ukraine, United Kingdom	ydd
Finland
Inari Sámi	Severely endangered	400		smn
Karelian	Definitely endangered	19,753	Also spoken in: Russia	krl
North Saami	Definitely endangered	25,000	Also spoken in: Norway, Russia, Sweden	sme
Olonetsian	Definitely endangered	14,100–25,000	Also spoken in: Russia	olo
Romani	Definitely endangered	3,500,000	Also spoken in: Albania, Austria, Belarus, Bosnia and Herzegovina, Bulgaria, Croatia, Czech Republic, Estonia, France, Germany, Greece, Hungary, Italy, Latvia, Lithuania, North Macedonia, Montenegro, Netherlands, Poland, Romania, Russia, Serbia, Slovakia, Slovenia, Switzerland, Turkey, Ukraine, United Kingdom	rmc, rmf, rml, rmn, rmo, rmw, rmy
Skolt Saami	Severely endangered	350	Also spoken in: Norway, Russia	sms
Yiddish	Definitely endangered	1,510,000	Also spoken in: Austria, Belarus, Belgium, Czech Republic, Denmark, Estonia, France, Germany, Hungary, Italy, Latvia, Lithuania, Luxembourg, Moldova, Norway, Netherlands, Poland, Romania, Russia, Slovakia, Sweden, Switzerland, Ukraine, United Kingdom	ydd
France
Alemannic	Vulnerable	7,162,000	Also spoken in: Austria, Germany, Italy, Liechtenstein, Switzerland	gsw, swg, wae
Alpine Provençal	Definitely endangered	Unknown	Also spoken in: Italy	oci
Auvergnat	Severely endangered	80,000		oci
Basque	Vulnerable	751,000	Also spoken in: Spain	eus
Breton	Severely endangered	207,000		bre
Burgundian	Severely endangered	50,000		fra
Champenois	Severely endangered	Unknown	Also spoken in: Belgium	fra
Corsican	Definitely endangered	150,000	Also spoken in: Italy	cos
Frainc-Comtou	Severely endangered	Unknown	Also spoken in: Switzerland	fra
Franco-Provençal	Definitely endangered	157,000	Also spoken in: Italy, Switzerland	frp
Gallo	Severely endangered	191,000		fra
Gascon	Definitely endangered	Unknown	Also spoken in: Spain	oci
Languedocien	Severely endangered	5,000		oci
Ligurian	Definitely endangered	600,000	Also spoken in: Italy, Monaco	lij
Limousin	Severely endangered	10,000		oci
Lorrain	Severely endangered	Unknown	Also spoken in: Belgium	fra
Moselle Franconian	Vulnerable	Unknown	Also spoken in: Belgium, Germany, Luxembourg	ltz
Norman	Severely endangered	20,000		nrn
Picard	Severely endangered	700,000	Also spoken in: Belgium	pcd
Poitevin-Saintongeais	Severely endangered	200,000–300,000		fra
Provençal	Severely endangered	350,000		oci
Rhenish Franconian	Vulnerable	Unknown	Also spoken in: Germany	pfl
Romani	Definitely endangered	3,500,000	Also spoken in: Albania, Austria, Belarus, Bosnia and Herzegovina, Bulgaria, Croatia, Czech Republic, Estonia, Finland, Germany, Greece, Hungary, Italy, Latvia, Lithuania, North Macedonia, Montenegro, Netherlands, Poland, Romania, Russia, Serbia, Slovakia, Slovenia, Switzerland, Turkey, Ukraine, United Kingdom	rmc, rmf, rml, rmn, rmo, rmw, rmy
Walloon	Definitely endangered	600,000	Also spoken in: Belgium, Luxembourg	wln
West Flemish	Vulnerable	1,400,000	Also spoken in: Belgium, Netherlands	vls, zea
Yiddish	Definitely endangered	1,510,000	Also spoken in: Austria, Belarus, Belgium, Czech Republic, Denmark, Estonia, Finland, Germany, Hungary, Italy, Latvia, Lithuania, Luxembourg, Moldova, Norway, Netherlands, Poland, Romania, Russia, Slovakia, Sweden, Switzerland, Ukraine, United Kingdom	ydd
Georgia
Abkhaz	Vulnerable	190,000	Also spoken in: Russia, Turkey	abk
Bats	Severely endangered	500		bbl
Bohtan Neo-Aramaic	Severely endangered	<500	Also spoken in: Russia	bhn
Homshetsma	Severely endangered	Unknown	(Caucasus). Also spoken in: Russia	hye
Laz	Definitely endangered	22,000	Also spoken in: Turkey	lzz
Mingrelian	Definitely endangered	344,000		xmf
Ossete	Vulnerable	597,450	Also spoken in: Russia	oss
Pontic Greek	Definitely endangered	778,000	Also spoken in: Armenia, Greece, Russia, Turkey, Ukraine	pnt
Svan	Definitely endangered	14,000		sva
Udi	Severely endangered	6,160	(Georgia) .	udi
Urum	Definitely endangered	190,000	Also spoken in: Russia, Ukraine	uum
Germany
Alemannic	Vulnerable	7,162,000	Also spoken in: Austria, France, Italy, Liechtenstein, Switzerland	gsw, swg, wae
Bavarian	Vulnerable	14,089,000	Also spoken in: Austria, Czech Republic, Hungary, Italy, Switzerland	bar
East Franconian	Vulnerable	4,900,000	Also spoken in: Czech Republic	vmf
Ripuarian	Vulnerable	250,000	Also spoken in: Belgium, Netherlands	ksh
Low Saxon	Vulnerable	2,200,000	Also spoken in: Denmark, Netherlands, Russia	act, drt, frs, gos, nds, sdz, stl, twd, vel, wep
Moselle Franconian	Vulnerable	Unknown	Also spoken in: Belgium, France, Luxembourg	ltz
North Frisian	Severely endangered	10,000		frr
Rhenish Franconian	Vulnerable	Unknown	Also spoken in: France	pfl
Romani	Definitely endangered	3,500,000	Also spoken in: Albania, Austria, Belarus, Bosnia and Herzegovina, Bulgaria, Croatia, Czech Republic, Estonia, Finland, France, Greece, Hungary, Italy, Latvia, Lithuania, North Macedonia, Montenegro, Netherlands, Poland, Romania, Russia, Serbia, Slovakia, Slovenia, Switzerland, Turkey, Ukraine, United Kingdom	rmc, rmf, rml, rmn, rmo, rmw, rmy
Saterland Frisian	Severely endangered	2,000		stq
Sorbian	Definitely endangered	19,900		dsb, hsb
South Jutlandic	Definitely endangered	Unknown	Also spoken in: Denmark	jut
Yiddish	Definitely endangered	1,510,000	Also spoken in: Austria, Belarus, Belgium, Czech Republic, Denmark, Estonia, Finland, France, Hungary, Italy, Latvia, Lithuania, Luxembourg, Moldova, Norway, Netherlands, Poland, Romania, Russia, Slovakia, Sweden, Switzerland, Ukraine, United Kingdom	ydd
Greece
Aromanian	Definitely endangered	210,000	Also spoken in: Albania, Bulgaria, North Macedonia, Serbia	rup
Arvanitika	Severely endangered	50,000		aat
Cappadocian Greek	Critically endangered	2,800		cpg
Corfiot Italkian	Critically endangered	250		
Gagauz (South Balkans)	Severely endangered	148,720	(South Balkans) . Also spoken in: North Macedonia, Turkey	bgx, gag
Judezmo	Severely endangered	60,000	Also spoken in: Albania, Algeria, Bosnia and Herzegovina, Bulgaria, Croatia, North Macedonia, Morocco, Romania, Serbia, Turkey	lad
Megleno-Romanian	Severely endangered	5,000	Also spoken in: North Macedonia	ruq
Pontic Greek	Definitely endangered	778,000	Also spoken in: Armenia, Georgia, Russia, Turkey, Ukraine	pnt
Romani	Definitely endangered	3,500,000	Also spoken in: Albania, Austria, Belarus, Bosnia and Herzegovina, Bulgaria, Croatia, Czech Republic, Estonia, Finland, France, Germany, Hungary, Italy, Latvia, Lithuania, North Macedonia, Montenegro, Netherlands, Poland, Romania, Russia, Serbia, Slovakia, Slovenia, Switzerland, Turkey, Ukraine, United Kingdom	rmc, rmf, rml, rmn, rmo, rmw, rmy
Tsakonian	Critically endangered	2,000–4,000		tsd
Hungary
Bavarian	Vulnerable	14,089,000	Also spoken in: Austria, Czech Republic, Germany, Italy, Switzerland	bar
Burgenland Croatian	Definitely endangered	50,000–60,000	Also spoken in: Austria, Slovakia	hbs
Romani	Definitely endangered	3,500,000	Also spoken in: Albania, Austria, Belarus, Bosnia and Herzegovina, Bulgaria, Croatia, Czech Republic, Estonia, Finland, France, Germany, Greece, Italy, Latvia, Lithuania, North Macedonia, Montenegro, Netherlands, Poland, Romania, Russia, Serbia, Slovakia, Slovenia, Switzerland, Turkey, Ukraine, United Kingdom	rmc, rmf, rml, rmn, rmo, rmw, rmy
Rusyn	Vulnerable	70,000	Also spoken in: Poland, Romania, Slovakia, Ukraine	rue
Yiddish	Definitely endangered	1,510,000	Also spoken in: Austria, Belarus, Belgium, Czech Republic, Denmark, Estonia, Finland, France, Germany, Italy, Latvia, Lithuania, Luxembourg, Moldova, Norway, Netherlands, Poland, Romania, Russia, Slovakia, Sweden, Switzerland, Ukraine, United Kingdom	ydd
Ireland
Irish	Definitely endangered	170,000-1,760,000	Also spoken in: United Kingdom	gle
Shelta	Critically endangered	50,000		sth
Italy
Alemannic	Vulnerable	7,162,000	Also spoken in: Austria, France, Germany, Liechtenstein, Switzerland	gsw, swg, wae
Algherese (Catalan)	Definitely endangered	Unknown		cat
Alpine Provençal	Definitely endangered	Unknown	Also spoken in: France	oci
Arbëresh	Definitely endangered	100,000		aae
Bavarian	Vulnerable	14,089,000	Also spoken in: Austria, Czech Republic, Germany, Hungary, Switzerland	bar
Cimbrian	Definitely endangered	400		cim
Corsican	Definitely endangered	150,000	Also spoken in: France	cos
Emilian	Definitely endangered	c. 1,300,000		egl
Faetar	Severely endangered	<1,000	An outlying dialect of Francoprovençal	frp
Franco-Provençal	Definitely endangered	157,000	Also spoken in: France, Switzerland	frp
Friulian	Definitely endangered	600,000		fur
Gallo-Italic of Sicily	Definitely endangered	60,000		lmo
Gallurese	Definitely endangered	100,000	An outlying dialect of Corsican, yet listed as being part of Sardinian by UNESCO	sdn
Gardiol	Severely endangered	Unknown	An outlying dialect of Alpine Provençal	
Griko	Definitely endangered	20,000	An outlying dialect of Greek spoken in Calabria and Salento	ell
Ladin	Definitely endangered	41,100		lld
Ligurian	Definitely endangered	600,000	Also spoken in: France, Monaco	lij
Lombard	Definitely endangered	3,800,000	Also spoken in: Switzerland	lmo
Mòcheno	Definitely endangered	1,900	An outlying dialect of Bavarian	mhn
Molise Croatian	Severely endangered	1,000		svm
Neapolitan	Vulnerable	5,700,000		nap
Piedmontese	Definitely endangered	2,000,000		pms
Resian	Severely endangered	929	An outlying dialect of Slovene	slv
Romagnol	Definitely endangered	430,000	Also spoken in: San Marino	rgn
Romani	Definitely endangered	3,500,000	Also spoken in: Albania, Austria, Belarus, Bosnia and Herzegovina, Bulgaria, Croatia, Czech Republic, Estonia, Finland, France, Germany, Greece, Hungary, Latvia, Lithuania, North Macedonia, Montenegro, Netherlands, Poland, Romania, Russia, Serbia, Slovakia, Slovenia, Switzerland, Turkey, Ukraine, United Kingdom	rmc, rmf, rml, rmn, rmo, rmw, rmy
Sardinian	Definitely endangered	1,000,000		src, sro
Sassarese	Definitely endangered	100,000	An outlying dialect of Corsican, yet listed as being part of Sardinian by UNESCO	sdc
Sicilian	Vulnerable	4,700,000		scn
South Tyrolean German	Vulnerable	300,000		bar
Swabian German	Severely endangered	820,000		swg
Swiss German	Definitely endangered	4,930,000		gsw
Töitschu	Severely endangered	22,780	An outlying dialect of Alemannic	gsw, swg, wae
Venetian	Vulnerable	3,900,000	Also spoken in: Croatia, Slovenia	vec
Walser	Severely endangered	22,780		wae
Yiddish	Definitely endangered	1,510,000	Also spoken in: Austria, Belarus, Belgium, Czech Republic, Denmark, Estonia, Finland, France, Germany, Hungary, Latvia, Lithuania, Luxembourg, Moldova, Norway, Netherlands, Poland, Romania, Russia, Slovakia, Sweden, Switzerland, Ukraine, United Kingdom	ydd
Kazakhstan
Dungan	Definitely endangered	110,000	Also spoken in: Kyrgyzstan	dng
Latvia
Belarusian	Vulnerable	5,058,400	Also spoken in: Belarus, Lithuania, Poland, Russia, Ukraine	bel
Latgalian	Vulnerable	200,000	Also spoken in: Russia	lav
Livonian	Critically endangered	250		liv
Romani	Definitely endangered	3,500,000	Also spoken in: Albania, Austria, Belarus, Bosnia and Herzegovina, Bulgaria, Croatia, Czech Republic, Estonia, Finland, France, Germany, Greece, Hungary, Italy, Lithuania, North Macedonia, Montenegro, Netherlands, Poland, Romania, Russia, Serbia, Slovakia, Slovenia, Switzerland, Turkey, Ukraine, United Kingdom	rmc, rmf, rml, rmn, rmo, rmw, rmy
Yiddish	Definitely endangered	1,510,000	Also spoken in: Austria, Belarus, Belgium, Czech Republic, Denmark, Estonia, Finland, France, Germany, Hungary, Italy, Lithuania, Luxembourg, Moldova, Norway, Netherlands, Poland, Romania, Russia, Slovakia, Sweden, Switzerland, Ukraine, United Kingdom	ydd
Liechtenstein
Alemannic	Vulnerable	7,162,000	Also spoken in: Austria, France, Germany, Italy, Switzerland	gsw, swg, wae
Lithuania
Belarusian	Vulnerable	5,058,400	Also spoken in: Belarus, Latvia, Poland, Russia, Ukraine	bel
Karaim	Severely endangered	80	(Lithuania).	kdr
Romani	Definitely endangered	3,500,000	Also spoken in: Albania, Austria, Belarus, Bosnia and Herzegovina, Bulgaria, Croatia, Czech Republic, Estonia, Finland, France, Germany, Greece, Hungary, Italy, Latvia, North Macedonia, Montenegro, Netherlands, Poland, Romania, Russia, Serbia, Slovakia, Slovenia, Switzerland, Turkey, Ukraine, United Kingdom	rmc, rmf, rml, rmn, rmo, rmw, rmy
Yiddish	Definitely endangered	1,510,000	Also spoken in: Austria, Belarus, Belgium, Czech Republic, Denmark, Estonia, Finland, France, Germany, Hungary, Italy, Latvia, Luxembourg, Moldova, Norway, Netherlands, Poland, Romania, Russia, Slovakia, Sweden, Switzerland, Ukraine, United Kingdom	ydd
Luxembourg
Luxembourgish	Vulnerable	430,000	Also spoken in: Belgium, France, Germany	ltz
Walloon	Definitely endangered	600,000	Also spoken in: Belgium, France	wln
Yiddish	Definitely endangered	1,510,000	Also spoken in: Austria, Belarus, Belgium, Czech Republic, Denmark, Estonia, Finland, France, Germany, Hungary, Italy, Latvia, Lithuania, Moldova, Norway, Netherlands, Poland, Romania, Russia, Slovakia, Sweden, Switzerland, Ukraine, United Kingdom	ydd
Moldova
Gagauz (Bessarabia)	Critically endangered	148,720	Also spoken in: Bulgaria, Romania, Russia, Ukraine	bgx, gag
Monaco
Ligurian	Definitely endangered	600,000	Also spoken in: France, Italy	lij
Montenegro
Romani	Definitely endangered	3,500,000	Also spoken in: Albania, Austria, Belarus, Bosnia and Herzegovina, Bulgaria, Croatia, Czech Republic, Estonia, Finland, France, Germany, Greece, Hungary, Italy, Latvia, Lithuania, North Macedonia, Netherlands, Poland, Romania, Russia, Serbia, Slovakia, Slovenia, Switzerland, Turkey, Ukraine, United Kingdom	rmc, rmf, rml, rmn, rmo, rmw, rmy
Netherlands
Limburgish	Vulnerable	1,300,000	Also spoken in: Belgium, Germany	lim
Low Saxon	Vulnerable	2,200,000	Also spoken in: Denmark, Germany, Russia	act, drt, frs, gos, nds, sdz, stl, twd, vel, wep
Romani	Definitely endangered	3,500,000	Also spoken in: Albania, Austria, Belarus, Bosnia and Herzegovina, Bulgaria, Croatia, Czech Republic, Estonia, Finland, France, Germany, Greece, Hungary, Italy, Latvia, Lithuania, North Macedonia, Montenegro, Poland, Romania, Russia, Serbia, Slovakia, Slovenia, Switzerland, Turkey, Ukraine, United Kingdom	rmc, rmf, rml, rmn, rmo, rmw, rmy
West Flemish	Vulnerable	1,400,000	Also spoken in: Belgium, France	vls, zea
West Frisian	Vulnerable	470,000		fry
Yiddish	Definitely endangered	1,510,000	Also spoken in: Austria, Belarus, Belgium, Czech Republic, Denmark, Estonia, Finland, France, Germany, Hungary, Italy, Latvia, Lithuania, Luxembourg, Moldova, Norway, Poland, Romania, Russia, Slovakia, Sweden, Switzerland, Ukraine, United Kingdom	ydd
North Macedonia
Aromanian	Definitely endangered	210,000	Also spoken in: Albania, Bulgaria, Greece, Serbia	rup
Megleno-Romanian	Severely endangered	5,000	Also spoken in: Greece	ruq
Romani	Definitely endangered	3,500,000	Also spoken in: Albania, Austria, Belarus, Bosnia and Herzegovina, Bulgaria, Croatia, Czech Republic, Estonia, Finland, France, Germany, Greece, Hungary, Italy, Latvia, Lithuania, Montenegro, Netherlands, Poland, Romania, Russia, Serbia, Slovakia, Slovenia, Switzerland, Turkey, Ukraine, United Kingdom	rmc, rmf, rml, rmn, rmo, rmw, rmy
Norway
Lule Sámi	Severely endangered	650	Also spoken in: Sweden	smj
North Saami	Definitely endangered	25,000	Also spoken in: Finland, Russia, Sweden	sme
Pite Sámi	Critically endangered	Unknown	Also spoken in: Sweden	sje
Skolt Saami	Severely endangered	350	Also spoken in: Finland, Russia	sms
Southern Sámi	Severely endangered	600	Also spoken in: Sweden	sma
Yiddish	Definitely endangered	1,510,000	Also spoken in: Austria, Belarus, Belgium, Czech Republic, Denmark, Estonia, Finland, France, Germany, Hungary, Italy, Latvia, Lithuania, Luxembourg, Moldova, Netherlands, Poland, Romania, Russia, Slovakia, Sweden, Switzerland, Ukraine, United Kingdom	ydd
Poland
Belarusian	Vulnerable	5,058,400	Also spoken in: Belarus, Latvia, Lithuania, Russia, Ukraine	bel
Silesian	Definitely endangered	500,000	Also spoken in: Czechia, Germany, USA	szl
Kashubian	Severely endangered	108,000	Also spoken in: Canada	csb
Polesian	Vulnerable	Unknown	Also spoken in: Belarus, Ukraine	
Romani	Definitely endangered	3,500,000	Also spoken in: Albania, Austria, Belarus, Bosnia and Herzegovina, Bulgaria, Croatia, Czech Republic, Estonia, Finland, France, Germany, Greece, Hungary, Italy, Latvia, Lithuania, North Macedonia, Montenegro, Netherlands, Romania, Russia, Serbia, Slovakia, Slovenia, Switzerland, Turkey, Ukraine, United Kingdom	rmc, rmf, rml, rmn, rmo, rmw, rmy
Rusyn	Vulnerable	70,000	Also spoken in: Hungary, Romania, Slovakia, Ukraine	rue
Wymysorys	Severely endangered	20		wym
Yiddish	Definitely endangered	1,510,000	Also spoken in: Austria, Belarus, Belgium, Czech Republic, Denmark, Estonia, Finland, France, Germany, Hungary, Italy, Latvia, Lithuania, Luxembourg, Moldova, Norway, Netherlands, Romania, Russia, Slovakia, Sweden, Switzerland, Ukraine, United Kingdom	ydd
Portugal
Asturian-Leonese	Definitely endangered	Unknown	Also spoken in: Spain	ast, ext, mwl
Romania
Banat Bulgarian	Definitely endangered	Unknown	Also spoken in: Serbia	bul
Crimean Tatar	Severely endangered	580,000	(Dobruja) . Also spoken in: Bulgaria, Russia, Ukraine	crh, jct
Csángó	Severely endangered.	Unknown		hun
Gagauz (Bessarabia)	Severely endangered	148,720	Also spoken in: Bulgaria, Moldova, Russia, Ukraine	bgx, gag
Judezmo	Severely endangered	60,000	Also spoken in: Albania, Algeria, Bosnia and Herzegovina, Bulgaria, Croatia, Greece, North Macedonia, Morocco, Turkey, Serbia	lad
Nogai	Severely endangered	87,000	(Dobruja) .	nog
Romani	Definitely endangered	3,500,000	Also spoken in: Albania, Austria, Belarus, Bosnia and Herzegovina, Bulgaria, Croatia, Czech Republic, Estonia, Finland, France, Germany, Greece, Hungary, Italy, Latvia, Lithuania, North Macedonia, Montenegro, Netherlands, Poland, Russia, Serbia, Slovakia, Slovenia, Switzerland, Turkey, Ukraine, United Kingdom	rmc, rmf, rml, rmn, rmo, rmw, rmy
Rusyn	Vulnerable	70,000	Also spoken in: Hungary, Poland, Slovakia, Ukraine	rue
Torlakian	Vulnerable	1,500,000	Also spoken in: Albania, Bulgaria, North Macedonia, Serbia	hbs
Transylvanian Saxon	Severely endangered	200,000		
Yiddish	Definitely endangered	1,510,000	Also spoken in: Austria, Belarus, Belgium, Czech Republic, Denmark, Estonia, Finland, France, Germany, Hungary, Italy, Latvia, Lithuania, Luxembourg, Moldova, Norway, Netherlands, Poland, Russia, Slovakia, Sweden, Switzerland, Ukraine, United Kingdom	ydd
Russia
San Marino
Romagnol	Definitely endangered	430,000	Also spoken in: Italy	rgn
Serbia
Aromanian	Definitely endangered	210,000	Also spoken in: Albania, Bulgaria, Greece, North Macedonia	rup
Banat Bulgarian	Definitely endangered	Unknown	Also spoken in: Romania	bul
Judezmo	Severely endangered	60,000	Also spoken in: Albania, Algeria, Bosnia and Herzegovina, Bulgaria, Croatia, Greece, North Macedonia, Morocco, Romania, Turkey	lad
Romani	Definitely endangered	3,500,000	Also spoken in: Albania, Austria, Belarus, Bosnia and Herzegovina, Bulgaria, Croatia, Czech Republic, Estonia, Finland, France, Germany, Greece, Hungary, Italy, Latvia, Lithuania, North Macedonia, Montenegro, Netherlands, Poland, Romania, Russia, Slovakia, Slovenia, Switzerland, Turkey, Ukraine, United Kingdom	rmc, rmf, rml, rmn, rmo, rmw, rmy
Torlakian	Vulnerable	1,500,000	Also spoken in: Albania, Bulgaria, North Macedonia, Romania	hbs
Vojvodina Rusyn	Definitely endangered	8,725	Also spoken in: Croatia	
Slovakia
Burgenland Croatian	Definitely endangered	50,000–60,000	Also spoken in: Austria, Hungary	hbs
Eastern Slovak	Vulnerable	Unknown	Also spoken in: Ukraine	slk
Romani	Definitely endangered	3,500,000	Also spoken in: Albania, Austria, Belarus, Bosnia and Herzegovina, Bulgaria, Croatia, Czech Republic, Estonia, Finland, France, Germany, Greece, Hungary, Italy, Latvia, Lithuania, North Macedonia, Montenegro, Netherlands, Poland, Romania, Russia, Serbia, Slovenia, Switzerland, Turkey, Ukraine, United Kingdom	rmc, rmf, rml, rmn, rmo, rmw, rmy
Rusyn	Vulnerable	70,000	Also spoken in: Hungary, Poland, Romania, Ukraine	rue
Yiddish	Definitely endangered	1,510,000	Also spoken in: Austria, Belarus, Belgium, Czech Republic, Denmark, Estonia, Finland, France, Germany, Hungary, Italy, Latvia, Lithuania, Luxembourg, Moldova, Norway, Netherlands, Poland, Romania, Russia, Sweden, Switzerland, Ukraine, United Kingdom	ydd
Slovenia
Gottscheerish	Critically endangered	Unspecified		
Romani	Definitely endangered	3,500,000	Also spoken in: Albania, Austria, Belarus, Bosnia and Herzegovina, Bulgaria, Croatia, Czech Republic, Estonia, Finland, France, Germany, Greece, Hungary, Italy, Latvia, Lithuania, North Macedonia, Montenegro, Netherlands, Poland, Romania, Russia, Serbia, Slovakia, Switzerland, Turkey, Ukraine, United Kingdom	rmc, rmf, rml, rmn, rmo, rmw, rmy
Venetian	Vulnerable	3,900,000	Also spoken in: Croatia, Italy	vec
Spain
Aragonese	Definitely endangered	30,000–50,000		arg
Asturian-Leonese	Definitely endangered	Unknown	Also spoken in: Portugal	ast, ext, mwl
Basque	Vulnerable	751,000	Also spoken in: France	eus
Gascon	Definitely endangered	Unknown	Also spoken in: France	oci
Sweden
Dalecarlian	Definitely endangered	Unknown		swe
Meänkieli	Critically endangered			fit
Modern Gutnish	Definitely endangered	2,000–5,000		swe
Lule Sámi	Severely endangered	650	Also spoken in: Norway	smj
North Saami	Definitely endangered	25,000	Also spoken in: Finland, Norway, Russia	sme
Pite Sámi	Critically endangered	Unknown	Also spoken in: Norway	sje
Scanian	Vulnerable	Unknown		swe
Southern Sámi	Severely endangered	600	Also spoken in: Norway	sma
Ume Sámi	Critically endangered	20		sju
Yiddish	Definitely endangered	1,510,000	Also spoken in: Austria, Belarus, Belgium, Czech Republic, Denmark, Estonia, Finland, France, Germany, Hungary, Italy, Latvia, Lithuania, Luxembourg, Moldova, Norway, Netherlands, Poland, Romania, Russia, Slovakia, Switzerland, Ukraine, United Kingdom	ydd
Switzerland
Alemannic	Vulnerable		Also spoken in: Austria, France, Germany, Italy, Liechtenstein	gsw, swg, wae
Bavarian	Vulnerable	14,089,000	Also spoken in: Austria, Czech Republic, Germany, Hungary, Italy	bar
Frainc-Comtou	Severely endangered	Unknown	Also spoken in: France	fra
Franco-Provençal	Definitely endangered	157,000	Also spoken in: France, Italy	frp
Lombard	Definitely endangered	3,800,000	Also spoken in: Italy	lmo
Romani	Definitely endangered	3,500,000	Also spoken in: Albania, Austria, Belarus, Bosnia and Herzegovina, Bulgaria, Croatia, Czech Republic, Estonia, Finland, France, Germany, Greece, Hungary, Italy, Latvia, Lithuania, North Macedonia, Montenegro, Netherlands, Poland, Romania, Russia, Serbia, Slovakia, Slovenia, Turkey, Ukraine, United Kingdom	rmc, rmf, rml, rmn, rmo, rmw, rmy
Romansh	Definitely endangered	60,000		roh
Yiddish	Definitely endangered	1,510,000	Also spoken in: Austria, Belarus, Belgium, Czech Republic, Denmark, Estonia, Finland, France, Germany, Hungary, Italy, Latvia, Lithuania, Luxembourg, Moldova, Norway, Netherlands, Poland, Romania, Russia, Slovakia, Sweden, Ukraine, United Kingdom	ydd
Turkey
Abaza	Definitely endangered	49,800	Also spoken in: Russia	abq
Abkhaz	Vulnerable	190,000	Also spoken in: Georgia, Russia	abk
Adyghe	Definitely endangered	610,000	Also spoken in: Iraq, Israel, Jordan, North Macedonia, Russia, Syria	ady
Gagauz (South Balkans)	Severely endangered	460,000	(South Balkans) Also spoken in: Greece, North Macedonia	bgx
Homshetsma	Definitely endangered	Unknown		hye
Judezmo	Severely endangered	60,000	Also spoken in: Albania, Algeria, Bosnia and Herzegovina, Bulgaria, Croatia, Greece, North Macedonia, Morocco, Romania, Serbia	lad
Kabard-Cherkes	Vulnerable	590,000	Also spoken in: Russia	kbd
Laz	Definitely endangered	22,000	Also spoken in: Georgia	lzz
Pontic Greek	Definitely endangered	778,000	Also spoken in: Armenia, Georgia, Greece, Russia, Ukraine	pnt
Romani	Definitely endangered	3,500,000	Also spoken in: Albania, Austria, Belarus, Bosnia and Herzegovina, Bulgaria, Croatia, Czech Republic, Estonia, Finland, France, Germany, Greece, Hungary, Italy, Latvia, Lithuania, North Macedonia, Montenegro, Netherlands, Poland, Romania, Russia, Serbia, Slovakia, Slovenia, Switzerland, Ukraine, United Kingdom	rmc, rmf, rml, rmn, rmo, rmw, rmy
Suret	Definitely endangered	650,000–1,000,000	Also spoken in: Armenia, Iran, Iraq, Syria	aii, cld
Western Armenian	Definitely endangered	1,600,000		hye
Zazaki	Vulnerable	3,000,000–4,000,000		zza
Ukraine
Belarusian	Vulnerable	5,058,400	Also spoken in: Belarus, Latvia, Lithuania, Poland, Russia	bel
Crimean Tatar	Severely endangered	580,000	(Crimea). Also spoken in Bulgaria, Romania, Russia	crh, jct
Crimean Turkish	Severely endangered	580,000		
Eastern Slovak	Vulnerable	Unknown	Also spoken in: Slovakia	slk
Gagauz	Definitely endangered	148,720	(Bessarabia). Also spoken in: Moldova	bgx, gag
Karaim	Critically endangered	80	(Western Ukraine)	kdr
Mariupolitan Greek	Severely endangered	Unknown		ell
Nogai	Severely endangered	87,000	(Crimea)	nog
Plautdietsch	Definitely endangered	447,360		pdt
Polesian	Vulnerable	Unknown	Also spoken in: Belarus, Poland	
Pontic Greek	Definitely endangered	778,000	Also spoken in: Armenia, Georgia, Greece, Russia, Turkey	pnt
Romani	Definitely endangered	3,500,000	Also spoken in: Albania, Austria, Belarus, Bosnia and Herzegovina, Bulgaria, Croatia, Czech Republic, Estonia, Finland, France, Germany, Greece, Hungary, Italy, Latvia, Lithuania, North Macedonia, Montenegro, Netherlands, Poland, Romania, Russia, Serbia, Slovakia, Slovenia, Switzerland, Turkey, United Kingdom	rmc, rmf, rml, rmn, rmo, rmw, rmy
Rusyn	Vulnerable	70,000	Also spoken in: Hungary, Poland, Romania, Slovakia	rue
Urum	Definitely endangered	190,000	Also spoken in: Georgia, Russia	uum
Yiddish	Definitely endangered	1,510,000	Also spoken in: Austria, Belarus, Belgium, Czech Republic, Denmark, Estonia, Finland, France, Germany, Hungary, Italy, Latvia, Lithuania, Luxembourg, Moldova, Norway, Netherlands, Poland, Romania, Russia, Slovakia, Sweden, Switzerland, United Kingdom	ydd
United Kingdom and Crown dependencies
Cornish	Critically endangered	557		cor
Guernésiais	Severely endangered	200	(Guernsey)	nrn
Irish	Definitely endangered	170,000-1,760,000	Also spoken in: Ireland	gle
Jèrriais	Severely endangered	4,700	(Jersey)	nrn
Manx	Critically endangered	2,023	(Isle of Man)	glv
Romani	Definitely endangered	3,500,000	Also spoken in: Albania, Austria, Belarus, Bosnia and Herzegovina, Bulgaria, Croatia, Czech Republic, Estonia, Finland, France, Germany, Greece, Hungary, Italy, Latvia, Lithuania, North Macedonia, Montenegro, Netherlands, Poland, Romania, Russia, Serbia, Slovakia, Slovenia, Switzerland, Turkey, Ukraine	rmc, rmf, rml, rmn, rmo, rmw, rmy
Scots	Vulnerable	99,200		sco
Scottish Gaelic	Definitely endangered	130,000	Also spoken in: Canada	gla
Sercquiais	Critically endangered	3		
Welsh	Vulnerable	892,200	Also spoken in: Patagonia	cym
Yiddish	Definitely endangered	1,510,000	Also spoken in: Austria, Belarus, Belgium, Czech Republic, Denmark, Estonia, Finland, France, Germany, Hungary, Italy, Latvia, Lithuania, Luxembourg, Moldova, Norway, Netherlands, Poland, Romania, Russia, Slovakia, Sweden, Switzerland, Ukraine	ydd

== See also ==
- Lists of endangered languages
- List of European languages
- List of extinct languages of Europe
- List of endangered languages in Russia
- List of endangered languages in Asia
