= Votic language =

Finnic language

Votic
- Vod
- vaďďa tšeeli, maatšeeli
- Pronunciation: [ˈvɑdʲːɑ ˈt͡ɕeːlʲi, ˈmɑːˌt͡ɕeːlʲi]
- Native to: Russia
- Region: Ingria
- Ethnicity: Vots
- Native speakers: 21 (2020); 100 with some knowledge (2021)
- Language family: Uralic: Finnic; Southern Finnic; Votic
- Dialects: Krevinian; Kukkuzi

Language codes
- ISO 639-2: vot
- ISO 639-3: vot
- Glottolog: voti1245
- ELP: Votic
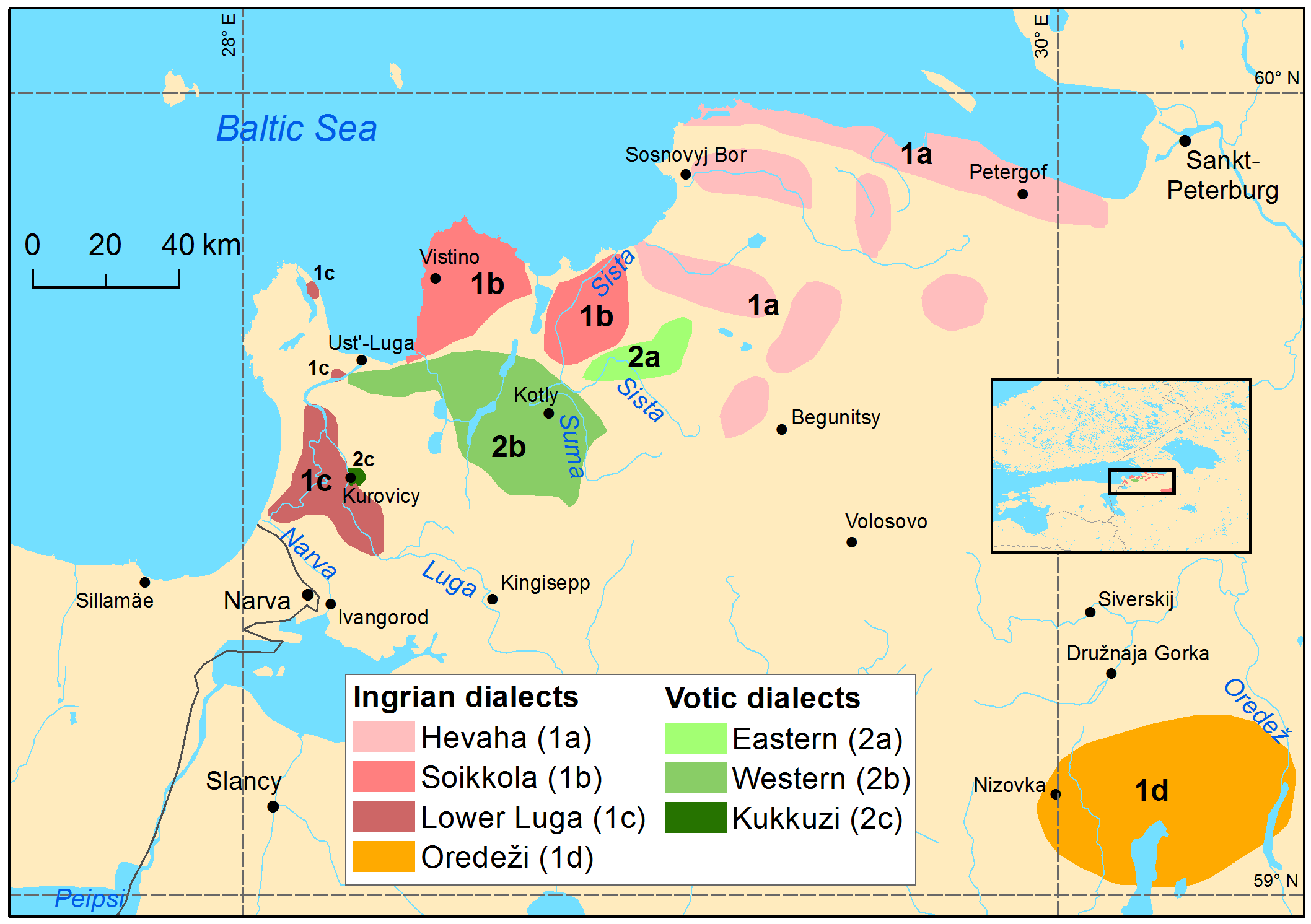
- Distribution of Ingrian and Votic at the beginning of the 20th century

- Votic is classified as Critically Endangered by the UNESCO Atlas of the World's Languages in Danger (2010).

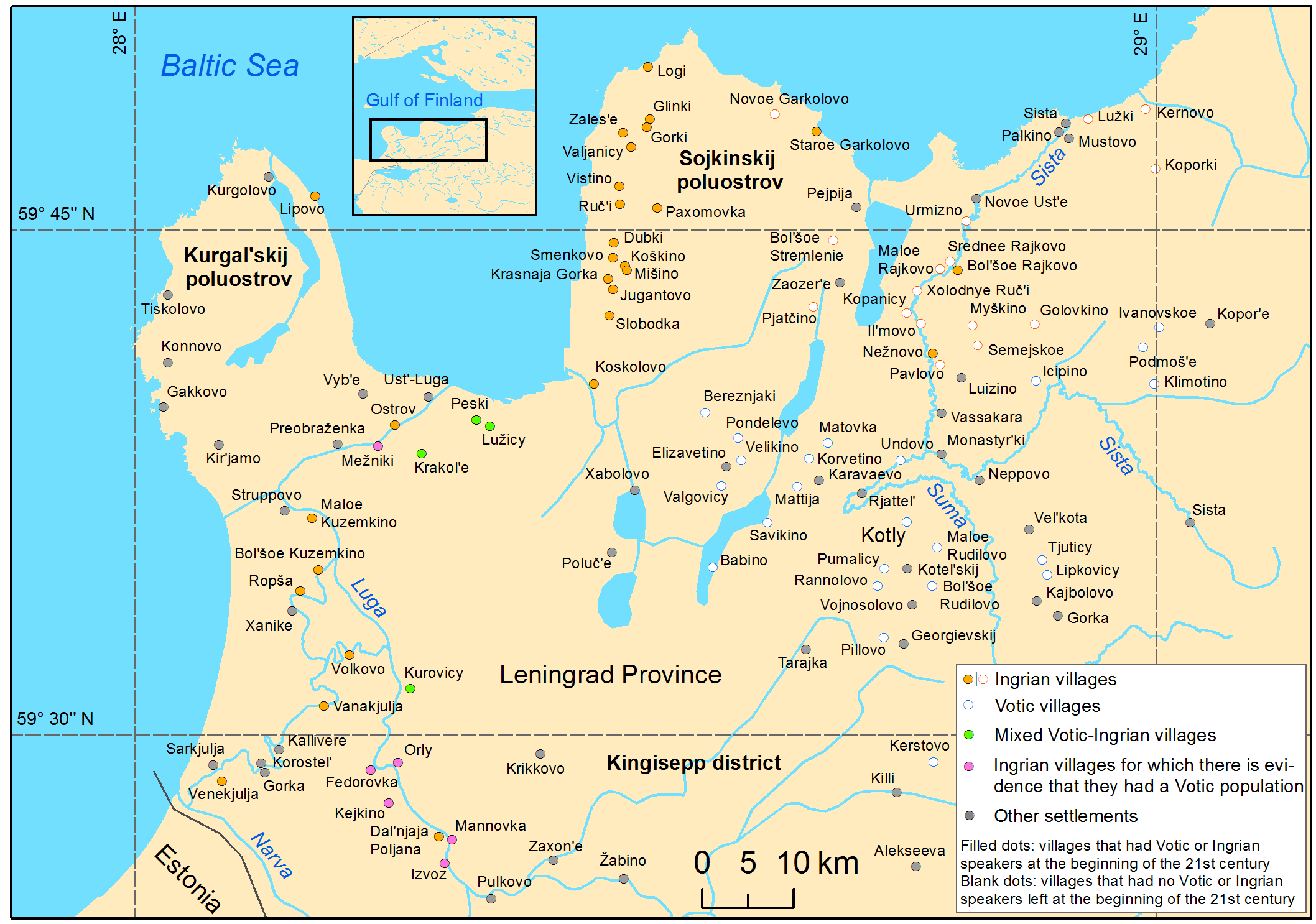
Ingrian and Votic villages at the beginning of the 21st century

Votic, Votian or Vote (vaďďa tšeeli, maatšeeli) [ˈvɑdʲːɑ ˈt͡ɕeːlʲi, ˈmɑːˌt͡ɕeːlʲi], is a Finnic language spoken by the Vots of Ingria, belonging to the Finnic branch of the Uralic languages. Votic is spoken only in Krakolye (now part of Ust-Luga) and Luzhitsy, two villages in Kingiseppsky District in Leningrad Oblast, Russia. In the 2020–2021 Russian census, 21 people claimed to speak Votic natively, which is an increase from 4 in 2010. Arvo Survo also estimated that around 100 people have knowledge of the language to some degree.

== History ==
Votic is one of numerous Finnic varieties known from Ingria. Votic shares some similarities with and has acquired loanwords from the adjacent Ingrian language, but also has deep-reaching similarities with Estonian to the west, which is considered its closest relative. Some linguists, including Tiit-Rein Viitso and Paul Alvre, have claimed that Votic evolved specifically from northeastern dialects of ancient Estonian. Votic regardless exhibits several features that indicate its distinction from Estonian (both innovations such as the palatalisation of velar consonants and a more developed system of cases, and retentions such as vowel harmony). According to Estonian linguist Paul Ariste, Votic was distinct from other Finnic languages, such as Finnish and Estonian, as early as the 6th century AD and has evolved independently ever since.

Isoglosses setting Votic apart from the other Finnic languages include:

- Loss of initial *h
- Palatalization of *k to /tʃ/ before front vowels. This was a relatively late innovation, not found in Kreevin Votic or Kukkuzi Votic.
- Lenition of the clusters *ps, *ks to /hs/
- Lenition of the cluster *st to geminate /sː/

Features shared with Estonian and the other southern Finnic languages include:

- Loss of word-final *n
- Shortening of vowels before *h
- Introduction of /ɤ/ from backing of *e before a back vowel
- Development of *o to /ɤ/ in certain words (particularly frequent in Votic)
- Loss of /h/ after a sonorant (clusters *lh *nh *rh)

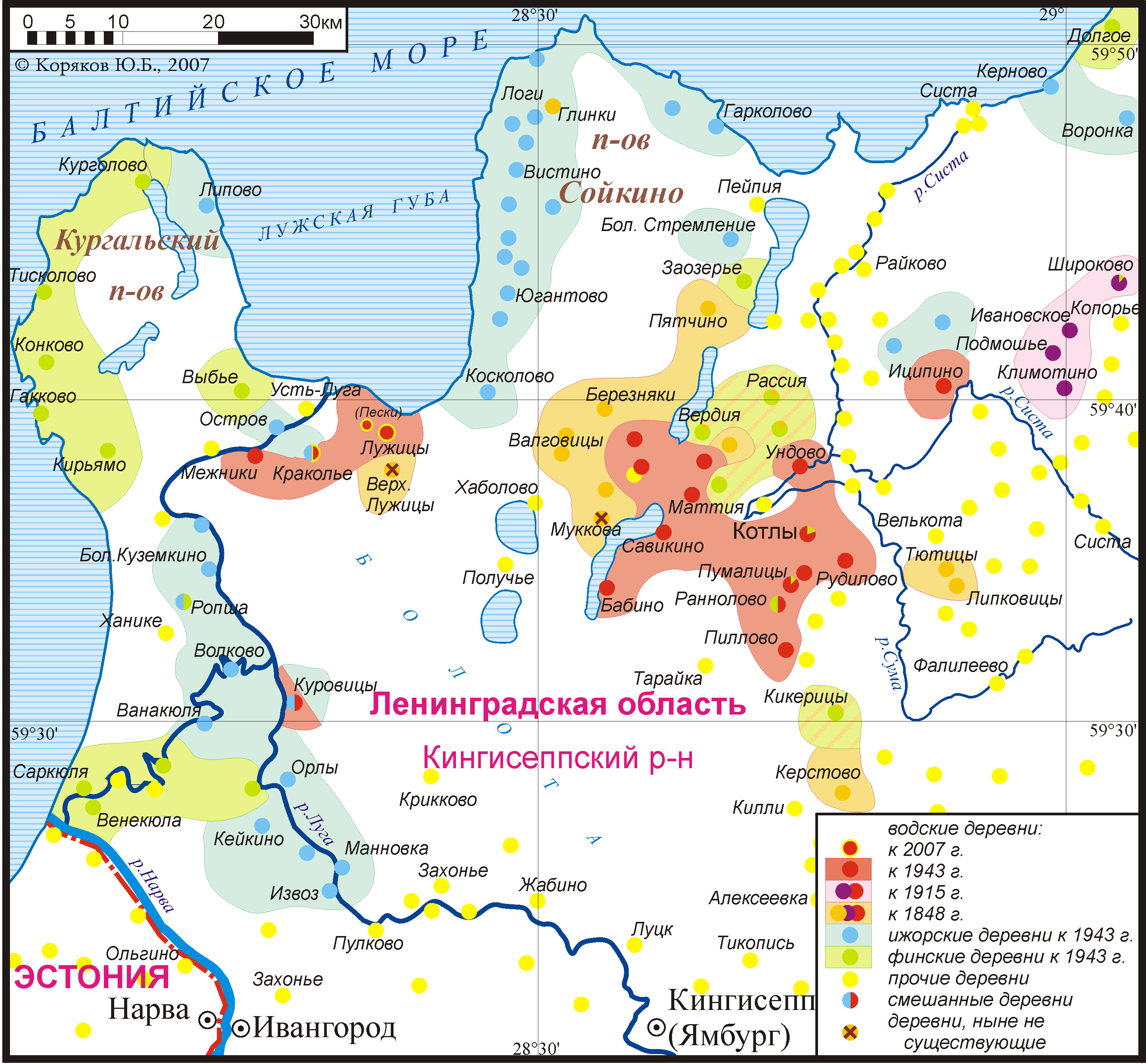
A map of Votic and neighbouring Ingrian-Finnish and Izhorian villages 1848–2007

In the 19th century, Votic was already declining in favour of Russian (there were around 1,000 speakers of the language by the start of World War I). After the Bolshevik Revolution, under Lenin, Votic had a brief revival period, with the language being taught at local schools and the first-ever grammar of Votic (Jõgõperä/Krakolye dialect) being published. But after Joseph Stalin came into power, the language began to decline. World War II had a devastating effect on the Votic language, with the number of speakers considerably decreased as a result of military offensives, deliberate destruction of villages by Nazi troops, forced migration to the Klooga concentration camp in Estonia and to Finland under the Nazi government, and the Stalinist policy of "dispersion" immediately after the war against the families whose members had been sent to Finland under the Nazi government. Since then, the Vots have largely concealed their Votic identity, pretending to be Russians in the predominantly Russian environment. But they continued to use the language at home and when talking to family members and relatives. After the death of Stalin, the Vots were no longer mistreated and many of those who had been sent away returned to their villages. But the language had considerably declined and the number of bilingual speakers increased. Because Votic was stigmatised as a language of "uneducated villagers", Votic speakers avoided using it in public and Votic children were discouraged from using it even at home because, in the opinion of some local school teachers, it prevented them from learning to speak and write in Russian properly. Thus, in the second half of the 20th century there emerged a generation of young ethnic Vots whose first language was Russian and who understood Votic but were unable to speak it.

== Education ==
There have been multiple attempts in Votic language education. In 1995–1998, Votic language courses were held in St. Petersburg, which were organized by Mehmet Muslimov. These courses were attended by about 30 people. In 2003–2004, courses were held again, and these were also organized by Muslimov. Muslimov has also made Votic self-study material available on the internet. During 2010–2015, there were Votic courses established, which were attended by around 10 people. There are also Votic events where studying material for Votic is given to people. In 2015, a Votic study book called Vad'd'a sõnakopittõja was published by Heinike Heinsoo and Nikita Djačkov. There have also been a few lessons organized by T.F. Prokopenko for little children in a school in a Votic village.

== Dialects ==
Three definite dialect groups of Votic are known:

- Votic
  - Western, the areas around the mouth of the Luga River
  - Eastern, in villages around Koporye
  - Krevinian, areas around the city of Bauska, Latvia

The Western dialect area can be further divided into the Central dialects (spoken around the village of Kattila) and the Lower Luga dialects.

Of these, only the Lower Luga dialect is still spoken.

In 1848 it was estimated that of a total of 5,298 speakers of Votic, 3,453 (65%) spoke the western dialect, 1,695 (35%) spoke the eastern and 150 (3%) spoke the dialect of Kukkuzi. Kreevin had 12–15 speakers in 1810, the last records of Kreevin speakers are from 1846. The Kreevin dialect was spoken in an enclave in Latvia by descendants of Votic prisoners of war who were brought to the Bauska area of Latvia in the 15th century by the Teutonic order. The last known speaker of the eastern dialect died in 1960, in the village of Icäpäivä (Itsipino). A fourth dialect of Votic has often been claimed as well: the traditional language variety of the village of Kukkuzi. It shows a mix of features of Votic and neighboring Ingrian, and some linguists, e.g. Arvo Laanest have claimed that it is actually rather a dialect of Ingrian. The vocabulary and phonology of the dialect are largely Ingrian-based, but it shares some grammatical features with the main Votic dialects, probably representing a former Votic substratum. In particular, all phonological features that Votic shares specifically with Estonian (e.g. the presence of the vowel õ) are absent from the dialect. The Kukkuzi dialect has been declared to be dead since the 1970s, although three speakers have still been located in 2006.

== Phonology ==
=== Vowels ===
Votic has 10 vowel qualities, all of which can be long or short; represented in the following chart. The vowels /ɨ/ and /ɨː/ are found only in loanwords. The Votic ⟨õ⟩ /ɤ/, however, is impressionistically a bit higher than the Estonian ⟨õ⟩, with the rest of the vowel inventory generally corresponding to the ones found in Estonian.

(IPA) (FUT)	Front		Central	Back
(IPA) (FUT)	unrounded	rounded	Central	Back
Close	/i/ /iː/	/y/ /yː/	/ɨ/ /ɨː/	/u/ /uː/
Mid	/e/ /eː/	/ø/ /øː/	/ɤ/ /ɤː/	/o/ /oː/
Open	/æ/ /æː/			/ɑ/ /ɑː/

In some central dialects, the long mid vowels /eː oː øː/ have been diphthongized to /ie uo yø/, as in Finnish. Thus, tee 'road' is pronounced as tie. Votic also has a large inventory of diphthongs. Some diphthongs in Votic fail to conform to the vowel harmony pattern.

Diphthongs
	ɑ	u	y	æ	i
ɑ		ɑu̯			ɑi
o		ou̯			oi
u	uɑ̯				ui
ɤ	ɤɑ̯	ɤu̯			ɤi
ø		øu̯	øy		øi
y				yæ̯	yi
æ			æy		æi
e		eu̯	ey		ei
i	iɑ̯	iu̯	iy	iæ̯	

A diagram featuring vowel harmony in Votic

==== Vowel harmony ====
Votic has a system of vowel harmony, in which vowels sounds pattern according to their position in the oral cavity. Underived words tend to contain either front-harmonic or back-harmonic vowels, including suffixes. Front-harmonic vowels are /æ e ø y/ ⟨ä e ö ü⟩; the corresponding back-harmonic vowels are /ɑ ɤ o u/ ⟨a õ o u⟩. Unlike Finnish, Votic only has a single neutral vowel /i/.

However, there are exceptions in the behavior of /o ø/ ⟨o ö⟩. Some suffixes including the vowel /o/ do not harmonize (the occurrence of /ø/ ⟨ö⟩ in non-initial syllables is generally a result of Finnish or Ingrian loan words), and similarly onomatopoetic words and loanwords are may follow outside patterns of vowel harmony.

=== Consonants ===
		Labial	Dental		Post- alveolar	Palatal	Velar	Glottal
		Labial	plain	pal.	Post- alveolar	Palatal	Velar	Glottal
Nasal		m	n	nʲ			ŋ	
Plosive	voiceless	p	t	tʲ			k	
Plosive	voiced	b	d	dʲ			ɡ	
Affricate	voiceless		ts	(tsʲ)	tʃ			
Affricate	voiced				(dʒ)			
Fricative	voiceless	f	s	sʲ	ʃ		(x)	h
Fricative	voiced	v	z	zʲ	ʒ	ʝ		
Trill			r	rʲ				
Lateral approximant			l	lʲ		(ʎ)		

Notes:

- /dʒ/ occurs only in eastern Votic, as a weak-grade counterpart to /tʃ/.
- Palatalised consonants are rare and normally allophonic, occurring automatically before /i/ or before a consonant that in turn is followed by /i/. Phonemic palatalised consonants occur mostly as the result of a former following /j/, usually as geminates. In other environments they are almost entirely found in loanwords, primarily from Russian. In some words in certain dialects, a palatalised consonant may become phonemic by the loss of the following vowel, such as esimein > eśmein.
- /tʲ/ is affricated to [tsʲ] in Kukkuzi Votic.
- /ʎ/ only occurs in complementary distribution with /l/.
- /x/ mainly as a result of loanwords from Russian, Ingrian, and Finnish dialects, or as an allophone of /h/.

Nearly all Votic consonants may occur as geminates. Also, Votic also has a system of consonant gradation, which is discussed in further detail in the consonant gradation article, although a large amount of alternations involve voicing alternations. Two important differences in Votic phonetics as compared to Estonian and Finnish is that the sounds /ʝ/ and /v/ are actually fully fricatives, unlike Estonian and Finnish, in which they are approximants. Also, one possible allophone of /h/ is [ɸ], ühsi is thus pronounced as IPA: [yɸsi].

The lateral /l/ has a velarized allophone [ɫ] when occurring adjacent to back vowels.

Voicing is not contrastive word-finally. Instead a type of sandhi occurs: voiceless [p t k s] are realized before words beginning with a voiceless consonant, voiced [b d ɡ z] before voiced consonants (or vowels). Before a pause, the realization is voiceless lenis, [b̥ d̥ ɡ̊ z̥]; the stops are here similar to the Estonian b d g. Thus:

- pre-pausal: [vɑrɡɑz̥] "thief"
- before a voiceless consonant: [vɑrɡɑs‿t̪uɤb̥] "a thief comes"
- before a voiced consonant: [vɑrɡɑz‿vɤt̪ɑb̥] "a thief takes"

== Orthography ==
In the 1920s, the Votic linguist Dmitri Tsvetkov wrote a Votic grammar using a modified Cyrillic alphabet. The current Votic alphabet was created by Mehmet Muslimov in 2004:

A а	Ä ä	B b	C c	D d	D' d'	E e	F f	G g
H h	I i	J j	K k	L l	L' l'	M m	N n	N' n'
O o	Ö ö	Õ õ	P p	R r	R' r'	S s	S' s'	Š š
Z z	Z' z'	Ž ž	T t	T' t'	U u	V v	Ü ü	Ts ts

A peculiarity of Muslimov's orthography is using c for /t͡ʃ/ (this phoneme comes mostly from palatalization of historical /k/, compare Votic ceeli 'language', cülä 'village' with Finnish kieli, kylä). Some publications use tš or č instead.

One may find different orthographies for Votic in descriptive work. Some use a modified Cyrillic alphabet, and others a Latin one. The transcriptions based on Latin have many similarities with those used in closely related Finnic languages, such as the use of č for /t͡ʃ/. At least a couple of ways exist for indicating long vowels in Votic; placing a macron over the vowel (such as ā) as in Latvian, or as in written Estonian and Finnish, doubling the vowel (aa). Geminate consonants are generally represented with two characters. The representation of central vowels varies. In some cases the practice is to use e̮ according to the standards of Uralic transcription, while in other cases the letter õ is used, as in Estonian.

== Grammar ==
Votic is an agglutinating language much like the other Finnic languages.
