= Krevinian dialect =

Extinct dialect of Votic

Krevinian
- Krevin
- Native to: Latvia
- Region: Bauska
- Ethnicity: Kreevins
- Extinct: mid-19th century
- Language family: Uralic: Finnic; Southern Finnic; Votic; Krevinian

Language codes
- ISO 639-3: zkv
- Glottolog: krev1234

Krevinian, or Krevin (Latvian: krieviņu dialekts) was a dialect of the Votic language, spoken in Latvia until the mid-19th century. It was spoken in the city of Bauska, in Courland.

The Krevinian dialect left loanwords into the Bauska dialects, such as kurika 'cudgel'.

== Sample ==
Meģģi ise taiwâs!
jadku elka śiwu śenna
tulap meģģi tiwi śivu riikki!
Śiwu meelle se iggau ka kui taiwâs ni kans ma bēli!
Meģģi arma leipe anna meli tennawa.
Ġedde meggi padudd, kui me jattim umili nisi meli jad!
Elas meite kurja sad.
Śewon wodse kurģe miusse erre
Jo siula kalpap śiwu kikki śiwu appi un śiwu üwiwi śewonśe śewonśe.
Amen

— The Lord's prayer in Krevinian,
