= Mehmet Muslimov =

Russian linguist

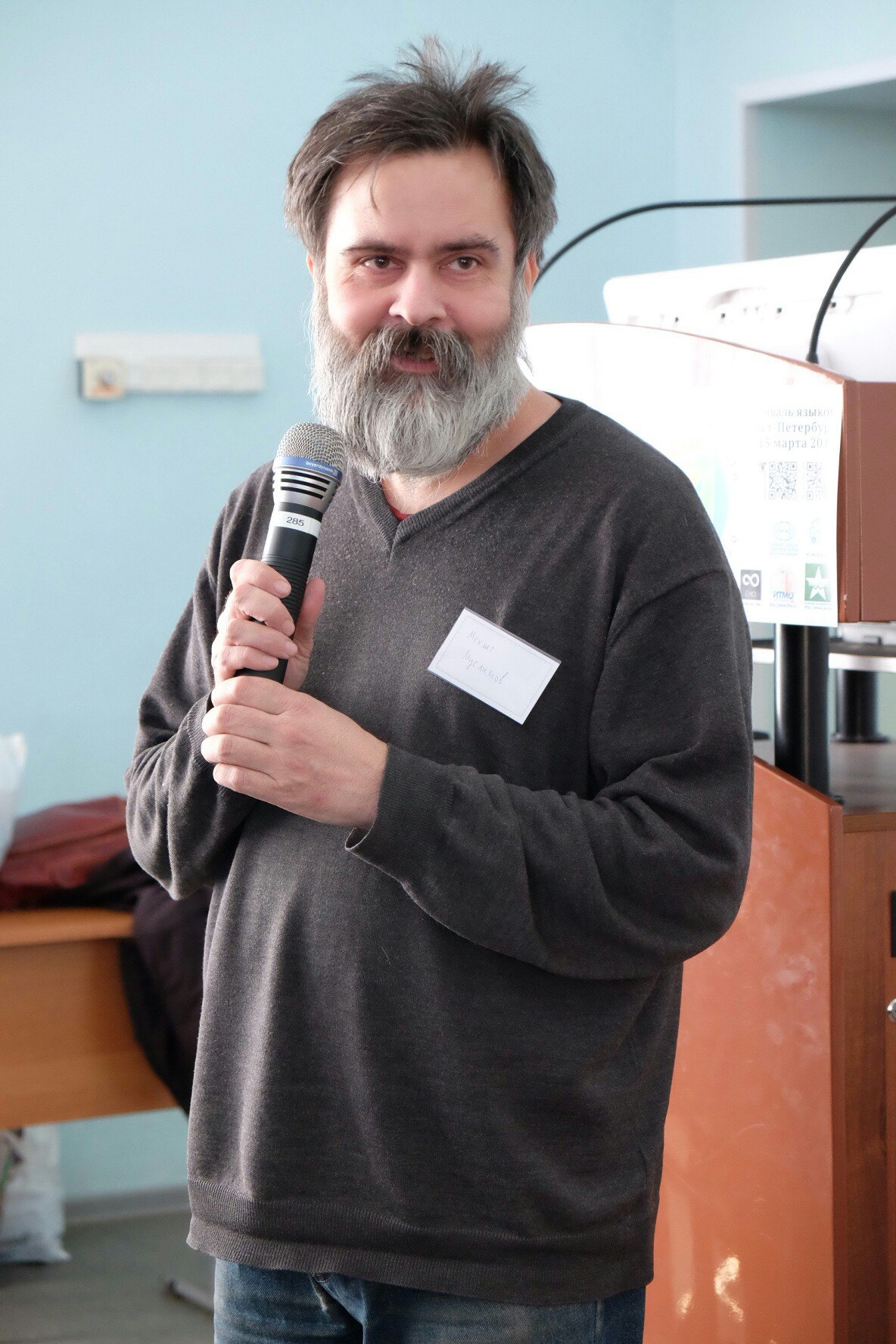
- Born: August 14, 1964 (age 62); Leningrad, Russian SFSR, Soviet Union
- Occupation: Linguistics
- Employer: Institute for Linguistic Studies

Mehmet Muslimov (Russian: Мехмед Закирович Муслимов, born August 14, 1964) is a Russian linguist, and an expert in Finno-Ugric languages. He is a member of Strana Yazykov, a nationwide network of language activists.

== Biography ==
Mehmet Muslimov was born in Saint Petersburg. He received a Master of Arts in ethnology from the European University at Saint Petersburg and a Candidate of Sciences degree from the Institute for Linguistic Studies of the Russian Academy of Sciences, where he has been working ever since. His thesis was dedicated to language contact in Western Ingria and written under the academic supervision of Evgeny Golovko. Muslimov teaches the endangered Votic and Ingrian languages at a local cultural centre in Saint Petersburg.

== Selected publications ==
- Muslimov, Mehmet. 2009. K klassifikacii finskih dialektov Ingermanlandii. In Voprosy uralistiki: 179–204. Saint Petersburg: Nauka.
- Muslimov, Mehmet. 2012. "Narodnaya dialektologija" v nižnelužskom areale. Acta Linguistica Petropolitana 8(1): 135–193.
