= Deeside Gaelic =

Dialect of Scottish Gaelic

- Aberdeenshire Gaelic
- Scottish Gaelic: Gàidhlig Shrath Deathain
- Region: Aberdeenshire
- Extinct: 18 March 1984, with the death of Jean Bain
- Language family: Indo-European: Celtic; Insular Celtic; Goidelic; Scottish Gaelic; Deeside Gaelic
- Early forms: Proto-Indo-European: Proto-Celtic; Proto-Goidelic; Primitive Irish

Language codes
- ISO 639-1: gd
- ISO 639-2: gla
- ISO 639-3: gla
- Glottolog: scot1245
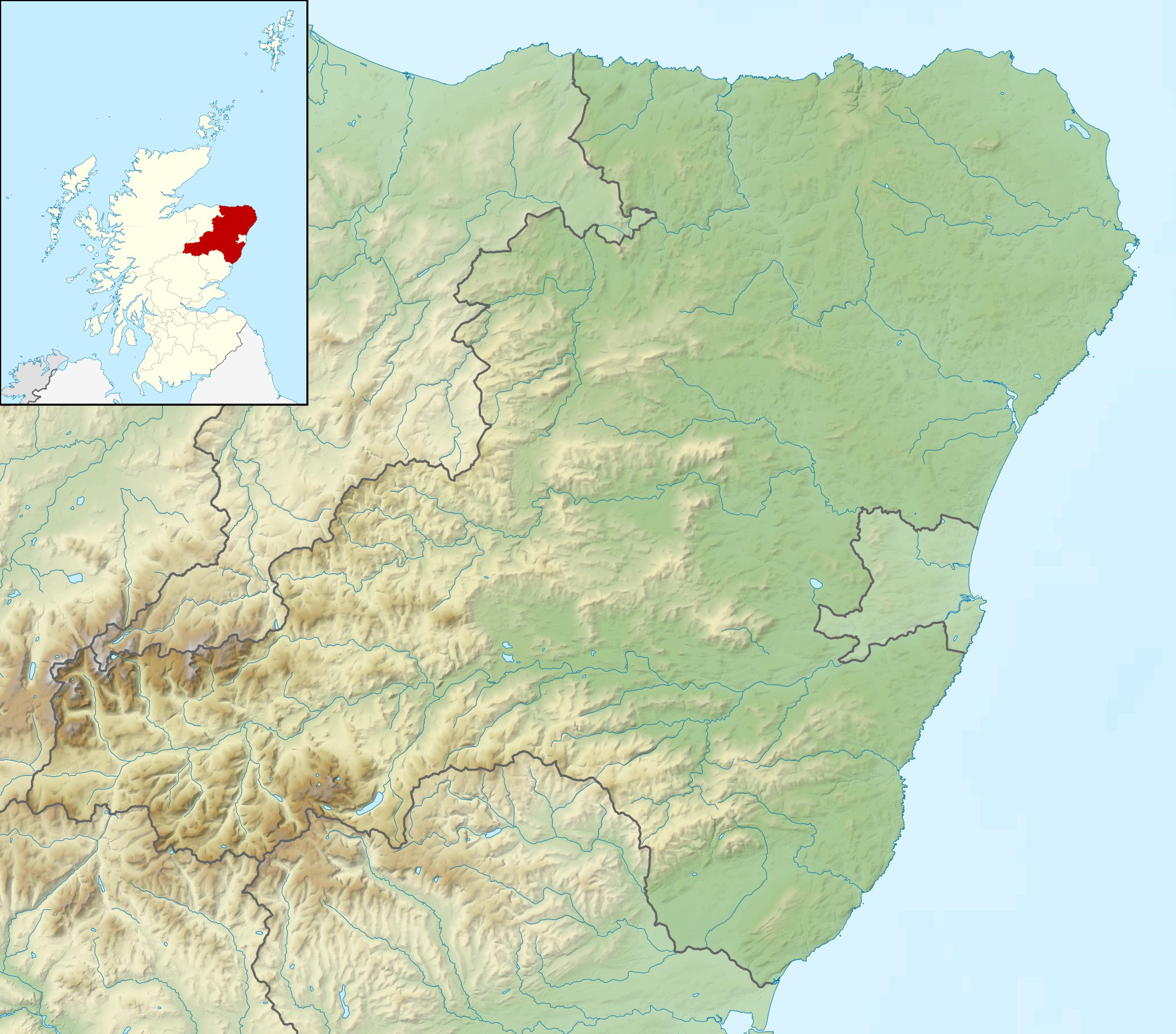

Deeside Gaelic is an extinct dialect of Scottish Gaelic spoken in Aberdeenshire until 1984. Unlike a lot of extinct dialects of Scottish Gaelic, it is relatively well attested. A lot of the work pertaining to Deeside Gaelic was done by Frances Carney Diack, and was expanded upon by David Clement, Adam Watson and Seumas Grannd.

== Decline ==
In Aberdeenshire, 18% of Crathie and Braemar and as much as 61% in Inverey were bilingual in 1891. By 1984, the dialect had died out.

== Features in Deeside Gaelic ==
In the mid-20th Century the Scottish Gaelic Dialect Survey was undertaken when there were still people who spoke Deeside Gaelic. Features of Deeside Gaelic include:

- dropping of unstressed syllables; an example of this is the Word "Duine" becoming "duin'"
- weakening of the /o/ to a /u/ sound, words such as "Dol" being pronounced closer to "Dul"
- slender nn being pronounced like an English ng
- mutation of f instead of being dropped is pronounced as a /v/ or /b/ or /p/ in Speyside
- dropping of -adh, words such as tuilleadh being recorded as tull
- conditional final stop; conditional tense was realised as a /g/ or /k/ sound in Braemar
- shortening of words; words such as agaibh being pronounced closer to "aki" and cinnteach being shortened to cinnt
