= Nikolskoye, Tosnensky District, Leningrad Oblast =

Town in Leningrad Oblast, Russia

Nikolskoye Никольское
- Town
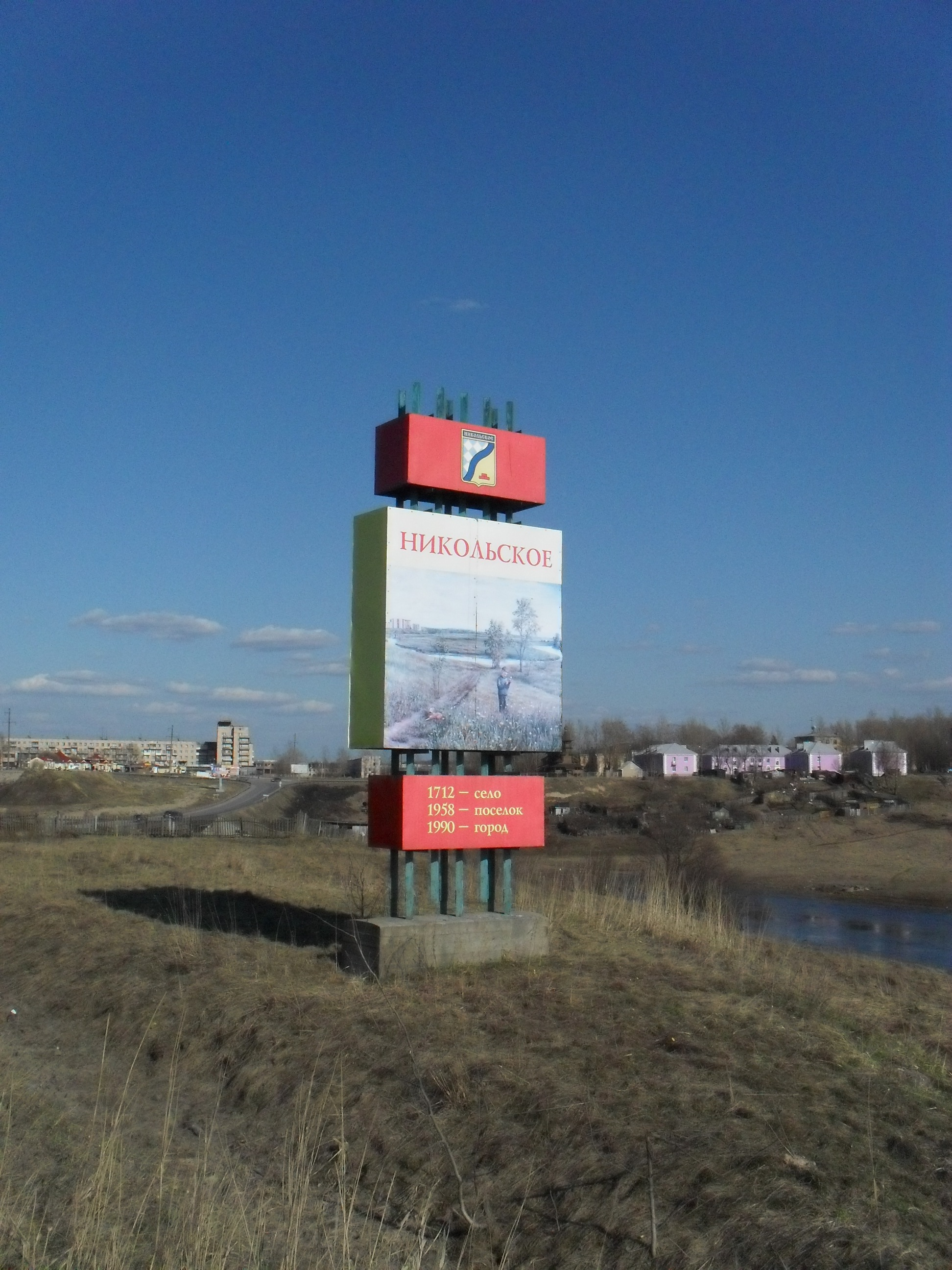
- Welcome sign at the western entry to Nikolskoye
- Interactive map of Nikolskoye
- Location of Nikolskoye Nikolskoye (Leningrad Oblast)
- Coordinates: 59°42′N 30°47′E
- Country: Russia
- Federal subject: Leningrad Oblast
- Administrative district: Tosnensky District
- Settlement municipal formationSelsoviet: Nikolskoye Settlement Municipal Formation
- Established: 1710
- Town status since: August 6, 1990

Population (2010 Census)
  - Total: 19,280
  - Estimate (2024): 21,382 (+10.9%)

Administrative status
  - Capital of: Nikolskoye Settlement Municipal Formation

Municipal status
  - Municipal district: Tosnensky Municipal District
  - Urban settlement: Nikolskoye Urban Settlement
  - Capital of: Nikolskoye Urban Settlement
- Time zone: UTC+3 (MSK)
- Postal code: 187026
- OKTMO ID: 41648108001
- Website: www.nikolskoecity.ru

Nikolskoye (Russian: Нико́льское, Finnish: Lomkka) is a town in Tosnensky District of Leningrad Oblast, Russia, located on the Tosna River 40 kilometers (25 mi) southeast of the center of St. Petersburg. Population: 19,280 (2010 census); 17,309 (2002 census); 17,215 (1989 Soviet census).

== History ==
It was founded in 1710, when Peter the Great resettled several masons from Central Russia to serve the newly founded St. Petersburg and its surroundings. There were quarries around Nikolskoye, and the settlement supplied stone, brick, and timber to St. Petersburg. The name was given because the settlers brought an icon of Saint Nicholas and built a church to host the icon.

During the administrative reform carried out in 1708 by Peter the Great, the area was included in the Ingermanland Governorate (known since 1710 as the St. Petersburg Governorate). In 1727, it became a part of Sankt-Peterburgsky Uyezd.

In 1876, Colonel Boris Vinner bought a piece of land from the peasants of the selo of Nikolskoye. In 1877, he opened a privately owned gunpowder works, called Yekaterininsky Zavod. Around the same time, a glass factory was opened. It belonged to merchant Maximilian Frank and was eventually destroyed during World War II. Quarries around Nikolskoye stopped operating in the 1920s.

Sankt-Peterburgsky Uyezd was renamed Petrogradsky in 1914 and Leningradsky in January 1924. On August 1, 1927, the uyezds were abolished, and Kolpinsky District, with the administrative center in the town of Kolpino, was established. The governorates were also abolished, and the district became a part of the Leningrad Okrug of Leningrad Oblast. Nikolskoye became a part of the Kolpinsky District. On August 15, 1930, the okrugs were also abolished, and the districts were directly subordinated to the oblast. On August 19, 1930, the district was abolished. Nikolskoye became a part of the newly established Tosnensky District.

Between September 1941 and January 1944, during World War II, the Tosnensky District was occupied by German troops. Nikolskoye was lying at the front line during the Siege of Leningrad and was greatly damaged.

Nikolskoye was granted urban-type settlement status on June 9, 1958 and town status on August 6, 1990.

== Administrative and municipal status ==
Within the framework of administrative divisions, it is, together with three rural localities, incorporated within Tosnensky District as Nikolskoye Settlement Municipal Formation. As a municipal division, Nikolskoye Settlement Municipal Formation is incorporated within Tosnensky Municipal District as Nikolskoye Urban Settlement.

== Economy ==
=== Industry ===
In Nikolskoye, there are several factories producing construction materials.

=== Transportation ===
The railway in Nikolskoye is not used for passenger traffic. The closest railway stations are Ivanovskaya on the line connecting St. Petersburg and Mga, Popovka and Sablino on the line connecting St. Petersburg and Moscow, and Pustynka on the line connecting Mga and Gatchina. All these stations are served by suburban trains.

Roads connect Nikolskoye with Otradnoye, Ulyanovka, and Krasny Bor. Via Ulyanovka, it has access to the M10 Highway, which connects St. Petersburg and Moscow.

== Culture and recreation ==
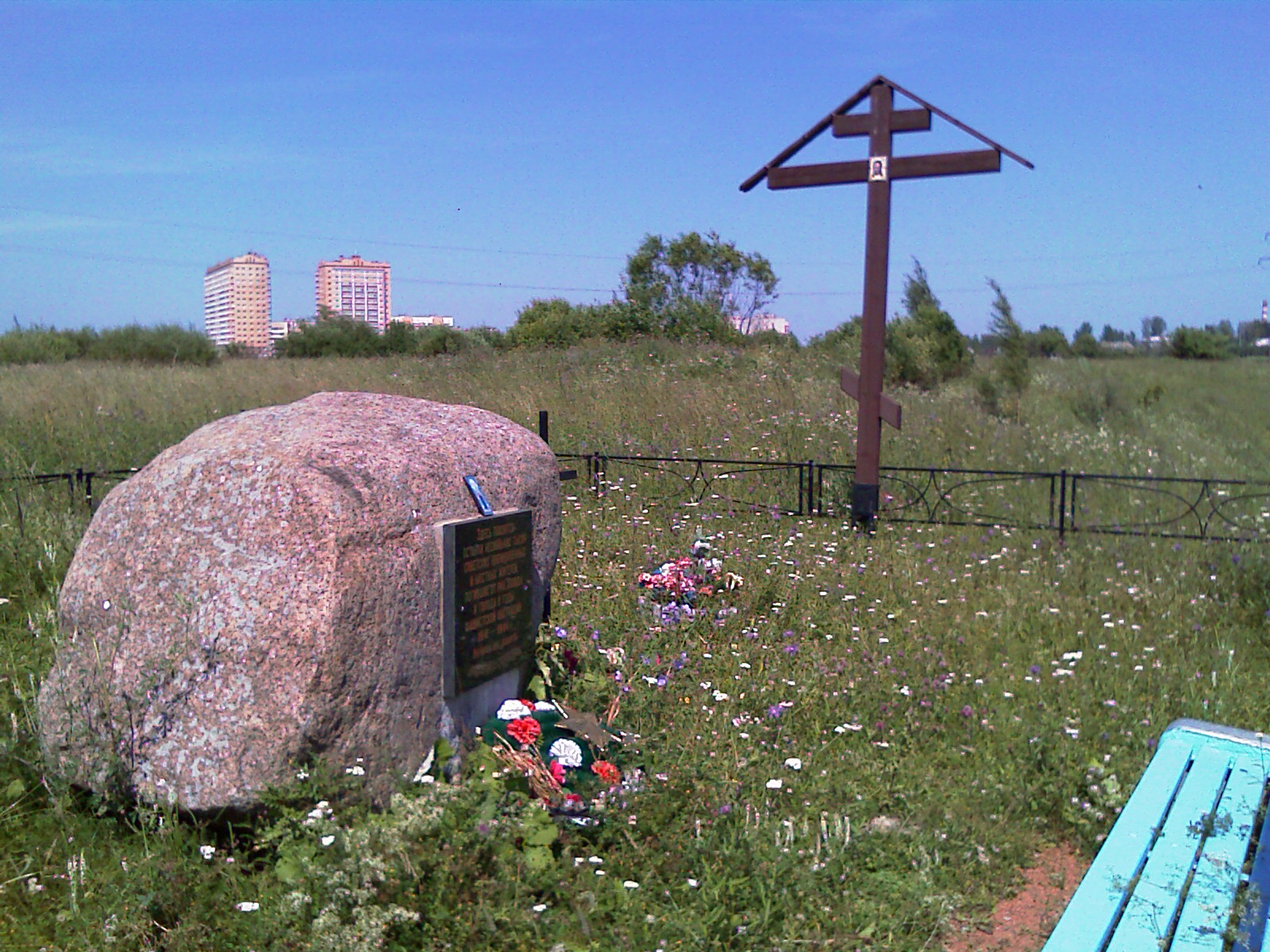
Nikolskoye World War II memorial (see the zoomed plaque here)

The town contains two objects classified as cultural and historical heritage of local significance. They commemorate events of World War II.

There are two churches: the original town-founding church dedicated to Saint Nicholas and a modern wooden church dedicated to Saint Tsar Nicholas II.
