= Ryabovo, Tosnensky District, Leningrad Oblast =

Ryabovo Рябово
- Urban-type settlement
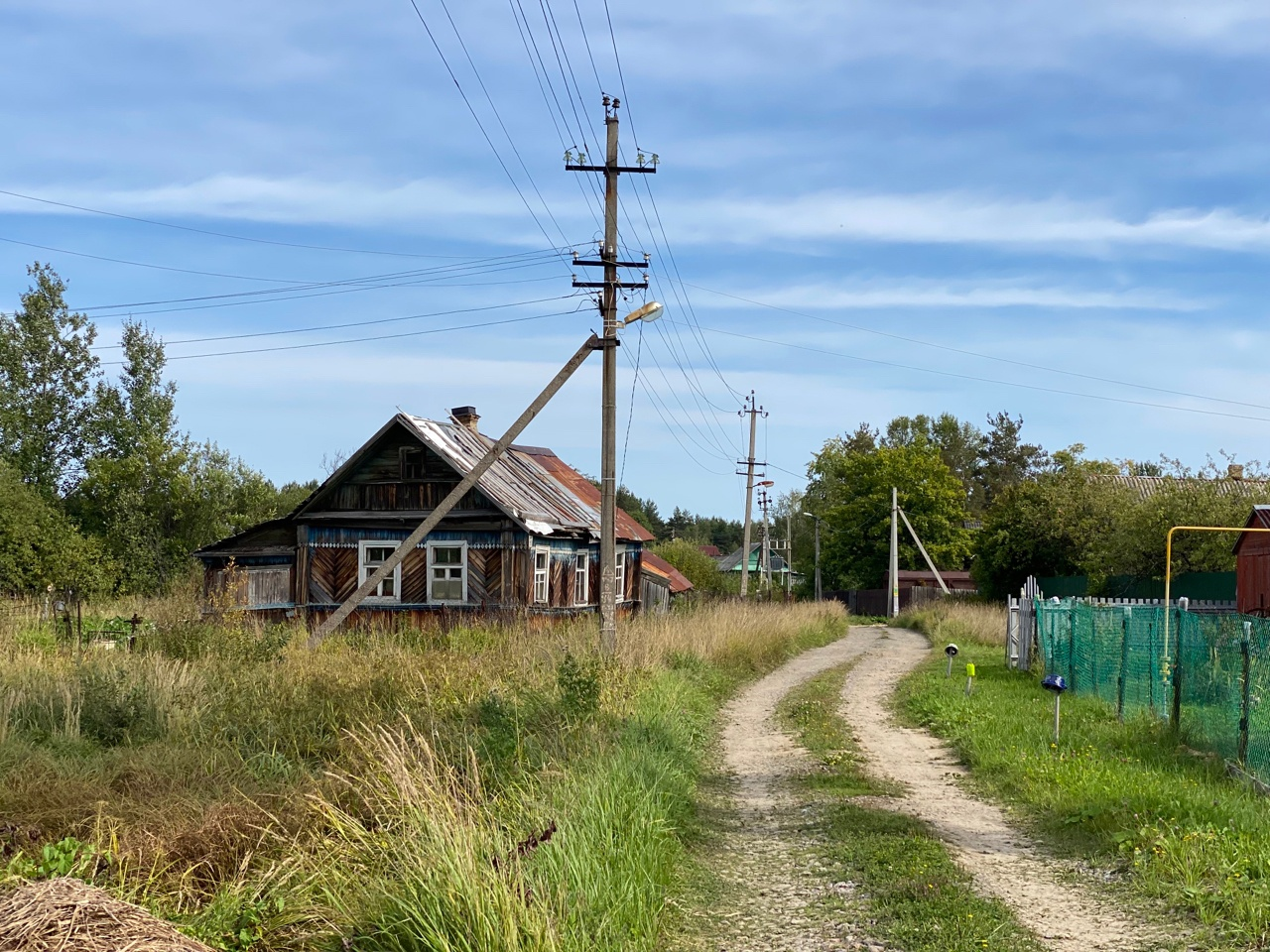
- Interactive map of Ryabovo
- Location of Ryabovo Ryabovo (Leningrad Oblast)
- Coordinates: 59°24′N 31°08′E
- Country: Russia
- Federal subject: Leningrad Oblast
- Administrative district: Tosnensky District
- Urban-type settlement status since: 3 November 1965

Population (2010 Census)
  - Total: 3,251
  - Estimate (2024): 2,992 (−8%)

Municipal status
  - Municipal district: Tosnensky Municipal District
  - Urban settlement: Ryabovskoye Urban Settlement
  - Capital of: Ryabovskoye Urban Settlement
- Time zone: UTC+3 (MSK)
- Postal code: 187041
- OKTMO ID: 41648160051
- Website: ryabovo-adm.ru

Ryabovo (Russian: Ря́бово) is an urban locality (an urban-type settlement) in Tosnensky District of Leningrad Oblast, Russia, located southeast of Saint Petersburg, between the towns of Tosno and Lyuban. Municipally it is incorporated as Ryabovskoye Urban Settlement, one of the seven urban settlements in the district. Population: 3,251 (2010 census); 3,309 (2002 census); 3,935 (1989 Soviet census).

== History ==
In 1907, Esmeralda Mende (Russian: Эсмеральда Яковлевна Менде), a British citizen, bought a piece of land in Ryabovo and built a brick factory, which started operation in 1910. Prior to these events, Ryabovo was a summer house area. It was a part of Lyubanskaya Volost of Novgorodsky Uyezd of Novgorod Governorate.

On 1 August 1927 the uyezds were abolished and Lyubansky District, with the administrative center in the town of Lyuban, was established. Ryabovo became a part of Lyubansky District. The governorates were also abolished, and the district was a part of Leningrad Okrug of Leningrad Oblast. On 23 July 1930 the okrugs were abolished as well, and the districts were directly subordinated to the oblast. On 19 August 1930 Lyubansky District was abolished and Ryabovo became a part of newly established Tosnensky District with the administrative district in the town of Tosno. Between September 1941 and January 1944, during World War II, it was occupied by German troops. On 3 November 1965 Ryabovo was granted urban-type settlement status.

== Economy ==
=== Industry ===
The ceramic plant, founded in 1907, stopped production in 1993, but resumed it in 2011. The main product is brick.
The Peat Company «Pelgorskoe-M». The main product is peat.

=== Transportation ===
The Moscow – Saint Petersburg Railway and the M10 highway, connecting Moscow and Saint Petersburg, run through the Ryabovo.
The Pelgorskoye peat narrow gauge railway serves a peat factory which became operational in 2004.

== Culture and recreation ==
A mass grave of civilians executed by Nazi officials for connections with Soviet partisans during World War II is protected as a historical monument of local significance.
