= Tosnensky =

Tosnensky (masculine), Tosnenskaya (feminine), or Tosnenskoye (neuter) may refer to:

- Tosnensky District, a district of Leningrad Oblast, Russia
- Tosnenskoye Urban Settlement, a municipal formation corresponding to Tosnenskoye Settlement Municipal Formation, an administrative division of Tosnensky District of Leningrad Oblast, Russia
