= Tosna =

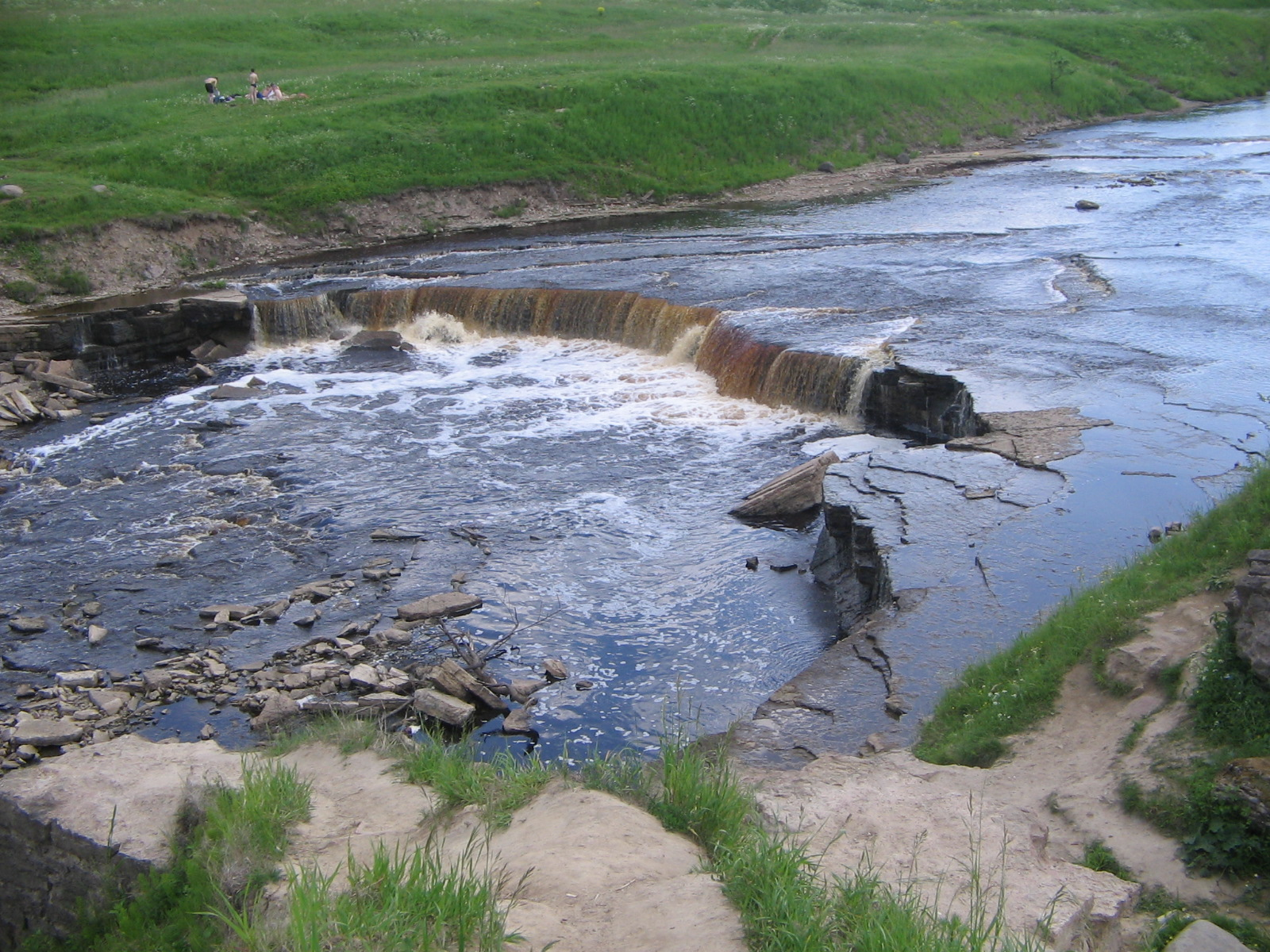
- Tosna rapids

Location
- Country: Russia

Physical characteristics
- Source
  - location: near Poddubye village
  - elevation: 60 m (200 ft)
- Mouth: Neva
  - coordinates: 59°45′43″N 30°45′29″E
- Length: 121 km (75 mi)
- Basin size: 1,640 km^{2} (630 sq mi)

Basin features
- Progression: Neva→ Gulf of Finland

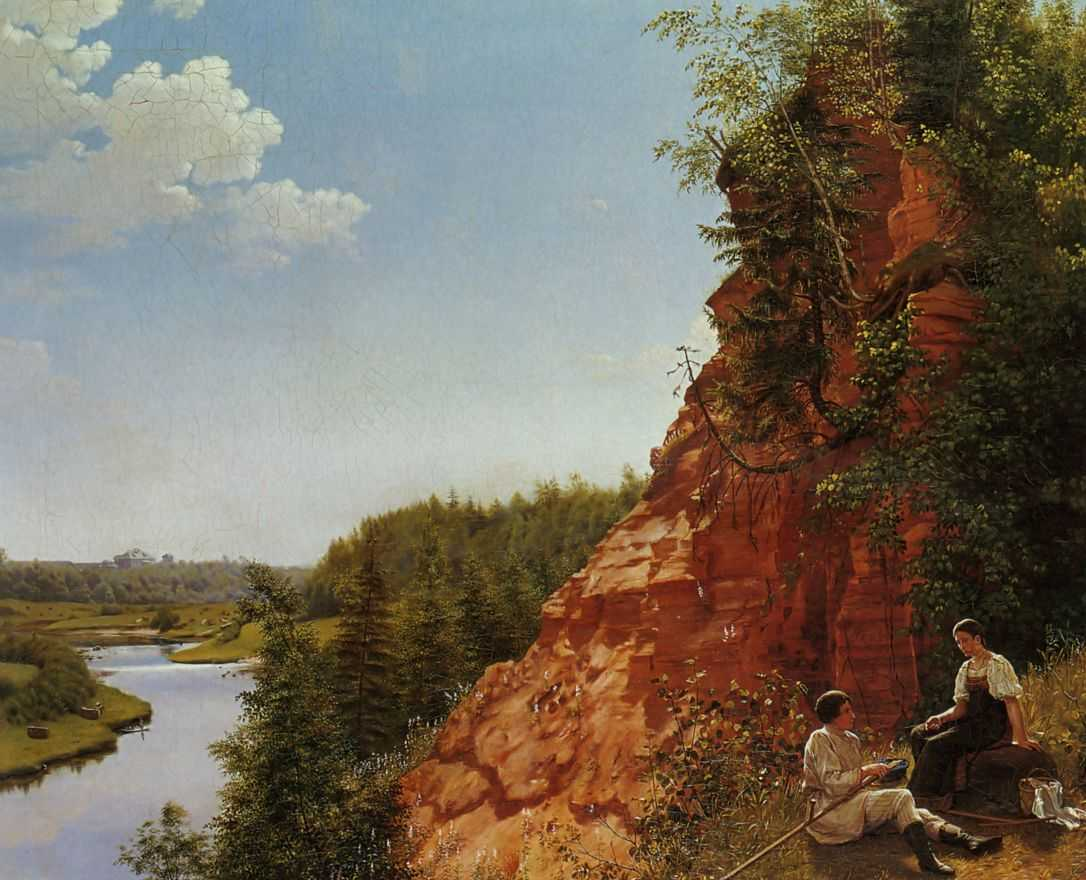
View of the Tosna River (1827) by Alexey Tyranov

The Tosna (Russian: То́сна) is a northward river in Luzhsky, Tosnensky, and Kirovsky Districts of Leningrad Oblast, Russia, as well as in the city of Saint Petersburg. It is a left tributary of the Neva. The towns of Tosno, Nikolskoye, and Otradnoye, as well as the urban-type settlement of Ulyanovka are along it. Its length is 121 kilometres (75 mi). Its drainage basin covers 1,640 square kilometres (630 mi^{2}) which mainly has northward flowing streams. Its main tributary is the Yeglinka which is on the left bank.

The source is in swamps south of the settlement of Radofinnikovo. The river flows north, enters Tosnensky District, passes the town of Tosno, and essentially enters the suburbs of Saint Petersburg. There, it flows through Ulyanovka and Nikolskoye. In this area, limestone rocks occasionally form the banks. In particular, Sablinskiye Caves, disused quarries, are by the river. A stretch of Tosna between Nikolskoye and Otradnoye serves as a border between the city of Saint Petersburg (west) and Leningrad Oblast (east). The mouth/confluence abuts the west of Otradnoye, a town.
