= Pella railway station =

Railway station in Leningrad Oblast, Russia

Pella Пелла
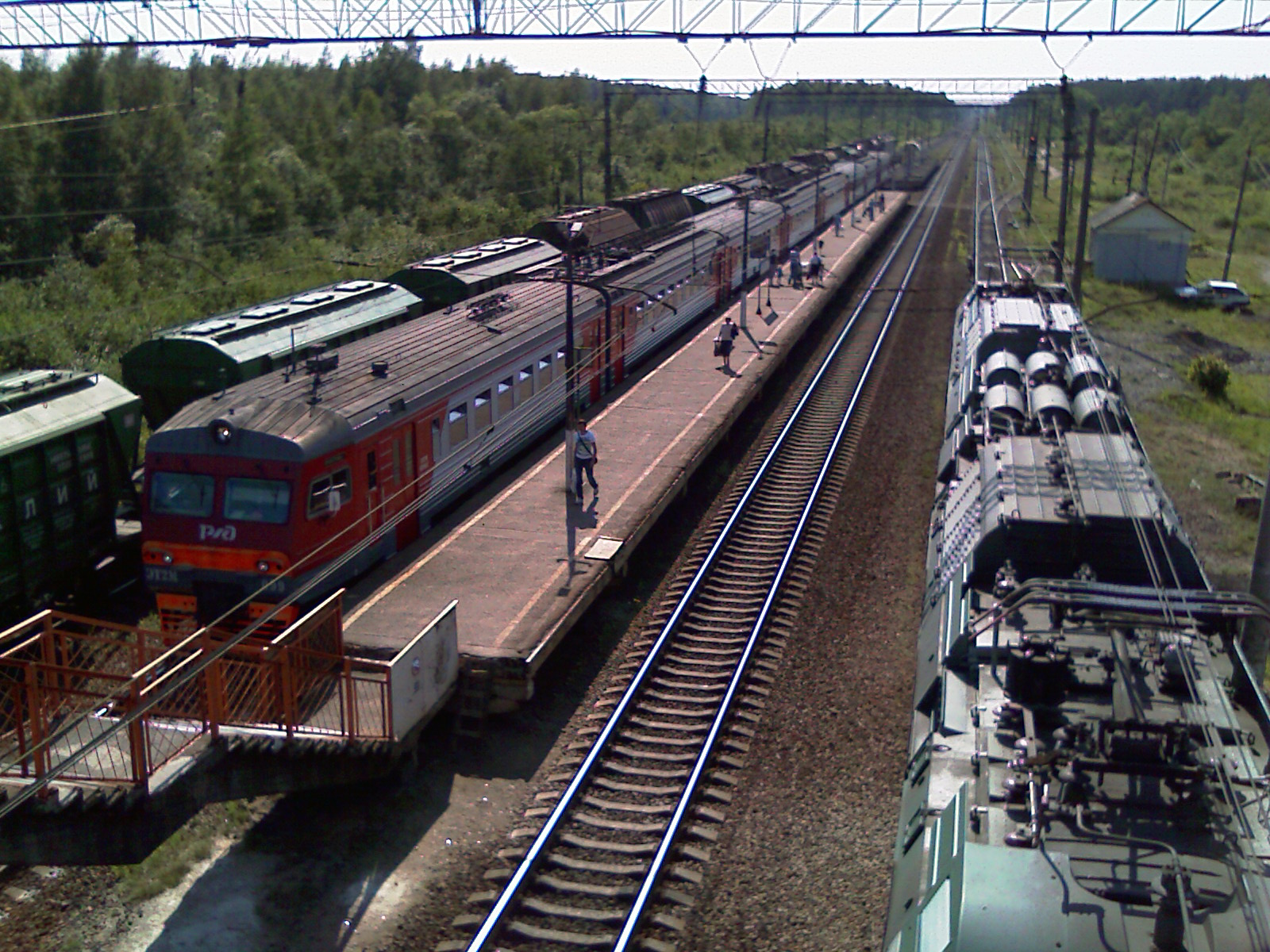

General information
- Coordinates: 59.7688°N 30.8320°E
- System: Commuter service passenger & cargo station
- Line: Saint Petersburg Moskovskiy - MGA
- Platforms: 1 island
- Tracks: 6

Other information
- Station code: 030608
- Fare zone: 5

History
- Opened: 1911
Location

Pella (Russian: Пе́лла) is a railway station located in Otradnoye (suburb of Saint Petersburg), Russia. It opened in 1911 and is 36 km from the Moskovsky railway station.

There is another railway station within the city: Ivanovskaya railway station.

== Gallery ==
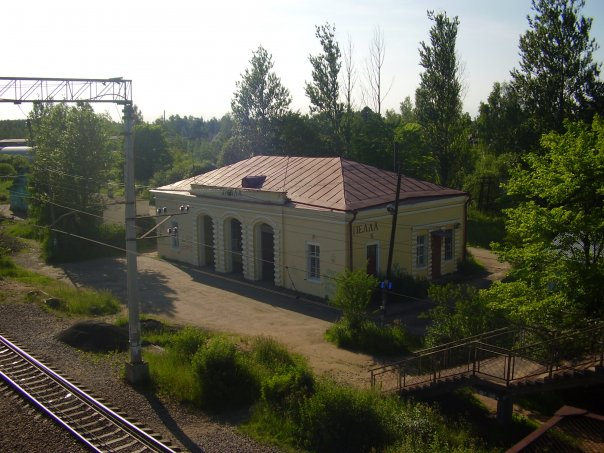

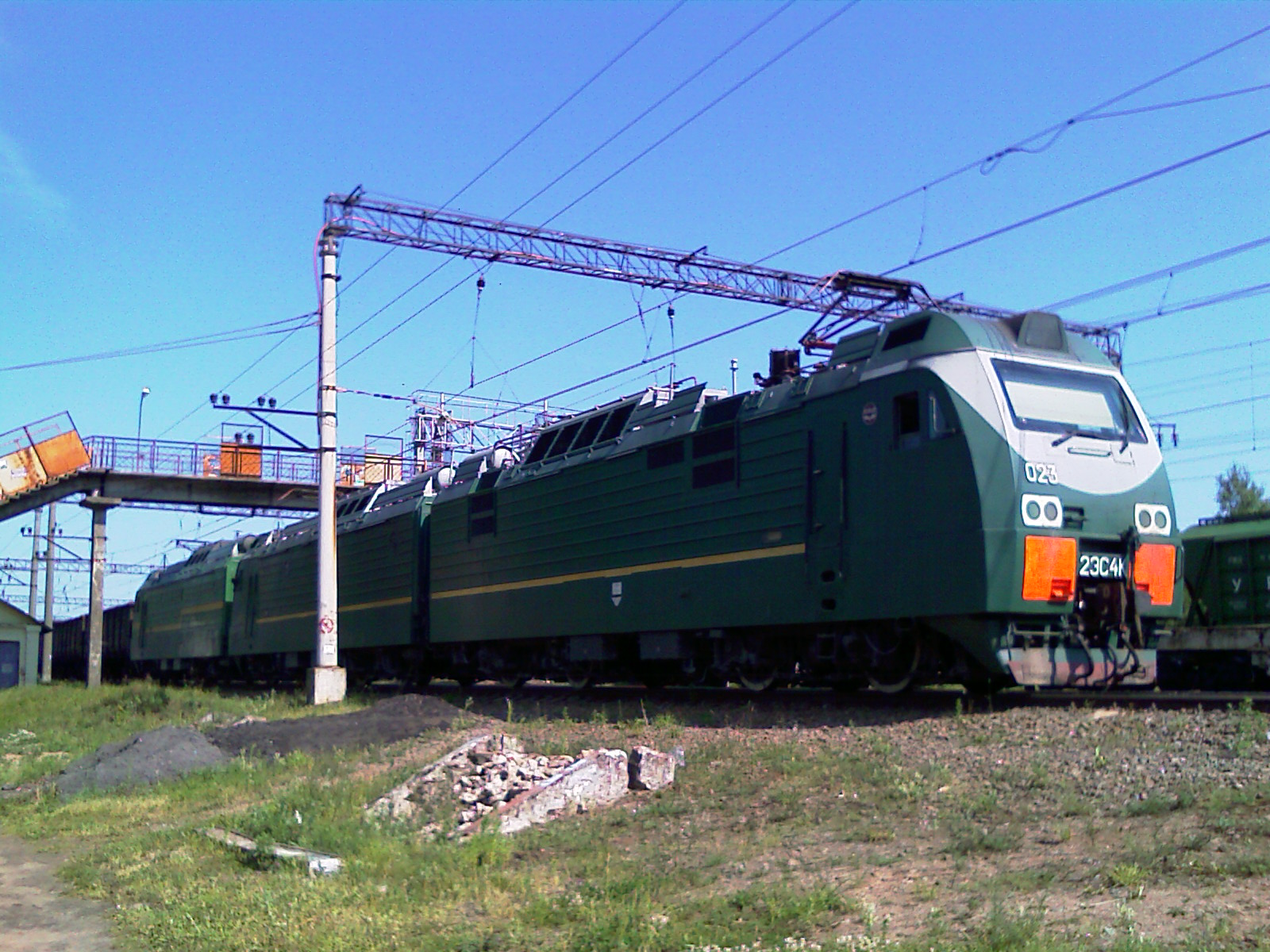

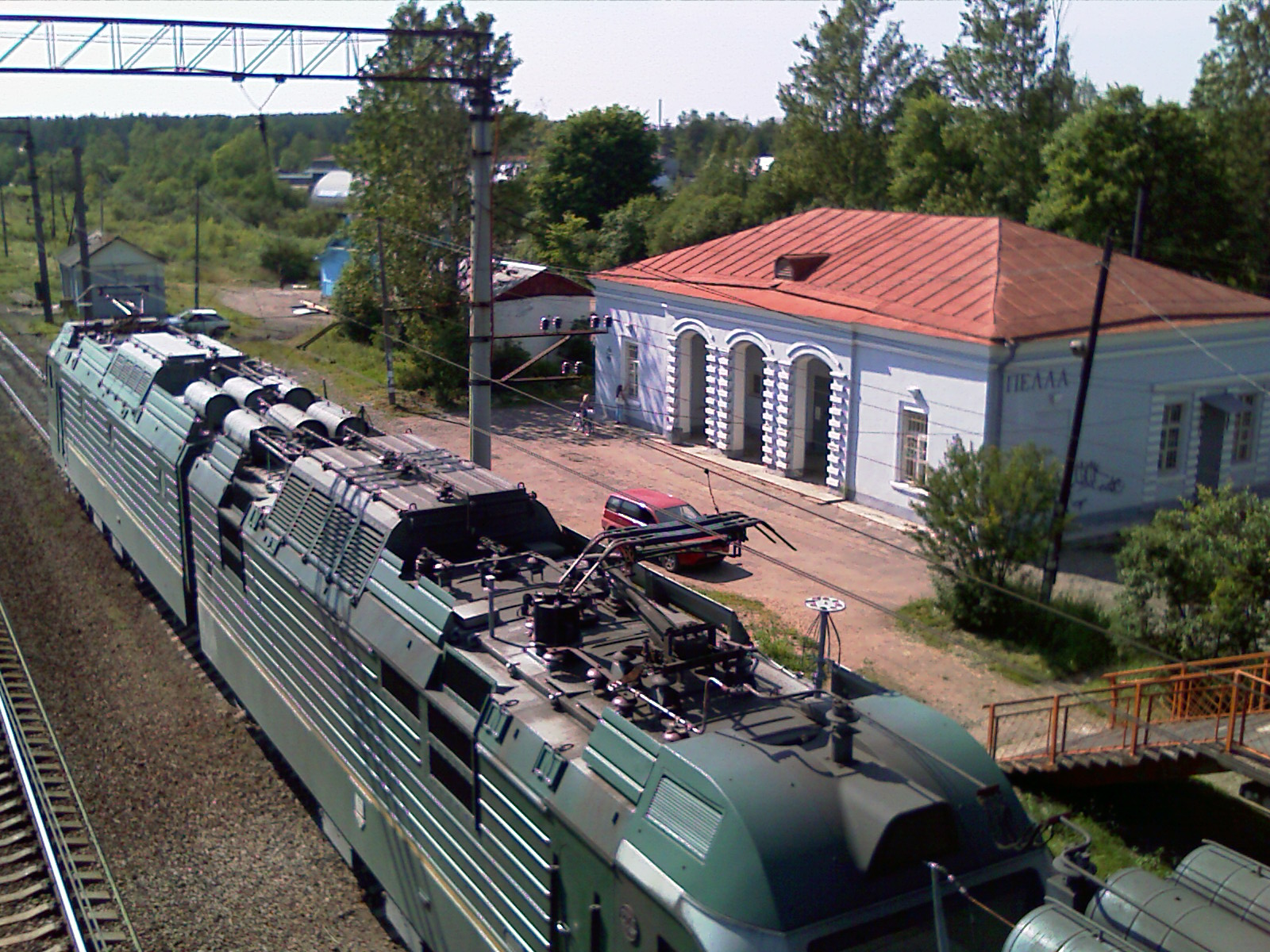

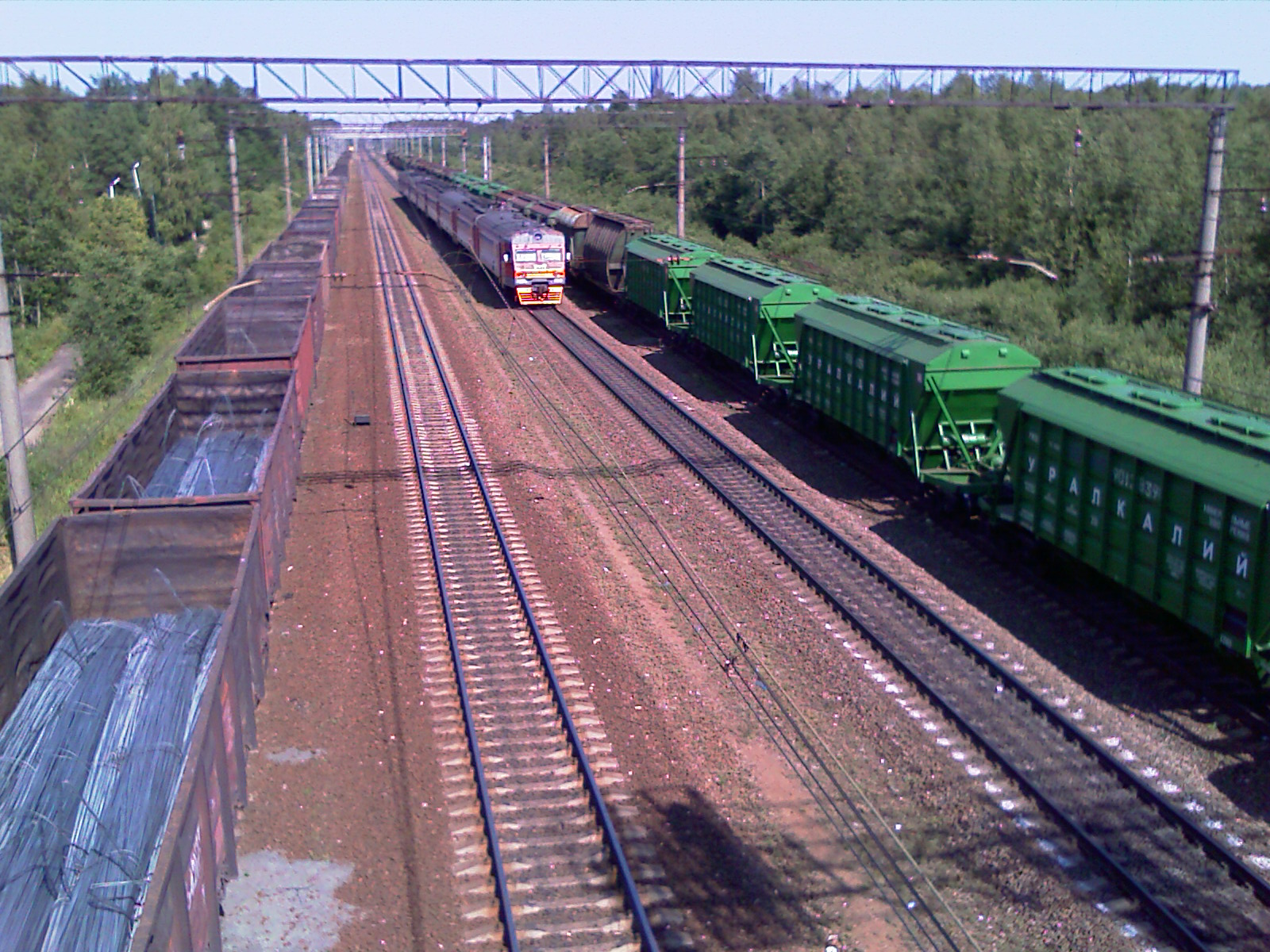
