= Yevgeny Litovchenko =

Ukrainian murderer, serial rapist and suspected serial killer

- Born: March 8, 1971 (age 55); Lisovichi, Kyiv Oblast, UkSSR
- Convictions: Murder; Rape
- Penalty: Russia: 12 years imprisonment (1990s rape charges); Ukraine: Life imprisonment

Details
- Victims: 1–5
- Span of crimes: 2006–2014
- Country: Ukraine (convicted); Russia (suspected)
- States: Kyiv (convicted); Leningrad (suspected)
- Date apprehended: For the final time on July 5, 2014

Yevgeny Anatolyevich Litovchenko (Russian: Евгений Анатольевич Литовченко; Ukrainian: Євген Анатолійович Литовченко, romanized: Yevhen Anatoliiovych Lytovchenko) is a Ukrainian murderer, serial rapist and suspected serial killer. The prime suspect in at least 4 murders and a series of rapes in Leningrad Oblast, Russia, from 2006 to 2014, he was detained by Russian authorities and confessed to the crimes, but escaped during an investigative experiment on June 6, 2014.

A month after this, Litovchenko murdered a girl in Kyiv, Ukraine, for which he was tried, convicted and sentenced to life imprisonment. Following his conviction, the Russian government requested for his extradition, but this never occurred due to the subsequent breakdown of diplomatic relations between the two countries. As a result, he was never prosecuted for the crimes he committed on Russian territory.

== Early life ==
Yevgeny Litovchenko was born on March 8, 1971, in the village of Lisovichi, Kyiv Oblast, in the Ukrainian SSR. News sources claim that he grew up in a stable environment and that his parents had no known negative qualities that could affect his upbringing. After finishing school, Litovchenko graduated from a vocational school and began a career in manual labor.

Following the collapse of the USSR and the economic reforms that followed, the Litovchenko family began to experience financial difficulties. During the 1990s, Yevgeny changed several jobs, mainly consisting of low-skilled labor, and in 1999, he left his native village, telling his parents that he was going to Saint Petersburg to earn money. Once in Russia, Litovchenko settled in Otradnoye, Leningrad Oblast, where he soon began raping underage girls. Although suspected in a total of eight rapes, he was only charged with three, convicted for these counts and sentenced to 12 years imprisonment in 2000, but served only nine before being paroled.

== Arrest and exposure ==
In April 2014, Litovchenko tricked an eight-grade girl to accompany him to the forest near Gorodishchi in the Kirovsky District, where he raped her. According to the victim's testimony, Litovchenko attempted to strangle her after the assault, but she managed to fight back and escape. She remembered his features and the license plate on his car, leading to her assailant's arrest. During interrogations, Litovchenko quickly cracked under pressure and wrote four confessions describing various crimes, including at least four murders. These were the following:

- rape and murder of an underage girl at a penal colony in the Kingiseppsky District in 2006
- rape of two girls in Nevskaya Dubrovka in the summer of 2010
- rape and murder of a girl in a gardening community in the same area in 2012
- rape and murder of a 28-year-old woman in the Druzhba gardening community

The most notorious crime he admitted to was the murder of 6-year-old Pavel Kostyunin, who went missing from Otradnoye on December 6, 2011. He was last seen after leaving school, with various theories suggesting different possibilities about what had happened to him, including being abducted by gypsies or being killed in an automobile accident and the driver hiding the body. Kostyunin's parents were also initially held as suspects in his disappearance, but were released a polygraph test could not conclude with certainty that they were involved.

At the time, the Kostyunin case caused a huge outcry from the public, leading to Governor Alexander Drozdenko to offer a reward of 500,000 rubles for any information on the child's whereabouts. Litovchenko claimed that on that day, he was driving past the boy's house when he saw him, spontaneously stopped the car and abducted him. This was indirectly corroborated by the call history on Kostyunin's phone - a few minutes prior to his disappearance, he had called him mother and told her that he would be home any minute, after which he made an outgoing call that was quickly dropped and the phone was turned off after that.

== Escape ==
During the course of the investigation, Litovchenko agreed to show where he had disposed of Kostyunin's body. Initially, he claimed that he had thrown it into the Neva and even indicated an approximate location where it supposedly washed ashore. However, he later changed his testimony to claiming he had strangled the boy and buried the body in a forest area 300 meters away from the Gorky Railway Station, near the 84th power line pole in Otradnoye.

On June 6, 2014, Litovchenko was brought to Otradnoye under escort from two police officers, Evgeny Kostyuk and Lt. Col. Denis Tsaryov. According to Kostyuk, after arriving in the area, Litovchenko asked to take off his jacket because it was too hot, after which Kostyuk handcuffed his hands from the front, but unhooked them from himself. Tsaryov noticed this, but did not react in any way. After that, another investigator, Alexander Rumyantsev, directed them to where they should go, but for unclear reasons did not accompany the two officers. Kostyuk claimed that after a few minutes wandering through the swampy terrain, his partner Tsaryov left, supposedly distracted by a phone call, leaving both him and the convict alone. A few minutes later, Litovchenko pointed out the place where he had buried the body, and then asked permission to go aside to relieve himself, which was granted.

While Litovchenko was relieving himself, Kostyuk grabbed a stick and started picking a hole to find the corpse until he heard that the convict was moving. He then turned to follow him, but Litovchenko started running as fast as possible, prompting Kostyuk to draw his weapon and fire at him, missing his target. During the chase, Litovchenko managed to get rid of his oversized rubber boots and continued running barefoot. Kostyuk attempted to catch up with him, but accidentally fell and twisted his leg.

Litovchenko successfully escaped, and later on, an investigative directorate charged the officers and Rumyantsev with negligence. During the investigation, Kostyuk attempted to place the blame on his supervisors, claiming that they explained all of his and his colleagues' mistakes only after Litovchenko had managed to escape. His claims were disregarded, and all three men were fired, while station chief Valery Bulychyov was relieved of his post.

=== Manhunt ===
Following his escape, Litovchenko was put on a federal wanted list. A task force was created for his capture, made up from staff at the Kirovsky District's police department and the Ministry of Internal Affairs amounting to 400 people, including police dogs and a helicopter with thermal imaging. The search expanded all the way to Saint Petersburg and the entire Leningrad Oblast, with officers patrolling all exits from the cities, airports, sea, railroad and bus stations. Despite a reward of one million rubles being offered to catch the criminal, Litovchenko was not captured, and on June 10, he was put on an international wanted list.

== New murder and arrest ==
Litovchenko successfully evaded arrest and slipped into Ukraine. On July 3, he was loitering around the village of Vita-Postova, Kyiv Oblast, when he noticed 18-year-old Alina Tymoshchuk, a student at the Academy of Internal Affairs of Ukraine, going to a local bus stop to visit her parents. He started chasing her and caught up with her near the entry to a pedestrian bridge across the Kyiv-Odesa Highway, after which he draggted Tymoshchuk to a dense wooded area. There, he raped and strangled her, stealing money, gold jewelry and a cell phone from her.

A later autopsy concluded that Tymoshchuk was severely beaten, with several hemorrhages recorded in her stomach and other internal organs. She was pronounced dead on her birthday.

While investigating her murder, investigators from Kyiv Oblast noticed that Tymoshchuk's cell phone was pinged on the day of her death in Kyiv, and then a second time in the Kherson Oblast. A few hours after the phone was detected in Skadovsk, it was located and Litovchenko himself was arrested while boarding a bus. When searched, officers found all of the stolen belongings.

Following his arrest, Litovchenko claimed that his escape from Russia, he managed to get to Ukraine in just two days, taking a "detour" and wandering into a construction site, where local workers helped him remove the handcuffs. After spending a night there, he went to the Gorky Railway Station without being noticed and entered a freight train at night. From there, he was transported to Gomel, Belarus, from where he crossed into Ukraine on foot. Once he reached the Chernihiv Oblast, he hitchhiked to his native village of Lisovichi, where he stayed with relatives for a few weeks. Soon afterwards, on the advice of his mother, he decided to move with some other relatives on the Black Sea coast.

== Trial and sentence ==
In August 2014, Litovchenko's lawyer filed a petition for a forensic psychiatric examination to determine his client's sanity, which was granted. Litovchenko was found sane and put on trial in September 2014. The entire trial lasted only a month, and throughout the proceedings, Litovchenko spoke little and seemingly expressed no remorse for his crime. Nonetheless, he pleaded guilty, and since he refused to have a jury trial, his court-appointed lawyer was unable to come up with a stable defense for his client.

On October 17, Litovchenko was found guilty murdering Tymoshchuk and was sentenced to life imprisonment. The court did not take into account the crimes committed in Russia.

After his second arrest, the leadership of the Prosecutor General's Office of the Russian Federation and the Main Department of the Ministry of Internal Affairs of Saint Petersburg and Leningrad Oblast began negotiations with the Prosecutor General's Office of Ukraine about his extradition to Russia for the crimes committed there. The Russian side claimed that an agreement concerning the extradition had been reached, but the Ukrainian Interior Ministry denied this, noting that legislature does not allow for the extradition of Ukrainian nationals to other states and that Litovchenko's arrest was solely due to the work of Ukrainian agencies. In addition to this, the negotiations had to be done with Ukrainian Interior Minister Arsen Avakov, who himself was charged with various crimes by the Russian authorities.

In later years, due to the breakdown of diplomatic relations between the two countries, negotiations on the extradition of Litovchenko were completely terminated, and the crimes he committed in Russia officially remain unsolved.

== See also ==
- List of serial rapists
