= Gladkoye peat railway =

Coordinates: 59.64247°N 30.85387°E

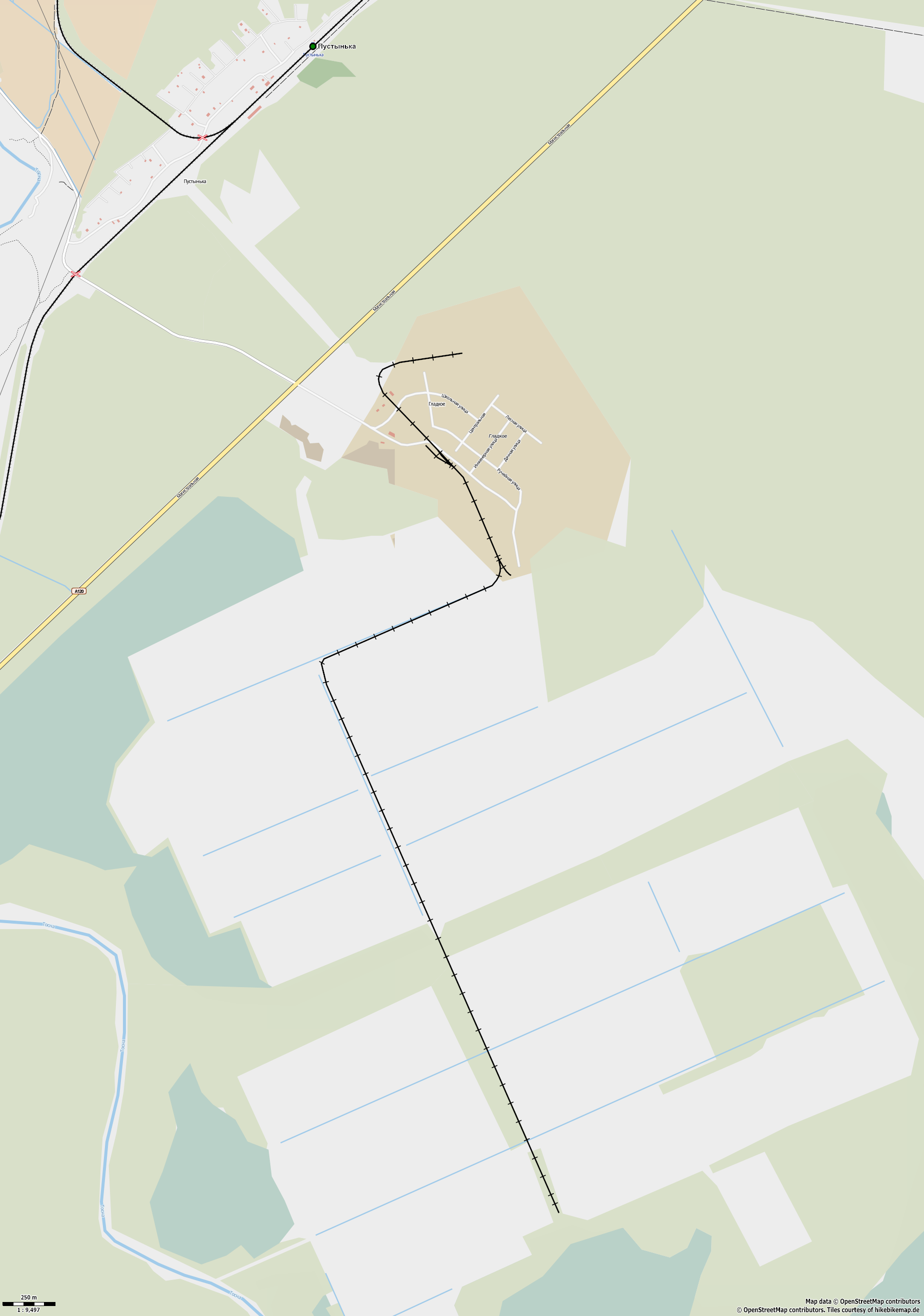

Overview
- Locale: Leningrad Oblast, Russia
- Termini: Gladkoye
- Website: www.sztc-td.ru

Service
- Type: Narrow-gauge railway
- Operator: Peat Company «Gladkoye peat»

History
- Opened: 1970

Technical
- Line length: 7 kilometres (4.3 mi)
- Track gauge: 750 mm (2 ft 5 1/2 in)

The Gladkoye peat railway (Russian: Узкоколейная железная дорога торфопредприятия «Гладкое») is located in Leningrad Oblast, Russia. The peat railway was opened in 1970, and has a total length of 7 kilometres (4.3 mi) and is operational as of 2016. The track gauge is 750 mm (2 ft 5 1/2 in). The railway operates year-round.

== Current status ==
The Gladkoye peat railway's first line was constructed in 1970, in the area of Tosnensky District, Leningrad Oblast from the village Gladkoye to the swamp peat fields. The peat railway was built for hauling milling peat and workers and operates year-round. The total length of the Gladkoye narrow-gauge railway at the peak of its development exceeded 11 kilometres (6.8 mi), of which 7 kilometres (4.3 mi) is currently operational. In 2016, repairs are being made to the track.

== Rolling stock ==
=== Locomotives ===
- TU8 – № 0073
- ESU2A – № 411, 531, 883, 907, 1018

=== Railway cars ===
- Flatcar
- Tank car
- Passenger car PV40
- Open wagon for peat TSV6A
- Hopper car to transport track ballast

=== Work trains ===
- Snowplow PSHS1 – № 168

== See also ==
- Narrow-gauge railways in Russia
- Laryan narrow-gauge railway
- Pelgorskoye peat railway
