= Evgeny Mishin =

Russian bodybuilder (1976–2024)

- Professional bodybuilder

Personal info
- Born: 21 February 1976; Otradnoye, Kirovsky District, Leningrad Oblast, Russian SFSR, USSR
- Died: 17 August 2024 (aged 48); Long Island, New York, United States

Best statistics
- Height: 6 ft 2 in (188 cm)
- Weight: 290 lb (130 kg) (Competition); 350 lb (160 kg) (Off-Season)

Evgeny Alexandrovich Mishin (Russian: Евгений Александрович Мишин; 21 February 1976 – 17 August 2024) was a Russian IFBB professional bodybuilder, personal trainer, model and actor.

== Biography ==
Mishin was born in the village of Otradnoye, near St. Petersburg. His mother was a doctor and his father a sailor. He gained wider recognition as an actor in television commercials for Applegate's Organic Meats, NY Lottery Powerball, Coca-Cola Superball, Elder Plan. He appeared on television shows Power on Starz, The Punisher on Netflix, and The Blacklist on NBC.

Mishin resided in New York. He stood 6 feet 2 inches (1.88 m) and weighed 290 pounds (130 kg) in-season and 350 pounds (160 kg) off-season. Mishin died in Los Angeles on 17 August 2024, at the age of 48 after he reportedly suddenly stopped breathing, and died despite medics trying to revive him.

== Contest history ==
- 2011 IFBB Mr. Olympia – 17th
- 2011 IFBB Europa Pro – 3rd
- 2010 IFBB Mr. Olympia – 17th
- 2010 IFBB Europa Pro – 3rd
- 2010 IFBB New York Pro – 6th
- 2010 IFBB Europa Pro – 3rd
- 2009 IFBB New York Pro – 8th
- 2008 IFBB New York Pro – 15th
- 2008 IFBB Houston Pro – 10th
- 2006 IFBB Ironman – 17th
- 2006 San Francisco – 17th
- 2006 Colorado – 17th
- 2006 New York Pro – 18th
- 2004 IFBB Night of Champions – 19th
- 2003 IFBB Night of Champions – 20th
- 2002 Championship of Europe – 1st
- 2002 Championship of Russia – 1st
- 2002 Championship of Russia (Spring) – 1st
- 2002 Championship of Russia (Autumn) – 1st (couples posing)
- 1997 International Championship of Powerlifting – 2nd
- 1997 Championship of Russia (Powerlifting) – 1st
- 1995 Championship of Russia (Powerlifting) – 1st

== See also ==
- List of male professional bodybuilders
- List of female professional bodybuilders
- Mr. Olympia
