= Pavel Alandsky =

- Born: Pavel Ivanovich Alandsky; 29 June 1844; Tosno, Saint Petersburg Governorate, Russian Empire
- Died: 28 October 1883 (aged 39); Kiev Governorate, Russian Empire
- Occupations: historian and academic
- Years active: 1873–1883

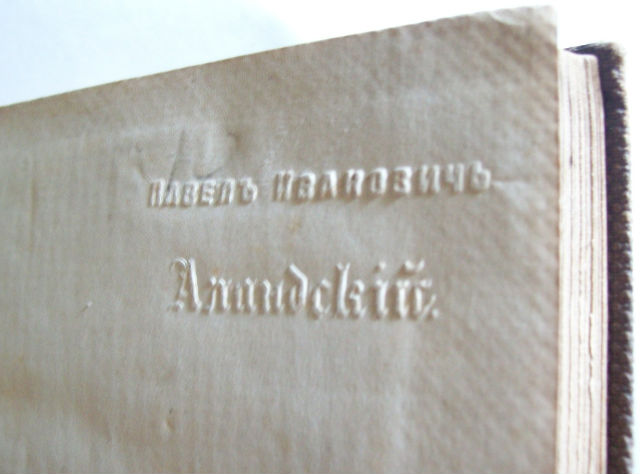
Imprinted lettering in Adlansky book (pre-1918)

Pavel Ivanovich Alandsky (Russian: Па́вел Ива́нович Ала́ндский; 17 June [O.S. 5 June] 1844 – 16 October [O.S. 4 October] 1883) was a Russian classical philologist and historian who specialized in Ancient Greece and Ancient Rome.

== Biography ==
Alandsky was born in Tosno in the Saint Petersburg Governorate, to parents Ivan Stefanovich and Yevdokia Ivanovich. His father was the village priest in Tosno. At age 13, he entered the Alexander Nevsky seminary for boys in Saint Petersburg. In 1865, he graduated from the Saint Petersburg Theological Academy, and five years later graduated from the University of Saint Petersburg.

Starting in 1870, he taught Latin at the Nevsky seminary while furthering his studies in Greek literature at the University of Saint Petersburg. He defended his thesis on 1 April 1873, and that fall he was admitted as an assistant professor to his alma mater, where he lectured Homer's The Iliad. The next year he moved to Kiev, where he became a lecturer at the University of Saint Vladimir. In 1877, the university sent him to study ancient art monuments in Florence, Rome and Naples. Starting in 1878, he also taught history at the Kiev University for Women.

In 1883, Alandsky died just 39, apparently killed on a fishing trip. He was buried at the prestigious Baikove Cemetery in Kiev, where his tomb (now destroyed) once bore a meotope of Homer, along with the inscription: "He knew all about the depths of the past, but he could not foresee the terrible event that happened to him on a fishing trip."

== Bibliography ==
Alandsky left behind several unfinished works, but also contributed several well-respected books and a guidebook for teaching high-school Latin. His master's thesis, a study of the conjunctive used in The Iliad and The Odyssey, was published in Russian in 1873 and translated into French, German and Italian. Analysis of his body of work show he was a follower of the schools of philologists Heymann Steinthal and Berthold Delbrück.

- Синтаксические исследования. Значение и употребление coniunctivi в языке Илиады и Одиссеи (A Syntactic Study. Language and Use of the Conjunctive in The Iliad and The Odyssey (1873)
- Поэзия как предмет науки (Poetry as a Subject of Science) (1875)
- Изображение душевных движений в трагедиях Софокла (Spiritual movements in Sophocles' Tragedies) (1877)
- Филологическое изучение произведений Софокла (Philological Study of Sophocles' Works) (1877)
- Обозрение истории Греции (Review of Greek History of Greece) (1879)
- Древнейший период истории Рима и его изучение (The Earliest Period of history of Rome and Its Study (1882)
- Записки по истории Греции (Notes on Greek History) (1883)
- История Греции (History of Greece) (1885)
