= Pelgorskoye peat railway =

Railway line in Russia

Coordinates: 59.43034°N 31.17238°E

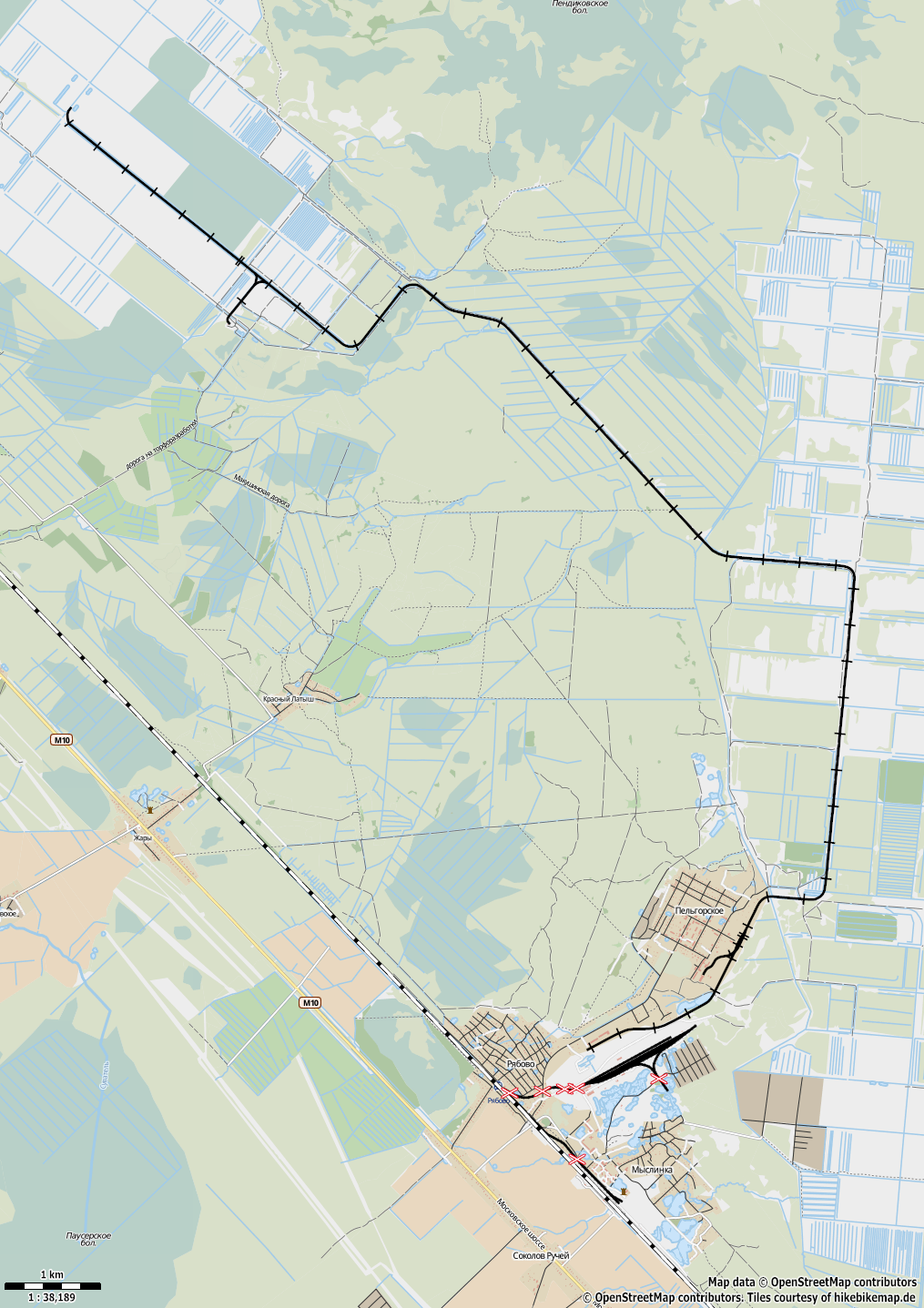

Overview
- Locale: Leningrad Oblast, Russia
- Termini: Ryabovo
- Website: www.pelgorskoe.ru

Service
- Type: Narrow-gauge railway
- Operator: Peat Company «Pelgorskoe-M»

History
- Opened: 1950

Technical
- Line length: 20 kilometres (12 mi)
- Track gauge: 750 mm (2 ft 5 1/2 in)

The Pelgorskoye peat railway (Russian: Пельгорское, pel'GORskoye) is located in Leningrad Oblast, Russia. The peat railway was opened in 1950, and has a total length of 20 kilometres (12 mi); it was operational as of 2016. The track gauge is 750 mm (2 ft 5 1/2 in). The railway operates year-round.

== Current status ==
The Pelgorskoye peat railway's first line was constructed in 1950s, in the Tosnensky District, Leningrad Oblast, from the Ryabovo village to the swamp peat fields. The railway was built for hauling milling peat and workers and operates year-round. In 2001 the Pelgorskoe-M Peat Company started replacing equipment and repairing the railway between the mine and the processing facilities. The total length of the Pelgorskoye narrow-gauge railway at the peak of its development exceeded 25 kilometres (16 mi), of which 20 kilometres (12 mi) is currently operational as of 2016. A peat factory was built and put into operation in 2004. In 2016, repairs were made to the track.

== Rolling stock ==
=== Locomotives ===
- TU6A – No. 1650, 1903
- TU8G – No. 0015
- ESU2A – No. 607
- TD-5U

=== Railroad car ===
- Flatcar
- Tank car
- Tank car – fire train
- Passenger car PV40
- Open wagon for peat TSV6A
- Hopper car to transport track ballast

=== Work trains ===
- Snowplow PS-1
- Track laying cranes PPR2ma – No. 275

== See also ==
- Narrow-gauge railways in Russia
- Gladkoye narrow-gauge railway
- Laryan narrow-gauge railway
