= Laryan narrow-gauge railway =

Coordinates: 59.55463°N 33.58525°E

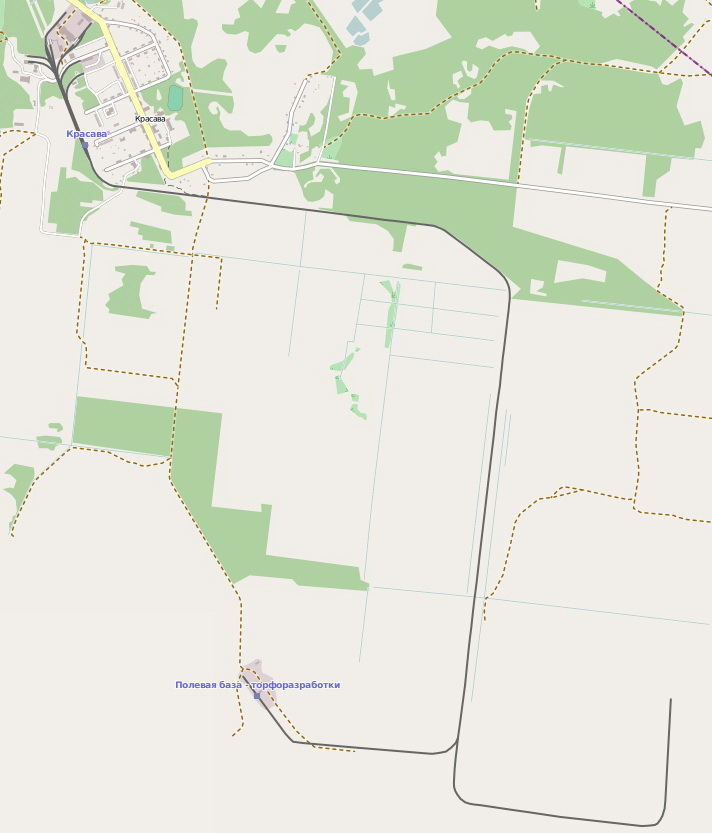

Overview
- Locale: Leningrad Oblast, Russia
- Termini: Krasava

Service
- Type: Narrow-gauge railway
- Operator(s): LLC «Tikhvin-TORF»

History
- Opened: 1939

Technical
- Line length: 8 kilometres (5.0 mi)
- Track gauge: 750 mm (2 ft 5 1/2 in)
Route map
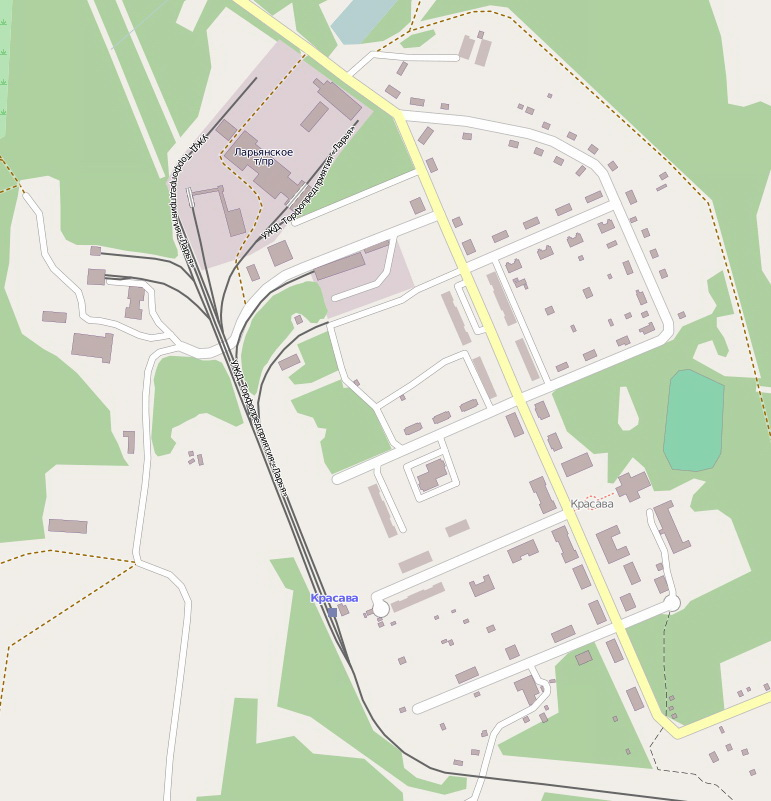

The Laryan narrow-gauge railway (Russian: Ларьян узкоколейная железная дорога, Lar'yan uzkokoleynaya zheleznaya doroga») is located in Leningrad Oblast, Russia. The peat railway was opened in 1939, and has a total length of 8 kilometres (5.0 mi) and is operational as of 2017. The track gauge is 750 mm (2 ft 5 1/2 in) and operates year-round. Limited Liability Company «Tikhvin-Torf» was established on the 16 of November in 2000 and is the successor of Peat enterprise Laryan. The main activity of the LLC «Tikhvin-TORF» company production of milled peat, semimanufactures of sod peat for household needs, peat semimanufac tures for agriculture. Deliveries of peat are made by rail for the heat-only boiler station of the village Krasava.

== Current status ==
The Peat enterprise Laryan was established in 1930s in the village Krasava, Leningrad Oblast. The Laryan peat narrow-gauge railway's first line was constructed in 1939, in the area of Tikhvinsky District, Leningrad Oblast from the village Krasava to the swamp peat fields. The peat railway was built for hauling milling peat and workers and operates year-round. The total length of the narrow-gauge railway at the peak of its development exceeded 36 kilometres (22 mi), of which 8 kilometres (5.0 mi) is currently operational. The railway operates freight services for the heat-only boiler station of the village Krasava. The railway operates scheduled freight services from Krasava, used for peat extraction tasks such as the transportation of milling peat and workers. In 2014, repairs are being made to the track.

== Rolling stock ==
=== Locomotives ===
- TU6A – № 3134, 3227
- ESU2A – № 623
- Draisine – TD-5u "Pioneer" transportation local residents

=== Railway cars ===
- Flatcar
- Tank car
- Tank car – fire train
- Passenger car PV40
- Open wagon for peat TSV6A and UMW2
- Hopper car to transport track ballast

=== Work trains ===
- Snowplow PS-1
- Track laying cranes PPR2ma – № 274

== See also ==
- Narrow-gauge railways in Russia
- List of Russian narrow-gauge railways rolling stock
- Gladkoye narrow-gauge railway
- Pelgorskoye peat narrow-gauge railway
