= Ulyanovka, Leningrad Oblast =

Urban locality in Tosnensky District of Leningrad Oblast, Russia

Ulyanovka Ульяновка
- Urban-type settlement
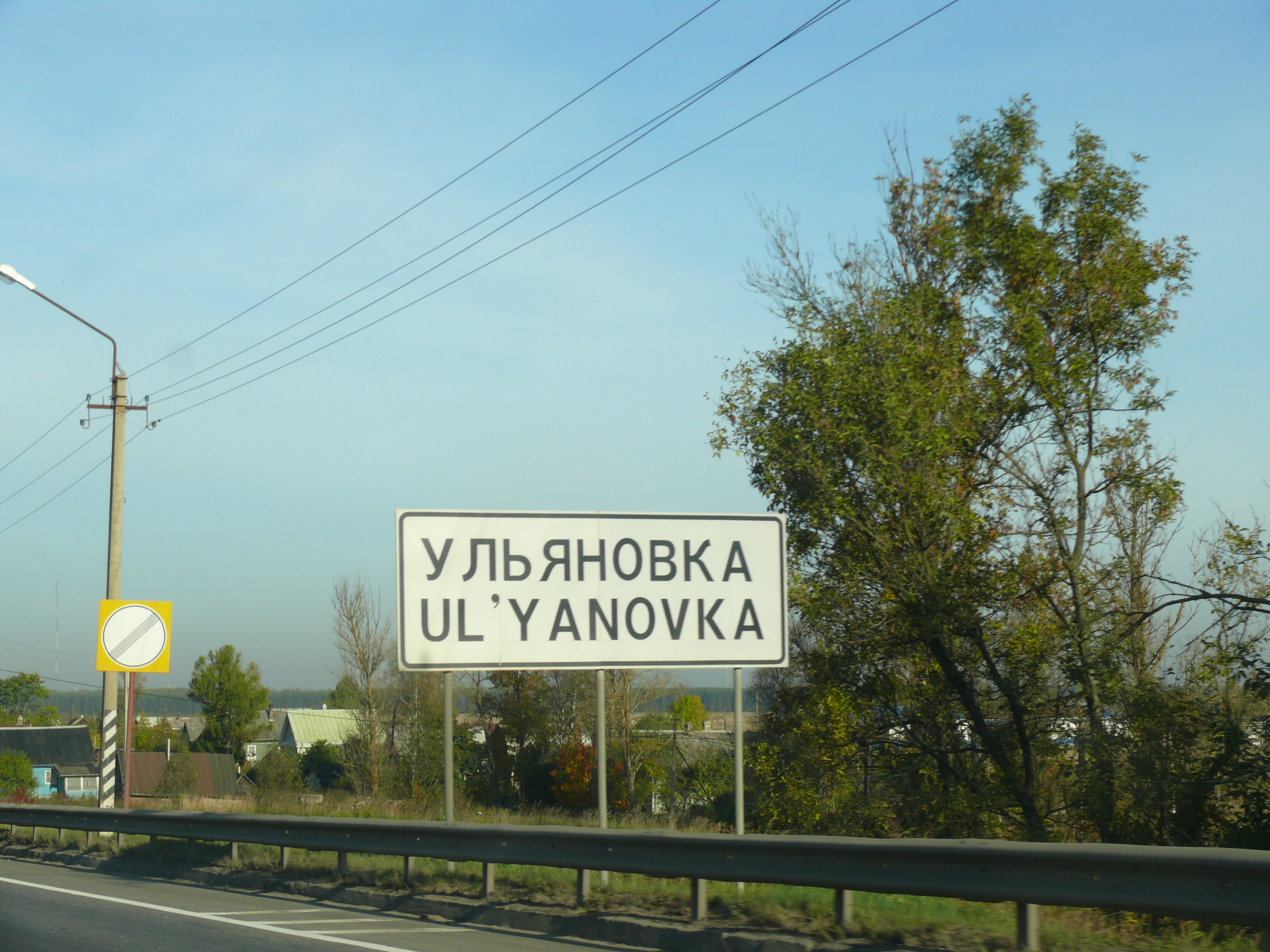
- Entrance to the settlement

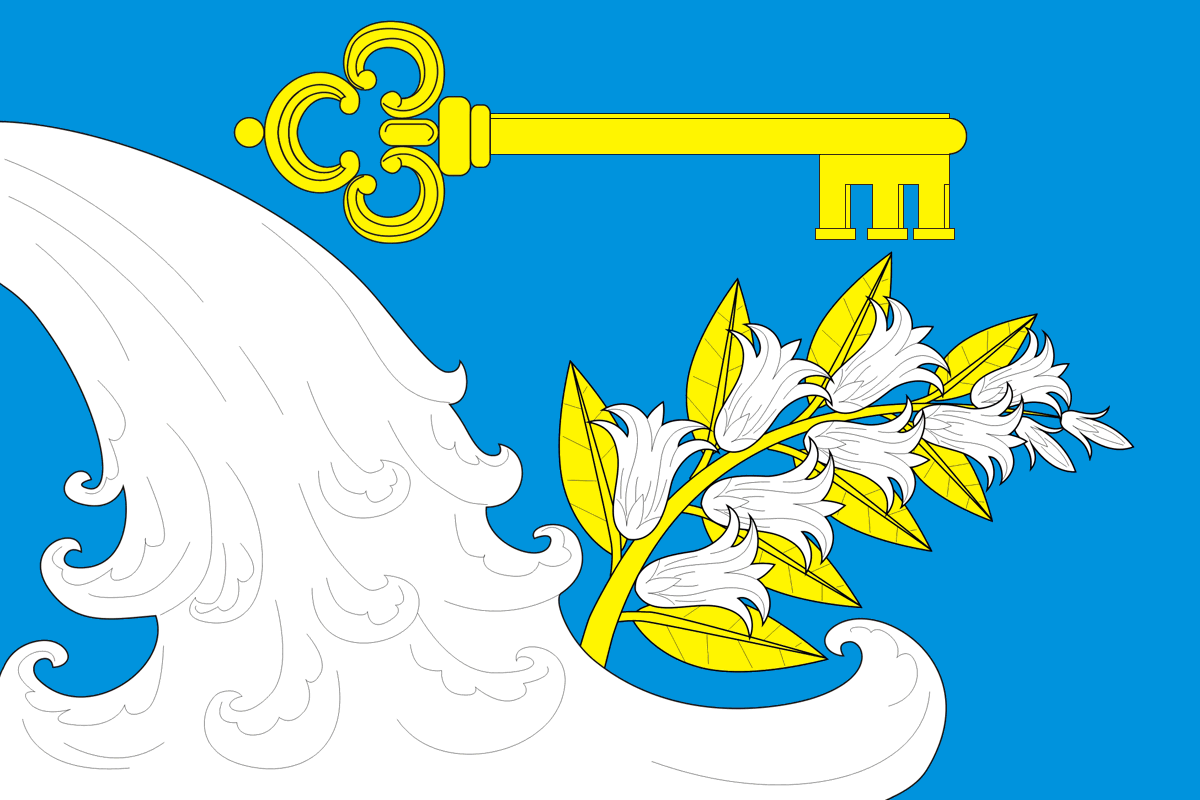
- Flag
- Interactive map of Ulyanovka
- Location of Ulyanovka Ulyanovka (Leningrad Oblast)
- Coordinates: 59°42′N 30°47′E
- Country: Russia
- Federal subject: Leningrad Oblast
- Administrative district: Tosnensky District
- Urban-type settlement status since: 1925

Population (2010 Census)
  - Total: 11,601
  - Estimate (2024): 11,267 (−2.9%)

Municipal status
  - Municipal district: Tosnensky Municipal District
  - Urban settlement: Ulyanovskoye Urban Settlement
  - Capital of: Ulyanovskoye Urban Settlement
- Time zone: UTC+3 (MSK)
- Postal code: 187010
- OKTMO ID: 41648164051
- Website: admsablino.ru

Ulyanovka (Russian: Ульяновка) is an urban locality (an urban-type settlement) in Tosnensky District of Leningrad Oblast, Russia, located approximately 40 kilometres (25 mi) southeast of the center of Saint Petersburg. Municipally it is incorporated as Ulyanovskoye Urban Settlement, one of the seven urban settlements in the district. Population: 11,601 (2010 census); 9,244 (2002 census); 9,595 (1989 Soviet census).

== History ==
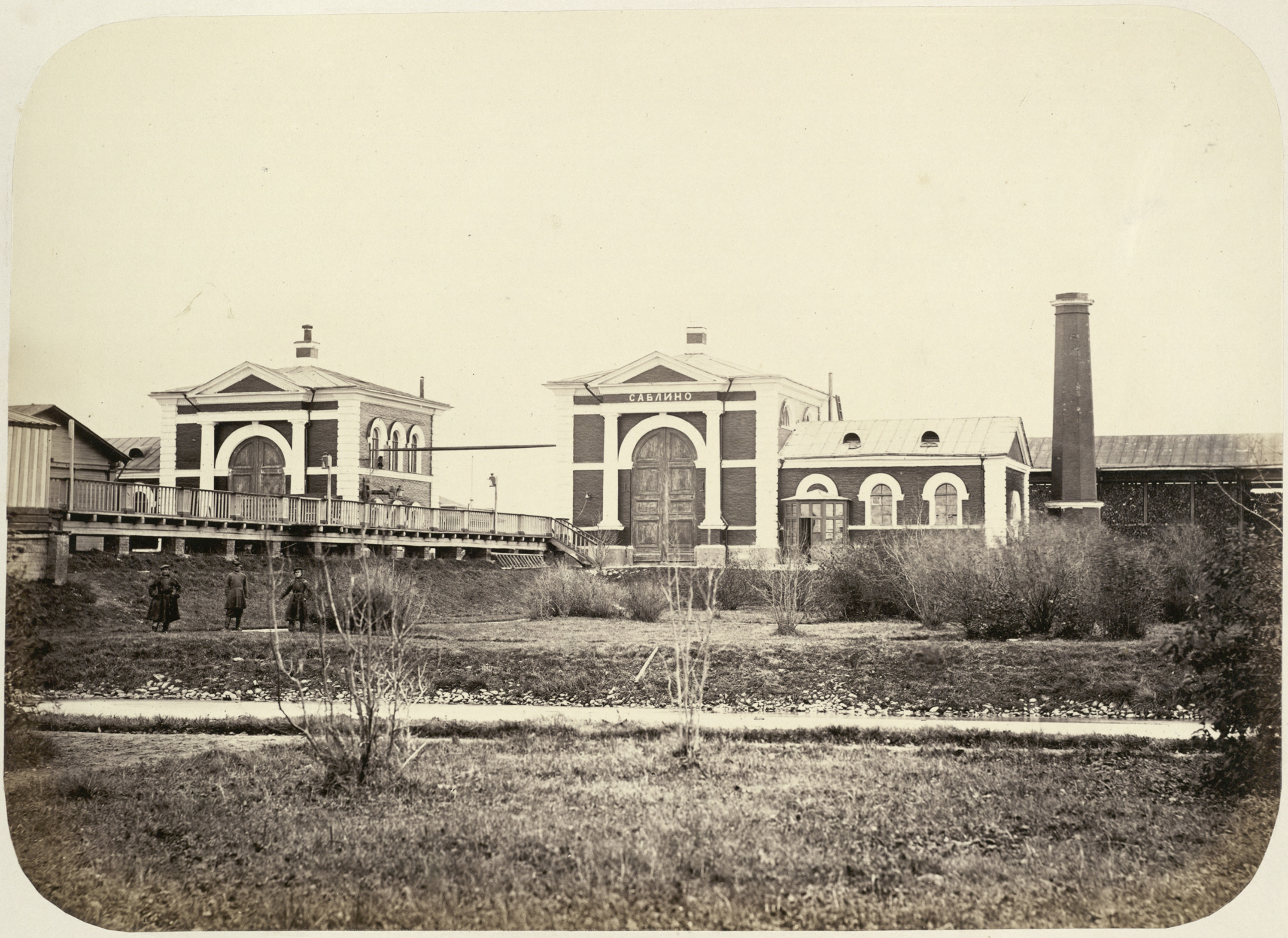
Sablino railway station in the 1860s

Until 1922, the name of Ulyanovka was Sablino. In the 1900s, Sablino was a summer house settlement, a part of Tsarskoselsky Uyezd of Saint Petersburg Governorate. In 1918, Sablino split off Tosnenskaya Volost and became the center of Sablinskaya Volost. On November 20, 1918 the uyezd was renamed Detskoselsky. Sablino was renamed Ulyanovka in 1922 after Vladimir Lenin whose original surname was Ulyanov. On August 12, 1922 Detskoselsky Uyezd was merged with Petergofsky Uyezd to form Gatchinsky Uyezd (since 1923, Trotsky Uyezd). On June 16, 1925 Ulyanovka was granted urban-type settlement status. On February 7, 1927, it was transferred to Leningradsky Uyezd. The governorate was renamed Petrogradsky in 1913 and Leningradsky in 1924.

On August 1, 1927, the uyezds were abolished and Kolpinsky District, with the administrative center in the town of Kolpino, was established. The governorates were also abolished, and the district was a part of Leningrad Okrug of Leningrad Oblast. Ulyanovka became a part of Kolpinsky District. On July 23, 1930, the okrugs were abolished as well, and the districts were directly subordinated to the oblast. On August 19, 1930 the district was abolished. Ulyanovka became a part of newly established Tosnensky District.

== Economy ==
=== Industry ===
In Ulyanovka, there is a plant producing aluminium tubes and a plant producing block timber homes.

=== Transportation ===
Ulyanovka (Sablino railway station) is an important railway node, a crossing of the Moscow – Saint Petersburg Railway and the railroad between Mga and Gatchina, encircling Saint Peterburg from the south.

The M10 highway, connecting Saint Petersburg and Moscow, passes west of Ulyanovka, and the A120 highway, which encircles Saint Petersburg, passes east and south of the settlement. Ulyanovka is additionally connected by a road with Otradnoye via Nikolskoye.

== Culture and recreation ==
Ulyanovka contains two objects classified as cultural and historical heritage of federal significance and one designated as a historical monument of local significance. The federal monuments are the houses (formerly summer houses) visited by Vladimir Lenin; one of them was owned by his sister, Anna Ulyanova. The local monument is a mass grave of soldiers fallen during World War II.
