= Ivanovskaya railway station =

Railway station in Leningrad Oblast, Russia

Ivanovskaya Ивановская
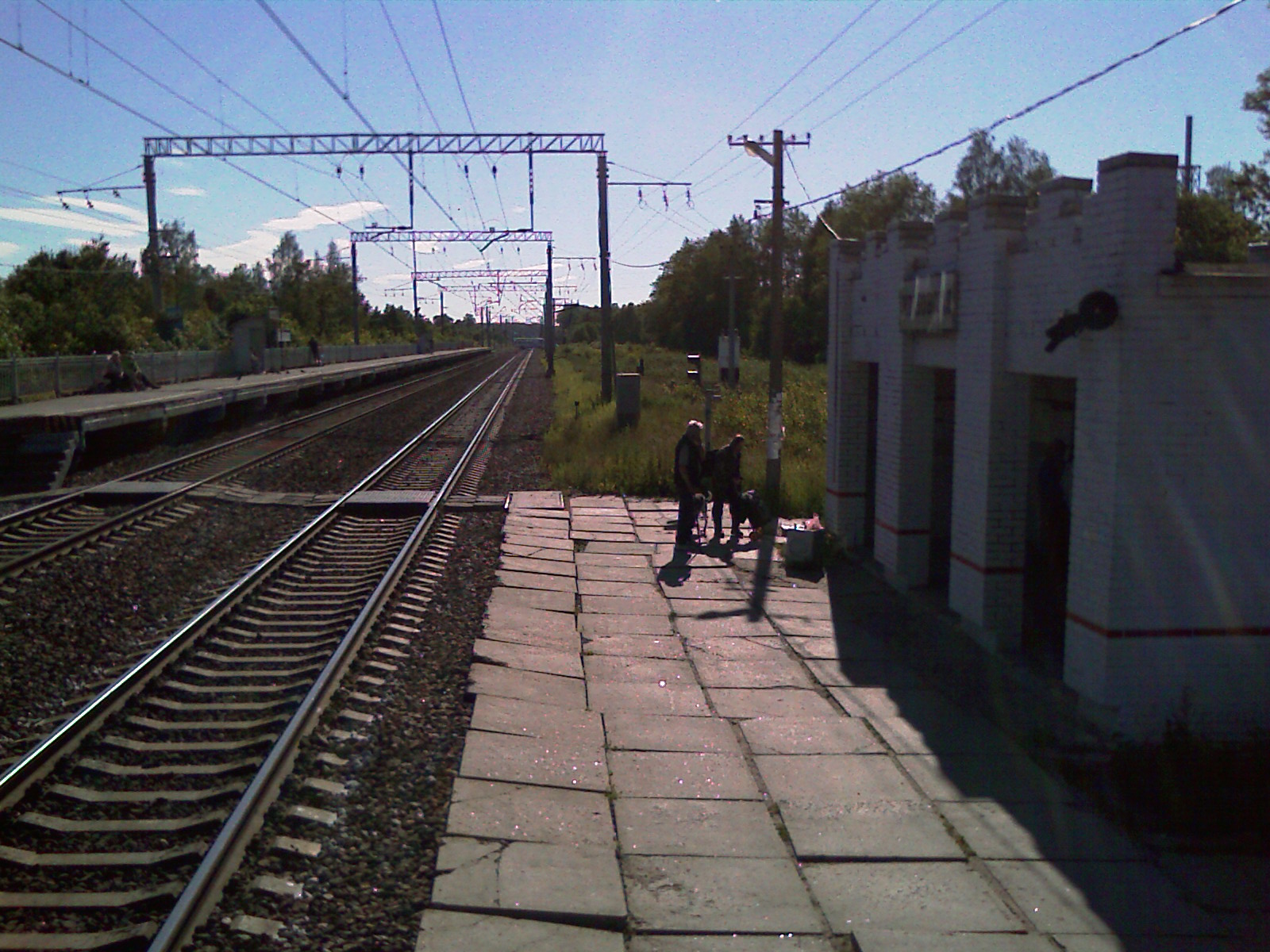

General information
- Coordinates: 59°45′36″N 30°46′46″E
- System: Commuter service passenger station
- Line: Saint Petersburg Moskovskiy - Mga
- Platforms: 2 side
- Tracks: 2
Location

Ivanovskaya (Russian: Ива́новская) is a railway station of the October railway, located in Otradnoye (suburb of Saint Petersburg), Russia. It was opened in 1918. The station is located 33 km (21 mi) from Moscow Station (the main station in St. Petersburg) on the Sapernaya - Pella stretch, the St. Petersburg - Volkhovstroy line. There are two platforms at the station which receive electric trains 12 carriages long. There is also a ticket office.

== Gallery ==
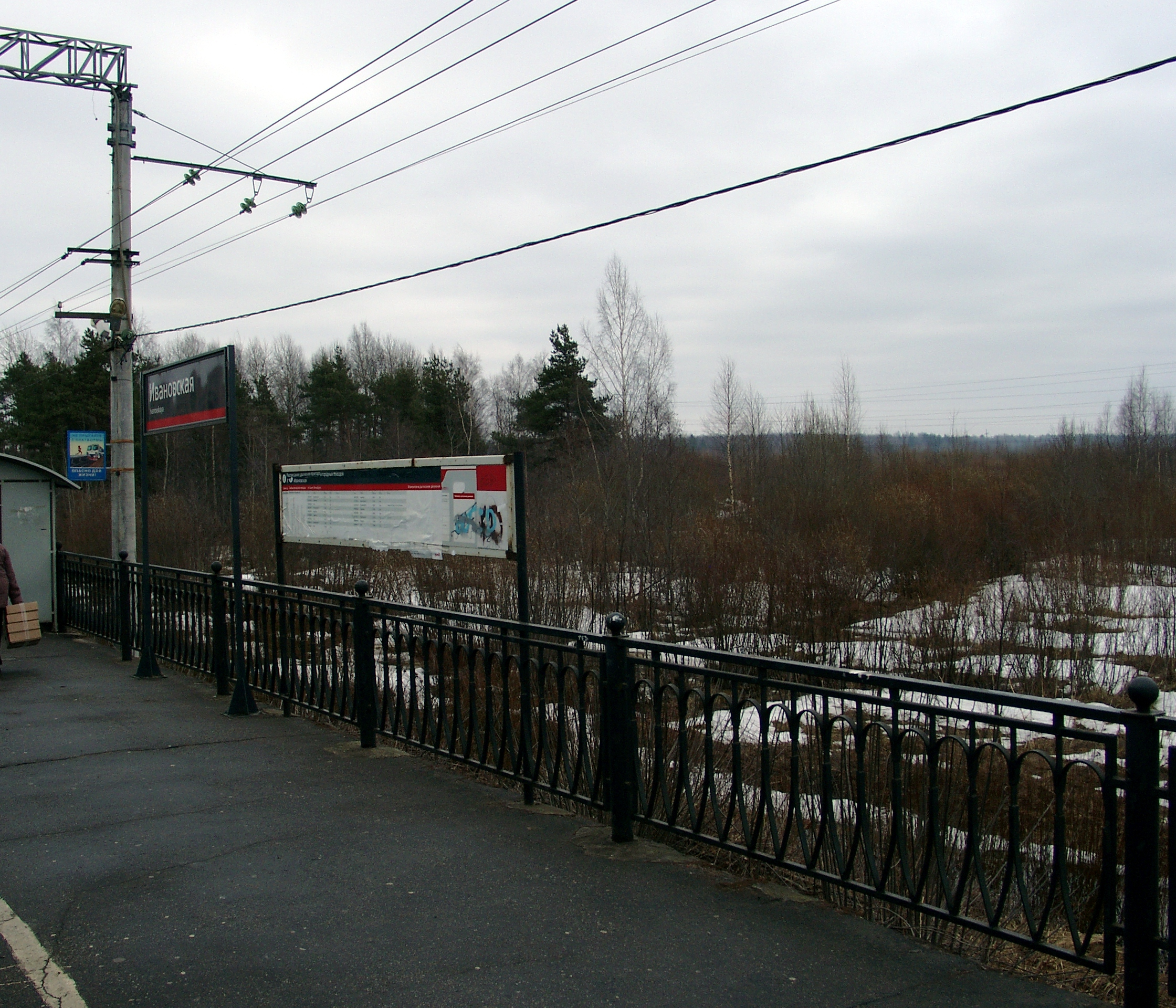
Platform for electric trains from St. Petersburg.

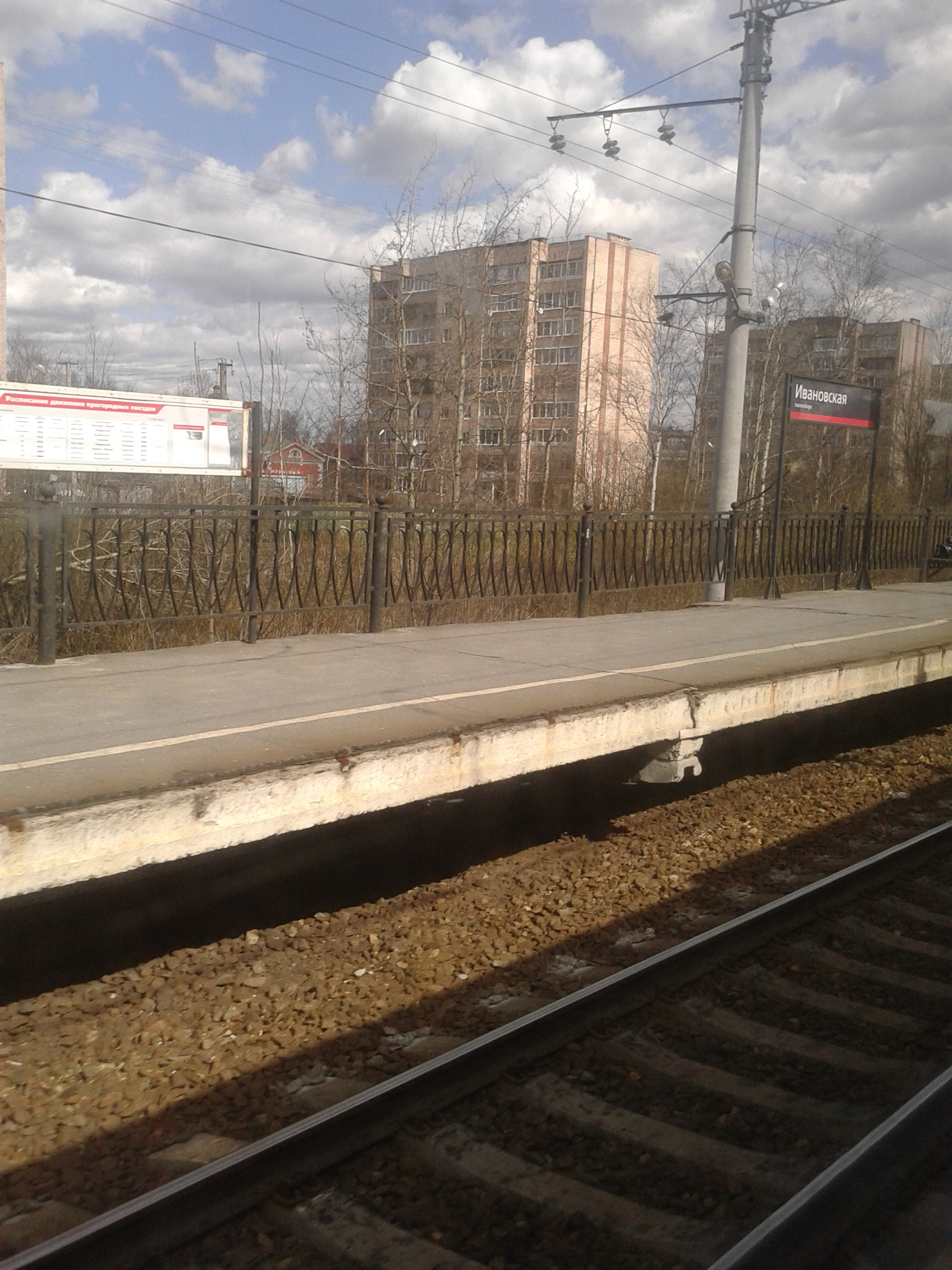
Platform for electric trains to St. Petersburg.

== Electric train schedule ==
- Расписание электропоездов на сайте tutu.ru(English: Schedule of electric trains on the website tutu.ru)
