= Otradnoye, Kirovsky District, Leningrad Oblast =

Town in Leningrad Oblast, Russia

Otradnoye Отрадное
- Town
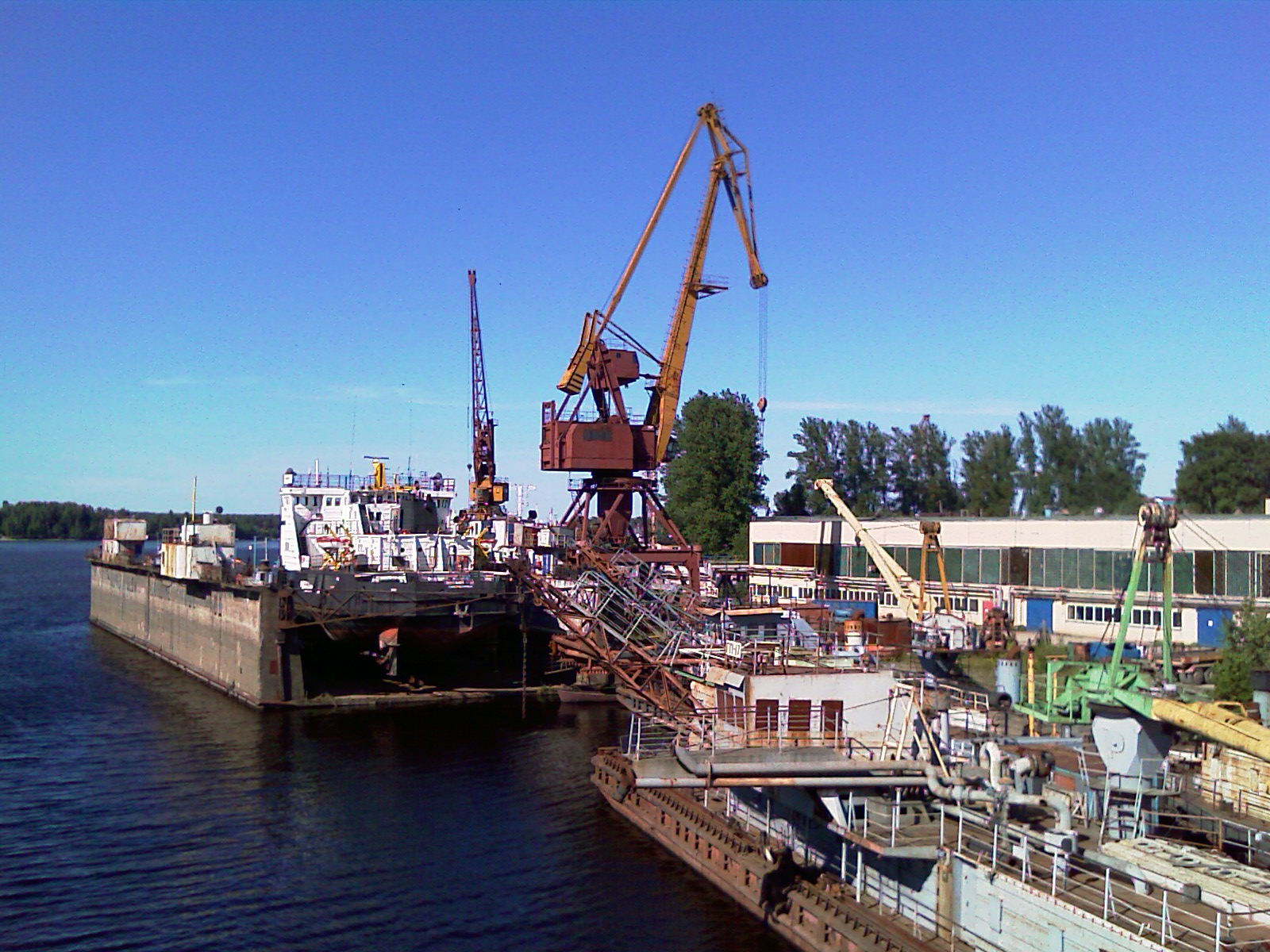
- Shipyard at the Tosna River estuary in Otradnoye

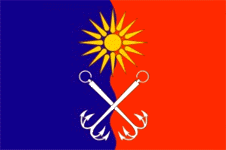
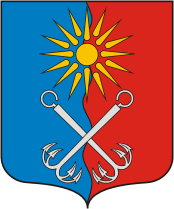
- Flag Coat of arms
- Interactive map of Otradnoye
- Location of Otradnoye Otradnoye (Leningrad Oblast)
- Coordinates: 59°47′N 30°49′E
- Country: Russia
- Federal subject: Leningrad Oblast
- Administrative district: Kirovsky District
- Settlement municipal formationSelsoviet: Otradnenskoye Settlement Municipal Formation
- Founded: 1970
- Town status since: 1970
- Elevation: 17 m (56 ft)

Population (2010 Census)
  - Total: 23,866
  - Estimate (2024): 25,258 (+5.8%)

Administrative status
  - Capital of: Otradnenskoye Settlement Municipal Formation

Municipal status
  - Municipal district: Kirovsky Municipal District
  - Urban settlement: Otradnenskoye Urban Settlement
  - Capital of: Otradnenskoye Urban Settlement
- Time zone: UTC+3 (MSK)
- Postal code: 187330–187332
- OKTMO ID: 41625104001

Otradnoye (Russian: Отра́дное) is a town in Kirovsky District of Leningrad Oblast, Russia, located 40 kilometers (25 mi) east of St. Petersburg on the left bank of the Neva River, at its confluence with the Tosna River. Population: 23,866 (2010 census); 21,570 (2002 census); 22,386 (1989 Soviet census).

== History ==
A populated place on the territory of modern Otradnoye was first mentioned in 1708 as a village of Ivanovskaya (Ива́новская) at the confluence of the Neva and the Tosna Rivers. In 1784, the land was acquired by empress Catherine the Great and a residence known as Pella estate was established. The estate was mostly destroyed on the orders of Paul I.

In the 19th century, the area was a part of Shlisselburgsky Uyezd of Saint Petersburg Governorate. On February 14, 1923, Shlisselburgsky Uyezd was merged into Petrogradsky Uyezd. In January 1924, the uyezd was renamed Leningradsky.

On August 1, 1927, the uyezds were abolished and Mginsky District, with the administrative center in the settlement of Mga, was established. Ivanovskoye became a part of Mginsky District. The governorates were also abolished and the district became a part of Leningrad Okrug of Leningrad Oblast. On August 15, 1930, the okrugs were abolished as well and the districts were directly subordinated to the oblast. On June 16, 1940, the settlement of Otradnoye was granted urban-type settlement status. Between September 1941 and January 1944, during World War II, both Ivanovskoye and Otradnoye were occupied by German troops. On December 23, 1957, the selo of Ivanovskoye was granted urban-type settlement status. On December 9, 1960, Mginsky District was abolished and split between Volkhovsky and Tosnensky Districts; Ivanovskoye remained in Tosnensky District.

The modern town of Otradnoye was established in 1970 by merging of the urban-type settlements of Otradnoye and Ivanovskoye. On April 1, 1977, Kirovsky District with the administrative center in Kirovsk, essentially in the limits of former Mginsky District, was established by splitting off Volkhovsky and Tosnensky Districts, and Otradnoye was included into the district.

== Administrative and municipal status ==
Within the framework of administrative divisions, it is incorporated within Kirovsky District as Otradnenskoye Settlement Municipal Formation. As a municipal division, Otradnenskoye Settlement Municipal Formation is incorporated within Kirovsky Municipal District as Otradnenskoye Urban Settlement.

== Economy ==
=== Industry ===
There are several industrial enterprises in Otradnoye. The Pella plant produces different sorts of machines including riverboats. Other enterprises produce electrotechnical equipment.

=== Transportation ===
A railway leading from St. Petersburg (Moskovsky railway station) to Volkhov passes through the town; there are two passenger platforms within town limits: Ivanovskaya and Pella.

Otradnoye is connected by roads with St. Petersburg, Kirovsk, and Ulyanovka (the latter one with the access to M10 Highway, connecting Moscow and St. Petersburg).

The Neva River is navigable.

== Culture and recreation ==
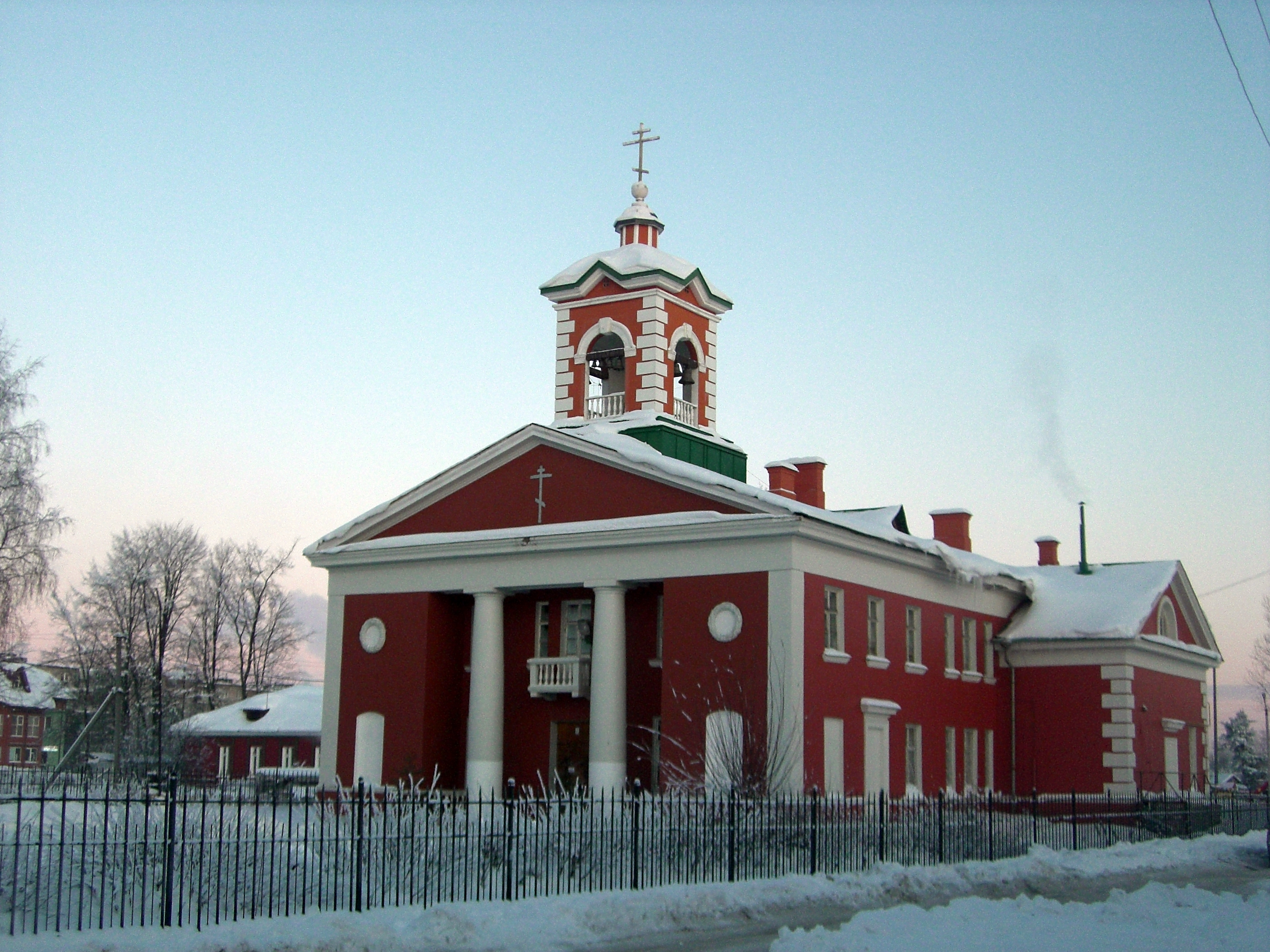
St. John's Church in Otradnoye

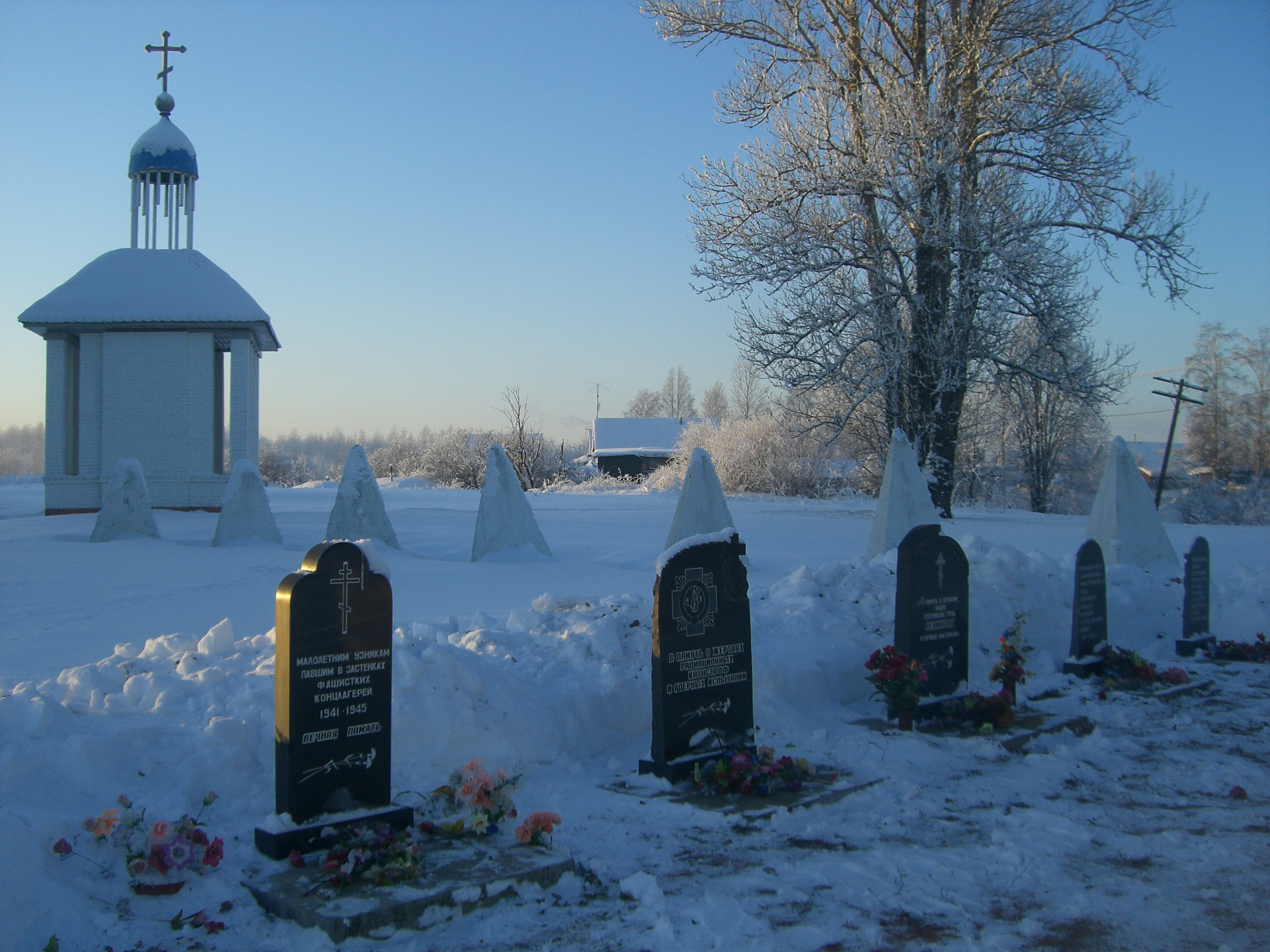
Nevsky porog World War II memorial

Otradnoye contains two cultural heritage monuments of federal significance and additionally four objects classified as cultural and historical heritage of local significance. The federal monuments are the buildings of the post station of Pella, whereas the local monuments commemorate the events of World War II.

== Notable people ==
- Evgeny Mishin, IFBB professional bodybuilder
- Zara, pop singer and actress
