= Tosno =

Town in Leningrad Oblast, Russia

Tosno Тосно
- Town
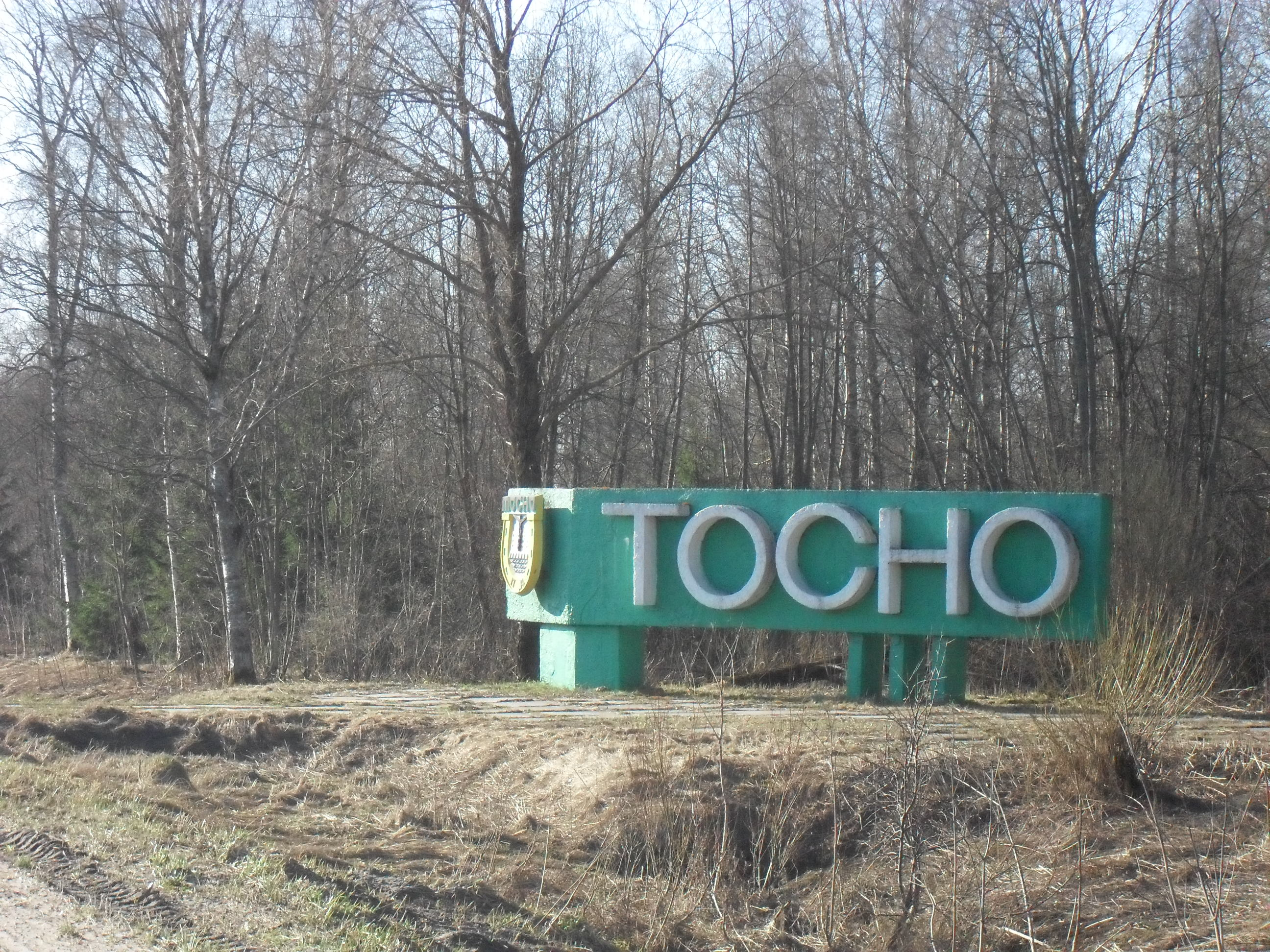
- Welcome sign at the northern entrance to Tosno

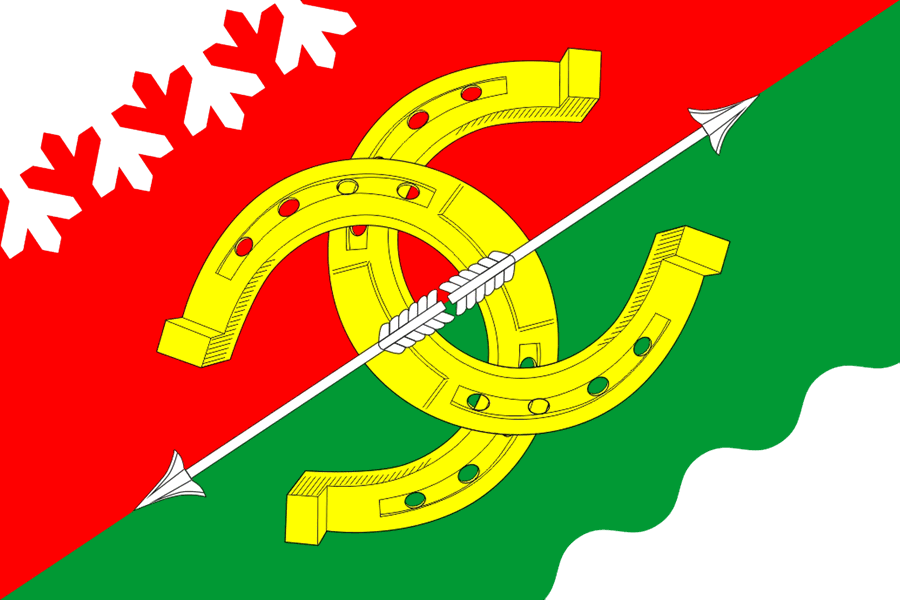
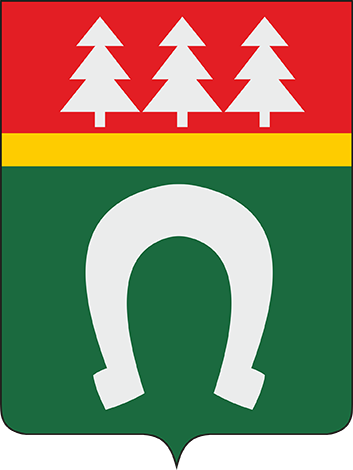
- Flag Coat of arms
- Interactive map of Tosno
- Location of Tosno Tosno (Leningrad Oblast)
- Coordinates: 59°33′N 30°54′E
- Country: Russia
- Federal subject: Leningrad Oblast
- Administrative district: Tosnensky District
- Settlement municipal formationSelsoviet: Tosnenskoye Settlement Municipal Formation
- First mentioned: 1500
- Town status since: February 1, 1963
- Elevation: 37 m (121 ft)

Population (2010 Census)
  - Total: 39,101
  - Estimate (2024): 32,074 (−18%)

Administrative status
  - Capital of: Tosnensky District, Tosnenskoye Settlement Municipal Formation

Municipal status
  - Municipal district: Tosnensky Municipal District
  - Urban settlement: Tosnenskoye Urban Settlement
  - Capital of: Tosnensky Municipal District, Tosnenskoye Urban Settlement
- Time zone: UTC+3 (MSK)
- Postal codes: 187000–187003, 187009, 187099
- OKTMO ID: 41648101001

Tosno (Russian: То́сно) is a town and the administrative center of Tosnensky District in Leningrad Oblast, Russia, located on the Tosna River, 53 kilometers (33 mi) southeast of the center of St. Petersburg. Population: 39,101 (2010 census); 38,683 (2002 census); 32,459 (1989 Soviet census).

== History ==
The village of Tosno was first mentioned in Russian chronicles in 1500. It was a part of Vodskaya Pyatina, one of the five pyatinas into which Novgorod Lands were divided. In the course of the administrative reform carried out in 1708 by Peter the Great, Tosno was included into Ingermanland Governorate (known since 1710 as St. Petersburg Governorate). Its development in the 18th and 19th centuries was mainly due to its geographic location on the road between the two Russian capitals. From 1774, it was a station at the yam route. In 1849, the railway connecting Tosno with St. Petersburg and Chudovo opened. In the 19th century, Tosno was a part of Tsarskoselsky Uyezd (renamed in 1918 Detskoselsky Uyezd); the governorate was accordingly renamed Petrogradsky in 1913 and Leningradsky in 1924).

On August 1, 1927, the uyezds were abolished and Kolpinsky District, with the administrative center in the town of Kolpino, was established. The governorates were also abolished and the district became a part of Leningrad Okrug of Leningrad Oblast. Tosno became a part of Kolpinsky District. On August 19, 1930, Kolpinsky District was abolished and Tosno became the administrative center of newly established Tosnensky District. On August 20, 1935, Tosno was granted urban-type settlement status. Between August 28, 1941 and January 26, 1944, during World War II, Tosno was occupied by German troops and largely destroyed, but rebuilt after the war. On February 1, 1963, Tosno was granted town status.

== Administrative and municipal status ==
Within the framework of administrative divisions, Tosno serves as the administrative center of Tosnensky District. As an administrative division, it is, together with eighteen rural localities, incorporated within Tosnensky District as Tosnenskoye Settlement Municipal Formation. As a municipal division, Tosnenskoye Settlement Municipal Formation is incorporated within Tosnensky Municipal District as Tosnenskoye Urban Settlement.

== Economy ==
=== Industry ===
A plant owned by the Caterpillar in Tosno produces trucks for quarries. There are also several enterprises related to construction industry. After February 2022, as a result of sanctions against the Russian Federation, Caterpillar was forced to suspend production, then the plant was sold and converted to other production facilities.

The same thing happened to the factory of the German Henkel concern, but the production of the same goods, but with different names, continued there.

=== Transportation ===
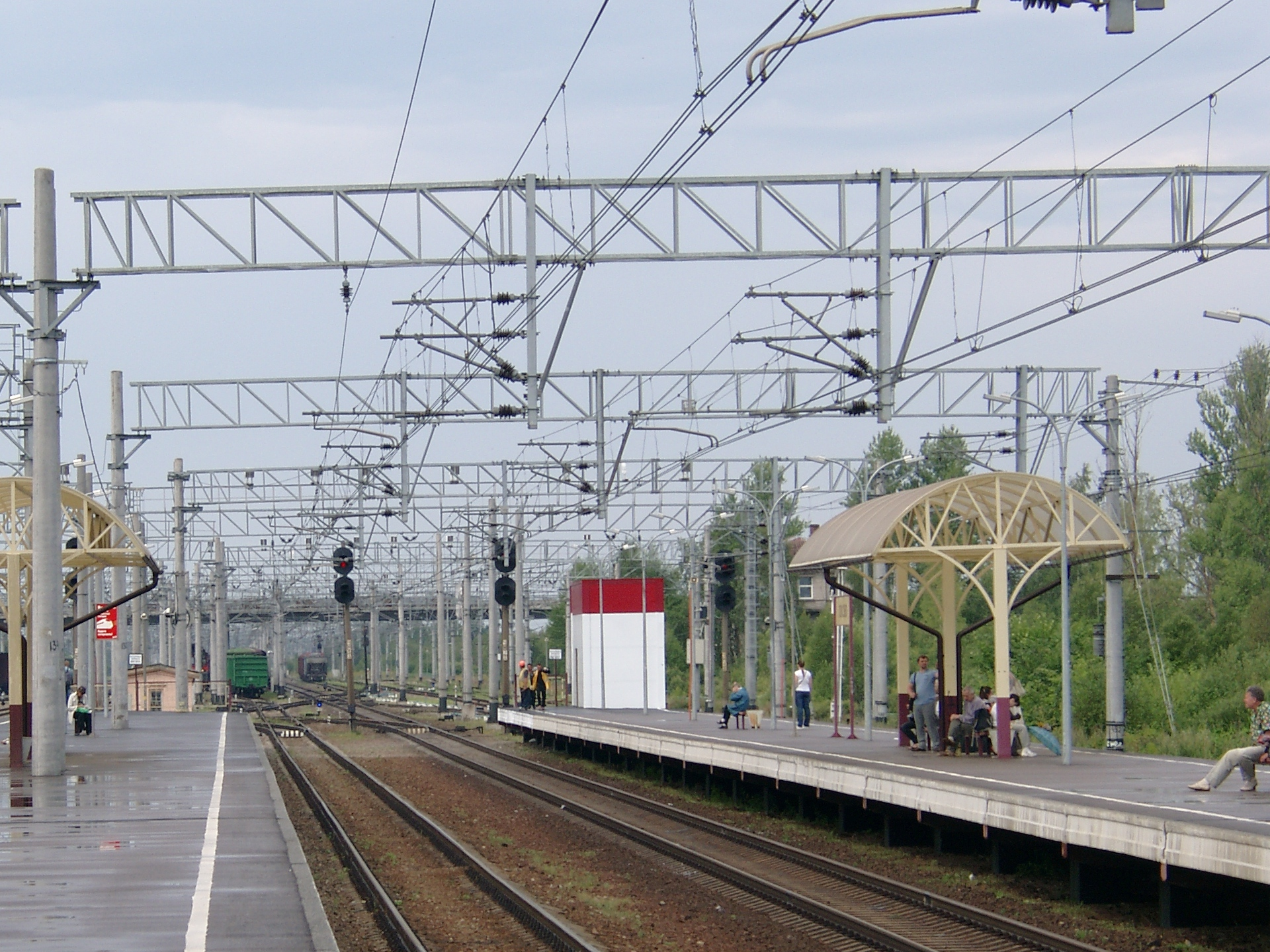
Tosno railway station

The M10 Highway connecting Moscow to St. Petersburg and the Moscow–St. Petersburg Railway run through the town. A railway connecting Tosno with the settlement of Shapki branches off east. A railway shortcut connects Tosno with the railway between Mga and Gatchina and is used for trains to bypass Saint Petersburg from the south.

Roads connect Tosno with Shapki and Mga in the east and with Lisino-Korpus and Vyritsa in the west.

== Culture and recreation ==
The town contains seven objects classified as cultural and historical heritage of local significance. They commemorate events of World War II.

Tosno hosts the Tosnensky District Museum, the only state museum in the district.

== Sport ==
FC Tosno, the 2018 Russian Cup winner, is based in the town.

== Notable people ==
- Pavel Alandsky, Russian historian and academic, born in Tosno
- Maria Stepanova, Russian basketball player, grew up in Tosno

== Twin towns and sister cities ==
Tosno is twinned with:

- Ballangen Municipality, Norway
