= Sablino railway station =

Railway station in Russia

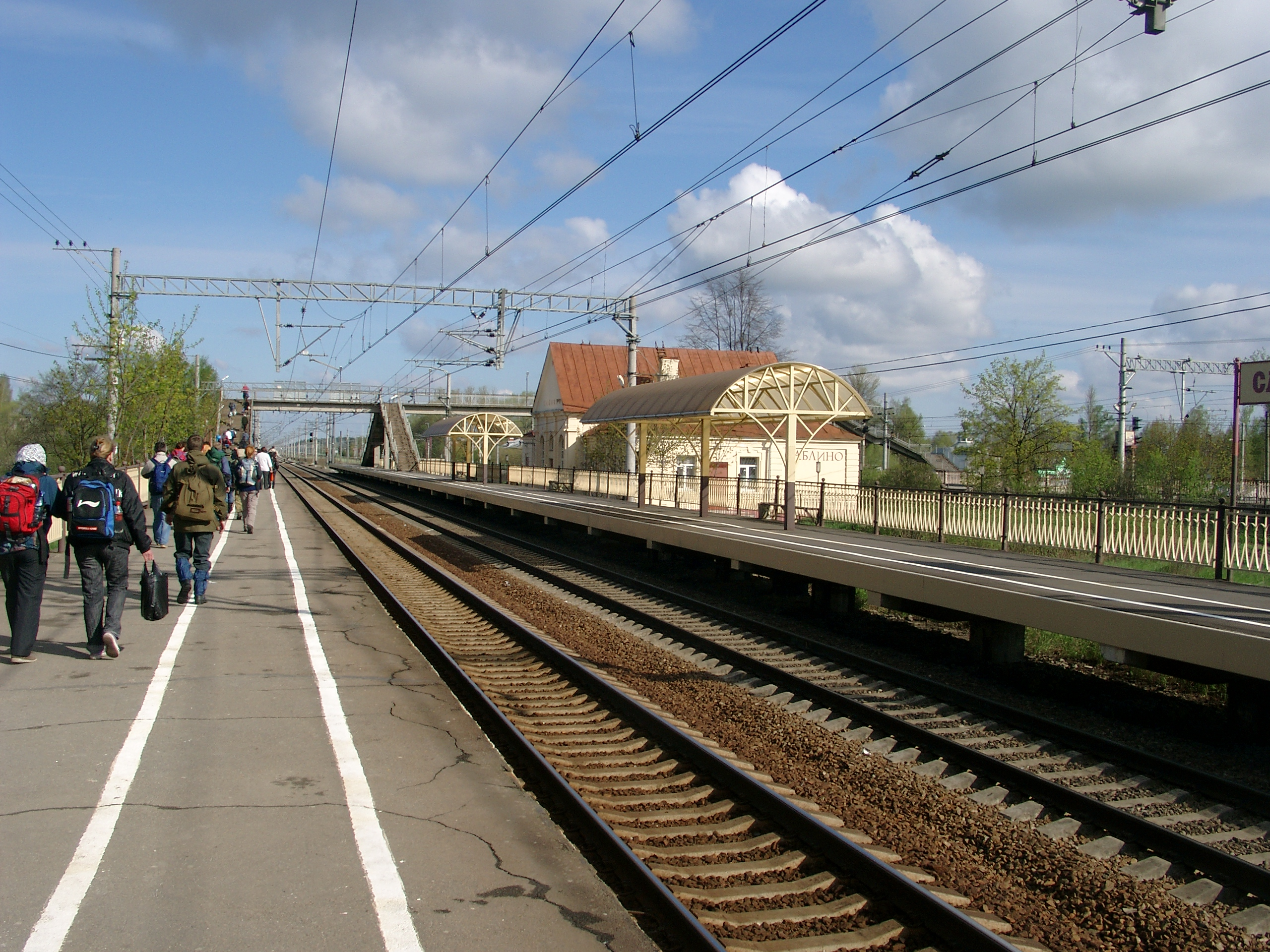
Sablino railway station

Sablino is a station on the railway connecting Saint Petersburg and Moscow, close to Saint Petersburg. It is located in the urban-type settlement of Ulyanovka.

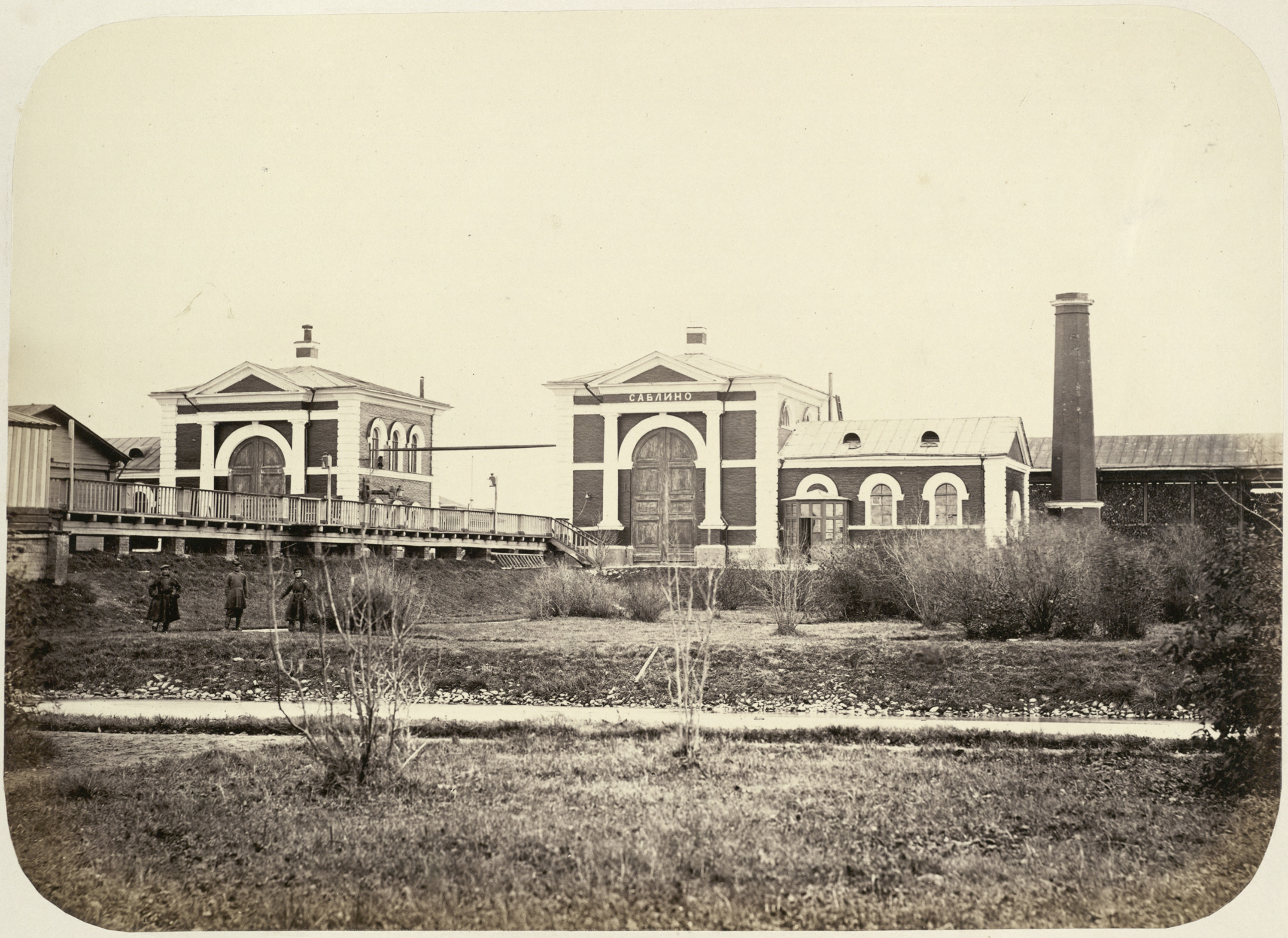
Sablino station at around 1860

== Station information ==
The station was opened in 1851 under the name Sablinskaya and under the St. Petersburg - Moscow Railway. In September 1855, the station became part of the Nikolaev Railway, and in 1863 renamed as Sablino station. In 1923, the station became part of the October Railway.
