= Tosnensky District =

Tosnensky District Тосненский район (Russian)
- District
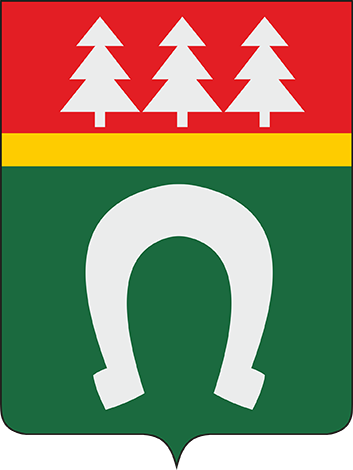
- Flag Coat of arms
- Location of TosnenskyDistrict in Leningrad Oblast
- Coordinates: 59°33′N 30°54′E
- Country: Russia
- Federal subject: Leningrad Oblast
- Established: August 19, 1930
- Administrative center: Tosno

Area
  - Total: 3,585.4 km^{2} (1,384.3 sq mi)

Population (2010 Census)
  - Total: 83,898
  - Density: 23.400/km^{2} (60.605/sq mi)
  - Urban: 59.3%
  - Rural: 40.7%

Administrative structure
  - Administrative divisions: 6 settlement municipal formation
  - Inhabited localities: 3 cities/towns, 4 urban-type settlements, 108 rural localities

Municipal structure
  - Municipally incorporated as: Tosnensky Municipal District
  - Municipal divisions: 7 urban settlements, 6 rural settlements
- Time zone: UTC+3 (MSK)
- OKTMO ID: 41648000
- Website: http://tosno-online.com/

Tosnensky District (Russian: То́сненский райо́н) is an administrative and municipal district (raion), one of the seventeen in Leningrad Oblast, Russia. It is located in the central southwestern part of the oblast and borders with Kirovsky District in the north, Kirishsky District in the east, Chudovsky District of Novgorod Oblast in the southeast, Novgorodsky District of Novgorod Oblast in the south, Luzhsky District in the southwest, Gatchinsky District in the west, and Pushkinsky and Kolpinsky Districts of the federal city of Saint Petersburg in the northwest. The area of the district is 3,585.4 square kilometers (1,384.3 sq mi). Its administrative center is the town of Tosno. Population (excluding the administrative center): 83,898 (2010 census); 77,194 (2002 Census); 78,500 (1989 Soviet census).

== Geography ==
The northern part of the district is heavily urbanized and consists essentially of suburbs of Saint Petersburg, whereas the southern part is swampy and hardly populated. The whole area of the district belongs to the drainage basin of the Neva River. The rivers in the north and in the west of the district drain into left tributaries of the Neva, of which the Tosna and the Izhora are the principal ones. The rivers in the south and in the east of the district drain into the Tigoda and the Kerest, left tributaries of the Volkhov River. The Tigoda crosses the southeastern part of the district, while a short stretch of the Kerest makes the boundary between the district and Novgorod Oblast.

== History ==
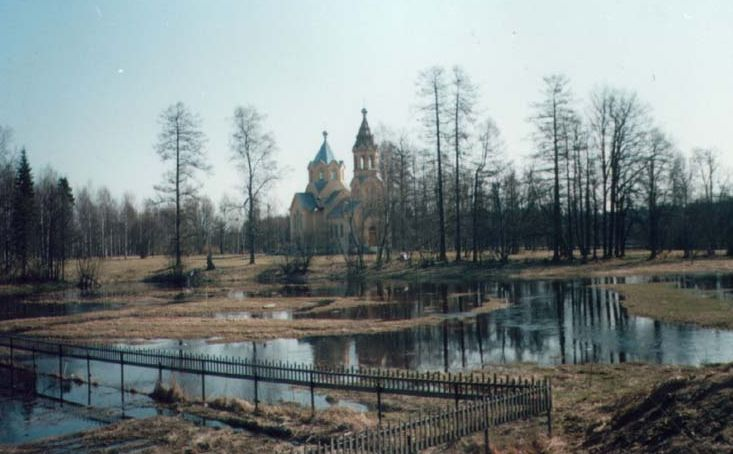
The Lustovka River with the Church of the Holy Cross in Lisino-Korpus in the background.

Originally, the area of the district was populated by Finnic peoples. From the 9th century, the area was changing hands between Novgorod Republic (from the 15th century, the Grand Duchy of Moscow), and Sweden. In 1617, according to the Treaty of Stolbovo, the area was transferred to Sweden, and in the 1700s, during the Great Northern War, it was conquered back by Russia. The city of Saint Petersburg was founded in 1703.

In the course of the administrative reform carried out in 1708 by Peter the Great, the area was included into Ingermanland Governorate (known since 1710 as Saint Petersburg Governorate). In 1727, Novgorod Governorate split off. The eastern part of the area was a part of Novgorodsky Uyezd of Novgorod Governorate. The western part remained in Saint Petersburg Governorate and later was split between Tsarskoselsky and Sankt-Peterburgsky Uyezds (renamed in 1913 Petrogradsky Uyezd and in 1924 Leningradsky Uyezd; the governorate was accordingly renamed Petrogradsky in 1913 and Leningradsky in 1924). On November 20, 1918 Tsarskoye Selo was renamed Detskoye Selo, and the uyezd was renamed Detskoselsky. On February 14, 1923 Detskoselsky and Petergofsky Uyezds were abolished and merged into Gatchinsky Uyezd, with the administrative center located in Gatchina.

On August 1, 1927, the uyezds were abolished and Lyubansky District, with the administrative center in the town of Lyuban, was established. The governorates were also abolished, and the district was a part of Leningrad Okrug of Leningrad Oblast. It included parts of former Novgorodsky Uyezds. On July 23, 1930, the okrugs were abolished as well, and the districts were directly subordinated to the oblast. On August 19, 1930 Lyubansky District was abolished, and Tosnensky District with the administrative district in Tosno was established on the areas occupied by Lubansky District and parts of Detskoselsky and Kolpinsky Districts. On August 20, 1935 Tosno and Krasny Bor were granted urban-type settlement status. Between September 1941 and January 1944, during World War II, the district was occupied by German troops. On December 9, 1960 parts of abolished Mginsky District were transferred to Tosnensky District, and in 1977, they were split off to form Kirovsky District. On February 1, 1963 Tosno was granted town status.

On August 1, 1927 Detskoselsky District was established as well, with the administrative center in the town of Detskoye Selo. It was a part of Leningrad Okrug of Leningrad Oblast and included areas formerly belonging to Gatchinsky and Novgorodsky Uyezds. The town of Slutsk was also a part of the district. On August 19, 1930 the district was abolished and split between Tosnensky, Krasnogvardeysky, and Leningradsky Prigorodny Districts.

Another district established on August 1, 1927 was Kolpinsky District, with the administrative center in the town of Kolpino. It was a part of Leningrad Okrug of Leningrad Oblast and included areas formerly belonging to Leningradsky and Gatchinsky Uyezds. On August 19, 1930 the district was abolished and split between Tosnensky and Leningradsky Prigorodny Districts.

On August 19, 1936 Slutsky District was established. It included some aread from abolished Leningradsky Prigorodny District and from Tosnensky District. On June 23, 1939 parts of Krasnogvardeysky District were transferred to Slutsky District. Between September 1941 and January 1944 parts of the district were occupied by German troops. On April 23, 1944 Slutsk was renamed Pavlovsk, and the district was renamed Pavlovsky. On July 25, 1953 Pavlovsky District was abolished and split between the city of Leningrad, Gatchinsky, and Tosnensky Districts.

== Economy ==
=== Industry ===
The economy of the district is based on construction industry, machine building industry, timber industry and peat extraction. In particular, the enterprises located in the district in 2011 produced 10% of the total amount of ceramic tiles in Russia.

=== Agriculture ===
The main agricultural specializations in the district are meat and milk production, as well as growing of vegetables, mainly potatoes. As of 2011, Tosnensky District produced 70% of all pork produced in Leningrad Oblast.

=== Transportation ===
Two railway lines, connecting Saint Peterburg with Moscow and Veliky Novgorod, respectively, cross the district from north to south. Ulyanovka (Sablino railway station), Tosno, and Lyuban are the main railway stations within the district. Sablino serves furthermore as a railway node and is connected by railways with Mga and Gatchina. Gladkoye narrow gauge railway and Pelgorskoye peat narrow gauge railway for hauling peat operate in the district.

The M10 highway, connecting Saint Petersburg in Moscow, crosses the district from north to south, mostly running parallel to the railway. The A120 highway, encircling Saint Petersburg, crosses the northern part of the district. There are also local roads, which in particular form a dense network in the northern part of the district, in the suburbs of Saint Petersburg. This infrastructure makes Tosnensky District one of the most developed districts in Russia.

== Culture and recreation ==
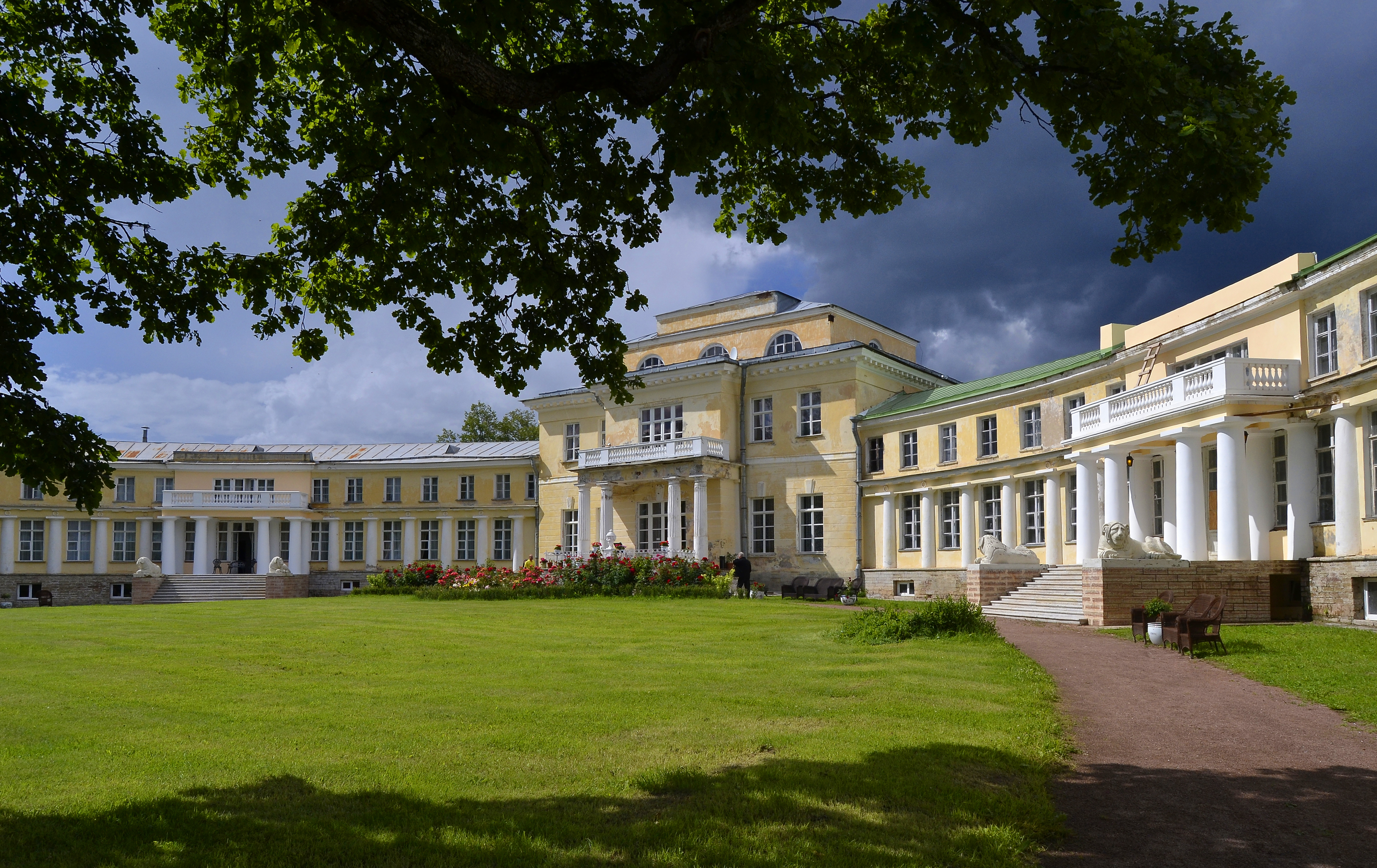
The Maryino Estate

The district contains twenty-two cultural heritage monuments of federal significance and additionally eighty-one objects classified as cultural and historical heritage of local significance. The federal monuments include the Maryino Estate of the Stroganovs, currently in the village of Andrianovo, and the ensemble of the Forest School in the settlement of Lisino-Korpus.

The only state museum in the district is the Tosnensky District Museum, located in the town of Tosno.
