= Vladimir Tishura =

Russian firefighter (1959–1986)

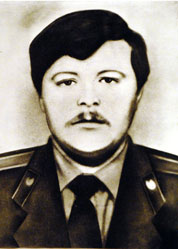
- Born: Vladimir Ivanovich Tishura; Владимир Иванович Тишура; December 15, 1959; Siversky, Leningrad Oblast, Russian SFSR, Soviet Union
- Died: May 10, 1986 (aged 26); Moscow, Russian SFSR, Soviet Union
- Resting place: Mitinskoe Cemetery, Moscow

Vladimir Ivanovich Tishura (Russian: Владимир Иванович Тишура; Ukrainian: Володимир Іванович Тишура; 15 December 1959, Siversky, Gatchinsky District, Leningrad Oblast — 10 May 1986, Moscow) was a liquidator for cleaning up the Chernobyl disaster, senior firefighter of the sixth independent militarized fire department for the protection of the city of Pripyat, and Hero of Ukraine (2006, posthumously).

== Biography ==
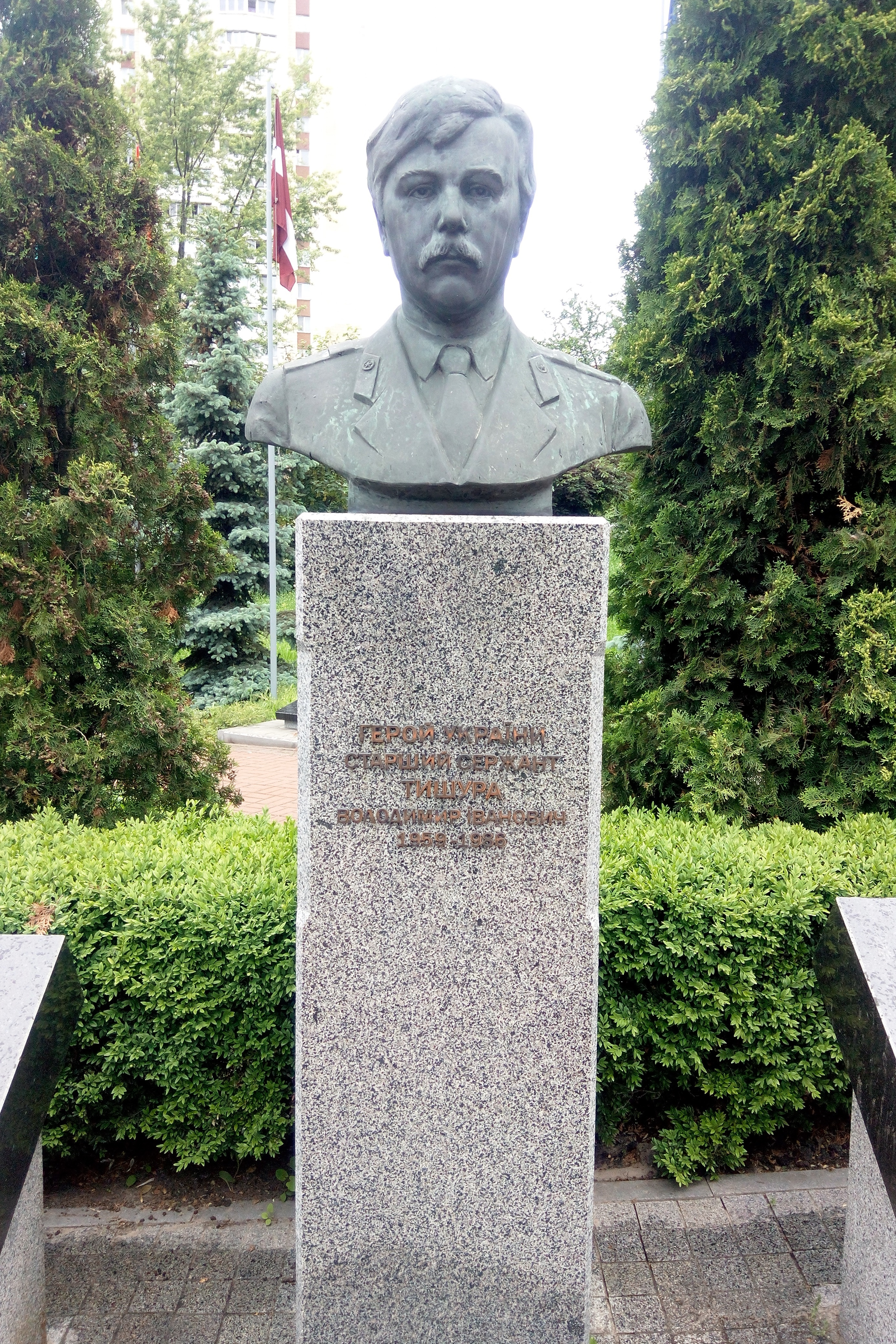
A bust of Vladimir Tishura on the Alley of "Heroes of Chernobyl" in Kyiv

Tishura died of acute radiation sickness in the 6th Clinical Hospital (Moscow) on May 10, 1986. He is buried at Mitinskoe Cemetery in Moscow.

== Awards ==
- Posthumously awarded the Order of the Red Banner.
