= Oredezh =

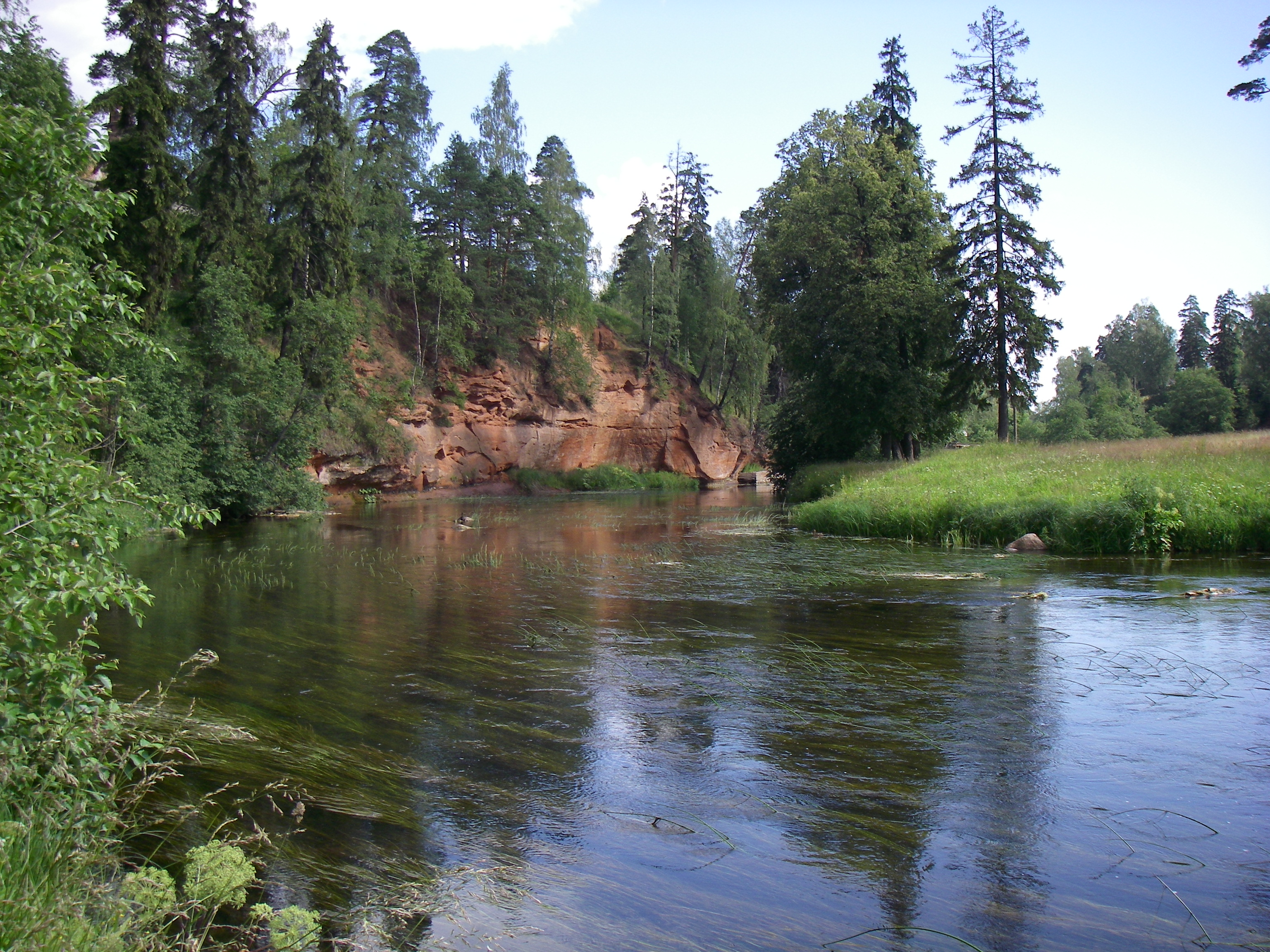
- On the Oredezh near the Siverskaya station
- Native name: Оредеж (Russian)

Location
- Country: Russia

Physical characteristics
- Mouth: Luga
  - coordinates: 58°48′42″N 29°58′22″E
- Length: 192 km (119 mi)
- Basin size: 3,220 km^{2} (1,240 sq mi)
- Discharge
  - average: 20 m^{3}/s (710 cu ft/s)

Basin features
- Progression: Luga→ Gulf of Finland

The Oredezh (Russian: О́редеж) is a river in Volosovsky, Gatchinsky, and Luzhsky Districts in the south-western part of Leningrad Oblast, Russia, a right tributary of the Luga. The length of the river is 192 kilometres (119 mi), whereas the area of its drainage basin is 3,220 square kilometres (1,240 mi^{2}). The principal tributary of the Oredezh is the Suyda (left). A cascade of hydroelectric plants was constructed on the upper course of the river in 1948.

The source of the Oredezh is located in Lake Kyurlevsky Karyer in the eastern part of Volosovsky District. The river flows south and crosses into Gatchinsky District. Upstream of the settlement of Batovo it turns east and flows through the urban-type settlements Siversky and Vyritsa. At the eastern edge of Vyritsa it sharply turns to the south and accepts the Suyda from the left. It further crosses into Luzhsky District and by the selo of Milodezh turns west. The mouth of the Oredezh is at the selo of Ploskoye.

The drainage basin of the Oredezh includes the southern part of Gatchinsky District and the eastern part of Luzhsky District, as well as minor areas in the east of Volosovsky District and in the southwest of Tosnensky District. Urban-type settlements of Siversky, Vyritsa, and Druzhnaya Gorka lie in the basin of the Oredezh. A part of Mshinskoye Boloto Zakaznik lies in the basin of the Oredezh, west of the river course.
