= Yashchera =

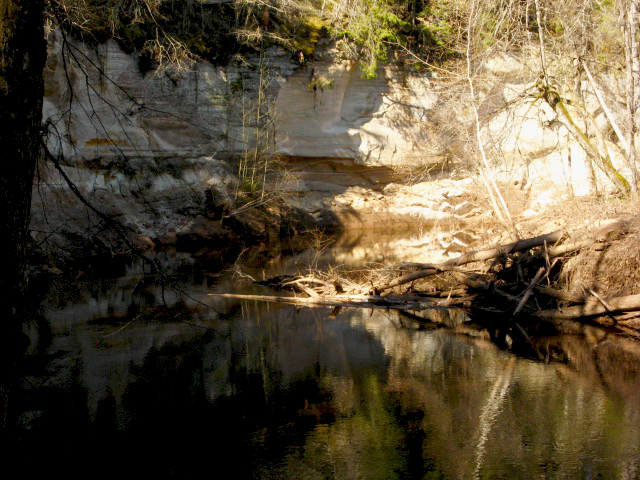

Location
- Country: Russia

Physical characteristics
- Mouth: Luga
  - coordinates: 58°53′00″N 29°48′52″E
- Length: 78 km (48 mi)
- Basin size: 655 km^{2} (253 mi^{2})

Basin features
- Progression: Luga→ Gulf of Finland

The Yashchera (Russian: Ящера) is a river in Luzhsky District of Leningrad Oblast, Russia, a right tributary of the Luga. The length of the Yashchera is 78 kilometres (48 mi), and the area of its drainage basin is 655 square kilometres (253 mi^{2}). The tributaries are the Lyubanka and the Lutinka (left), the Dolgusha and the Vladychkinskaya (Kamenka) (right).

The source of the Yashchera is in the northwest of Luzhsky District, west of the railway station of Divenskaya. The river flows south, turns east, then turns south again and subsequently southwest. The mouth of the Yashera is 177 kilometres (110 mi) upstream the Luga, northwest of the urban-type settlement of Tolmachyovo. The Yashchera mostly flows over deserted and swampy areas.

The drainage basin of the Yashchera includes areas in the north of Luzhsky District and in the south of Gatchinsky District of Leningrad Oblast. In particular, it includes the system of Lake Vyalye and Lake Strechno, the biggest lakes in the area. A part of Mshinskoye Boloto Zakaznik lies in the basin of the Yashchera, east of the river course.
