= Gatchinsky =

Gatchinsky (masculine), Gatchinskaya (feminine), or Gatchinskoye (neuter) may refer to:

- Gatchinsky District, a district of Leningrad Oblast, Russia
- Gatchinskoye Urban Settlement, a municipal formation corresponding to Gatchinskoye Settlement Municipal Formation, an administrative division of Gatchinsky District of Leningrad Oblast, Russia
