= Druzhnaya Gorka, Leningrad Oblast =

Druzhnaya Gorka Дружная Горка
- Urban-type settlement
- Interactive map of Druzhnaya Gorka
- Location of Druzhnaya Gorka Druzhnaya Gorka (Leningrad Oblast)
- Coordinates: 59°17′0″N 30°07′30″E
- Country: Russia
- Federal subject: Leningrad Oblast
- Administrative district: Gatchinsky District
- Established: 1801
- Urban-type settlement status since: 1927

Population (2010 Census)
  - Total: 3,463
  - Estimate (2024): 3,325 (−4%)

Municipal status
  - Municipal district: Gatchinsky Municipal District
  - Urban settlement: Druzhnogorskoye Urban Settlement
  - Capital of: Druzhnogorskoye Urban Settlement
- Time zone: UTC+3 (MSK)
- Postal code: 188377
- OKTMO ID: 41618156051
- Website: www.drgp.ru

Druzhnaya Gorka (Russian: Дру́жная Го́рка) is an urban locality (an urban-type settlement) in Gatchinsky District of Leningrad Oblast, Russia, located on the banks of the Orlinka River, south of the town of Gatchina. Population: 3,463 (2010 census); 3,696 (2002 census); 4,208 (1989 Soviet census).

== History ==
Druzhnaya Gorka was founded in 1801 as a settlement serving the glass-making factory. It belonged to Tsarskoselsky Uyezd of Saint Petersburg Governorate (renamed in 1913 Petrograd Governorate and in 1924 Leningrad Governorate). On November 20, 1918 the uyezd was renamed Detskoselsky. On February 14, 1923 Detskoselsky and Petergofsky Uyezds were abolished and merged into Gatchinsky Uyezd, with the administrative center located in Gatchina. On February 14, 1923 Gatchina was renamed Trotsk, and Gatchinsky Uyezd was renamed Trotsky Uyezd, after Leon Trotsky. On May 16, 1927 Druzhnaya Gorka was granted work settlement status.

On August 1, 1927, the uyezds were abolished and Trotsky District, with the administrative center in the town of Trotsk, was established. The governorates were also abolished, and the district was a part of Leningrad Okrug of Leningrad Oblast. Druzhnaya Gorka was made a part of Trotsky District. On August 2, 1929, after Trotsky was deported from Soviet Union, Trotsk was renamed Krasnogvardeysk, and the district was renamed Krasnogvardeysky. On July 23, 1930, the okrugs were abolished as well, and the districts were directly subordinated to the oblast. Between August 1941 and January 1944 Druzhnaya Gorka was occupied by German troops. On January 28, 1944, Krasnogvardeysk was renamed Gatchina, and the district was renamed Gatchinsky.

== Economy ==
=== Industry ===
The main industrial enterprise in Druzhnaya Gorka is a factory producing glass laboratory equipment. This is a successor of a glass-making factory founded in 1801 and being continuously in operation since then.

=== Transportation ===
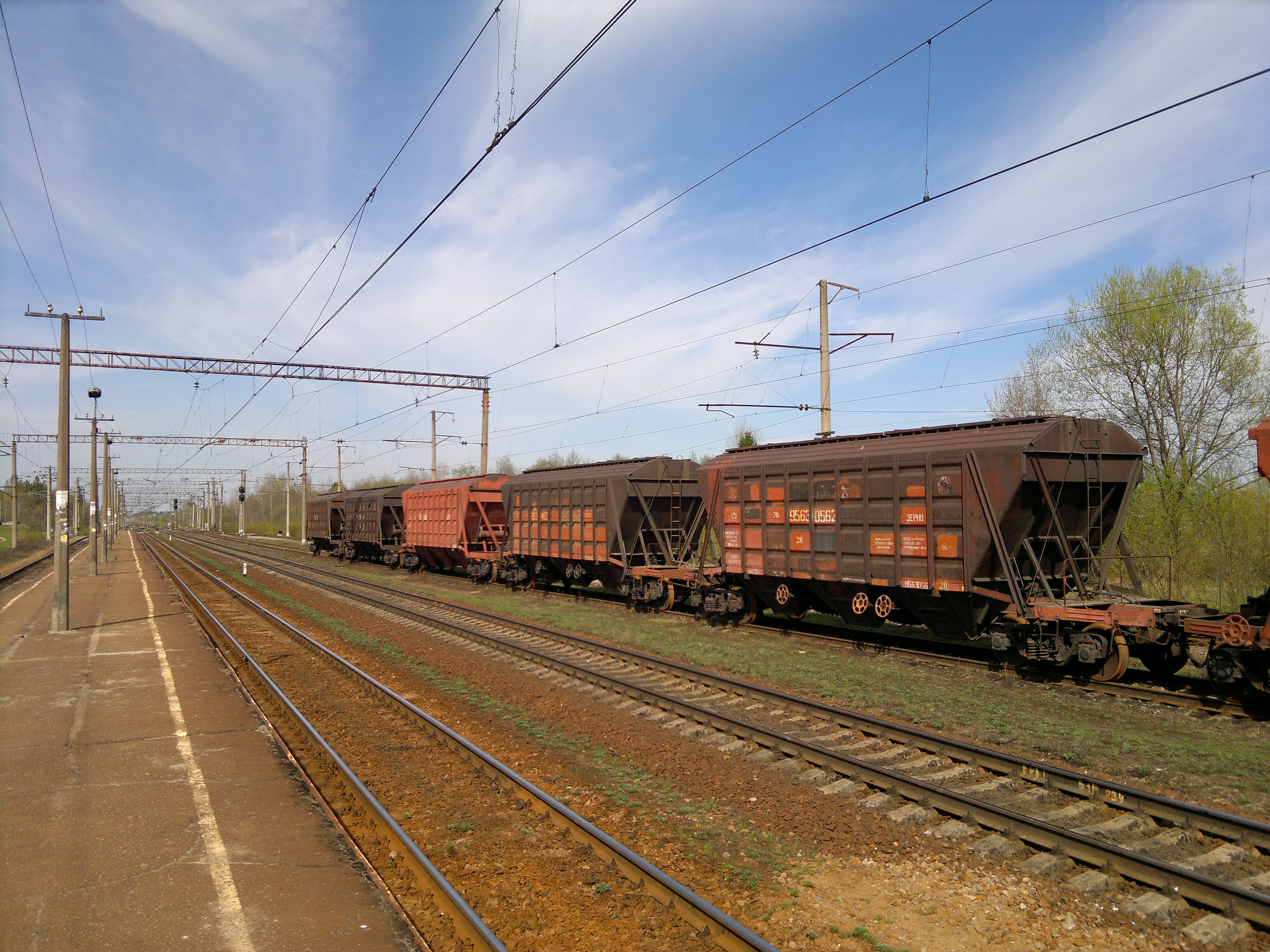
Stroganovo railway station.

The closest railway station to the settlement is Stroganovo, which is located several kilometers west of Druzhnaya Gorka but is a part of Druzhnogorskoye Urban Settlement. There is suburban service to the Baltiysky railway station of Saint Petersburg, Gatchina, and Luga.

Druzhnaya Gorka has access to the M20 highway connecting Saint Petersburg and Pskov. There are also local roads.

== Culture and recreation ==
Druzhnaya Gorka contains four objects classified as cultural and historical heritage of local significance. These are the administration building of the glass-making factory, a house where the factory worker, Mikhail Utkin, was living in the beginning in the 20th century, and two mass graves of soldiers fallen during World War II. Next to Druzhnaya Gorka, in the selo of Orlino, the Transfiguration Church from 1809 and the park of the former estate survived.
