= Luzhsky District =

Luzhsky District Лужский район (Russian)
- District
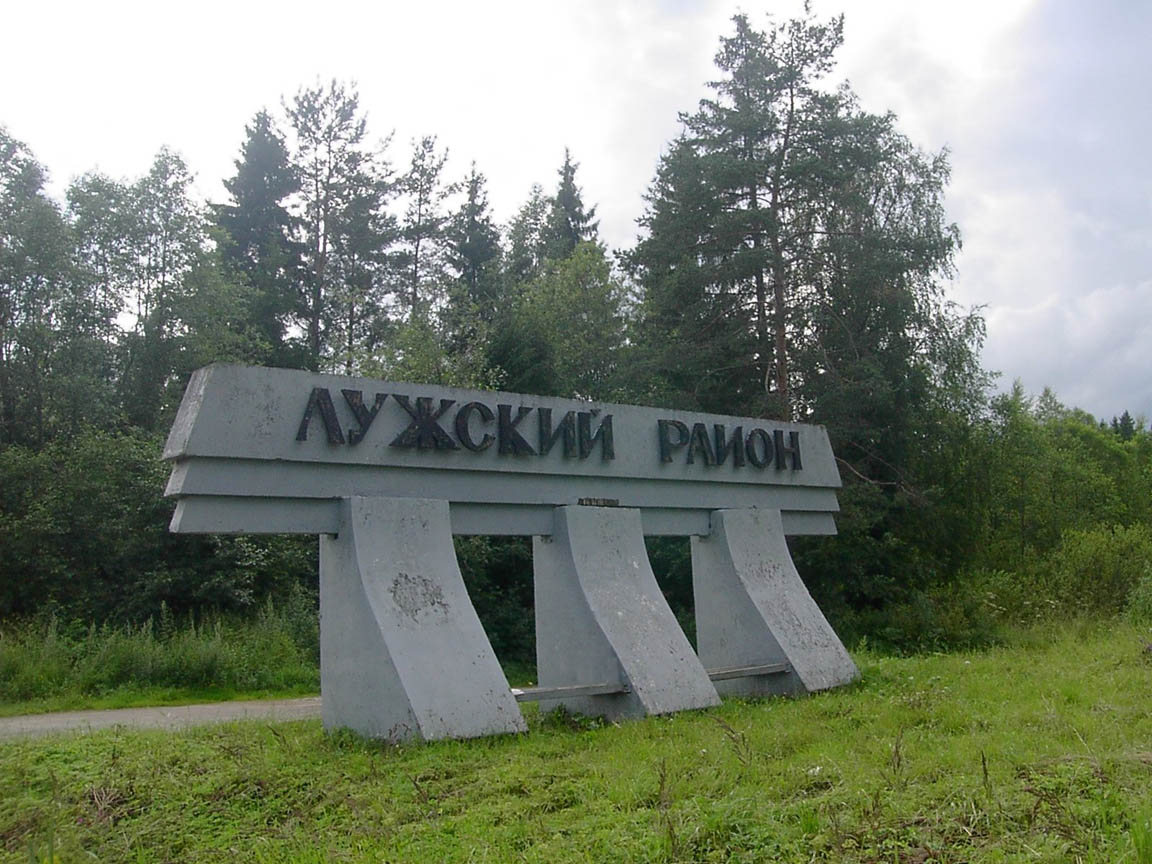
- Welcome sign at the entrance to Luzhsky District

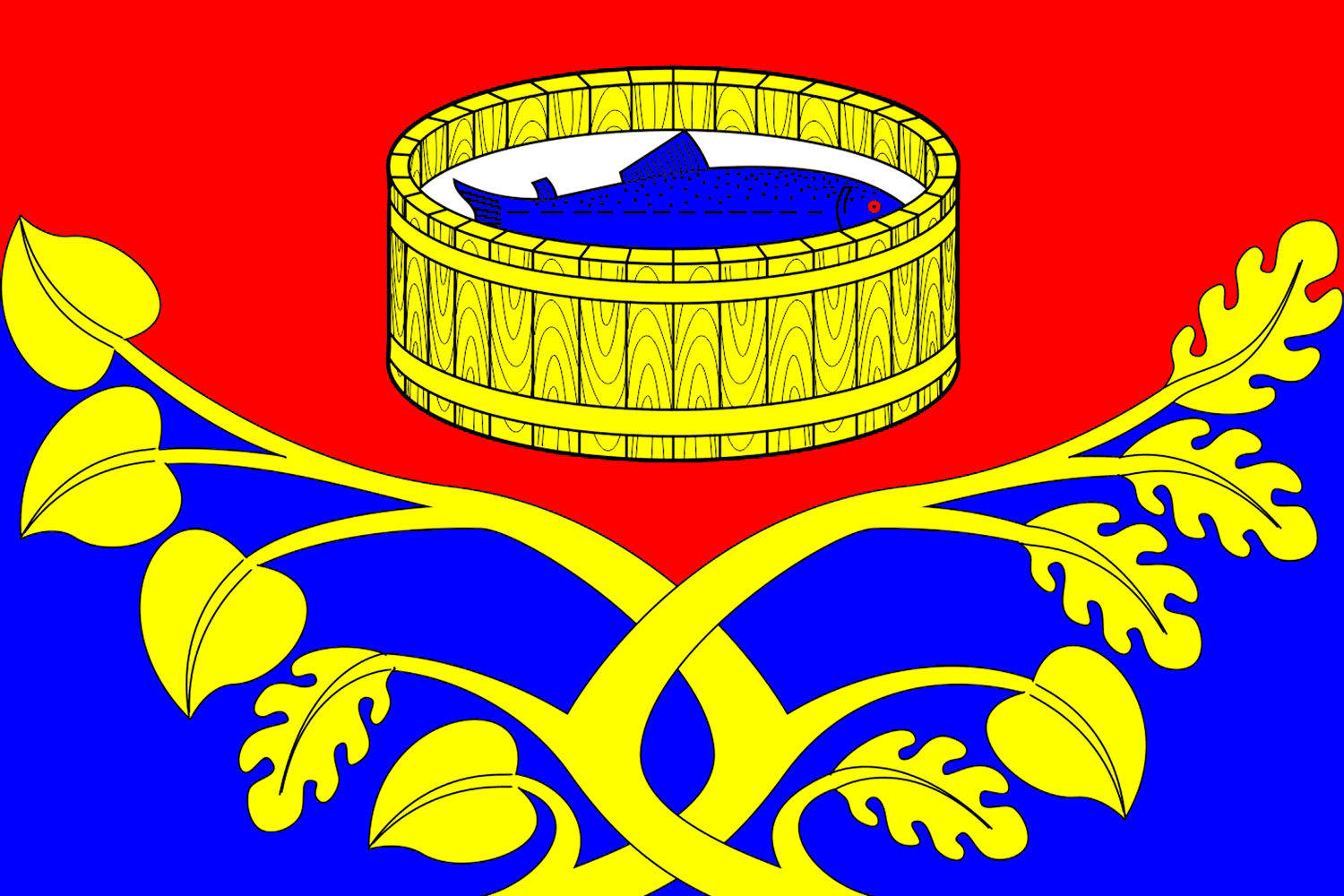
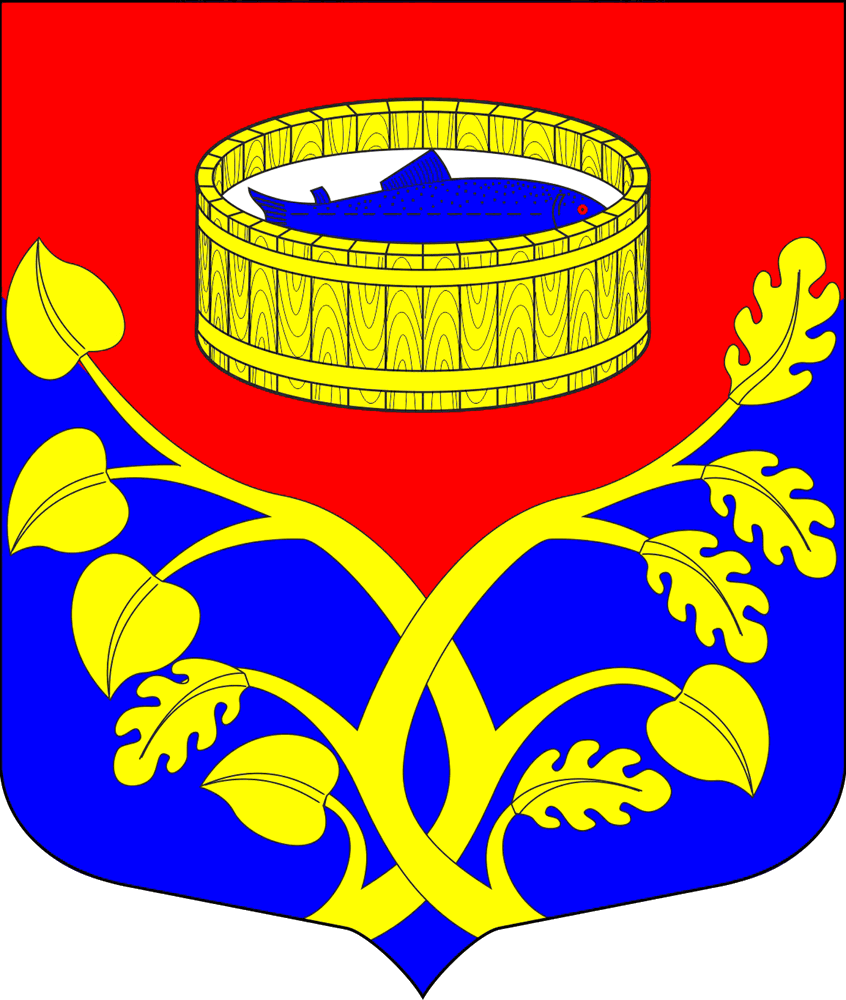
- Flag Coat of arms
- Location of Luzhsky District in Leningrad Oblast
- Coordinates: 58°44′N 29°51′E
- Country: Russia
- Federal subject: Leningrad Oblast
- Established: 1 August 1927
- Administrative center: Luga

Area
  - Total: 6,006.44 km^{2} (2,319.10 sq mi)

Population (2010 Census)
  - Total: 40,166
  - Density: 6.6872/km^{2} (17.320/sq mi)
  - Urban: 8.0%
  - Rural: 92.0%

Administrative structure
  - Administrative divisions: 13 settlement municipal formation
  - Inhabited localities: 1 cities/towns, 1 urban-type settlements, 346 rural localities

Municipal structure
  - Municipally incorporated as: Luzhsky Municipal District
  - Municipal divisions: 2 urban settlements, 13 rural settlements
- Time zone: UTC+3 (MSK)
- OKTMO ID: 41633000
- Website: luga.ru

Luzhsky District (Russian: Лу́жский райо́н) is an administrative and municipal district (raion), one of the seventeen in Leningrad Oblast, Russia. It is located in the southwest of the oblast and borders with Gatchinsky District in the north, Tosnensky District in the northeast, Novgorodsky and Batetsky Districts of Novgorod Oblast in the southeast, Shimsky District, also of Novgorod Oblast, in the south, Plyussky District of Pskov Oblast in the southwest, Slantsevsky District in the west, and Volosovsky District in the northwest. The area of the district is 6,006.44 square kilometers (2,319.10 sq mi). Its administrative center is the town of Luga. Population (excluding the administrative center): 40,166 (2010 census); 41,885 (2002 Census); 48,721 (1989 Soviet census).

== Geography ==
The area of the district is mostly flat with altitudes ranging from 0 to 100 meters (0 to 328 ft) above sea level. Almost the whole area of the district belongs to the basin of the Luga River, a tributary of the Gulf of Finland. The main tributaries of the Luga within the district are the Oredezh (right), the Saba (left), and the Yashchera (right). Some areas in the south and the southwest of the district belong to the river basin of the Plyussa River, a right tributary of the Narva, and rivers in the minor areas in the east of the district drain into the Tosna River, a left tributary of the Neva. There are many lakes in the district, the most significant of them being Lakes Vyale, Vrevo, and Cheremenetskoye.

In the northeast of the district, the Mshinskoye Boloto Zakaznik was created to protect the swamp landscape with the pine-tree forest. The zakaznik is shared with Gatchinsky District.

== History ==
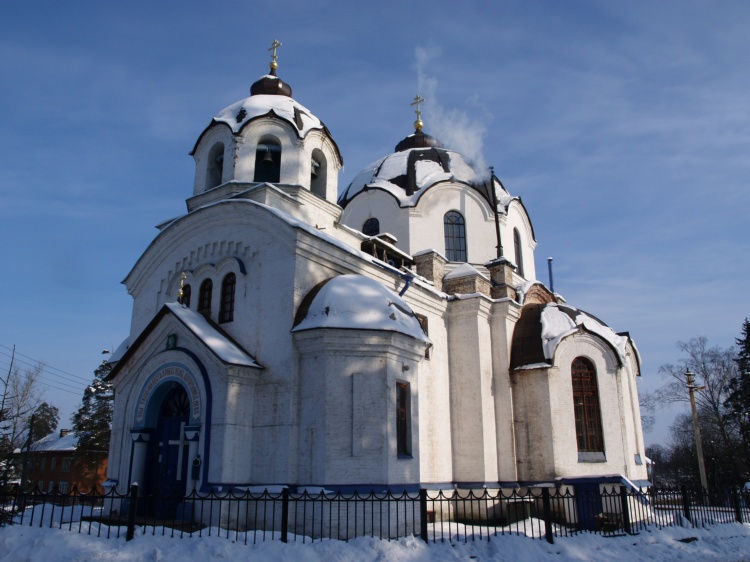
The Kazan Cathedral in Luga

Originally, the area of the district was populated by Finnic peoples, in particular, the Votes. From the 8th century, the Slavs began arriving. The Luga River was first mentioned in chronicles under 947. In the following, the area was dependent on the Novgorod Republic (from the 15th century, the Grand Duchy of Moscow). It was desolated during the Livonian War but recovered. In 1617, according to the Treaty of Stolbovo, the north of the area was transferred to Sweden, the border was drawn at the Oredezh and Luga Rivers. and in the 1700s, during the Great Northern War, it was conquered back by Russia. The city of Saint Petersburg was founded in 1703.

In the course of the administrative reform carried out in 1708 by Peter the Great, the area was included into Ingermanland Governorate (known since 1710 as Saint Petersburg Governorate). In 1727, Novgorod Governorate split off. The eastern part of the area was a part of Novgorodsky Uyezd of Novgorod Governorate. In 1772, the western part of the area was transferred to the newly established Pskov Governorate, which in 1777 was transformed to Pskov Viceroyalty. Luga was founded in 1777, and until 1782 belonged to Pskov Viceroyalty. In 1782, it became the administrative center of Luzhsky Uyezd of Saint Petersburg Governorate (renamed Petrogradsky in 1913 and Leningradsky in 1924). In 1918, important events of the Russian Civil War took place in the area, when the White Army unsuccessfully tried to conquer Petrograd.

On August 1, 1927, the uyezds were abolished and Luzhsky District, with the administrative center in the town of Luga, was established. The governorates were also abolished, and the district was a part of Luga Okrug of Leningrad Oblast. It included parts of former Luzhsky and Gatchinsky Uyezds. On July 23, 1930, the okrugs were abolished as well, and the districts were directly subordinated to the oblast. On January 1, 1932 parts of Plyussky District which was abolished were transferred to Luzhsky District; consequently, minor parts of Luzhsky District were transferred to Lyadsky and Krasnogvardeysky Districts. On February 15, 1935 Plyussky District was re-established, and most of the areas were transferred back to this district. On September 19, 1939 Luga was made town of oblast significance and was not anymore a part of the district. Between August 1941 and February 1944, during World War II, the district was occupied by German troops. In 2010, the administrative division of Leningrad Oblast was harmonized with the municipal division, and Gatchina was made the town of district significance.

On August 1, 1927, Oredezhsky District, with the administrative center in the settlement of Oredezh, was established as well. It was a part of Luga Okrug of Leningrad Oblast and included parts of former Trotsky and Luzhsky Uyezds, as well as of Novgorodsky Uyezd of Novgorod Governorate. Between August 1941 and February 1944 the area of the district was occupied by German troops. On October 22, 1959 Oredezhsky District was abolished and split between Luzhsky and Gatchinsky Districts.

On August 1, 1927 Osminsky District with the administrative center in the selo of Osmino was established as well. It was a part of Luga Okrug of Leningrad Oblast. It included areas which were previously parts of Gdovsky, Luzhsky, and Kingiseppsky Uyezds. On July 23, 1930, the okrugs were abolished, and the districts were directly subordinated to the oblast. Between March 22, 1935 and September 19, 1940, Osminsky District was a part of Kingisepp Okrug of Leningrad Oblast, one of the okrugs abutting the state boundaries of the Soviet Union. Between August 1941, and February 1944, Osminsky District was occupied by German troops. On August 2, 1961 Osminsky District was abolished and split between Slantsevsky and Volosovsky Districts. After the abortive administrative reform of the 1960s, its territory became split between Slantsevsky, Volosovsky, Luzhsky, and Kingiseppsky Districts.

== Economy ==
=== Industry ===
There are enterprises of construction, chemical, and food industries in the district.

=== Army training ===
The Russian Army has a free-fire training range in Luzhsky District. In mid-September 2017, during exercise Zapad (West) 2017 and fire-power demonstration for media and other civilians, a Ka-52 helicopter fired a missile that hit the ground near spectators in a parking area. Several people were wounded, and several cars damaged. President Vladimir Putin attended part of these manoeuvres.

=== Natural resources ===
There are deposits of glass sand and peat in the district.

=== Agriculture ===
The main agricultural specializations within the district are cattle breeding with milk and meat production, and potato growing.

=== Transportation ===
Two railway lines cross the district from north to south. The one lying to the east connects Saint Petersburg with Novosokolniki via Dno, with the principal station being Oredezh. There is suburban connection between the Vitebsky railway station of Saint Petersburg and Oredezh. Another one, lying to the west, connects the Baltiysky railway station of Saint Petersburg and Pskov, passing through Luga. In Luga, a railway line to Batetsky and Veliky Novgorod branches off east.

The M20 highway, connecting Saint Petersburg with Pskov and eventually with Kyiv crosses the district from northeast to southwest, passing Luga. In Luga, two more roads branch eastwards: One running to Veliky Novgorod, and another one to Lyuban and Mga, largely following the border of Leningrad Oblast.

== Culture and recreation ==
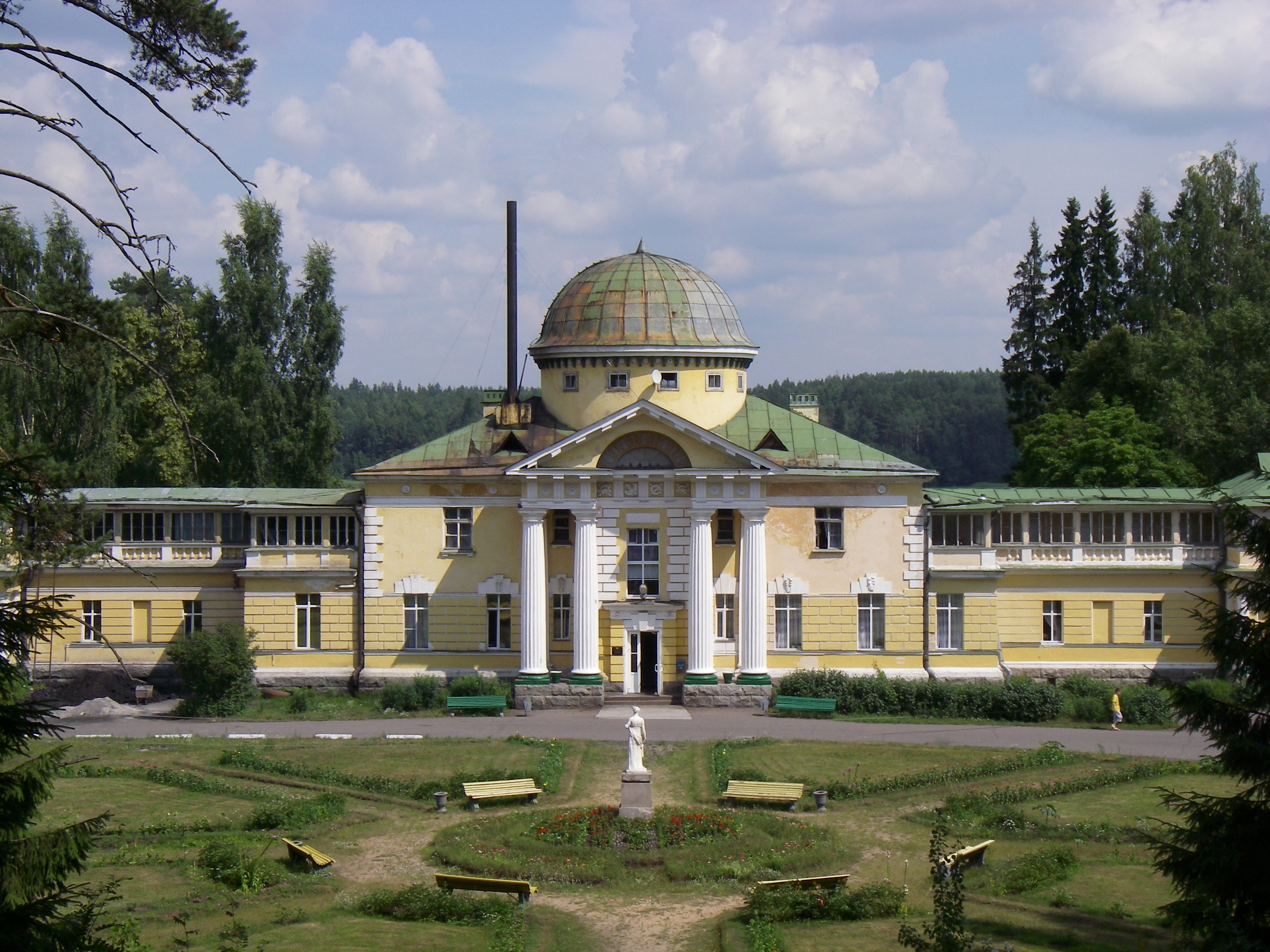
The former manor of Borovoye

The district contains three cultural heritage monuments of federal significance and additionally 191 objects classified as cultural and historical heritage of local significance (25 of them in the town of Luga). The federal monuments are the wooden Chapel of Saints Peter and Paul in the village of Zakhonye, the tomb of Dmitry Lyalin, and officer who participated in the Patriotic War of 1812, in his former estate in the village of Zaplotye, and a monument to fallen Soviet partisans.

The only state museum in the district is the Luzhsky District Museum, located in the town of Luga.
