= Tolmachyovo =

Tolmachyovo Толмачёво
- Urban-type settlement
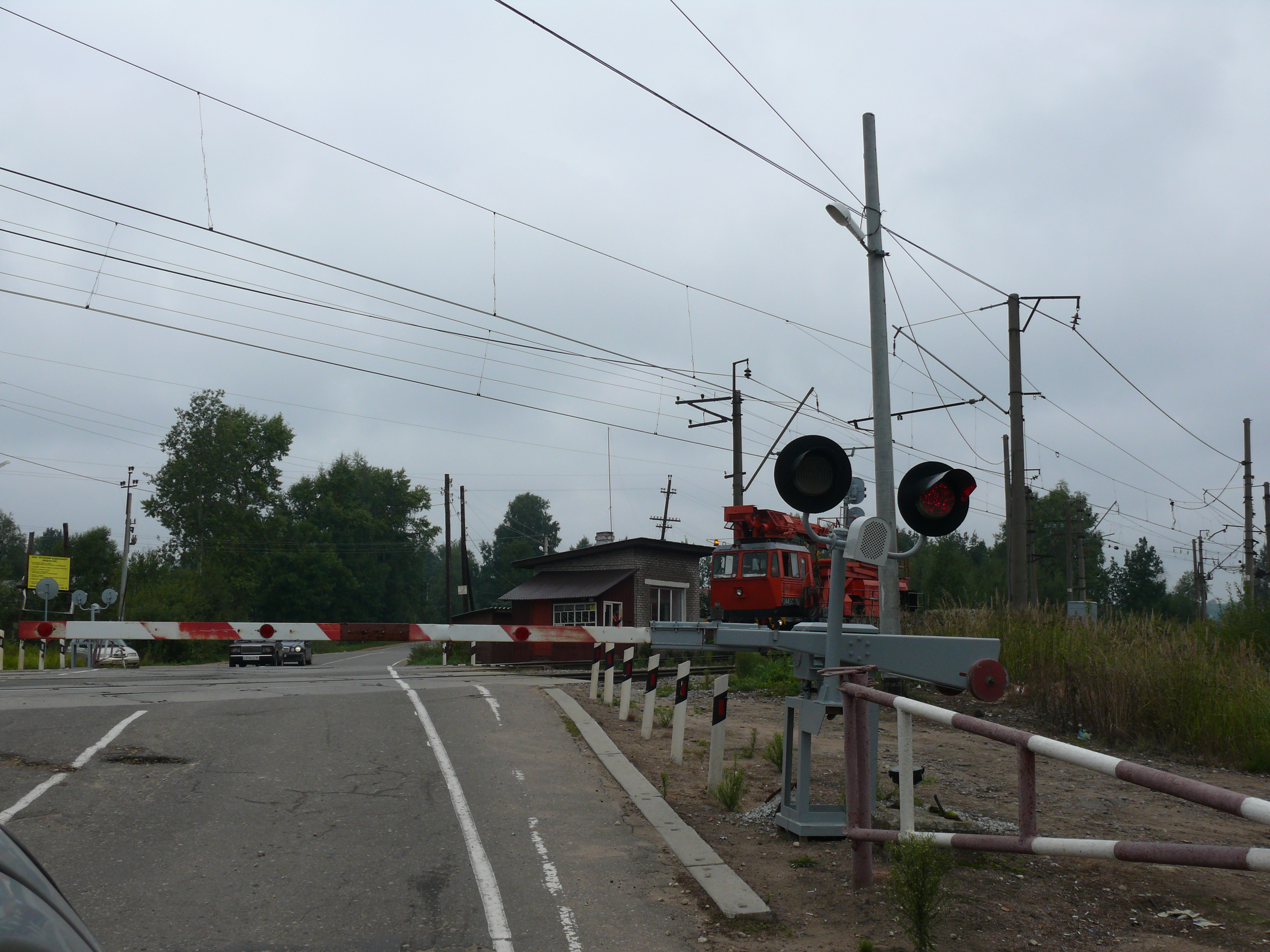
- Railway crossing in Tolmachyovo
- Interactive map of Tolmachyovo
- Location of Tolmachyovo Tolmachyovo (Leningrad Oblast)
- Coordinates: 58°51′N 29°55′E
- Country: Russia
- Federal subject: Leningrad Oblast
- Administrative district: Luzhsky District
- Settlement: 1858
- Urban-type settlement status since: 1938

Population (2010 Census)
  - Total: 3,232
  - Estimate (2024): 2,812 (−13%)

Municipal status
  - Municipal district: Luzhsky Municipal District
  - Urban settlement: Tolmachyovskoye Urban Settlement
  - Capital of: Tolmachyovskoye Urban Settlement
- Time zone: UTC+3 (MSK)
- Postal code: 188255
- OKTMO ID: 41633154051
- Website: gptolmachevo.ru

Tolmachyovo (Russian: Толмачёво) is an urban locality (an urban-type settlement) in Luzhsky District of Leningrad Oblast, Russia, located on the right bank of the Luga River, northeast of the town of Luga. Population: 3,232 (2010 census); 3,378 (2002 census); 3,948 (1989 Soviet census).

== History ==
The settlement was founded in 1858 and served the railway station of Preobrazhenskaya. The name is related to the Preobrazhensky Regiment which was stationed nearby. An early enterprise in the settlement was a sawmill. By the end of the 19th century, the settlement was also a popular summer house area. At the time, it belonged to Luzhsky Uyezd of Saint Petersburg Governorate (subsequently Petrograd Governorate and Leningrad Governorate). In 1919, the station and the settlement were renamed Tolmachyovo to commemorate Nikolay Tolmachyov, a bolshevik killed in the area during the Russian Civil War.

On August 1, 1927, the uyezds were abolished and Luzhsky District, with the administrative center in the town of Luga, was established. The governorates were also abolished, and the district was a part of Luga Okrug of Leningrad Oblast. On July 23, 1930, the okrugs were abolished as well, and the districts were directly subordinated to the oblast. On November 9, 1938 Tolmachyovo, which previously had the status of suburban settlement, was granted urban settlement status. Between 1941 and 1944, during World War II, Tolmachyovo was occupied by German troops.

== Economy ==
=== Industry ===
In Tolmachyovo, there is a plant of concrete constructions and another one producing compound feed.

=== Transportation ===
Tolmachyovo is located on the railway connecting Saint Petersburg and Pskov. There are two railway stations in the settlement, Tolmachyovo and Partizanskaya.

The M20 highway, connecting Saint Petersburg with Pskov and eventually with Kyiv, runs several kilometers east of Tolmachyovo. The settlement has an access to it. Tolmachyovo is also connected by road with Slantsy and Kingisepp.

== Culture and recreation ==
Tolmachyovo contains four objects classified as cultural and historical heritage of local significance. One is the remains of the Lidino Estate, and the other three are monuments to soldiers fallen during World War II.
