= Nikolay Tolmachyov =

Russian Bolshevik revolutionary

Nikolai Gurevich Tolmachyov
- Николай Гурьевич Толмачёв
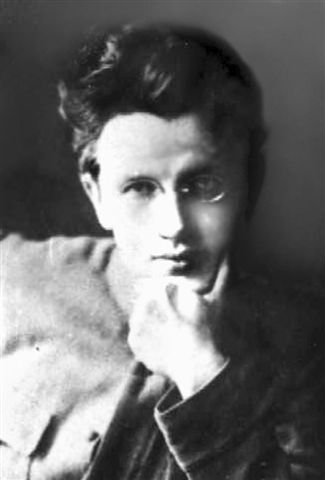
- Born: November 12, 1895; Ekaterinburg, Russian Empire
- Died: May 26, 1919 (aged 23); Krasnye Gory, Luzhsky Uyezd, Petrograd Governorate, Russian Socialist Federative Soviet Republic
- Burial place: Field of Mars
- Military career
- Allegiance: Russian Empire; Russian Soviet Federative Socialist Republic
- Service years: 1918–1919
- Nickname: Vasiliy
- Conflicts: Russian Civil War †

Nikolai Gurevich Tolmachyov (Russian: Никола́й Гу́рьевич Толмачёв; November 12 [O.S. October 31], 1895 – May 26, 1919) was a Russian Bolshevik revolutionary and participant of the February and October Revolutions, the Civil War. He was a political worker of the Red Army and one of the first military commissars.

== Biography ==
Born in 1895 in Yekaterinburg.

From 1912 he studied at the Saint Petersburg Polytechnic Institute. Member of the Russian Social Democratic Labor Party (Bolsheviks) since 1913. Participated in the revolutionary movement. For participation in the May Day demonstration in 1913 he was arrested. In 1914–15, he was a member of the Vyborg District Committee of the Russian Social-Democratic Labor Party, and edited the newspaper Proletarian Voice. In 1916, on the instructions of the Russian Bureau of the Central Committee of the Russian Social-Democratic Labor Party, he conducted party work in the Urals. Participant of the February Revolution of 1917 in Petrograd, member of the Petrograd Committee of the Russian Social-Democratic Labor Party. Being at the head of the rebel soldiers, he freed political prisoners from the Peter and Paul Fortress. Delegate of the 7th (April) Party Conference. From April 1917, again in the Urals, from October 1917 a member of the Perm Committee of the Russian Social-Democratic Labor Party (Bolsheviks), organized the workers' militia and the Red Guard units. After the October Revolution, Secretary of the Council of Workers' Deputies of the Vyborg District of Petrograd. One of the founders of the first legal newspaper of the Bolsheviks of Kama Region, the Proletarian Standard, a regular contributor to this newspaper.

In the Red Army since 1918. During the Civil War in 1918–1919, the commissar of the workers' detachment to combat Dutovism, a member of the Central Executive Committee of the Ural Regional Soviet and chief political commissar of the 3rd Army of the Eastern Front (from January to March 1919). One of the regicides of Nicholas II. Party and signatory to the decision to execute the royal family in July 1918. Delegate with a decisive vote at the 8th Congress of the Russian Communist Party (Bolsheviks) March 18–23, 1919. He commanded the Red Army detachment in the battles of Zlatoust, created regular units of the Soviet Army in the Urals. Together with representatives of the Ural Regional Committee of the Russian Communist Party (Bolsheviks), he was one of the organizers of the first political departments of the Soviet Army. Later, in the same year, he became the head of the cultural education department of the Petrograd district military commissariat. On his initiative, political workers' courses were created, on the basis of which the Red Army Teacher Training Institute was formed, later transformed into the Military–Political Academy. In May 1919, he was a member of the City Defense Committee, and was sent as the authorized to the 7th Army on the Lugov front sector against General Yudenich's troops.

In battle near Preobrazhenskaya station near the village of Krasnye Gory, he was seriously wounded, surrounded by the White Guards, and shot himself in order to not be captured and taken prisoner. He was buried on the Field of Mars in Saint Petersburg.

== Family ==
Spouse: Valentina Tolmachyova, brother: Georgy Gurevich Tolmachyov – a member of the Unions of the Socialist Working Youth of the Urals, authorized by the Ural Regional Council.

== Remembrance ==
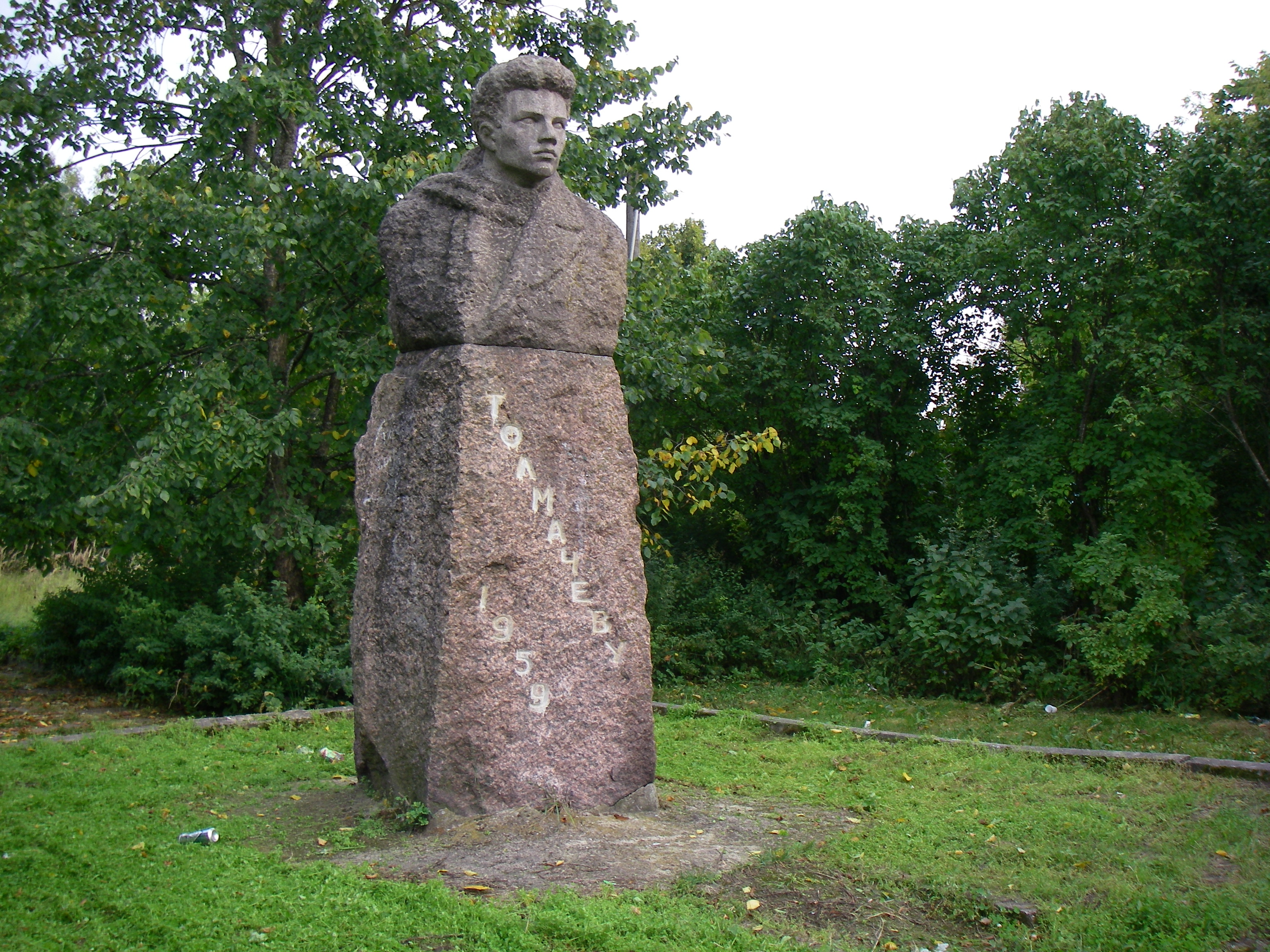
Monument to Nikolai Tolmachyov in the village of Tolmachevo, Leningrad Region

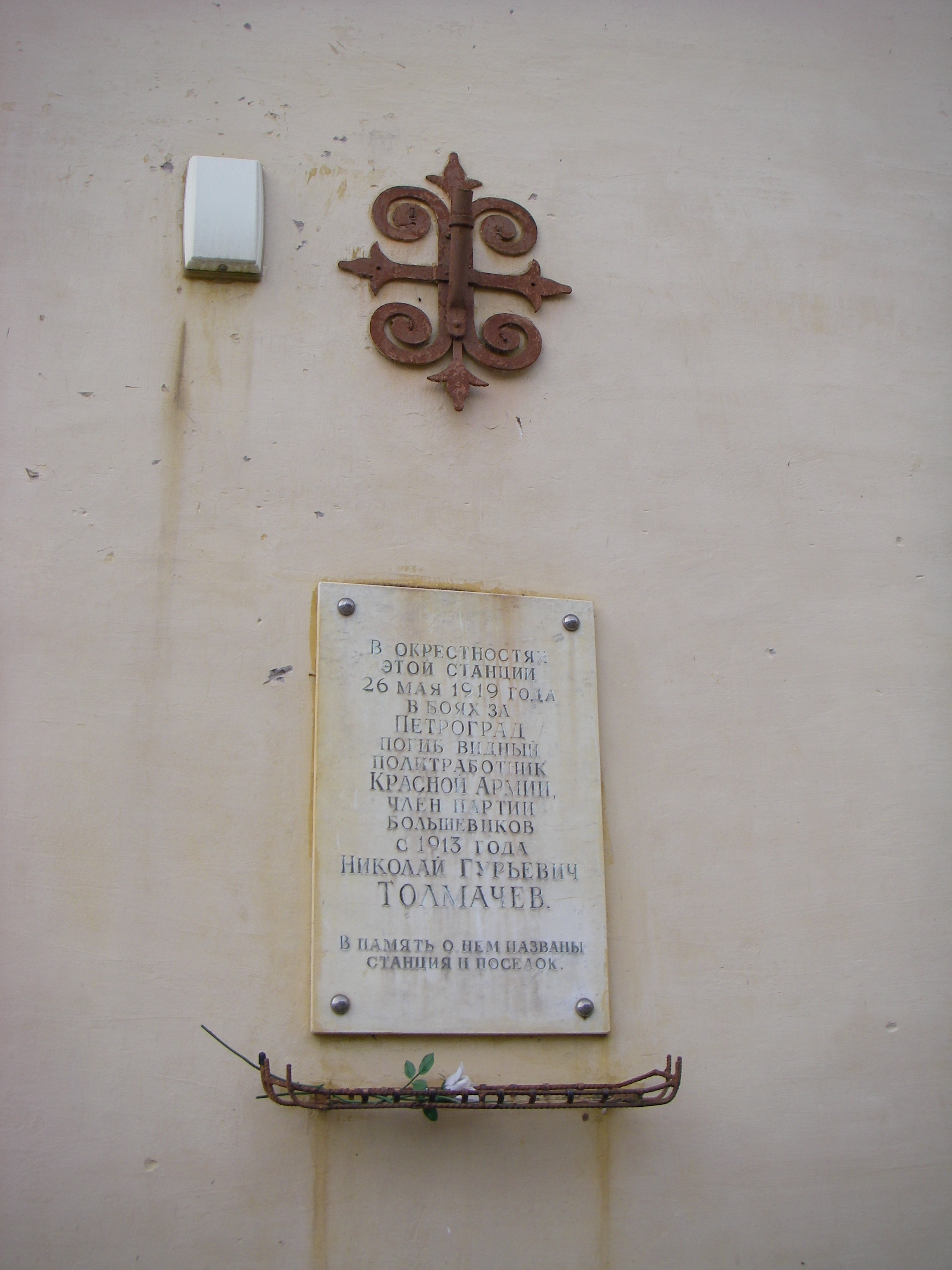
Memorial plaque on the building of the station Tolmachevo

The name of Nikolai Tolmachyov are the streets:

- in Pavlovsk – the former Aleksandrinskaya street (since 1919);
- in Perm – the former Bryukhanovskaya street (since 1920);
- in Yekaterinburg – former Kolobovskaya street (since 1920);
- in Rostov-on-Don;
- in Smolensk;
- in Rudny (Kazakhstan).

Usachev lane in Luga in the 1920s was renamed Tolmachyov Lane.

From August 20, 1919, to 1991, Karavannaya Street in Saint Petersburg was called Tolmachyov Street.

The village of Preobrazhenskoye near Luga, named after the temple erected in the village in honor of the Transfiguration Savior, was renamed Tolmachyovo. The railway station in this village was also renamed.

In November 1919, the Nikolai Tolmachyov Teaching Institute of the Red Army was established on the basis of agitator courses, which was charged with training teachers for the Red Army literacy schools, political instructors, lecturers and librarians. At its base, the Military Political Academy (now the Military University of the Ministry of Defense of the Russian Federation) was also founded, also bearing the name of Tolmachyov, and renamed after Vladimir Lenin in 1938.

== Sources ==
- Soviet Military Encyclopedia
- Great Soviet Encyclopedia
- Military History Magazine – 2004 – No.11 – 26 Pages
- Karamyshev. Fighter, Commissioner, Journalist – Moscow, 1960
- Nikolay Mansvetov. Nikolai Tolmachyov – Leningrad, 1960
- Heroes of October – Leningrad, 1967 – Volume 2
- Lenin's Guard of the Urals – Sverdlovsk, 1967
- Galina Smolitskaya. Toponymic Dictionary of Central Russia – Moscow: Armada-Press, 2002 – 350 Pages
