= Siversky =

Siversky Сиверский
- Urban-type settlement
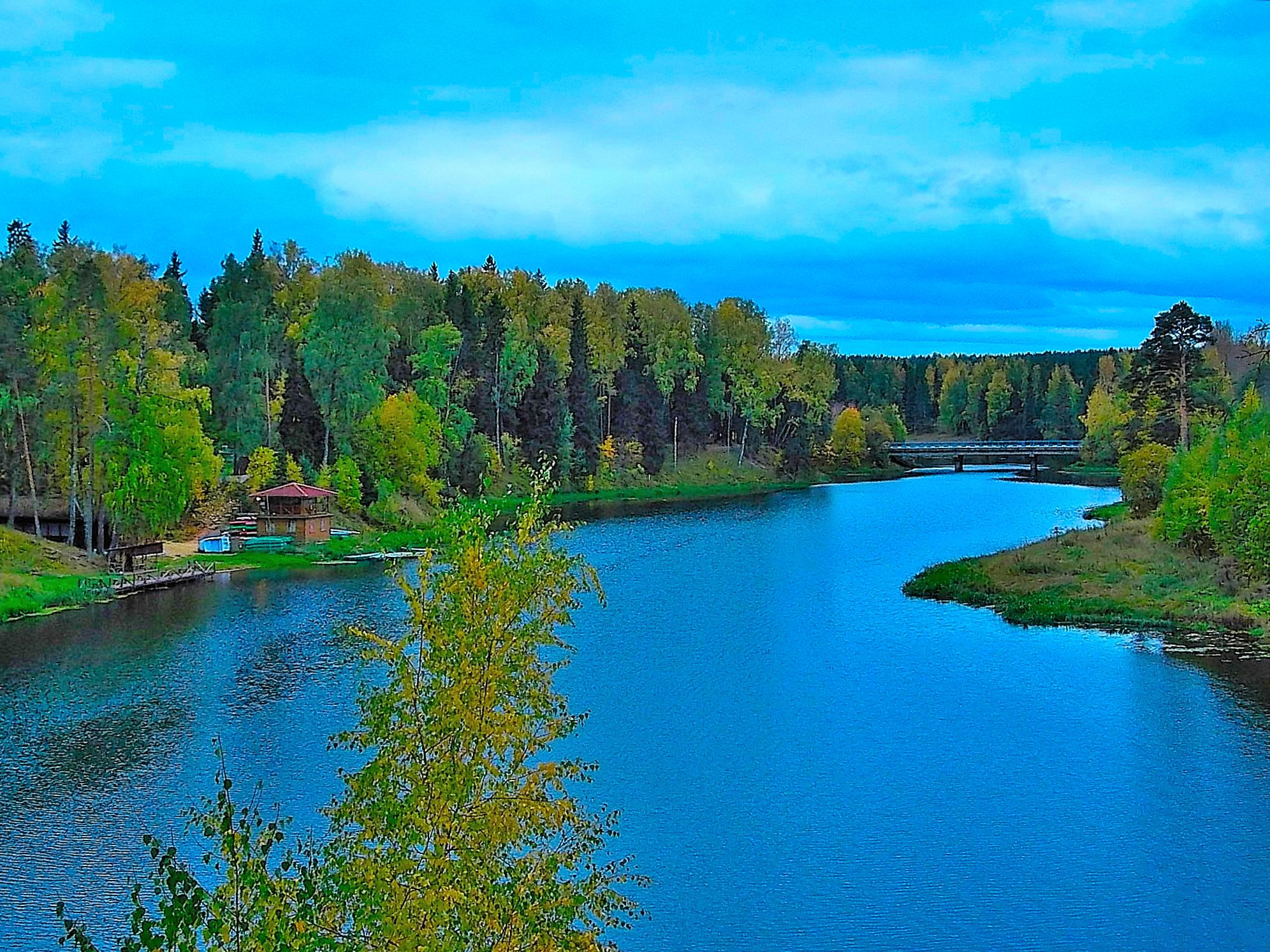
- Interactive map of Siversky
- Location of Siversky Siversky (Leningrad Oblast)
- Coordinates: 59°21′N 30°05′E
- Country: Russia
- Federal subject: Leningrad Oblast
- Administrative district: Gatchinsky District
- Urban-type settlement status since: 1938
- Elevation: 100 m (330 ft)

Population (2010 Census)
  - Total: 12,216
  - Estimate (2024): 13,156 (+7.7%)

Municipal status
  - Municipal district: Gatchinsky Municipal District
  - Urban settlement: Siverskoye Urban Settlement
  - Capital of: Siverskoye Urban Settlement
- Time zone: UTC+3 (MSK)
- Postal codes: 188330, 188332, 188333, 188338
- OKTMO ID: 41618169051
- Website: mo-siverskoe.ru

Siversky (Russian: Си́верский) is an urban locality (an urban-type settlement) in Gatchinsky District of Leningrad Oblast, Russia, on the bank of the Oredezh River. Its population was 12,216 (2010 census); 12,137 (2002 census); 11,885 (1989 Soviet census).

The banks of the Oredezh River through Siversky are lined with red sand, suggesting an iron presence in the river or its surrounding soil.

== History ==
The Siverskaya railway station opened in 1857 and became a popular summer holiday destination for middle-class inhabitants of Saint Petersburg. At the time, the settlement of Siverskaya belonged to Tsarskoselsky Uyezd of Saint Petersburg Governorate (renamed in 1913 Petrograd Governorate and in 1924 Leningrad Governorate). On November 20, 1918 the uyezd was renamed Detskoselsky. On February 14, 1923 Detskoselsky and Petergofsky Uyezds were abolished and merged into Gatchinsky Uyezd, with the administrative center located in Gatchina. On February 14, 1923 Gatchina was renamed Trotsk, and Gatchinsky Uyezd was renamed Trotsky Uyezd, after Leon Trotsky.

On August 1, 1927, the uyezds were abolished and Trotsky District, with the administrative center in the town of Trotsk, was established. The governorates were also abolished, and the district was a part of Leningrad Okrug of Leningrad Oblast. On August 2, 1929, after Trotsky was deported from Soviet Union, Trotsk was renamed Krasnogvardeysk, and the district was renamed Krasnogvardeysky. On July 23, 1930, the okrugs were abolished as well, and the districts were directly subordinated to the oblast. On November 27, 1938 the suburban settlements of Siverskaya, Kezevo, Dernovsky, and Druzhnoselye were merged into the settlement of Siversky, which was granted urban-type settlement status. On January 28, 1944 Krasnogvardeysk was renamed Gatchina, and the district was renamed Gatchinsky.

== Economy ==
=== Industry ===
There are several enterprises of timber industry and construction industry in Siversky.

=== Transportation ===
The Siverskaya railway station is located on the Saint Petersburg–Warsaw Railway, receiving suburban trains from the Baltiysky railway station of St. Petersburg.

Siversky is connected by roads with Volosovo, Gatchina, and with Tosno via Vyritsa. It also has access to the M20 highway, connecting Saint Petersburg and Pskov. Regular bus traffic between Saint Petersburg (at the time, Leningrad) and Siversky was opened in 1936, and regular local bus traffic was opened in April 1950.

== Culture and recreation ==
Siversky contains one cultural heritage monument of federal significance and additionally four objects classified as cultural and historical heritage of local significance. The federal monument is the house where the author Mikhail Saltykov-Shchedrin lived in 1884. The nearby Rozhdestveno Memorial Estate, also protected at the federal level, commemorates Vladimir Nabokov who spent his summers in the area during his youth.

In Siversky, the Dachnaya Stolitsa Ethnographic Museum (the Capital of the Dachas) is open. It shows the history of Siversky as a suburban settlement in the end of the 19th and the beginning of the 20th centuries.

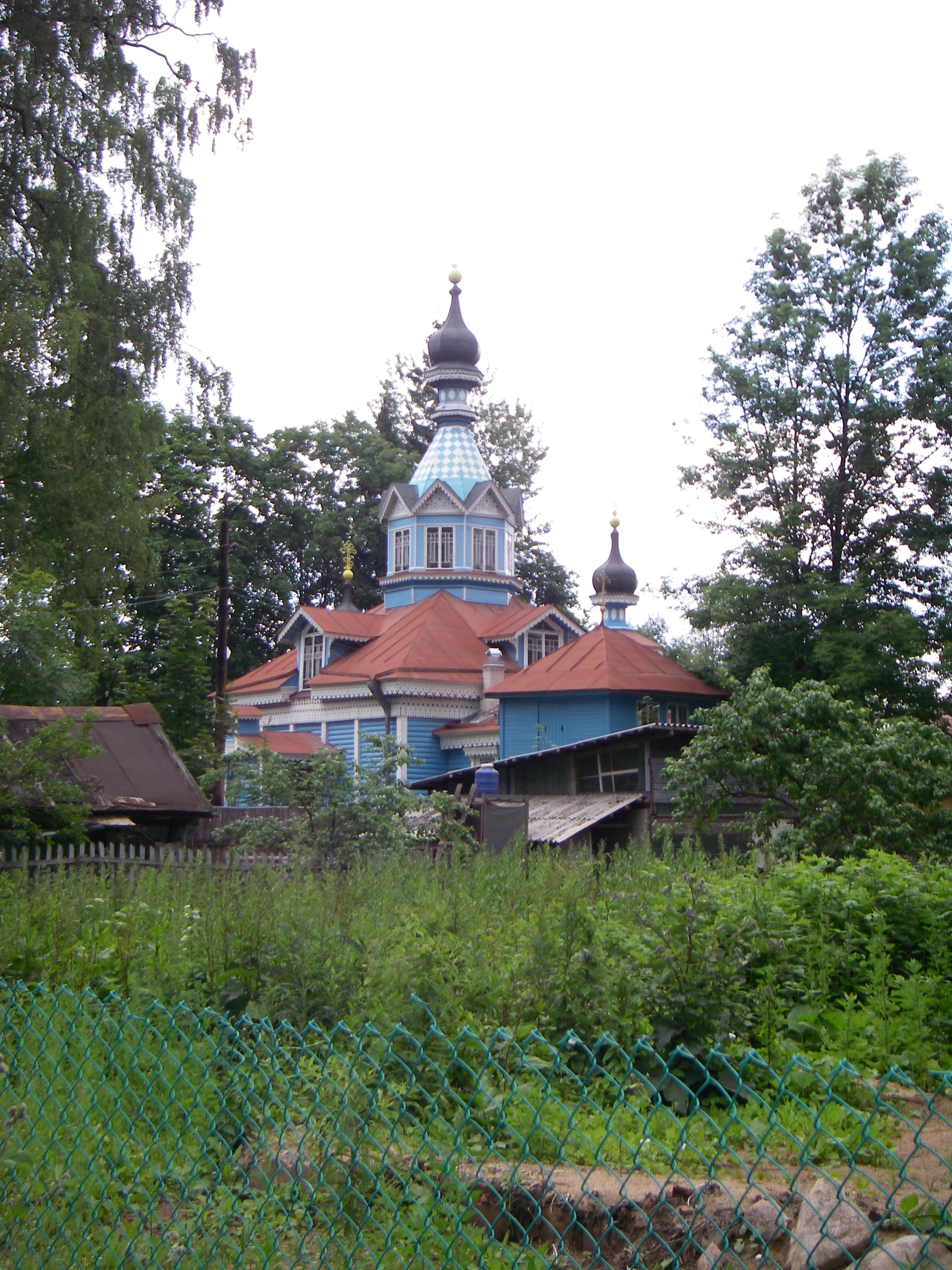
The Church of Sts. Peter and Paul

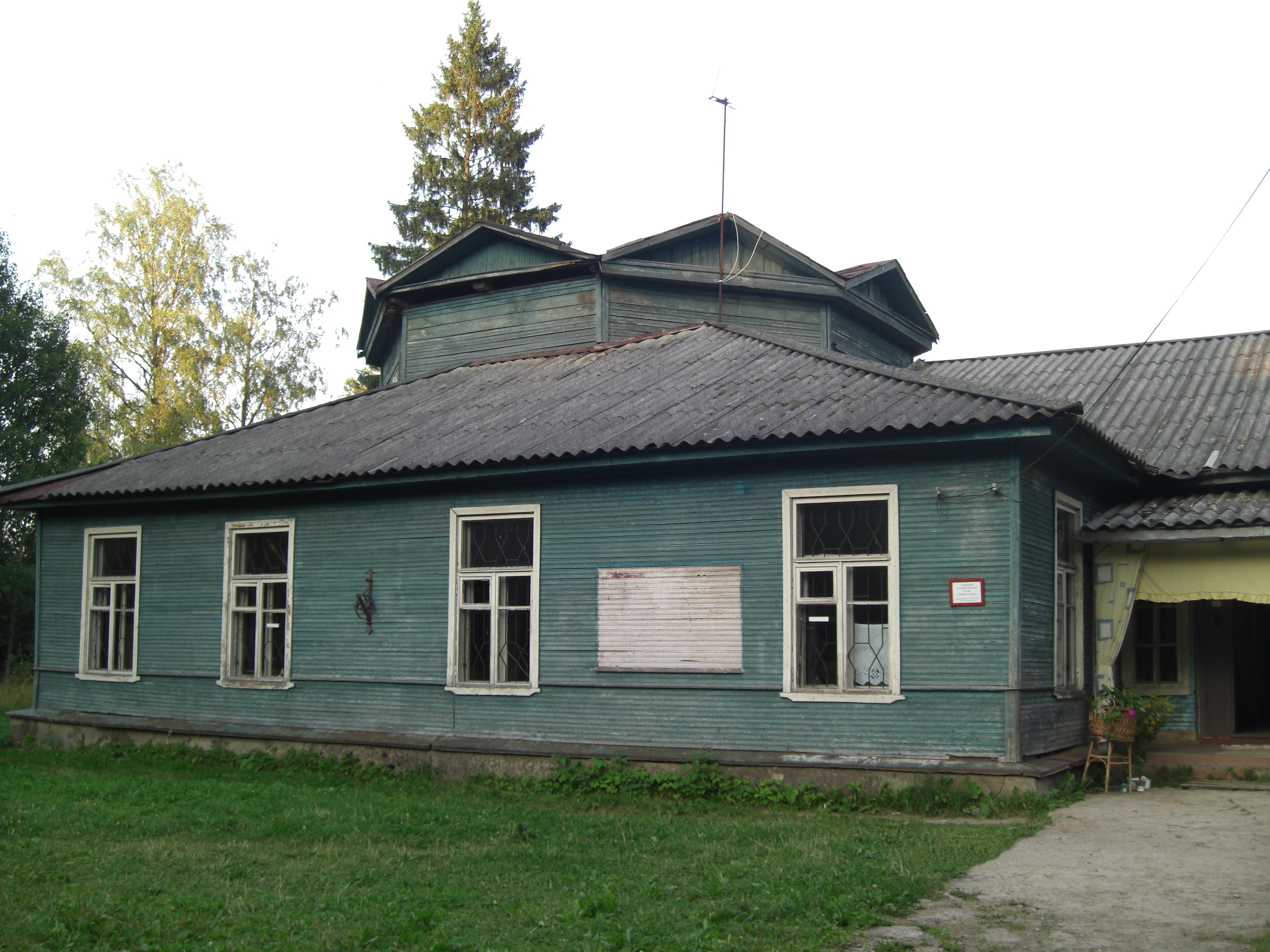
Ethnographic museum Dachnaya Stolitsa ("Capital of dachas")

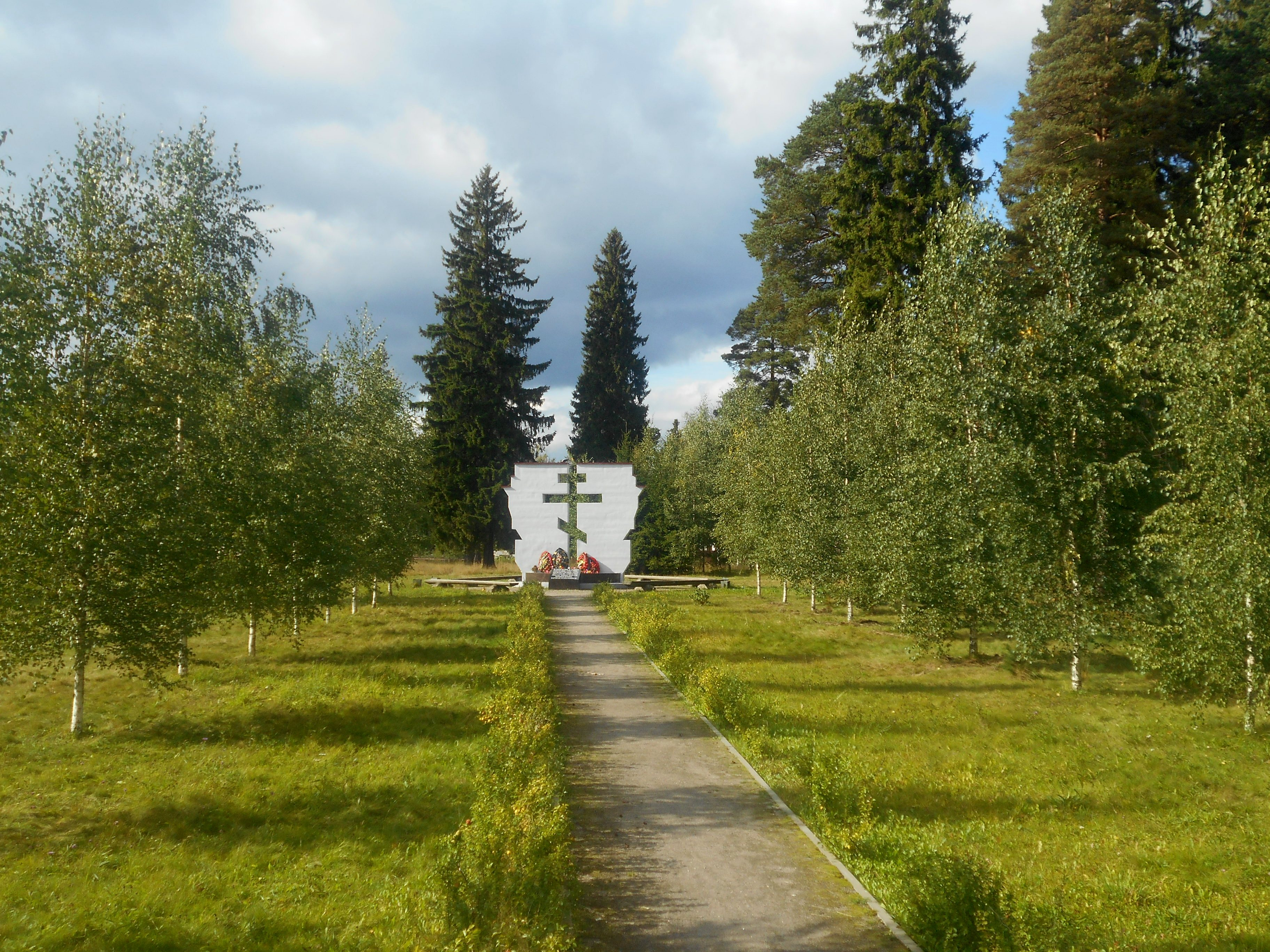
Great Patriotic War memorial "Stroganov Bridge"

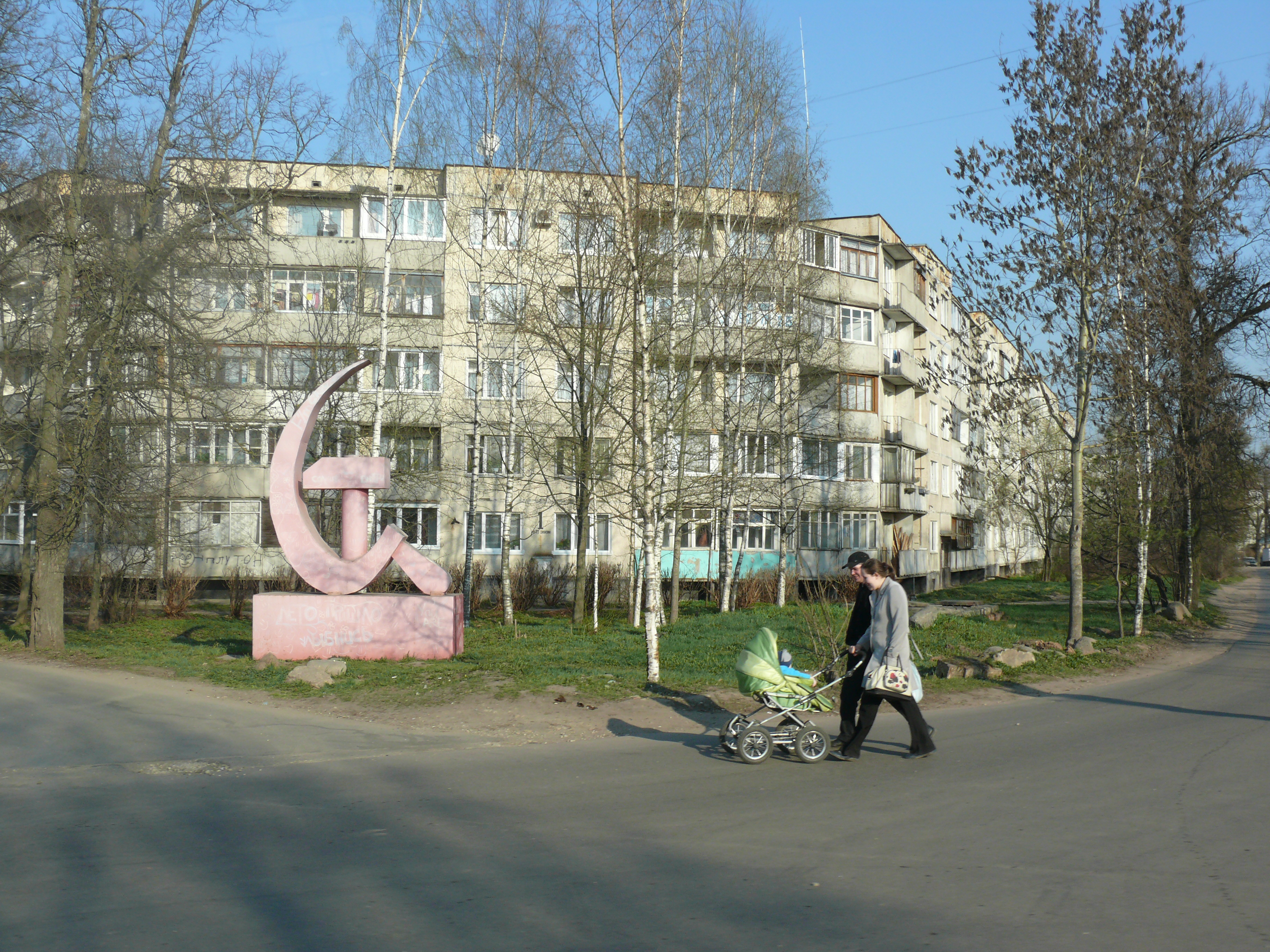
Sculpture of Hammer and sickle

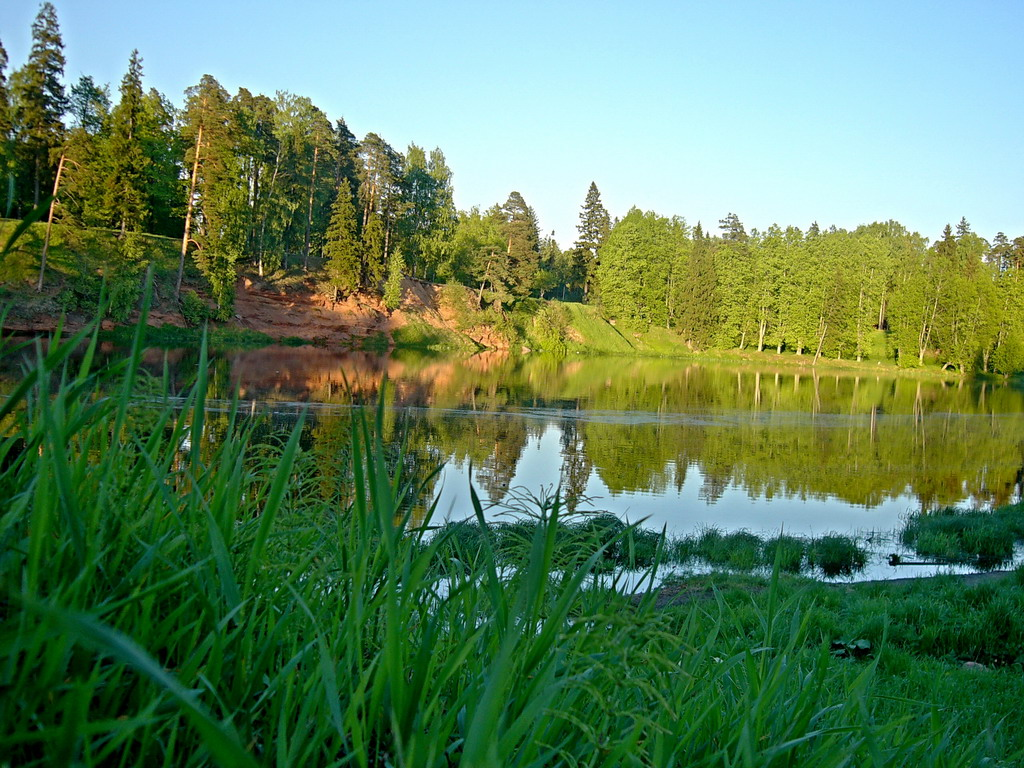
The shore of the Oredezh River in Siversky
