= Mshinskoye Boloto Zakaznik =

Protected area in Leningrad Oblast, Russia

- IUCN category III (natural monument or feature)
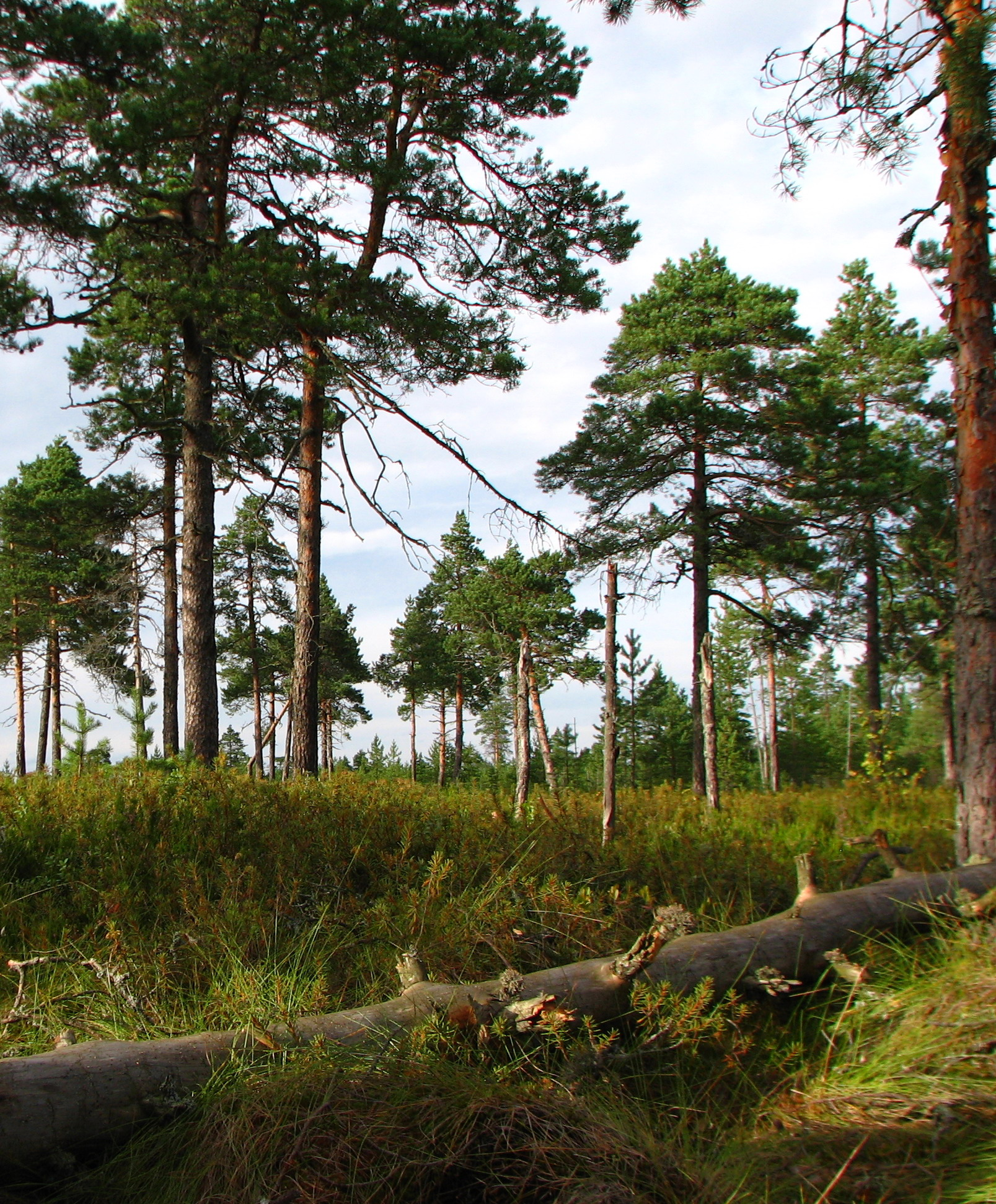
- A swamp with pine forest close to Lake Velye

- Location within Russia
- Location: Russia
- Nearest city: Luga
- Coordinates: 59°03′N 30°13′E
- Area: 604 km^{2} (233 sq mi)
- Established: 1982

Ramsar Wetland
- Official name: Mshinskaye wetland system
- Designated: 13 September 1994
- Reference no.: 692

Mshinskoye Boloto Zakaznik (Russian: заказник Мшинское болото) is a federal zakaznik, a nature protected area, in the northwest of Russia, located in Gatchinsky and Luzhsky Districts of Leningrad Oblast, in the basin of the Luga River. It was established in 1982 to protect the bogs, marshes, and reed bed ecosystems including some nearby pine forests. Since 1994, it is a Ramsar Wetland.

== Geography ==
Mshinskoye Boloto is located at the divide of the Oredezh River (east) and the Yashchera River (west), both being tributaries of the Luga River. In the center of the area there are Lake Vyalye, Lake Strechno (which are connected with each other) and Lake Mochalishche. The whole area is a wetland and hardly accessible. Bogs occupy about 40% of the area of the zakaznik. Woods occupy 49% of the area, 26% are coniferous forests.

== History ==
In 1972, the area was designated as an important natural landscape. The federal zakaznik was created on August 30, 1982. In 1994, Mshinskoye Boloto Zakaznik, together with the adjacent regional North of Mshinskoye Boloto Zakaznik was classified as a Ramsar wetland (Mshinskaya Wetland).

== Fauna ==
The wetland is a bird sanctuary. Rare species of birds include osprey, golden eagle, white stork, black stork, black-throated loon, whooper swan, Eurasian curlew, Eurasian eagle-owl, and Eurasian bittern.
