= Vyritsa =

Vyritsa Вырица
- Urban-type settlement
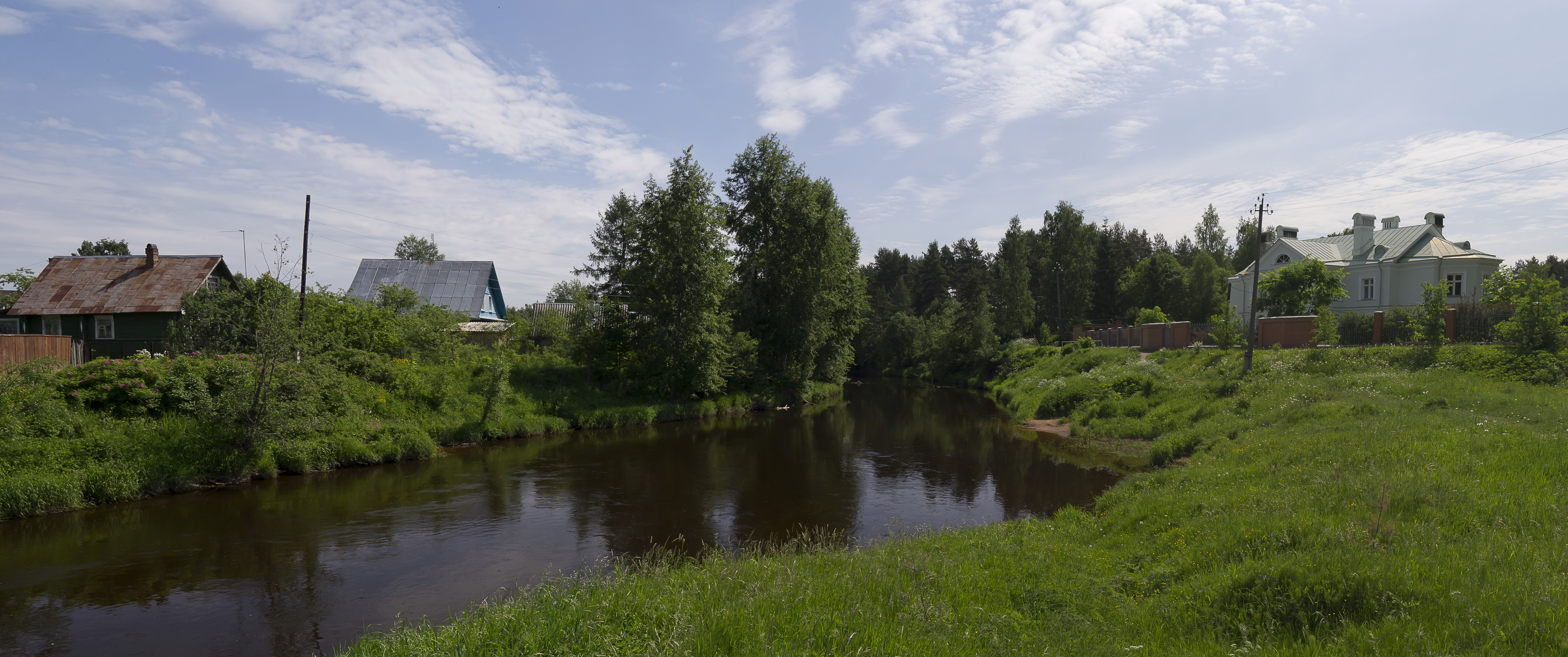
- Interactive map of Vyritsa
- Location of Vyritsa Vyritsa (Leningrad Oblast)
- Coordinates: 59°24′40″N 30°20′50″E
- Country: Russia
- Federal subject: Leningrad Oblast
- Administrative district: Gatchinsky District
- Station and suburban settlement: 1903
- Urban-type settlement status since: 1938

Population (2010 Census)
  - Total: 11,884
  - Estimate (2024): 14,873 (+25.2%)

Municipal status
  - Municipal district: Gatchinsky Municipal District
  - Urban settlement: Vyritskoye Urban Settlement
  - Capital of: Vyritskoye Urban Settlement
- Time zone: UTC+3 (MSK)
- Postal code: 188380–188382
- OKTMO ID: 41618154051
- Website: www.vyritsa-adm.ru

Vyritsa (Russian: Вы́рица, Finnish: Viiritsa) is an urban locality (an urban-type settlement) in Gatchinsky District of Leningrad Oblast, Russia, located on the bank of the Oredezh River, southwest of the town of Gatchina. Population: 11,884 (2010 census); 11,163 (2002 census); 12,656 (1989 Soviet census).

== History ==
Vyritsa railway station was opened in December 1903. The lands around the station became expensive and were quickly sold for summer houses. Originally, Vyritsa was a suburban settlement and belonged to Tsarskoselsky District of Saint Petersburg Governorate (renamed in 1913 Petrograd Governorate and in 1924 Leningrad Governorate). In the 1910s, the population of Vyritsa was increasing every summer by 10,000 people. On November 20, 1918, the uyezd was renamed Detskoselsky. On February 14, 1923, Detskoselsky and Petergofsky Uyezds were abolished and merged into Gatchinsky Uyezd, with the administrative center located in Gatchina. Also on February 14, Gatchina was renamed Trotsk, and Gatchinsky Uyezd was renamed Trotsky Uyezd, after Leon Trotsky.

On August 1, 1927, the uyezds were abolished and Trotsky District, with the administrative center in the town of Trotsk, was established. The governorates were also abolished, and the district was a part of Leningrad Okrug of Leningrad Oblast. On August 2, 1929, after Trotsky was deported from Soviet Union, Trotsk was renamed Krasnogvardeysk, and the district was renamed Krasnogvardeysky. On July 23, 1930, the okrugs were abolished as well, and the districts were directly subordinated to the oblast. On November 27, 1938 Vyritsa was granted urban-type settlement status. Between 1941 and 1944, Vyritsa was occupied by Nazi German troops. On January 28, 1944 Krasnogvardeysk was renamed Gatchina, and the district was renamed Gatchinsky.

== Economy ==
=== Industry ===
In Vyritsa, there are enterprises of timber, textile, and food industries.

=== Transportation ===
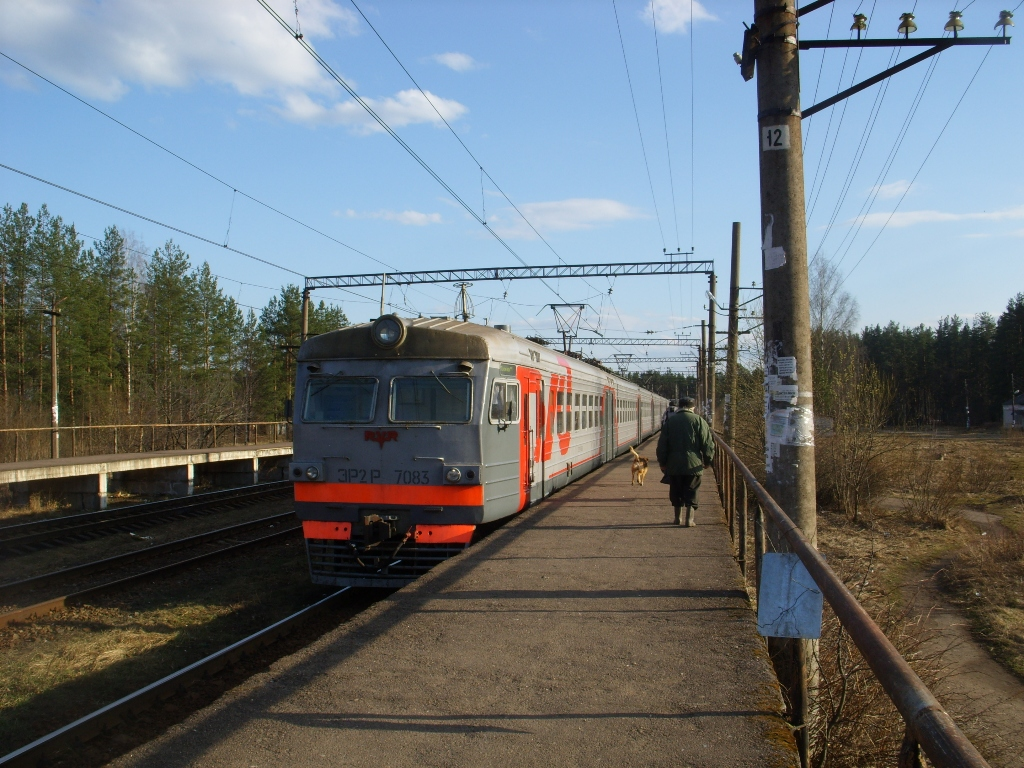
A suburban train at the Posyolok railway station.

Vyritsa is located on the railroad connecting the Vitebsky railway station of Saint Petersburg with Novosokolniki via Dno. There are two stations on the main line, Vyritsa railway station and Mikhaylovka railway station. Additionally, a railroad branches off at Vyritsa railway station and proceeds southwest along the main axis of the settlement. There are four more railway stations at this branch, all directly served from the Vitebsky railway station: Pervaya Platforma, Vtoraya Platforma, Tretya Platforma, and Posyolok.

Vyritsa is connected by roads with Gatchina, Pavlovsk, Volosovo, and Tosno.

== Culture and recreation ==
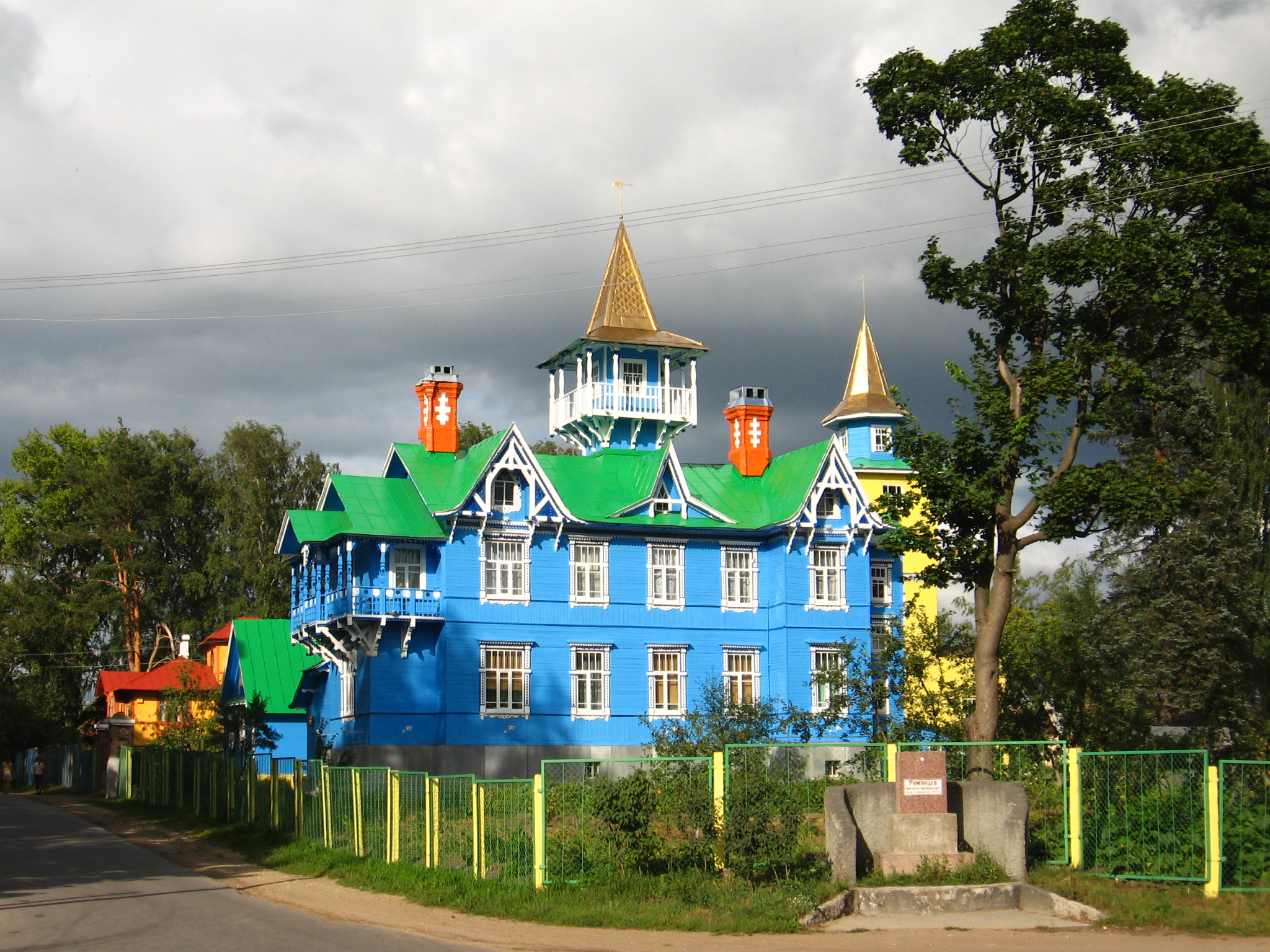
House built by Ivan Churikov in 1906

Vyritsa contains four objects classified as cultural and historical heritage of local significance. These are an archeological site, two monuments commemorating the events of World War II, and the birthplace of author and paleonthologist Ivan Yefremov.

Serafim Vyritsky, who was previously a monk with Alexander Nevsky Lavra in Saint Peterburg, lived in Vyritsa from 1930 to 1949. He died and is buried in Vyritsa. He was later canonized as a saint by the Russian Orthodox Church.

The only member of atmospheric black metal band Sivyj Yar is from Vyritsa.
