= Luga (river) =

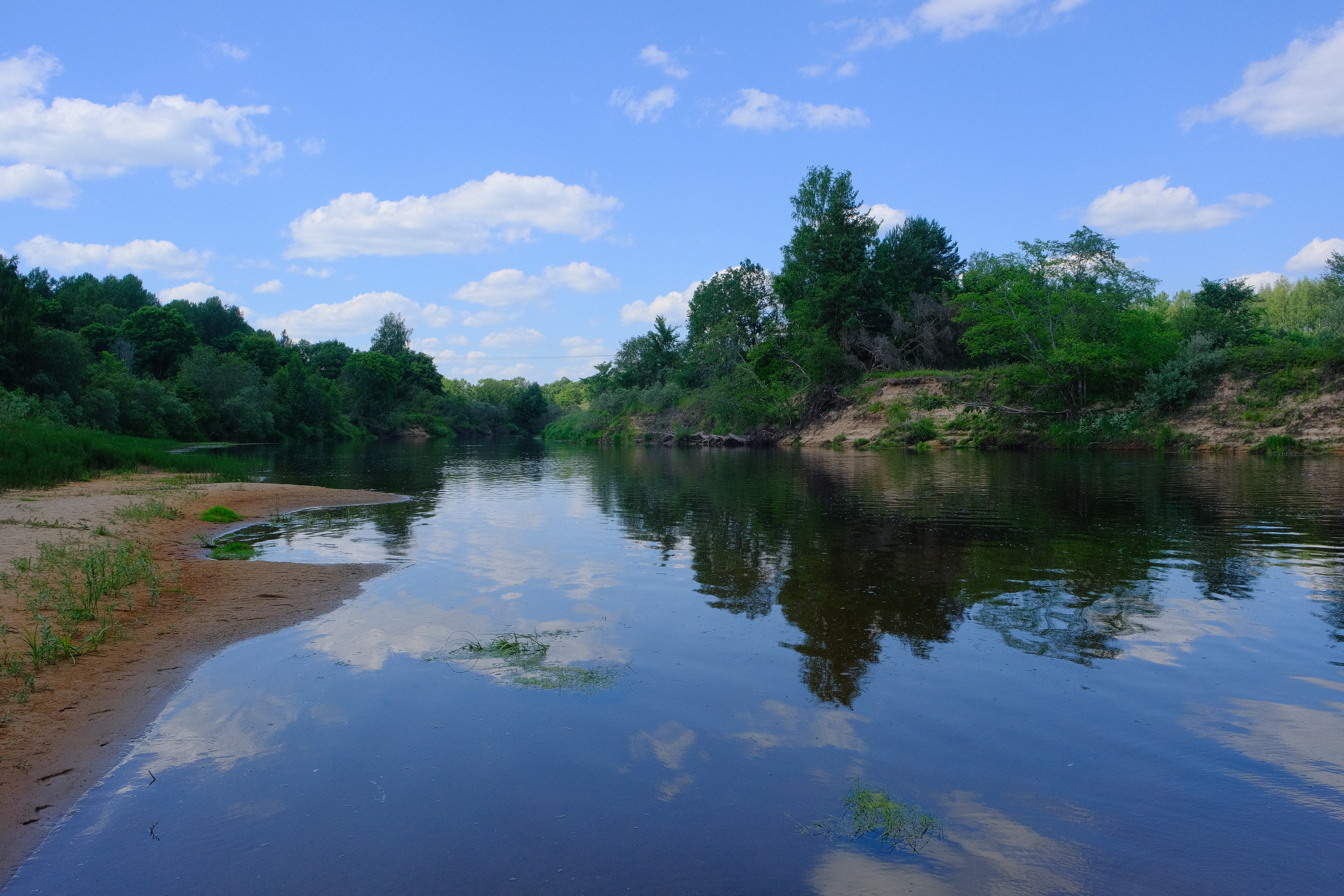
- Luga River near Zhelezo geographical station

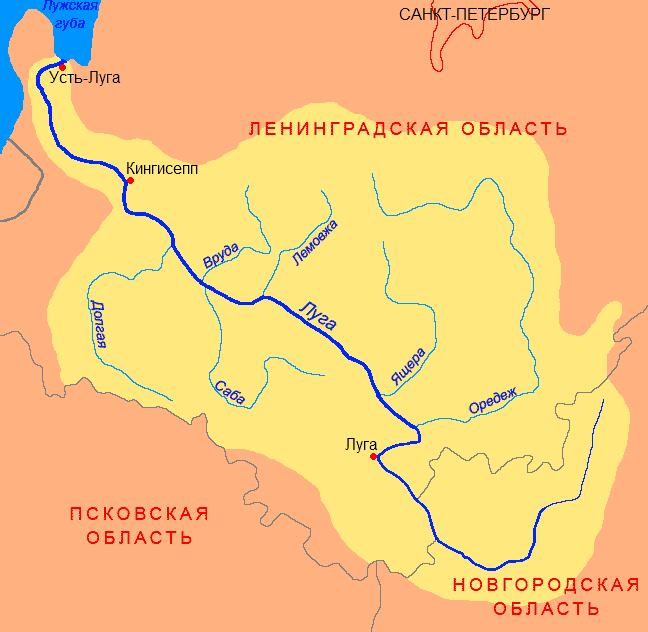
- Map of the Luga basin

Location
- Country: Russia

Physical characteristics
- Mouth: Gulf of Finland
  - coordinates: 59°40′38″N 28°18′41″E
- Length: 353 km (219 mi)
- Basin size: 13,200 km^{2} (5,100 sq mi)
- Discharge
  - average: about 100 m^{3}/s (3,500 cu ft/s)

Basin features
- Tributaries
  - left: Saba
  - right: Oredezh, Yashchera

The Luga (Russian: Луга) is a river in Novgorodsky and Batetsky Districts of Novgorod Oblast and Luzhsky, Volosovsky, Slantsevsky, and Kingiseppsky Districts of Leningrad Oblast of Russia. The river flows into the Luga Bay of the Gulf of Finland. It freezes up in the early December and stays under the ice until early April. The length of the Luga is 353 kilometres (219 mi), and the area of its drainage basin is 13,200 square kilometres (5,100 sq mi). Its main tributary is the Oredezh (right). The towns of Luga and Kingisepp, as well as the urban-type settlement of Tolmachyovo are located on the banks of the Luga. The mouth of the Luga is the site of the Ust-Luga container terminal.

The source of the Luga is located in a peat production area in the northwest of Novgorod Oblast, several dozen kilometers northwest of the city of Veliky Novgorod. The river flows south, crosses into Batetsky District, and gradually turns west. A stretch of the Luga serves the border between Novgorod and Leningrad Oblasts. There, the Luga flows northwest, in the town of Luga turns north, accepts the Oredezh from the right, and flows through the urban-type settlement of Tolmachyovo. There, it turns northwest and reaches the border of Luzhsky District. A stretch of the Luga forms the borders between Gatchinsky and Volosovsky, Slantsevsky and Volosovsky, and Kingiseppsky and Volosovsky Districts. In the town of Kingisepp the Luga turns north and subsequently northeast. The mouth of the Luga River is located in the settlement of Ust-Luga.

The drainage basin of the Luga includes large areas in the north of Novgorod Oblast (Novgorodsky and Batetsky Districts), as well as in the southwest of Leningrad Oblast (Gatchinsky, Luzhsky, Volosovsky, Slantsevsky, and Kingiseppsky Districts). In particular, it contains Shum-gora, an archaeological site near the banks of the river in Novgorodsky Oblast, and the Mshinskoye Boloto Zakaznik in Leningrad Oblast, shared between the basins of the Oredezh and the Yashchera.

The Luga below the town of Kingisepp is navigable; however, there is no passenger navigation.

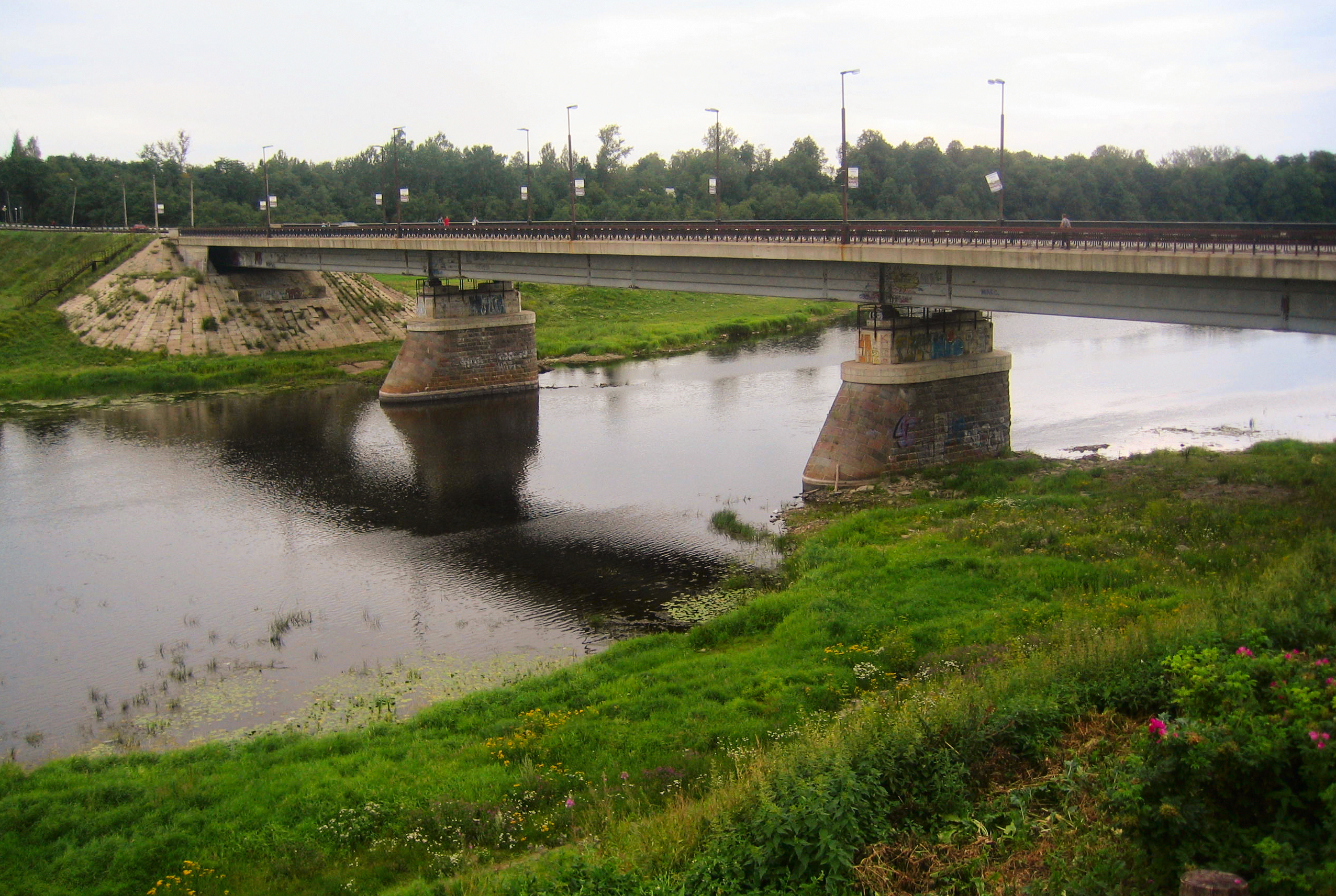
Bridge over the Luga in Kingisepp

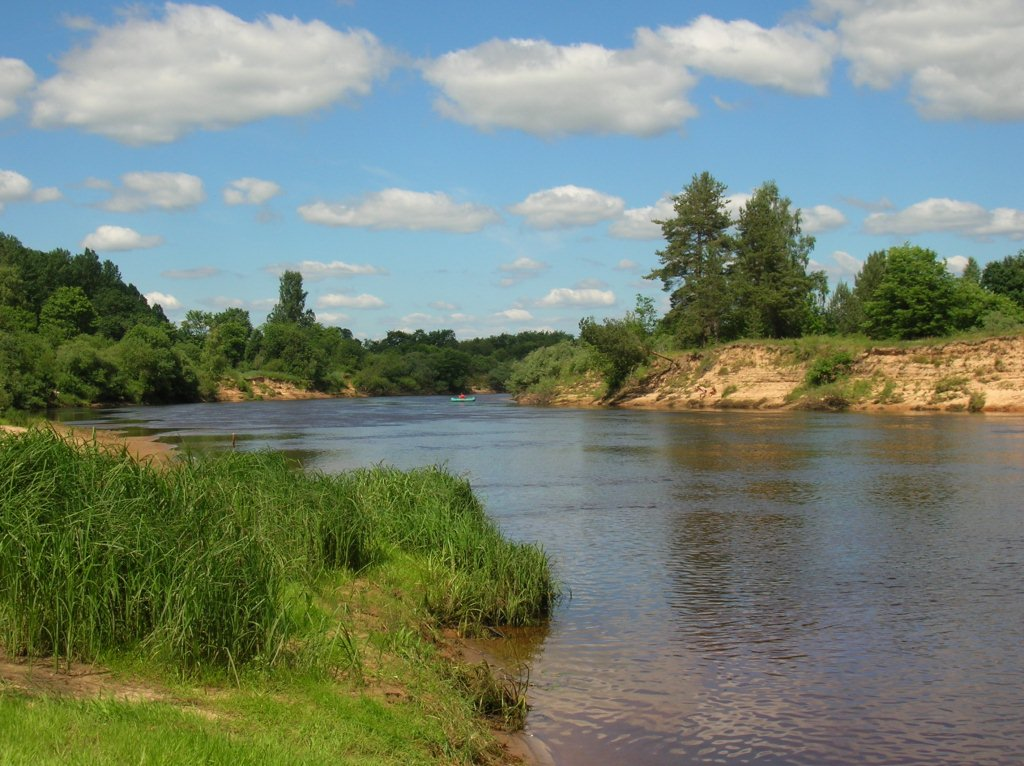
The Luga in Zhelezo, Luzhsky District
