= Saba (Luga) =

River in Russia

Location
- Country: Russia

Physical characteristics
- Source
  - location: Krasnogorskoye Lake
- Mouth: Luga
  - coordinates: 59.1317°N 29.0058°E
- Length: 90 km (56 mi)
- Basin size: 1,320 km^{2} (510 sq mi)

Basin features
- Progression: Luga→ Gulf of Finland

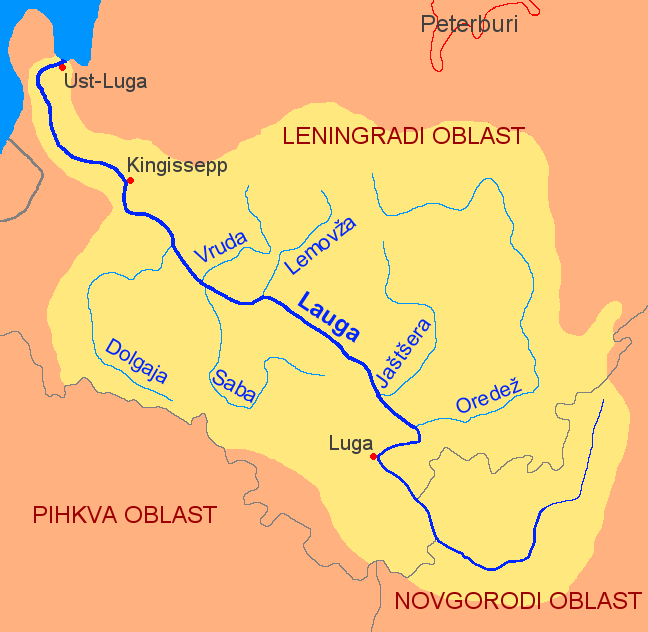
Map of the Luga basin.

The Saba (Russian: Саба) is a river in Leningrad Oblast, Russia, a left tributary of the Luga. It is 90 kilometres (56 mi) long. The area of its drainage basin is 1,320 square kilometres (510 mi^{2}). Its origin is southwestern portion of Krashogorskoye Lake. Main tributaries include:

- Left: Elemenka, Sabitsa, Syaberka, Kerina, Uzminka, Luzhinka
- Right: Sarka, Belka
