= Ploskoye =

Ploskoye Плоское
- Khutor
- Location within Belgorod Oblast Location within Russia
- Coordinates: 50°33′N 38°01′E
- Country: Russia
- Region: Belgorod Oblast
- District: Volokonovsky District
- Time zone: UTC+3:00

Ploskoye (Russian: Плоское) is a rural locality (a khutor) in Volokonovsky District, Belgorod Oblast, Russia. The population was 64 as of 2010. There are 2 streets.

== Geography ==
Ploskoye is located 20 km northeast of Volokonovka (the district's administrative centre) by road. Repyevka is the nearest rural locality.
