= Tsarskoselsky Uyezd =

Tsarskoselsky Uyezd (Царскосельский уезд) was one of the subdivisions of the Saint Petersburg Governorate of the Russian Empire. It was situated in the central part of the governorate. Its administrative centre was Tsarskoye Selo (Pushkin). In terms of present-day administrative borders, the territory of Tsarskoselsky Uyezd is divided between the Pushkinsky, Krasnoselsky and Krasnoselsky districts of Saint Petersburg and the Gatchinsky, Volosovsky and Tosnensky districts of Leningrad Oblast.

== Demographics ==
At the time of the Russian Empire Census of 1897, Tsarskoselsky Uyezd had a population of 149,845. Of these, 65.5% spoke Russian, 25.7% Finnish, 2.5% Estonian, 2.1% German, 1.9% Polish, 0.5% Yiddish, 0.5% Ukrainian, 0.4% Latvian, 0.3% Belarusian, 0.2% Lithuanian, 0.2% Tatar, 0.1% Swedish and 0.1% French as their native language.
