= Gatchinsky District =

Gatchinsky District Гатчинский район (Russian)
- District
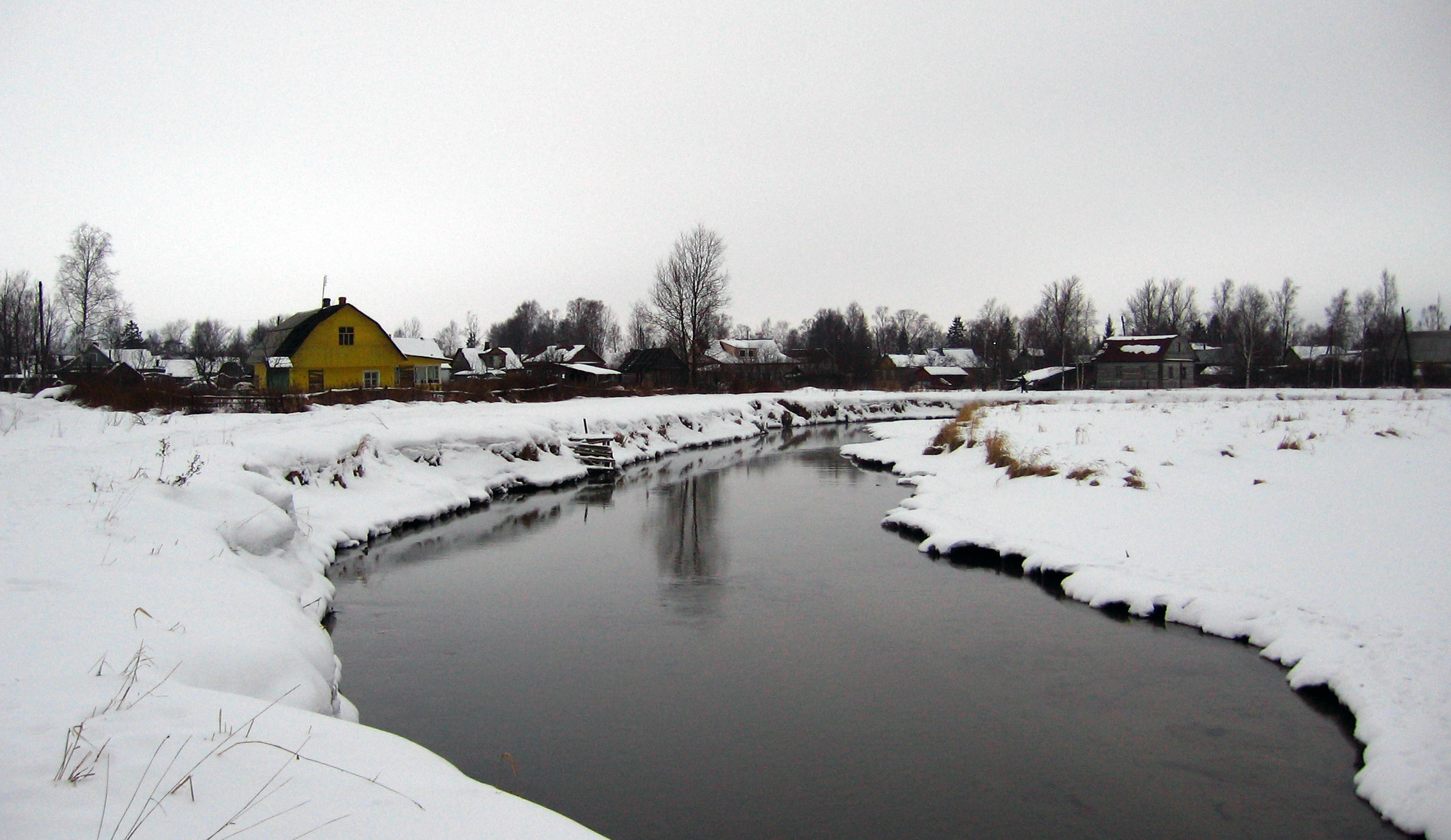
- The Izhora River near Myza-Ivanovka in Gatchinsky District

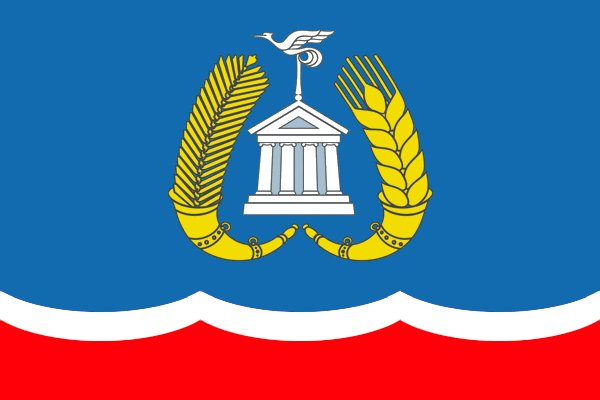
- Flag Coat of arms
- Location of Gatchinsky District in Leningrad Oblast
- Coordinates: 59°20′N 30°05′E
- Country: Russia
- Federal subject: Leningrad Oblast
- Established: 1927
- Administrative center: Gatchina

Area
  - Total: 2,868.7 km^{2} (1,107.6 sq mi)

Population (2010 Census)
  - Total: 140,210
  - Density: 48.876/km^{2} (126.59/sq mi)
  - Urban: 36.1%
  - Rural: 63.9%

Administrative structure
  - Administrative divisions: 11 Settlement municipal formations
  - Inhabited localities: 2 cities/towns, 4 urban-type settlements, 234 rural localities

Municipal structure
  - Municipally incorporated as: Gatchinsky Municipal District
  - Municipal divisions: 6 urban settlements, 11 rural settlements
- Time zone: UTC+3 (MSK)
- OKTMO ID: 41618000
- Website: http://radm.gtn.ru/

Gatchinsky District (Russian: Га́тчинский райо́н) is an administrative and municipal district (raion), one of the seventeen in Leningrad Oblast, Russia. It is located in the southwestern central part of the oblast and borders with Krasnoselsky, Moskovsky, and Pushkinsky Districts of the federal city of St. Petersburg in the north, Tosnensky District in the east, Luzhsky District in the south, Volosovsky District in the west, and with Lomonosovsky District in the northwest. The area of the district is 2,868.7 square kilometers (1,107.6 sq mi). Its administrative center is the town of Gatchina. Population (excluding the administrative center): 140,210 (2010 census); 132,010 (2002 Census); 138,022 (1989 Soviet census).

== Geography ==
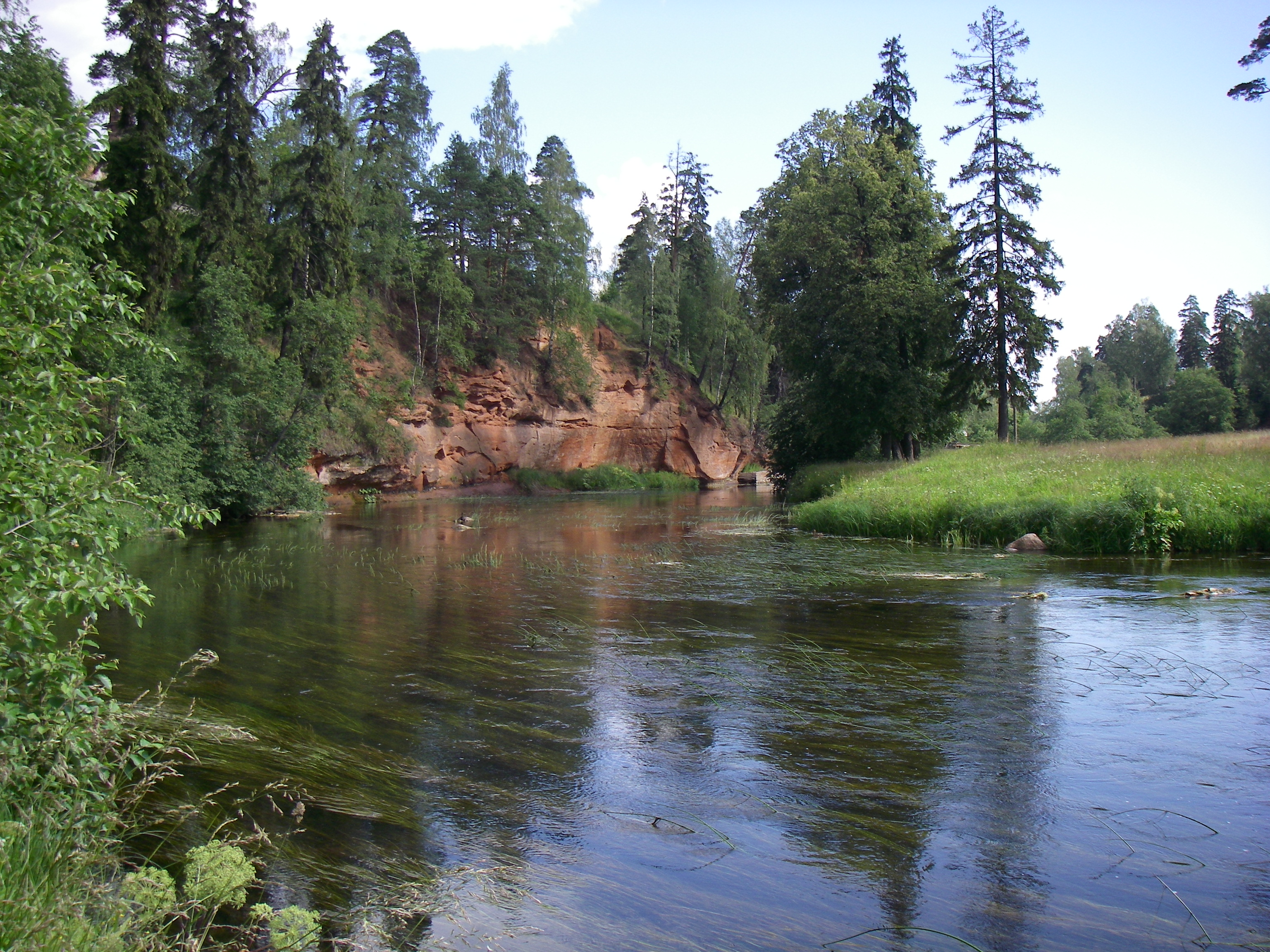
The Oredezh River close to the settlement of Siversky

The northern part of the district is essentially a mixture of urban areas - suburbs of Saint Petersburg - and summer house areas. The central and the southern parts are forested. Much of the area of the district belongs to the drainage basin of the Luga River, a tributary of the Gulf of Finland. The main tributary of the Luga within the district is the Oredezh River. Minor areas in the east of the district belong to the basin of the Tosna River, and the northern part of the district, including the town of Gatchina, belongs to the basin of the Izhora River. Both the Tosna and the Izhora are left tributaries of the Neva. Minor areas in the northwest in the district belong to the basin of the Strelka River, also a tributary of the Gulf of Finland.

In the south of the district, the Mshinskoye Boloto Zakaznik was created to protect the swamp landscape with the pine-tree forest. The zakaznik is shared with Luzhsky District.

== History ==
Originally, the area of the district was populated by Finnic peoples, in particular, the Izhorians. From the 9th century, the area was changing hands between Novgorod Republic (from the 15th century, the Grand Duchy of Moscow), and Sweden. Gatchina was first mentioned under 1499 as Khotchino. In 1617, according to the Treaty of Stolbovo, the area was transferred to Sweden, and in the 1700s, during the Great Northern War, it was conquered back by Russia. The city of Saint Petersburg was founded in 1703.

In the course of the administrative reform carried out in 1708 by Peter the Great, the area was included into Ingermanland Governorate (known since 1710 as Saint Petersburg Governorate). It was later split between Tsarskoselsky and Petergofsky Uyezds; the governorate was accordingly renamed Petrogradsky in 1913 and Leningradsky in 1924. Gatchina was chartered in 1796. It frequently was a residence of Russian Tsars, for instance, Pavel I grew up in Gatchina, and Alexander III lived almost exclusively there.

On November 20, 1918 Tsarskoye Selo was renamed Detskoye Selo, and the uyezd was renamed Detskoselsky. On February 14, 1923 Detskoselsky and Petergofsky Uyezds were abolished and merged into Gatchinsky Uyezd, with the administrative center located in Gatchina. On February 14, 1923 Gatchina was renamed Trotsk, and Gatchinsky Uyezd was renamed Trotsky Uyezd, after Leon Trotsky.

On August 1, 1927, the uyezds were abolished and Trotsky District, with the administrative center in the town of Trotsk, was established. The governorates were also abolished, and the district was a part of Leningrad Okrug of Leningrad Oblast. It included parts of former Trotsky Uyezd. On August 2, 1929, after Trotsky was deported from Soviet Union, Trotsk was renamed Krasnogvardeysk, and the district was renamed Krasnogvardeysky. On July 23, 1930, the okrugs were abolished as well, and the districts were directly subordinated to the oblast. In the 1930s, some areas from Oraniyenbaumsky and Luzhsky Districts were transferred to Krasnogvardeysky District. On October 3, 1938 Krasnogvardeysk was designated a town of oblast significance. Between September 1941 and January 1944 the area of Krasnogvardeysky District was occupied by German troops.

On January 28, 1944 Krasnogvardeysk was renamed Gatchina, and the district was renamed Gatchinsky. In 1963—1965, Lomonosovsky District was merged into Gatchinsky District, while at the same time parts of Gatchinsky District were transferred to Luzhsky District. In 1965, however, Gatchinsky District was restored in its old borders. In 2010, the administrative division of Leningrad Oblast was harmonized with the municipal division, and Gatchina was made the town of district significance.

On August 1, 1927, Oredezhsky District, with the administrative center in the settlement of Oredezh, was established as well. It was a part of Luga Okrug of Leningrad Oblast and included parts of former Trotsky and Luzhsky Uyezds, as well as of Novgorodsky Uyezd of Novgorod Governorate. On October 22, 1959 Oredezhsky District was abolished and split between Luzhsky and Gatchinsky Districts.

On August 19, 1936 Slutsky District was established. It included some areas from abolished Leningradsky Prigorodny District and from Tosnensky District. On June 23, 1939 parts of Krasnogvardeysky District were transferred to Slutsky District. On April 23, 1944 Slutsk was renamed Pavlovsk, and the district was renamed Pavlovsky. On July 25, 1953 Pavlovsky District was abolished and split between the city of Leningrad, Gatchinsky, and Tosnensky Districts.

== Economy ==
=== Industry ===
In 2011, industry was responsible for 73.7% GDP of the district. There are several enterprises related to timber industry, including two paper mills (30.4% of the GDP in 2011) and to food industry (30.1%), as well as a plant producing airplane motors and another one producing diverse electric equipment.

=== Agriculture ===
The main specializations of agriculture in the district are pig and poultry breeding.

=== Transportation ===
Two railroads cross the district from north to south. One connects Saint Petersburg with Dno and Nevel. Another one originates in Saint Petersburg, passes Gatchina, and proceeds to Luga and Pskov. Another railroad in the northern part of the district encircles Saint Petersburg from the south. It originates in Mga, passes Gatchina and proceeds west to Volosovo and Tallinn. All these railways have both suburban and long-distance passenger service.

The M20 highway connecting Saint Petersburg and Pskov, crosses the district from north to south. South of the town of Gatchina, it crosses the A120 highway, which encircles Saint Petersburg and crosses the district from east to west. A paved road connects Gatchina with Kingisepp via Volosovo. There are also local roads. The bus traffic in the district was opened in 1936, when a bus line connected Leningrad and Siversky. In 1940, passenger bus connection between Gatchina and Leningrad was opened.

== Culture and recreation ==
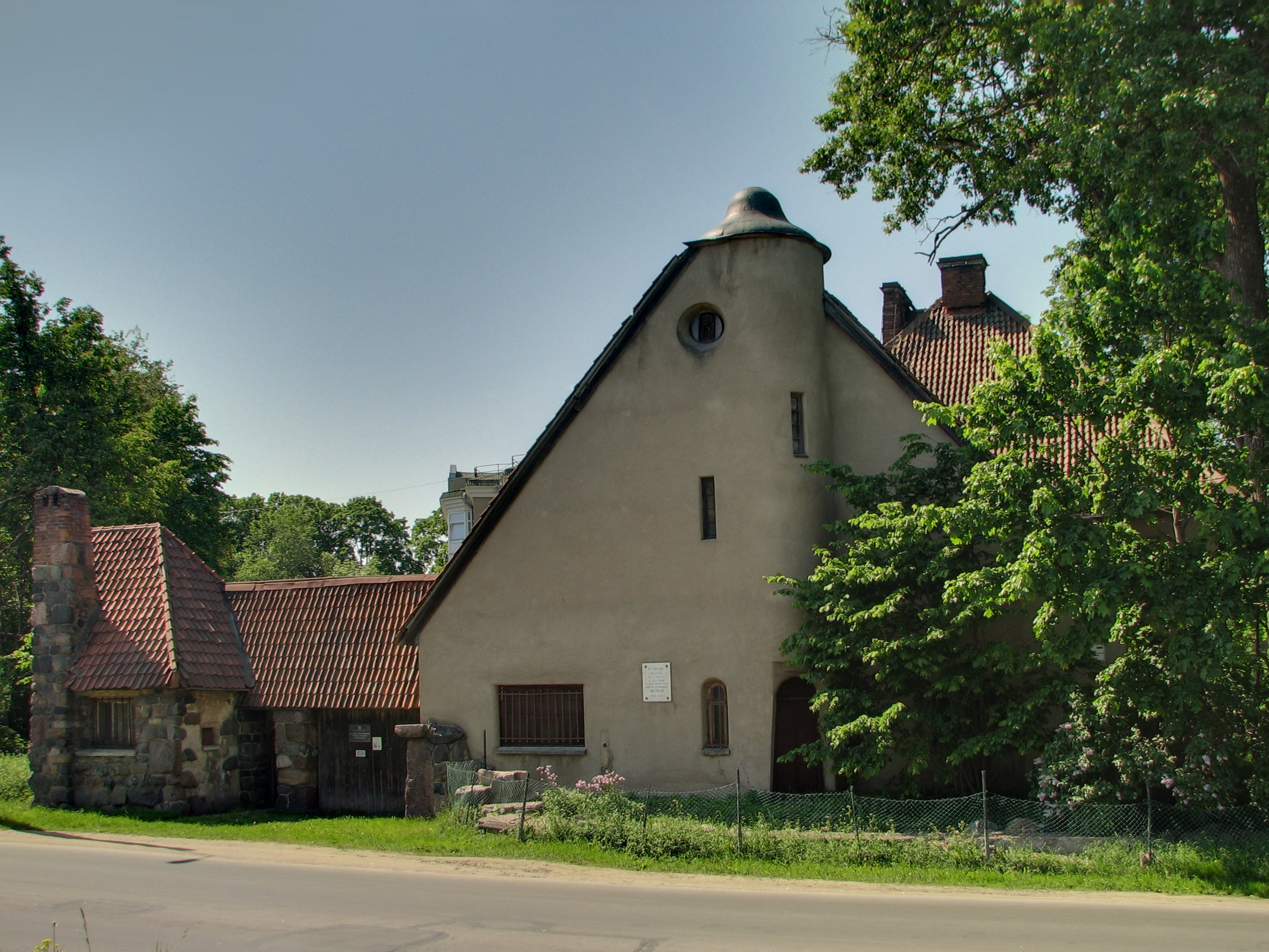
Pavel Shcherbov House, Gatchina

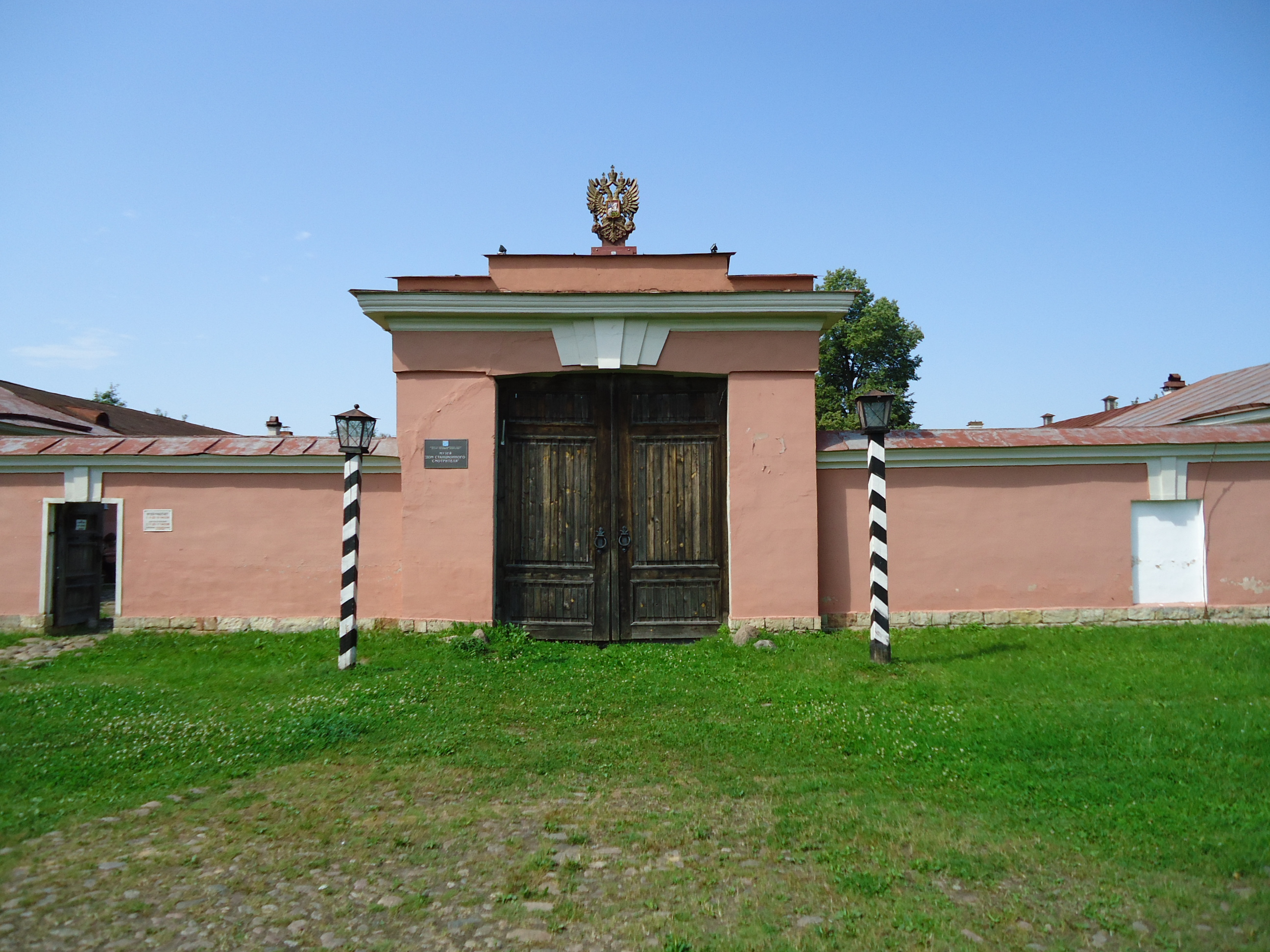
The House of the Station Master in Vyra

The district contains 221 cultural heritage monuments of federal significance (120 of them in the town of Gatchina) and additionally 447 objects classified as cultural and historical heritage of local significance (172 of them in the town of Gatchina). The federal monuments include the ensembles of the Gatchina Palace and the Priory Palace, with surrounding parks, in Gatchina, as well as several estates. Suyda was the Gannibal family estate and is related with the biography of Alexander Pushkin, a poet and influential figure in the creation of the modern Russian language, whereas Bolshiye Taytsy belonged to the Demidov family. Myza Ivanovka belonged to the architect Andrei Stackenschneider, who was also born in the estate.

The Gatchina ensembles were designated as a part of the World Heritage site Historic Centre of Saint Petersburg and Related Groups of Monuments.

Palaces and parks of Gatchina operate as the Gatchina Museum Reserve. It was opened to public in 1918, strongly damaged during World War II, then closed for restoration, and only reopened in 1976. The other two museums in Gatchina are the Museum-House of artist Pavel Shcherbov, which is itself an architectural monument built in the modernist style, and the Museum of Aviation Motor Construction, located at the motor plant. The Rozhdestveno Memorial Estate, owned for a short time by the future author Vladimir Nabokov, is located in the selo of Rozhdestveno and is a museum. Another museum was open in the village of Vyra, where Station Master, the short story by Pushkin from The Belkin Tales, takes place. The museum reconstructs the postal station of the 19th century. The village of Kobrino hosts one more museum related to Pushkin. The former Gannibal estate in Suyda was also transformed into a museum in 1999.
