= Luzhsky Uyezd =

Luzhsky Uyezd (Russian: Лужский уезд) was one of the eight subdivisions of the Saint Petersburg Governorate of the Russian Empire. Its capital was Luga. Luzhsky Uyezd was located in the southwestern part of the governorate (in the southwestern part of present-day Leningrad Oblast and in the northeastern part of Pskov Oblast).

== Demographics ==
At the time of the Russian Empire Census of 1897, Luzhsky Uyezd had a population of 133,466. Of these, 91.7% spoke Russian, 3.6% Estonian, 1.3% Latvian, 0.8% Finnish, 0.7% Polish, 0.7% German, 0.5% Ingrian, 0.4% Yiddish, 0.1% Belarusian, 0.1% Romani and 0.1% Lithuanian as their native language.

== Notable people ==
- Theophan (Bystrov) (1875), ascetic archbishop
