= Naziya (inhabited locality) =

Naziya (Russian: Назия) is the name of several inhabited localities in Kirovsky District of Leningrad Oblast, Russia.

Urban localities

- Naziya, an urban-type settlement under the administrative jurisdiction of Naziyevskoye Settlement Municipal Formation

Rural localities

- Naziya, Putilovskoye Settlement Municipal Formation, Kirovsky District, Leningrad Oblast, a settlement of the crossing in Putilovskoye Settlement Municipal Formation
- Naziya, Priladozhskoye Settlement Municipal Formation, Kirovsky District, Leningrad Oblast, a village under the administrative jurisdiction of Priladozhskoye Settlement Municipal Formation
