= Zamoshye =

Zamoshye (Russian: Замошье) is the name of several rural localities in Russia.

== Leningrad Oblast ==
As of 2010, six rural localities in Leningrad Oblast bear this name:

- Zamoshye, Boksitogorsky District, Leningrad Oblast, a village in Samoylovskoye Settlement Municipal Formation of Boksitogorsky District
- Zamoshye, Kirovsky District, Leningrad Oblast, a village under the administrative jurisdiction of Naziyevskoye Settlement Municipal Formation of Kirovsky District
- Zamoshye, Osminskoye Settlement Municipal Formation, Luzhsky District, Leningrad Oblast, a village in Osminskoye Settlement Municipal Formation of Luzhsky District
- Zamoshye, Zaklinskoye Settlement Municipal Formation, Luzhsky District, Leningrad Oblast, a village in Zaklinskoye Settlement Municipal Formation of Luzhsky District
- Zamoshye, Slantsevsky District, Leningrad Oblast, a village in Staropolskoye Settlement Municipal Formation of Slantsevsky District
- Zamoshye, Volkhovsky District, Leningrad Oblast, a village in Berezhkovskoye Settlement Municipal Formation of Volkhovsky District

== Moscow Oblast ==
As of 2010, two rural localities in Moscow Oblast bear this name:

- Zamoshye, Mozhaysky District, Moscow Oblast, a village in Poretskoye Rural Settlement of Mozhaysky District
- Zamoshye, Shakhovskoy District, Moscow Oblast, a village in Stepankovskoye Rural Settlement of Shakhovskoy District

== Novgorod Oblast ==
As of 2010, five rural localities in Novgorod Oblast bear this name:

- Zamoshye, Krasnoborskoye Settlement, Kholmsky District, Novgorod Oblast, a village in Krasnoborskoye Settlement of Kholmsky District
- Zamoshye, Morkhovskoye Settlement, Kholmsky District, Novgorod Oblast, a village in Morkhovskoye Settlement of Kholmsky District
- Zamoshye, Lyubytinsky District, Novgorod Oblast, a village under the administrative jurisdiction of the urban-type settlement of Lyubytino in Lyubytinsky District
- Zamoshye, Malovishersky District, Novgorod Oblast, a village in Burginskoye Settlement of Malovishersky District
- Zamoshye, Starorussky District, Novgorod Oblast, a village in Velikoselskoye Settlement of Starorussky District

== Pskov Oblast ==
As of 2010, fifteen rural localities in Pskov Oblast bear this name:

- Zamoshye, Dedovichsky District, Pskov Oblast, a village in Dedovichsky District
- Zamoshye (Yushkinskaya Rural Settlement), Gdovsky District, Pskov Oblast, a village in Gdovsky District; municipally, a part of Yushkinskaya Rural Settlement of that district
- Zamoshye (Samolvovskaya Rural Settlement), Gdovsky District, Pskov Oblast, a village in Gdovsky District; municipally, a part of Samolvovskaya Rural Settlement of that district
- Zamoshye, Loknyansky District, Pskov Oblast, a village in Loknyansky District
- Zamoshye, Nevelsky District, Pskov Oblast, a village in Nevelsky District
- Zamoshye (Kuleyskaya Rural Settlement), Pechorsky District, Pskov Oblast, a village in Pechorsky District; municipally, a part of Kuleyskaya Rural Settlement of that district
- Zamoshye (Lavrovskaya Rural Settlement), Pechorsky District, Pskov Oblast, a village in Pechorsky District; municipally, a part of Lavrovskaya Rural Settlement of that district
- Zamoshye, Plyussky District, Pskov Oblast, a village in Plyussky District
- Zamoshye, Porkhovsky District, Pskov Oblast, a village in Porkhovsky District
- Zamoshye (Toroshinskaya Rural Settlement), Pskovsky District, Pskov Oblast, a village in Pskovsky District; municipally, a part of Toroshinskaya Rural Settlement of that district
- Zamoshye (Krasnoprudskaya Rural Settlement), Pskovsky District, Pskov Oblast, a village in Pskovsky District; municipally, a part of Krasnoprudskaya Rural Settlement of that district
- Zamoshye (Seredkinskaya Rural Settlement), Pskovsky District, Pskov Oblast, a village in Pskovsky District; municipally, a part of Seredkinskaya Rural Settlement of that district
- Zamoshye, Sebezhsky District, Pskov Oblast, a village in Sebezhsky District
- Zamoshye (Maryinskaya Rural Settlement), Strugo-Krasnensky District, Pskov Oblast, a village in Strugo-Krasnensky District; municipally, a part of Maryinskaya Rural Settlement of that district
- Zamoshye (Novoselskaya Rural Settlement), Strugo-Krasnensky District, Pskov Oblast, a village in Strugo-Krasnensky District; municipally, a part of Novoselskaya Rural Settlement of that district

== Smolensk Oblast ==
As of 2010, five rural localities in Smolensk Oblast bear this name:

- Zamoshye, Khislavichsky District, Smolensk Oblast, a village in Kozhukhovichskoye Rural Settlement of Khislavichsky District
- Zamoshye, Novoduginsky District, Smolensk Oblast, a village in Vysokovskoye Rural Settlement of Novoduginsky District
- Zamoshye, Ugransky District, Smolensk Oblast, a village in Znamenskoye Rural Settlement of Ugransky District
- Zamoshye, Velizhsky District, Smolensk Oblast, a village in Budnitskoye Rural Settlement of Velizhsky District
- Zamoshye, Yelninsky District, Smolensk Oblast, a village in Mazovskoye Rural Settlement of Yelninsky District

== Tver Oblast ==
As of 2010, seven rural localities in Tver Oblast bear this name:

- Zamoshye, Andreapolsky District, Tver Oblast, a village in Toropatskoye Rural Settlement of Andreapolsky District
- Zamoshye, Kuvshinovsky District, Tver Oblast, a village in Tysyatskoye Rural Settlement of Kuvshinovsky District
- Zamoshye, Oleninsky District, Tver Oblast, a village in Kholmetskoye Rural Settlement of Oleninsky District
- Zamoshye, Ostashkovsky District, Tver Oblast, a village in Zamoshskoye Rural Settlement of Ostashkovsky District
- Zamoshye, Selizharovsky District, Tver Oblast, a village in Dmitrovskoye Rural Settlement of Selizharovsky District
- Zamoshye (railway crossing loop), Zapadnodvinsky District, Tver Oblast, a railway crossing loop in Zapadnodvinskoye Rural Settlement of Zapadnodvinsky District
- Zamoshye (village), Zapadnodvinsky District, Tver Oblast, a village in Zapadnodvinskoye Rural Settlement of Zapadnodvinsky District

== Vologda Oblast ==
As of 2010, five rural localities in Vologda Oblast bear this name:

- Zamoshye, Babayevsky District, Vologda Oblast, a village in Toropovsky Selsoviet of Babayevsky District
- Zamoshye, Belozersky District, Vologda Oblast, a village in Vizmensky Selsoviet of Belozersky District
- Zamoshye, Sokolsky District, Vologda Oblast, a village in Zamoshsky Selsoviet of Sokolsky District
- Zamoshye, Ust-Kubinsky District, Vologda Oblast, a village in Bogorodsky Selsoviet of Ust-Kubinsky District
- Zamoshye, Vytegorsky District, Vologda Oblast, a village in Ankhimovsky Selsoviet of Vytegorsky District
