= Kirovsky District, Leningrad Oblast =

Kirovsky District Кировский район (Russian)
- District
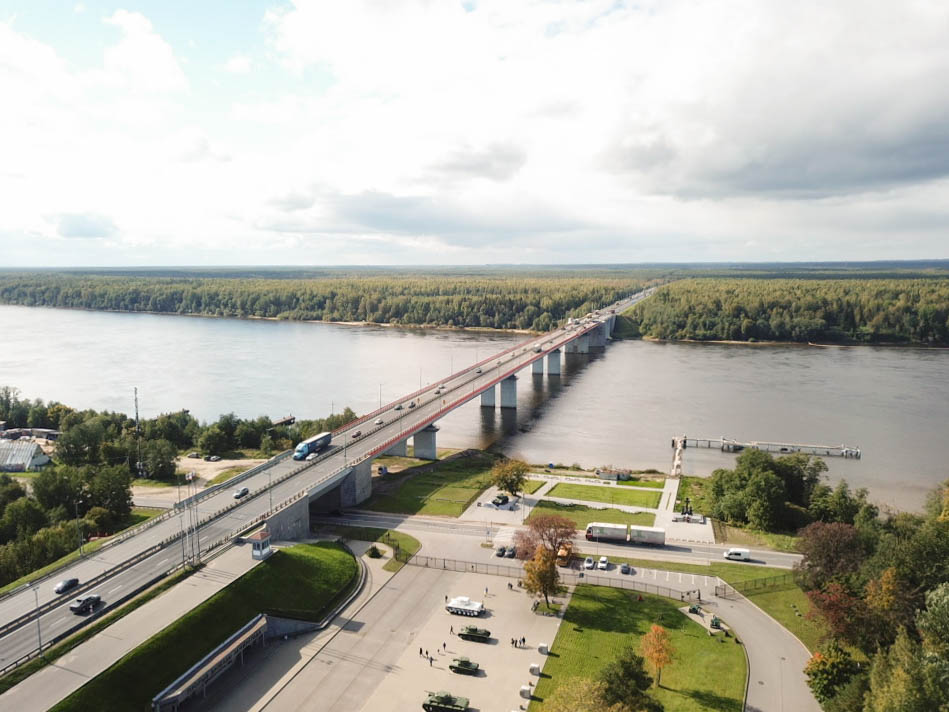

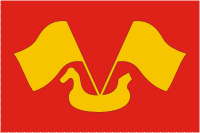
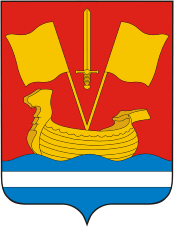
- Flag Coat of arms
- Location of Kirovsky District in Leningrad Oblast
- Coordinates: 59°52′26″N 31°00′15″E
- Country: Russia
- Federal subject: Leningrad Oblast
- Established: April 1, 1977
- Administrative center: Kirovsk

Area
  - Total: 2,590.46 km^{2} (1,000.18 sq mi)

Population (2010 Census)
  - Total: 62,533
  - Density: 24.140/km^{2} (62.522/sq mi)
  - Urban: 82.7%
  - Rural: 17.3%

Administrative structure
  - Administrative divisions: 3 Settlement municipal formations (towns), 5 Settlement municipal formations (urban-type settlements), 3 Settlement municipal formations (rural settlements)
  - Inhabited localities: 3 cities/towns, 5 urban-type settlements, 92 rural localities

Municipal structure
  - Municipally incorporated as: Kirovsky Municipal District
  - Municipal divisions: 8 urban settlements, 3 rural settlements
- Time zone: UTC+3 (MSK)
- OKTMO ID: 41625000
- Website: http://kirovsk-reg.ru/

Kirovsky District (Russian: Ки́ровский райо́н) is an administrative and municipal district (raion), one of the seventeen in Leningrad Oblast, Russia. It is located in the center of the oblast and borders with Volkhovsky District in the east, Kirishsky District in the southeast, Nevsky and Kolpinsky Districts of the federal city of St. Petersburg in the west, Tosnensky District in the southwest, and with Vsevolozhsky District in the northwest. From the north, the district is bounded by Lake Ladoga. The area of the district is 2,590.46 square kilometers (1,000.18 sq mi). Its administrative center is the town of Kirovsk. Population (excluding the administrative center): 62,533 (2010 census); 60,221 (2002 Census); 74,725 (1989 Soviet census).

== Geography ==
The Neva River, which connects Lake Ladoga with the Baltic Sea, serves as the northwestern border of the district. The territory of the district is divided between the drainage basins of the Neva, of Lake Ladoga, and of the Volkhov River, a major tributary of Lake Ladoga. The main rivers inside the district are the Mga and the Tosna (left tributaries of the Neva), the Naziya (a tributary of Lake Ladoga), and the Olomna (a left tributary of the Volkhov). Large areas of the district are covered by swamps. The western part of the district is essentially an urbanized area adjacent to the city of St. Petersburg.

== History ==
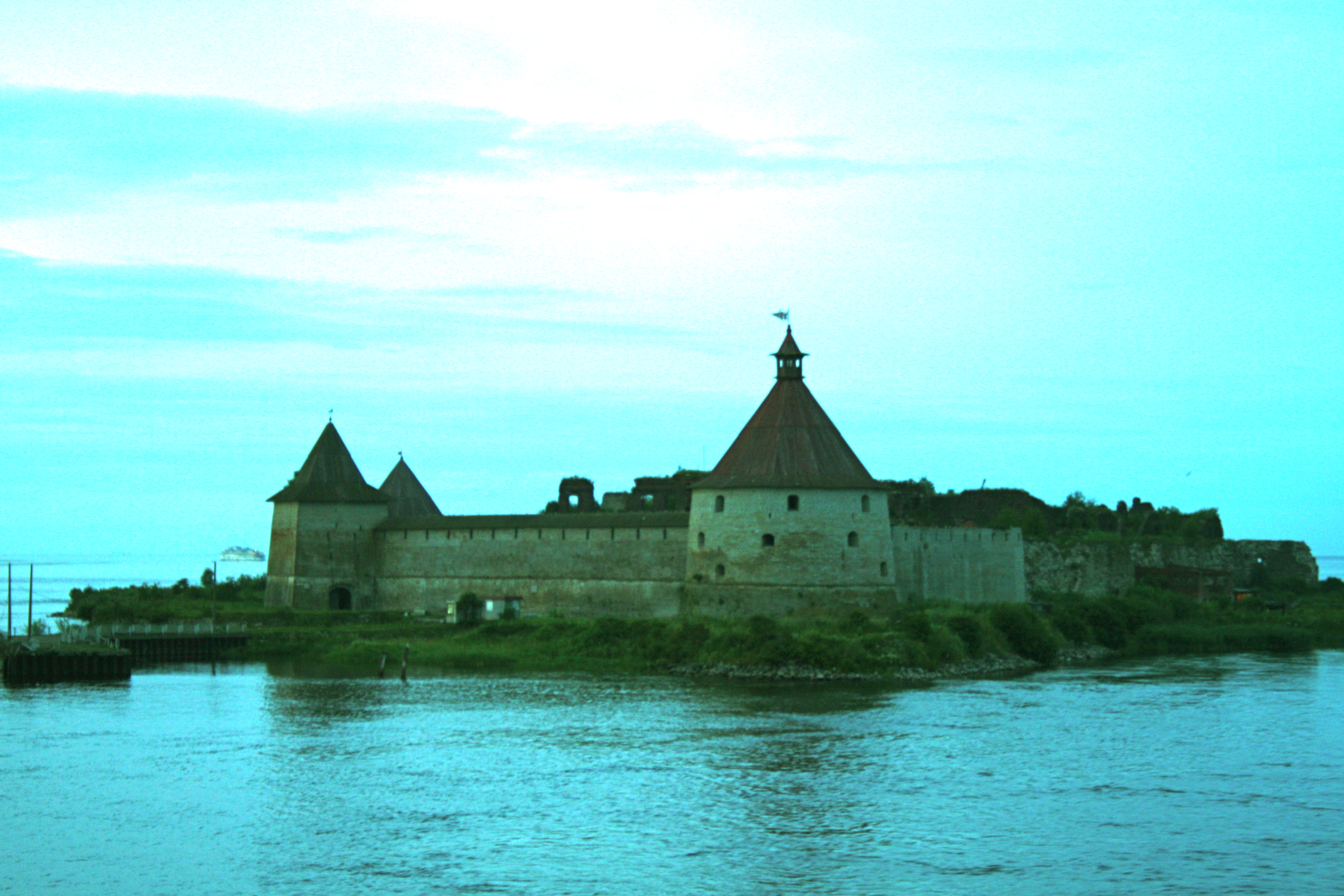
The Oreshek (Shlisselburg) Fortress

Originally, the territory of the modern district was populated by Finnic peoples. From the 9th century, the Neva River was a key ingredient of the trade route from the Varangians to the Greeks, and the region was changing hands between the Novgorod Republic (from the 15th century, the Grand Duchy of Moscow), and Sweden. The fortress of Oreshek, controlling access to the Baltic Sea at the source of the Neva, was founded in the 14th century and rebuilt several times. In 1617, per the terms of the Treaty of Stolbovo, the area was transferred to Sweden, and in the 1700s, during the Great Northern War, it was conquered back by Russia. The city of St. Petersburg was founded in 1703.

In the course of the administrative reform carried out in 1708 by Peter the Great, the area was included into Ingermanland Governorate (known since 1710 as Saint Petersburg Governorate). In 1727, it became a part of Sankt-Peterburgsky Uyezd, and in 1755, Shlisselburgsky Uyezd was established. In 1914, Sankt-Peterburgsky Uyezd was renamed Petrogradsky. On February 14, 1923, Shlisselburgsky Uyezd was merged into Petrogradsky Uyezd. In January 1924, the uyezd was renamed Leningradsky. The eastern part of the district in 1708 was included into Ladozhsky Uyezd with the seat in Staraya Ladoga. In 1727, separate Novgorod Governorate was split off, the uyezd was transformed into Novoladozhsky Uyezd, and the seat was moved to Novaya Ladoga. In 1776, the area was transferred to Novgorod Viceroyalty and in 1781, it was moved back to Saint Petersburg Governorate. On December 9, 1922, the administrative center of the uyezd was moved to the selo of Gostinopolye, which was renamed Volkhov and was granted town status. The uyezd was renamed Volkhovsky. In 1924, the changes were rolled back, the administrative center moved to Novaya Ladoga, and Volkhov was demoted back to a rural locality and eventually renamed Gostinopolye. The name of the uyezd remained Volkhovsky. Saint Petersburg Governorate was renamed twice, first Petrograd Governorate and subsequently Leningrad Governorate.

On August 1, 1927, the uyezds were abolished and Mginsky District, with the administrative center in the settlement of Mga, was established. The governorates were also abolished and the district became a part of Leningrad Okrug of Leningrad Oblast. It included parts of former Volkhovsky and Leningradsky Uyezds. On July 23, 1930, the okrugs were abolished as well and the districts were directly subordinated to the oblast. On September 20, 1930, the administrative center of the district was transferred to the selo of Putilovo and the district was renamed Putilovsky. On September 20, 1931, the administrative center of the district was moved back to Mga and the district's old name of Mginsky was restored. During World War II, between September 1941 and January 1944, parts of the district were occupied by German troops. On December 9, 1960, Mginsky District was abolished and split between Volkhovsky and Tosnensky Districts.

On November 5, 1953, the settlement of Imeni Kirova was renamed Kirovsk and granted town status. In 1965, it became a town of oblast significance. On April 1, 1977, Kirovsky District with the administrative center in Kirovsk, essentially within the limits of former Mginsky District, was established by splitting off Volkhovsky and Tosnensky Districts. In 2010, the administrative division of Leningrad Oblast was harmonized with the municipal division and Kirovsk became a town of district significance.

== Economy ==
=== Industry ===
There are enterprises of construction, chemical, timber, and food industries, as well as manufacturers of electrotechnical and electronic equipment, and a shipyard. These enterprises are located in the towns of Kirovsk, Otradnoye, and Shlisselburg, as well as in the urban-type settlements of Mga, Naziya, Pavlovo, Priladozhsky, and Sinyavino.

=== Agriculture ===
As of 2012, there were eleven large-scale farms in the district, thirty mid-scale farms, and eleven fish breeding farms. The main agricultural specializations were meat and milk production, poultry production, as well as growing of crops and vegetables.

=== Transportation ===
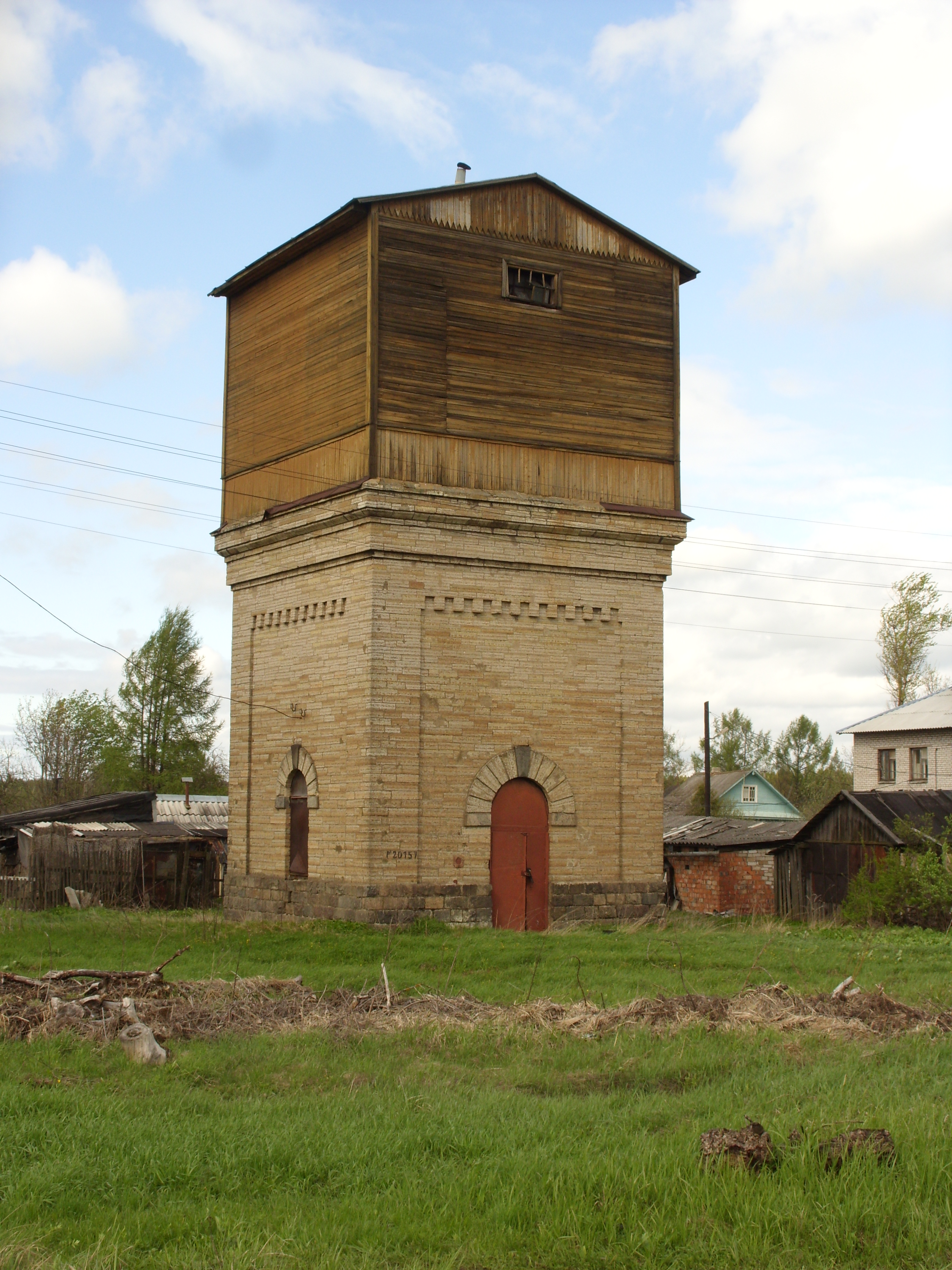
The water tower at Voybokalo railway station

Mga is an important railway hub where three railway lines intersect: one proceeds west to St. Petersburg via Otradnoye (Pella railway station), with connections north to Shlisselburg and south to Sablino, which is located on the railroad connecting St. Petersburg and Moscow; another one proceeds east to Volkhov where it splits into railways to Murmansk and to Vologda; and yet another railway runs to Kirishi and further to Sonkovo.

The most important roads in the district are a portion of A120 highway, which encircles St. Petersburg and passes Kirovsk, and the M18 highway, which connects St. Petersburg and Murmansk.

Both the Neva River and Lake Ladoga are navigable. In the beginning of the 19th century, a system of canals bypassing Lake Ladoga was built, which at the time was a part of the Mariinsky Water System, connecting the Neva and the Volga Rivers. In particular, the New Ladoga Canal connects the Volkhov and the Neva. It replaced the Old Ladoga Canal, built by Peter the Great, which thus became disused and decayed. The canals collectively are known as the Ladoga Canal.

== Culture and recreation ==
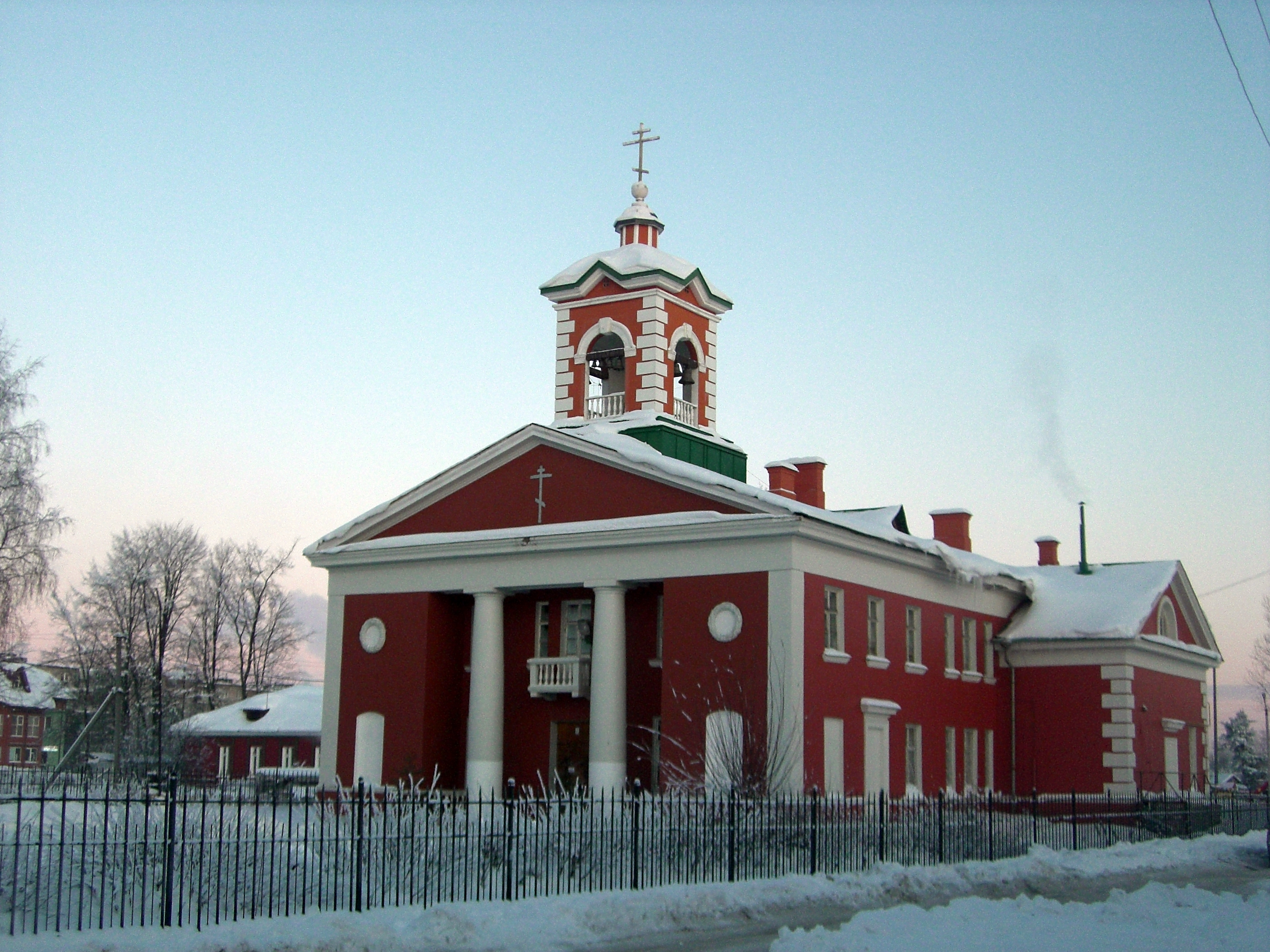
The St. John Church in Otradnoye

The district contains forty-eight cultural heritage monuments of federal significance and additionally seventy-seven objects classified as cultural and historical heritage of local significance. Most of the federal monuments belong to the Shlisselburg Fortress.

There are three state museums in the district. The Museum Reserve "Lifting of the Siege of Leningrad", located in the village of Maryino, is located in the area where the Siege of Leningrad was lifted in 1944 after fierce battles, and commemorates this event. The Shlisselburg fortress was converted into a museum and is currently a major tourist attraction of the district. There is also the Shlisselburg Historical Museum, located in Shlisselburg.
