= Sinyavino, Leningrad Oblast =

Sinyavino Синявино
- Urban-type settlement
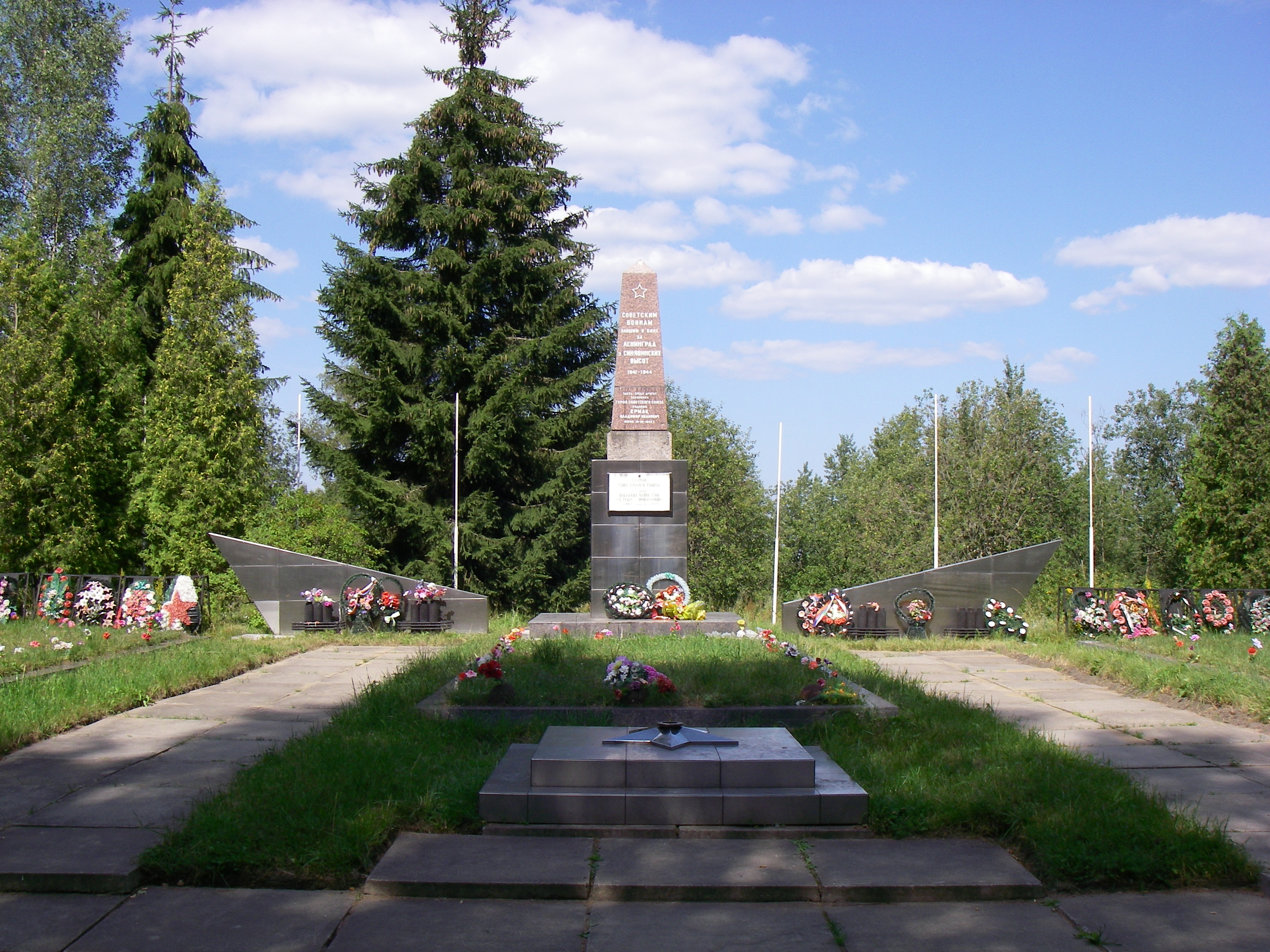

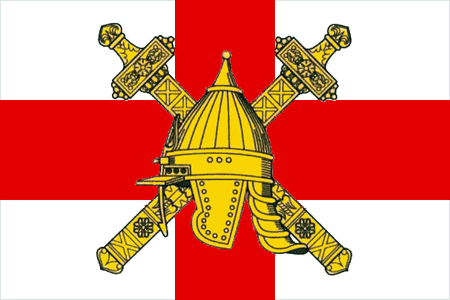
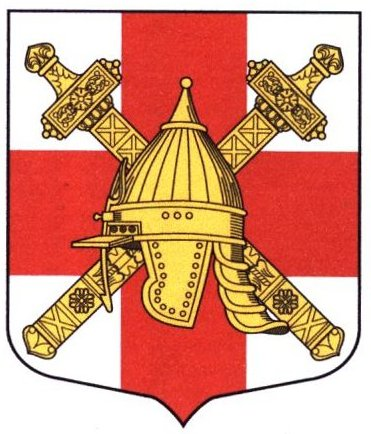
- Flag Coat of arms
- Interactive map of Sinyavino
- Location of Sinyavino Sinyavino (Leningrad Oblast)
- Coordinates: 59°54′N 31°04′E
- Country: Russia
- Federal subject: Leningrad Oblast
- Administrative district: Kirovsky District
- Urban-type settlement status since: April 20, 1930

Population (2010 Census)
  - Total: 3,784
  - Estimate (2024): 4,353 (+15%)

Municipal status
  - Municipal district: Kirovsky Municipal District
  - Urban settlement: Sinyavinskoye Urban Settlement
  - Capital of: Sinyavinskoye Urban Settlement
- Time zone: UTC+3 (MSK)
- Postal code: 187322
- OKTMO ID: 41625163051
- Website: www.lo-sinyavino.ru

Sinyavino (Russian: Синя́вино) is an urban locality (an urban-type settlement) in Kirovsky District of Leningrad Oblast, Russia, located several kilometers inland from the southern shore of Lake Ladoga, 58 kilometers (36 mi) east of St. Petersburg and 8 kilometers (5.0 mi) east from Kirovsk. Municipally it is incorporated as Sinyavinskoye Urban Settlement, one of the eight urban settlements in the district. Population: 3,784 (2010 census); 3,611 (2002 census); 1,949 (1989 Soviet census).

== History ==
The selo of Sinyavino was created in the beginning of the 18th century, when Peter the Great gave the lands in the area to his military officer Naum Senyavin. The selo was destroyed during World War II and never restored, but the name was transferred in the 1920s to the settlement which was serving peat production. The settlement of Sinyavino was at the time located in Leningradsky Uyezd of Leningrad Governorate.

On August 1, 1927, the uyezds were abolished and Mginsky District, with the administrative center in Mga, was established. The governorates were also abolished, and the district was a part of Leningrad Okrug of Leningrad Oblast. On April 20, 1930 Sinyavino was granted urban-type settlement status. On July 23, 1930, the okrugs were abolished as well, and the districts were directly subordinated to the oblast. On September 20, 1930, the administrative center of the district was transferred to the selo of Putilovo, and the district renamed Putilovsky. On September 20, 1931 the district center was moved back to Mga, and the district was renamed back Mginsky. During World War II, Sinyavino was occupied by German troops. In 1942, Sinyavino became the central point of the Sinyavino Offensive, a military operation of the Soviet army with the purpose of relieving the Siege of Leningrad.

On December 9, 1960, Mginsky District was abolished and split between Volkhovsky and Tosnensky Districts. Sinyavino was transferred to Tosnensky District. On April 1, 1977 Kirovsky District with the administrative center in Kirovsk, essentially in the limits of former Mginsky District, was established by splitting off Volkhovsky and Tosnensky Districts.

== Economy ==
=== Industry ===
The economy of Sinyavino is based on food industry.

=== Transportation ===
The M18 highway, which connects Saint Petersburg and Murmansk, runs through Sinyavino. There bus connections with Saint Petersburg and Kirovsk.

In the beginning of the 19th century, a system of canals bypassing Lake Ladoga were built, which at the time were a part of Mariinsky Water System, connecting the Neva and the Volga Rivers. In particular, the New Ladoga Canal connects the Volkhov and the Neva. It replaced the Old Ladoga Canal, built by Peter the Great, which thus became disused and decayed. The canals collectively are known as the Ladoga Canal. Both canals run along the southern shore of Lake Ladoga, north of Sinyavino.

== Culture and recreation ==
Sinyavino contains two cultural heritage monuments classified as cultural and historical heritage of local significance. Both monuments commemorate the events of World War II.

== Notable people ==
- Igor Sinyavin was born in Sinyavino
