= Orekhovy Island =

Island in Lake Ladoga, Russia

Coordinates: 59°57′14.48″N 31°02′18.68″E

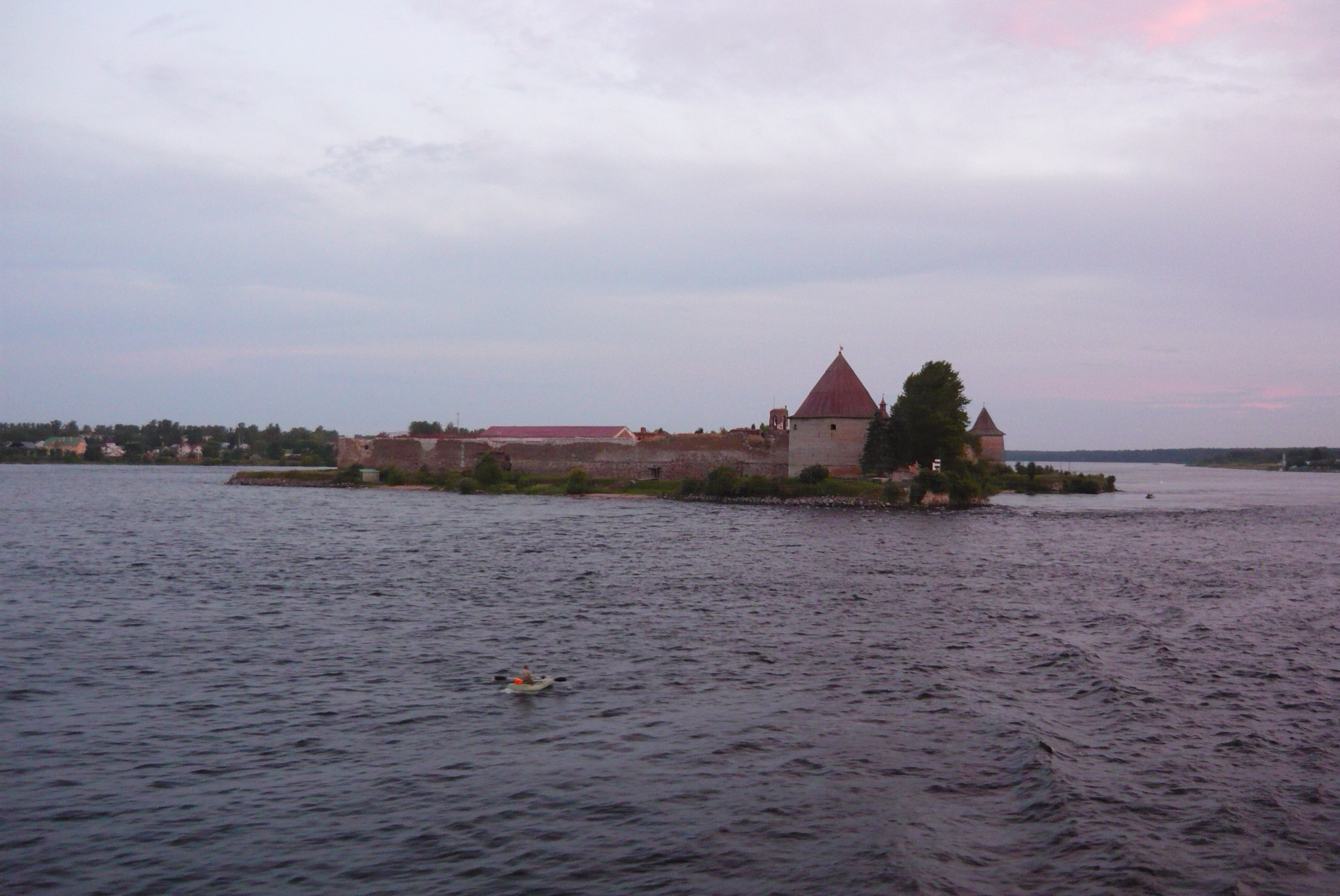
View of the island from Lake Ladoga

Orekhovy Island (Russian: Ореховый остров; Swedish: Nötö; Finnish: Pähkinäsaari) is an island in Russia, situated in Lake Ladoga and located at the confluence of Ladoga and the River Neva, at the town of Shlisselburg in Leningrad Oblast. The island is the site of the medieval Oreshek Fortress, where Sweden and the Novgorod Republic signed the Treaty of Nöteborg in 1323. In Russian, Finnish, and Swedish, the name means 'nut island'.
