= Priladozhsky =

Priladozhsky Приладожский
- Urban-type settlement
- Interactive map of Priladozhsky
- Location of Priladozhsky Priladozhsky (Leningrad Oblast)
- Coordinates: 59°52′30″N 31°19′30″E
- Country: Russia
- Federal subject: Leningrad Oblast
- Administrative district: Kirovsky District
- Founded: 1978
- Urban-type settlement status since: 1981

Population (2010 Census)
  - Total: 5,757
  - Estimate (2024): 5,629 (−2.2%)

Municipal status
  - Municipal district: Kirovsky Municipal District
  - Urban settlement: Priladozhskoye Urban Settlement
  - Capital of: Priladozhskoye Urban Settlement
- Time zone: UTC+3 (MSK)
- Postal code: 187326
- OKTMO ID: 41625160051

Priladozhsky (Russian: Прила́дожский) is an urban locality (an urban-type settlement) in Kirovsky District of Leningrad Oblast, Russia, located 3 kilometres (1.9 mi) from the southern shore of Lake Ladoga, on the left bank of the Naziya River, 10 kilometres (6.2 mi) east of the town of Kirovsk. Municipally, together with the village of Naziya, it is incorporated as Priladozhskoye Urban Settlement, one of the eight urban settlements in the district. Population: 5,757 (2010 census); 5,185 (2002 census); 5,280 (1989 Soviet census).

== History ==
The settlement was founded in 1978 when the construction of the Sinyavinskaya Broiler Farm, at the time the largest broiler farm in Europe, started. On November 19, 1981 it was named Priladozhsky and granted urban-type settlement status.

== Economy ==
=== Industry ===
The biggest industrial enterprise in Priladozhsky is the Sinyavinskaya Broiler Farm.

=== Transportation ===
The M18 highway, which connects Saint Petersburg and Murmansk, runs north of Priladozhsky.

In the beginning of the 19th century, a system of canals bypassing Lake Ladoga were built, which at the time were a part of Mariinsk Canal System, connecting the Neva and the Volga River. In particular, the New Ladoga Canal connects the Volkhov and the Neva. It replaced the Old Ladoga Canal, built by Peter the Great, which thus became disused and decayed. The canals collectively are known as the Ladoga Canal. Both canals run along the southern shore of Lake Ladoga, north of Priladozhsky.

== Culture and recreation ==
Priladozhsky contains four cultural heritage monuments classified as cultural and historical heritage of local significance. They commemorate the events of World War II.
