= Battle of Nöteborg (1656) =

July 1656 naval battle between Russia and Sweden

- Part of the Second Northern War
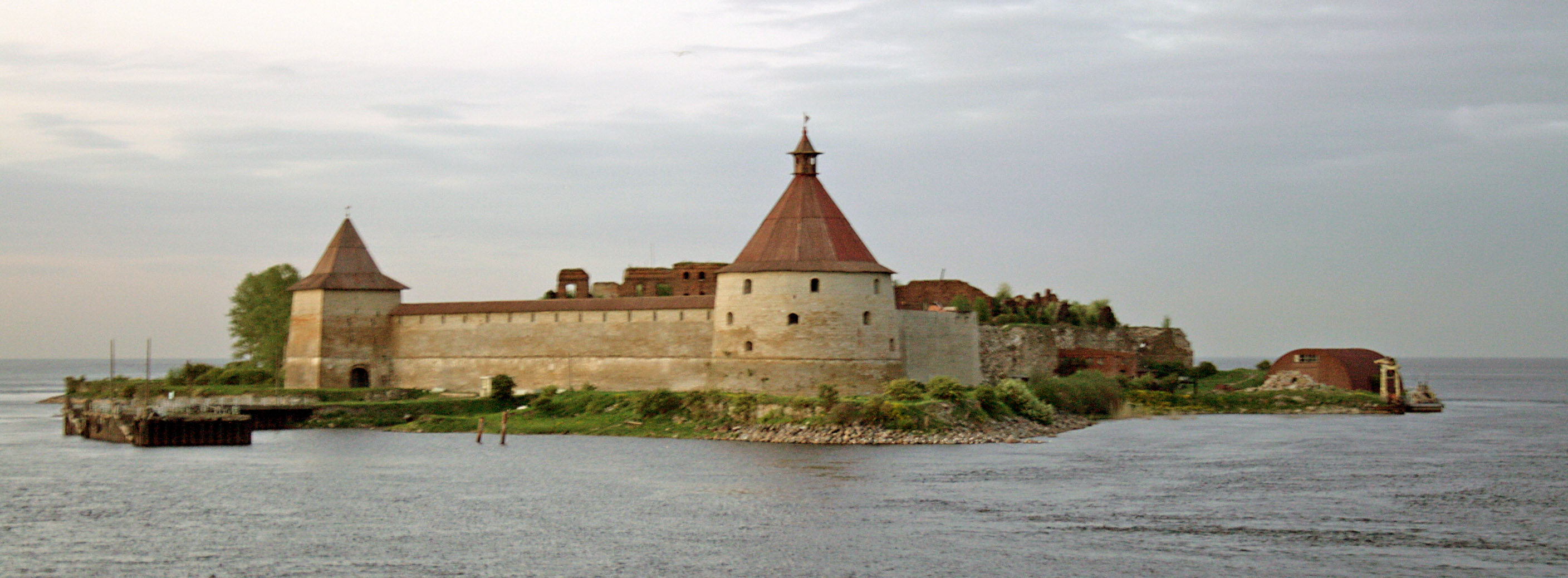
- Oreshek Fortress
Date	July 1656
Location	Nöteborg, Swedish Empire (present-day Shlisselburg, Russia)
Result	Swedish victory

Belligerents
Swedish Empire	Tsardom of Russia

Commanders and leaders
(Swedish Empire) Carl Gustaf Wrangel	Unknown

Strength
50 smaller ships	250 smaller ships

The Battle of Nöteborg in July 1656 was a naval battle between 250 smaller Russian ships, who had surrounded the city of Nöteborg, and 50 smaller Swedish ships under the command of Carl Gustaf Wrangel during the Russo-Swedish War (1656–58). Few details are known, but it was a Swedish victory.
