= Shlisselburg =

Town in Leningrad Oblast, Russia

Shlisselburg Шлиссельбург
- Town
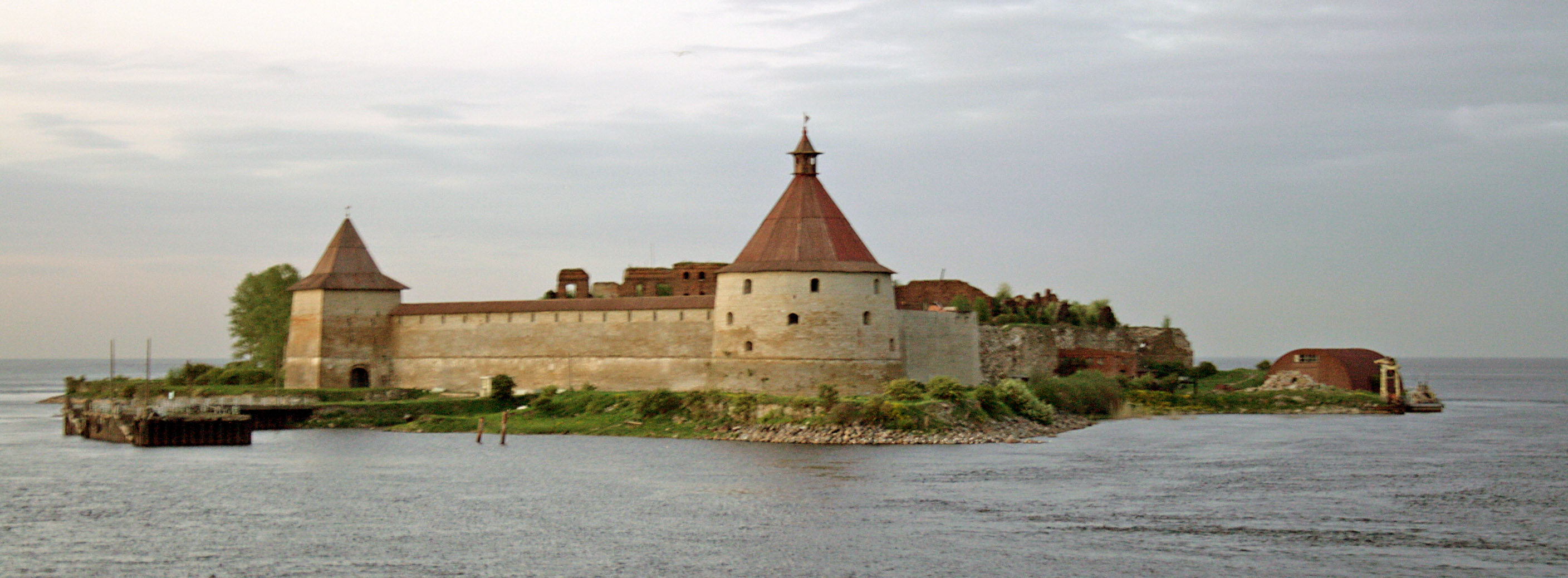
- Shlisselburg Fortress

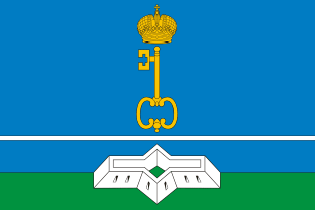
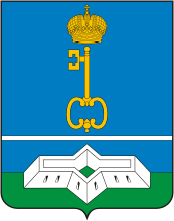
- Flag Coat of arms
- Interactive map of Shlisselburg
- Location of Shlisselburg Shlisselburg (Leningrad Oblast)
- Coordinates: 59°57′13″N 31°2′18″E
- Country: Russia
- Federal subject: Leningrad Oblast
- Administrative district: Kirovsky District
- Settlement municipal formationSelsoviet: Shlisselburgskoye Settlement Municipal Formation
- Founded: 1323
- Town status since: 1780
- Elevation: 15 m (49 ft)

Population (2010 Census)
  - Total: 13,170
  - Estimate (2024): 13,850 (+5.2%)

Administrative status
  - Capital of: Shlisselburgskoye Settlement Municipal Formation

Municipal status
  - Municipal district: Kirovsky Municipal District
  - Urban settlement: Shlisselburgskoye Urban Settlement
  - Capital of: Shlisselburgskoye Urban Settlement
- Time zone: UTC+3 (MSK)
- Postal code: 187320
- OKTMO ID: 41625102001
- Website: moshlisselburg.ru

Shlisselburg, (Note: Russian: Шлиссельбу́рг, IPA: [ʂlʲɪsʲɪlʲˈburk]; German: Schlüsselburg; Finnish: Pähkinälinna; Swedish: Nöteborg.) known as Oreshek (Russian: Орешек) from 1323 to 1611, and Petrokrepost (Russian: Петрокрепость) from 1944 to 1992, is a town in Kirovsky District, Leningrad Oblast, Russia. It is located at the head of the Neva River on Lake Ladoga, 35 kilometers (22 mi) east of St. Petersburg. Population: 14,131 (2021 census); 13,170 (2010 census); 12,401 (2002 census); 12,589 (1989 Soviet census).

Oreshek Fortress and the historic center of Shlisselburg are components of the Historic Centre of Saint Petersburg and Related Groups of Monuments, a UNESCO World Heritage Site.

== History ==
=== Fortress ===
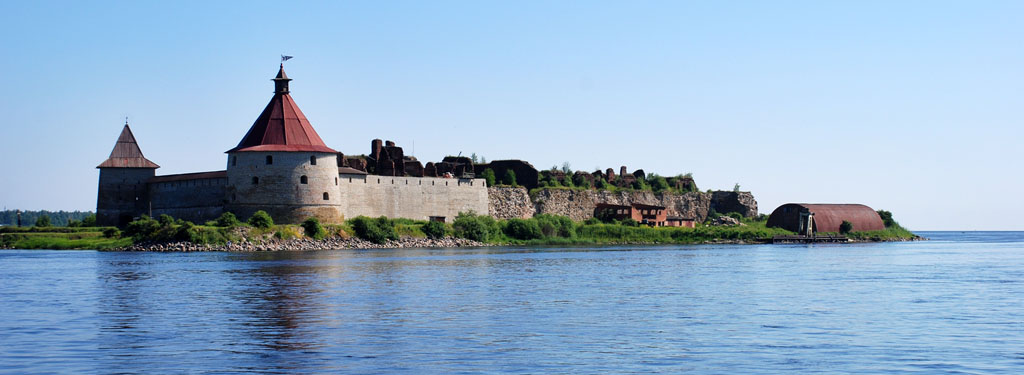
Oreshek Fortress

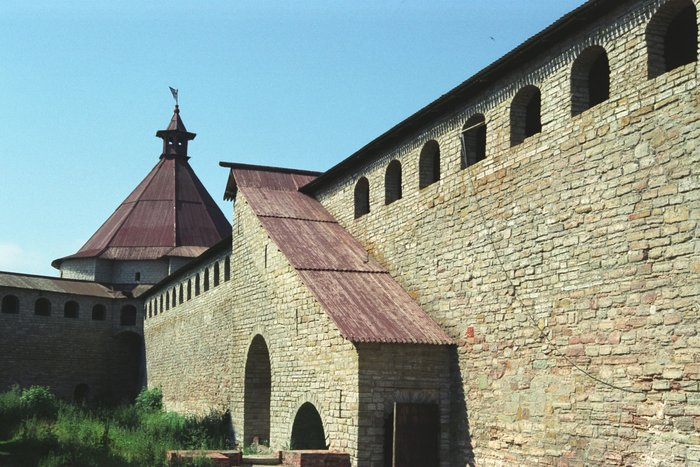
Inside the fortress walls

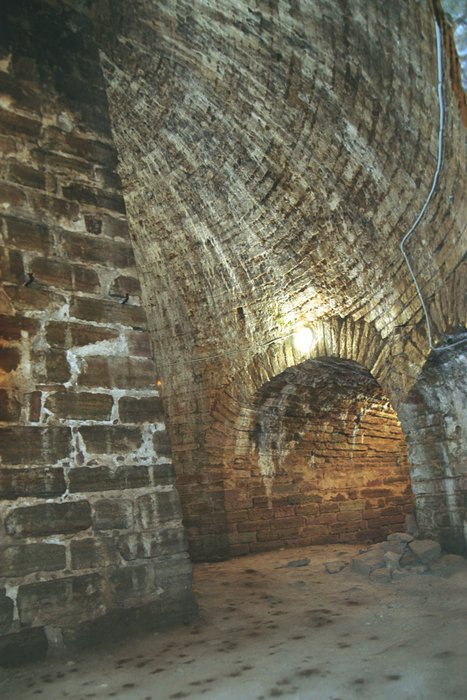
Interior of the dungeon

It was founded in 1323. A wooden fortress named Oreshek, with one tower, was built by Prince Yury of Moscow, who was serving as prince of Novgorod, on behalf of the Novgorod Republic in 1323. The fortress could guard access to and from the lake, as well as movement up and down the river, so it was viewed as vital for protecting Novgorodian and, more broadly, Russian interests.

After a series of conflicts with Sweden, a peace treaty was signed at Oreshek on August 12, 1323, between Prince Yury and the Novgorod Republic on one side and Sweden on the other. Despite the peace treaty, King Magnus Eriksson of Sweden attacked and briefly captured the fortress in 1348 during his campaign in the region. The fortress was largely ruined by the time the Novgorodians retook the fortress in 1351.

The fortress was usually entrusted to princes for its defense. In 1352, a stone fortress with several towers was built on the eastern side of the island under the direction of Archbishop Vasily Kalika of Novgorod. The Novgorod First Chronicle states that "the boyars and the common people of Novgorod petitioned the archbishop of Novgorod, Vladyka Vasilii, to go establish a fort on Orekhov" and that "he went and established the fort (kostry) and returned to Novgorod". The Novgorod Third Chronicle gives a slightly different account, stating that Vasily blessed the endeavour but did not personally oversee the project.

A posad (settlement) emerged on the western side of the island and was enclosed with a stone wall in 1410. Between 1514 and 1525, the fortress was rebuilt; instead of its previous rectangular shape, it became polygonal and had seven outer towers and an inner three-towered citadel. Unfortified posady emerged along the river banks.

In 1554–1555, during the Russo-Swedish War, the Swedes laid siege to the fortress, without success. The fortress withstood subsequent sieges by the Swedes in 1579, 1582, and 1611. However, during the Time of Troubles, it was captured by Swedish forces in 1611 after a prolonged siege. It became the center of a fief in Swedish Ingria, and, under the Treaty of Stolbovo (1617), remained part of Sweden. The fortress was subsequently repaired in 1619–1641 and 1686–1697.

In 1656, during the Russo-Swedish War of 1656–1658, the Russians besieged the fortress under the command of Pyotr Potemkin but were unsuccessful. However, on 11 October [N.S. 22 October] 1702, during the Great Northern War, Russian forces under the command of Peter I were able to capture it following a siege. An amphibious assault was launched, and the 440 Swedish soldiers defending the fortress surrendered after ten days.

Peter renamed the fortress Shlisselburg, an adaptation of the German name Schlüsselburg into Russian. The name, meaning 'key-fortress', reflected Peter's perception of the fortress as the "key to Ingria". It developed on the site of a former posad on the left bank of the river. From the early 18th to the early 20th centuries, the fortress served as Russia's main political prison. The fortress's artillery armament was removed in 1812. A new prison was built within the fortress in 1881–1883, and a central penal facility was established there in 1907 and completed in 1911. Following the February Revolution in 1917, all prisoners were released.

During World War II, shortly before Shlisselburg was occupied by German forces on 8 September 1941, a garrison of 350 Red Army soldiers was sent to the fortress on Orekhovy Island to bring supplies and munitions to the frontline. The garrison held the abandoned castle for 500 days preventing the Germans from landing there and cutting the last transit route from Leningrad to the mainland. Heavy artillery fire by the Germans destroyed all the buildings inside the fortress and part of the outer towers and walls, but despite numerous attempts the fortress was not captured. During Operation Iskra, on 18 January 1943, the siege of the fortress was lifted.

The war completely devastated the fortress. Of the original ten towers, the fortress retains only six (five Russian and one Swedish). Renovation of the walls and towers has been slow, although it is still underway. A stone monument in memory of the first Russo-Swedish peace treaty (1323) has been placed inside the fortress.

Tourists can reach the island from May to October via Shlisselburg, or from the Northern bank of Neva, via Petrokrepost railway station with regular ferries that run every 10–15 minutes.

=== Town ===
A predecessor of the town was a posad that first appeared around the citadel on the island and in the late 15th–early 16th century shifted to both banks of the Neva. Once the Muscovites rebuilt the old citadel into a powerful stronghold leaving no place for residential purposes, residents and merchants were only allowed to the island to seek shelter from advancing Swedish troops. A posad on the southern bank was more convenient for its population, unlike for those living on the northern coast, it was easier to flee the enemies to the southeast, into the Russian mainland. The southern posad of Oreshek was turned into a town in 1702 by Peter the Great.

In the course of Peter's administrative reform, Shlisselburg was included in Ingermanland Governorate (known since 1710 as St. Petersburg Governorate). In 1727, it became a part of Sankt-Petersburgsky Uyezd, and in 1755 Shlisselburgsky Uyezd was established. In 1914, Sankt-Peterburgsky Uyezd was renamed Petrogradsky Uyezd.

The Old Ladoga Channel that divides the town into two parts was constructed from 1719 to 1731 to ensure the safety of the vessel traffic along the southern coast of the dangerously turbulent Lake Ladoga. The plan of the channel was worked out by Emperor Peter I himself. In 1826 the channel became too shallow, so numerous locks, including those in the town, were built to maintain the depth of the channel. In 1861 construction of the new channel was begun, which runs between the old one and the lake. The old channel was finally abandoned in 1940, and what remains of it may still be seen in Shlisselburg.

One of the most notorious political prisoners of Shlisselburg fortress was Iustin Zhuk (1887–1919), an anarcho-syndicalist rebel from the Kiev Governorate. During the Russian Revolution he was released from prison and found a job on the gunpowder works of Shlisselburg, where he joined and then headed a commune of pro-Bolshevik workers. Zhuk supported the revolutionary forces in Petrograd and arranged day care for the children of workers as well as sourced food from Ukraine, where he was born. He led a group of Red Guards from Shlisselburg that were dispatched to the Russian-Finnish borderland to halt an intrusion of White Finns towards Petrograd and died in an ambush near Gruzino railway station in 1919. One of the streets in downtown Shlisselburg is named in memory of Zhuk.

On February 14, 1923, Shlisselburgsky Uyezd was merged into Petrogradsky Uyezd. In January 1924, the uyezd was renamed Leningradsky. St. Petersburg Governorate was twice renamed, first Petrograd Governorate and subsequently Leningrad Governorate. On August 1, 1927, the uyezds were abolished. Shlisselburg was made a town of okrug significance and belonged to Leningrad Okrug. On August 19, 1930, Leningradsky Prigorodny District, with the administrative center in Leningrad, was established. On August 19, 1936, the district was abolished and Shlisselburg became the town of oblast significance.

During the Great Patriotic War Shlisselburg was swiftly occupied by the German troops (8 September 1941) that aimed to encircle Leningrad. On 18 January 1943 in the course of Operation Iskra Shlisselburg was retaken by the Red Army. As the railway connection to Leningrad via German-occupied Mga was still unavailable, two temporary railway passages over Neva were rapidly built in Shlisselburg, a temporary railway line over the ice, and shortly afterwards a wooden pile bridge. First train with supplies that went through Shlisselburg arrived in Leningrad on 7 February 1943.

In 1944, the town's name was changed to Petrokrepost (lit. 'Peter's fortress'). Shlisselburg regained its former name in 1992.

In 2010, the administrative structure of Leningrad Oblast was harmonized with its municipal structure, and Shlisselburg became a town of district significance, subordinated to Kirovsky District.

== Administrative and municipal status ==
Within the framework of administrative divisions, it is incorporated within Kirovsky District as Shlisselburgskoye Settlement Municipal Formation. As a municipal division, Shlisselburgskoye Settlement Municipal Formation is incorporated within Kirovsky Municipal District as Shlisselburgskoye Urban Settlement.

== Economy ==
=== Industry ===
There are several shipyards in Shlisselburg.

The main company operating in the city is Nevsky shipyard, which was founded in 1913 when the ship repair workshops were established. The main activities of the company are shipbuilding, ship repair, modernization and renovation and machine-building.

=== Transportation ===
The railway platform of Petrokrepost, which has passenger service to Ladozhsky railway station in St. Petersburg, is located on the other bank of the Neva opposite of Shlisselburg.

The A120 highway, which encircles St. Petersburg, and the M18 Highway, which connects St. Petersburg and Murmansk, pass several kilometers south of the town.

The Neva and Lake Ladoga are navigable. In the beginning of the 19th century, a system of canals bypassing Lake Ladoga was built, which at the time was a part of Mariinsky Water System, connecting the Neva with the Volga River. In particular, the New Ladoga Canal connects the Volkhov and the Neva Rivers. It replaced the Old Ladoga Canal built by Peter the Great, which thus became disused and decayed. The canals collectively are known as the Ladoga Canal. The canals originate from the Neva in Shlisselburg.

== Architecture ==
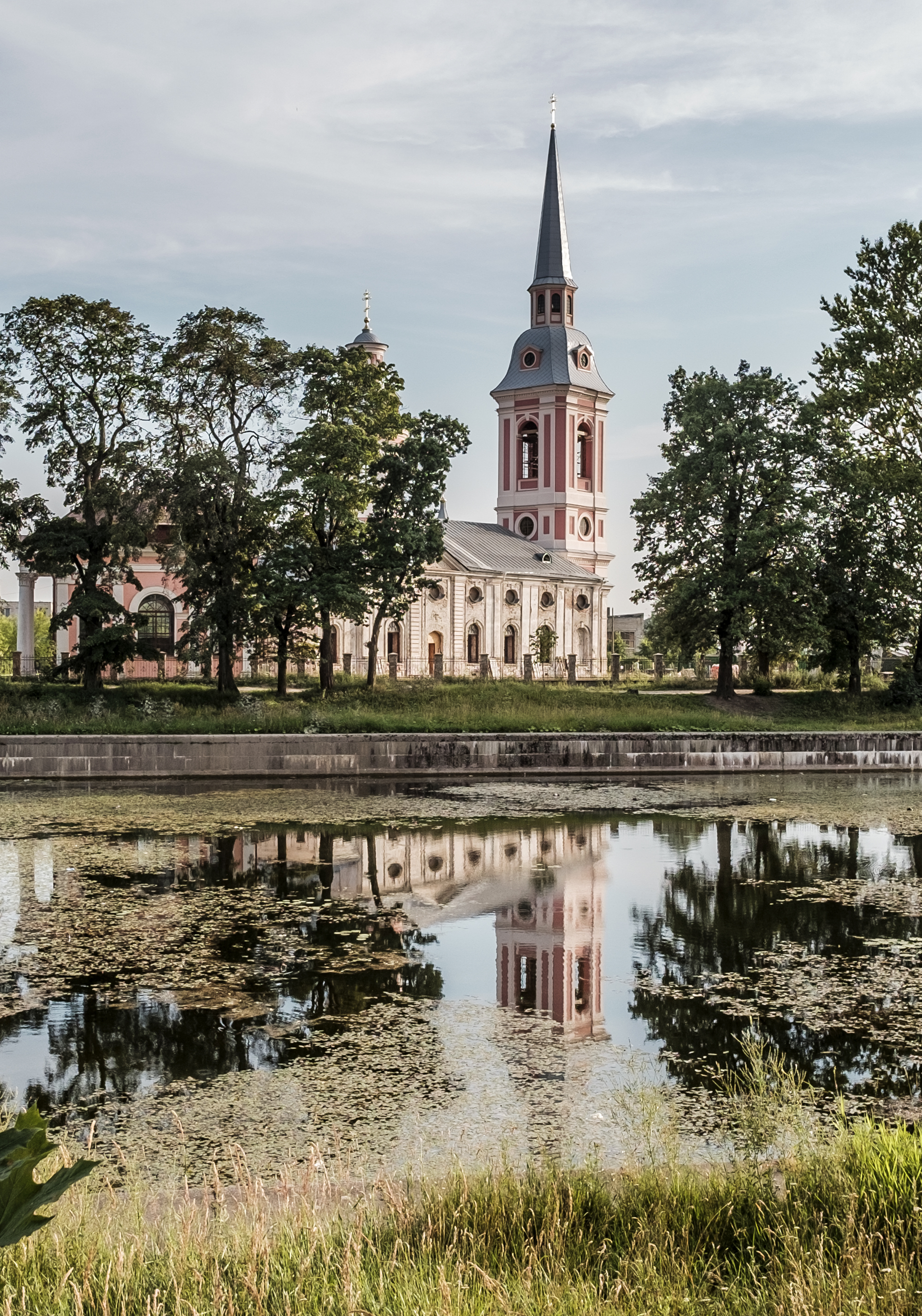
Annunciation Cathedral and Ladoga Canal in Shlisselburg

The town does not retain many historical buildings, apart from a handful of 18th-century churches. Perhaps the most remarkable landmark is the Old Ladoga Canal, started at the behest of Peter the Great in 1719, and completed under the guidance of Fieldmarshal Munnich twelve years later. The canal stretches for 104 versts (111 km); its granite sluices date from 1836.
