= Novaya Ladoga =

Town in Leningrad Oblast, Russia

Novaya Ladoga Новая Ладога
- Town
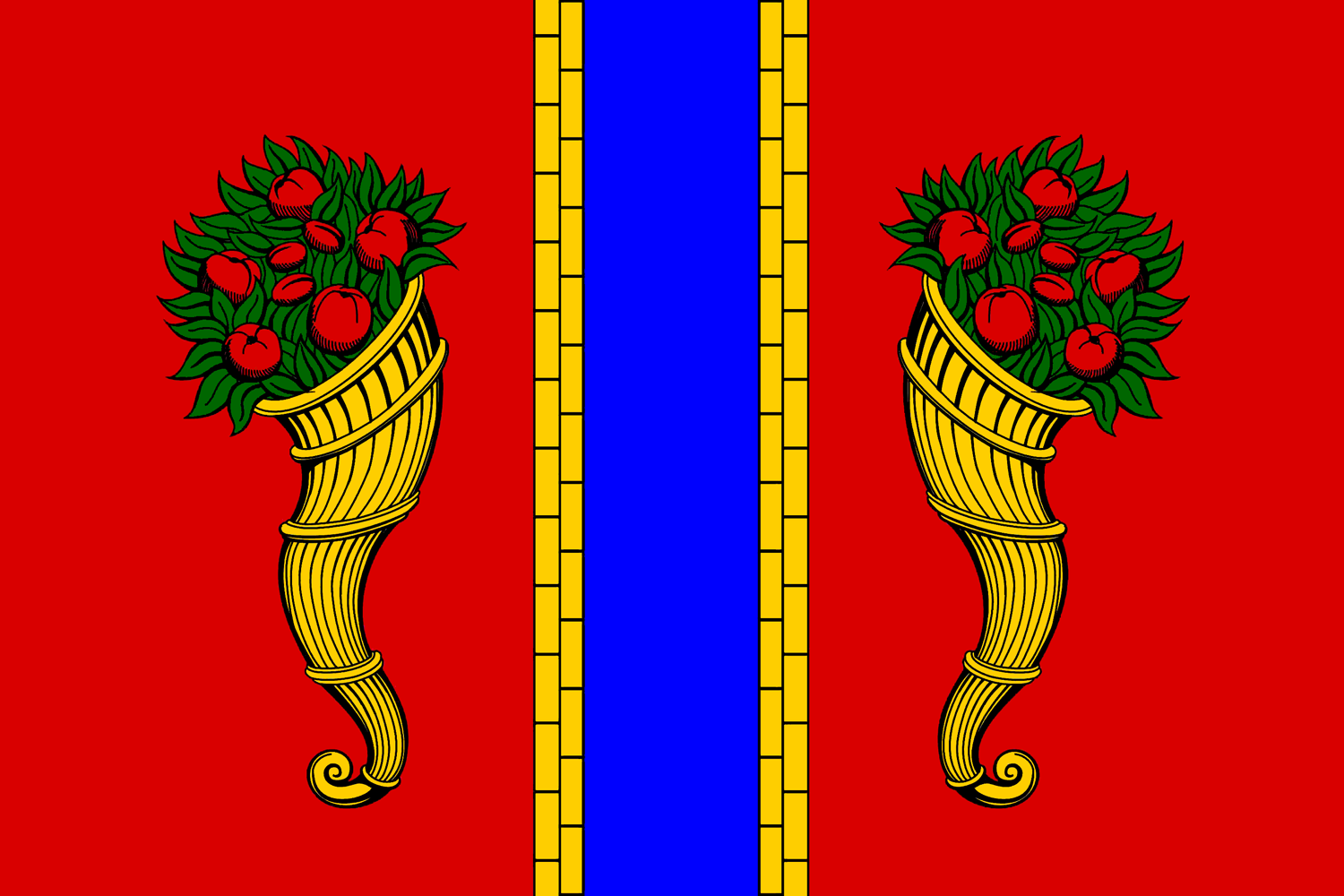
- Flag Coat of arms
- Interactive map of Novaya Ladoga
- Location of Novaya Ladoga Novaya Ladoga (Leningrad Oblast)
- Coordinates: 60°06′N 32°18′E
- Country: Russia
- Federal subject: Leningrad Oblast
- Administrative district: Volkhovsky District
- Settlement municipal formationSelsoviet: Novoladozhskoye Settlement Municipal Formation
- Founded: 15th century
- Town status since: 1704
- Elevation: 144 m (472 ft)

Population (2010 Census)
  - Total: 8,838
  - Estimate (2024): 7,147 (−19.1%)

Administrative status
  - Capital of: Novoladozhskoye Settlement Municipal Formation

Municipal status
  - Municipal district: Volkhovsky Municipal District
  - Urban settlement: Novoladozhskoye Urban Settlement
  - Capital of: Novoladozhskoye Urban Settlement
- Time zone: UTC+3 (MSK)
- Postal codes: 187450, 187453
- OKTMO ID: 41609104001

Novaya Ladoga (Russian: Но́вая Ла́дога, lit. 'New Ladoga') is a town in Volkhovsky District of Leningrad Oblast, Russia, located at the point where the Volkhov River flows into Lake Ladoga, 140 kilometers (87 mi) east of St. Petersburg. Population: 8,838 (2010 census); 9,920 (2002 census); 11,310 (1989 Soviet census).

== History ==
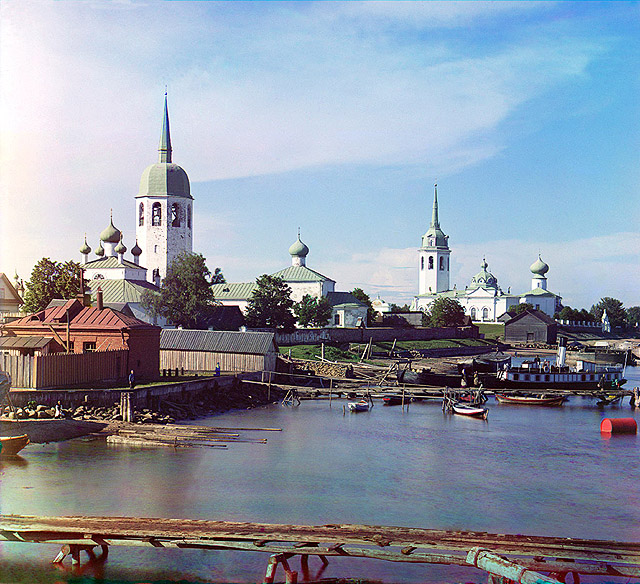
Nikolo-Medvedsky Monastery in Novaya Ladoga (1911 photo)

The Nikolo-Medvedsky (St. Nicholas) Monastery stood on the site of the modern town since the 15th century, but the nearby sloboda was long overshadowed by the first Russian capital, Staraya Ladoga, located just a few miles upstream. In 1702–1704, during the Great Northern War, Peter the Great established a shipyard there, fortified the monastery, and ordered the population of Staraya Ladoga to relocate to the nearby village. Town rights were granted to it in 1704. The newly founded town grew in importance in connection with construction of the Ladoga Canal and Volga–Baltic Waterway in the 18th and 19th centuries.

In 1719, Novaya Ladoga was included to St. Petersburg Governorate. In 1727, separate Novgorod Governorate was split off, and in 1773 Novoladozhsky Uyezd, with its seat in Novaya Ladoga, was established. In 1776, the area was transferred to Novgorod Viceroyalty and in 1781, it was moved back into St. Petersburg Governorate. On December 9, 1922, the administrative center of the uyezd was moved to the selo of Gostinopolye, which was renamed Volkhov and was granted town status. The uyezd was renamed Volkhovsky. In 1924, the changes were rolled back, the administrative center moved to Novaya Ladoga, and Volkhov was demoted to a selo (which was eventually renamed Gostinopolye). The name of the uyezd, however, remained Volkhovsky.

On August 1, 1927, the uyezds were abolished and Volkhovsky District, with the administrative center in the urban-type settlement of Zvanka, was established. The governorates were also abolished and the district became a part of Leningrad Okrug of Leningrad Oblast. On July 23, 1930, the okrugs were abolished as well and the districts were directly subordinated to the oblast.

On March 20, 1946, Novoladozhsky District with the administrative center located in Novaya Ladoga was split off Volkhovsky District. On February 1, 1963, Novoladozhsky District was abolished and merged into Volkhovsky District.

== Administrative and municipal status ==
Within the framework of administrative divisions, it is, together with four rural localities, incorporated within Volkhovsky District as Novoladozhskoye Settlement Municipal Formation. As a municipal division, Novoladozhskoye Settlement Municipal Formation is incorporated within Volkhovsky Municipal District as Novoladozhskoye Urban Settlement.

== Economy ==
=== Industry ===
Industrial facilities in Novaya Ladoga include shipyards and food industry enterprises.

=== Transportation ===
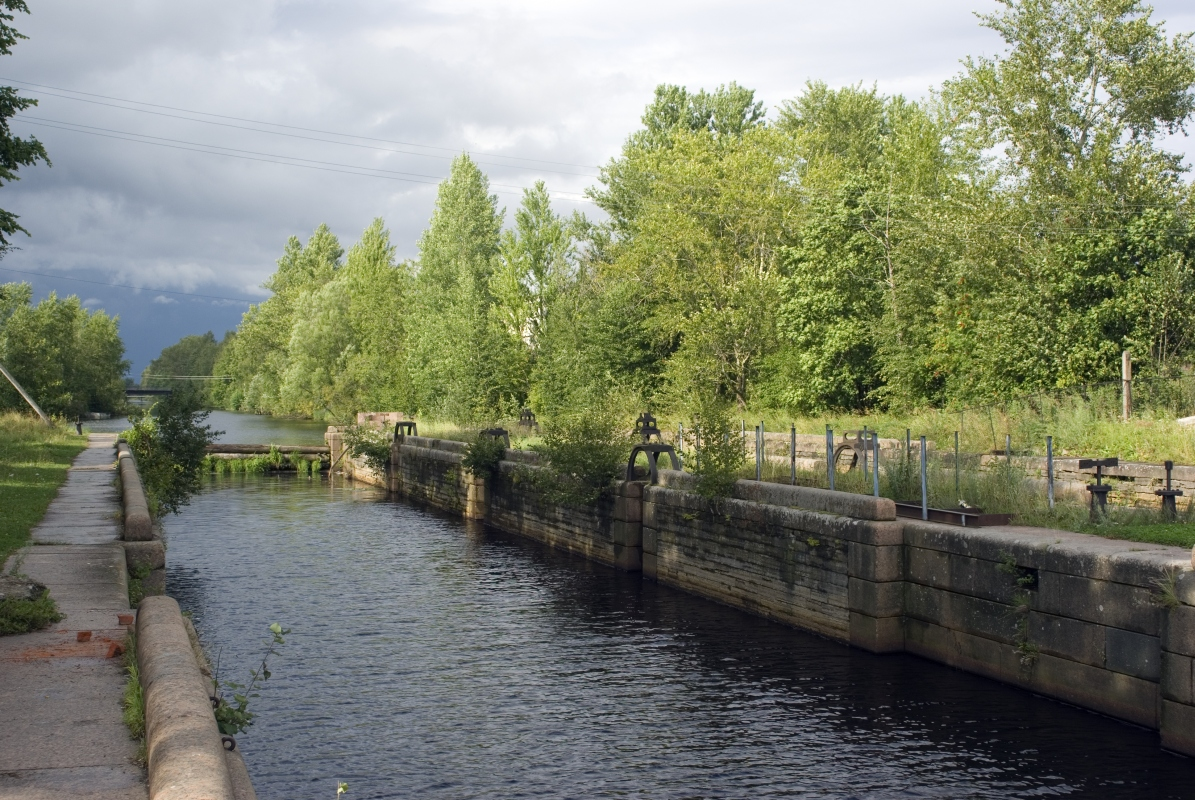
A lock of the disused Old Ladoga Canal in Novaya Ladoga

The M18 Highway, connecting St. Petersburg and Murmansk, passes close to Novaya Ladoga. In Kiselnya, close to Novaya Ladoga, a highway heading to Vologda via Tikhvin and Cherepovets branches off. The town is also connected by a road to Volkhov, with a regular bus traffic.

The Volkhov River is navigable within the district; however, there is no passenger navigation. In the beginning of the 19th century, a system of canals bypassing Lake Ladoga were built, which at the time were a part of Mariinsky Water System, connecting the Neva River and the Volga River. In particular, the Syas Canal connects the Syas and the Volkhov. The New Ladoga Canal connects the Volkhov and the Neva. It replaced the Old Ladoga Canal, built by Peter the Great, which thus became disused and decayed. The canals collectively are known as the Ladoga Canal.

== Culture and recreation ==
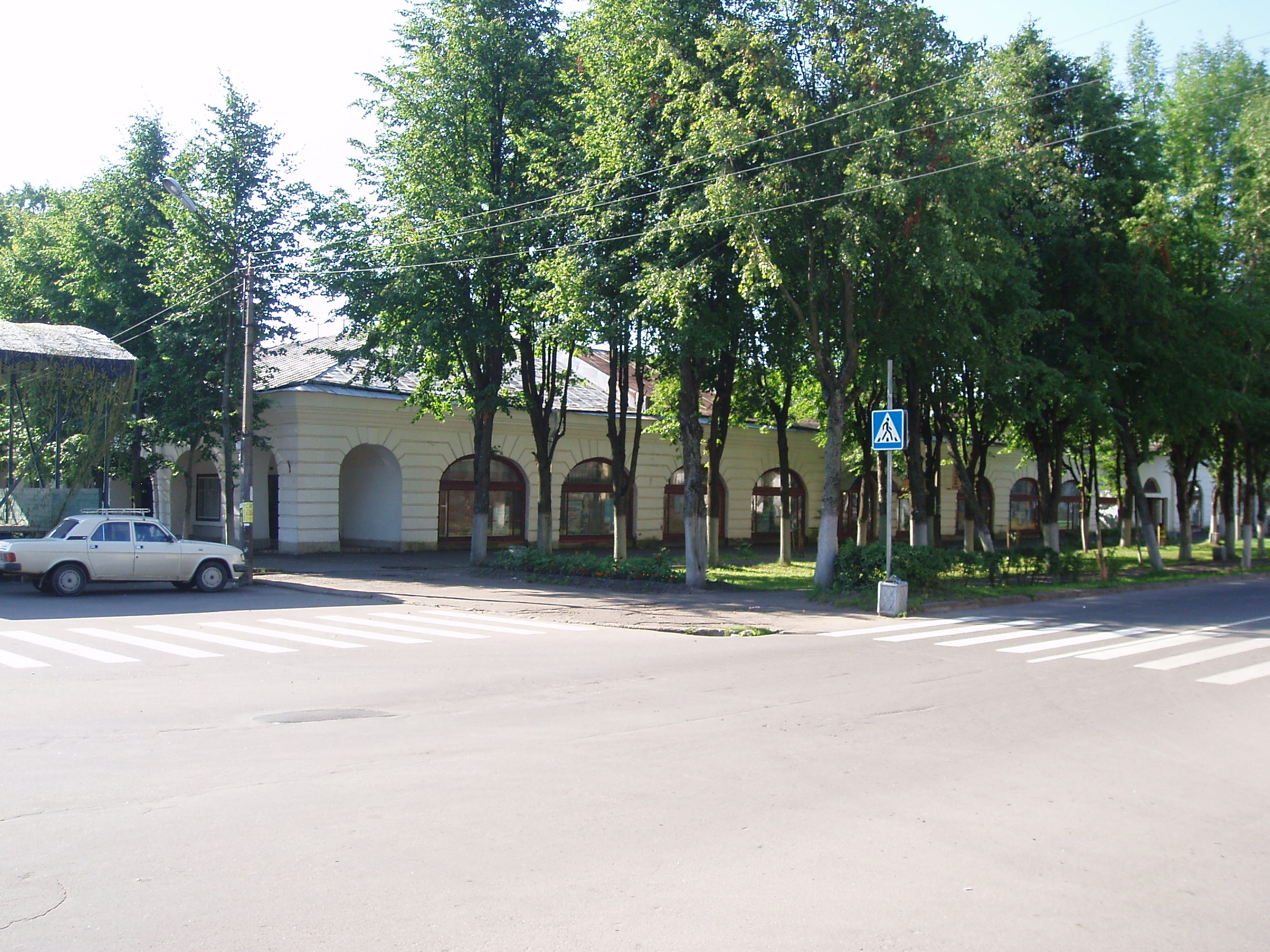
The trading arcades

The district contains seven cultural heritage monuments of federal significance and additionally five objects classified as cultural and historical heritage of local significance. The federal monuments are the trading arcades, the Nikolo-Medvedsky Monastery, the monument erected to commemorate the opening of the Ladoga Canal, as well as two buildings related to the activities of Alexander Suvorov, who was a regiment commander in Novaya Ladoga, and the building hosted the headquarters of the Ladoga Military Flotilla during World War II.
