= Pyotr Leontievich Antonov =

Russian politician (1859–1916)

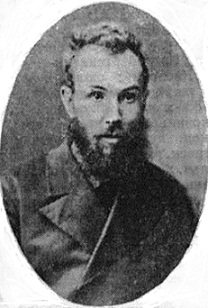

Pyotr Leontievich Antonov (Russian: Пётр Леонтьевич Антонов) (21 December 1859–18 June 1916) was a Ukrainian-Russian revolutionary and terrorist, who survived 20 years imprisonment.

== Career ==
Antonov was born in Mykolaiv (known in Russian as Nikolayev) in Ukraine. His grandparents were serfs. His grandfather was drafted into the Black Sea fleet. As a soldier's son, Pyotr's father was educated in a cantonist school, and worked as a bookbinder. He was made to work from the age of about six, but also received elementary schooling, so was able to read and write.

In 1876, after he had finished school, he attempted to organise a self-education circle for workers. In 1878, he organised a strike in Kharkiv. Later, he was employed as an engineer in the railway workshops in Poltava, where he came into contact with former defendants from the Trial of the 193, and joined Narodnaya Volya, and acted as a propagandist among workers and peasants in the Kharkov and Poltava regions. He was considered to be one of the party's best propagandists, but gave up late in 1882 and joined the South Russian (i.e. Ukrainian) military organisation of Narodnaya Volya, and for nearly three years he was engaged fulltime as a terrorist. In October 1883, he took part in two failed attempts to rob the mail, to raise funds. In January 1884, he killed a suspected police informer named V.Shkriabo. In November 1984, he organised another attempt to rob the mail, during which a postal employee was killed.

In 1885, Antonov was betrayed to the police by a fellow party member named Pyotr Yelko, who had become an informer. When the police raided his flat, they discovered bombs. During his pre-trial detention, he tried to kill himself by slitting his wrists. Tried in May 1887, alongside German Lopatin and other Narodnaya Volya members, he was sentenced to death, but his sentence was commuted to life imprisonment, and he was interned in the Shlisselburg Fortress. He was one of the last 13 prisoners held there when the 1905 revolution broke out, and all 13 were released. He returned to Mykolaiv, and gave up political activity.
