= Oreshek Fortress =

Fortress in Shlisselburg, Russia

Coordinates: 59°57′13″N 31°02′18″E

The Oreshek Fortress (Russian: Крепость Орешек; Schlüsselburg Fortress, Russian: Шлиссельбургская крепость) is one of a series of fortifications built in Oreshek (now known as Shlisselburg) on Orekhovy Island in Lake Ladoga, near the modern city of Saint Petersburg in Russia. The first fortress was built in 1323. It was the scene of many conflicts between Russia and Sweden and changed hands between the two empires. During World War II, it was heavily damaged. Today it is part of the UNESCO World Heritage site Historic Centre of Saint Petersburg and Related Groups of Monuments.

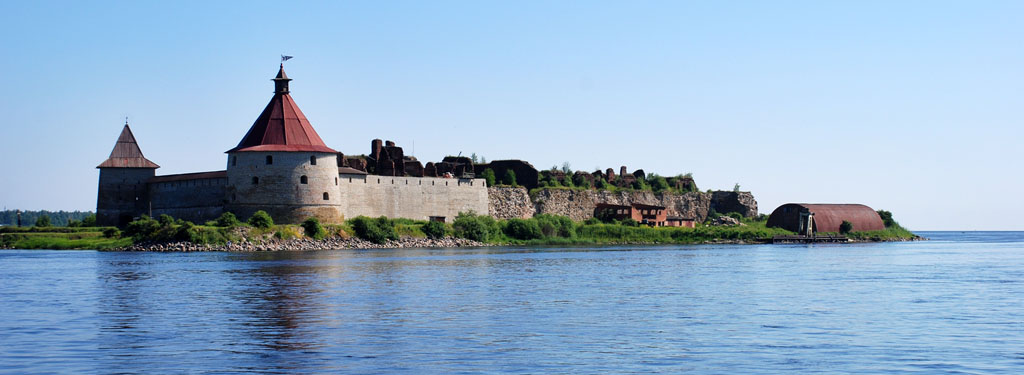
Oreshek Fortress

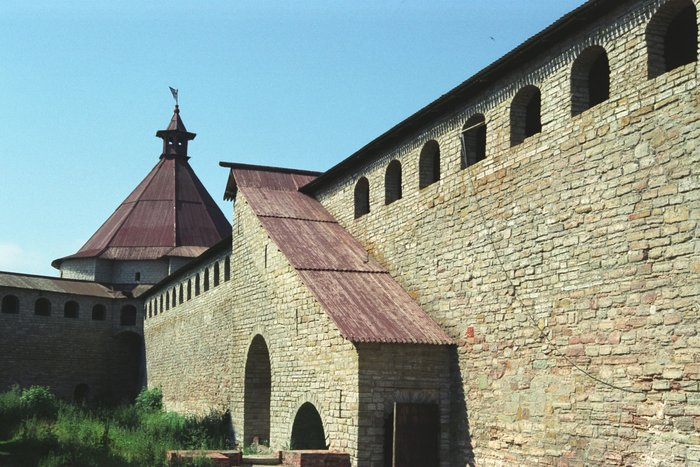
Inside the fortress walls

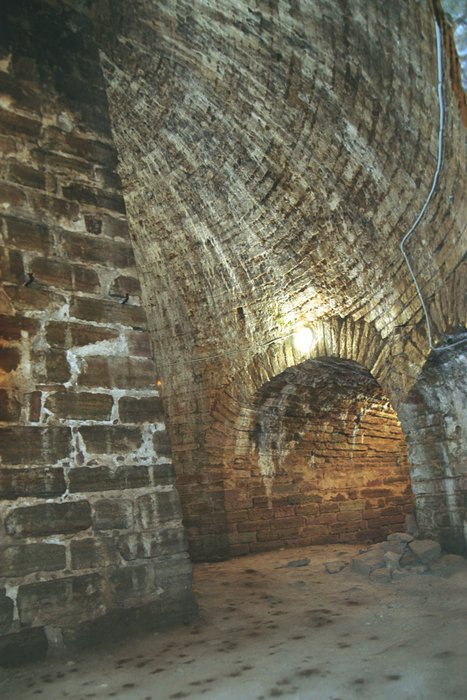
Interior of the dungeon

== Origins ==
A wooden fortress named Oreshek (Орешек) or Orekhov (Орехов) was built by Grand Prince Yury of Moscow (in his capacity as Prince of Novgorod) on behalf of the Novgorod Republic in 1323. It guarded the northern approaches to Novgorod and access to the Baltic Sea. The fortress is situated on Orekhovy Island whose name refers to nuts in Swedish (Nötö) as well as in Finnish (Pähkinäsaari, "Nut Island") and Russian.

After a series of conflicts, a peace treaty was signed at Oreshek on August 12, 1323 between Sweden and Grand Prince Yury and the Novgorod Republic. This was the first agreement on the border between Eastern and Western Christianity running through present-day Finland. A modern stone monument to the north of the Church of St. John in the fortress commemorates the treaty. In 1333, the Novgorodians invited Lithuanian prince Narimantas to govern their north-western domain. Narimantas appointed his son, Alexander Narimuntovich to rule the autonomous principality of Oreshek.

In 1348, Magnus IV of Sweden attacked and briefly took the fortress during his crusade in the region in 1348–1352. It was largely ruined by the time the Novgorodians retook the fortress in 1351. The fortress was rebuilt in stone in 1352, by Archbishop Vasily Kalika of Novgorod (1330–1352), who, according to the Novgorod First Chronicle, was sent by the Novgorodians after several Russian and Lithuanian princes ignored the city's pleas to help them rebuild and defend the fort. The remnants of the walls of 1352 were excavated in 1969, and can be seen just north of the Church of St. John in the center of the present fortress.

== Expansion ==
In 1478, the Novgorod Republic was absorbed by the Muscovy who immediately started to strengthen their border with Sweden. The existing small citadel was demolished and a new stone fortress with seven towers was constructed, which occupied almost the complete island. The old Novgorodian basement was used to construct a new citadel with three towers inside the outer walls. The total length of the walls was about 740 meters. Their height up to 12 meters, and the width at the basement 4.5 meters; The towers were 14–16 meters high and 16 meters in diameter at the basement. This made it the strongest Russian fortress of that period. The residents were forced to resettle on the mainland and most preferred the Southern bank of Neva for safety reasons.

In 1554–1555, during the Russo-Swedish War, the Swedes laid siege to the fortress, with no success. In response, the Russians besieged Vyborg, with no success either.

During the Livonian War in 1582, Swedish troops led by Pontus De La Gardie almost captured the fortress. After a row of artillery fire they managed to break into one of the towers, but were later repelled by the Russians.

The fort was captured by Sweden in 1611 during the Ingrian War after nine months of siege, when the defenders lost every 9 men of 10. As part of the Swedish Empire, the fortress was known as Nöteborg ("Nut-fortress") in Swedish or Pähkinälinna in Finnish, and became the center of the north-Ingrian Nöteborg county (slottslän). During that time very little was done to maintain the fortress in good order, and the experts coming to Nöteborg to do inspections warned the crown of its deterioration.

During the Ingrian campaign of tsar Alexei Mikhailovich in June 1656, the fortress came under a siege by voevoda Pyotr Potemkin, known as the Battle of Nöteborg, which lasted until November 1656 with no success.

== Great Northern War ==
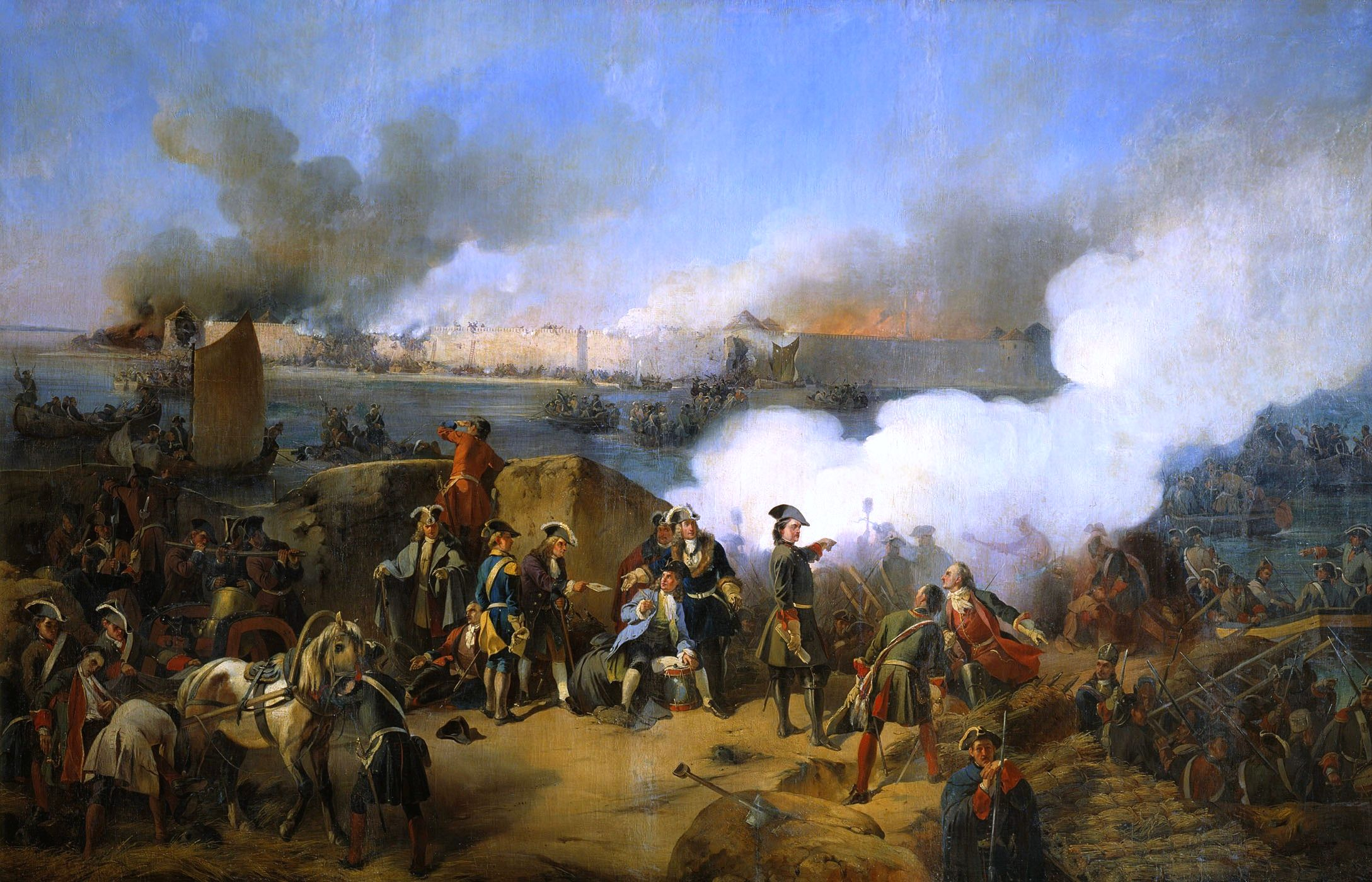
The storm of Swedish fortress of Nöteborg by Russian troops. Czar Peter I is shown in the center. Alexander von Kotzebue, 1846

In 1702, during the Great Northern War, the fortress was taken by the Russians under Peter the Great in an amphibious assault: 440 Swedish soldiers defended the fort for ten days before surrendering. After heavy artillery fire and 13 hours of fighting inside the fortress, the Swedish commandant finally agreed to capitulate on honorable conditions. The Swedes left the fortress with their flags, rifles and four cannons. The Russian forces numbered 12,500 men and sustained a total of 1,500 casualties, compared to 360 for the Swedes.

Peter renamed the fortress to Shlisselburg, a transliteration into the Cyrillic alphabet of Schlüsselburg. The name, meaning "Key-fortress" in German, which refers to Peter's perception of the fortress as the "key to Ingria".

== Political prison ==
During Imperial times the fortress lost its military role and was used as a notorious political prison. The first two prisoners were Peter the Great's sister, Maria Alexeyevna Romanova, and his first wife, Yevdokiya Lopukhina.

The best known prisoner in the Shlisselburg Fortress was Ivan VI, who had inherited the throne as an infant and was interned there until he was murdered by his guards in 1764. After his murder, no more prisoners were sent to the fortress until 1775. In 1800-1870, the fortress held a probable total of 52 political prisoners, including Wilhelm Küchelbecker, and Mikhail Bakunin, most for short periods, though the Polish rebel, Walerian Łukasiński was in solitary confinement there for 38 years.

=== Late Russian Empire ===
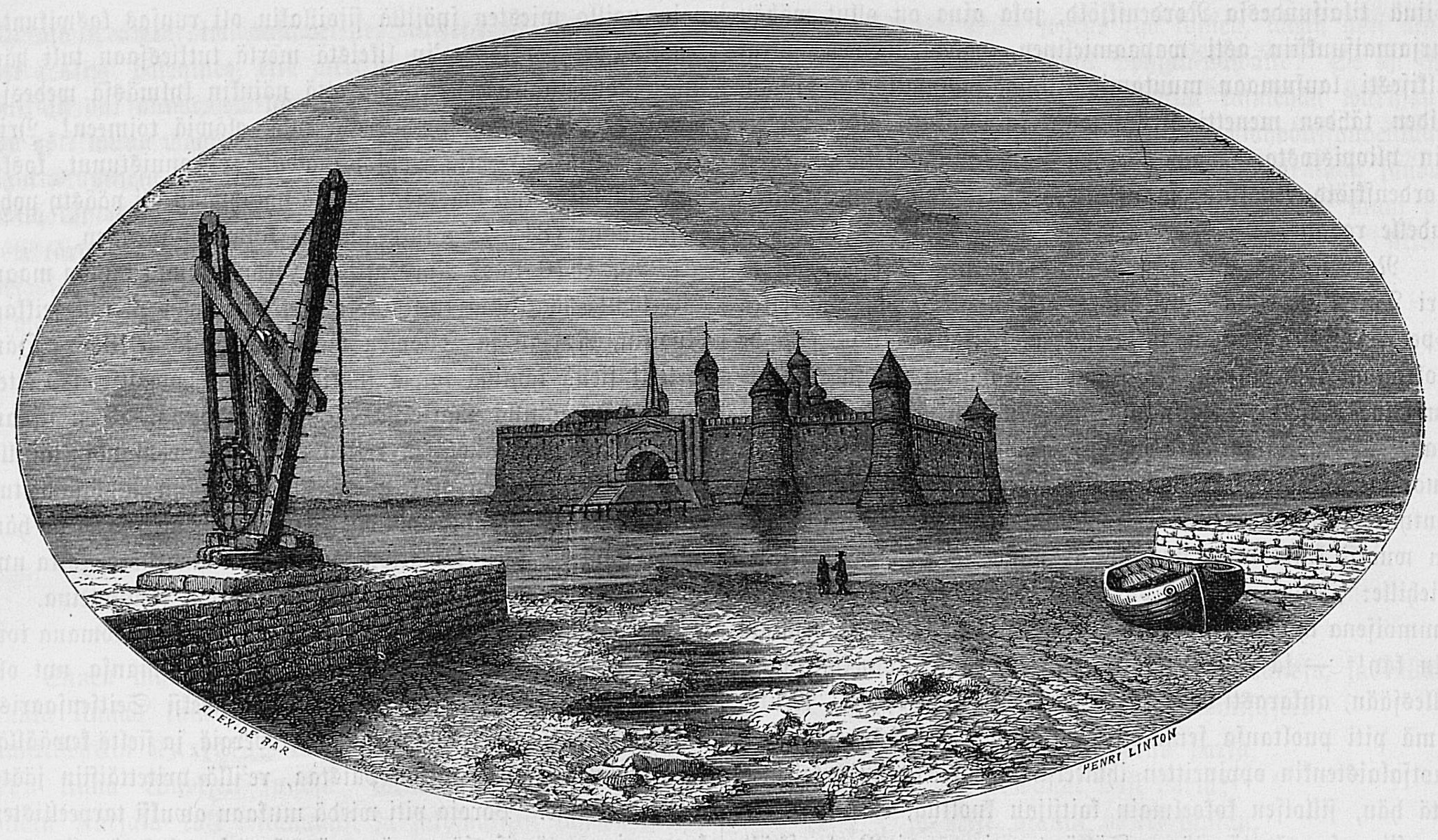
Shlisselburg fortress, 1876

After the assassination of Alexander II in 1881, the authorities decided to invest in a new purpose-built prison in Shlisselburg, containing 40 cells, with ten more cells from the old fortress retained as a punishment block. In 1884, 36 political prisoners were transferred to Shlisselburg from the Peter and Paul Fortress. Most were members of Narodnaya Volya, who had been sentenced to death for conspiring to kill the Tsar, but had had their sentences commuted to life imprisonment. They included two women – Vera Figner and Lyudmila Volkenstein. All were to be denied any kind of contact with the outside world, including visits from or correspondence with relatives.

There were others not linked to Narodnaya Volya, but had been in protests or escape attempts in Siberia. After a riot and a hunger strike in Kara prison in 1882, eight particularly unruly prisoners were transported to the Peter and Paul Fortress, and thence to Shlisselburg.

Lenin's brother, Aleksandr Ulyanov, and four others involved in a plot to kill Alexander III were hanged in the fortress in 1887. So were Nikolai Rogachev and Alexander Shtromberg, whose death sentences, passed at the Trial of the Fourteen, for their involvement in Narodnaya Volya, were not commuted. They were held in the old cells, away from the prisoners.

Ivan Yuvachov, who was also sentenced to death at the Trial of the Fourteen, but whose sentence was commuted, wrote a description of his time in the fortress:

On entering the prison one is struck by the peculiar construction of its interior. Both stories of the building contain about forty cells, the doors of which all lead into one common space in the middle of the building, as into one high hall, reaching from ground to roof, with windows at both ends. So wherever the jailer stands he can at once overlook all the forty cells. Along the upper story runs a narrow balcony, accessible by a winding iron staircase. In order to prevent any attempt on the part of the prisoners to throw themselves over, a closely woven net is stretched along the upper part of the railing.

Lyudmila Volkenstein, who was the first to write a memoir of life in Shlisselburg, was struck on arrival by how clean and new it was:

Our first impression of Shlissel’burg Fortress was even pleasant: clean, dry cells – true, with opaque glass, but quite bright all the same. Fine, clean bed linen; a sink for washing and plumbed water closets.35 The cell was small – seven paces long and five wide – and of the type common to Houses of Preliminary Detention and therefore, perhaps even more pleasant on account of the memory of the last days of ‘freedom’ – of course, relative freedom… The bunks were locked shut, and apart from a bench, there was nothing in the cell.

The prisoners, including both women, were strip-searched on arrival, and then locked in solitary confinement in a small, sparsely furnished cell, where at first they had nothing to read, except a printed declaration on the wall warning that insulting the jailers would be punishable by death. They were told the rules obliged the staff to address prisoners in the second person single, like an adult speaking to a child. Some prisoners communicated by knocking on the pipes, using a simple code, though they risked severe consequences if they were caught. Yuvachov was in solitary confinement for three years before he was allowed to speak to speak a fellow prisoner.

Under these conditions, several either went mad, or became suicidal, or both. Of the eight who were transported from Kara prison, Yegor Minakov was executed after a few months in Shlisselburg, in September 1884, after attacking a prison doctor who he thought was trying to poison him. Another prisoner, named Klimenko, hanged himself around the time that Minakov was executed. Ippolit Myshkin was executed for a similar offence two months later.

After Myshkin's execution, there was a minor loosening of the prison regime when the six prisoners who appeared in the worst health were permitted to take walks in pairs, and therefore to talk to each other. According to Vera Figner, who survived two decades in Shlisselberg, "these walks in pairs were the first breach in our stony grave."

One of the first six granted this privilege was Mikhail Grachevsky, a member of Narodnaya Volya, despite which, he constantly complained about prison conditions. In 1887, he attacked a prison doctor, apparently expecting to be executed, but the prison authorities decided that he was mad and did not punish him, so he used a kerosene lamp to set fire to himself.

Soon after Grachevsky's suicide, Matvei Sokolov, the much hated superintendent of the gendarmes who guarded the prison, whom the inmates nicknamed 'Herod' was replaced, and prisoners were allowed books. Later, they were allowed to tend a garden. This reduced the very high death toll. Thirteen of the 39 prisoners sent to the fortress in 1884-86 died within six years, most from illnesses aggravated by the stress of total confinement.

On 7 January 1891, 28 year old Sofia Ginzburg, who had tried to revive Narodnaya Volya with the intention of assassinating the Tsar, was sent to Shlisselburg after her death sentence had been commuted to life imprisonment. As a new prisoner, she was placed in solitary confinement in the punishment cell in the old fortress, next to Nikolai Schedrin, who had gone insane, and had been moved to a punishment cell where he was raging, making animal noises, and banging on his cell door. After less than six weeks in the fortress, she asked for scissors to cut her nails and used them to slit her throat.

The last political prisoner to be sent to Shlisselburg was Pyotr Karpovich, who shot and killed the Minister of National Enlightenment, Nikolay Bogolepov in 1901.

During the 1905 Revolution, all the political prisoners held in Shlisselburg were freed or removed to other prisons or exile, including several who had been confined there for more than 20 years, such as Vera Figner, Mikhail Frolenko, German Lopatin, Pyotr Antonov and Nikolai Morozov, all once leading members of Narodnaya Volya. According to Yuvachov, the last five prisoners left the fortress on 6 January 1906.

== 20th century ==
In 1928, the fortress was turned into a branch of the Museum of the October Revolution, but in 1939, shortly before the war, it was closed and the exhibits were moved to Leningrad.

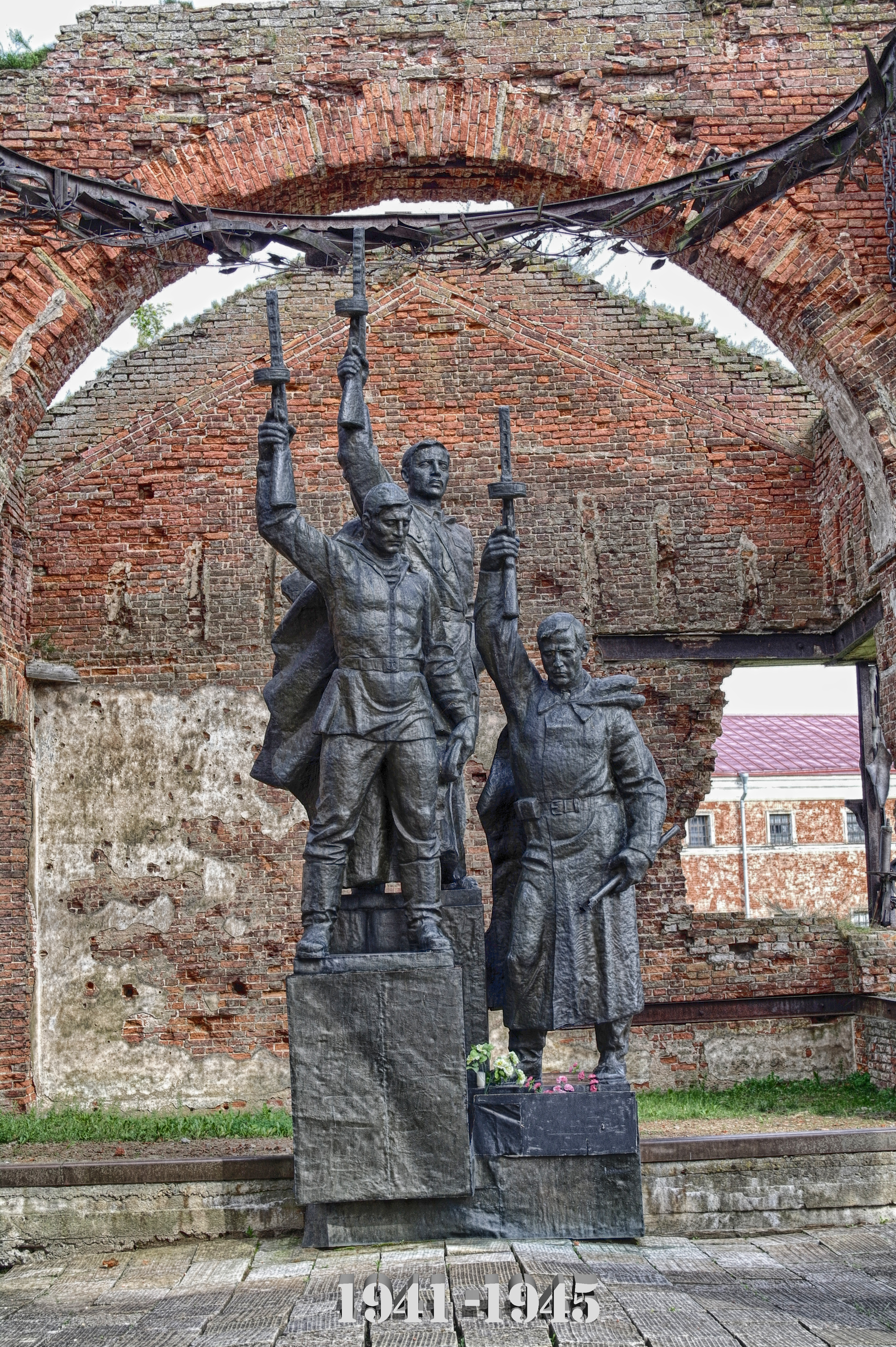
A monument to the defenders of the fortress during World War II in a ruined church

Shortly before Shlisselburg was occupied by the German troops (8 September 1941), a garrison of 350 Red Army soldiers was sent to the fortress on Orekhovets island to bring supplies and munition to the frontline. The garrison held the abandoned castle for 500 days preventing the Germans from landing there and cutting the last transit route from Leningrad to the mainland. Food and supplies were brought from the northern bank of the Neva which remained under Soviet control. Heavy artillery fire by the Germans destroyed all the buildings inside the fortress and part of the outer towers and walls, but despite numerous attempts the fortress was not captured. During Operation Iskra (18 January 1943) the siege of the fortress was lifted.

The war completely devastated the fortress. Out of the original ten towers, the fortress retains only six (five Russian and one Swedish). The remains of a church inside the fortress were transformed into a memorial to the fortress's defenders. An archaeological site was established in the fortress during 1968-1975 that excavated what remained from the ancient Novgorodian stone fort dated 1352 and other artifacts. The fortress has been the site of an annual rock concert since 2003. There is also a museum of political prisoners of the Russian Empire and a small collection of World War II artillery. Renovation of the walls and towers is slow, although still underway. A stone monument in memory of the first Russo-Swedish peace treaty (1323) was placed inside the fortress.

Tourists can reach the island from May to October via Shlisselburg or from the Northern bank of Neva, via Petrokrepost' railway station with regular ferries that run every 10–15 minutes.
