= Naziya =

Naziya Назия
- Urban-type settlement
- Coat of arms
- Interactive map of Naziya
- Location of Naziya Naziya (Leningrad Oblast)
- Coordinates: 59°50′30″N 31°35′0″E
- Country: Russia
- Federal subject: Leningrad Oblast
- Administrative district: Kirovsky District
- Established: 1933
- Urban-type settlement status since: 1933

Population (2010 Census)
  - Total: 4,858
  - Estimate (2024): 6,132 (+26.2%)

Municipal status
  - Municipal district: Kirovsky Municipal District
  - Urban settlement: Naziyevskoye Urban Settlement
  - Capital of: Naziyevskoye Urban Settlement
- Time zone: UTC+3 (MSK)
- Postal code: 187310
- OKTMO ID: 41625156051

Naziya (Russian: Назия) is an urban locality (an urban-type settlement) in Kirovsky District of Leningrad Oblast, Russia, located on the left bank of the Lava River and on the right bank of the Kovra River, east of the town of Kirovsk. Municipally it is incorporated as Naziyevskoye Urban Settlement, one of the eight urban settlements in the district. Population: 4,858 (2010 census); 5,755 (2002 census); 7,712 (1989 Soviet census).

== History ==
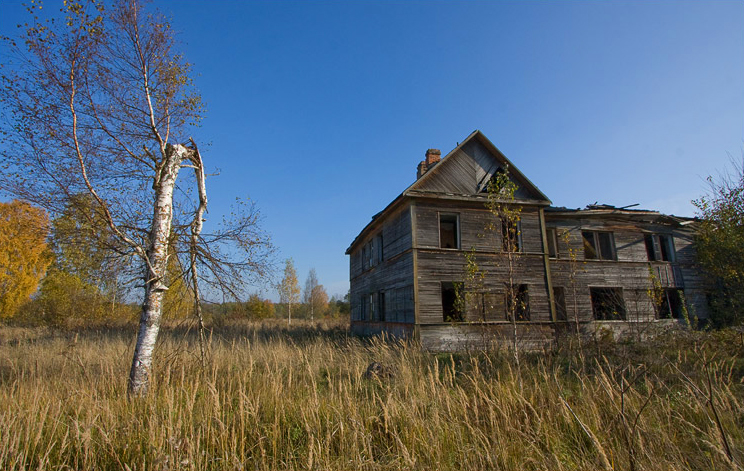
Rabochy Posyolok 3

The settlement of Naziya was established on December 27, 1933 to facilitate the peat production which was carried out in the bogs south of the settlement. From the beginning, Naziya was established as a work settlement and was located close to the railroad station. On December 9, 1960 Mginsky District was abolished, and Naziya moved to Volkhovsky District. On April 1, 1977 Kirovsky District with the administrative center in Kirovsk, essentially in the limits of former Mginsky District, was established by splitting off Volkhovsky and Tosnensky Districts., and Naziya became a part of Kirovsky District.

The settlements in the bogs (Rabochy Posyolok 1–5) which were used for peat extraction works formally belong to Naziya but are currently abandoned.

== Economy ==
=== Industry ===
Industrial enterprises in Naziya include a saw mill and a concrete constructions plant.

=== Transportation ===
Naziya (the railway station of Zhikharevo) is located on the railway connecting Mga and Volkhov. There are direct suburban connections to Moskovsky and Ladozhsky railway stations in Saint Petersburg.

Naziya has an access to the M18 Highway, located several kilometers north of the settlement and connecting Saint Petersburg with Murmansk.

== Culture and recreation ==
Naziya contains five cultural heritage monuments classified as cultural and historical heritage of local significance. All of them commemorate the events of World War II.
