= Ladoga Canal =

Historical water transport route in present-day Leningrad Oblast, Russia

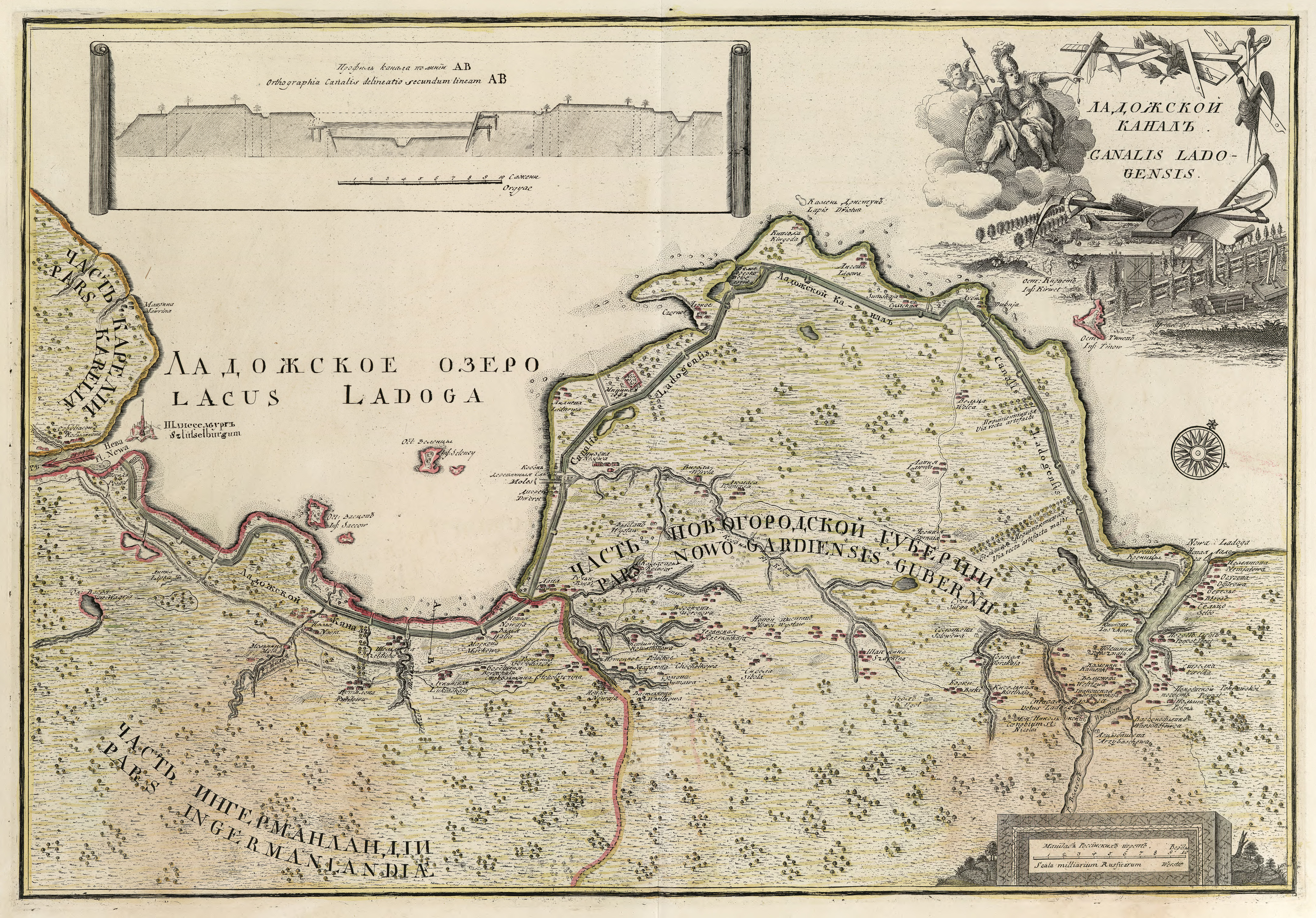
Map of the canal, 1742

The Ladoga Canal (Russian: Лaдожский канал, romanized: Ladozhsky Canal) is a historical water transport route, now situated in Leningrad Oblast, linking the Neva and the Svir River so as to bypass the stormy waters of Lake Ladoga which lies immediately to the northwest. It is about 117 kilometres (73 mi) long and comprises two distinct but overgrown canals, Old Ladoga Canal (built in 1719–1810, previously known as Peter the First Canal) and New Ladoga Canal (built in 1866–1883), running in parallel from Sviritsa on the Svir through Novaya Ladoga on the Volkhov to Shlisselburg on the Neva.

== History ==
The Ladoga Canal was one of the first major canals constructed in Russia. It was one of the projects of Peter the Great, who ordered its construction in 1718. Rapid economic development in Russia required a significant expansion of routes, especially waterways. One part of the Vyshny Volochyok Waterway (1709) linking the Volga river to the Baltic Sea, passed through Lake Ladoga. The Ladoga section of the route was one of the most difficult and dangerous because the lake is prone to winds and storms which destroyed hundreds of cargo ships.

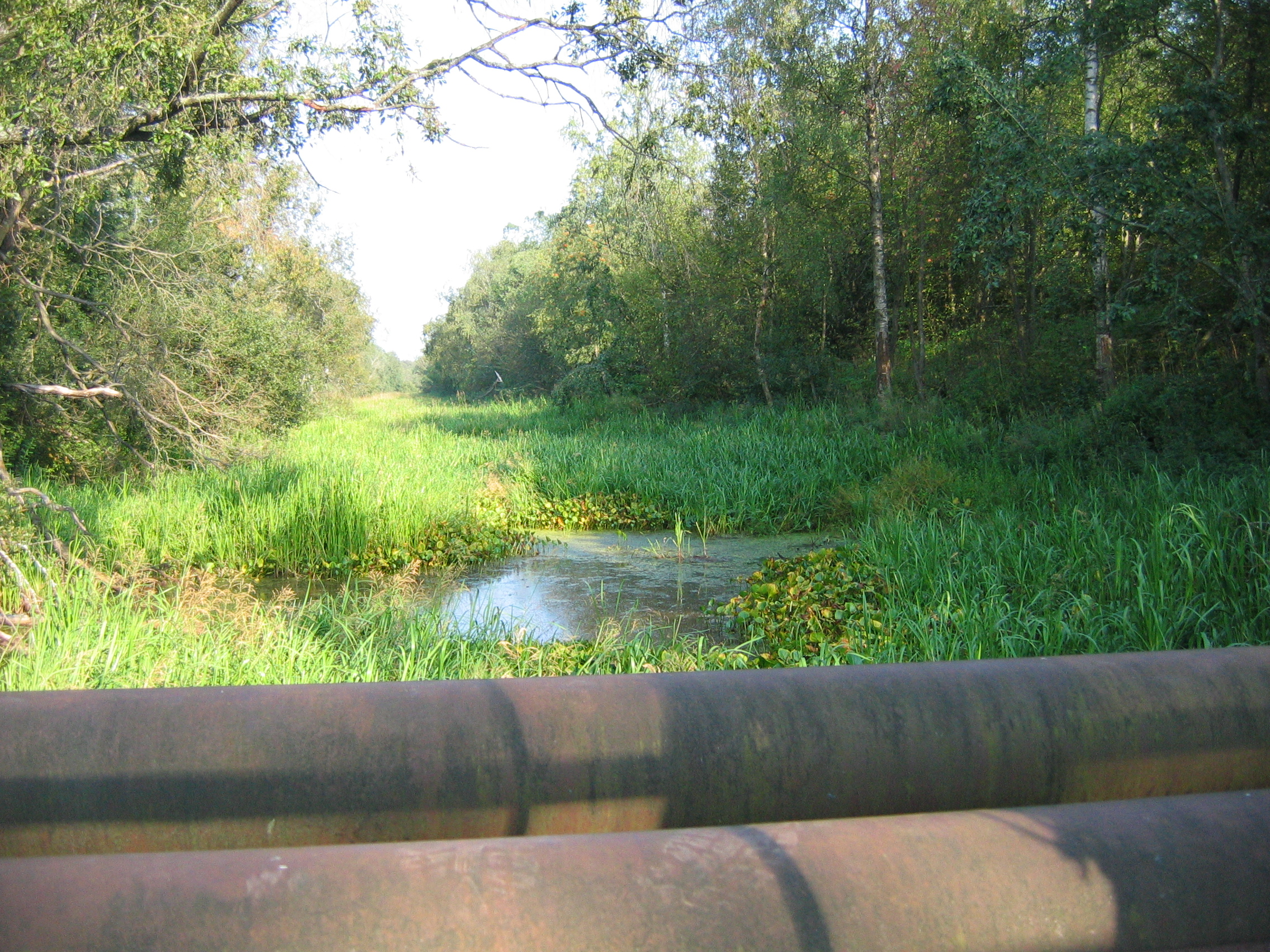
Old Ladoga Canal

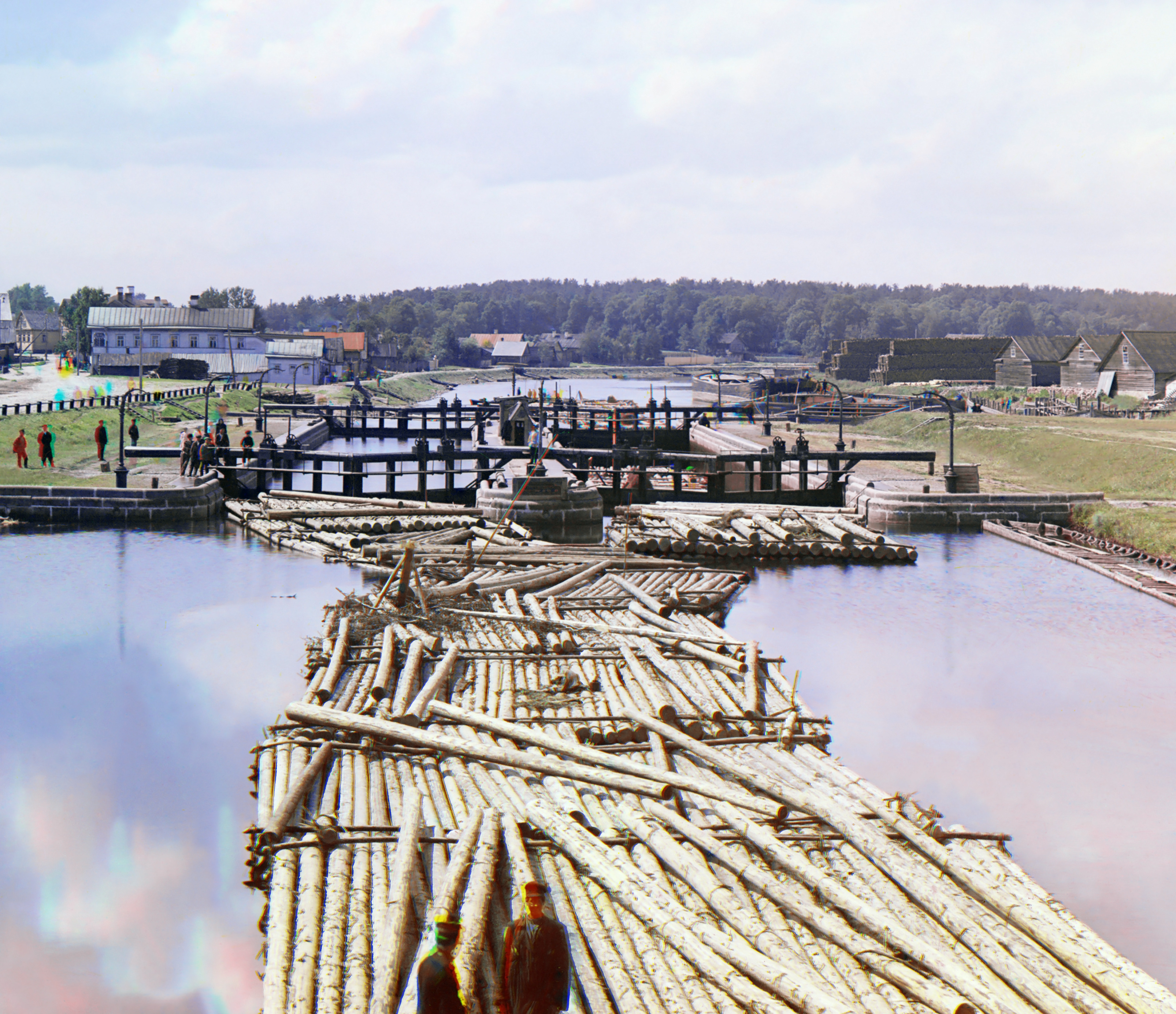
Lumber rafts on the Peter I Canal. Early 20th century picture by S. Prokudin-Gorsky

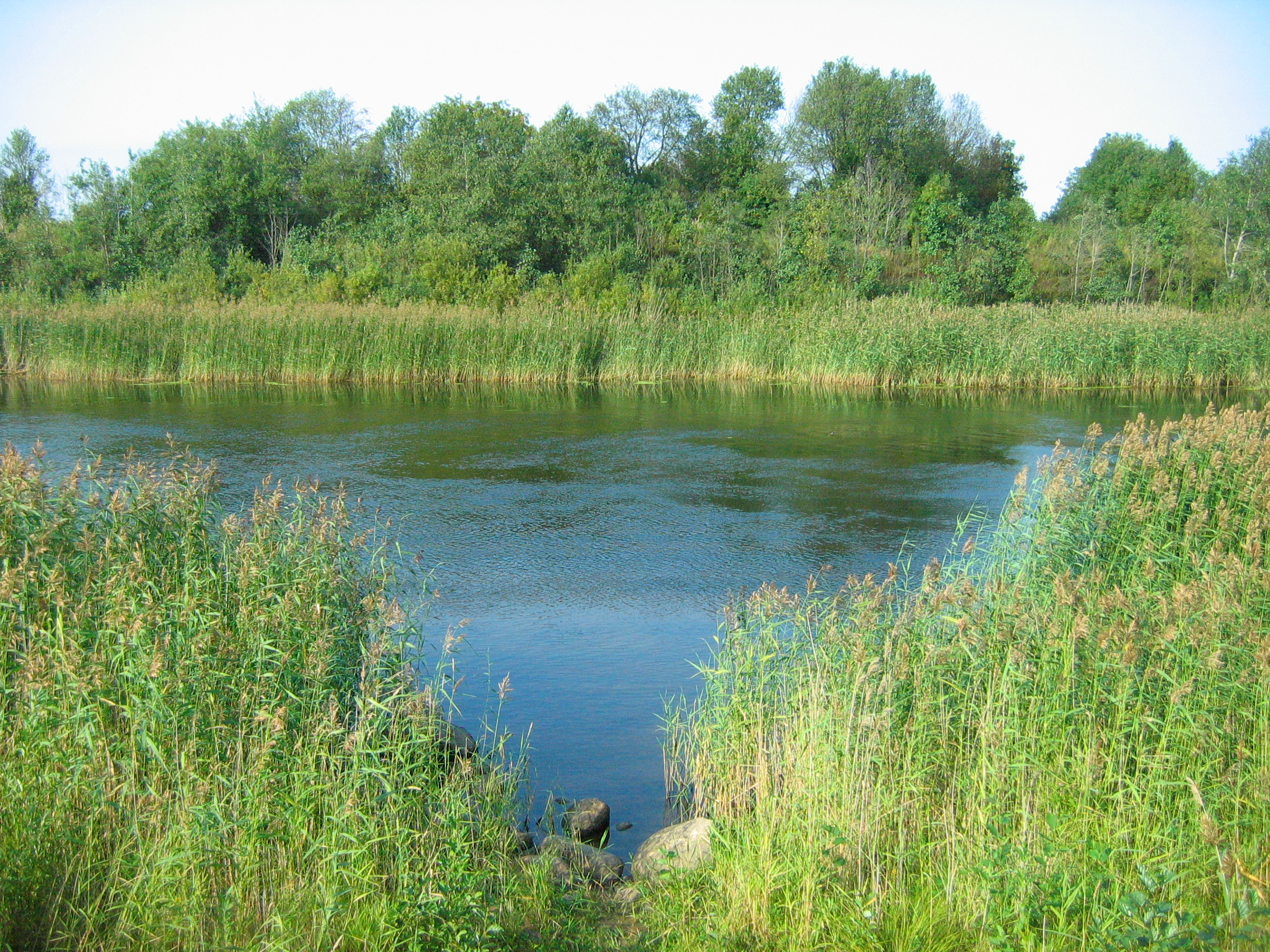
New Ladoga Canal overgrown with Phragmites australis

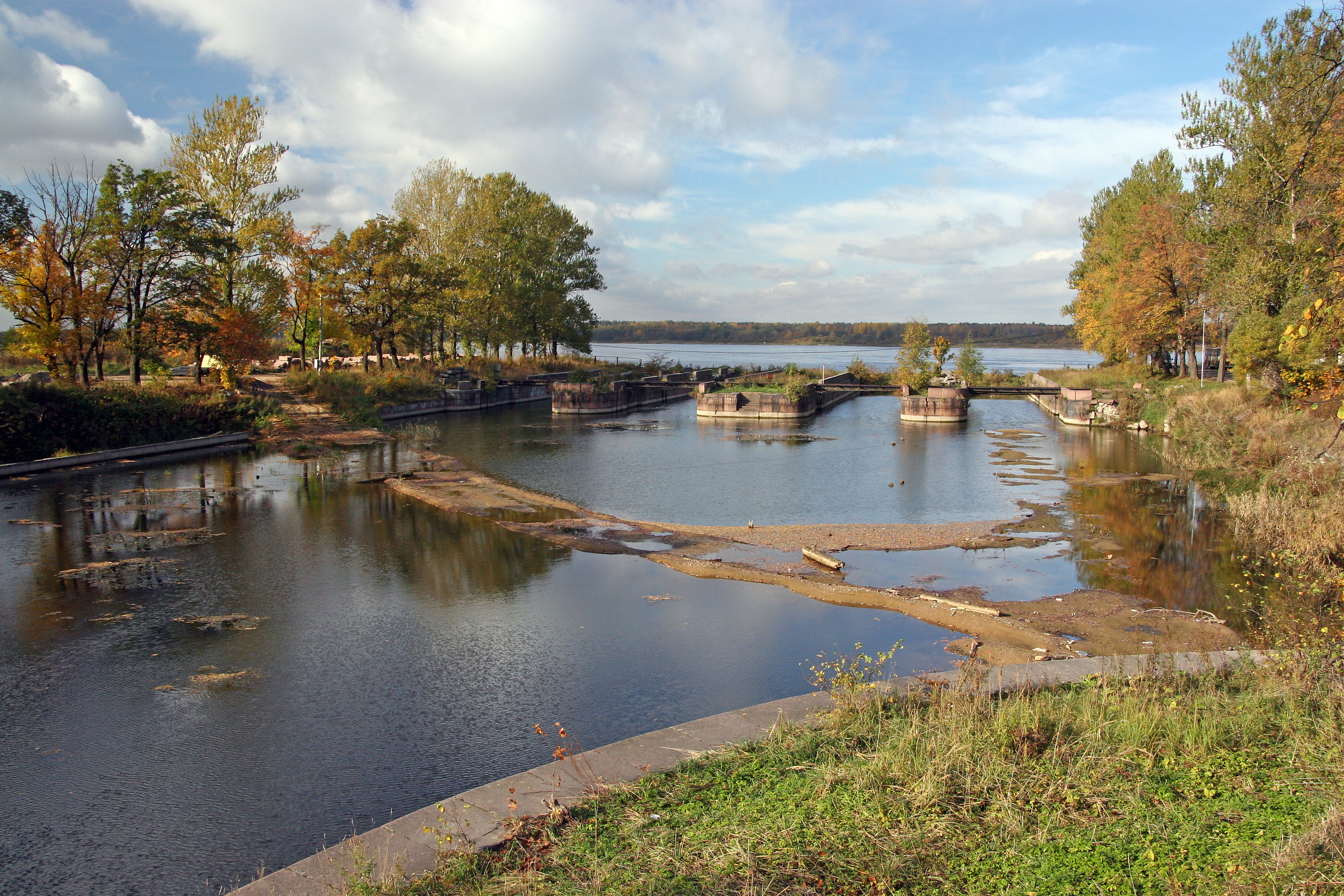
Sluice at Shlisselburg

Peter the Great decided to avoid the navigation in the huge and stormy lake by building a bypass canal. The construction started in 1719. Prince Menshikov put his friend General Skornyakov-Pisarev in charge of the project, but he eventually had to step down amid charges of incompetence, carelessness, and procrastination. In autumn 1723 the Tsar personally inspected the construction site and was not satisfied with the pace of construction; so much so that he ordered the arrest of Skornyakov-Pisarev and his German specialists. The task of completing the canal was taken from private hands and entrusted to Burkhard Christoph von Münnich who liberally utilized soldier labour.

A 29-kilometre (18 mi) long section between the Volkhov River and the village of Chornoe was completed and opened to traffic in 1726. This greatly accelerated work, as the completed section was used to deliver supplies to the construction site. The locks were constructed at Shlisselburg and Novaya Ladoga to maintain the depth needed for navigation. Construction of the canal was completed on October 22, 1730, and in spring 1731 the first boats were able to sail along the canal between the Volkhov River and the Neva River (Ladoga Canal proper).

It turned out that the canal had a depth of less than one metre, considerably less than envisioned by Peter I. This was a major disappointment to the government. Although the canal was one of the largest hydroengineering facilities in 18th-century Europe, it was still too shallow to maintain a considerable traffic. Catherine the Great decided to expand the canal by building another section between the Volkhov and Syas Rivers. This project was implemented between 1765 and 1802 (so-called Syas Canal). The third part of the Ladoga Canal, connecting the Syas and the Svir, was built over the years 1802 to 1810 (so-called Svir Canal).

In the course of the 19th century, the Ladoga Canal was used by about 15,000 vessels and 10,000 rafts heading towards St. Petersburg every year, but silted up so badly that Alexander II's government decided that it was more practicable to build a new canal instead of repairing the old facilities. The New Ladoga Canal was built closer to Lake Ladoga between 1866 and 1883. The Old Ladoga Canal was overgrown with grass and had become disused by 1940. The New Ladoga Canal is still used by small boats.
