= R21 highway (Russia) =

Road in Russia

Federal Highway R21
- Федеральная автомобильная дорога Р21
- Kola Highway

Route information
- Part of E105
- Length: 1,592 km (989 mi)
- Existed: 1986–present
- History: Was M18 from 1986–2018

Major junctions
- North end: Norwegian border near Borisoglebsky
- South end: Moskovsky Prospekt in St. Petersburg

Location
- Country: Russia

Highway system
- Russian Federal Highways

The R21 highway (in Cyrillic Р21), also known as the Kola Motorway, is a major highway in Russia, running from Saint Petersburg to Murmansk. The highway is part of European route E105 and is the main transportation route by road in the Republic of Karelia and the Murmansk Oblast. Its length is 1592 kilometers. Before 2018, the R21 was designated as M18.

== Route ==
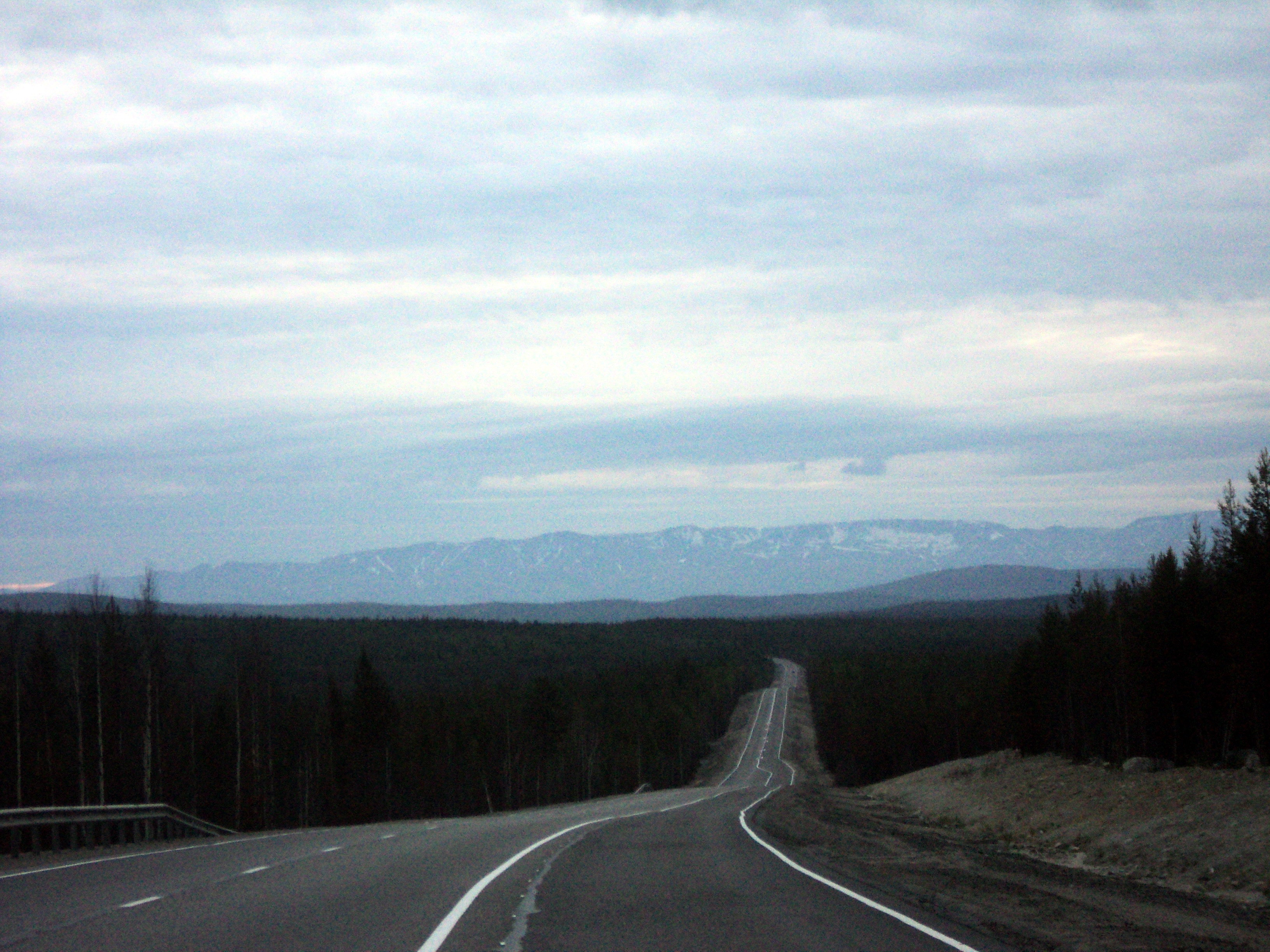

The R21 highway runs from Saint Petersburg, south of Lake Ladoga to Petrozavodsk, Kondopoga, Medvezhyegorsk, Segezha, Kem, Loukhi, Kandalaksha, Polyarnye Zori, Monchegorsk, Olenegorsk, Kola and ends in Severomorsk. It passes the Arctic Circle a couple of kilometers south of the border of Karelia and the Murmansk oblast, north of Loukhi.

== Landscape ==
In the Republic of Karelia, the landscape through which the R21 runs is mainly forest (birches), rivers and lakes. In the Murmansk Oblast, the highway runs for the most part through the Kola Peninsula, a severely polluted area. The landscape here is more open and consists partly of half-tundra.
