= Pavlovo, Kirovsky District, Leningrad Oblast =

Pavlovo Павлово
- Urban-type settlement
- Interactive map of Pavlovo
- Location of Pavlovo Pavlovo (Leningrad Oblast)
- Coordinates: 59°48′30″N 30°53′0″E
- Country: Russia
- Federal subject: Leningrad Oblast
- Administrative district: Kirovsky District
- Founded: 1923

Population (2010 Census)
  - Total: 3,250
  - Estimate (2024): 3,270 (+0.6%)

Municipal status
  - Municipal district: Kirovsky Municipal District
  - Urban settlement: Pavlovskoye Urban Settlement
  - Capital of: Pavlovskoye Urban Settlement
- Time zone: UTC+3 (MSK)
- Postal code: 187323
- OKTMO ID: 41625158051
- Website: mopavlovo.ru

Pavlovo (Russian: Па́влово) is an urban locality (an urban-type settlement) in Kirovsky District of Leningrad Oblast, Russia, located on the left bank of the Neva River, at the mouth of the Mga River, east of Saint Petersburg. Municipally, together with three rural localities, it is incorporated as Pavlovskoye Urban Settlement, one of the eight urban settlements in the district. Population: 3,250 (2010 census); 3,365 (2002 census); 3,886 (1989 Soviet census).

== History ==
Pavlovo, or Pavlovo-na-Neve, was founded in the second half of the 19th century to serve sand quarries which proliferated in the middle course of the Neva. The settlement was part of Sankt-Peterburgsky Uyezd of Saint Petersburg Governorate (from 1914 on, Petrogradsky Uyezd of Petrograd Governorate, later Leningradsky Uyezd of Leningrad Governorate).

On August 1, 1927, the uyezds were abolished and Mginsky District, with the administrative center in the settlement of Mga, was established. Pavlovo became a part of Mginsky District. The governorates were also abolished, and the district was a part of Leningrad Okrug of Leningrad Oblast. In 1929, construction of the brick production plant started. On July 23, 1930, the okrugs were abolished as well, and the districts were directly subordinated to the oblast. On September 20, 1930, the administrative center of the district was transferred to the selo of Putilovo, and the district renamed Putilovsky. On September 20, 1931 the district center was moved back to Mga, and the district was renamed back Mginsky. On February 9, 1931 Pavlovo was transferred to Leningradsky Prigorodny District, and on August 19, 1936, when the district was abolished, the settlement was transferred back to Mginsky District. Between September 1941 and January 1944, during World War II, Pavlovo was occupied by German troops. On May 29, 1959 Pavlovo was granted urban-type settlement status. On December 9, 1960 Mginsky District was abolished and split between Volkhovsky and Tosnensky Districts. Pavlovo remained in Tosnensky District. On April 1, 1977 Kirovsky District, essentially in the limits of former Mginsky District, was established by splitting off Volkhovsky and Tosnensky Districts, and Pavlovo was moved to Kirovsky District.

== Economy ==
=== Industry ===
The two industrial enterprises in the settlement produce bricks and candies.

=== Transportation ===
A railway leading from St. Petersburg (Ladozhsky railway station) to Mga and further to Volkhov passes Pavlovo; there are two passenger platforms in the settlement: Geroyskaya and Pavlovo-na-Neve.

Pavlovo is connected by roads with Saint Petersburg via Otradnoye, with Kirovsk, and with Mga.

The Neva is navigable.
