= Mga =

Mga Мга
- Urban-type settlement
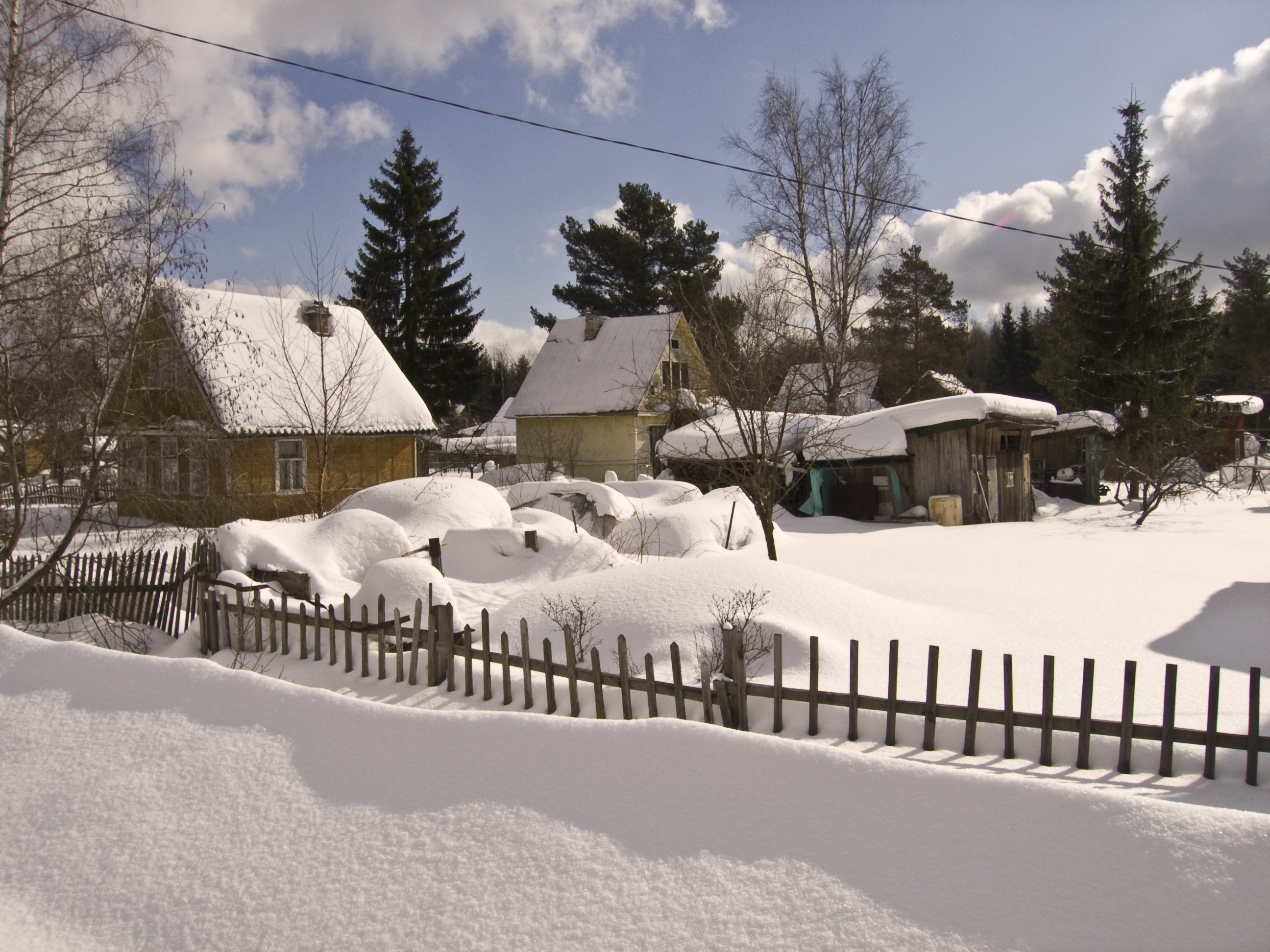
- The settlement in the winter
- Interactive map of Mga
- Location of Mga Mga (Leningrad Oblast)
- Coordinates: 59°45′N 31°04′E
- Country: Russia
- Federal subject: Leningrad Oblast
- Administrative district: Kirovsky District
- Established: 1901
- Urban-type settlement status since: 1937

Population (2010 Census)
  - Total: 10,212
  - Estimate (2024): 11,110 (+8.8%)

Municipal status
  - Municipal district: Kirovsky Municipal District
  - Urban settlement: Mginskoye Urban Settlement
  - Capital of: Mginskoye Urban Settlement
- Time zone: UTC+3 (MSK)
- Postal code: 187300
- Dialing code: +7 81362
- OKTMO ID: 41625154051

Mga (Russian: Мга) is an urban locality (an urban-type settlement) in Kirovsky District of Leningrad Oblast, Russia. Population: 10,212 (2010 census); 9,613 (2002 census); 9,852 (1989 Soviet census).

The name is almost certainly derived from the identically named Mga River on which it lies (which in turn is probably of Finno-Ugric origin); the suggestion that it comes from the initials of the owner of the land in the 19th century, Maria Grigorievna Apraksin (a member of the same family for which the Apraksin Dvor in St. Petersburg is named), is extremely unlikely.

== History ==
The settlement was founded in the beginning of the 20th century to serve the railway station. It was a part of Saint Petersburgsky Uyezd of Saint Petersburg Governorate. In 1914, Saint Peterburgsky Uyezd was renamed Petrogradsky Uyezd. On February 14, 1923 Shlisselburgsky Uyezd was merged into Petrogradsky Uyezd. In January, 1924 the uyezd was renamed Leningradsky. Saint Petersburg Governorate was twice renamed, to Petrograd Governorate and subsequently to Leningrad Governorate.

On August 1, 1927, the uyezds were abolished and Mginsky District, with the administrative center in Mga, was established. The governorates were also abolished, and the district was a part of Leningrad Okrug of Leningrad Oblast. On July 23, 1930, the okrugs were abolished as well, and the districts were directly subordinated to the oblast. On September 20, 1930, the administrative center of the district was transferred to the selo of Putilovo, and the district renamed Putilovsky. On September 20, 1931 the district center was moved back to Mga, and the district was renamed back Mginsky. On June 5, 1937 Mga was granted urban-type settlement status.

During World War II, Mga was a vital communications node; its capture by the Germans on August 30, 1941, cut the last rail connection between Leningrad and the remainder of the country. Later, it was one of the points in which the Soviet Army broke the Siege of Leningrad. The region, mainly comprising forests, was the scene of brutal fighting during the war years and was a resistance point to the German blockade and occupation. As a result, helmets, bullets, parts of weapons and heavy ammunition and other military equipment used both by Axis and Soviet forces during the war are found in sizable amounts in the forests of the region. Recently, inhabitants have often found armed bombs and grenades from the war years.

On December 9, 1960 Mginsky District was abolished and split between Volkhovsky and Tosnensky Districts. Mga was transferred to Tosnensky District. On April 1, 1977 Kirovsky District with the administrative center in Kirovsk, essentially in the limits of former Mginsky District, was established by splitting off Volkhovsky and Tosnensky Districts.

== Economy ==
=== Industry ===
Mga is essentially dependent on the enterprises serving the railway.

=== Transportation ===
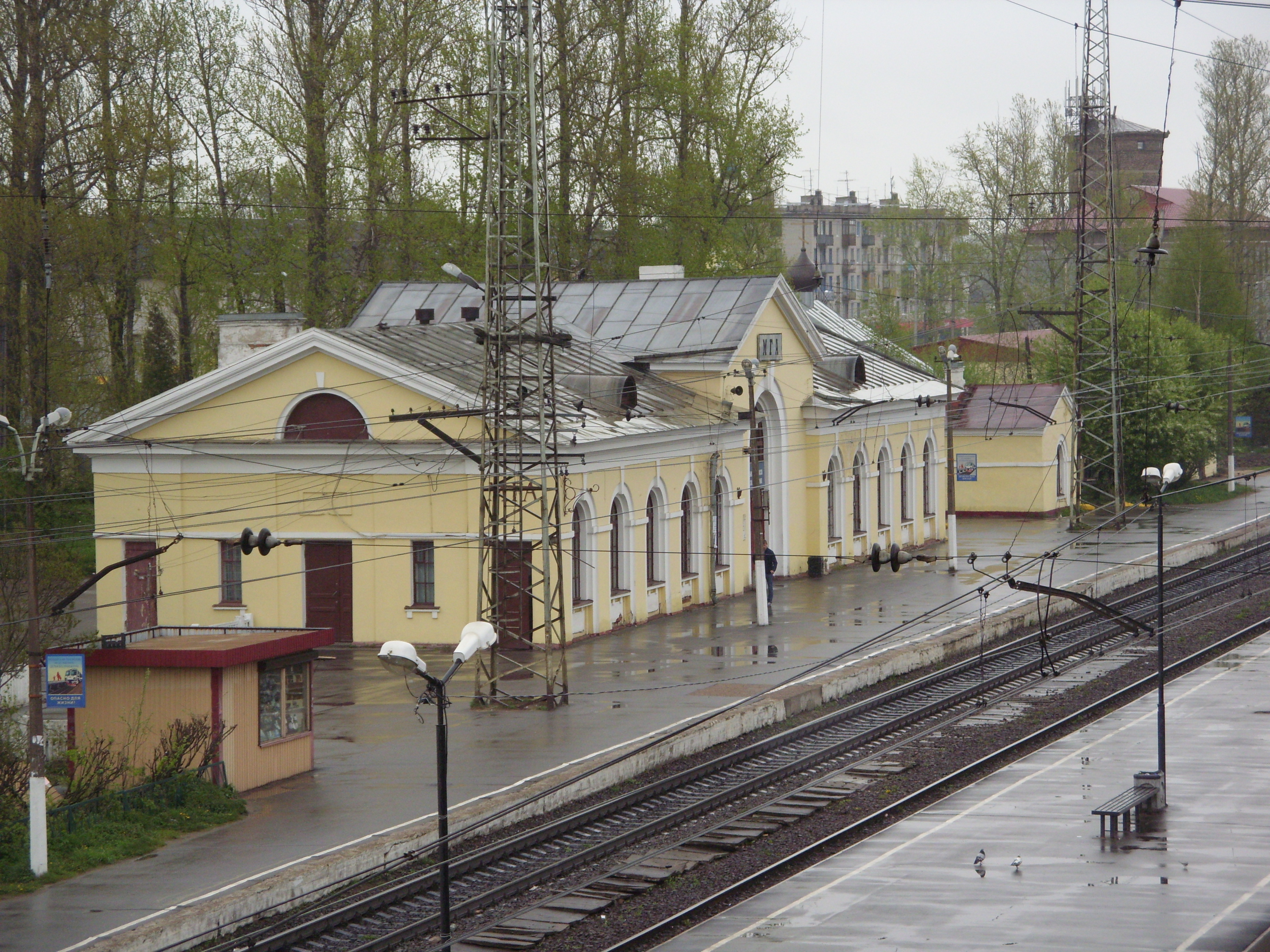
The railway station

Mga is an important railway node. There is a train service from St. Petersburg that passes through Mga leaving from the Moskovsky and Ladozhsky train stations in the eastward direction. This train also serves many other settlements in this region, and is used for travel to summer houses (dachas) by many St. Petersburg residents during the warmer seasons. Other railways connect Mga with Volkhov, Kirishi, Ulyanovka, and Kirovsk. All of them are served by suburban trains.

The A120 highway, which encircles Saint Petersburg, passes Mga and provides access to M18 highway, which connects Saint Petersburg and Murmansk, and to M10 highway, which connects Saint Petersburg and Moscow. Local roads also connect Mga with Tosno, Lyuban, and Pavlovo.

== Culture and recreation ==
Mga contains two cultural heritage monuments classified as cultural and historical heritage of local significance. Both monuments commemorate the events of World War II.
