= Finland Railway Bridge =

Bridge in Saint Petersburg, Russia

Finland Railway Bridge Финля́ндский железнодоро́жный мост
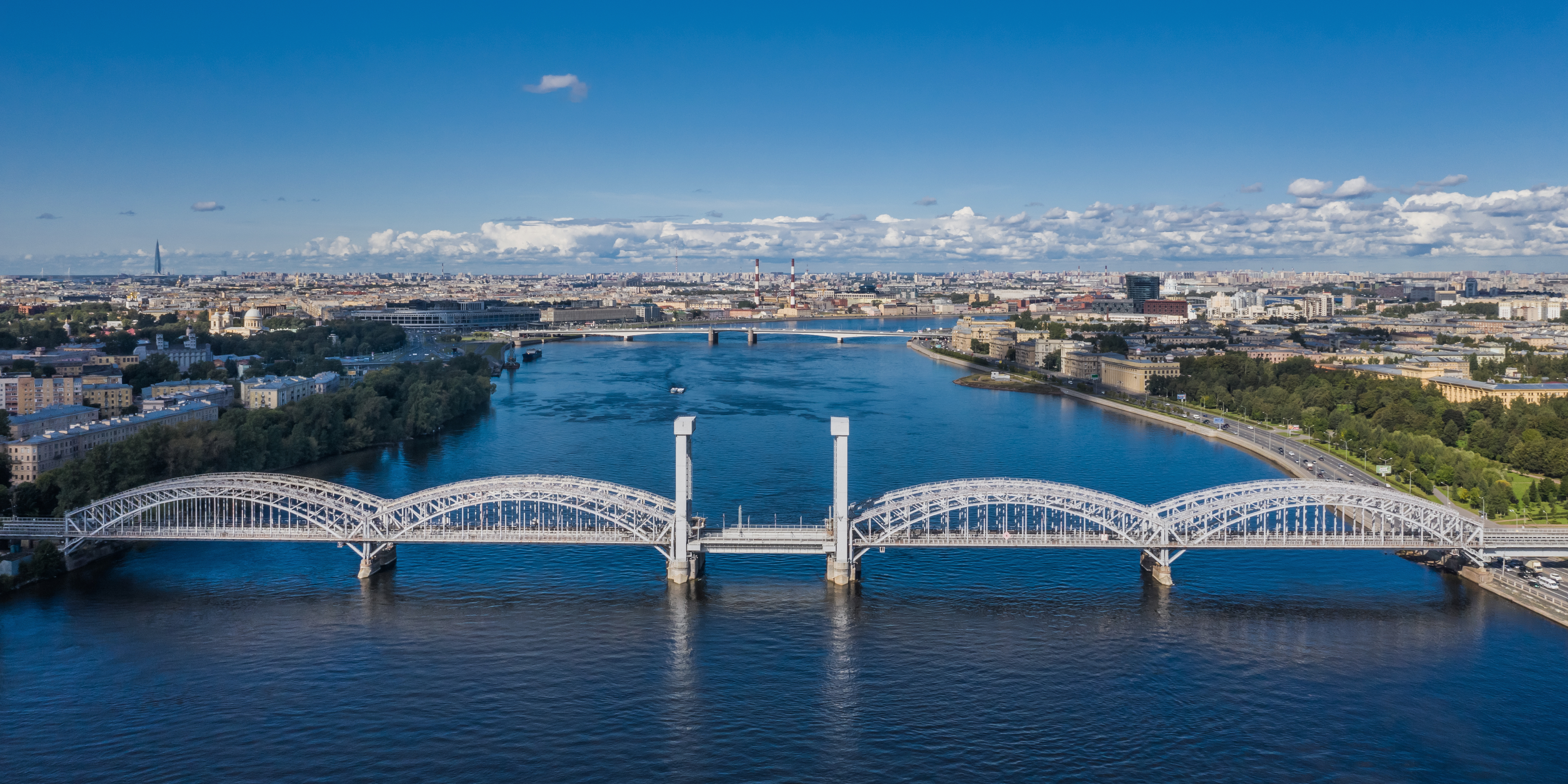
- Coordinates: 59°54′55″N 030°24′34″E
- Carries: Finland Railway
- Crosses: Neva River
- Locale: Saint Petersburg

Characteristics
- Total length: 538 m

History
- Opened: 1912, 1987

Location
- Interactive map of Finland Railway Bridge

The Finland Railway Bridge (Russian: Финля́ндский железнодоро́жный мост) is a pair of parallel rail bridges across the Neva River in Saint Petersburg, Russia. The movable bridges connect the Riihimäki–Saint Petersburg Railway and other railway networks in the north of St Petersburg with those in the south of St Petersburg. The same singular name is applied to both of the bridges.

== History ==
The first bridge was built in 1910–1912 by the engineers Nikolay Appolonovich Belelyubsky, Grigory Grigorievich Krivoshein, I.G. Aleksandrov and the architect Vladimir Petrovich Apyshkov. The bridge was primarily funded by the Grand Duchy of Finland because of the strategic value it delivered by connecting the Finland railway and the Finnish State Railways with the Russian Railways system.

In 1983, the reefer (refrigerated) ship Komsomolets Tatarii hit the bridge while transporting a cargo of 500 tonnes of vendace fish. The ship sustained a hole in its hull and sank several hundred metres downstream in middle of the Neva river, halfway to the Alexander Nevsky Bridge.

During 1983–1987, a second bridge, on the downstream side, was constructed parallel to the existing bridge by the engineer O.Y. Rusin. The spans of the new bridge followed the contours of the existing bridge arches. The central moving section of this second bridge is single-leaf bascule.

Pedestrians and cyclists are banned from crossing the bridge on anti-terrorism grounds.

== Engineering ==
The structure the bridge is closely related to the Bolsheokhtinsky Bridge. The same construction solution was also used in the design of the railway bridge across the Daugava River in Riga.

The bridge was constructed as a 538-metre-long (1,765 ft) steel bridge, carrying two rail tracks and a pedestrian path. The bridge design consists of four equal-width arched spans, each 110.7 metres (363 ft) long, surrounded by a pair of abutment spans and with a central draw span in the middle. The movable section was initially a twin-leaf bascule bridge design and later converted to a single span vertical-lift bridge.

The entrance to the bridge from the left bank passes through a concrete multi-span viaduct built during 1911–1913 by the Danish company Christiani. On the right bank, the bridge is approached via a metal overpass.

In 1988, the old bridge was closed to traffic because of serious corrosion damage. By 1994 the pivot span and turning machinery of the old bridge were dismantled.

In the period 2002–2003, a complete overhaul was carried out on the old bridge related to the construction of the Ladozhsky Rail Terminal with a total value of around 900 million rubles. During overhaul a new pivot span and turning machinery were mounted and the supporting bridge towers underwent renovation—the supporting piers of the bridge were substituted by new ones. The bridge's footings were strengthened by installing a reinforced concrete coating using falsework plates and underwater concreting. Additionally, the adjoining metal overpass was completely overhauled with the replacement of 43 pillars and the corresponding 42 spans. All the construction and repair work had been completed in January 2003.

== Bridge lift times ==
As of 2012 the bridge lift occurred once per night, between 02:20–05:30 in the morning, allowing a window for taller ships between 02:40–05:10. River navigation during the summer runs from 20 April–20 November each year, with a slight variation depending on the exact weather conditions. The times for the bridge lift remain constant during a particular navigation season, with slight alterations made every few years as necessary.

== See also ==
- List of bridges in Saint Petersburg
