= Neva =

River in Russia

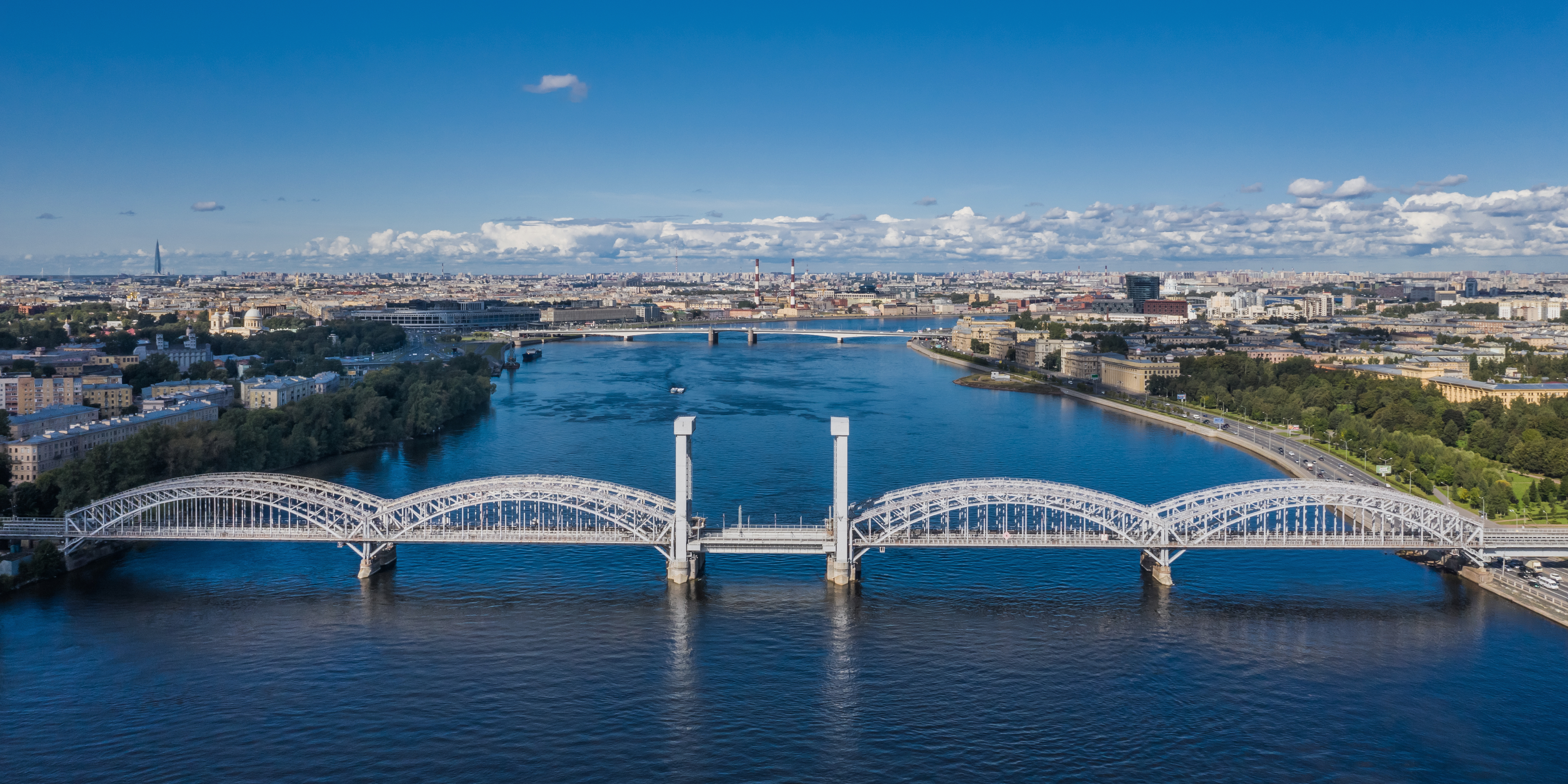

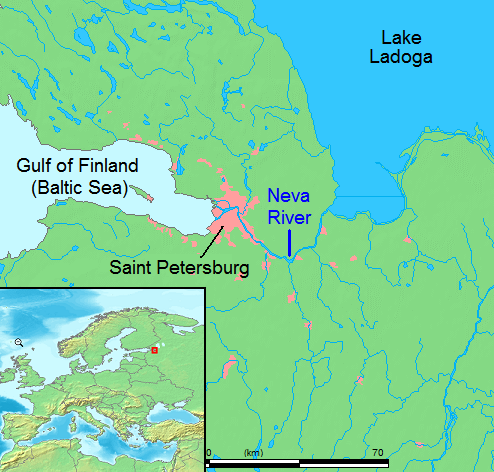
- Location of the Neva
- Native name: Нева (Russian)

Location
- Location: Northern Europe
- Country: Russian Federation
- Region: Leningrad Oblast, Saint Petersburg
- Cities: Shlisselburg, Kirovsk, Otradnoye, Saint Petersburg

Physical characteristics
- Source: Lake Ladoga
  - coordinates: 59°57′10″N 31°02′10″E
  - elevation: 4.3 m (14 ft)
- Mouth: Neva Bay
  - coordinates: 59°57′50″N 30°13′20″E
  - elevation: 0 m (0 ft)
- Length: 74 km (46 mi)
- Basin size: 282,300 km^{2} (109,000 mi^{2})
- Width
  - minimum: 210 metres (690 ft)
- Discharge
  - location: Saint Petersburg, Gulf of Finland (near mouth)
  - average: 2,628 m^{3}/s (92,800 cu ft/s)
  - maximum: 4,550 m^{3}/s (161,000 cu ft/s)

Basin features
- Tributaries
  - left: Mga, Tosna, Izhora
  - right: Okhta

Basin of Neva River

The Neva (/ˈniːvə/ NEE-və, UK also /ˈneɪvə/ NAY-və; Russian: Нева́, IPA: [nʲɪˈva]) is a river in northwestern Russia flowing from Lake Ladoga through the western part of Leningrad Oblast (historical region of Ingria) to the Neva Bay of the Gulf of Finland. Despite its modest length of 74 kilometres (46 mi), it is the fourth-largest river in Europe in terms of average discharge (after the Volga, the Danube and the Rhine).

The Neva is the only river flowing from Lake Ladoga. It flows through the city of Saint Petersburg, the three smaller towns of Shlisselburg, Kirovsk and Otradnoye, and dozens of settlements. It is navigable throughout and is part of the Volga–Baltic Waterway and White Sea–Baltic Canal. It is the site of many major historical events, including the Battle of the Neva in 1240 which gave Alexander Nevsky his name, the founding of Saint Petersburg in 1703, and the Siege of Leningrad by the German army during World War II. The river played a vital role in trade between Byzantium and Scandinavia.

== Etymology ==
The earliest people in recorded history known to have inhabited the area are the Finnic people. The word Neva is widespread in Finnic languages, having quite a few cognate meanings. In Finnish it means poor fen, in Karelian: watercourse and in Estonian (as nõva): waterway.

It has been postulated the name could derive from Indo-European adjective newā which means new – the river began its flow some time between 2000 BC and 1250 BC. However, the local place names with such influence coincide with Scandinavian traders and Slavs' first main settlement in the region, in the 8th century AD.

== Description ==
=== History of the delta ===
In the Paleozoic, 300–400 million years ago, all the delta region was covered by a sea. Modern relief, eminences, were formed by glacial scouring. Its retreat formed the Littorina Sea, the level of which was 7 to 9 metres (23 to 30 ft) higher than its successor the Baltic Sea. Then, the Tosna was flowing in the modern lower half of the Neva as today, into the Litorinal Sea. In the north of the Karelian Isthmus, the sea was united by a wide strait with Lake Ladoga. The Mga then flowed to the east, into Lake Ladoga, near the modern source of the Neva. Thus the Mga then was separate from the Tosna/lower-Neva basin.

Near the modern Lake Ladoga, by glacial rebound land rose faster, and an endorheic lake briefly formed. This overspilled, eventually the whole Mga valley and thus broke into the western valley (the valley of the Tosna/lower-Neva). The Ivanovo rapids of the modern Neva were created at the breakthrough. According to early books, the breakthrough may have been about 2000 BC, but according to more recent research, this happened at 1410–1250 BC, making the river rather young.

The valley is lined with glacial and post-glacial sediments and has changed little over 2,500 years. The delta was formed at that time, technically a pseudodelta, as not from accumulation of river material but by scouring past sediments.

=== Topography and hydrography ===
The Neva flows out of Lake Ladoga near Shlisselburg, flows through Neva's lowlands and discharges into the Baltic Sea in the Gulf of Finland. It has a length of 74 kilometres (46 mi), and the shortest distance from the source to the mouth is 45 kilometres (28 mi). The river banks are low and steep, on average about 3 to 6 metres (10 to 20 ft) and 2 to 3 metres (7 to 10 ft) at the mouth. There are three sharp turns: the Ivanovskye rapids, at Nevsky Forest Park of the Ust-Slavyanka region (the so-called "Crooked Knee"), and near the Smolny Institute, below the mouth of the river Okhta. The river declines 4.27 metres (14.0 ft) in elevation between source and mouth. At one point the river crosses a moraine ridge and forms the Ivanovskye rapids. There, at the beginning of the rapids, is the narrowest part of the river: 210 metres (690 ft). The average flow rate in the rapids is about 0.8–1.1 metres per second (2.6–3.6 ft/s). The average width along the river is 400 to 600 metres (1,300 to 2,000 ft). The widest places, at 1,000 to 1,250 metres (3,280 to 4,100 ft), are in the delta, near the gates of the marine trading port, at the end of the Ivanovskye rapids near the confluence of the river Tosna, and near the island Fabrinchny near the source. The average depth is 8 to 11 metres (26 to 36 ft); the maximum of 24 metres (79 ft) is reached above the Liteyny Bridge, and the minimum of 4.0 to 4.5 metres (13 to 15 ft) is in Ivanovskye rapids.

In the Neva basin, rainfall greatly exceeds evaporation; the latter accounts for only 37.7 percent of the water consumption from the Neva and the remaining 62.3 percent is water runoff. Since 1859, the largest volume of 116 cubic kilometres (28 mi^{3}) was observed in 1924 and the lowest in 1900 at 40.2 cubic kilometres (9.6 mi^{3}). The average annual discharge is 78.9 cubic kilometres (18.9 mi^{3}) or 2,500 cubic metres per second (88,000 cu ft/s) on average. Due to the uniform water flow from Lake Ladoga to the Neva over the whole year, there are almost no floods and corresponding water rise in the spring. The Neva freezes throughout from early December to early April. The ice thickness is 0.3 to 0.4 metres (1.0 to 1.3 ft) within Saint Petersburg and 0.5 to 0.6 metres (1.6 to 2.0 ft) in other areas. Ice congestion may form in winter in the upper reaches of the river, this sometimes causes upstream floods. Of the total ice volume of Lake Ladoga, 10.6 cubic kilometres (2.5 mi^{3}), less than 5 percent enters the Neva. The average summer water temperature is 17 to 20 °C (63 to 68 °F), and the swimming season lasts only about 1.5 months. The water is fresh, with medium turbidity; the average salinity is 61.3 mg/L and the calcium bicarbonate content is 7 mg/L.

Average streamflow. Values in brackets are percentage of the annual values.
Quantity	April to June	July to September	October to November	December to March	Total
Runoff, km^{3}	22.7 (28.5%)	23.5 (29.4%)	14.1 (17.7%)	19.4 (24.4%)	79.7
Suspended sediment, kt	162 (31.7%)	136 (26.7%)	143 (28.0%)	69 (13.6%)	510
Bottom sediments, kt	26.5 (40.8%)	15.8 (24.3%)	21.3 (32.7%)	1.4 ( 2.2%)	65.0
Ions runoff, kt	735 (25.6%)	729 (25.4%)	712 (24.8%)	694 (24.2%)	2870
Heat sink, 10^{15} cal	168 (28.4%)	359 (60.7%)	63 (10.7%)	1 (0.2%)	591
Ice runoff, km^{3}	0.57 (81.4%)	–	0.13 (18.6%)	–	0.7

View of the mouth of the Ladoga Canal and the Neva	The Neva at the mouth of the Izhora	The Neva near the Peter the Great Bridge	View from the Trinity Bridge

=== Basin, tributaries and distributaries ===
The basin area of Neva is 5,000 km^{2}, including the pools of Lake Ladoga and Onega (281,000 km^{2}). The basin contains 26,300 lakes and has a complex hydrological network of more than 48,300 rivers, however only 26 flow directly into Neva. The main tributaries are Mga, Tosna, Izhora, Slavyanka and Murzinka on the left, and Okhta and Chyornaya Rechka on the right side of Neva.

The hydrological network had been altered by the development of Saint Petersburg through its entire history. When it was founded in 1703, the area was low and swampy and required construction of canals and ponds for drainage. The earth excavated during their construction was used to raise the city. At the end of the 19th century, the delta of Neva consisted of 48 rivers and canals and 101 islands. The most significant distributaries of the delta are listed in the table. Before construction of the Obvodny Canal, the left tributary of that area was the Volkovka; its part at the confluence is now called Monastyrka. The Ladoga Canal starts at the root of Neva and connects it along the southern coast of Lake Ladoga with the Volkhov.

Some canals of the delta were filled over time, so that only 42 islands remained by 1972, all within the city limits of St. Petersburg. The largest islands are Vasilyevsky at 1,050 hectares (2,600 acres), Petrogradsky at 570 hectares (1,400 acres), Krestovsky at 420 hectares (1,000 acres), and Dekabristov at 410 hectares (1,000 acres); others include Zayachy, Yelagin and Kamenny Islands. At the source of the Neva, near Shlisselburg, there are the two small islands of Orekhovy and Fabrichny. Island Glavryba lies up the river, above the town of Otradnoye.

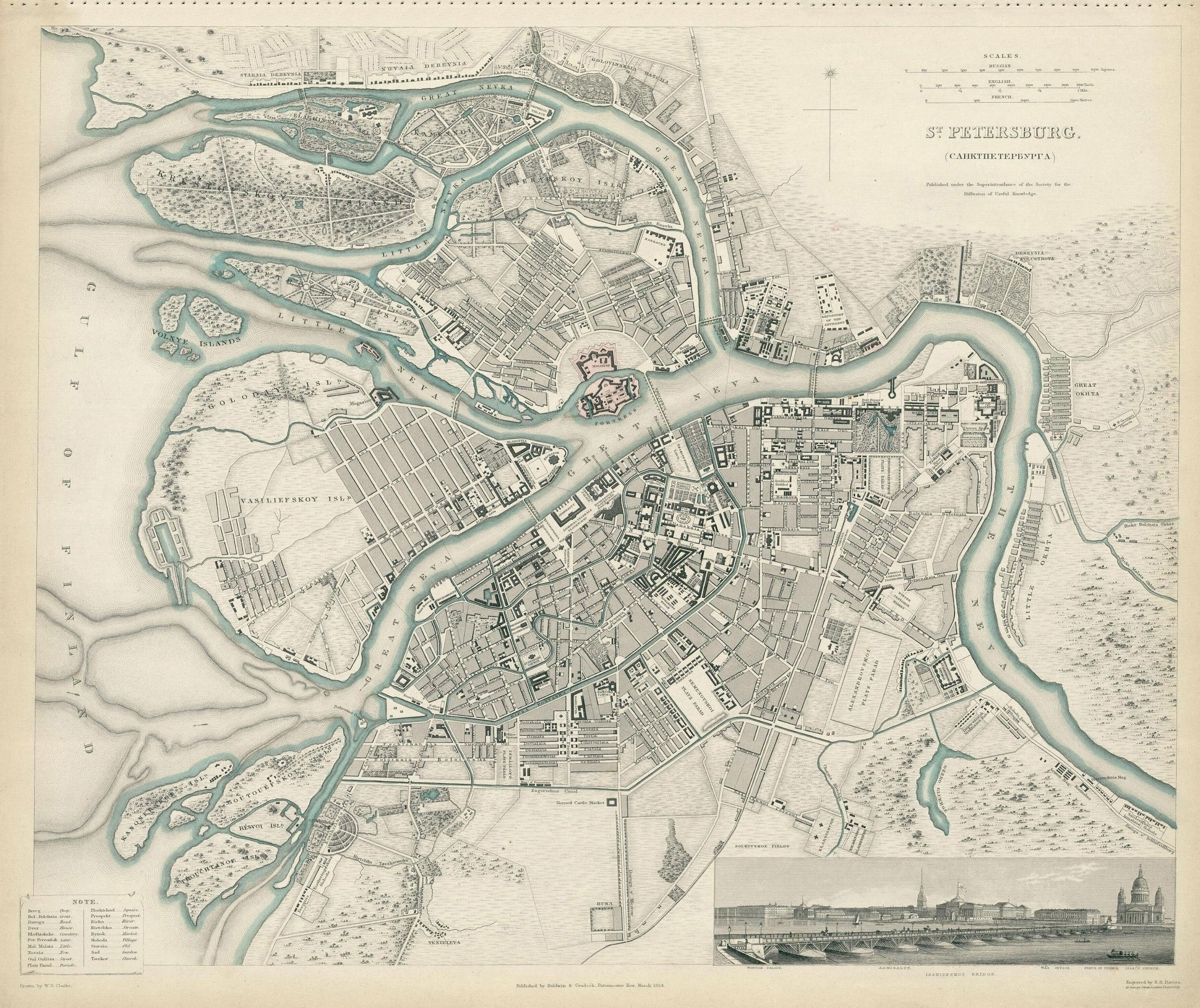
English map of 1834 depicting the city centre and the names of Neva arms

Main waterways of the Neva delta.
Name	Region	Length, km
Great Neva	from the mouth of the Fontanka to the Blagoveshchensky Bridge	2.40
Great Neva	From the Blagoveshchensky Bridge to the Palace Bridge	1.22
Little Neva		4.85
Ekateringofka		3.60
Zhdanovka		2.20
Smolenka		3.30
Great Nevka	from the Neva to Little Nevka	3.70
Great Nevka	from Little Nevka to Middle Nevka	2.05
Great Nevka	From Middle Nevka to Neva Bay	2.15
Middle Nevka		2.60
Little Nevka		4.90
Karpovka		3.00
Krestovka		0.74
Fontanka		6.70
Moyka		4.67
Griboyedov Canal		5.00
Pryazhka		1.32
Kryukov Canal		1.15
Obvodny Canal		8.08

=== Flora and fauna ===
There is almost no aquatic vegetation in Neva. The river banks mostly consist of sand, podsol, gleysols, peat, and boggy peat soils. Several centuries ago, the whole territory of the Neva lowland was covered by pine and spruce mossy forests. They were gradually reduced by the fires and cutting for technical needs. Extensive damage was caused during World War II: in Saint Petersburg, the forests were reduced completely, and in the upper reaches down to 40 to 50 percent. Forest were replanted after the war with spruce, pine, cedar, Siberian larch, oak, Norway maple, elm, America, ash, apple tree, mountain ash and other species. The shrubs include barberry, lilac, jasmine, hazel, honeysuckle, hawthorn, rose hip, viburnum, juniper, elder, shadbush and many others.

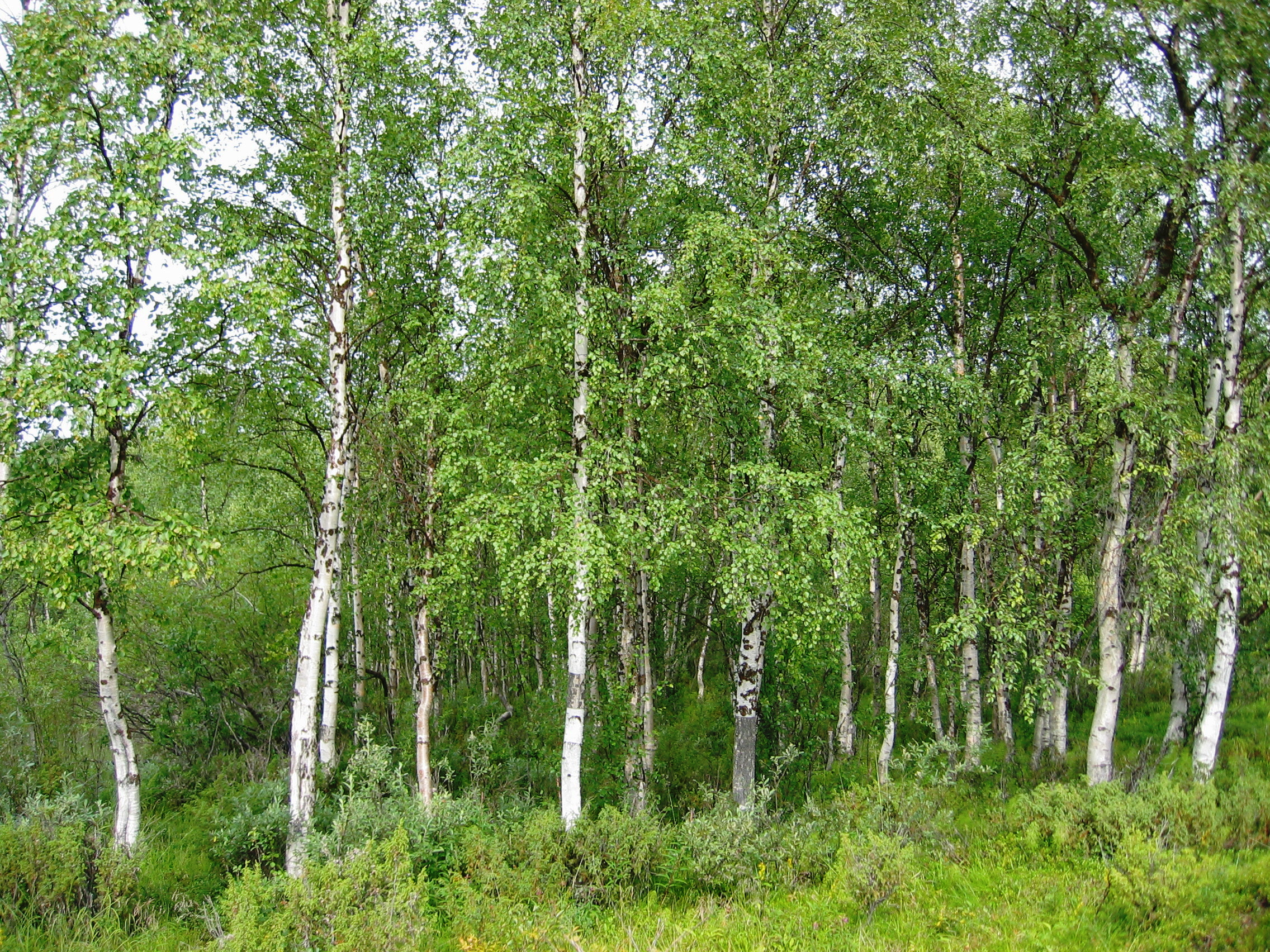
Birch forest

Nowadays, the upper regions of the river are dominated by birch and pine-birch grass-shrub forests and in the middle regions there are swampy pine forests.

In St. Petersburg, along the Neva, there are many gardens and parks, including the Summer Garden, Field of Mars, Rumyantsev, Smolny, Alexander Gardens, Garden of the Alexander Nevsky Lavra and many others.

Because of the rapid flow, cold water and lack of quiet pools and aquatic vegetation the diversity of fish species in Neva is small. Permanent residents include such undemanding to environment species as perch, ruffe and roaches. Many fish species are transitory, of which commercial value have smelt, vendace and partly salmon.

=== Floods ===
Floods in St. Petersburg are usually caused by the overflow of the delta of Neva and by surging water in the eastern part of Neva Bay. They are registered when the water rises above 160 centimetres (63 in) with respect to a gauge at the Mining Institute. More than 300 floods occurred after the city was founded in 1703. Three of them were catastrophic: on 7 November 1824, when water rose to 421 centimetres (166 in); on 23 September 1924 when it reached 369 centimetres (145 in), and 10 September 1777 when it rose to 321 centimetres (126 in). However, a much larger flood of 760 centimetres (300 in) was described in 1691.

Besides flooding as a result of tidal waves, in 1903, 1921 and 1956 floods were caused by the melting of snow.

Floods in St. Petersburg
7 November 1824, in front of Bolshoi Theatre	7 November 1824	Sadovaya Street near the former Nikolsky Market, 15 November 1903	Bolshaya Podyacheskaya Street, 25 November 1903
Boat transportation over Vasilievsky Island during the flood of 23 September 1924	Vladimirsky Avenue after the flood of 1924	A pier during the flood of 18 October 1967	Near the Mining Institute on 18 October 1967

=== Ecological condition ===
The Federal Service for Hydrometeorology and Environmental Monitoring of Russia classifies the Neva as a "heavily polluted" river. The main pollutants include copper, zinc, manganese, nitrites and nitrogen. The dirtiest tributaries of the Neva are the Mga, Slavyanka, Ohta, and Chernaya. Hundreds of factories pour wastewater into the Neva within St. Petersburg, and petroleum is regularly transported along the river. The annual influx of pollutants is 80,000 tonnes, and the heaviest polluters are Power-and-heating Plant 2 (Russian: ТЭЦ-2), "Plastpolymer" and "Obukhov State Plant". The biggest polluters in the Leningrad Oblast are the cities of Shlisselburg, Kirovsk and Otradnoye, as well as the Kirov thermal power station. More than 40 oil spills are registered on the river every year.

In 2008, the Federal Service of St. Petersburg announced that no beach of the Neva was fit for swimming.

Cleaning of wastewater in Saint Petersburg started in 1979; by 1997, about 74% was purified. This rose to 85% in 2005, to 91.7% by 2008, and Feliks Karamzinov expected it to reach almost 100% by 2011 with the completion of the expansion of the main sewerage plant.

== History ==
=== Before 1700 ===
Many sites of ancient people, up to nine thousand years old, were found within the territory of the Neva basin. It is believed that around twelve thousand years BC, Finnic people (Votes and Izhorians) moved to this area from the Ural Mountains.

In the 8th and 9th centuries AD, the area was inhabited by the East Slavs who were mainly engaged in slash and burn agriculture, hunting and fishing. From the 8th to 13th centuries, Neva provided a waterway from Scandinavia to the Byzantine Empire. In the 9th century, the area belonged to Veliky Novgorod. The Neva was already mentioned in the Life of Alexander Nevsky (13th century). At that time, Veliky Novgorod was engaged in nearly constant wars with Sweden. A major battle occurred on 15 July 1240 at the confluence of the Izhora and Neva Rivers. The Russian army, led by the 20-year-old Prince Alexander Yaroslavich, aimed to stop the planned Swedish invasion. The Swedish army was defeated; the prince showed personal courage in combat and received the honorary name of "Nevsky".

As a result of the Russian defeat in the Ingrian War of 1610–17 and the concomitant Treaty of Stolbovo, the area of the Neva River became part of Swedish Ingria. Beginning in 1642, the capital of Ingria was Nyen, a city near the Nyenschantz fortress. Because of financial and religious oppression, much of the Orthodox population left the Neva region, emptying 60 percent of the villages by 1620. The abandoned areas became populated by people from the Karelian Isthmus and Savonia.

Victory of Alexander Nevsky over the Swedes by B. Chorikov	Assault on the Oreshek fortress on 11 October 1702 by Alexander Kotzebue	Map of the Peter the Great Canal (1742)	Map of St. Petersburg (1720)

=== Russian period ===
As a result of the Great Northern War of 1700–21, the valley of Neva River became part of Russian Empire. On 16 May 1703, the city of St. Petersburg was founded in the mouth of Neva and became capital of Russia in 1712. Neva became the central part of the city. It was cleaned, intersected with canals and enclosed with embankments. In 1715, construction began of the first wooden embankment between the Admiralty building and the Summer Garden. In the early 1760s works started to cover it in granite and to build bridges across Neva and its canals and tributaries, such as the Hermitage Bridge.

From 1727 to 1916, the temporary Isaakievsky pontoon bridge was early constructed between the modern Saint Isaac's Square and Vasilievsky Island. A similar, but much longer Trinity pontoon bridge, which spanned 500 metres (1,600 ft), was brought from the Summer Garden to Petrogradsky Island. The first permanent bridge across Neva, Blagoveshchensky Bridge, was opened in 1850, and the second, Liteyny Bridge, came into operation in 1879.

In 1858, a "Joint-stock company St. Petersburg water supply" was established, which built the first water supply network in the city. A two-stage water purification station was constructed in 1911. The development of the sewerage system began only in 1920, after the October Revolution, and by 1941, the sewerage network was 1,130 kilometres (700 mi) long.

Every winter from 1895 to 1910, electric tramways were laid on the ice of the river, connecting the Senate Square, Vasilievsky island, Palace Embankment and other parts of the city. The power was supplied through the rails and a top cable supported by wooden piles frozen into the ice. The service was highly successful and ran without major accidents except for a few failures in the top electrical wires. The trams ran at the speed of 20 kilometres per hour (12 mph) and could carry 20 passengers per carriage. The carriages were converted from the used horsecars. About 900,000 passengers were transported over a regular season between 20 January and 21 March. The sparking of contacts at the top wires amused spectators in the night.

View down the Neva River between the Winter Palace and St. Petersburg Academy of Sciences. Engraving of 1753.	Palace Embankment (1826)	View on the Smolny Convent from Bolshaya Ohta (1851)	Tramways on the frozen Neva (more images)

=== Soviet and modern periods ===
The first concrete bridge across Neva, the Volodarsky Bridge, was built in 1936. During World War II, from 8 September 1941 to 27 January 1944, Leningrad was in the devastating German Siege. On 30 August 1941, the German army captured Mga and came to Neva. On 8 September Germans captured Shlisselburg and cut all land communications and waterways to St. Petersburg (then Leningrad). The siege was partly relieved in January 1943, and ended on 27 January 1944.

A river station was built above the Volodarsky Bridge in 1970 which could accept 10 large ships at a time. Wastewater treatment plants were built in Krasnoselsk in 1978, on the Belyi Island in 1979–83, and in Olgino in 1987–94. The South-West Wastewater Treatment Plant was constructed in 2003–05.

== Commercial use ==
Neva has very few shoals and its banks are steep, making the river well suited for navigation. Utkino Backwaters were constructed in the late 19th century to park unused ships. Neva is part of the major Volga–Baltic Waterway and White Sea – Baltic Canal, however it has relatively low transport capacity because of its width, depth and bridges. Neva is available for vessels with capacity below 5,000 tonnes. Major transported goods include timber from Arkhangelsk and Vologda; apatite, granite and diabase from Kola Peninsula; cast iron and steel from Cherepovets; coal from Donetsk and Kuznetsk; pyrite from Ural; potassium chloride from Solikamsk; oil from Volga region. There are also many passenger routes to Moscow, Astrakhan, Rostov, Perm, Nizhny Novgorod, Valaam and other destinations. Navigation season on the Neva River runs from late April to November.

To the west of Shlisselburg, an oil pipeline runs under the river. The pipeline is part of the Baltic Pipeline System, which provides oil from Timan-Pechora plate, West Siberia, Ural, Kazakhstan and Primorsk to the Gulf of Finland. The 774-metre (2,539 ft) long pipeline lies 7 to 9 metres (23 to 30 ft) below the river bottom and delivers about 42 million tonnes of oil a year.

Near the Ladozhsky Bridge there is an underwater tunnel to host a gas pipeline Nord Stream 1. The tunnel has a diameter of 2 metres (6.6 ft) and a length of 750 metres (2,460 ft) and is laid at a maximum depth of 25 metres (82 ft).

Neva is the main source of water (96 percent) of St. Petersburg and its suburbs. From 26 June 2009, St. Petersburg started processing the drinking water with ultraviolet light, abandoning the use of chlorine for disinfection. The Neva also has developed fishery, both commercial and recreational.

== Bridges ==
Leningrad Oblast:

- Ladozhsky Bridge – built in 1981 as a movable multi-span metal bridge on stone piers.
- Kuzminsky Railway Bridge – built in 1940 as a movable three-segment railway bridge.

St. Petersburg:

- Big Obukhovsky Bridge – built in 2004 as a cable-stayed bridge connecting Obukhovsky Defense avenue with Oktyabrskaya Embankment.
- Volodarsky Bridge – built in 1936 as a movable concrete bridge connecting Narodnaya and Ivanovo streets.
- Finland Railway Bridge – built in 1912 as a movable, metallic, double-segment railway bridge.

St. Petersburg, Neva delta

- Alexander Nevsky Bridge – built in 1965 as a movable concrete bridge connecting Alexander Nevsky Square and Zanevsky Avenue.
- Peter the Great Bridge – built in 1911 as a movable, three-segment, metal bridge connecting the historic center of St. Petersburg with the Malaya Ohta district.
- Liteyny Bridge (formerly the bridge of Alexander II) – built in 1879 as a movable, six-segment, arch bridge connecting Liteyny Prospekt with Academician Lebedev Str. and Vyborg.
- Trinity Bridge (formerly the Kirov bridge) – built in 1903 as a five-segment movable metal bridge connecting Suvorov Square, Trinity Square and Kamennoostrovsky Prospekt.
- Palace Bridge – built in 1916 as a movable, five-segment, iron bridge. Its opened central span is one of the city symbols. Connects Nevsky Prospekt with the Exchange Square and Vasilievsky Island.
- Blagoveshchensky Bridge (formerly the Lieutenant Schmidt Bridge) – built in 1850 as a movable seven-segment iron bridge connecting Labour Square with the 7th Line of Vasilievsky Island.

Kuzminsky railway bridge	Big Obukhovsky Bridge	Liteyny Bridge	Blagoveshchensky Bridge

Construction of the Novo-Admiralteisky Bridge, a movable drawbridge across the river, has been approved, but will not commence before 2011.

== Attractions ==
Whereas most tourist attractions of Neva are located within St. Petersburg, there are several historical places upstream, in the Leningrad Oblast. They include the fortress Oreshek, which was built in 1323 on the Orekhovy Island at the source of Neva River, south-west of the Petrokrepost Bay, near the city of Shlisselburg. The waterfront of Schlisselburg has a monument of Peter I. In the city, there are Blagoveshchensky Cathedral (1764–95) and a still functioning Orthodox church of St. Nicholas, built in 1739. On the river bank stands the Church of the Intercession. Raised in 2007, it is a wooden replica of a historical church which stood on the southern shore of Lake Onega. That church was constructed in 1708 and it burned down in 1963. It is believed to be the forerunner of the famous Kizhi Pogost.

Old Ladoga Canal, built in the first half of the 18th century, is a water transport route along the shore of Lake Ladoga which is connecting the River Volkhov and Neva. Some of its historical structures are preserved, such as a four-chamber granite sluice (1836) and a bridge (1832).

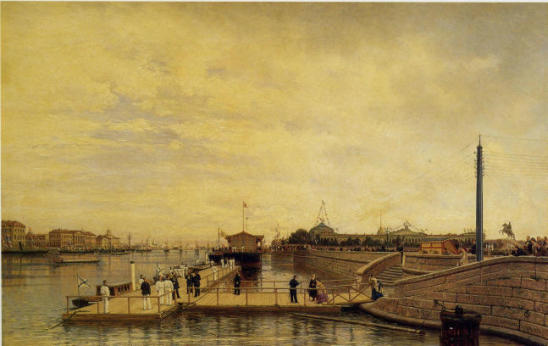
The Neva River in a nineteenth-century painting

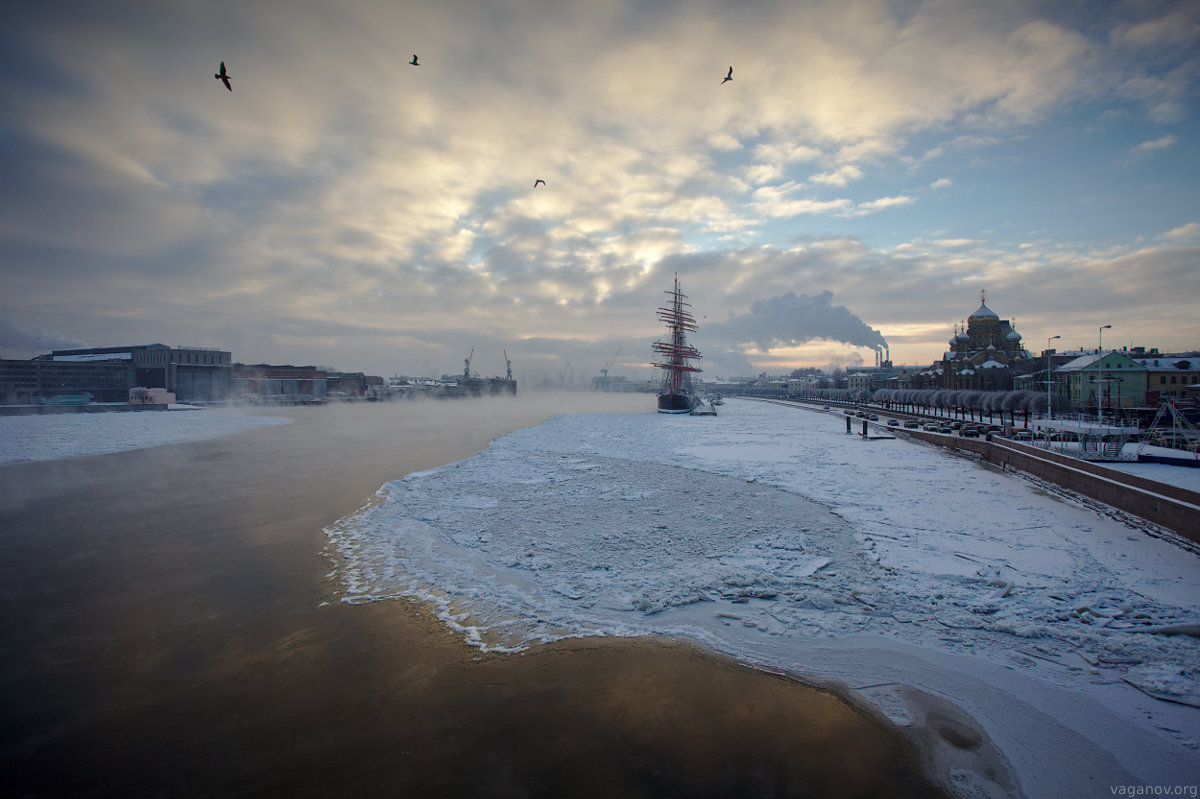
Sunset over an ice-covered Neva River

== Notable incidents ==
On 21 August 1963, a Soviet twinjet Tu-124 airliner performed an emergency water landing on the Neva near the Finland Railway Bridge. The plane took off from Tallinn-Ülemiste Airport (TLL) at 08:55 on 21 August 1963 with 45 passengers and seven crew on board and was scheduled to land at Moscow-Vnukovo (VKO). After liftoff, the crew noticed that the nose gear undercarriage did not retract, and the ground control diverted the flight to Leningrad (LED) because of fog at Tallinn. While circling above St. Petersburg at the altitude of 1,650 feet (500 m), under unclear circumstances (lack of fuel was one of the factors), both engines stalled. The crew performed an emergency landing on the Neva River, barely missing some of its bridges and an 1898-built steam tugboat. The tugboat rushed to the plane and towed it to the shore. The plane's pilot was at first fired from his job but was later reinstated and awarded the Order of the Red Star.
