= Liteyny Bridge =

Bridge in Saint Petersburg, Russia

Liteyny Bridge Литейный мост
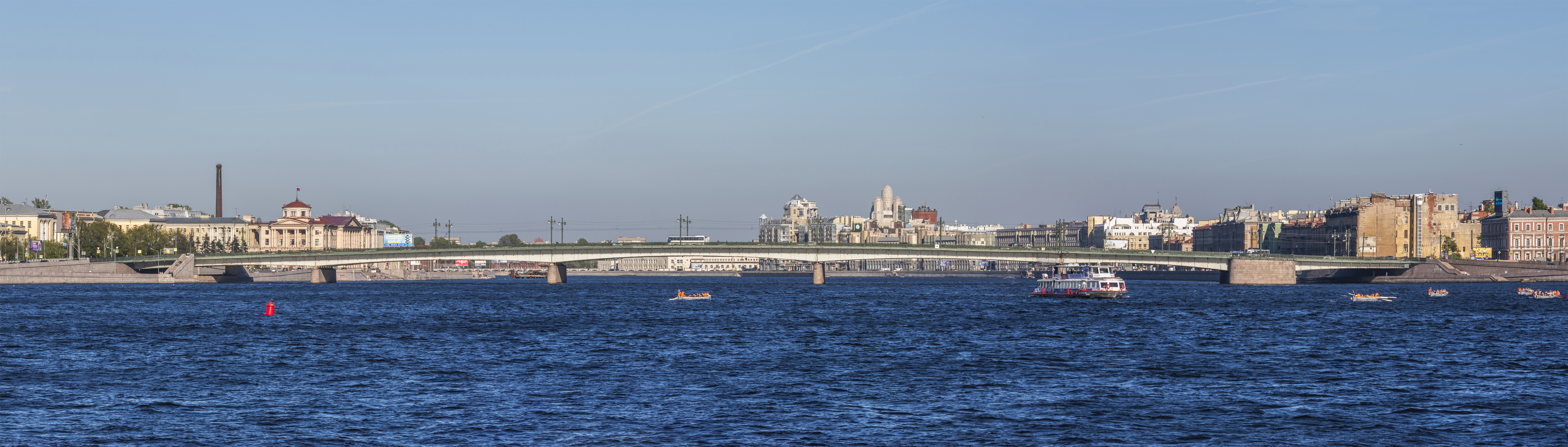
- Coordinates: 59°57′7.13″N 30°20′58.22″E
- Carries: 6 lanes of roadway, tram lines
- Crosses: Neva River
- Locale: Saint Petersburg
- Website: en.mostotrest-spb.ru/bridges/litejnyj

Characteristics
- Design: Segmental bridge, bascule bridge
- Total length: 394,3 meters
- Width: 34 meters
- Longest span: 55 meters

History
- Opened: 1879, October 1

Location
- Interactive map of Liteyny Bridge; Литейный мост

The Liteyny Bridge (Russian: Литейный мост) is the second permanent bridge across the Neva river in Saint Petersburg, Russia. It connects Liteyny Prospekt with Vyborgsky district. The bridge's length is 396 meters, the width is 34 meters. At the vicinity of the Liteyny Bridge, the Neva river reaches the maximum depth of 24 meters.

== Location ==
Upstream there is the Bolsheokhtinsky bridge, below the Troitsky bridge and Sampsonievsky bridge (across Bolshaya Nevka). The nearest metro stations are Chernyshevskaya and Lenin Square.

== Name ==
The bridge is named Liteyney which literally means Foundry after the Liteyny Prospekt and Liteyny district which in turn were named after the large foundry that was established on the left bank in 1711. In 1879 the bridge was renamed Aleksandrovsky in name of tzar Alexander II. But this name was never adopted by the public and after the October Revolution in 1917 the original name Liteyny Bridge was restored.

== History ==
The ancient maps reveal that even before the city was founded, there was a crossing on the way from Russia to Sweden approximately at the location of the modern bridge. At one bank of the river the road from Novgorod ended, and at the other bank the road to Vyborg started.

The decision to build a permanent bridge was made after rough ice destroyed the temporary floating bridge on April 4, 1865. Although similar events had happened in the past, this particular one caused strong reaction from the government, and a special expert commission was created. But it took until 1869 to agree on the location for the bridge. On April 22, 1871 an open contest was declared, and total of 17 proposals were submitted. As a result of the contest, the project under the Vestminster banner was chosen by the city authorities. However, the transport ministry rejected it and created an expert commission of its own and declared the winner to be engineer colonel A. Struve who was one of the members of the commission.

The building of the new bridge started on August 30, 1875. The work conditions were difficult, and during the next four years there were two fatal accidents, killing 14 people. The official opening ceremony took place on October 1, 1879. Struve was promoted to the rank of Major General.

Soon after the opening, the bridge was equipped with electrical lights - the invention of Russian inventor Pavel Yablochkov. It was the first bridge to get electrical lighting and for the long time it remained the only one, since the monopoly of gas producers in city opposed it.

== See also ==
- List of bridges in Saint Petersburg

== Liteyny Bridge in art ==
- [[:|"Liteyny Bridge", 1982]], by Leningrad artist Alexander Mikhailovich Semionov (1922 - 1984)
