= Mga (river) =

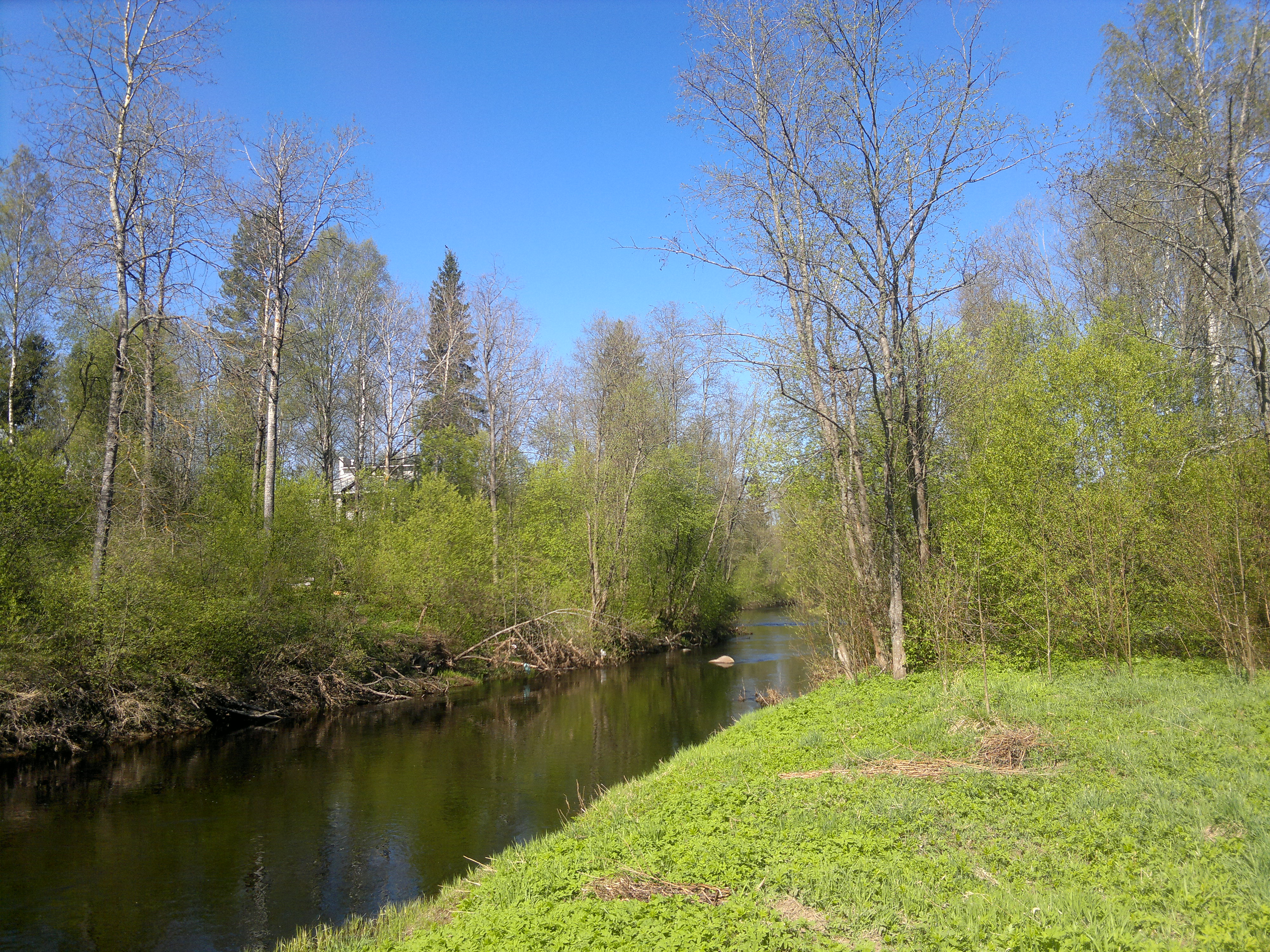

Location
- Country: Russia

Physical characteristics
- Mouth: Neva
  - coordinates: 59°48′44″N 30°54′7″E
- Length: 93 km (58 mi)
- Basin size: 754 km^{2} (291 sq mi)

Basin features
- Progression: Neva→ Gulf of Finland

The Mga (Russian: Мга) is a river in Kirovsky and Tosnensky Districts of Leningrad Oblast in northwestern Russia. Mga is a left tributary of the Neva. The urban-type settlements of Mga and Pavlovo are located on the river. The length of the Mga is 93 kilometres (58 mi), and the area of its basin is 754 square kilometres (291 mi^{2}). The principal tributaries of the Mga are the Beryozovka (right) and the Voytolovka (left).

The source of the Mga is in the swamps in the southeastern part of Kirovsky District, south of the settlement of Naziya. The river flows southwest, reaches the border between Kirovsky and Tosnensky Districts, turns northwest, and a stretch of it forms the district border. North of the village of Yerzunovo the Mga leaves the district border and returns to Kirovsky District. The river passes the urban-type settlement of Mga and has its mouth in the eastern part of the urban-type settlement of Pavlovo.

The drainage basin of the Mga comprises areas in the southeastern part of Kirovsky District and in the eastern part of Tosnensky District.
