= Varshavsky railway station =

Former railway station in St. Petersburg, Russia

Coordinates: 59.9077°N 30.3072°E

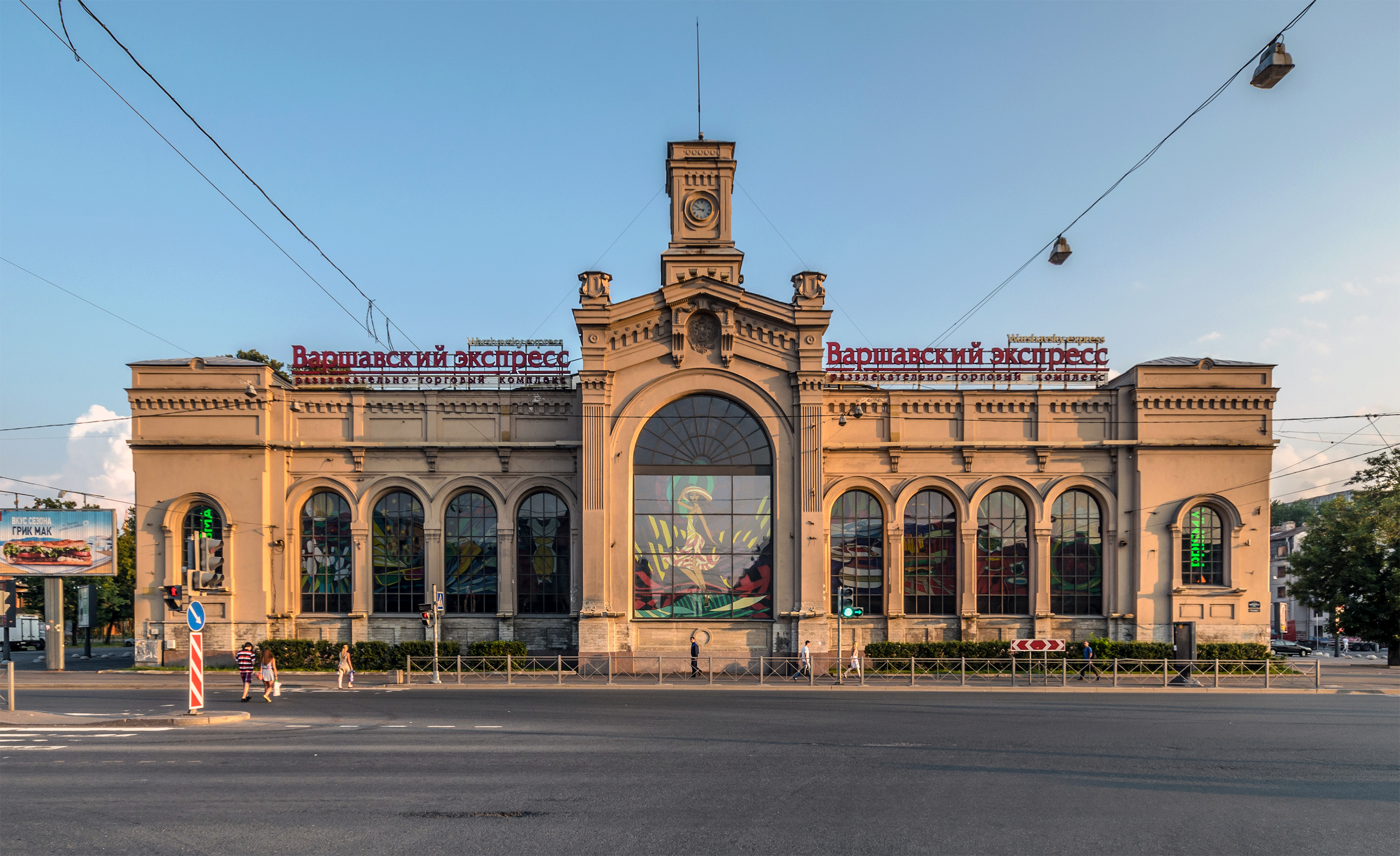
The facade of the former railway station

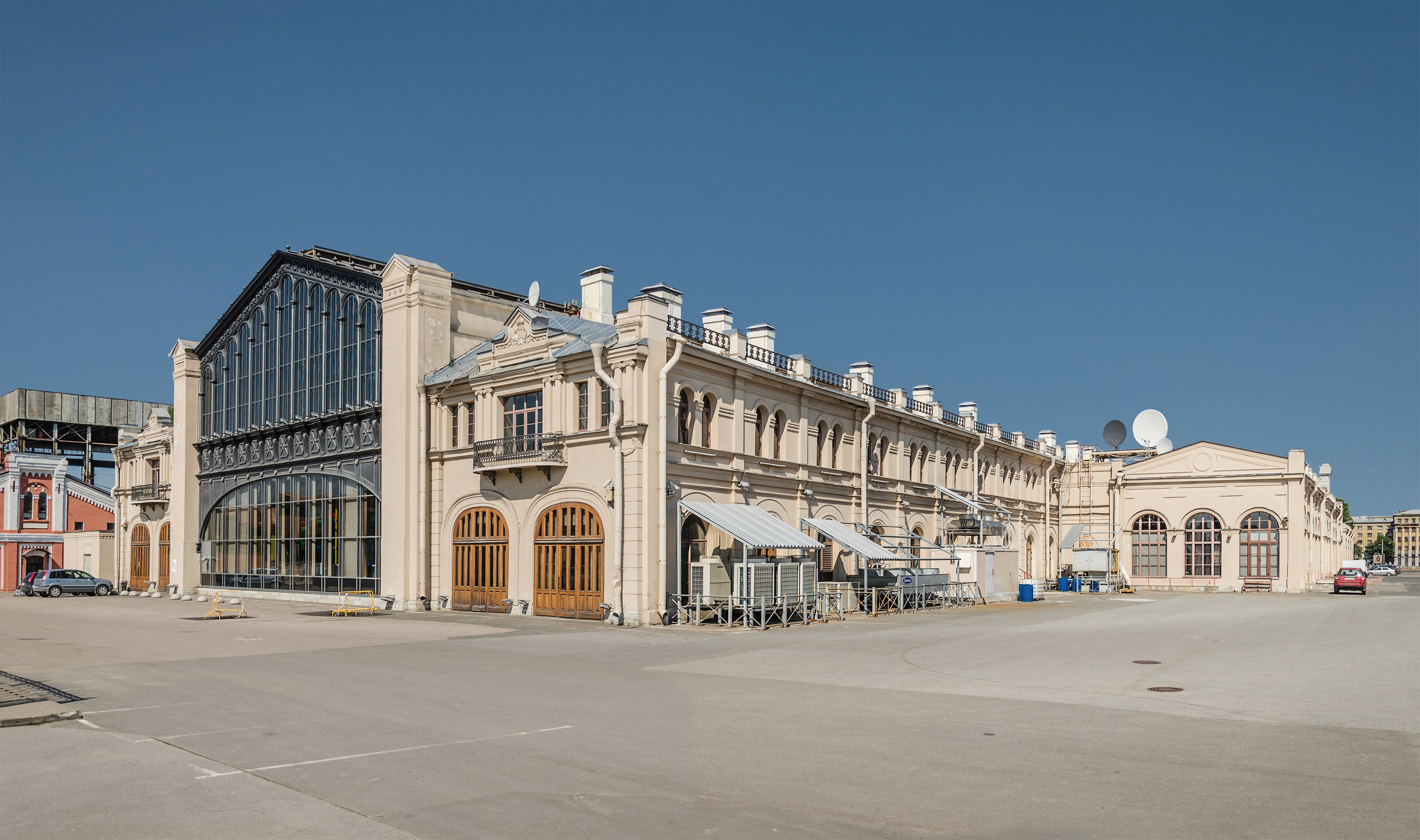
Varshavsky station, view from the former track area

Varshavsky station (Russian: Варша́вский вокза́л, Varshavsky vokzal), or Warsaw station, is a former passenger railway station in Saint Petersburg, Russia. It is located by the Obvodny Canal to the south of the city centre. The historic terminus of the Saint Petersburg–Warsaw Railway, it was in operation from 1853 to 2001. From 2001 to 2017, it served as the home of the Russian Railway Museum (also known as the Russian Federation Central Museum of Railway Transport). Today, it is an architectural monument, used as a shopping and entertainment complex.

== History ==
The station was originally built in 1851 for a rail line, completed in 1858, from the city to the Tsar's residence in Gatchina. The line was extended in 1859 to Pskov and in 1862 to Warsaw, which at that time was a part of Congress Poland and the Russian Empire. A branch from the main line that ran to the Prussian border at Virbalis (now Lithuania) connected Saint Petersburg to other capitals of Europe.

The current building was designed by Piotr Salmanovich in a mixture of historical styles. It was constructed between 1857 and 1860. A church was built in front of the station in 1908; it was later demolished and a Lenin statue by Soviet sculptor Nikolai Tomsky appeared in 1949.

In 2001, the station was closed, with long distance rail service diverted to Vitebsky railway station and commuter service to Baltiysky Rail Terminal, and the depiction of Lenin removed. The trade center Warsaw Express has occupied the building since 2005.

On the tracks, a railway museum used to display 80 exhibits of steam engines, electric and diesel locomotives. The Museum is closed, and the exhibits have been relocated to the Russian Railway Museum adjacent to Baltiysky railway station, which opened on 1 November 2017.

== Future ==
The train depot of the Ladozhsky station is now proposed at the former Varshavsky station track area.

== See also ==
- The Museum of the Moscow Railway, at Paveletsky railway station, Moscow
- Rizhsky railway station, Home of the Moscow Railway Museum
- History of rail transport in Russia
- List of railway museums (worldwide)
- Heritage railways
- List of heritage railways
- Restored trains
- Finland Station, St.Petersburg
- Emperor railway station in Pushkin town
- List of Russian steam locomotive classes
- Tsarskoye Selo Railway
- Ladozhsky railway station: The successor of the Varshavsky station.

== Sources ==
- (in Russian) Reconstruction of the Warsaw Railway Station
