= Saint Isaac's Bridge =

Former bridge in Saint Petersburg, Russia

Coordinates: 59.938107°N 30.300127°E

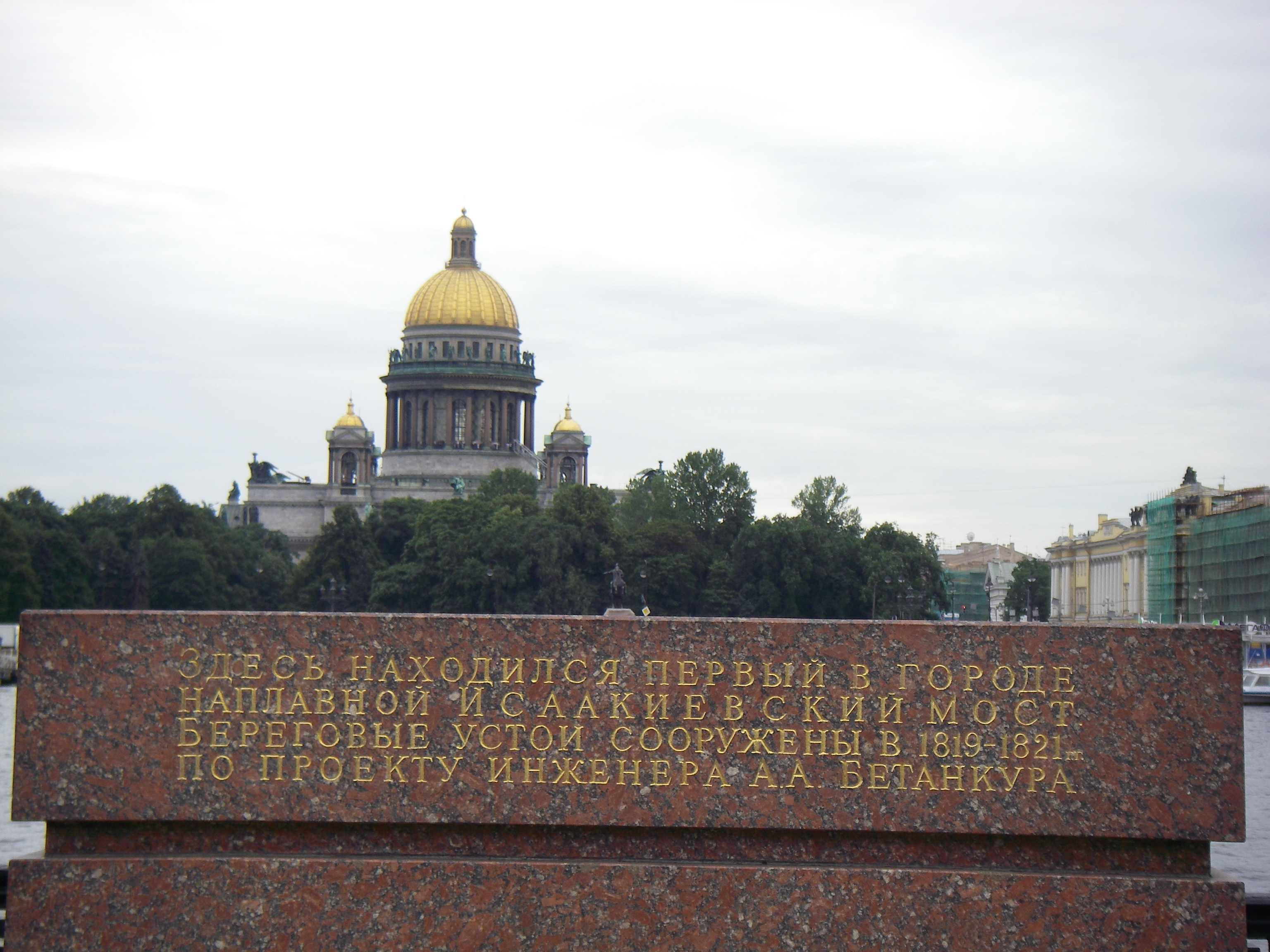
A sign marking the place of the former bridge.

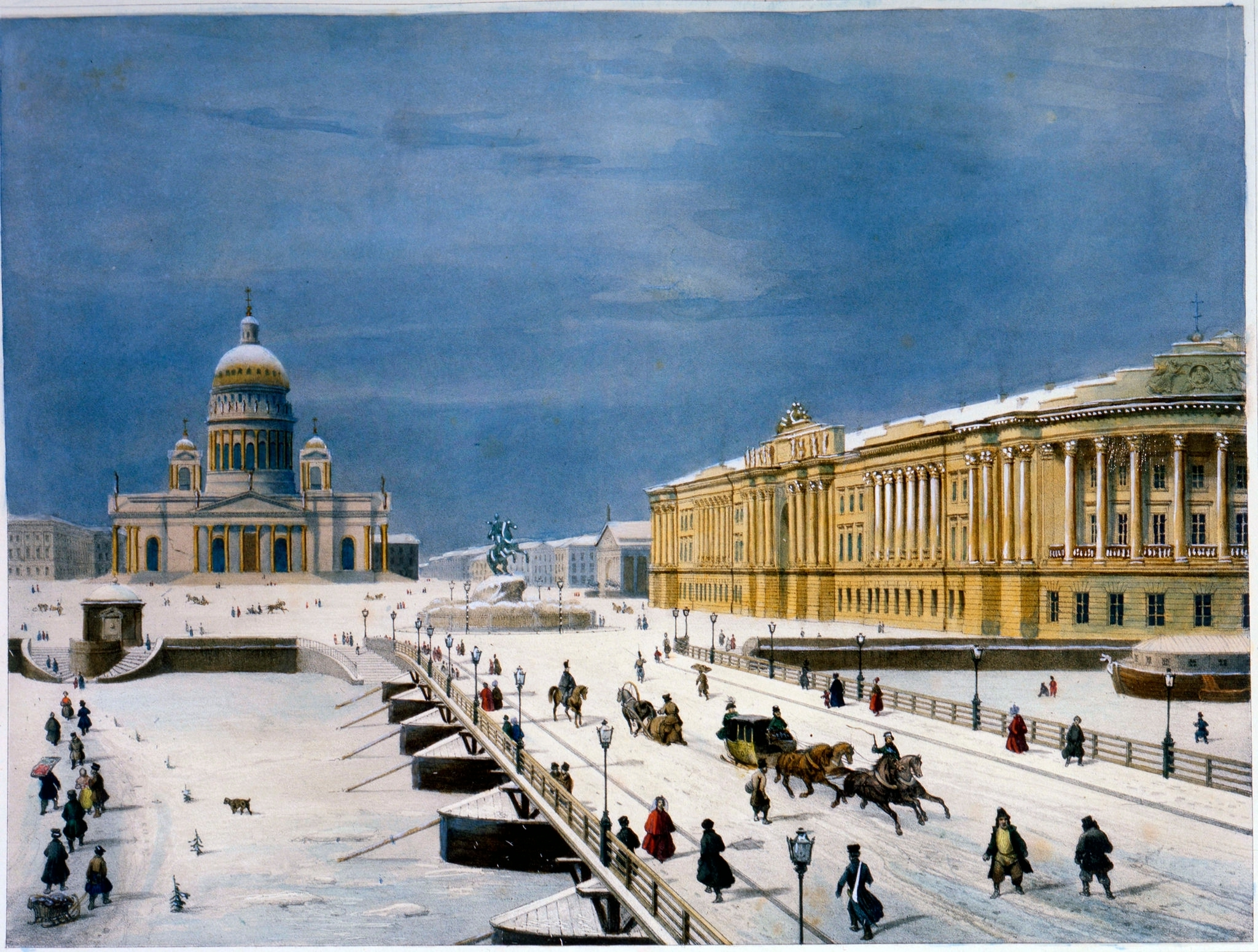
The bridge in 1830s

Isaakievsky pontoon bridge (Saint Isaac's Bridge) was the first bridge across Neva river in St.Petersburg, by then the capital of Russian Empire. It was first constructed in 1727. Starting from 1732 it was rebuilt each summer for a period of 184 years. The bridge was named after the nearby Saint Isaac's Cathedral. Between 1856 and 1912 construction was shifted to the spot of today's Palace Bridge.

The gale of 1733 shattered the bridge, sinking the barques supporting it. After this the bridge was supported by special-design heavy-duty pontoons.

In 1916 a passing tugboat sent a spark that caused a fire on the wooden structures and the bridge perished in flames.

The former construction spot of the bridge is distinguished today by bank abutments fettled with granite steps leading down to the water.
