= Kirovsk, Leningrad Oblast =

Town in Leningrad Oblast, Russia

Kirovsk Кировск
- Town
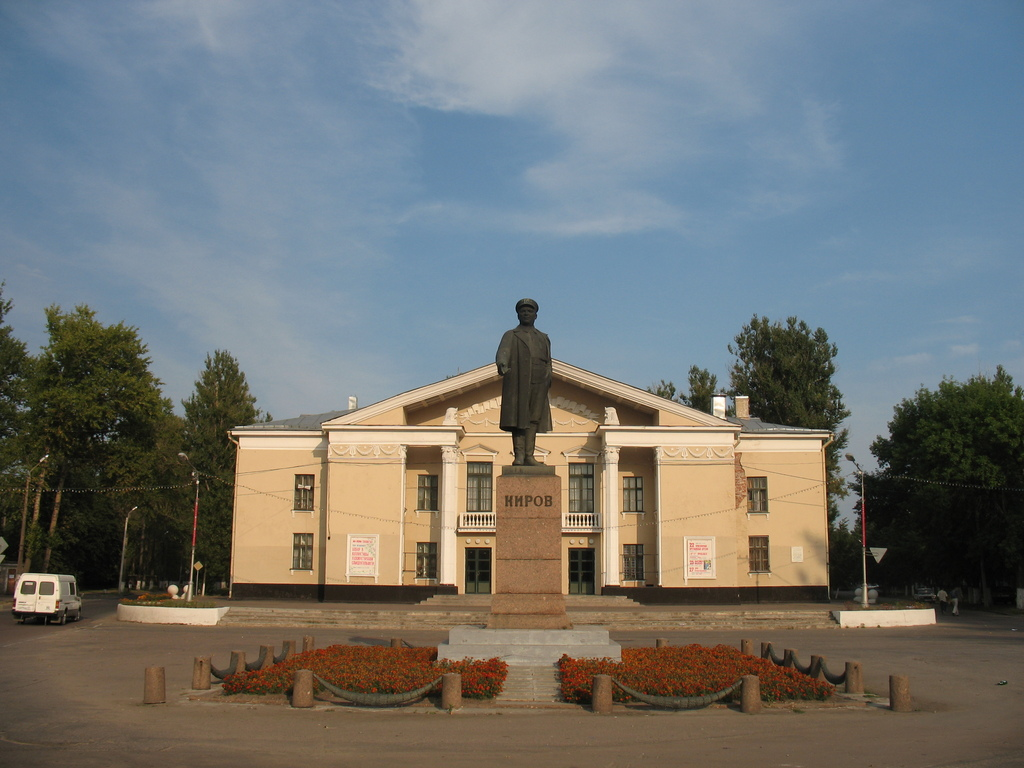
- Monument to Sergey Kirov in Kirovsk

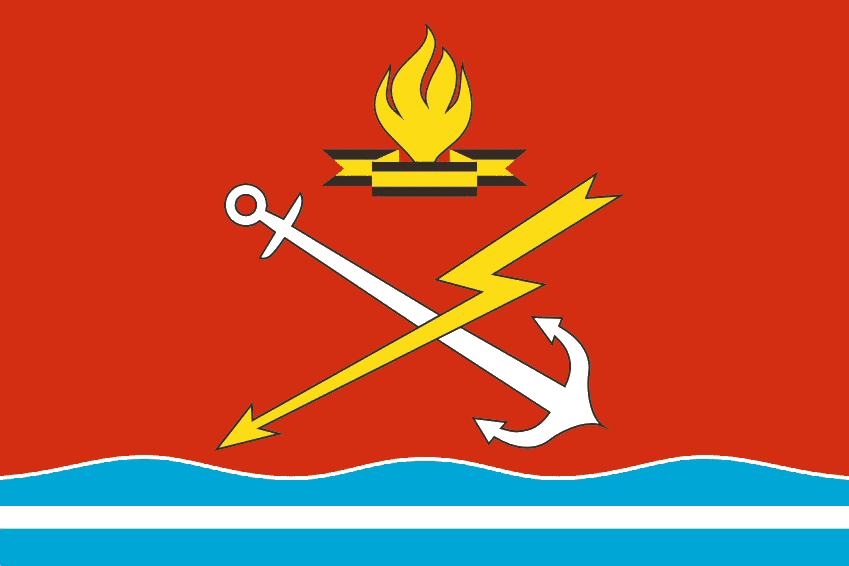
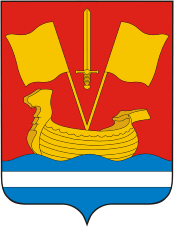
- Flag Coat of arms
- Interactive map of Kirovsk
- Location of Kirovsk Kirovsk (Leningrad Oblast)
- Coordinates: 59°52′N 30°59′E
- Country: Russia
- Federal subject: Leningrad Oblast
- Administrative district: Kirovsky District
- Settlement municipal formationSelsoviet: Kirovskoye Settlement Municipal Formation
- Founded: 1929
- Town status since: 1953
- Elevation: 20 m (66 ft)

Population (2010 Census)
  - Total: 25,650
  - Estimate (2024): 26,986 (+5.2%)

Administrative status
  - Capital of: Kirovsky District, Kirovskoye Settlement Municipal Formation

Municipal status
  - Municipal district: Kirovsky Municipal District
  - Urban settlement: Kirovskoye Urban Settlement
  - Capital of: Kirovsky Municipal District, Kirovskoye Urban Settlement
- Time zone: UTC+3 (MSK)
- Postal codes: 187340–187344, 187349
- OKTMO ID: 41625101001
- Website: www.kirovsklenobl.ru

Kirovsk (Russian: Ки́ровск) is a town and the administrative center of Kirovsky District in Leningrad Oblast, Russia, located on the left bank of the Neva River, 33 kilometers (21 mi) east of St. Petersburg. Population: 25,650 (2010 census); 24,361 (2002 census); 23,655 (1989 Soviet census).

== History ==
Sergey Kirov founded Kirovsk in 1929 as the settlement of Nevdubstroy (Невдубстрой) in order to serve the nearby 8th Sergey Kirov Power Station. At the time Nevdubstroy formed part of Mginsky District with its administrative center in the settlement of Mga. The district remained a part of the Leningrad Okrug of Leningrad Oblast until August 15, 1930, when the okrugs were abolished as well, and the districts were directly subordinated to the oblast. On January 21, 1931 the settlement of Nevdubstroy was transferred to Leningradsky Prigorodny District. On May 20, 1936 it was granted urban-type settlement status and renamed rabochiy poselok pri 8-y GES imeni Kirova (рабочий поселок при 8-й ГЭС имени Кирова); the name was later shortened to rabochiy poselok imeni Kirova (Russian: рабочий поселок имени Кирова, lit. 'Kirov workers' settlement'). On August 19, 1936, when Leningradsky Prigorodny District was abolished, the settlement transferred back to Mginsky District. Between September 1941 and January 1944, during World War II, German troops occupied the settlement. The settlement was renamed Kirovsk - after Sergey Kirov (1886–1934) - and granted town status on November 5, 1953.

On December 9, 1960, Mginsky District was abolished and split between Volkhovsky and Tosnensky Districts. Kirovsk transferred to Tosnensky District. On February 1, 1963, it became a town of oblast significance. On April 1, 1977, Kirovsky District was established by splitting areas off from Volkhovsky and Tosnensky Districts, with the administrative center in Kirovsk, essentially in the limits of the former Mginsky District. In 2010 the administrative structure of Leningrad Oblast was harmonized with its municipal structure, and Kirovsk became a town of district significance.

== Administrative and municipal status ==
Within the framework of administrative divisions, Kirovsk serves as the administrative center of Kirovsky District. As an administrative division, it is, together with the settlement of Molodtsovo, incorporated within Kirovsky District as Kirovskoye Settlement Municipal Formation. As a municipal division, Kirovskoye Settlement Municipal Formation is incorporated within Kirovsky Municipal District as Kirovskoye Urban Settlement.

== Economy and infrastructure ==
The town consists of the Old Town built in the 1950s and Ladoga, the part built during the Soviet construction boom of the 1980s. The main industries suffered severely during the 1990s. Most people try to find work in the nearby St. Petersburg.

Kirovsk has four high schools, a music school and a hospital, but no maternity ward. The main employers are the Ladoga plant (which manufactured Soviet nuclear submarine equipment until it switched to machine parts and electronics), Dubrovsky Zavod and the 8th Power Station. Because of these industries, Kirovsk was in Soviet times considered a closed town.

Kirovsk (Nevdubstroy railway station) is connected by railway to Mga. There are several direct suburban trains to St. Petersburg's Moskovsky railway station and Ladozhsky railway station.

The A120 highway, which encircles St. Petersburg, passes Kirovsk. The M18 Highway, which connects St. Petersburg and Murmansk, passes several kilometres north of the town. The Neva River is navigable.

Kirovsk is home to the Diorama, which is housed inside the Ladozhsky Bridge over the Neva River. The site, otherwise known as "The Road of Life", commemorates Kirovsk's role as being the sole entry point for goods destined for Leningrad when Nazi German troops besieged the city during World War II.

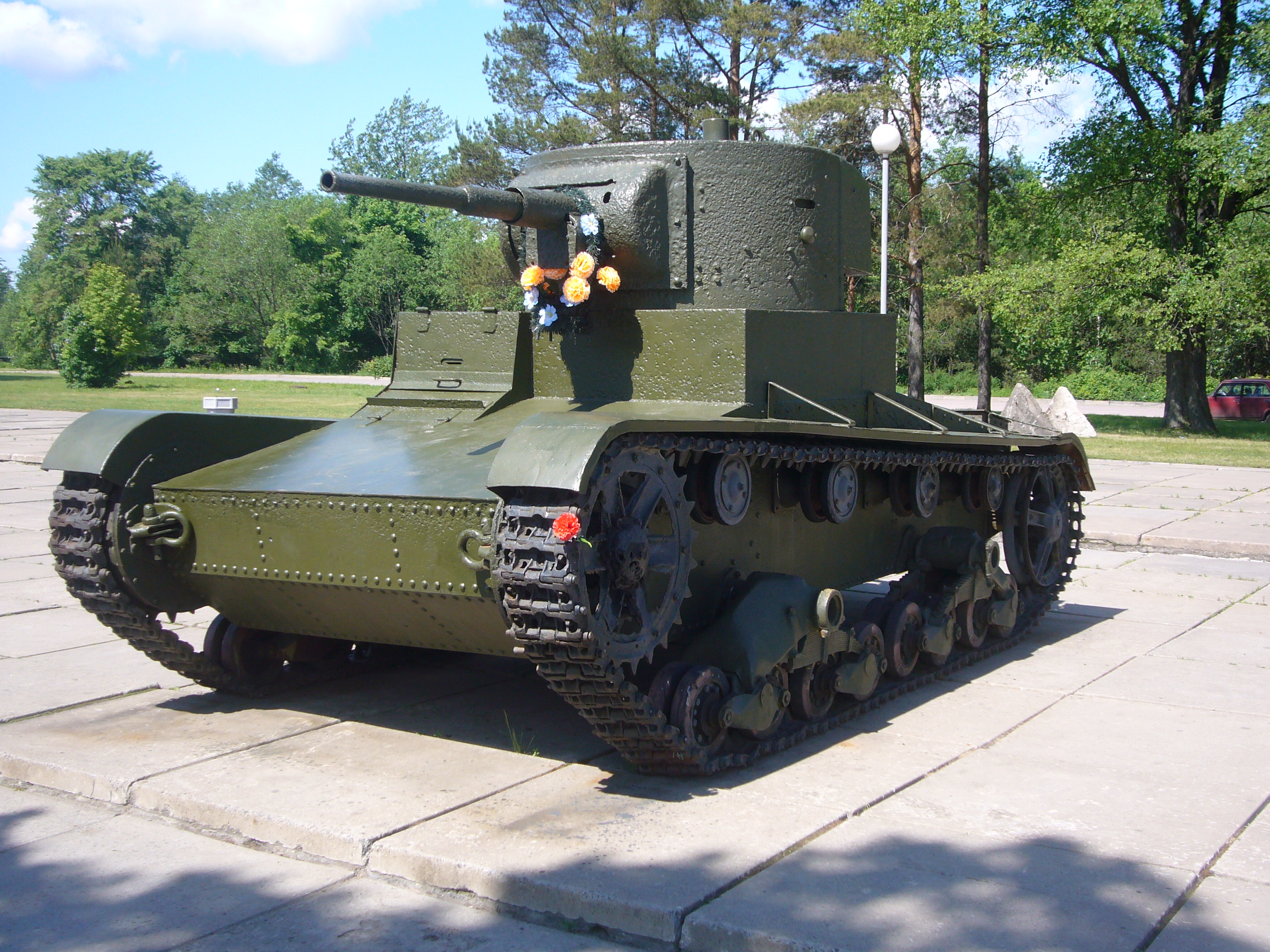
A T-26 tank at Diorama
