= Ladozhsky Bridge =

Bridge in Leningrad, Russia

Coordinates: 59.908°N 30.987°E

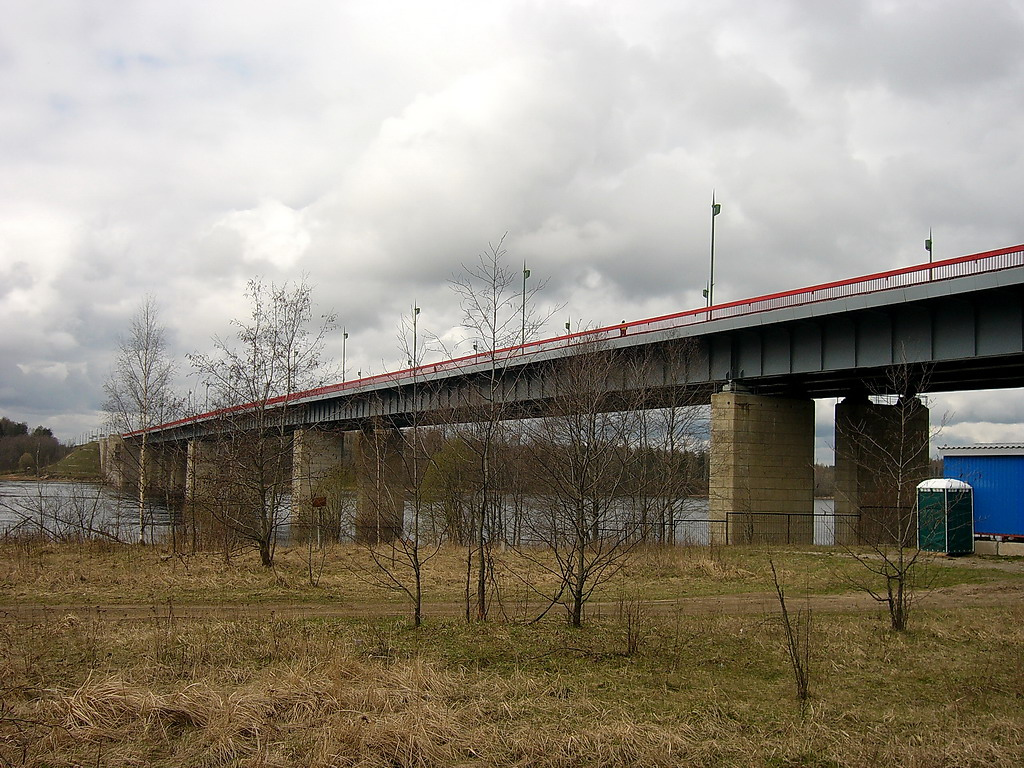
Ladozhsky Bridge

Ladozhsky Bridge (Russian: Ла́дожский мост) is uppermost bridge across the Neva River. It is located in Leningrad Oblast, near Kirovsk. It is a part of Murmansk Highway (M18 highway). The bridge was built between 1978 and 1983, although one half of the bridge was opened to traffic in 1981 prior to the full opening.
