= Palace Bridge =

Bridge in Saint Petersburg, Russia

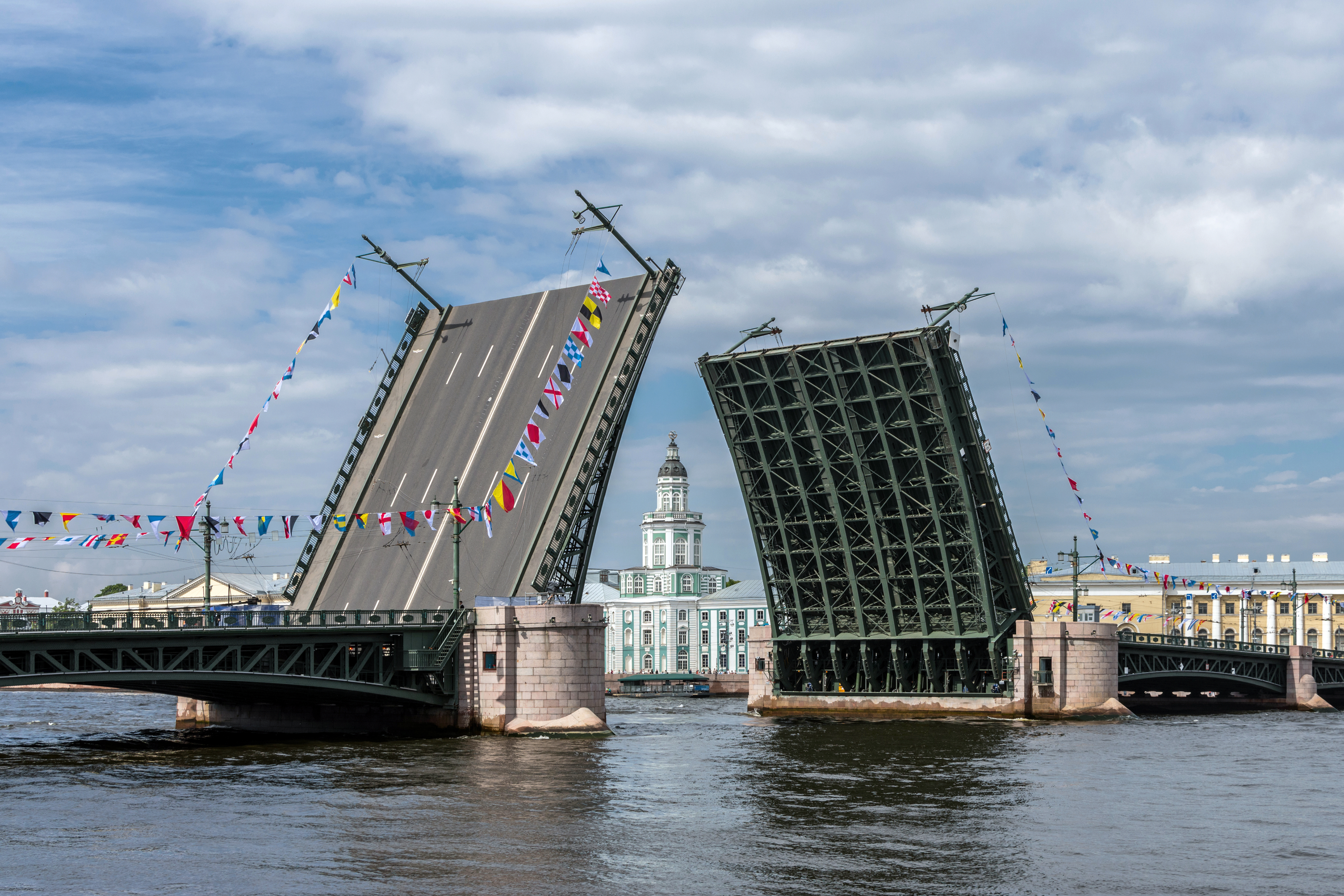
- The Palace Bridge—a rare case of raising the bridge in the daytime
- Coordinates: 59.941149°N 30.308105°E
- Crosses: Neva River
- Locale: Saint Petersburg

Characteristics
- Design: Bascule bridge
- Total length: 260.1 meters
- Width: 27.8 metres

History
- Opened: December 23, 1916

Location
- Interactive map of Palace Bridge

Palace Bridge (Russian: Дворцо́вый мост, romanized: Dvortsoviy Most), a road- and foot-traffic bascule bridge, spans the Neva River in Saint Petersburg between Palace Square and Vasilyevsky Island. Like every other Neva bridge (except for Bolshoy Obukhovsky Bridge), it is drawn by night, making foot travel between various parts of the city virtually impossible. The bascule span was designed by an American firm, the Scherzer Rolling Lift Bridge Company, and built by the French firm Société de Construction des Batignolles between 1912 and 1916.

The total length of Palace Bridge is 260.1 metres, width is 27.8 metres. It is actually composed of five spans, the southernmost joining Palace Embankment between the Winter Palace and the Admiralty and leading to Palace Square.

== History ==
After Emperor Nicholas I lifted Peter the Great's prohibition to construct bridges across the Neva, a temporary pontoon bridge was set up about 50 metres downstream from the current structure.

Construction of the cast-iron bridge was started in 1912 to designs by Andrey Pshenitsky, but the work was delayed by World War I and the bridge was not opened to the public until December 23, 1916. The history leading up to the construction of this bridge was tortuous with 54 proposed designs rejected between 1901 and 1911. The design was subject to strict controls so as to prevent the bridge from obstructing the view from Palace Embankment towards Kunstkammer, Imperial Academy of Arts, and other structures on Vasilievsky Island.

During the October Revolution the bridge was singled out as one of the principal sites to be occupied by the insurrectionists in order to control the city, it was taken without any fighting.

A year after its inauguration, the bridge was renamed Republican Bridge (Russian: Республика́нский мост), but the original name was restored in 1952. Various improvements and embellishments of the structure continued well into the Soviet times. In 1967, the bridge was repaired. The tramway tracks were removed in 1998.

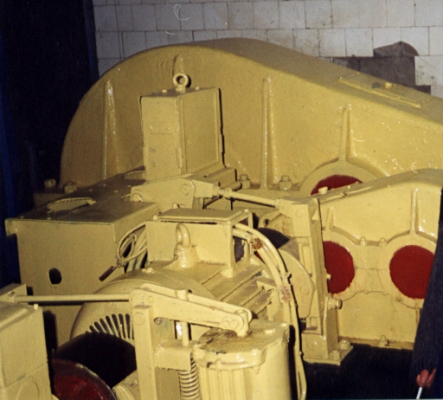
One of the motors used to open the bridge

== Drawing mechanism ==
The engine which opens up 700 ton of each bridge flights consists of motors, huge gears (some of which are still the original ones) and thousand-ton counterweights. The mechanism works reliably, but sometimes small incidents occur. In October 2002 one of the gear teeth broke off: consequently the drawing was halted in the middle, and ship passage was delayed.

== Gallery ==
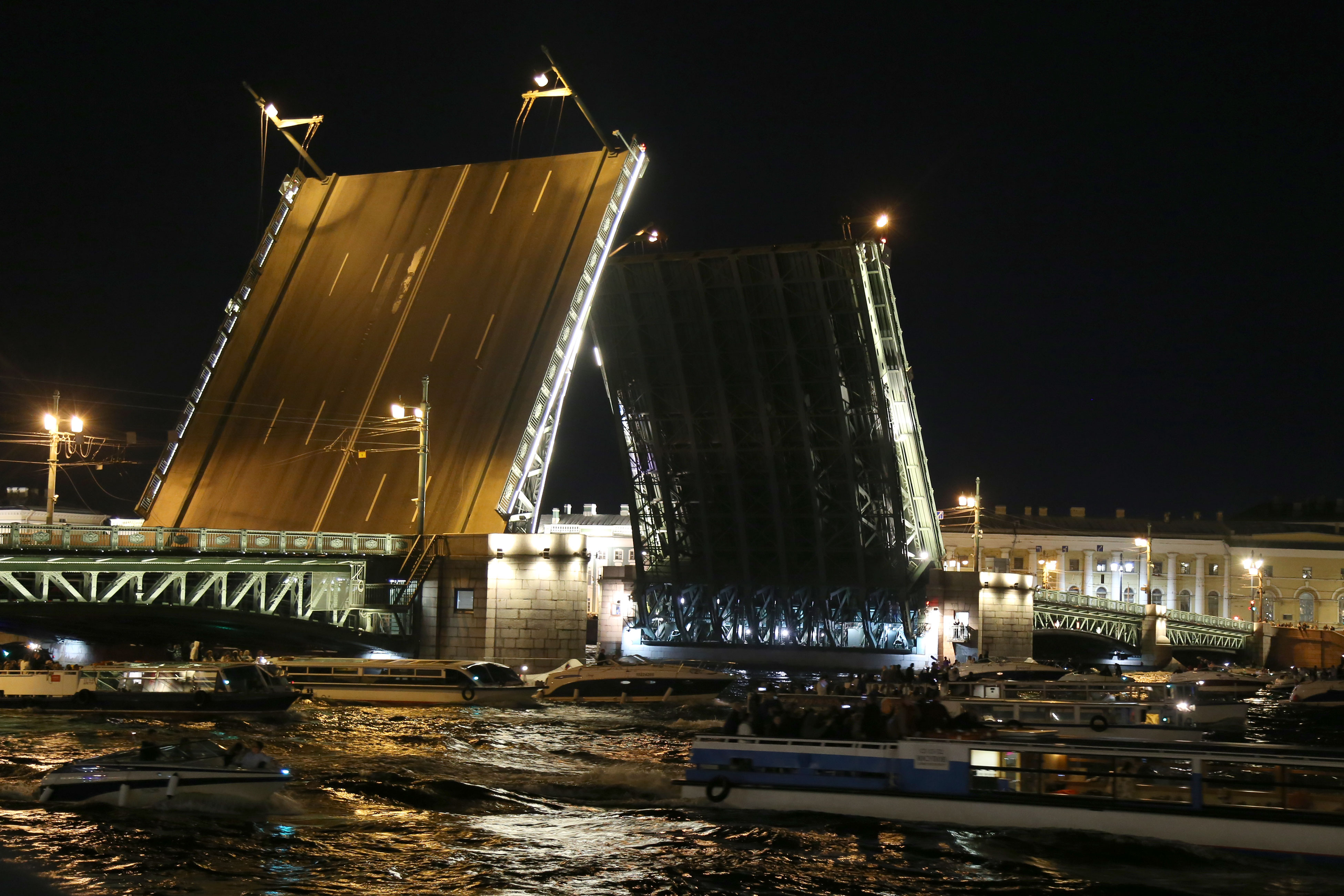
Palace Bridge at night

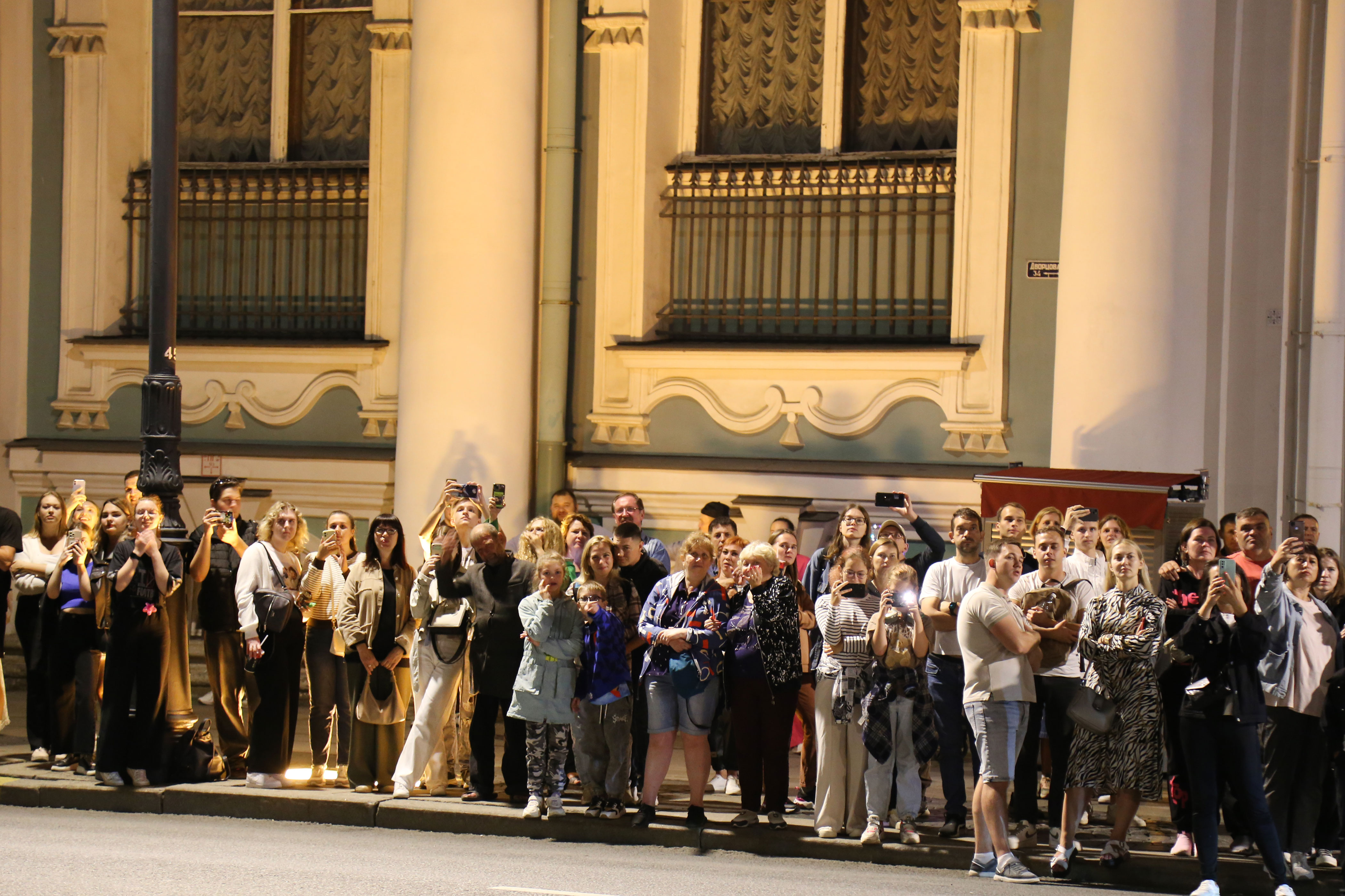
State Hermitage Museum near Palace Bridge

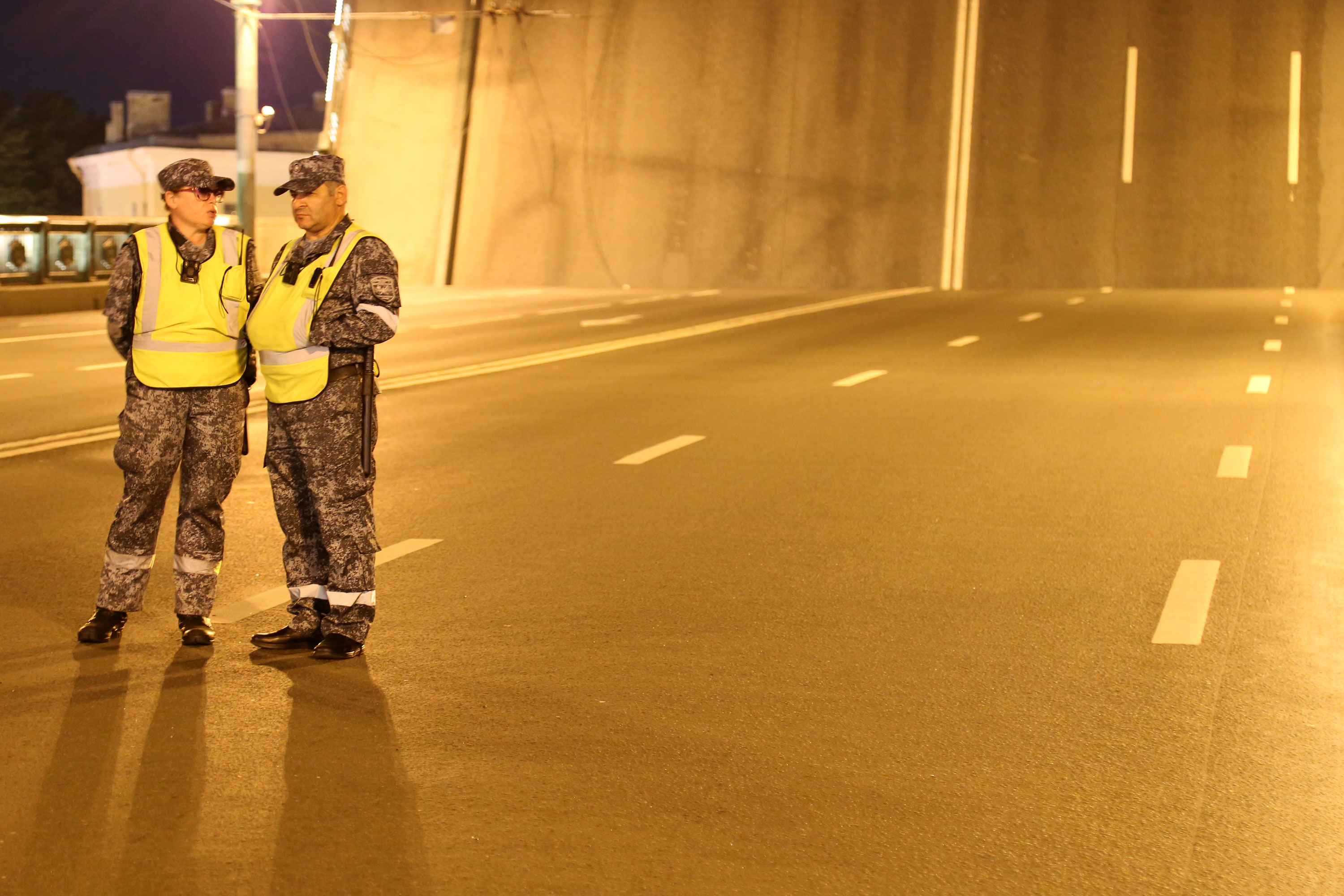
Guards near Palace Bridge

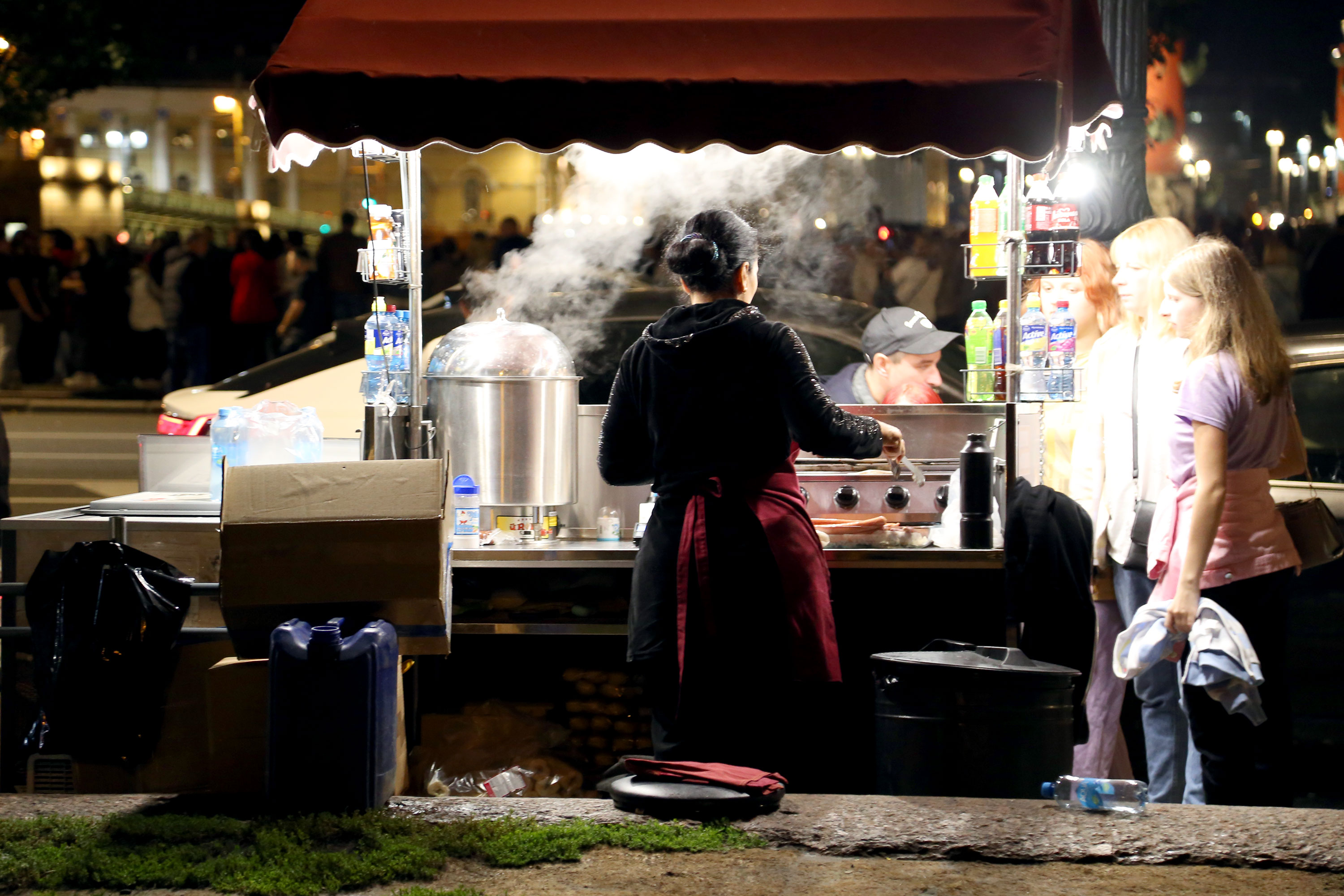
Street vendor near Palace Bridge

== See also ==
- List of bridges in Saint Petersburg
