= Ladozhsky railway station =

Railway station in St. Petersburg, Russia

St. Petersburg–Ladozhsky Санкт-Петербург–Ладожский
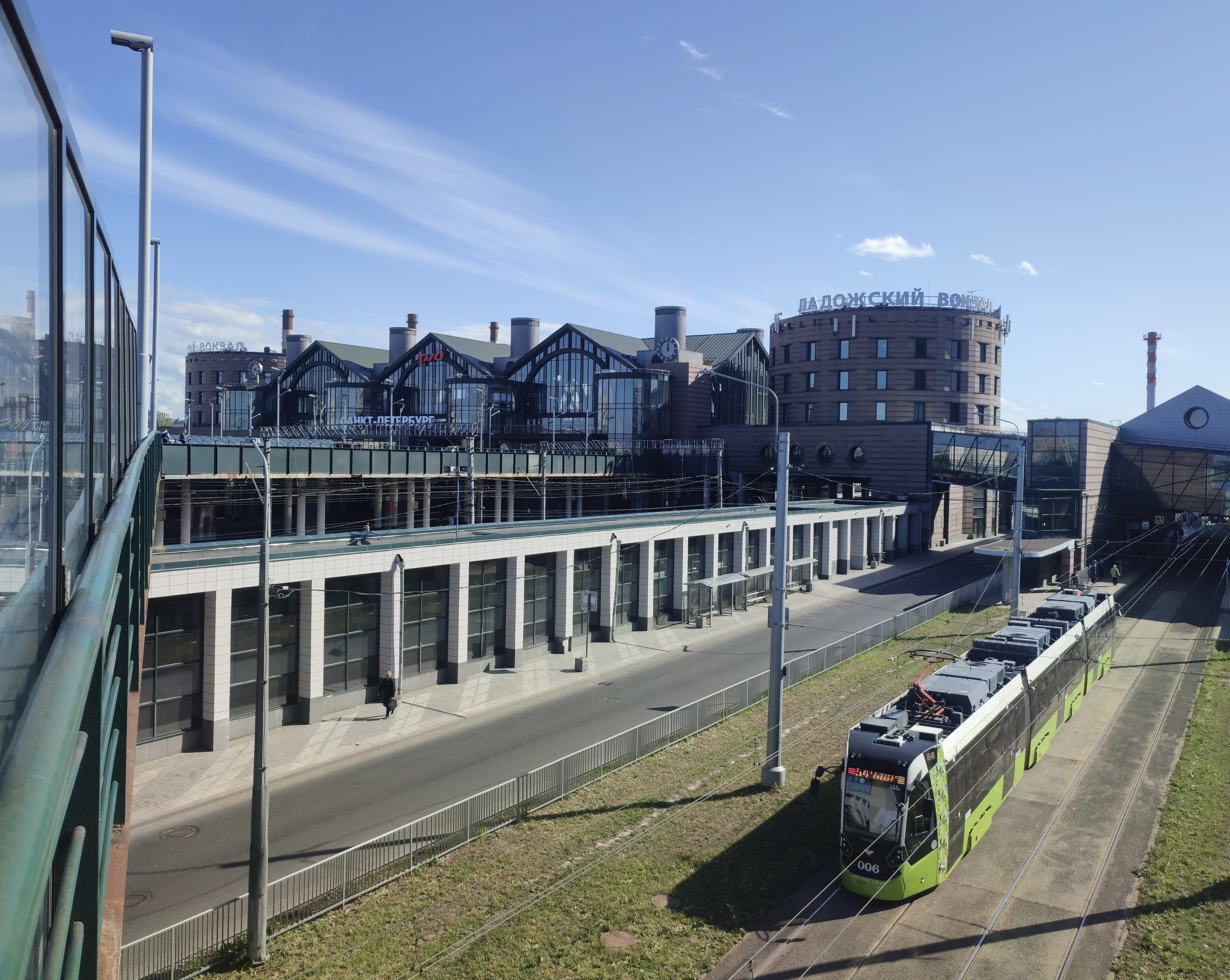
- Ladozhsky railway station 20 years after construction

General information
- Location: 73, Zanevsky Prospekt, St. Petersburg, Russia
- Coordinates: 59.9316°N 30.4417°E
- System: St Petersburg-Ladozhsky
- Platforms: 4
- Tracks: 7
- Connections: Saint Petersburg Metro station: Ladozhskaya

Construction
- Structure type: At-grade
- Parking: Yes

Other information
- Station code: 037109
- Fare zone: 0

History
- Opened: 2003

Services
Preceding station	Russian Railways	Following station
Saint Petersburg–Finlyandsky towards Helsinki	Tolstoy	Tver towards Moscow Leningradsky
Location

St. Petersburg–Ladozhsky (Russian: Ла́дожский вокза́л), is the newest and most modern passenger railway station in Saint Petersburg, Russia, opened in 2003. It is the only major through station in the city, the other 4 are termini. It serves routes to the north and east previously served by Moskovsky railway station, as well as some lines previously served by Finland Station, Vitebsky station and Baltiysky station. Some trains originating in Moscow and bound for other cities via Saint Petersburg also use the station.

Map of railway lines around Ladozhsky railway station

== History ==
Initial plans for construction were formed at the end of the 1980s intended to replace Varshavsky station, but the project was shelved. Construction began on the station in 2001 and was completed in 2003. The new station, designed by architect Nikita Yavein, is one of the largest in Russia with a capacity of up to 50 commuter departures and 26 long distance departures accommodating 4,500 passengers per hour.

Built at a cost of nine billion rubles (USD 300 million), the station opened in 2003 for the 300th anniversary of the city's founding. President of Russia Vladimir Putin was on the opening the new station in his hometown.

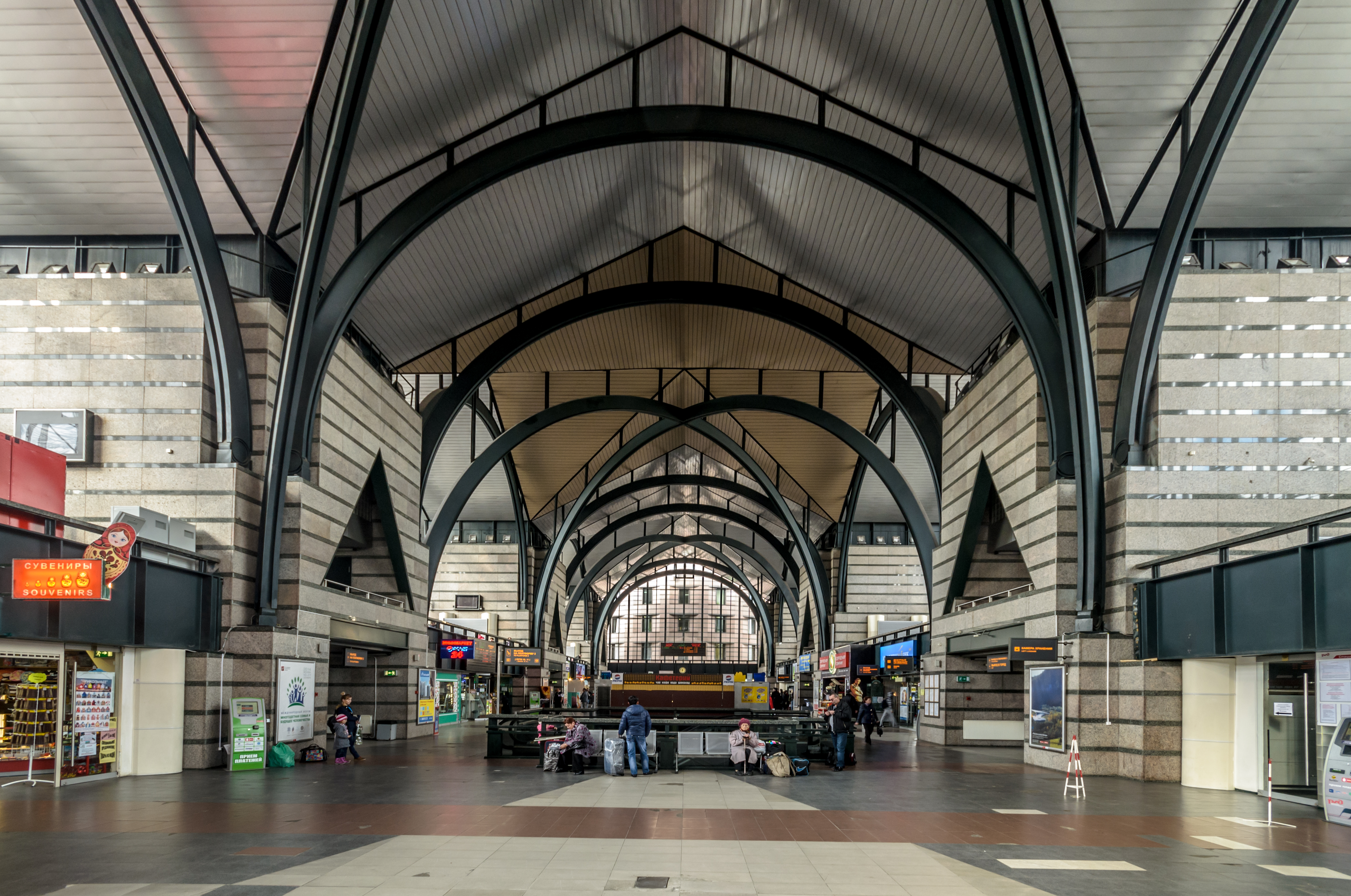
The station's ticket and waiting hall

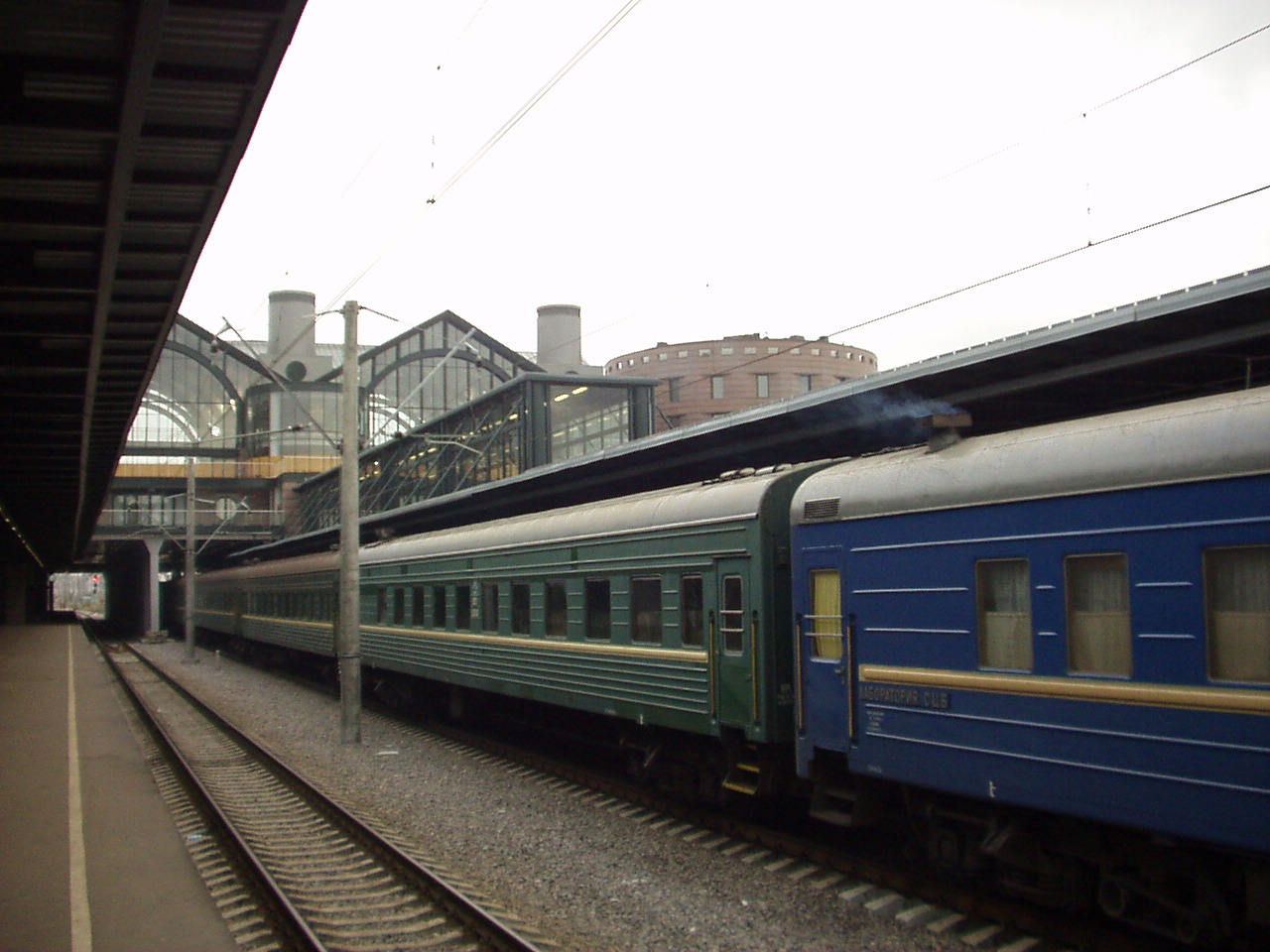
Platforms at the Ladozhsky station

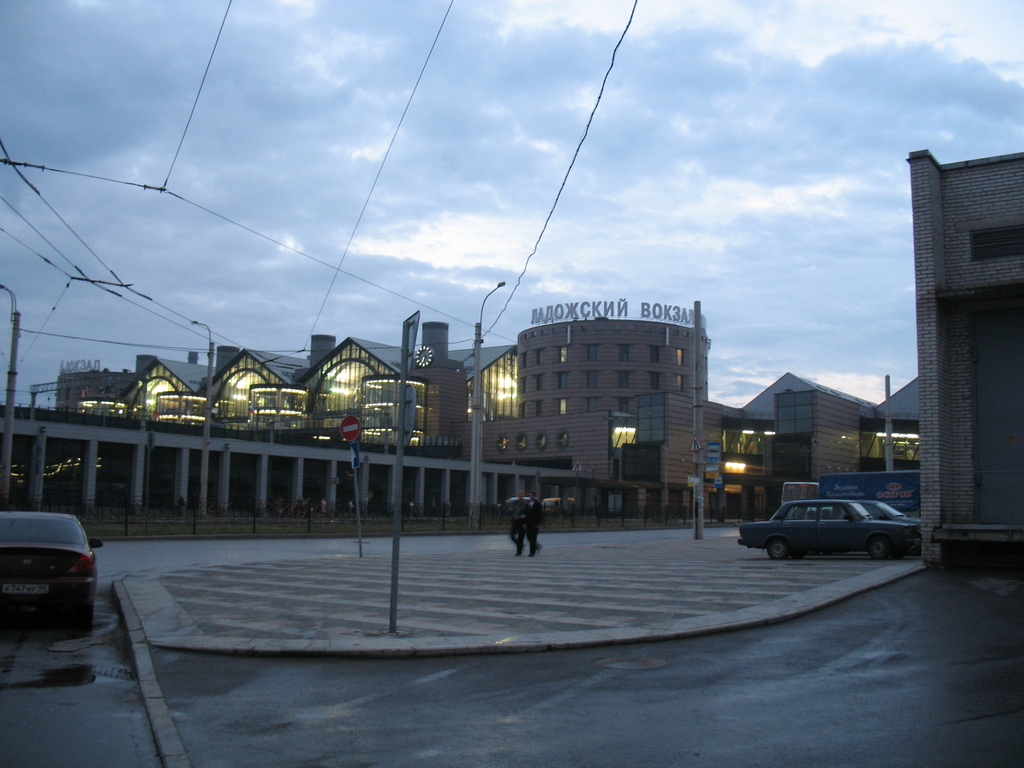
Ladozhsky station

== Future ==
- Construction of additional tracks 13-16.
- Construction of 2 new extra-long low-level side platforms along tracks 3 and 16.
- Construction of train storage facility at the former Varshavsky station track area.
