= Lebyazhye, Lomonosovsky District, Leningrad Oblast =

Lebyazhye Лебяжье
- Urban-type settlement
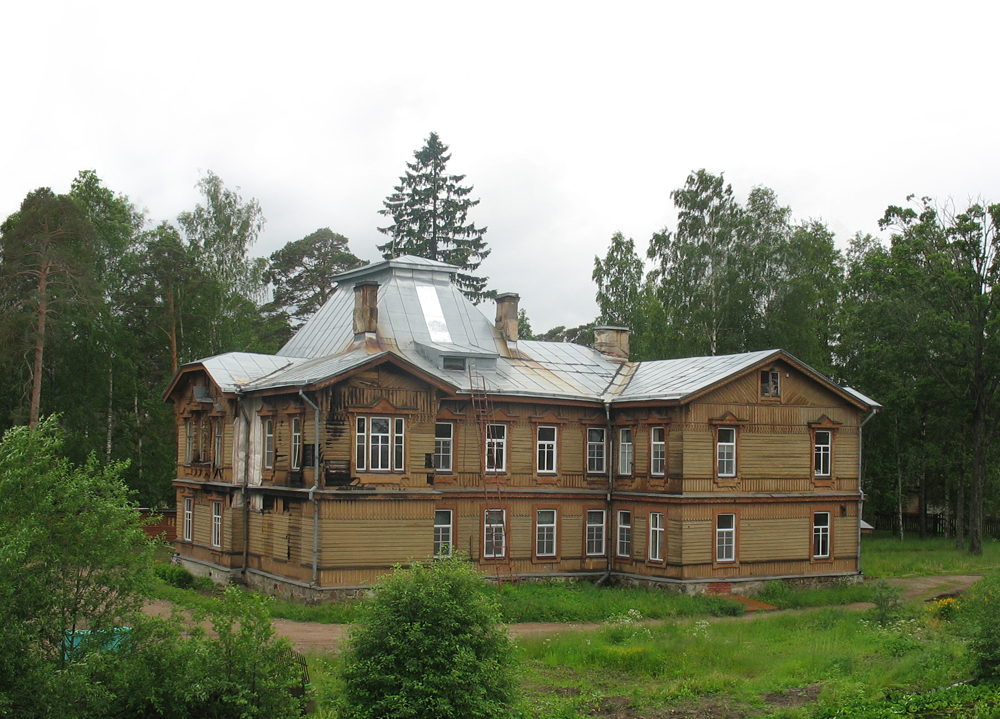
- Saint Nicholas Church
- Interactive map of Lebyazhye
- Location of Lebyazhye Lebyazhye (Leningrad Oblast)
- Coordinates: 59°57′50″N 29°25′16″E
- Country: Russia
- Federal subject: Leningrad Oblast
- Administrative district: Lomonosovsky District
- Urban-type settlement status since: November 22, 1966

Population (2010 Census)
  - Total: 4,729
  - Estimate (2024): 5,160 (+9.1%)

Municipal status
  - Municipal district: Lomonosovsky Municipal District
  - Urban settlement: Lebyazhenskoye Urban Settlement
  - Capital of: Lebyazhenskoye Urban Settlement
- Time zone: UTC+3 (MSK)
- Postal code: 188532
- Dialing code: +7 81376
- OKTMO ID: 41630162051
- Website: www.lebiaje.ru/news.php

Lebyazhye (Russian: Лебя́жье; Finnish: Lepäsi) is an urban locality (an urban-type settlement) in Lomonosovsky District of Leningrad Oblast, Russia, located on the coast of the Gulf of Finland 25 kilometers (16 mi) west of Lomonosov and 30 kilometers (19 mi) east of Sosnovy Bor. Population: 4,729 (2010 census); 5,600 (2002 census); 5,340 (1989 Soviet census).

== History ==
Lebyazhye was first mentioned in 1500 as Karkila. A variant of the current name first appears in 1504/1505 in reference to the nearby Lebyazhya river, likely being a translation of an original Ingrian Joutsenoja, with joutsen and лебедь both meaning "swan". The name Joutsenoja is attested in Swedish sources (Joutzen oia) since 1616 as a village name. The Finnish name Lepäsi comes from the Russian name, and was used by the Ingrian Finns.

The area was conquered by Peter the Great in the early 18th century and was given by the Tsar to Boris Sheremetev. The Sheremetev family built a manor house here in the 18th century. After the Sheremetevs, the estate was known as Lebyazhye. In 1864, the railway was open, and in the 1860s, Lebyazhye started to specialize as a settlement for maritime pilots who brought the ships to Saint Petersburg. In the beginning of the 20th century, Lebyazhye was a popular summer holiday destination. Among notable people who owned houses there were Mikhail Saltykov-Shchedrin, an author, Valentin Bianki, a biologist, and Vitaly Bianki, his son and a future author.

Krasnaya Gorka fort was constructed at the beginning of the 20th century on the coast near the settlement. The fort played a key part in the Siege of Leningrad as the center of the Oranienbaum Bridgehead during World War II.

In the beginning of the 20th century, Lebyazhye was a part of Petergofsky Uyezds of Saint Petersburg Governorate, with the center in Petergof. The governorate was renamed Petrograd in 1914 and Leningrad in 1924. On February 14, 1923 Petergofsky Uyezd was merged with Detskoselsky Uyezd to form Gatchinsky Uyezd, with the administrative center located in Gatchina. On February 14, 1923 Gatchina was renamed Trotsk, and Gatchinsky Uyezd was renamed Trotsky Uyezd, after Leon Trotsky.

On August 1, 1927, the uyezds were abolished and Oranienbaumsky District, with the administrative center in the town of Oranienbaum, was established. The governorates were also abolished, and the district was a part of Leningrad Okrug of Leningrad Oblast. On July 23, 1930, the okrugs were abolished as well, and the districts were directly subordinated to the oblast. Between August 1941 and January 1944, during World War II, Lebyazhye was a part of the Oranienbaum Bridgehead, which was protecting the city of Saint Petersburg. On February 23, 1948 the town of Oranienbaum was renamed Lomonosov to commemorate Mikhail Lomonosov, and the district was renamed Lomonosovsky. On November 22, 1966 Lebyazhye was granted urban-type settlement status.

== Restricted access ==
Lebyazhye along with the adjacent parts of Lomonosovsky District is included into the border security zone, intended to protect the borders of Russia from unwanted activity. In order to visit the zone, a permit issued by the local Federal Security Service department is required.

== Economy ==
In Lebyazhye, there is a large-scale poultry farm, as well as a number military installations.

=== Transportation ===
Lebyazhye has a railway stations on the railway connecting the Baltiysky railway station of Saint Petersburg with Veymarn. The Lebyazhye railway station serves as a terminus for some suburban trains.

Lebyazhye is located on the A121 highway (Krasnoflotskoye Highway) which follows the southern shore of the Gulf of Finland and connects Saint Petersburg and Sosnovy Bor. There are bus connections to Saint Petersburg.

== Culture and recreation ==
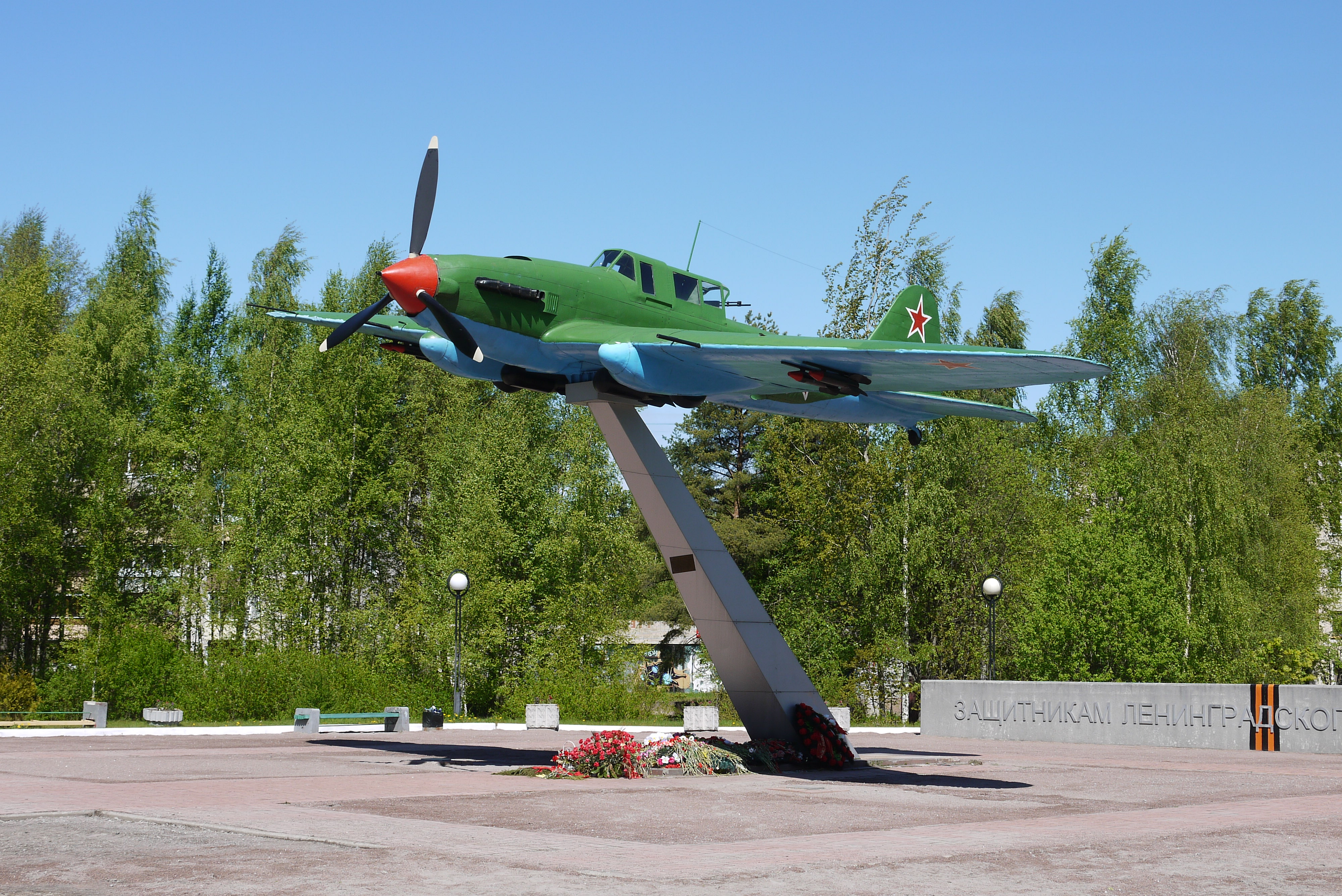
Ilyushin Il-2 in Lebyazhye

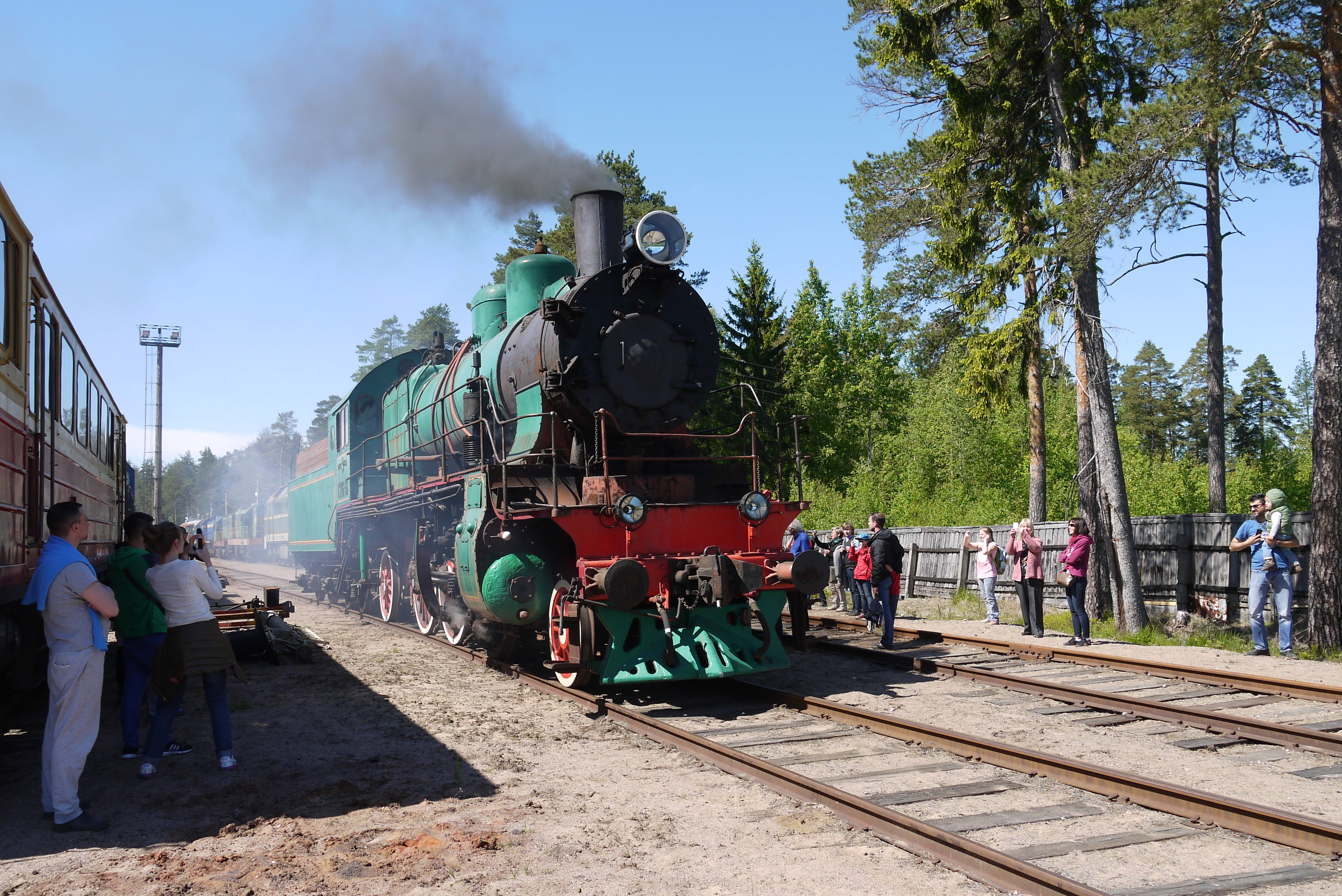
Su 206-56 in steam in the Lebyazhye Railway Museum

Lebyazhye contains thirteen objects classified as cultural and historical heritage of local significance. All of them commemorate events of the Russian Civil War and World War II. These include a plinthed BMP-1 and Ilyushin Il-2 World War II aircraft.

Lebyazhye Railway Museum is located in the forest to the south of the Lebyazhye Railway Station. Amongst a number of interesting exhibits the museum is home to the very first Russian locomotive class LV namely OR18-01, Russian locomotive class P36-249 and the operable steam locomotive Su-206-56.
