= Bolshaya Izhora =

Bolshaya Izhora Большая Ижора Haisevaisi
- Urban-type settlement
- Interactive map of Bolshaya Izhora
- Location of Bolshaya Izhora Bolshaya Izhora (Leningrad Oblast)
- Coordinates: 59°56′40″N 29°34′30″E
- Country: Russia
- Federal subject: Leningrad Oblast
- Administrative district: Lomonosovsky District
- Urban-type settlement status since: August 27, 1939
- Elevation: 8 m (26 ft)

Population (2010 Census)
  - Total: 3,314
  - Estimate (2024): 2,524 (−23.8%)

Municipal status
  - Municipal district: Lomonosovsky Municipal District
  - Urban settlement: Bolsheizhorskoye Urban Settlement
  - Capital of: Bolsheizhorskoye Urban Settlement
- Time zone: UTC+3 (MSK)
- Postal code: 188531
- OKTMO ID: 41630154051

Bolshaya Izhora (Russian: Больша́я Ижо́ра, Finnish: Haisevaisi) is an urban locality (an urban-type settlement) in Lomonosovsky District of Leningrad Oblast, Russia, located on the southern shore of the Gulf of Finland. It is adjacent from the west to Saint Petersburg. Population: 3,314 (2010 census); 3,831 (2002 census); 3,967 (1989 Soviet census).

== History ==
Bolshaya Izhora was established as a merger of several settlements: the selo of Bolshaya Izhora, the village of Sagomilye, and two suburban settlements, Primorsky Khutor and Pilnaya. The oldest of them (Pilnaya) was known since the 17th century, when a mill and a sawmill were in operation. In 1774, the Pilnaya Estate was built by Anastasiya Bibikova, the widow of general Alexander Ilyich Bibikov. Eventually, her son, Aleksandr Aleksandrovich Bibikov, also a military officer, inherited the estate. The lands around Bolshaya Izhora originally belonged to Alexander Menshikov, and in the 19th century for some time to Grand Duke Michael, a brother of Tsar Nicholas I. The area remained largely unpopulated until the railway was opened in 1864. In the beginning of the 20th century, Bolshaya Izhora was a popular summer holiday destination. Until 1918, it had boat connections with Kronstadt every summer.

In the beginning of the 20th century, Bolshaya Izhora was a part of Petergofsky Uyezds of Saint Petersburg Governorate, with the center in Petergof. The governorate was renamed Petrograd in 1914 and Leningrad in 1924. On February 14, 1923 Petergofsky Uyezd was merged with Detskoselsky Uyezd to form Gatchinsky Uyezd, with the administrative center located in Gatchina. On February 14, 1923 Gatchina was renamed Trotsk, and Gatchinsky Uyezd was renamed Trotsky Uyezd, after Leon Trotsky.

On August 1, 1927, the uyezds were abolished and Oranienbaumsky District, with the administrative center in the town of Oranienbaum, was established. The governorates were also abolished, and the district was a part of Leningrad Okrug of Leningrad Oblast. Bolshaya Izhora was a part of the district. On July 23, 1930, the okrugs were abolished as well, and the districts were directly subordinated to the oblast. On August 27, 1939 Bolshaya Izhora was made an urban-type settlement. Between August 1941 and January 1944 the eastern part of the district, including Bolshaya Izhora, served as a territory, known as Oranienbaum Bridgehead, which protected the city of Leningrad form German troops. On February 23, 1948 the town of Oranienbaum was renamed Lomonosov to commemorate Mikhail Lomonosov, and the district was renamed Lomonosovsky.

== Economy ==
During the Soviet period, before 1991, the economy of Bolshaya Izhora was based on military installations, which were since made a joint-stock company (ex 15th Arsenal of the Navy - (Military Unit Number (в/ч) 69233, с 2010 в/ч 81263) and still employs a fraction of population of the settlement. Bolshaya Izhora was an area of limited access. As of 2013, 81% of all lands in Bolshaya Izhora still belonged to the Defence Ministry, Bolshaya Izhora had no industrial enterprises, and its population were daily commuting to Saint Petersburg for work. Hopes were raised that some day it could rely on tourism, but as of 2013 there were no specific plans of the tourist infrastructure developments.

=== Transportation ===
Bolshaya Izhora has two railway stations on the railway connecting the Baltiysky railway station of Saint Petersburg with Veymarn, Bolshaya Izhora and Dubochki.

Bolshaya Izhora is located on the A121 highway (Krasnoflotskoye Highway) which follows the southern shore of the Gulf of Finland and connects Saint Petersburg and Sosnovy Bor. It is also the northwestern terminus of the A120 highway which encircles Saint Petersburg from the south. There are frequent bus connections to Saint Petersburg.

== Culture and recreation ==
The district contains two objects classified as cultural and historical heritage of local significance. Both are graves of soldiers fallen in World War II.
