= Russian Railway Museum =

Museum in Saint Petersburg, Russia

- Музей железных дорог России
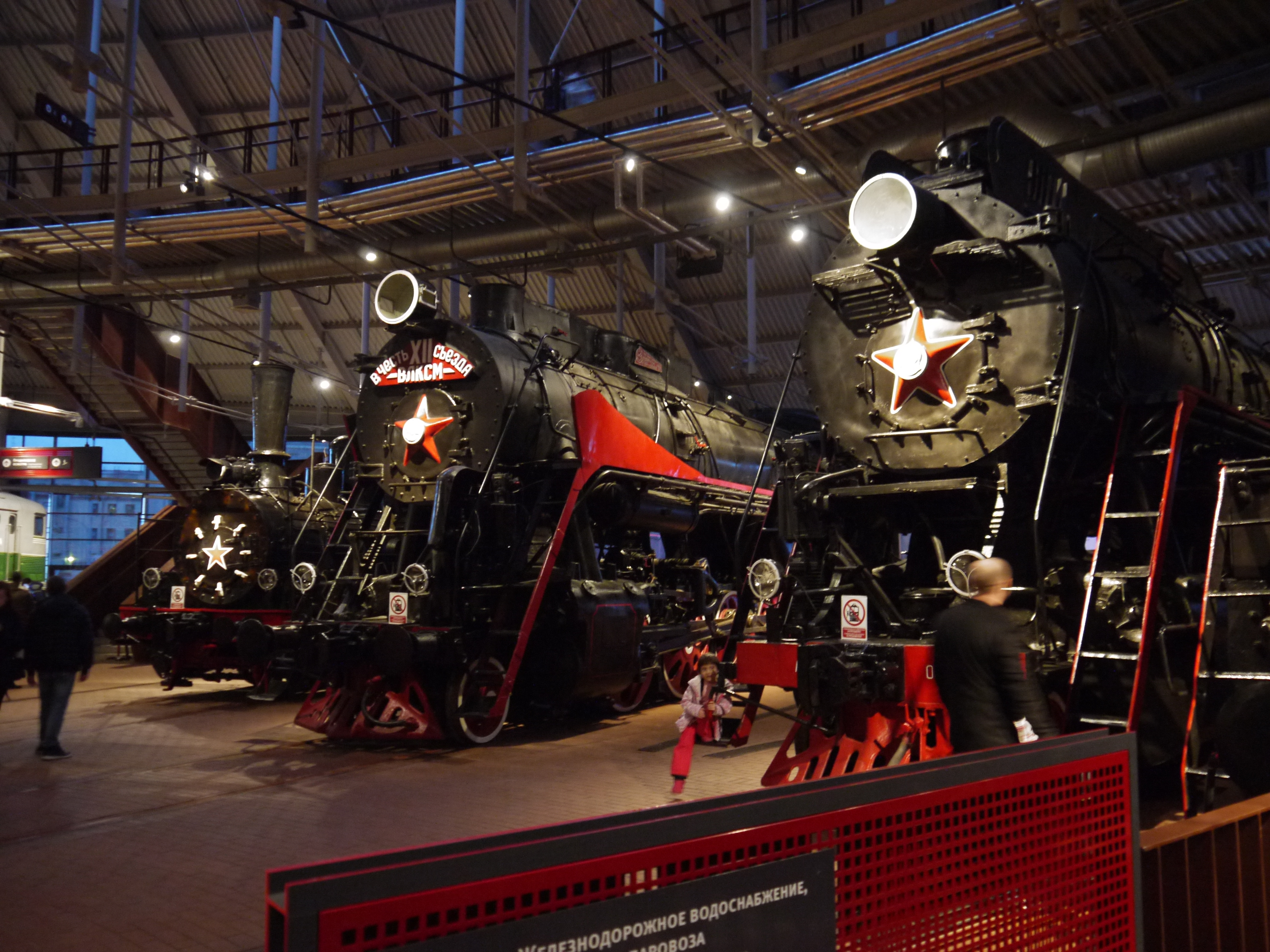
- Ov6640, L2298 and LV18-002 at the Russian Railway Museum
- Location: Saint Petersburg
- Coordinates: 59.905750°N 30.297753°E
- Public transit access: Baltiyskaya (Saint Petersburg Metro)
- Website: rzd-museum.ru/en

The Russian Railway Museum is situated next to Baltiysky railway station in Saint Petersburg. The museum was established in 1978, its current site and exhibition opened to public on 1 November 2017. The museum utilizes the nineteenth century locomotive shed of the Peterhof Railway built in 1857–1858, however a large second exhibition building and open exhibition areas have been added.

This Russian Railway Museum maintained by the Russian Railways is not to be confused with the Central Rail Transport Museum owned by the Federal Agency for the Rail Transport and located on Sadovaya str.

== History ==
In 1974, the trade union and the management of the Oktyabrskaya Railway decided to establish a museum for the employees of the enterprise. The first exhibition opened in 1978 and was located in the centre of Leningrad, on Liteyny Avenue. Later a small group of enthusiastic railway workers proposed to preserve the historical rolling stock pieces. Their proposal was met by the railway management that provided a site in the southern outskirts of the city to store and repair locomotives and carriages. The museum in Shushary opened for public in 1991, and the nearby commuter rail station "16-th kilometer" used by visitors to reach the museum was renamed to "Parovozny Muzey" ("Museum of Steamers"). The museum occupied 7500 square meters and possessed 40 exhibits including 18 locomotives of different kinds.

In May 2001, Varshavsky railway station in St. Petersburg was closed for the scheduled passenger services and the most valuable part of the museum's collection in Shushary was placed along its platforms. In August 2001, the new site of the museum was opened for public. On 20 thousand square meters, about 80 items of historical rolling stock were put on display. Once the collection was relocated to the central part of the city, the number of visitors has sixfolded, and the museum became one of the popular places of interest of its kind. Visitors could also make a rail journey on a train pulled by a retro steamer. However, as the Varshavsky station building was provided exclusively for the commercial use, the museum had no indoor exhibition. Besides, the tracks of the former station were to be removed to free up the space for the planned residential construction. Thus in 2007-2012, the project of the new site was drawn and by late 2017 its construction was accomplished.

On 30 October 2017, the renewed site of the Russian Railway Museum was opened in the reconstructed building of the former locomotive depot of the Baltiysky railway station. It consists of indoor and outdoor exhibitions storing around 35000 historical artifacts including 118 items of rolling stock. Being one of the biggest railway museums in Europe, in 2019 the museum became a nominee for the European Museum of the Year Award by the European Museum Forum.

== Overview ==
Most of the exhibits were previously displayed in the October Railway Museum at the former Varshavsky railway station. However, more exhibits have been added to the collection and much of the museum collection is under the roof. The whole story of railways is shown from Richard Trevithick to the present day. Two HO railway models are also present. One model is of Russia’s first passenger railway – the Tsarskoye Selo Railway and the second of Vladivostok Station. The RT-23 Molodets railway missile train and the Obukhovskii 12"/52 Pattern 1907 gun#1938 Railway gun TM-3-12 Railway gun are parked outside at the open exhibition area. One of the unique pieces is the TEP-80 (ТЭП-80) diesel locomotive that set the world record of diesel train speed – 271 km/h – in 1993. The museum features the first diesel locomotive built in Soviet Russia in 1924 by Lenin's decree. Interactive elements such as a simulator of TEP-70 (ТЭП-70) locomotive are available. The museum provides lecturing and educational facilities.

Most of the locomotives and cars may be only watched from the outside, but there are ones that may be boarded. The environment of the museum is designed to be disabled-friendly. Full descriptions of exhibits are provided in both Russian and English. Guided tours are provided at extra charge.

Exhibits at the museum
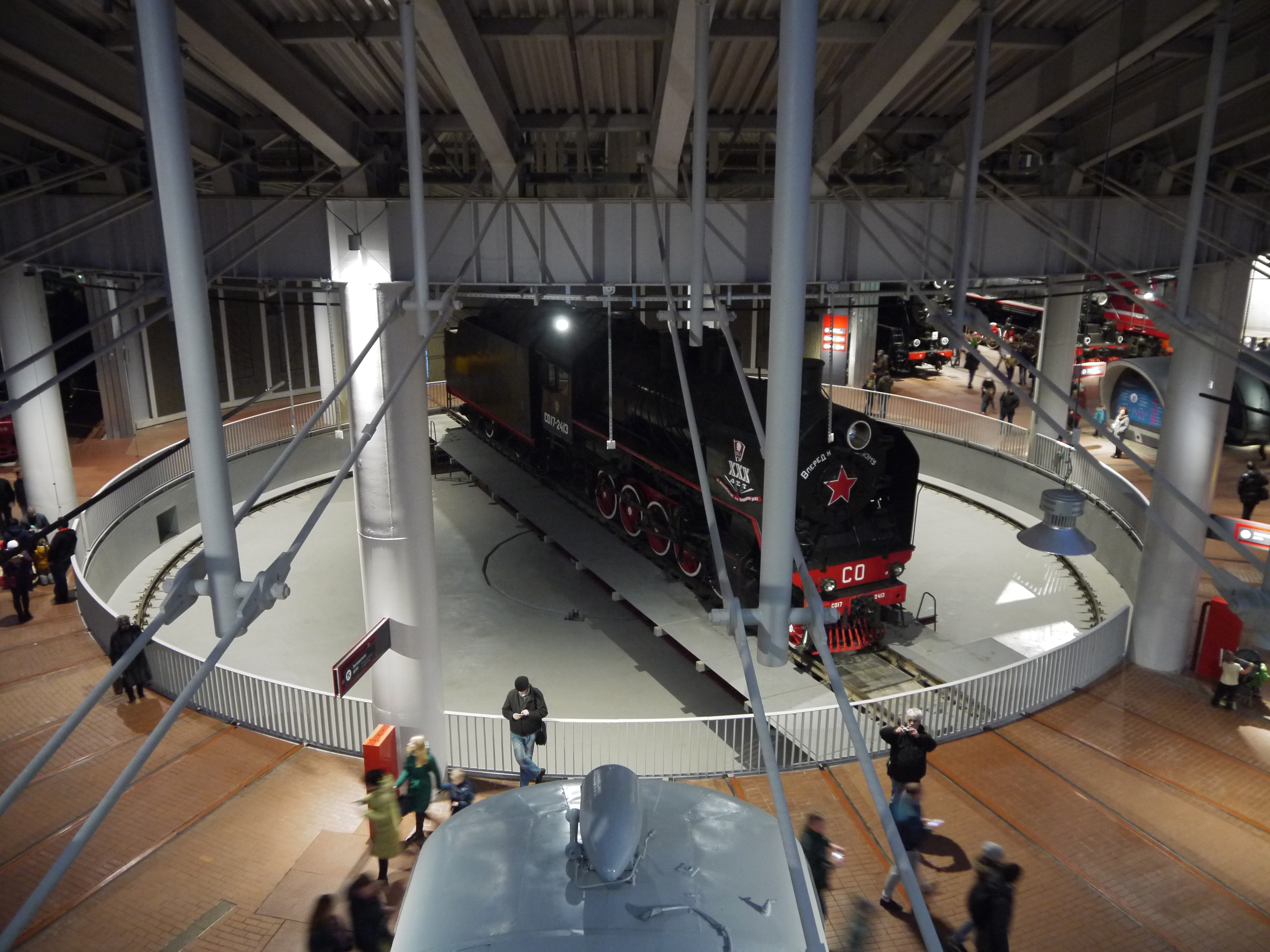
Steam locomotive SO17-2413

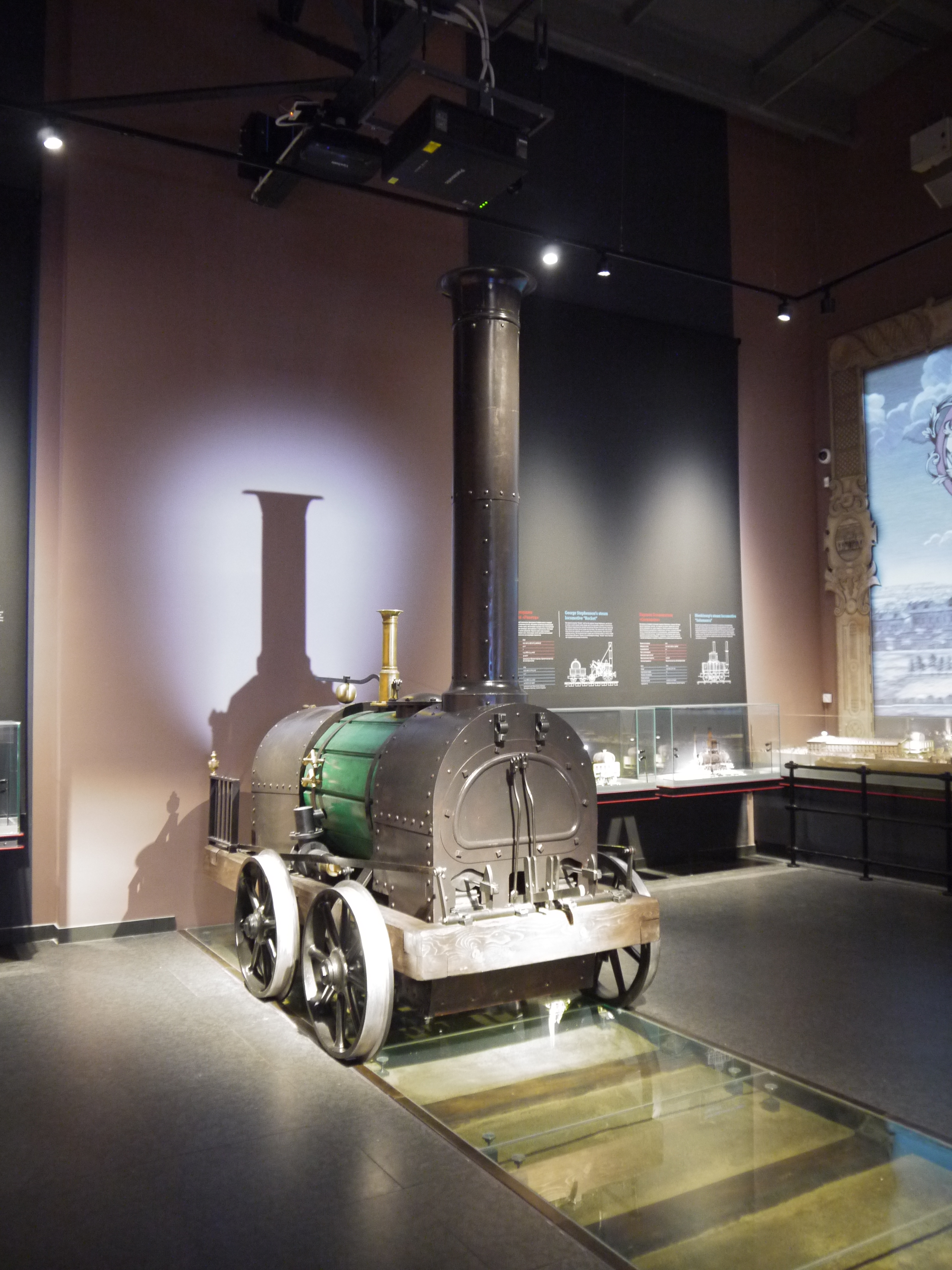
Model of Yefim and Miron Cherepanov's locomotive

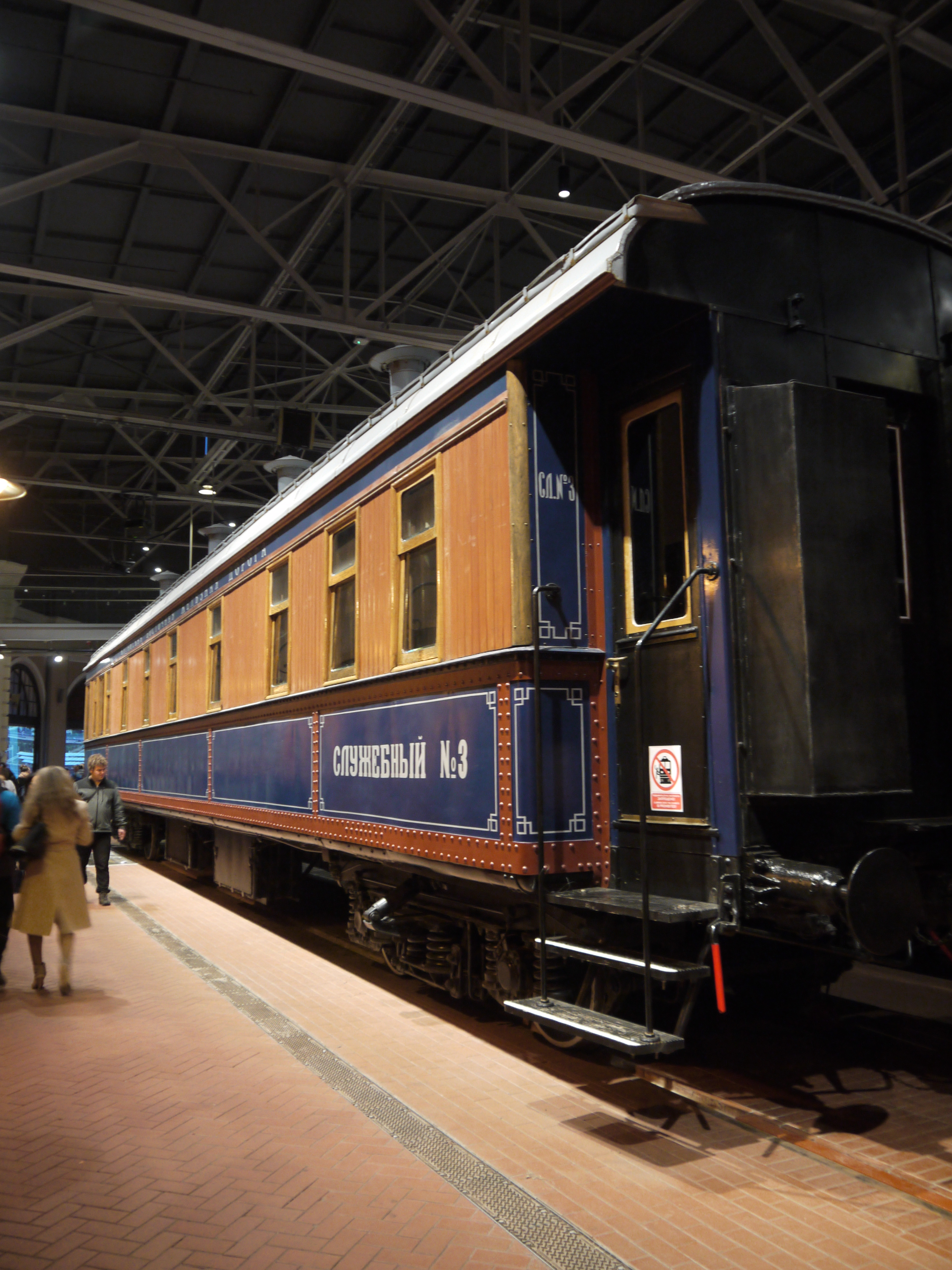
Official Saloon Car of the Chinese Eastern Railway

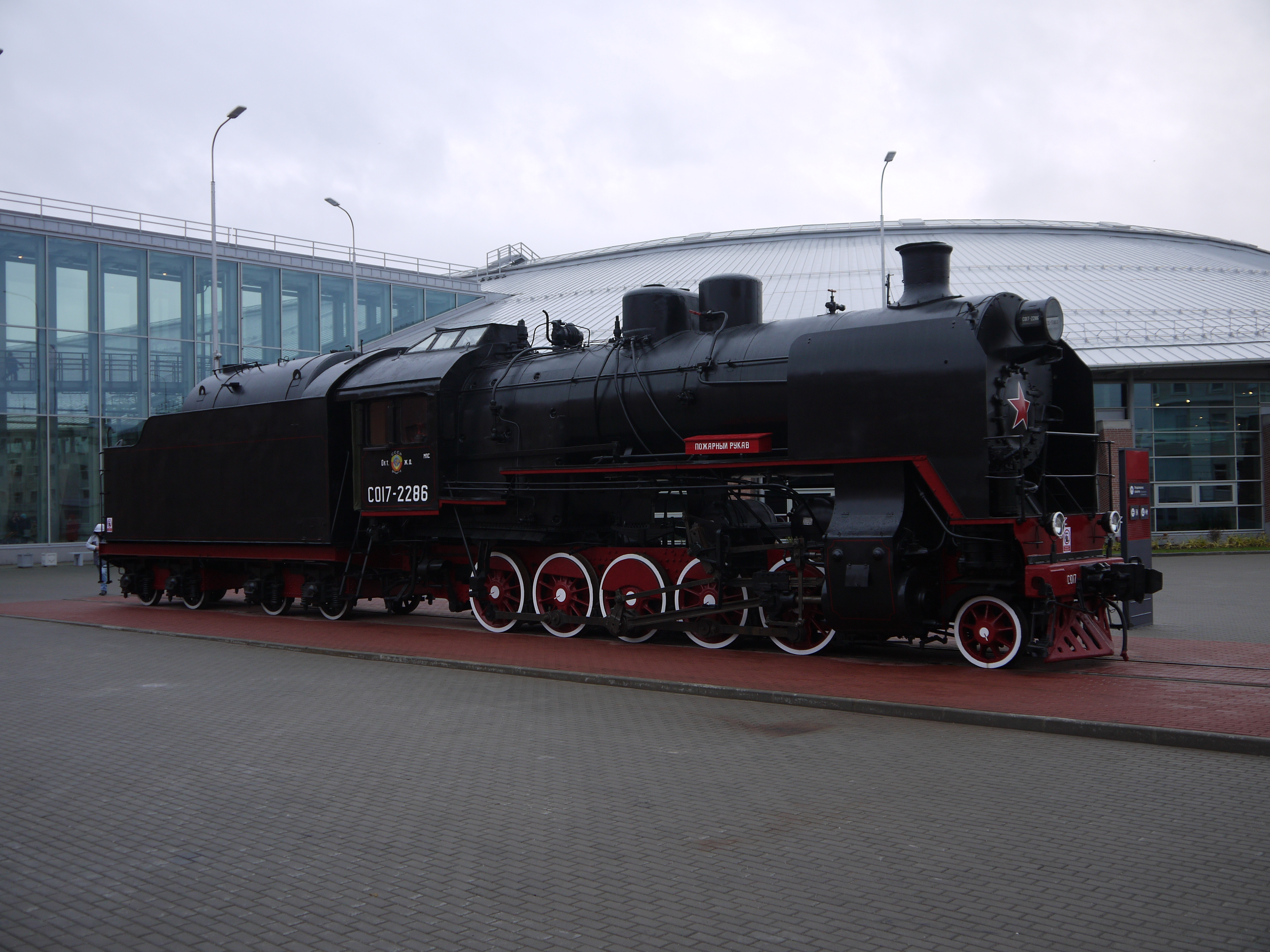
Steam locomotive S017-2286 outside the Museum

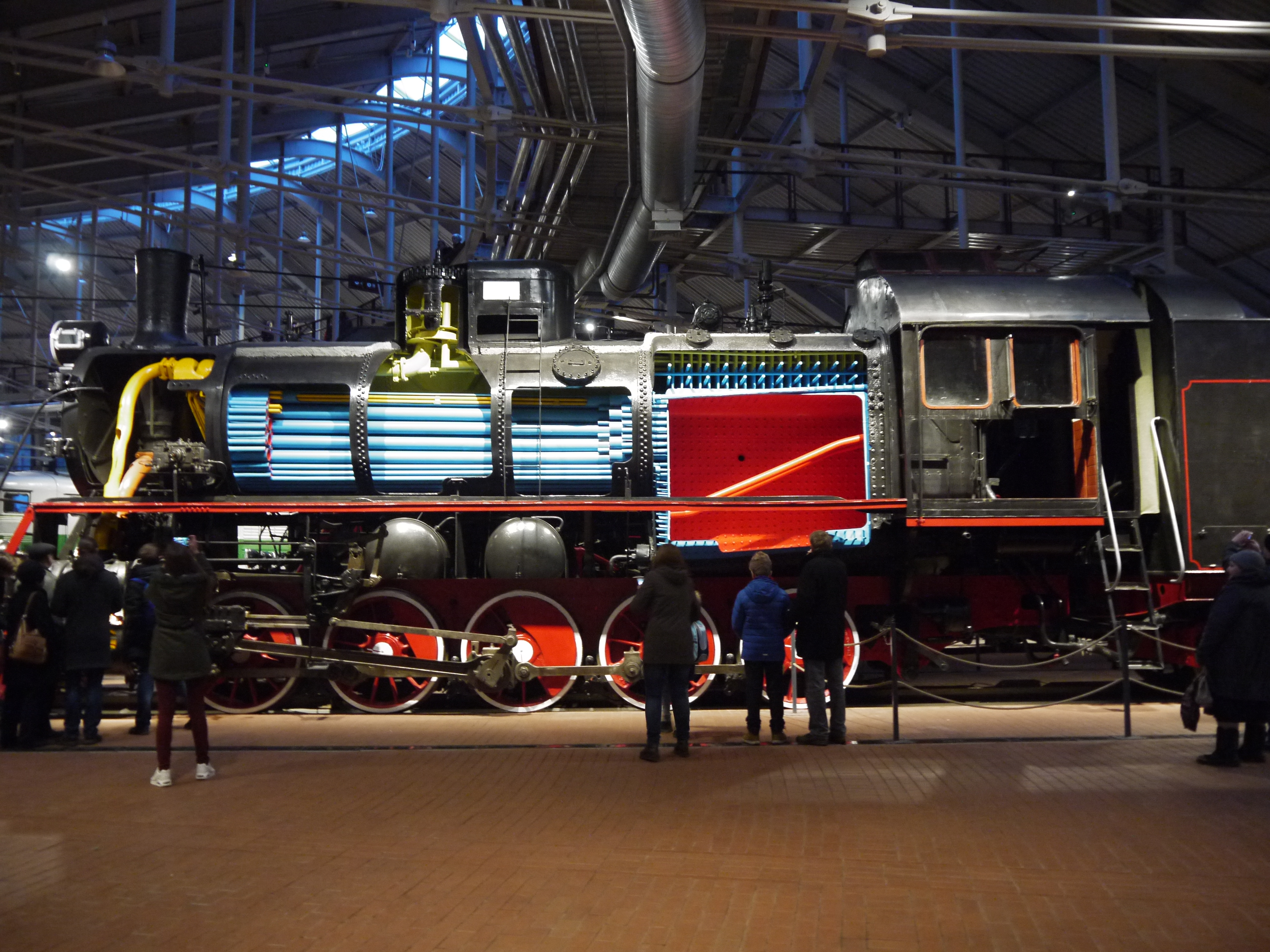
Cutaway Russian locomotive class Er 791-81

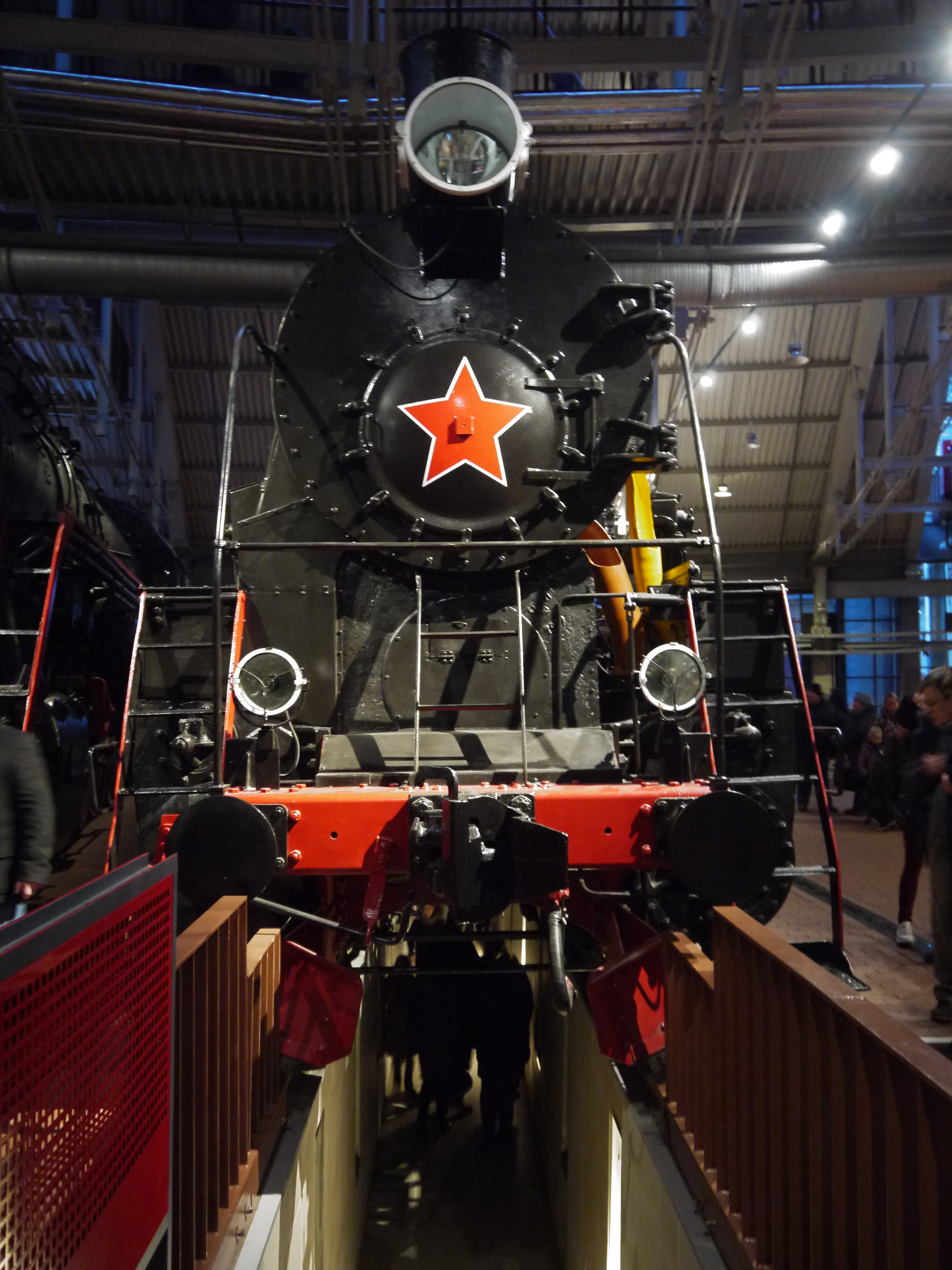
Er 791-81 showing the pit for viewing the underside

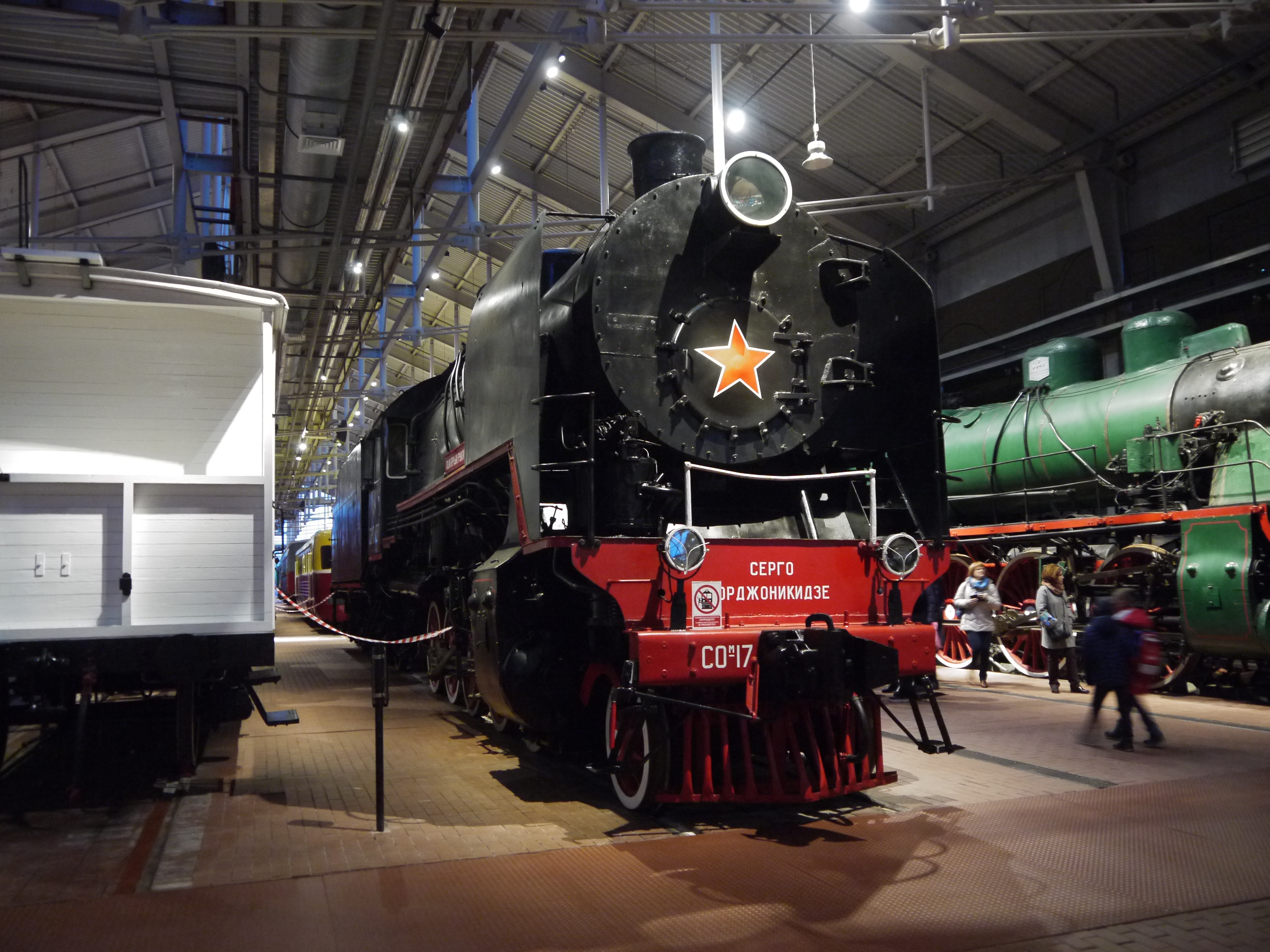
Steam locomotive SOm17-1137

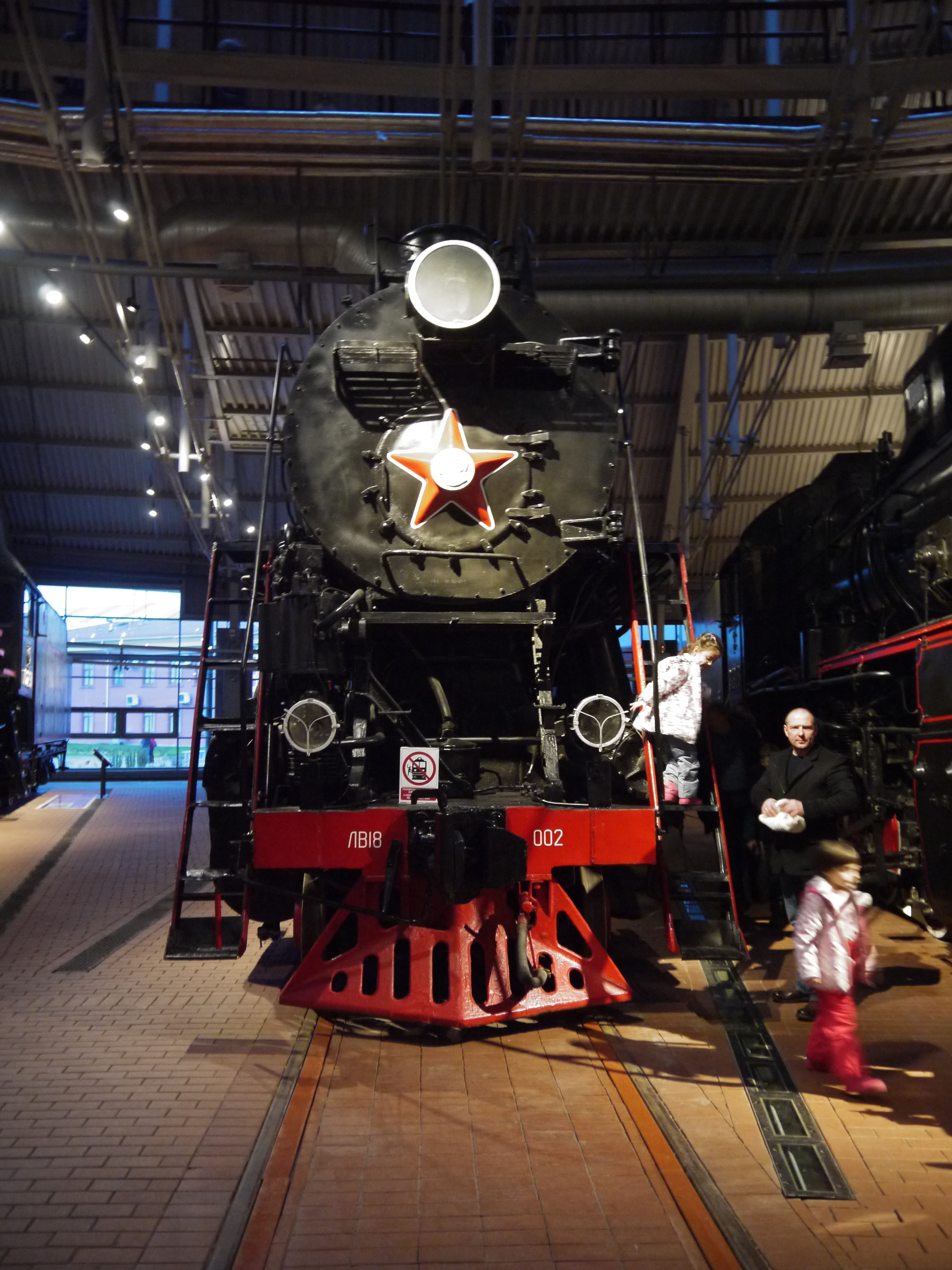
Russian locomotive class LV18-002

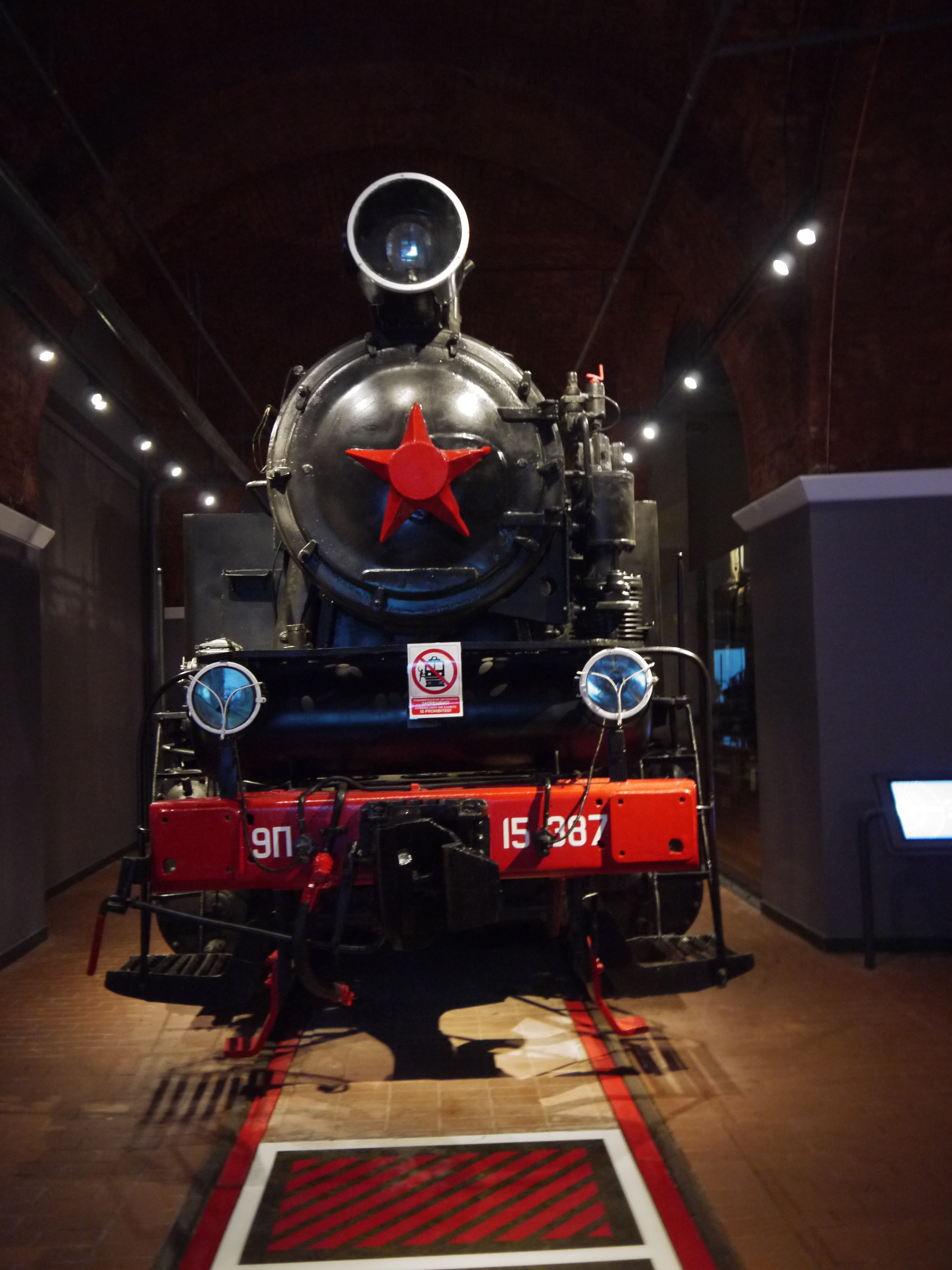
Industrial steam tank locomotive 9P-15387

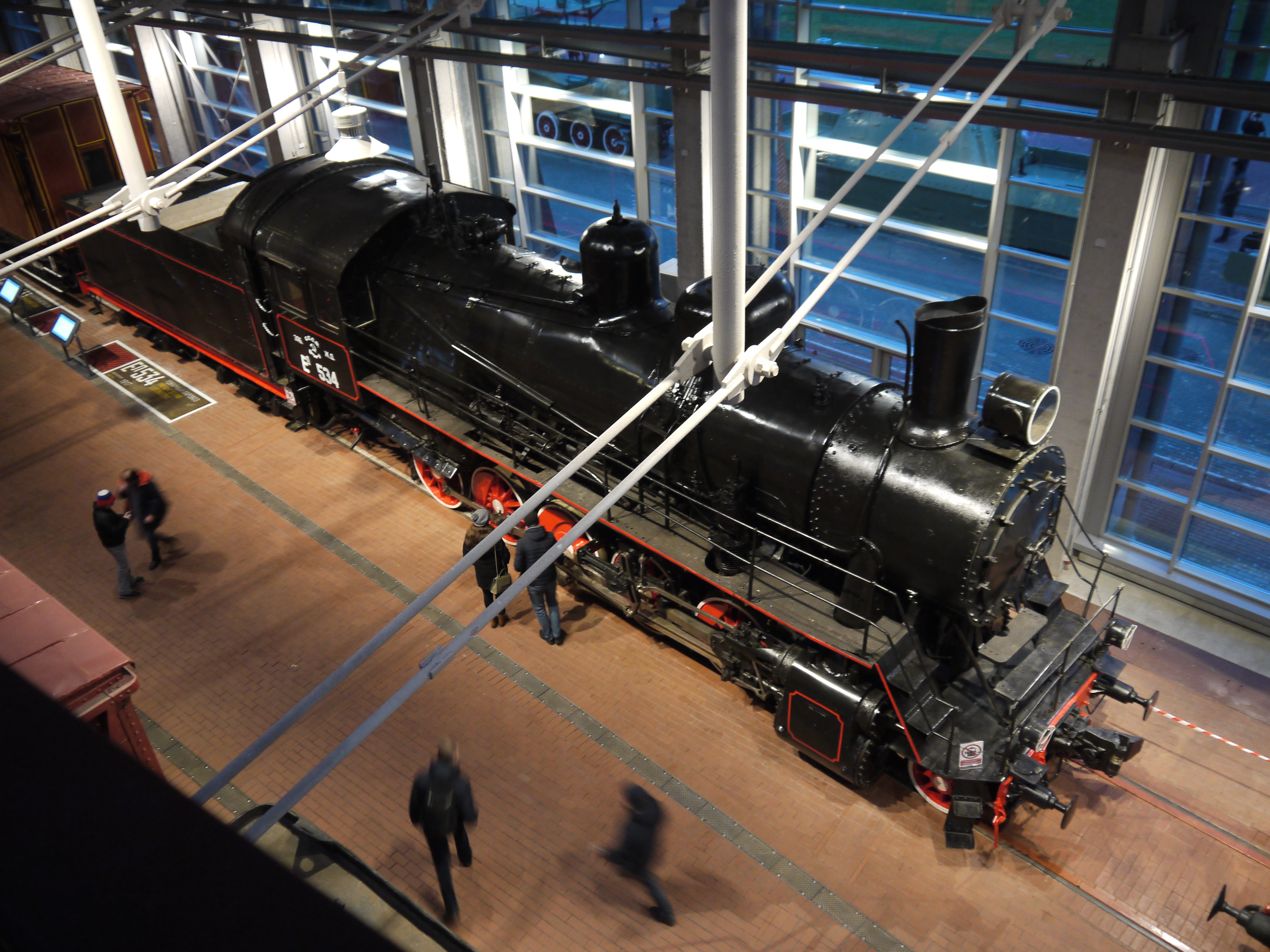
Russian locomotive class Yel 534

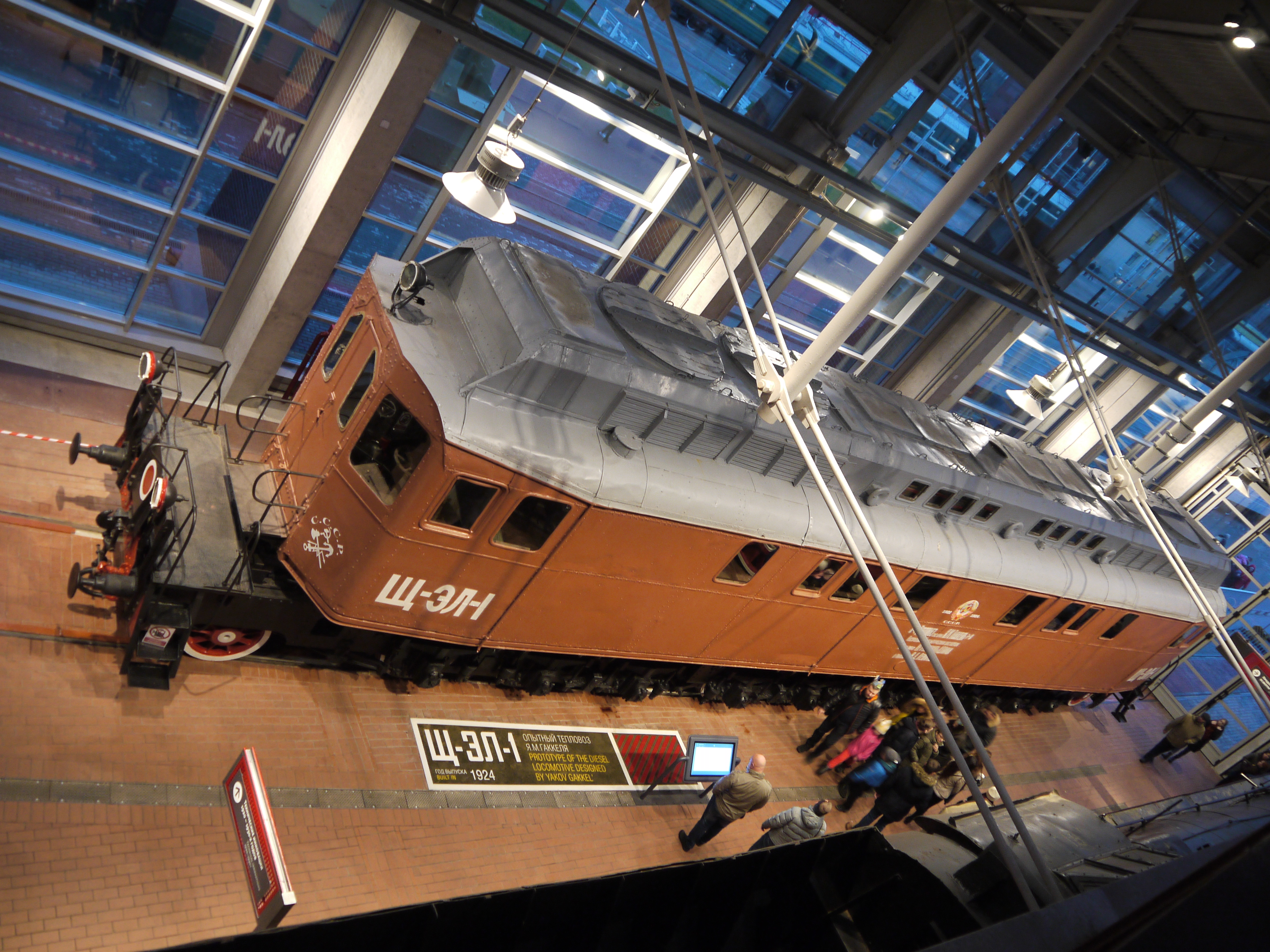
Russian locomotive class shch-el-1

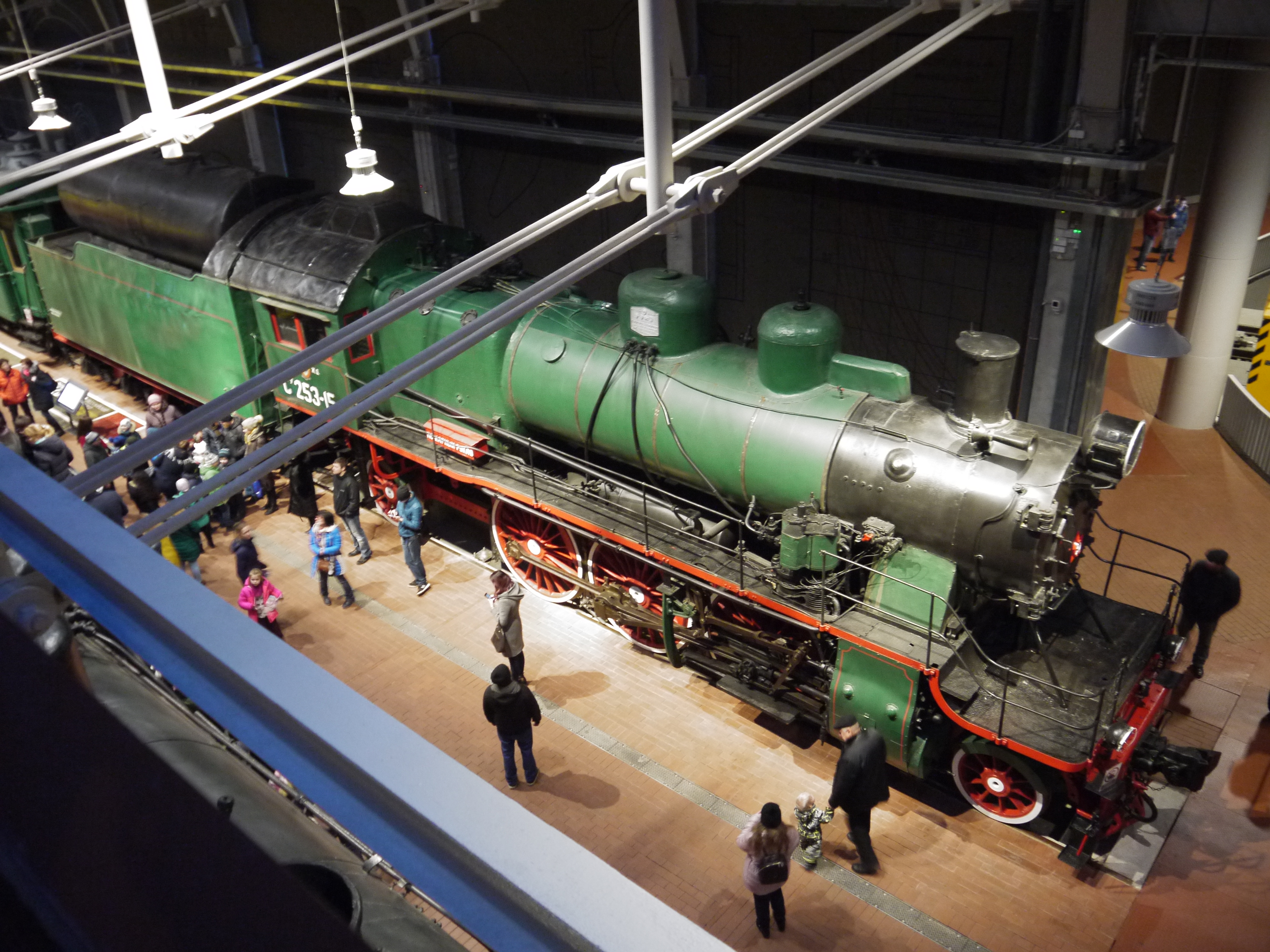
Passenger steam locomotive Su 253-15

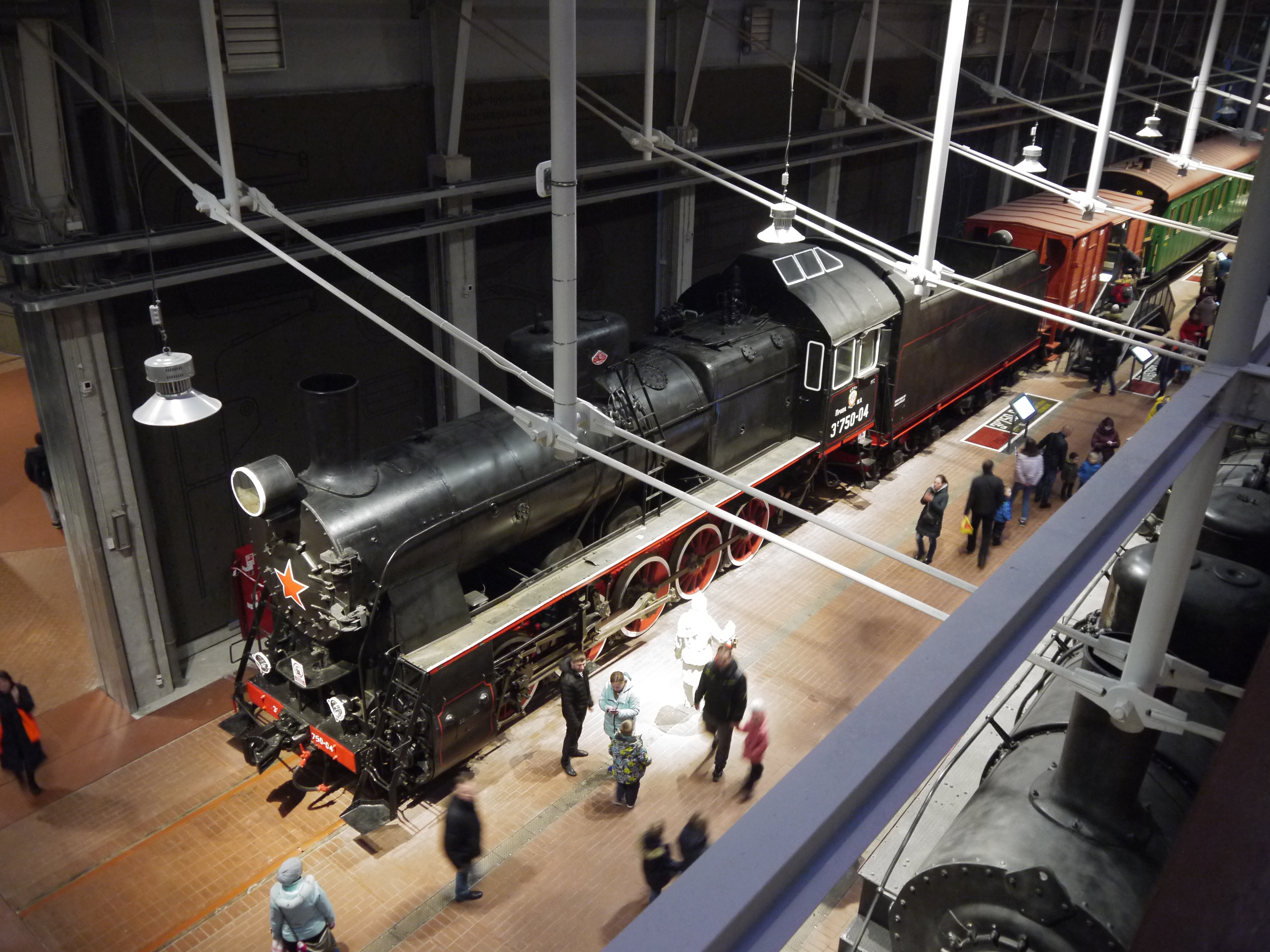
Russian locomotive class Er 750-04

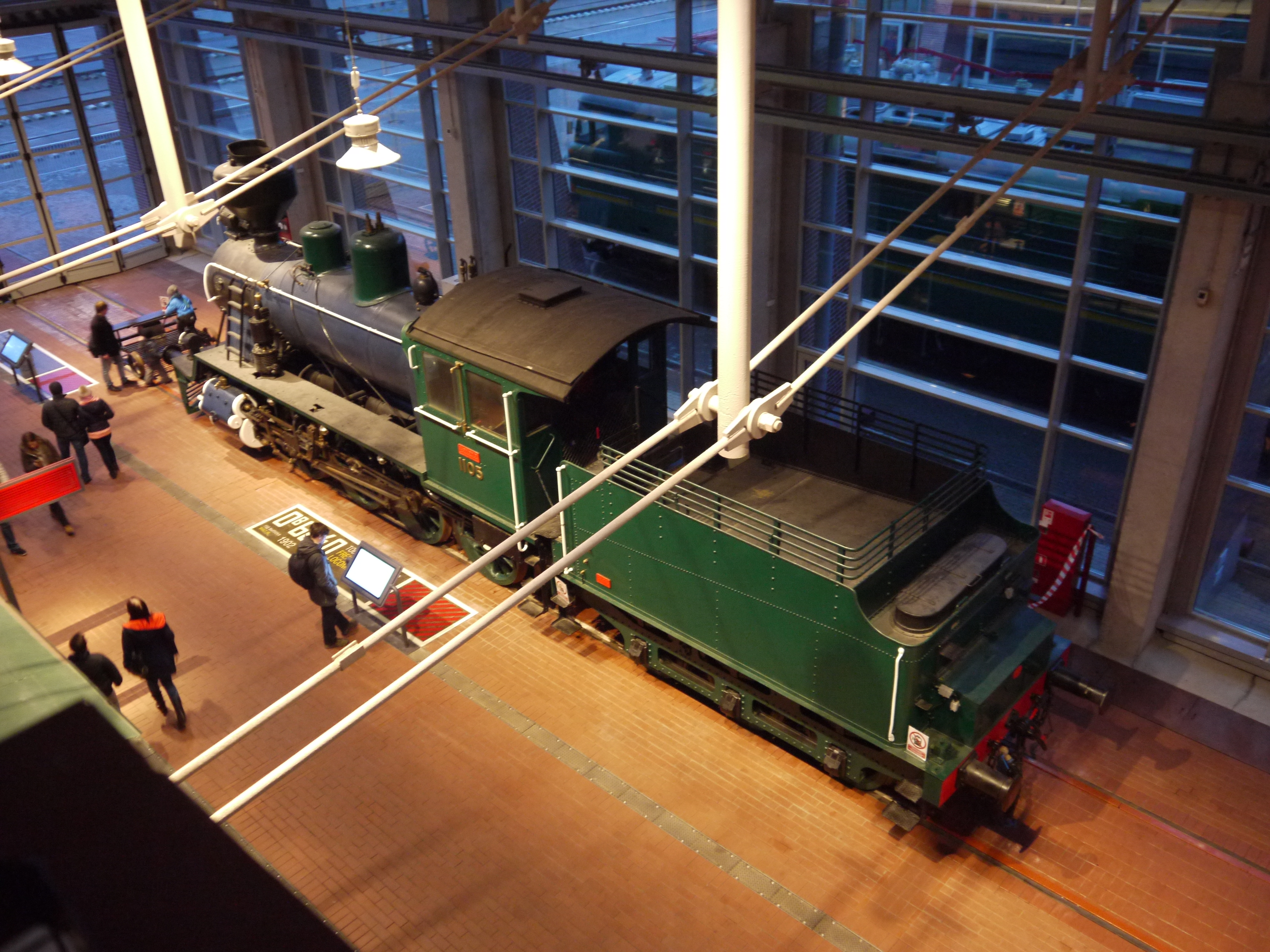
Finnish VR Class Tk3-1105 steam locomotive

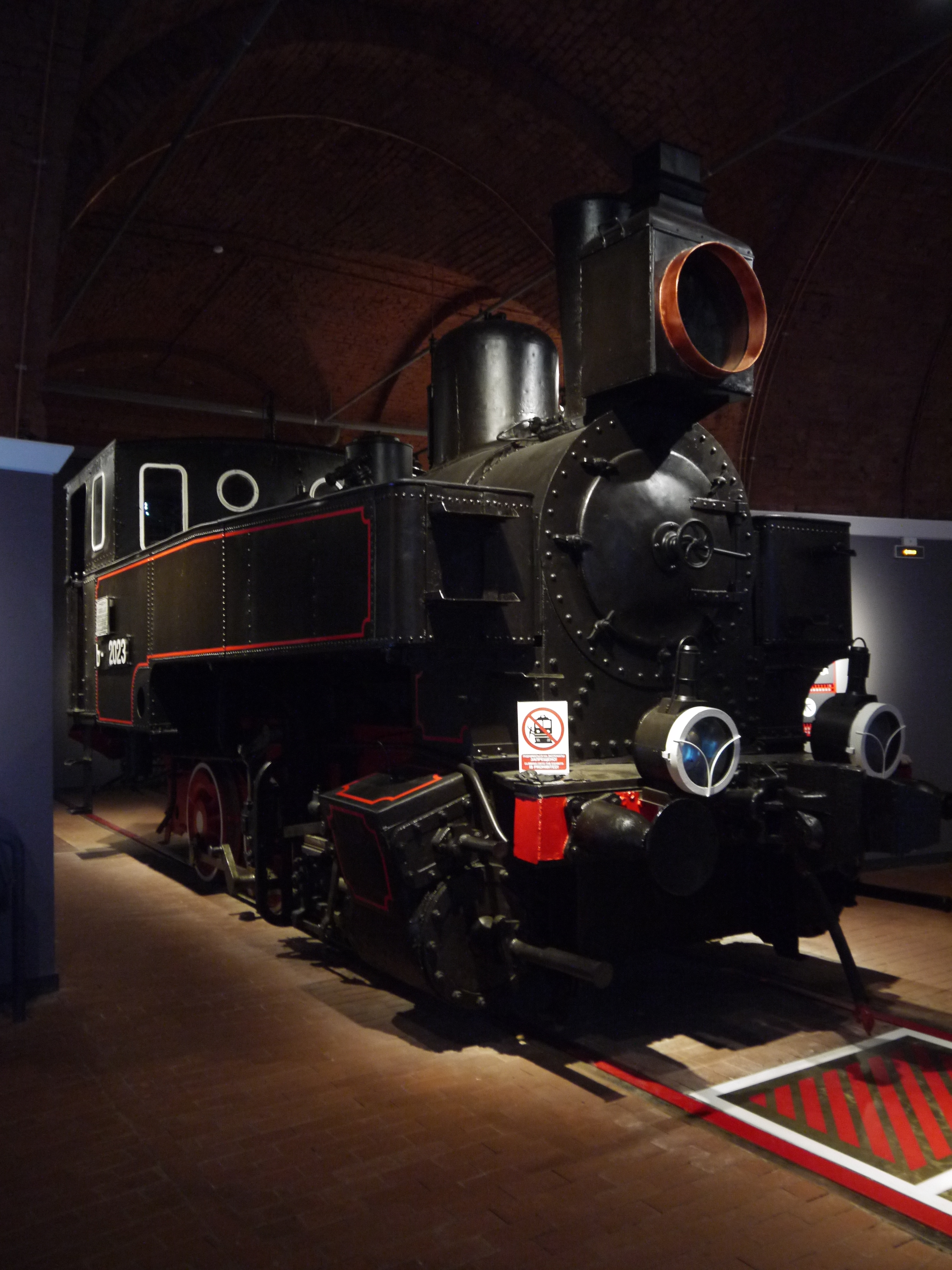
Oil fired Tank steam locomotive b-2023. Built in 1897 by Kolomna Works

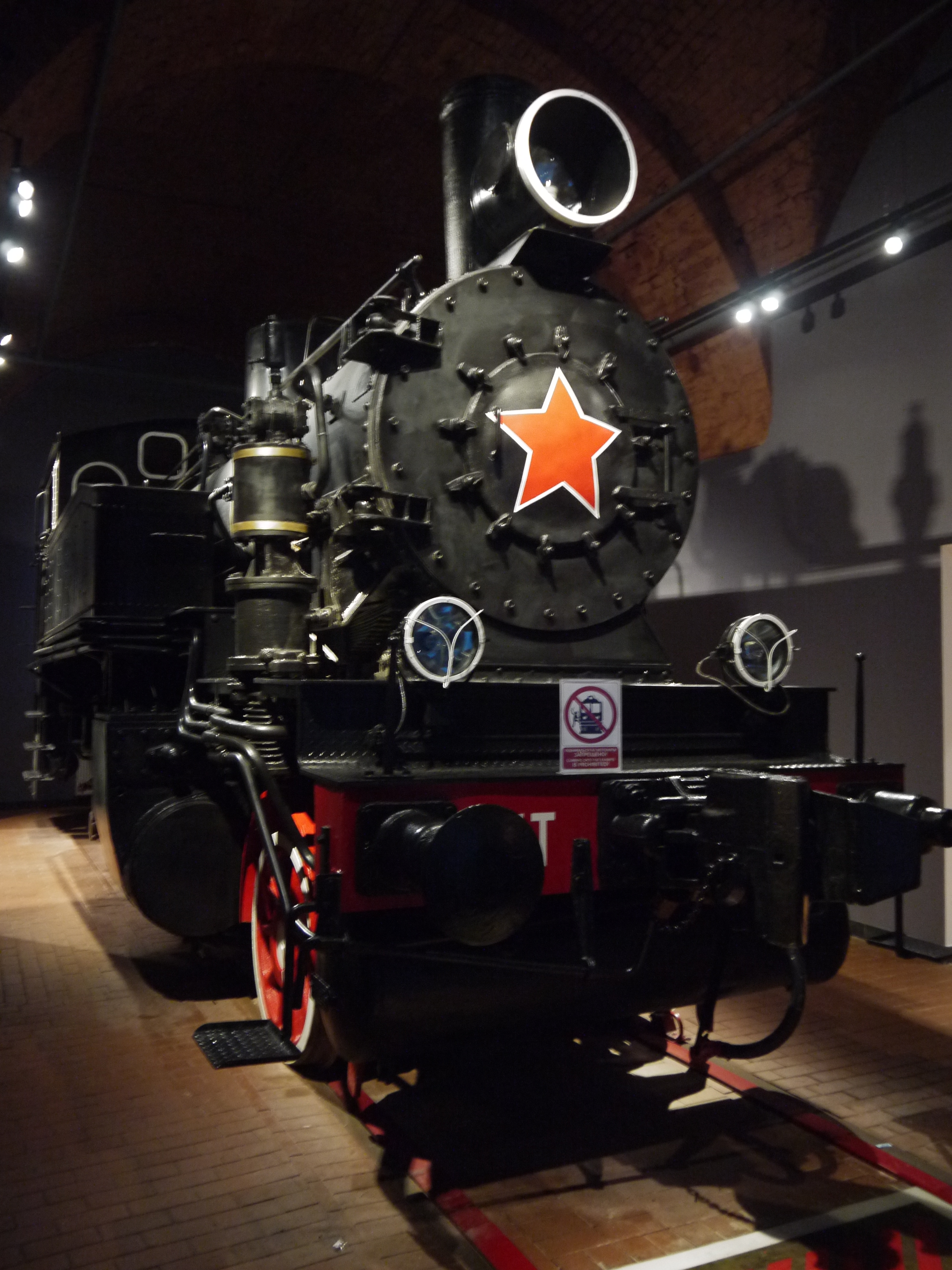
TT-1770 a captured German Trophy. She is a re-gauged Prussian T 9.3

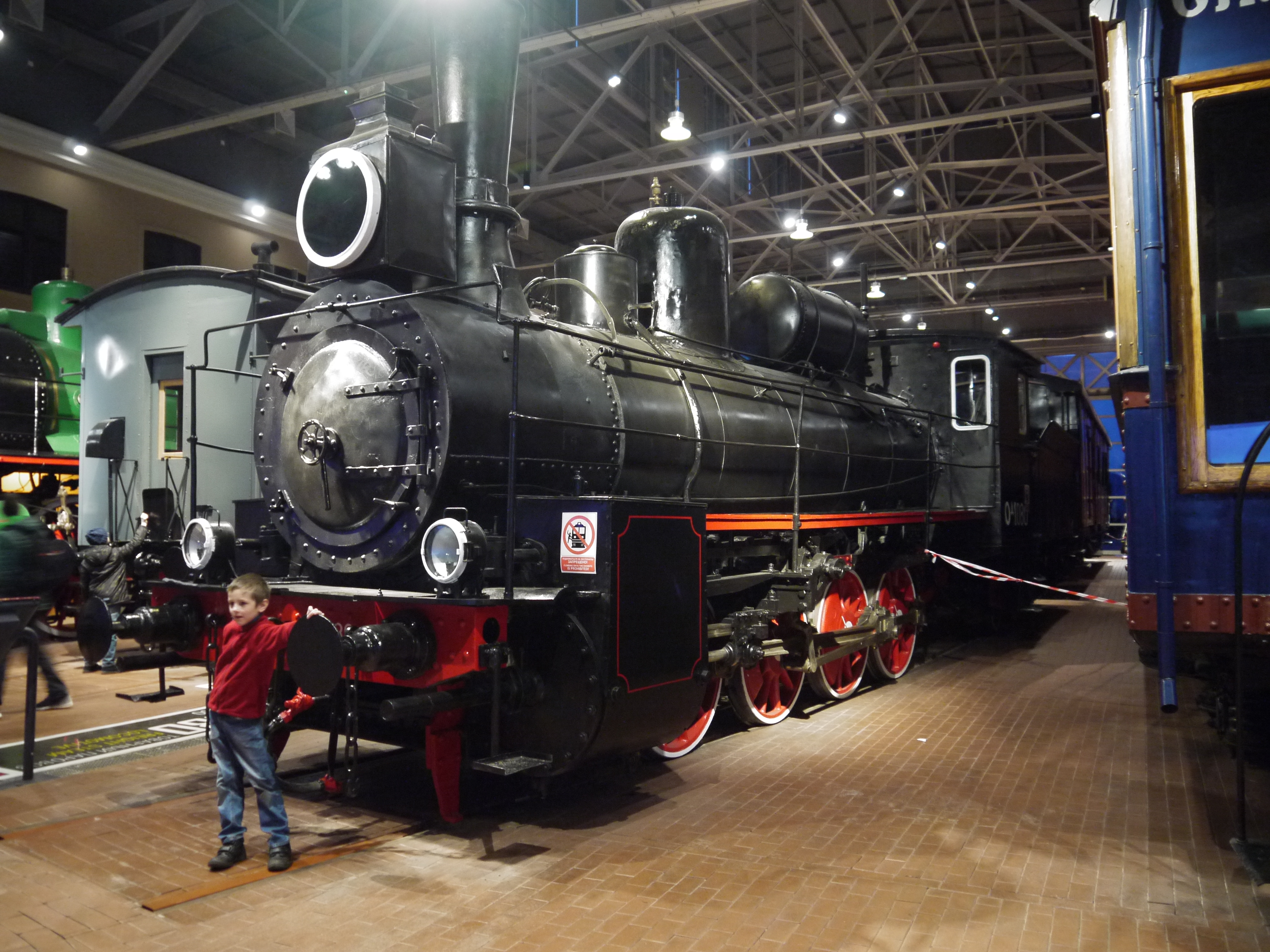
Russian locomotive class Od-1080 a Nineteenth Century Freight locomotive

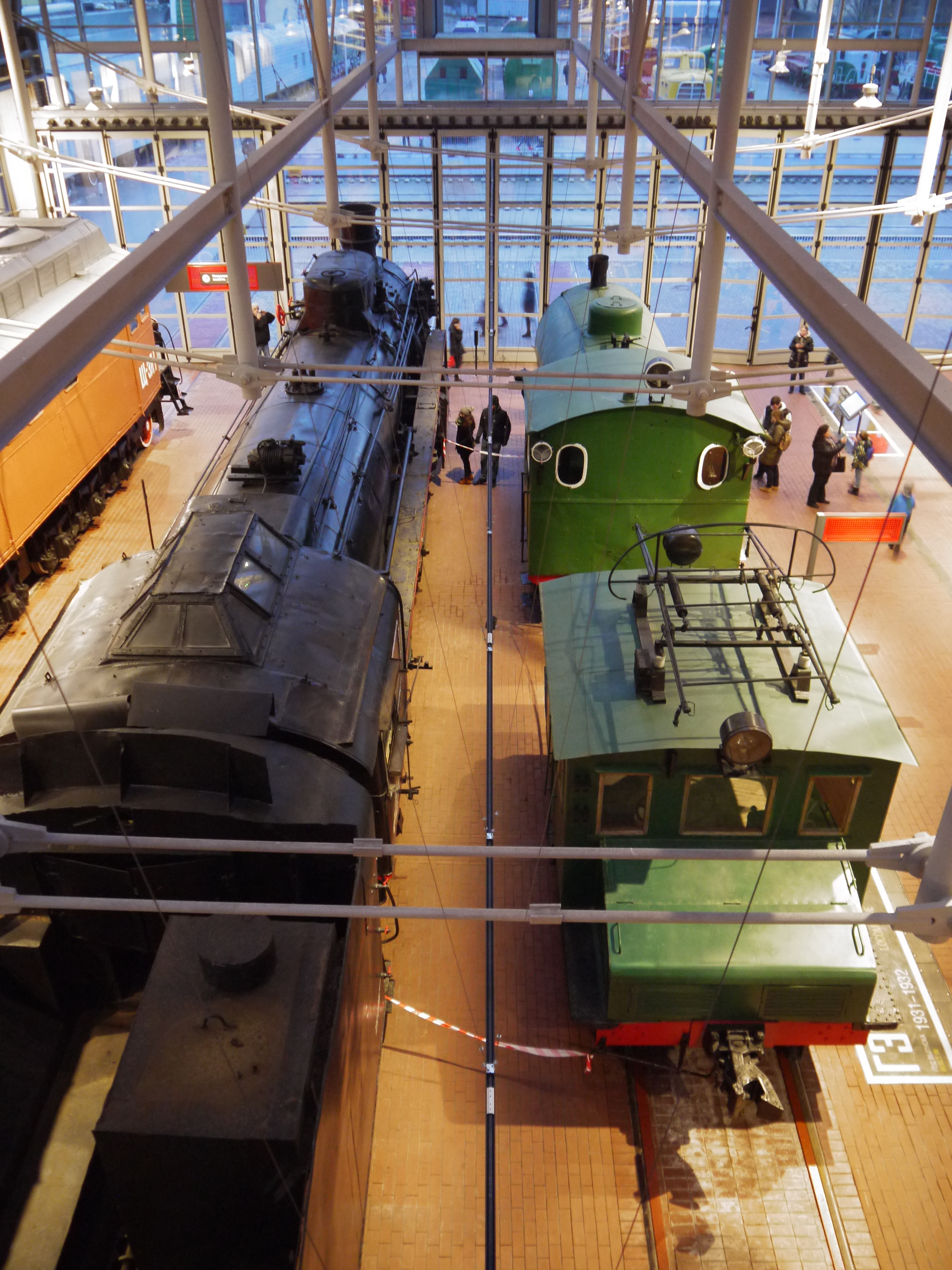
Russian locomotive class FD 1103 steam locomotive and Fireless Locomotive No.9305

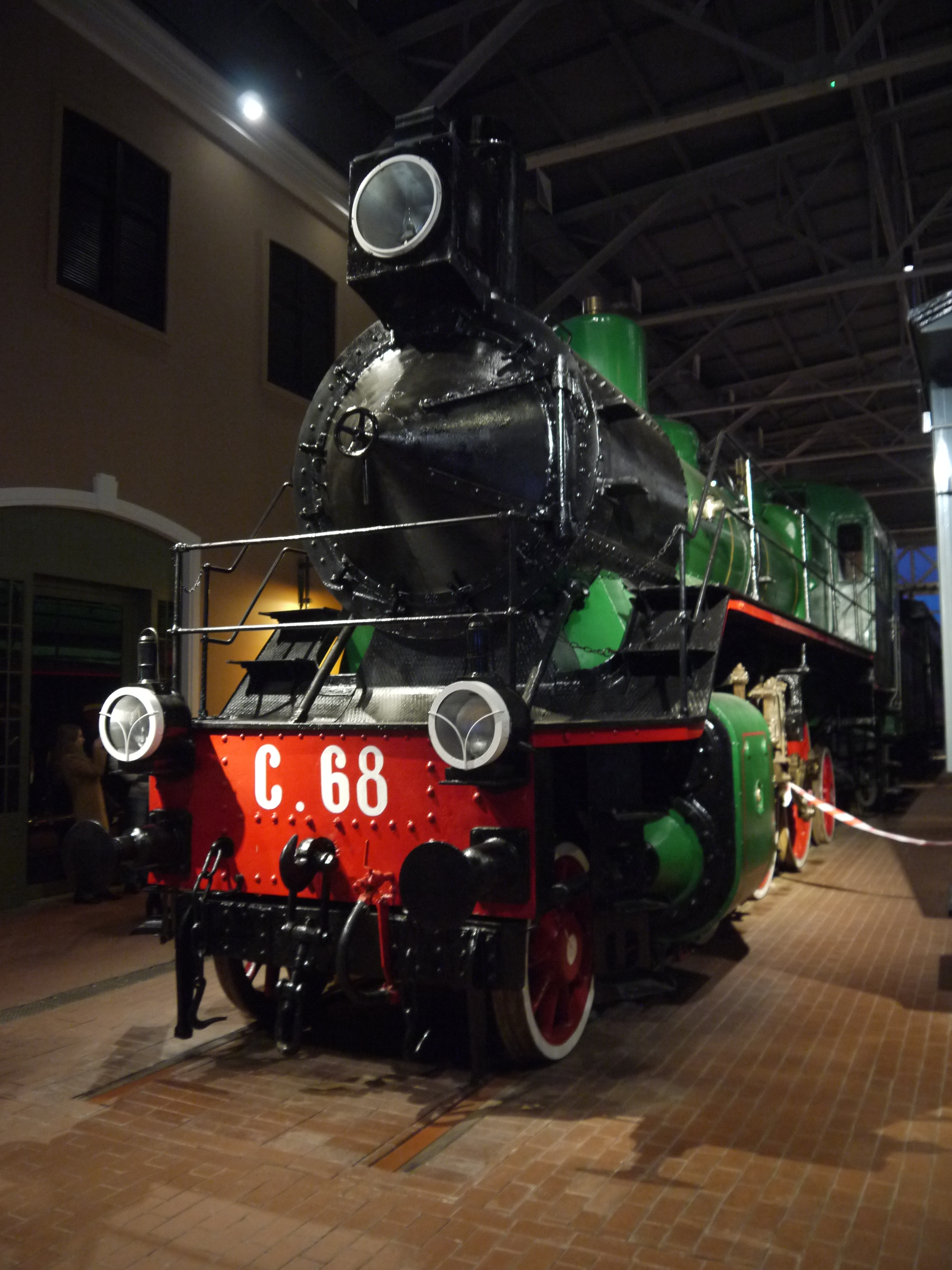
Steam locomotive S.68, one of only 2 surviving pre-revolutionary Russian Passenger locomotives

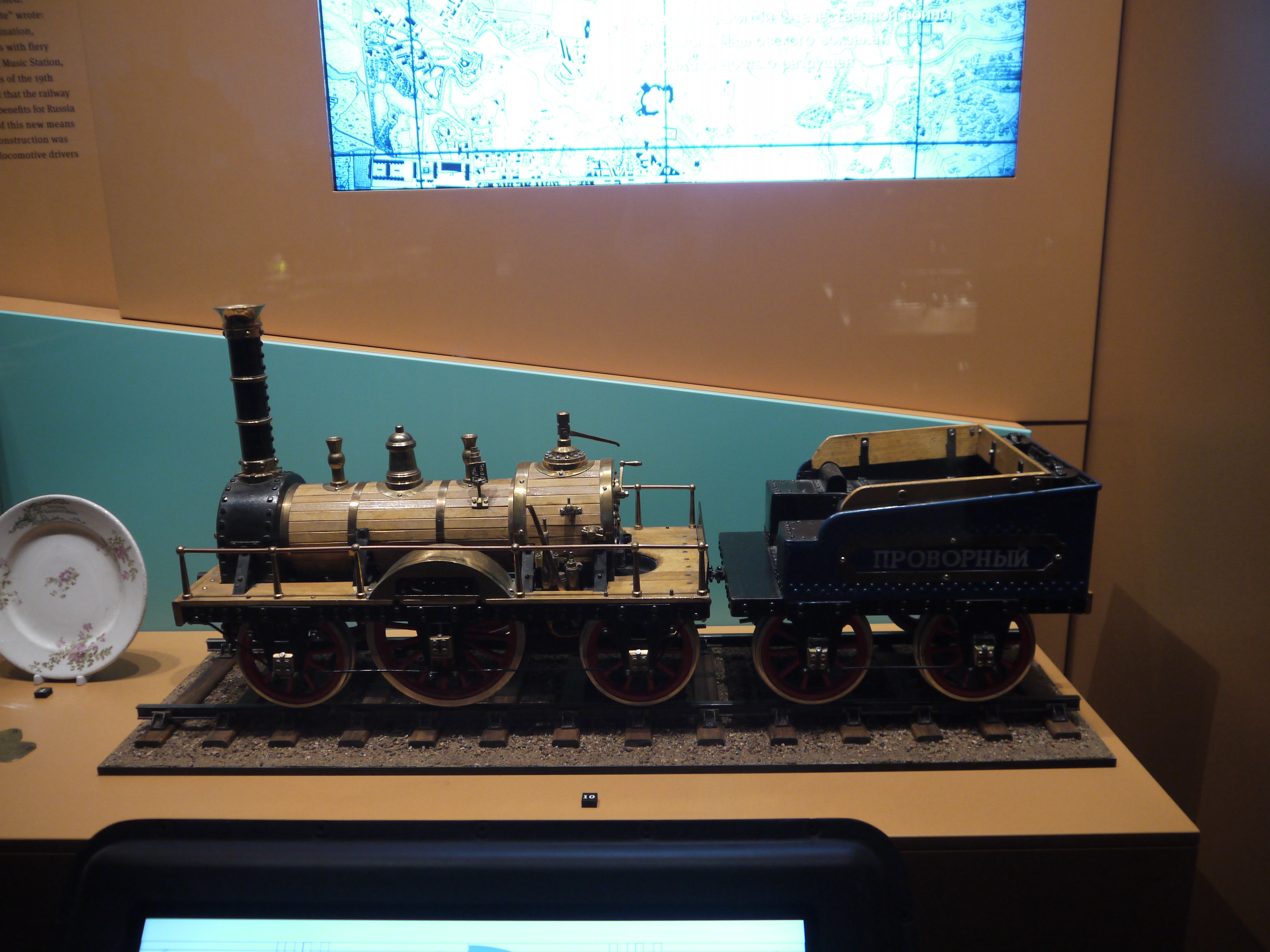
Model of Provorny Russia’s first main line passenger locomotive built by Robert Stephenson and Company for the Tsarskoye Selo Railway

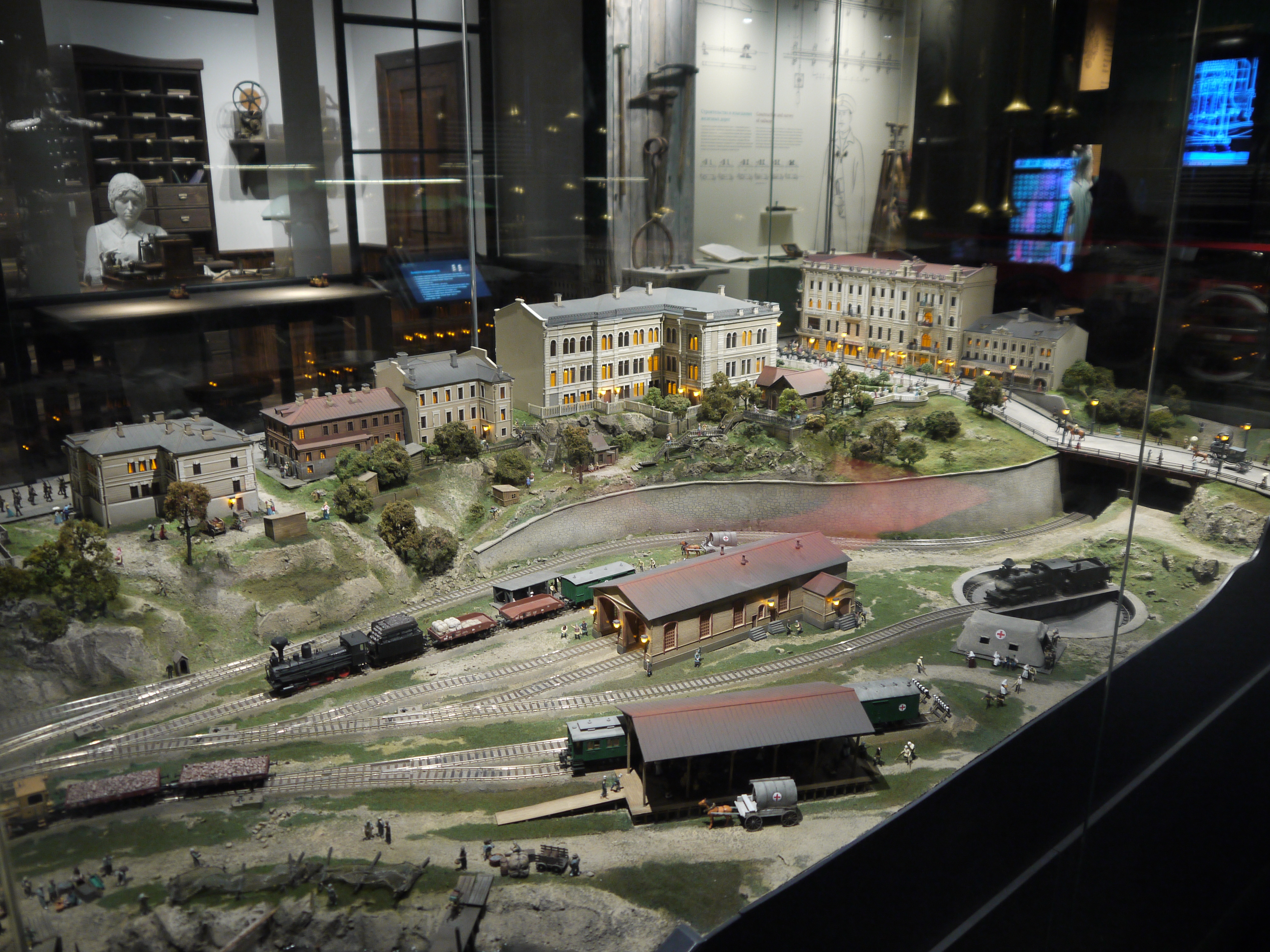
Model Railway of Vladivostok

== See also ==
- The Museum of the Moscow Railway, at Paveletsky railway station, Moscow
- Rizhsky railway station, Home of the Moscow Railway Museum
- History of rail transport in Russia
- List of railway museums (worldwide)
- Heritage railways
- List of heritage railways
- Restored trains
- Finland Station, St.Petersburg
- Emperor railway station in Pushkin town
- List of Russian steam locomotive classes
- Tsarskoye Selo Railway
