= Lomonosovsky District, Leningrad Oblast =

Lomonosovsky District Ломоносовский район (Russian)
- District
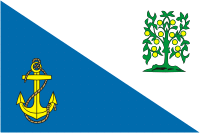
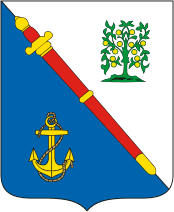
- Flag Coat of arms
- Location of Lomonosovsky District in Leningrad Oblast
- Coordinates: 59°55′N 29°46′E
- Country: Russia
- Federal subject: Leningrad Oblast
- Established: 1 August 1927
- Administrative center: Lomonosov

Area
  - Total: 1,919 km^{2} (741 sq mi)

Population (2010 Census)
  - Total: 70,245
  - Density: 36.61/km^{2} (94.81/sq mi)
  - Urban: 11.4%
  - Rural: 88.6%

Administrative structure
  - Administrative divisions: 13 settlement municipal formation
  - Inhabited localities: 2 urban-type settlements, 141 rural localities

Municipal structure
  - Municipally incorporated as: Lomonosovsky Municipal District
  - Municipal divisions: 2 urban settlements, 13 rural settlements
- Time zone: UTC+3 (MSK)
- OKTMO ID: 41630000
- Website: http://lomonosovlo.ru/

Lomonosovsky District (Russian: Ломоно́совский райо́н) is an administrative and municipal district (raion), one of the seventeen in Leningrad Oblast, Russia. It is located in the west of the oblast and borders with Petrodvortsovy and Krasnoselsky Districts of the Federal city of Saint Petersburg in the east, Gatchinsky District in the southeast, Volosovsky District in the south, Kingiseppsky District in the southwest, and the city of oblast significance of Sosnovy Bor in the west. In the north, the district is bounded by the Gulf of Finland. The area of the district is 1,919 square kilometers (741 sq mi). Its administrative center is the town of Lomonosov (which is not a part of Leningrad Oblast and is located on the territory of the federal city of Saint Petersburg). Population: 70,245 (2010 census); 65,297 (2002 Census); 66,104 (1989 Soviet census).

== Geography ==
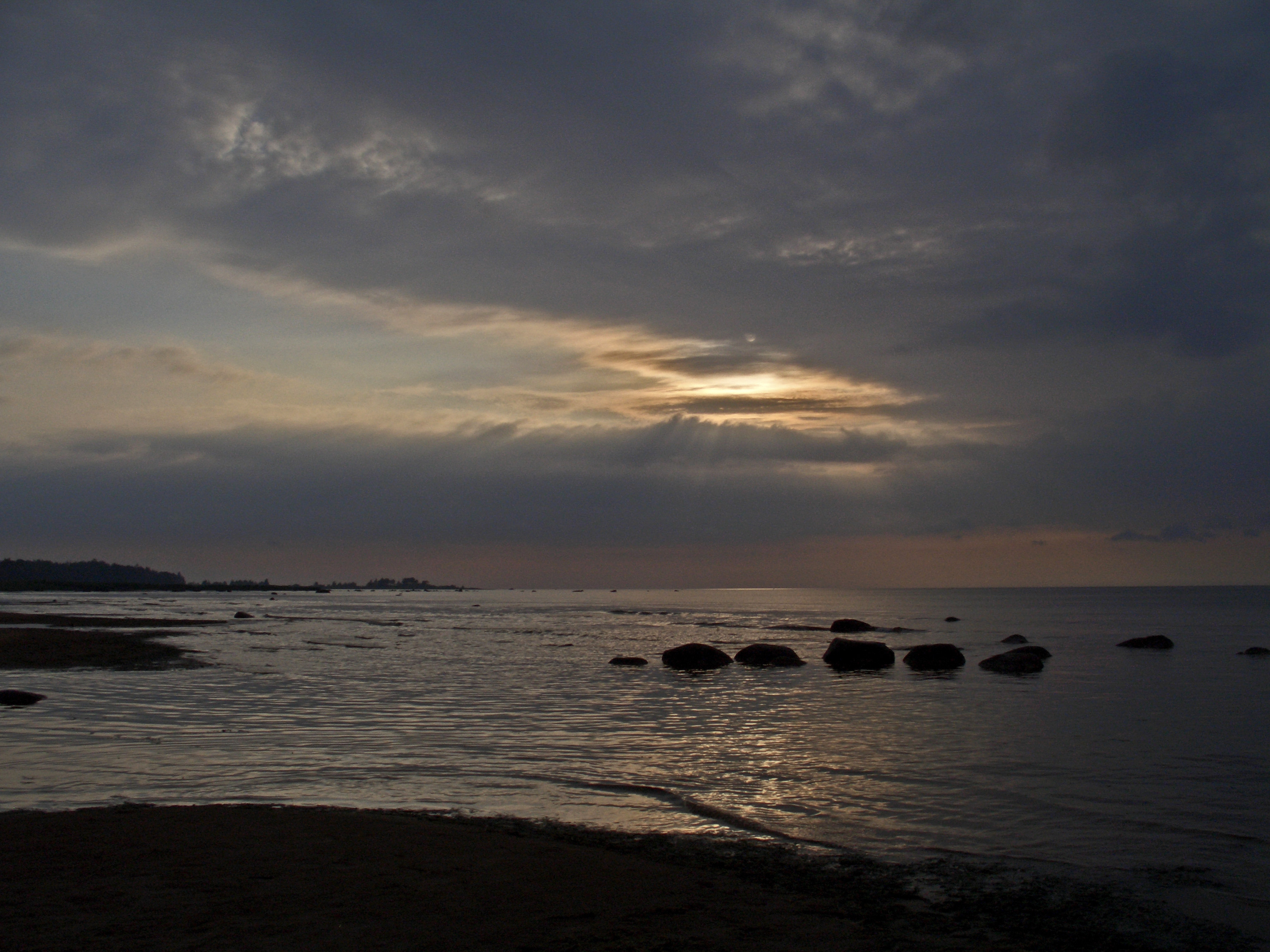
The shore of the Gulf of Finland in the village of Mustovo.

The district is elongated along the shore of the Gulf of Finland and belongs to the drainage basin of the rivers flowing to the gulf, the biggest of which are the Sista and the Kovashi. The inner areas of the district are hilly. There are several lakes in Lomonosovsky District, the biggest of which is Lake Lubenskoye. Much of the area is swampy and forested.

== History ==
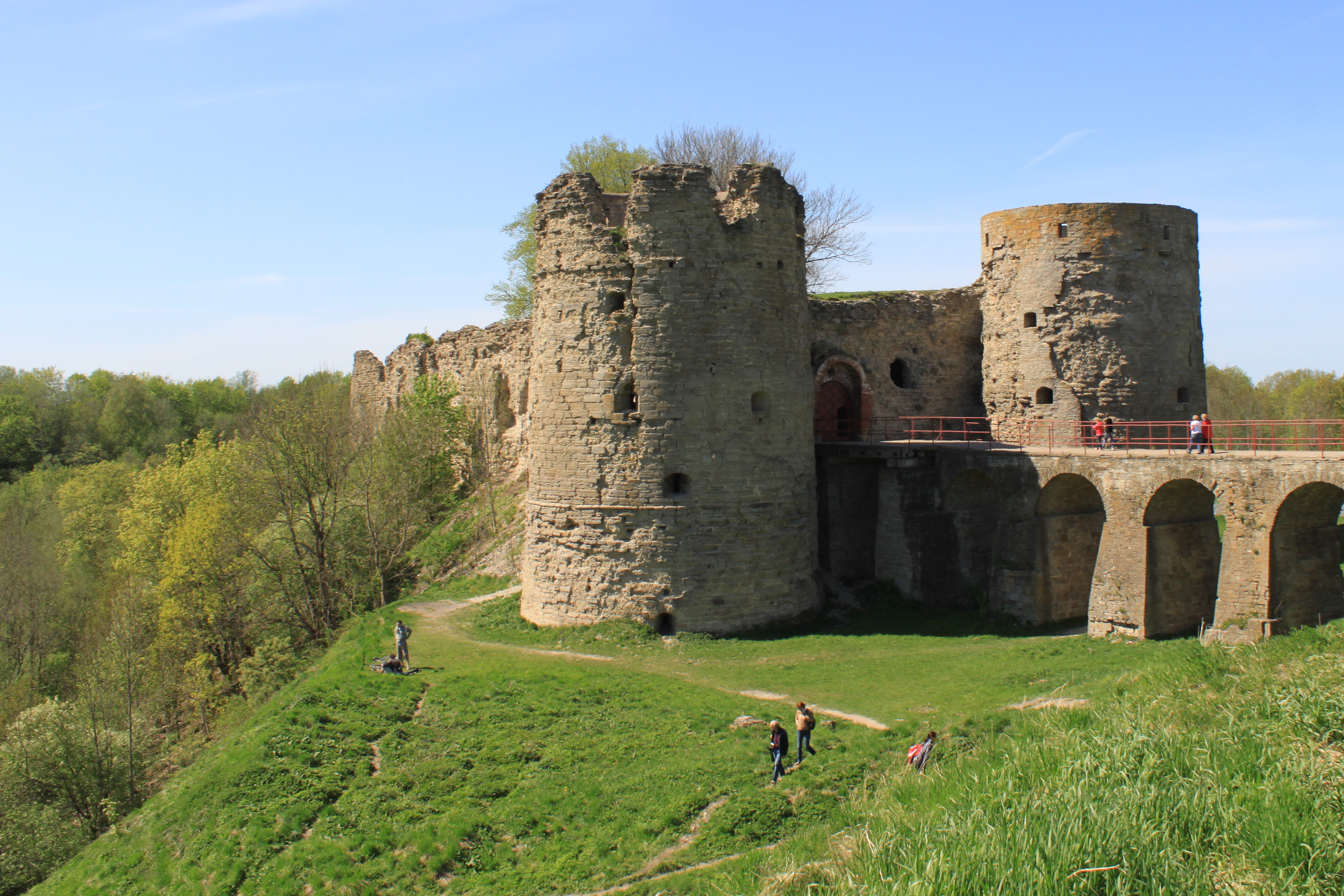
The entrance to the Koporye Fortress

Originally, the area of the district was populated by Finnic peoples. In the 11th century, the Slavs began settling there. The area was dependent on the Novgorod Republic. The Koporye Fortress, one of the fortresses built by Novgorodians to protect the borders, was mentioned first in 1240. From the 15th century, it was annexed together with all Novgorod Lands by the Grand Duchy of Moscow; it belonged to the Vodskaya pyatina, one of the five pyatinas of Novgorod Lands. The area was constantly at the frontier and became the battleground between Germans and Swedes, on one side, and Russians, on the other side. In 1617, according to the Treaty of Stolbovo, the west of the area was transferred to Sweden, and in 1703, during the Great Northern War, it was conquered back by Russia.

In the course of the administrative reform carried out in 1708 by Peter the Great, the area was included into Ingermanland Governorate (known since 1710 as Saint Petersburg Governorate). It later became a part of Petergofsky Uyezds, with the center in Petergof. The governorate was renamed Petrograd in 1914 and Leningrad in 1924. On February 14, 1923 Petergofsky Uyezd was merged with Detskoselsky Uyezd to form Gatchinsky Uyezd, with the administrative center located in Gatchina. On February 14, 1923 Gatchina was renamed Trotsk, and Gatchinsky Uyezd was renamed Trotsky Uyezd, after Leon Trotsky.

On August 1, 1927, the uyezds were abolished and Oranienbaumsky District, with the administrative center in the town of Oranienbaum, was established. The governorates were also abolished, and the district was a part of Leningrad Okrug of Leningrad Oblast. It included parts of former Trotsky Uyezd. On July 23, 1930, the okrugs were abolished as well, and the districts were directly subordinated to the oblast. On August 27, 1939 Bolshaya Izhora was made an urban-type settlement, and on September 17, 1939 Oranienbaum became the city of the oblast significance and ceased to be a part of the district. Between August 1941 and January 1944, during World War II, the western part of the district was occupied by German troops. The eastern part was not occupied and served as the Oranienbaum Bridgehead to protect the city of Leningrad. On February 23, 1948 the town of Oranienbaum was renamed Lomonosov to commemorate Mikhail Lomonosov, and the district was renamed Lomonosovsky. On December 10, 1958 Sosnovy Bor was granted the urban-settlement status. On February 1, 1963 Lomonosovsky District was abolished and merged into Gatchinsky District; on January 13, 1965 it was reestablished. On November 22, 1966 Lebyazhye was granted urban-type settlement status. On April 19, 1973 Sosnovy Bor became a town of oblast significance and ceased to be a part of the district. As a result of a sequence of administrative reforms, the town of Lomonosov was transferred to the federal city of Saint Petersburg, and thus Lomonosovsky District is the only district in Russia which has its administrative center lying in a different federal subject.

On August 1, 1927 Detskoselsky District was established as well, with the administrative center in the town of Detskoye Selo. It was a part of Leningrad Okrug of Leningrad Oblast and included areas formerly belonging to Gatchinsky and Novgorodsky Uyezds. The town of Slutsk was also a part of the district. On August 19, 1930 the district was abolished and split between Tosnensky, Krasnogvardeysky, and Leningradsky Prigorodny Districts.

On August 1, 1927 Uritsky District was also established, with the administrative center in the town of Uritsk. It was a part of Leningrad Okrug of Leningrad Oblast and included areas formerly belonging to Gatchinsky and Leningradsky Uyezds. The town of Krasnoye Selo was also a part of the district. On August 19, 1930 the district was abolished and merged into Leningradsky Prigorodny District. Leningradsky Prigorodny District was established on August 19, 1930 by merging Leninsky District, Uritsky District, as well as parts of Detskoselsky, Kolpinsky, and Pargolovsky Districts, and the towns of Petergof, Sestroretsk, and Shlisselburg. The administrative center of the district was located in Leningrad. On December 13, 1931 Leningradsky Prigorodny District was subordinated to the city of Leningrad (which was not a part of the district). On August 19, 1936 the district was abolished, and split between the city of Leningrad, and Krasnoselsky, Slutsky, Pargolovsky, Vsevolozhsky, and Mginsky Districts.

On August 19, 1936 Krasnoselsky District with the administrative center in the town of Krasnoye Selo was established on the territories which previously belonged to Leningradsky Prigorodny District. Between August, 1941 and January, 1944 the area of the district was occupied by German troops. On June 12, 1950 some parts of the district, including the town of Uritsk, were transferred to the city of Leningrad. On December 14, 1955 Krasnoselsky District was abolished and merged into Lomonosovsky District. As a result of a sequence of administrative reforms, the town of Krasnoye Selo was transferred to the federal city of Saint Petersburg.

== Restricted access ==
The part of the coast of the Gulf of Finland adjacent to the town of Sosnovy Bor, including the urban-type settlement of Lebyazhye, is included into the border security zone, intended to protect the borders of Russia from unwanted activity. In order to visit the zone, a permit issued by the local Federal Security Service department is required.

== Economy ==
=== Industry ===
There are enterprises of timber, machine building, and food industries in the district.

=== Agriculture ===
The main agricultural specializations of the district are cattle breeding with meat and milk production, poultry production, and fish farming.

=== Transportation ===
A railway connecting the Baltiysky railway station of Saint Petersburg with Veymarn crosses the district, largely following the seashore. The eastern stretch between Saint Petersburg and Sosnovy Bor is served by suburban connections. There is no passenger service west of Sosnovy Bor. The main railway station within the limits of the district is Lebyazhye.

The A180 highway, connecting Saint Petersburg and Ivangorod, crosses the southeastern part of the district, and the A120 highway, which encircles Saint Petersburg, crosses its eastern part, terminating in Bolshaya Izhora at the seashore. The A180 highway coincides with the European route E20 connecting Saint Petersburg via Tallinn with Shannon Airport. Generally, the district has an extensive network of local roads.

== Culture and recreation ==
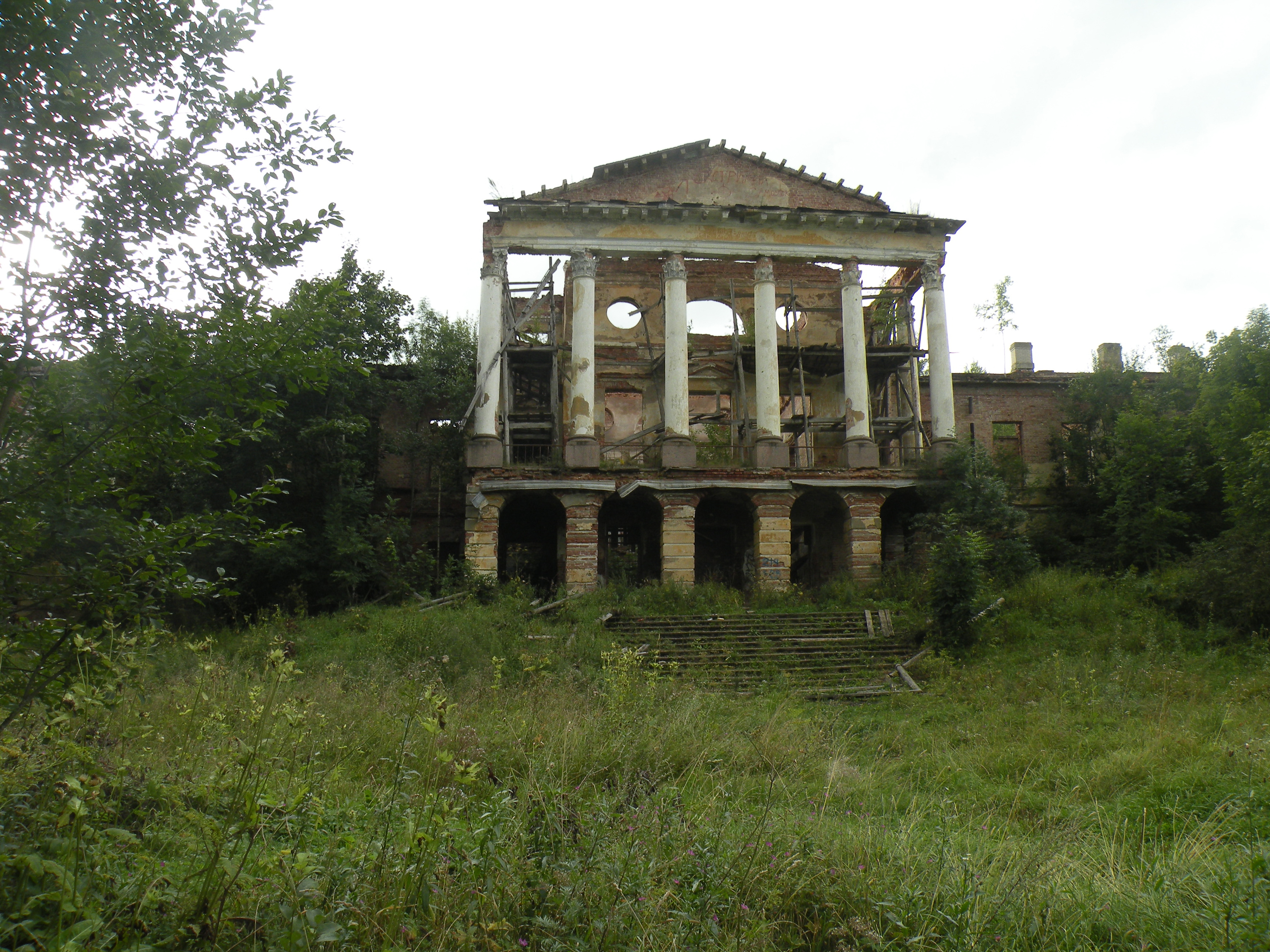
The Ropsha Palace in 2012

The eastern part of Lomonosovsky District is and always was a part of the greater Saint Petersburg area, therefore it was attractive for aristocracy as a location to build their estates. The district contains over a hundred cultural heritage monuments of federal and local. The federally designated monuments include the medieval Koporye Fortress, the Gostilitsy Estate in the village of Gostilitsy, built in the 18th century and redesigned in the 1840s by Andrei Stackenschneider, the complex of the postal station in the village of Kipen, built in the 1800s, and the Ropsha Estate in the settlement of Ropsha, built in the 18th century under the general supervision of Francesco Bartolomeo Rastrelli, and in the 1790s was the imperial estate owned by Tsar Paul I. Ensembles of Gostilitsy and Ropsha, as well as four roads stretching out of Saint Petersburg — Tallinskoye Highway (A180), Peterhofskoe Highway, Ropshinskoe Highway, and Gostilitskoe Highway — are a part of World Heritage site Historic Centre of Saint Petersburg and Related Groups of Monuments. As of 2012, both Ropsha and Gostilitsy were deserted and at the verge of collapse.

The Koporye Fortress functions as a museum.
