= Soviet locomotive class LV =

Class of 2-10-2 steam freight locomotives

Soviet locomotive class ЛВ
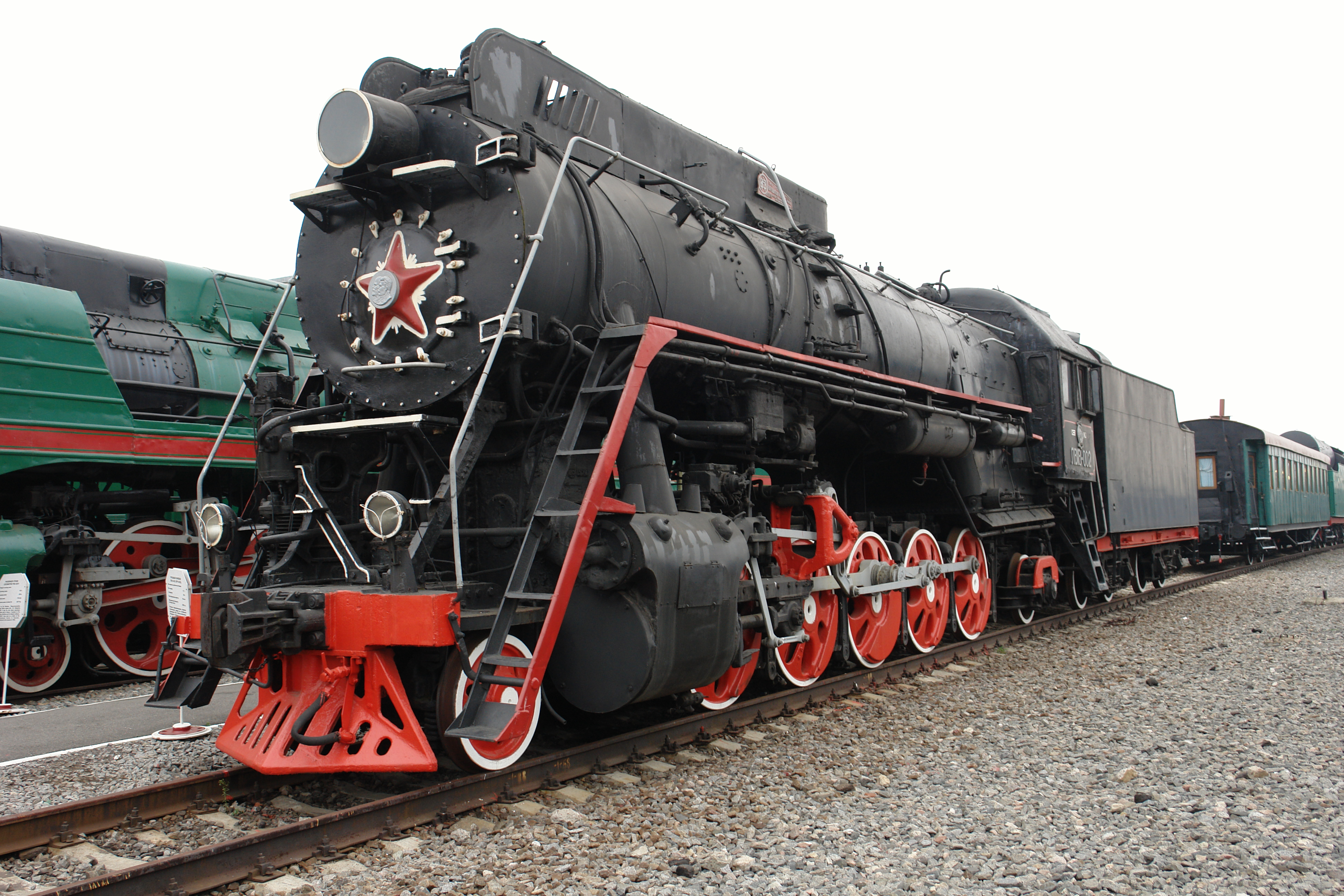
- Locomotive LV18-002 at the St. Petersburg Railway Museum at Warsaw Station
Type and origin
- Power type: Steam
- Builder: Voroshilovgrad (Luhansk) Locomotive Factory
- Build date: 1952-1956
- Total produced: 522
Specifications
- Configuration
  - Whyte: 2-10-2
- Gauge: 1,524 mm (5 ft)
- Leading dia.: 900 mm (35.43 in)
- Driver dia.: 1,500 mm (59.06 in)
- Trailing dia.: 1,050 mm (41.34 in)
- Length: 14.789 m (48 ft 6 in) (w/o tender), 24.710 m (81 ft 1 in) (with 4-axle tender)
- Adhesive weight: 104.0 t (102.4 long tons; 114.6 short tons)
- Loco weight: 123.4 t (121.5 long tons; 136.0 short tons)
- Fuel type: Coal, oil (FD^{P})
- Firebox
  - Grate area: 45 m^{2} (480 sq ft)
- Boiler pressure: 14 kgf/cm^{2} (1.37 MPa; 199 psi)
- Superheater
  - Type: Dvuhoborotny
  - Heating area: 136.5 m^{2} (1,469 sq ft) (No. 1), 149.2 m^{2} (1,606 sq ft)
- Cylinders: Two, outside
- Cylinder size: 650 mm × 800 mm (25.59 in × 31.50 in) bore x stroke
Performance figures
- Maximum speed: 80 km/h (50 mph)
- Tractive effort: 262.3 kN (58,970 lbf)
Career
- Operators: Russian Railways
- Class: ЛВ
- Numbers: ЛВ-01 - ЛВ-0522
- Locale: Russia
- Retired: 1960-1983
- Preserved: 28
- Scrapped: 1960-1991

The Soviet locomotive class LV (Russian: ЛВ) was a Soviet main freight steam locomotive type. Between 1952 and 1956, 522 locomotives were built.

== Development ==
The class LV locomotive was designed as a successor to the class L 2-10-0, which had been a successful design developed during World War II. However, by the late 1940s some drawbacks to the design, including poor operating qualities when operating in reverse, had become apparent. In 1949 the General Directorate of the Ministry of Railways authorized the development of a new 2-10-2 locomotive. Voroshilovgrad Works in Voroshilovgrad, Ukrainian SSR (now Luhansk, Ukraine), began designing the new locomotive and the prototype was ready in 1951. Initially the class was designated OR18, with the prototype locomotive numbered OR18-01, but the designation was later changed to class LV.

In addition to a new boiler and firebox, advancements over the class L included a centralized lubrication system, pneumatic grates, power reverse, and roller bearings on all axles. Upon arrival at the SZD testing facility in June 1952 the prototype locomotive was closely examined and found to exceed previous types in tractive effort and horsepower. It was also shown to be the most efficient design then in operation in Russia, with thermal efficiency of 9.27%. Locomotive OR18-01 was placed into revenue service at Lublin Depot in August 1953.

Following the successful test of OR18-01, a second locomotive was constructed in November 1953 incorporating minor changes, with two more pre-production locomotives produced during early 1954. Later in that year the first six production locomotives were built and the class designation was changed to LV (though the four prototypes were renumbered with LV18, rather than LV, prefixes). The six production locomotives, LV-0005 to LV-0010, were built with plain bearings but were designed to be converted to roller bearings later.

The success of the initial batch of production locomotives resulted in Voroshilovgrad Works beginning mass production of class LV locomotives in 1955. Locomotives 0011-0112 were produced in the first year, with another 400 locomotives numbered 0113-0522 completed in 1956. Some changes were made during the course of the production run. Different combinations of plain bearings and roller bearings were produced, and starting with number 0026 a six-axle tender was substituted for the four-axle tender used with earlier locomotives. The drawbar connection between the locomotive and tender was also strengthened at the same time.

Initially it was planned to construct 3,000 locomotives of class LV, but in February 1956 at the 20th Communist Party Congress it was decided that a broad program of railway modernization would be embarked upon. Diesel-electric and electric locomotives were to supplant steam locomotives, on which construction would cease. With this decision the production of class LV locomotives was cut off, as was work on a more powerful 2-10-2 under development designated class OR21, of which only four were ever built in 1953 and 1954. At the end of 1956, locomotive LV-0522 became the last steam locomotive completed at Voroshilovgrad Works.

The designs of the LV and OR21 both influenced the Chinese class QJ (Chinese: 前进; pinyin: Qián Jìn; lit. 'To go forward" or "to advance') 2-10-2s, which consisted of over 4,700 examples built in the People's Republic of China from 1956 to 1988, and lasted in mainline service until 2005.

== Operation ==
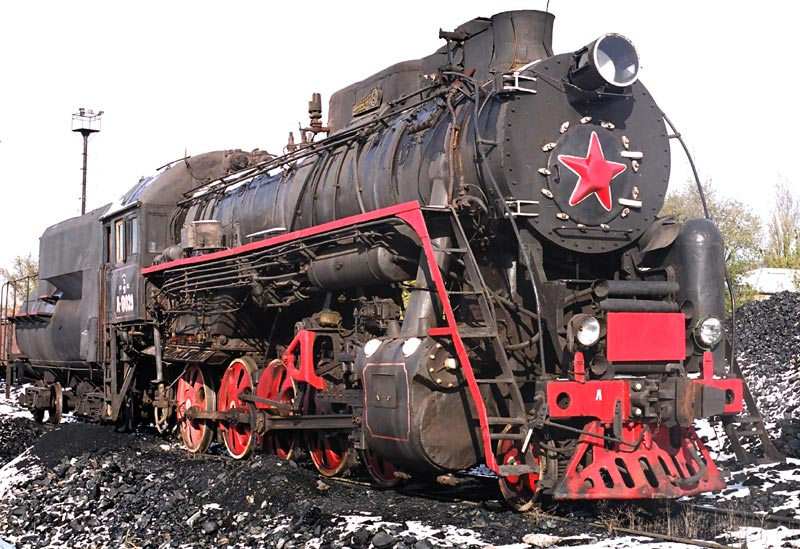
A class L locomotive

The first prototype of class LV entered service on the Moscow-Kursk-Donbas line, operating out of Lublin Depot from August 1953 to April 1954 in testing. Once the type entered production, they were no longer used on this line as they were more powerful than needed. Production locomotives entered service on the South Urals, East Siberian and Krasnoyarsk railway lines, where following their introduction train weights increased by 25-30% and coal consumption fell 12-14% on average. Despite good operational results there were obstacles in introducing the locomotives, including the length of locomotives with six-axles tenders, which made it impossible to turn them at depots with turntables smaller than 30 metres (98 ft).

In 1959, with electrification of the main line of the Trans-Siberian Railway, locomotives operating on that line out of Kartali Depot were transferred to the Tselinnoe, Northern, Kemerovo and South Urals railway lines. As of 1976 there were still 521 locomotives of the class in operation on the Northern (168 locomotives), Kazakh (209 locomotives), Sverdlovsk (35 locomotives), South Urals (34 locomotives), and West Siberian (75 locomotives) lines. However retirement of steam locomotives began in earnest in the late 1960s and eventually all locomotives of this type were retired.

== Preserved Locomotives ==
=== In working condition ===
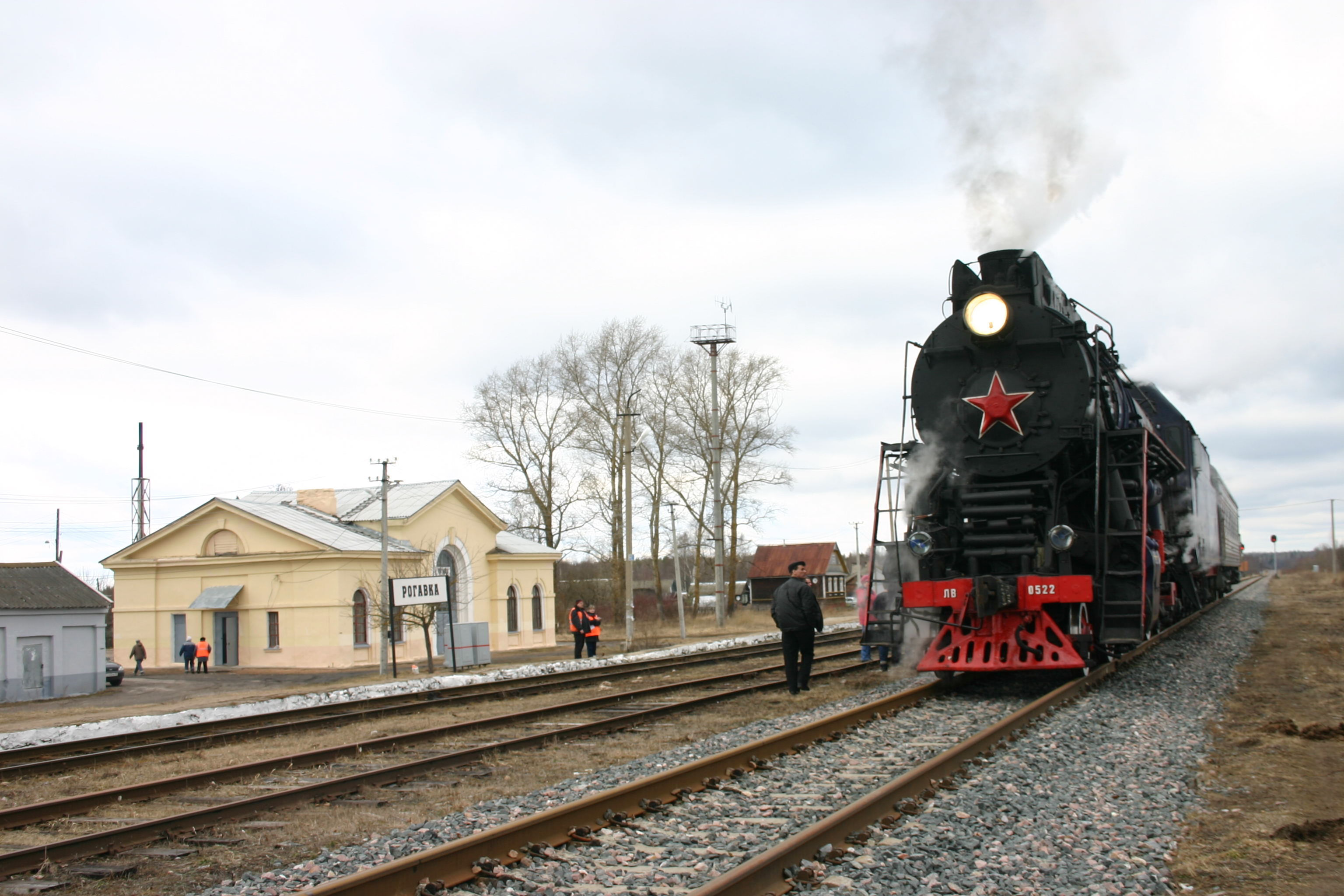
LV-0522 on Rogavka station.

- LV-0123 — Sverdlovsk Region, Russia: restored to working order at Tikhoretsk in 2017
- LV-0165 — Chrysostom Depot, Troitsk, Chelyabinsk oblast, Russia
- LV-0182 — Podmoskovnaya Depot, Moscow, Russia
- LV-0233 — Tikhoretsk, Krasnodar Region, Russia
- LV-0283 — Podmoskovnaya Depot, Moscow, Russia
- LV-0522 — Moscow, Podmoskovnaya Depot, Russia

=== Conserved ===
- LV-0041 — At Tikhoretsk, Russia, for restoration to working order
- LV-0192 — Podmoskovnaya Depot, Moscow, Russia
- LV-0355 — At Tikhoretsk for restoration to working order
- LV-0415 — "Pioneer Park" the October Railway, Lebyazhe, Leningrad oblast, Russia

=== In museums ===
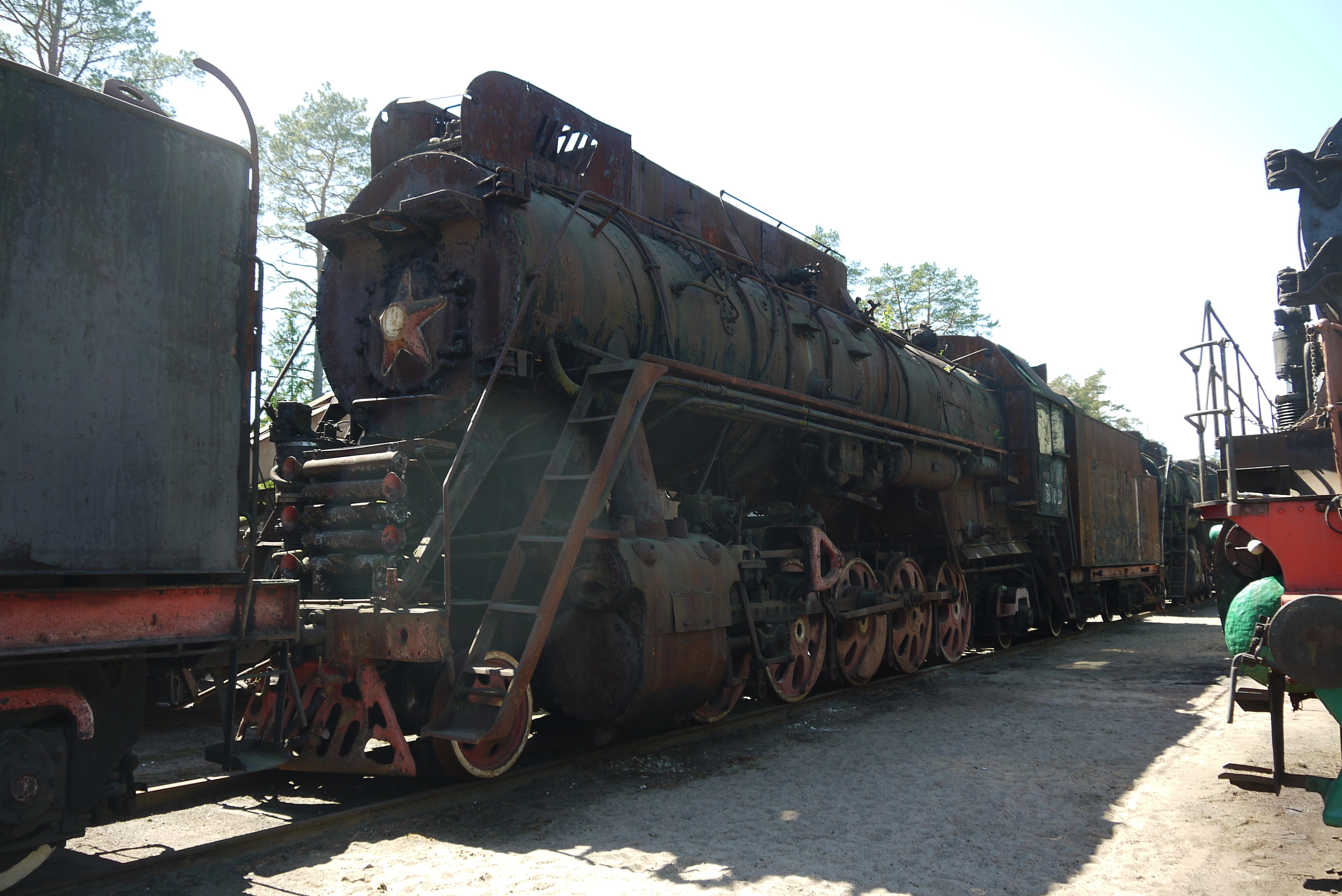
OR18-01 at Lebyazhye Railway Museum, Lebyazhye, Lomonosovsky District, Leningrad Oblast, Russia

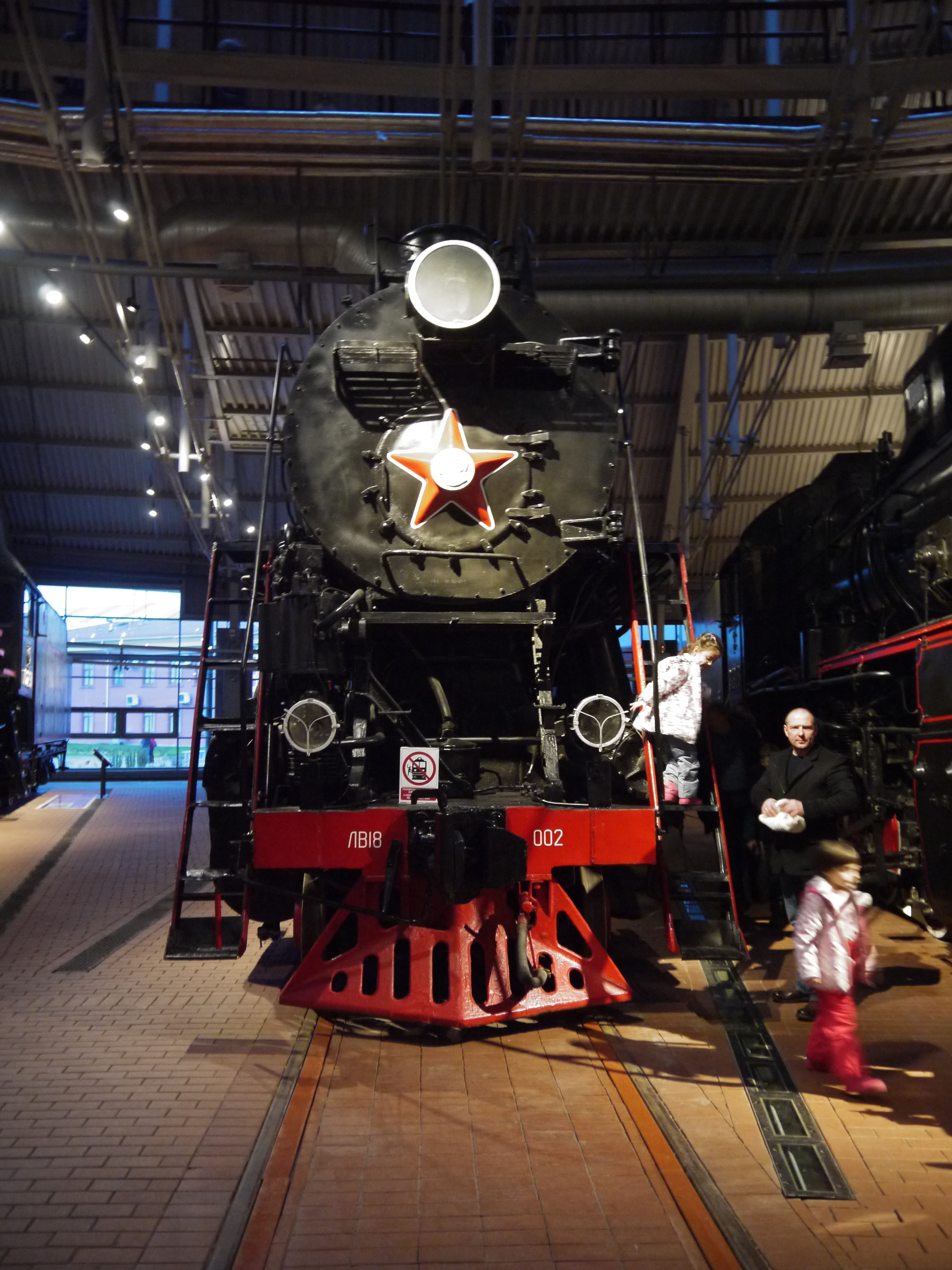
LV18-02 at the Russian Railway Museum Saint Petersburg, Russia

- LV18-01 — Lebyazhye Railway Museum, Lebyazhye, Lomonosovsky District, Leningrad Oblast, Russia
- LV18-002 — Russian Railway Museum Saint Petersburg, Russia
- LV-0040 — Novosibirsk Railway Museum, Russia
- LV-0202 — Brest Railway Museum, Belarus
- LV-0225 — Nizhny Novgorod Railway Museum, Russia
- LV-0268 — Samara Railway Museum, Russia
- LV-0333 — Rostov Railway Museum, Yaroslavl Oblast, Russia
- LV-0407 — Donetsk Museum, Ukraine
- LV-0420 — October Railway Museum, Shushary, Russia
- LV-0428 — Chelyabinsk Railway Museum, Russia
- LV-0441 — Moscow Railway Museum, Russia
- LV-0487 — Tashkent Railway Museum, Uzbekistan

=== Memorial steam locomotive ===
- LV-0190 — Kyzylordy, Qyzylorda, Kazakhstan
- LV-0197 — Vologda Depot, Vologda, Russia
- LV-0478 — Pechora Depot, Komi Republic, Russia

=== Abandoned ===
- LV-0044 — Zlatoust, Russia
- LV-0092 — Embi, Kazakhstan
- LV-0096 — Shchuchinsk, Aqmola, Kazakhstan
- LV-0348 — Astana, Kazakhstan
- LV-0387 — Shchuchinsk, Aqmola, Kazakhstan

== See also ==
- Russian Railway Museum, St. Petersburg
- The Museum of the Moscow Railway, at Paveletsky Rail Terminal, Moscow
- Rizhsky Rail Terminal, Home of the Moscow Railway Museum
- Finland Station, St. Petersburg
- History of rail transport in Russia
