= Petergofsky Uyezd =

Subdivision of Saint Petersburg Governorate, Russian Empire

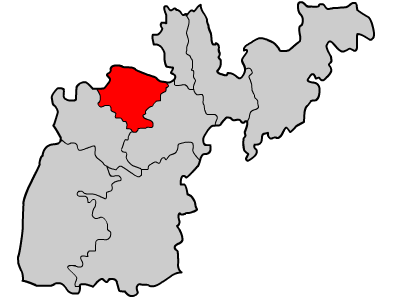

Petergofsky Uyezd (Russian: Петергофский уезд) was one of the eight subdivisions of the Saint Petersburg Governorate of the Russian Empire. Its capital was Petergof. Petergofsky Uyezd was located in the northern part of the governorate (in the central part of the present-day Leningrad Oblast). In terms of present-day administrative borders, Petergofsky Uyezd is divided between the Petrodvortsovy and Kronshtadtsky districts of Saint Petersburg and the Lomonosovsky and Volosovsky districts of Leningrad Oblast.

== Demographics ==
At the time of the Russian Empire Census of 1897, Petergofsky Uyezd had a population of 140,547. Of these, 67.7% spoke Russian, 13.2% Finnish, 6.2% Estonian, 4.7% Ingrian, 2.4% German, 1.9% Polish, 1.0% Ukrainian, 0.9% Yiddish, 0.6% Latvian, 0.4% Tatar, 0.3% Belarusian, 0.2% Swedish and 0.1% Lithuanian as their native language.
