= U (disambiguation) =

U, or u, is the twenty-first letter of the English alphabet.

U may also refer to:

== Science ==
=== Mathematics ===
- $\cup$, union (set theory)
- U-set, a set of uniqueness
- U, the unitary group

=== Chemistry ===
- Uranium, symbol U, a chemical element
- u, the Dalton (unit), a unified atomic mass unit to express atomic and molecular masses

=== Astronomy ===
- U, ultraviolet magnitude, in a UBV photometric system
- U, an October 16 through 31 discovery in the provisional designation of a comet
- U (trans-Neptunian object), a possible extremely distant trans-Neptunian object

=== Computing ===
- <u>, a HTML element denoting underlined text: see underscore#HTML <u> and CSS
- 'U' (or sometimes RU) is a standard height unit of measure in rack units, with each U equal to 44.50 millimetres (1.75 in)
- U, universal Turing machine
- The prefix U+ (then a number) is used to indicate a codepoint as being in the Unicode character encoding system (to distinguish it from other encoding systems). For example, the codepoints for the letters ⟨U⟩ and ⟨u⟩ are given formally as U+0055 U LATIN CAPITAL LETTER U and U+0075 u LATIN SMALL LETTER U.

=== Biology ===
- U, abbreviation for uracil
- U, mitochondrial haplogroup U

=== Other scientific uses ===
- U, a common notation for potential energy
- U, the middle of an edge joining a hexagonal and a square face of the Brillouin zone of a face-centered cubic lattice, in solid-state physics
- U, representing a 10x10x10cm CubeSat
- U, one of the two subcarrier-modulated color-difference channels in the YUV colorspace, in video
- U, the recommended symbol for a system's internal energy, in thermodynamics
- U, units, any of various standard units of biological activity, such as insulin units, enzyme units, or penicillin units
  - U, the enzyme unit
  - International units, for which the symbol U is sometimes used
- U, the abbreviation for selenocysteine, an uncommon amino acid containing selenium
- u, the alternative abbreviation for the SI prefix "micro-" when the Greek letter mu (μ) is not available
- U or U-value, the symbol for the overall heat transfer coefficient or thermal transmittance
- Understeer gradient

== Transportation ==
- U Line, also known as the Uijeongbu Line, a light metro line in Seoul
- Transilien Line U, a line of the Paris transport network
- U (Los Angeles Railway), a former streetcar line in Los Angeles
- Yurikamome, an automated guideway line in Tokyo, labeled
- The official West Japan Railway Company service symbol for:
  - Sakurai Line.
  - Kibi Line.

== Music ==
- ’u’, the first opera in the Klingon language
- U (Incredible String Band album), 1970
- U (NiziU album), 2021
- U (Tourist album), 2016 album by Tourist
- U (Underscores album), 2026
- "U" (song), by Super Junior, 2006
- "U", a song by Kendrick Lamar from To Pimp a Butterfly
- "U", a song by KNK from Remain
- "U", a song by Pearl Jam on their album Lost Dogs
- "U", a song by Stray Kids on their mixtape Hop
- "U", a song by S.E.S., released in 2002
- "U", an album by The Enid, released in 2019
- "U", a song by Treasure, released in 2022

== People ==
- An honorific used in Burmese names
- An alternative spelling of Woo (Korean surname), including a list of people with that family name
- An alternative spelling of Woo (Korean given name), including a list of people with that given name
- U of Goryeo (1363–1389), king of Goryeo (Korea), often called King Woo

== Places ==
- U, Federated States of Micronesia
- Ü-Tsang, one of three historical provinces of Tibet
  - Ü (region), a particular region of Ü-Tsang

== Language ==
- /u/, the close back rounded vowel in the International Phonetic Alphabet
- U language, a language spoken by about 40,000 people in the Yunnan Province of China
- U (cuneiform), a cuneiform sign
- U (Cyrillic), a letter of the Cyrillic script
- U (kana), a Japanese syllabary symbol
- U and non-U English, sociolectal varieties of British English, i.e. "upper-class"
- U (Armenian letter) (ՈՒ, ու), an Armenian diagraph
- u, an abbreviation for "you" in computer chats
- U-, a prefix used for German submarines during World War II
- U, a title roughly equal to "Mister" in Burmese
- The Greek letter μ

== Film and television episodes ==
- U (film), a 2006 French animated feature film directed by Serge Elissalde and Grégoire Solotareff
- The U (film), a 2009 documentary about the Miami Hurricanes football team
- U, the production code for the 1965 Doctor Who serial The Myth Makers

== Media ==
- U (Universal), a media content rating used in the following countries:
  - United Kingdom, issued by the British Board of Film Classification
  - India, issued by the Central Board of Film Certification
  - Malaysia, issued by the Film Censorship Board of Malaysia
  - France, documented at Censorship in France
  - India, Latvia, Malta, Mauritius and Slovakia, documented at Motion picture content rating system and Television content rating system
- U (TV channel), a former television channel in New Zealand
- Channel U (Singaporean TV channel), a Singaporean Chinese-language television channel
- Univisión, an American Spanish-language television network with the "U" logo
- U (streaming service), (formerly UKTV Play) a free British streaming service owned by UKTV

== Other uses ==
- University, commonly abbreviated "U"
- U Mobile, Malaysian mobile phone and data service provider
- U-bend, a U-shaped plumbing trap
- U-bolt, a U-shaped metal fastener
- Ⓤ, (U inside a circle), hechsher or kosher certification by the Orthodox Union
- U, =U= or -U-, symbol for Ustaše Croatian movement
- Nickname for football teams:
  - La U or Universitario de Deportes, Peru
  - Universitatea Cluj, Romania
- U, the color blue in Magic: The Gathering
- Wii U, the sixth Nintendo video game home console, released in 2012
- Uniform, the military time zone code for UTC−08:00
- "U" Is for Undertow, the twenty-first novel in Sue Grafton's "Alphabet" mystery series, published in 2009
- Underscore, originally invoked in HTML using <u>
- U, a brand of menstrual hygiene products by Kotex
- U, the logo for Unilever

== See also ==
- The U (disambiguation)
- U class (disambiguation)
- You (disambiguation)
- Yoo (disambiguation)
- Yu (disambiguation)
- Yew (disambiguation)
