= Yu Di =

Yu Di or Yudi may refer to:

- Jade Emperor (Chinese: 玉帝; pinyin: Yù Dì), supreme sovereign in Chinese folk religions
- Shun the Great, also known as Emperor Yu (Chinese: 虞帝; pinyin: Yú Dì), semi-mythical ruler of ancient China
- Yu the Great, also known as Emperor Yu (Chinese: 禹帝; pinyin: Yǔ Dì), semi-mythical ruler of ancient China
- Yu Di (Tang dynasty) (于頔; died 818), minister and warlord during the Tang dynasty
- Yu Di (singer) (余笛; born 1981), Chinese singer-songwriter and musical actor
- Yudi Township (Chinese: 腴地乡; pinyin: Yúdì Xiāng), a township in Youyang County, Chongqing, China
- Yudi language, a variety of Arabic spoken by Jews formerly living in Libya

== See also ==
- UD (disambiguation)
- Di (disambiguation)
  - Di (surname)
- Yu (disambiguation)
  - Yu (Chinese given name)
  - Yu (Chinese surname)
