= Uoo =

Uoo may refer to:

== Public universities ==
- University of Oxford, Oxford, England
- University of Otago, Dunedin, Otago, New Zealand
- University of Oregon, Eugene, Oregon, United States

== Other uses ==
- Directorate of Special Departments within NKVD USSR (Russian: Управление Особых Отделов при НКВД СССР), abbreviated UOO, an organization created in 1941 to conduct military counterintelligence
- Stewart Uoo (born 1985), American artist

== See also ==
- Yoo (disambiguation)
- Yu (disambiguation)
- Wu (disambiguation)
