= You (disambiguation) =

You is the second-person pronoun in English.

You may also refer to:

== Arts and media ==
=== Fictional characters ===
- You Watanabe, from the media-mix project Love Live! Sunshine!!
- You Yamane, from the video game Inazuma Eleven

=== Books and magazines ===
- You (Grossman novel), 2013, by Austin Grossman
- You (Kepnes novel), a 2014 thriller novel by Caroline Kepnes
- You, English edition of Du, German youth novel by Zoran Drvenkar
- You (British magazine), a women's section in the Mail On Sunday newspaper
- You (Japanese magazine), a josei manga magazine published by Shueisha
  - Young You, a spin-off manga magazine aimed at young women, published by Shueisha
- You (South African magazine), a multi-ethnic family magazine
- You (Time Person of the Year), Time magazine's 2006 honoring of user-generated content

=== Film and television ===
- You (1963 film), short by István Szabó
- You (2007 film), 2007 Canadian drama directed by François Delisle
- You (2009 film), 2009 feature film directed by and starring Melora Hardin
- You (TV series), a 2018 American drama based on the Kepnes novel
- TV You, the former name of defunct British television channel UTV2

=== Music ===
==== Albums ====
- You (Aretha Franklin album) or the title song, 1975
- You (Bang Gang album), 1998
- You (Gong album), 1974
- You (James Arthur album) or the title song (see below), 2019
- You (Juju album) or the title song, 2011
- You (Kate Havnevik album), 2011
- You (Phillip LaRue album) or the title song, 2015
- You (Tuxedomoon album) or the title song, 1987
- Y-O-U (album), by Y-O-U, 2003
- You, by Ali Gatie, 2019
- You, by Bob Snider, 1989
- You, by the Kolors, 2017
- You (Being My Body Whole), by Von Hemmling, 2008
- You, an EP by Dodie Clark, or the title song, 2017

==== Songs ====
See You (song)

== People ==
=== Names ===
- You (Chinese given name), several people
- You (surname), several Chinese family names
- Yō (also spelled You), several Japanese given names

=== Individuals ===
- Yabby You or Yabby U, stage name of Vivian Neville Jackson (1946–2010), Jamaican reggae musician
- You (actress) (born 1964), Japanese actress and singer
- You (Janne Da Arc), or Yutaka Tsuda (born 1974), member of Janne Da Arc
- You Shiina, Japanese illustrator and manga artist
- Yuji Adachi (1964–2020), also known as You, Japanese musician

== Places ==
- You County, in Hunan Province, China
- You River (Guangxi), a tributary of the Pearl River, China
- You River (Yuan River tributary), in the Wuling Mountains, China

== Other uses ==
- You (vessel), a type of ancient Chinese bronzeware
- You.com, a search engine
- Yemeni Omani United, a mobile network operator in Yemen

== See also ==
- Ewe, adult female sheep
- U, the 21st letter and the fifth vowel in the ISO basic Latin alphabet
- U (disambiguation)
- Yew (disambiguation)
- Yoo (disambiguation)
- Yoo (Korean surname)
- Yours (disambiguation)
- YouX, University of Adelaide student union, Australia
- You FM (disambiguation)
- Yu (disambiguation)
