= Yuu =

Yuu or YUU may refer to:

- Yū, Yamaguchi, or Yuu, a town in Kuga District, Yamaguchi Prefecture, Japan
- Yuu (wrestler), Japanese professional wrestler
- Yuu Shiina, usually written You Shiina, Japanese illustrator and manga artist
- yuu Rewards Club, a Hong Kongese and Singaporean shopping reward programme by DFI Retail

== See also ==
- You (disambiguation)
- Yu (disambiguation)
