= Yew (disambiguation) =

Yew is a common name for various coniferous trees, mostly in the genus Taxus.

Yew or Yews may also refer to:

== People ==
- John Fong Yew (born 1932), Trinidad and Tobago sports shooter
- Tan Kok Yew, Malaysian politician
- Lee Kuan Yew (1923–2015), founding father of Singapore and first prime minister
- Lee Kim Yew (born 1955), Malaysian entrepreneur, businessman and philanthropist
- Lim Chan Yew (born 1978), Malaysian footballer
- Lim Kok Yew, a perpetrator in the Tiong Bahru bus hijacking
- Sebastian Ting Chiew Yew, Malaysian lawyer and politician
- Si Yew Ming (born 1979), Malaysian tennis player
- Yew Tian Hoe, Malaysian politician
- Chay Weng Yew (1928–2004), Singaporean weightlifter
- Wong Yew Tong (born 1971), Singaporean athlete
- Phey Yew Kok (born 1934), former Singaporean politician
- Loh Kean Yew (born 1997), Singaporean badminton player

== Places ==
=== England ===
- Yew Tree (Liverpool ward), Liverpool
- Yew Tree Tarn, a Lakeland lake in Cumbria
- Yew Tree, West Bromwich, West Midlands
- Kenn Church, Kenn Pier & Yew Tree Farm SSSI, a geologic site in Somerset

=== Singapore ===
- Yew Tee, Choa Chu Kang New Town
- Yew Tee MRT station, Choa Chu Kang
- Yew Lian Park, Bishan

=== United States ===
- Yew Mountains, West Virginia

=== Fictional ===
- Yew alley, a fictional walkway in Dartmoor in The Hound of the Baskervilles
- Yew Dales, the mythical home of Norse winter god Ull

== Other uses ==
- Yokogawa Electric Works (YEW)
- Yew (Armenian letter)
- Yews, a news website created by Yeezy

== See also ==
- You (disambiguation)
- Yew Tree (disambiguation)
- Ewe (disambiguation)
