= Yew Tee (disambiguation) =

Yew Tee is a residential area in the West Region of Singapore.

Yew Tee may also refer to:

- Yew Tee MRT station, an Mass Rapid Transit (MRT) station in Choa Chu Kang, Singapore

== See also ==
- Marsiling–Yew Tee Group Representation Constituency
- Yew Tree (disambiguation)
- Youdi
