= Alfred de Glehn =

Alfred George de Glehn (15 September 1848 – 8 June 1936) was a notable English-born French designer of steam locomotives and an engineer with the Société Alsacienne de Constructions Mécaniques (SACM). His steam engines of the 1890s combined elegance, high speed, and efficiency. De Glehn's express locomotives were first used on the Nord Railway and on the boat trains from Calais to Paris, where they impressed passengers with their speed.

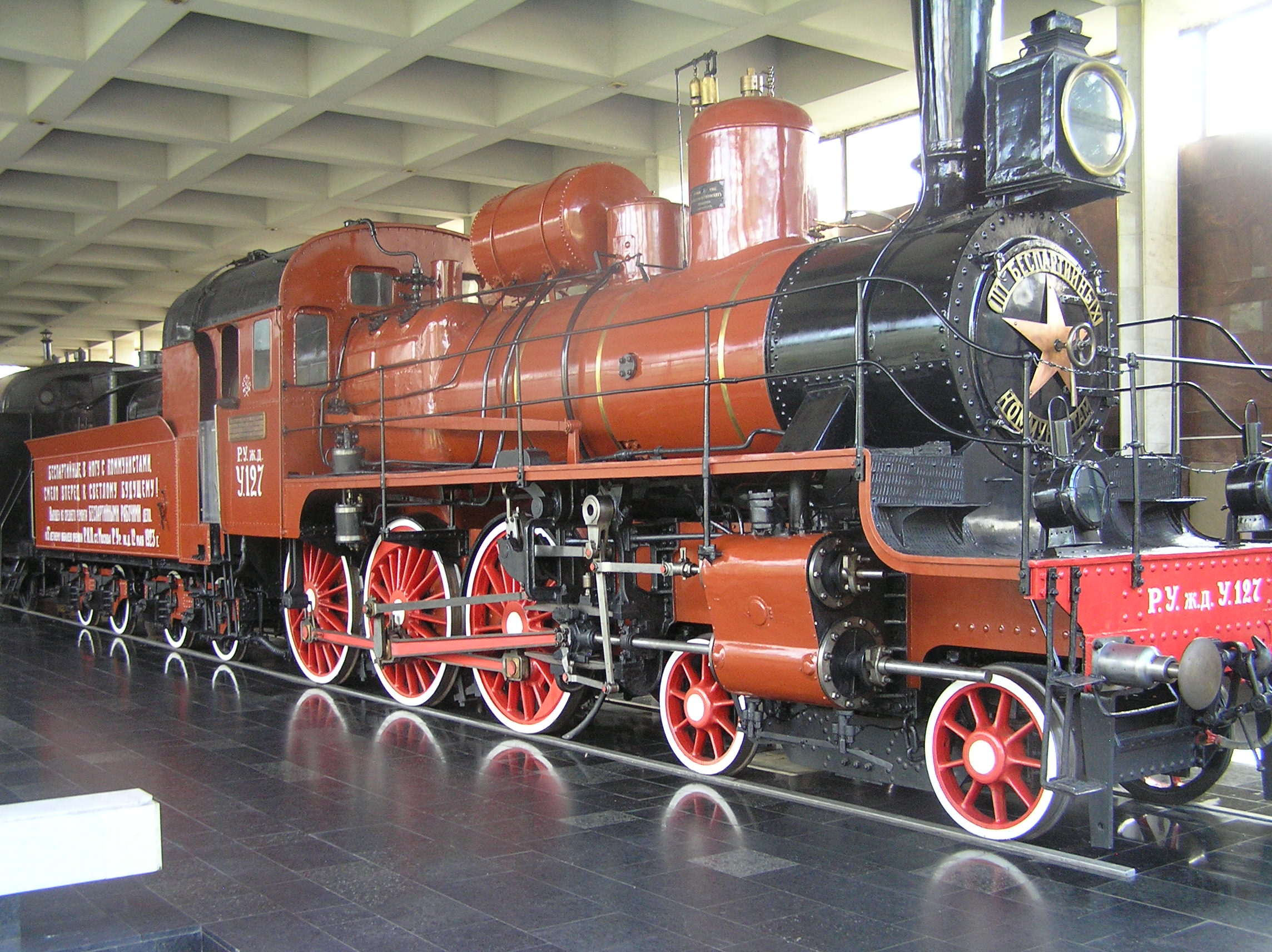
Locomotive U-127 Lenin's Locomotive (a 4-6-0 De Glehn Compound locomotive) at the Museum of the Moscow Railway, Paveletsky Rail Terminal

He invented the Glehn system of compounding, and De Glehn types were built in large numbers in France, and were also built in smaller numbers in Belgium, Germany, New Zealand, and Russia, see Compound locomotive. Compounding lost favour from the 1900s, being replaced by superheating. However André Chapelon rebuilt many of the French De Glehn compounds from 1929 onwards.

== Personal life ==
Alfred De Glehn was one of the twelve children of Robert von Glehn, a Prussian nobleman originally from the Baltic provinces, whose family had estates near Tallinn in Estonia, who had settled in England and married a Scotswoman. Their house in Sydenham, London, was a meeting place of artistic, literary and musical people, including George Grove, Arthur Sullivan, Jenny Lind, and J. R. Green.

Louise Creighton, an author and activist, was one of De Glehn's sisters. One of his brothers, Alexander von Glehn, was a coffee-merchant and built narrow-gauge railways in France. Alexander was the treasurer of the Protestant Evangelical Society of Relief in Paris which provided help to victims of the Franco-Prussian War, and Alexander’s son Wilfrid de Glehn was a British painter.

Alfred De Glehn changed the nobiliary particle in his name from "von" to "de" when he settled in France. Other members of the family remaining in England followed his example about 1917, during the First World War, when Britain was at war with Germany.

De Glehn died at his home at Mulhouse in Alsace at the age of 88. His house had been commandeered as the German district headquarters during the war.

== See also ==
- de Glehn compound locomotives
