= Death and state funeral of Vladimir Lenin =

1924 death and funeral of the Soviet Union's first leader

Lenin's funeral
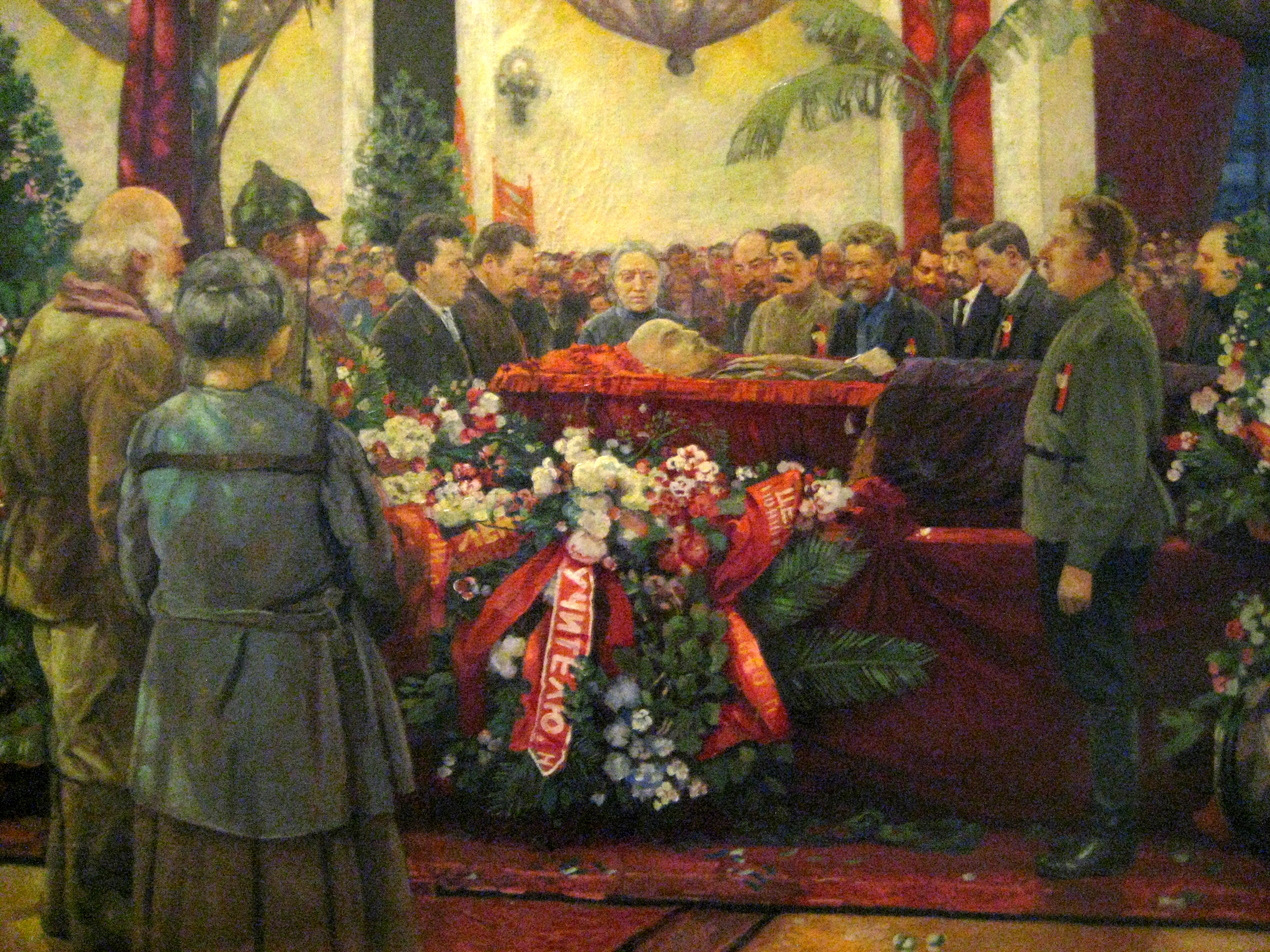
- Lenin's funeral (1925), by Isaak Brodsky (detail)
- Date: 27 January 1924; 102 years ago
- Location: Red Square, Moscow, Soviet Union
- Participants: RCP(b) leaders, relatives and followers.

On Monday, 21 January 1924, at 18:50 EET, Vladimir Lenin, leader of the October Revolution and the first leader and founder of the Soviet Union, died in Gorki aged 53 after falling into a coma. The official cause of death was recorded as an incurable disease of the blood vessels. Lenin was given a state funeral and then buried in a specially erected mausoleum on 27 January. A commission of the Central Committee of the RCP(b) was in charge of organising the funeral.

== Funeral service ==
External videos
- A fragment of newsreel footage of Lenin's funeral from the Russian State Archives

On 23 January, the coffin with Lenin's body was transported by train from Gorki to Moscow and displayed at the Hall of Columns in the House of the Unions, and it stayed there for three days. On 27 January, the body of Lenin was delivered to Red Square, accompanied by martial music. There assembled crowds listened to a series of speeches delivered by Mikhail Kalinin, Grigory Zinoviev, and Joseph Stalin, but notably not Leon Trotsky, who had been convalescing in the Caucasus. Trotsky would later claim that he had been given the wrong date for the funeral. Stalin's secretary, Boris Bazhanov would later corroborate this account as he stated "Stalin was true to himself: he sent a telegram to Trotsky, who was in the Caucasus undergoing medical treatment, giving a false date for Lenin's funeral". French historian Pierre Broue also cited the Moscow archives which documented written correspondence between Stalin and the secretary of the Abkhazian party, Nestor Lakoba, as evidence of Stalin's efforts to keep Trotsky in Sukhumi during Lenin's funeral. Trotsky would also deliver a tribute to Lenin with his 1925 short book, "Lenin".

Alexei Rykov was also absent from the funeral as he had gone to Italy with his wife and had experienced influenza. Afterwards the body was placed into the vault of a temporary wooden mausoleum (soon to be replaced with present-day Lenin's Mausoleum), by the Kremlin Wall. Despite the freezing temperatures, tens of thousands attended.

Against the protestations of Nadezhda Krupskaya, Lenin's widow, Lenin's body was embalmed to preserve it for long-term public display in the Red Square mausoleum. The commander of the Moscow Garrison issued an order to place the guard of honour at the mausoleum, whereby it was colloquially referred to as the "Number One Sentry". During the embalming process, Lenin's brain had been removed; in 1925, an institute was established to dissect it, revealing that Lenin had had severe sclerosis.

According to Bazhanov, Stalin was jubilant over Lenin's death while "publicly putting on the mask of grief". Similarly, Old Bolshevik Grigory Sokolnikov reported Stalin making disparaging remarks about Lenin's passing with the words that he "couldn't die like a real leader!".

== Post-Soviet period ==
After the events of the 1993 Russian constitutional crisis, the guard of honour was disbanded. In 2018, Russian MP Vladimir Petrov suggested that Lenin's body be buried in 2024, the 100th anniversary of his death, because it was costing the state too much money to house the body in the mausoleum and proposed it be replaced with a wax or rubber model. However, this did not take place.

== Gallery ==
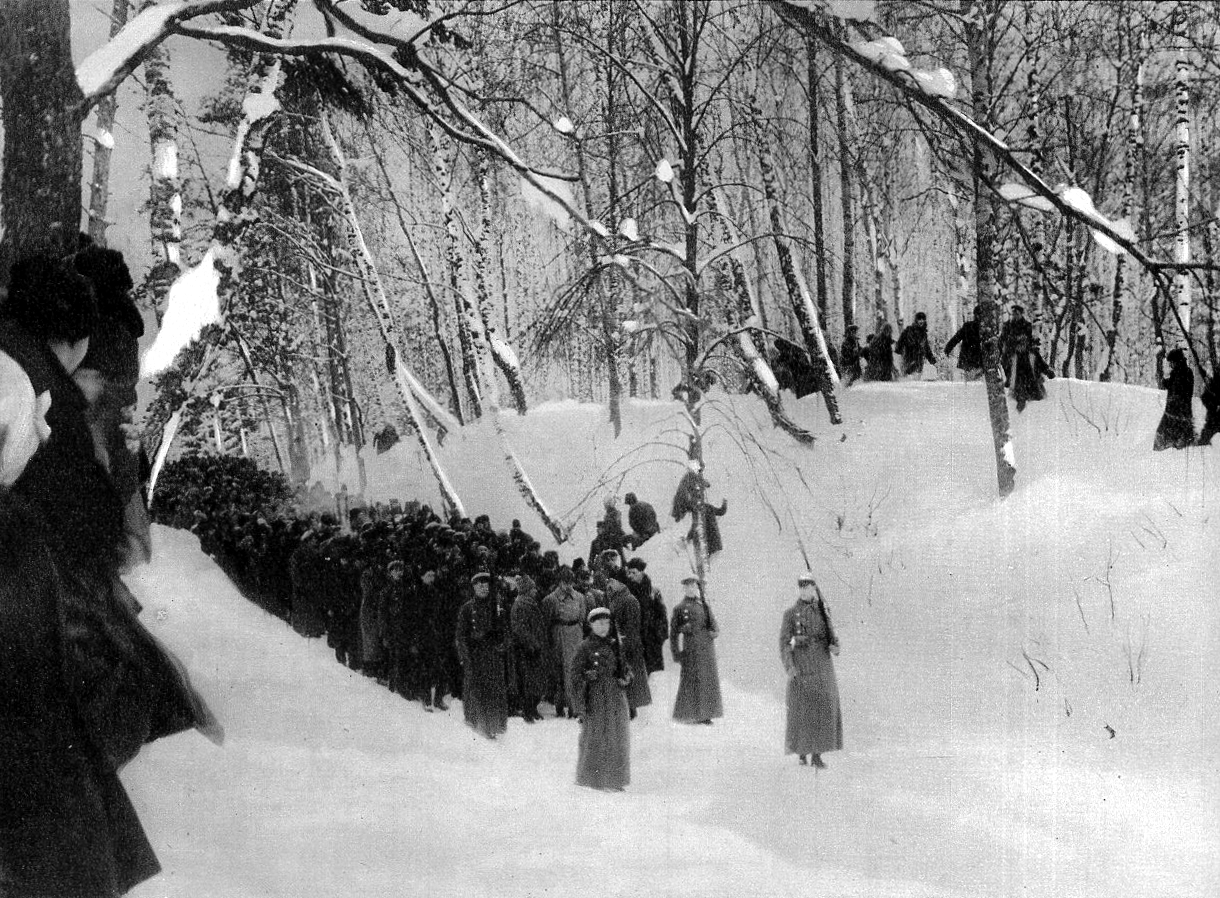
Transport of Lenin's body to the Gorki railway station.

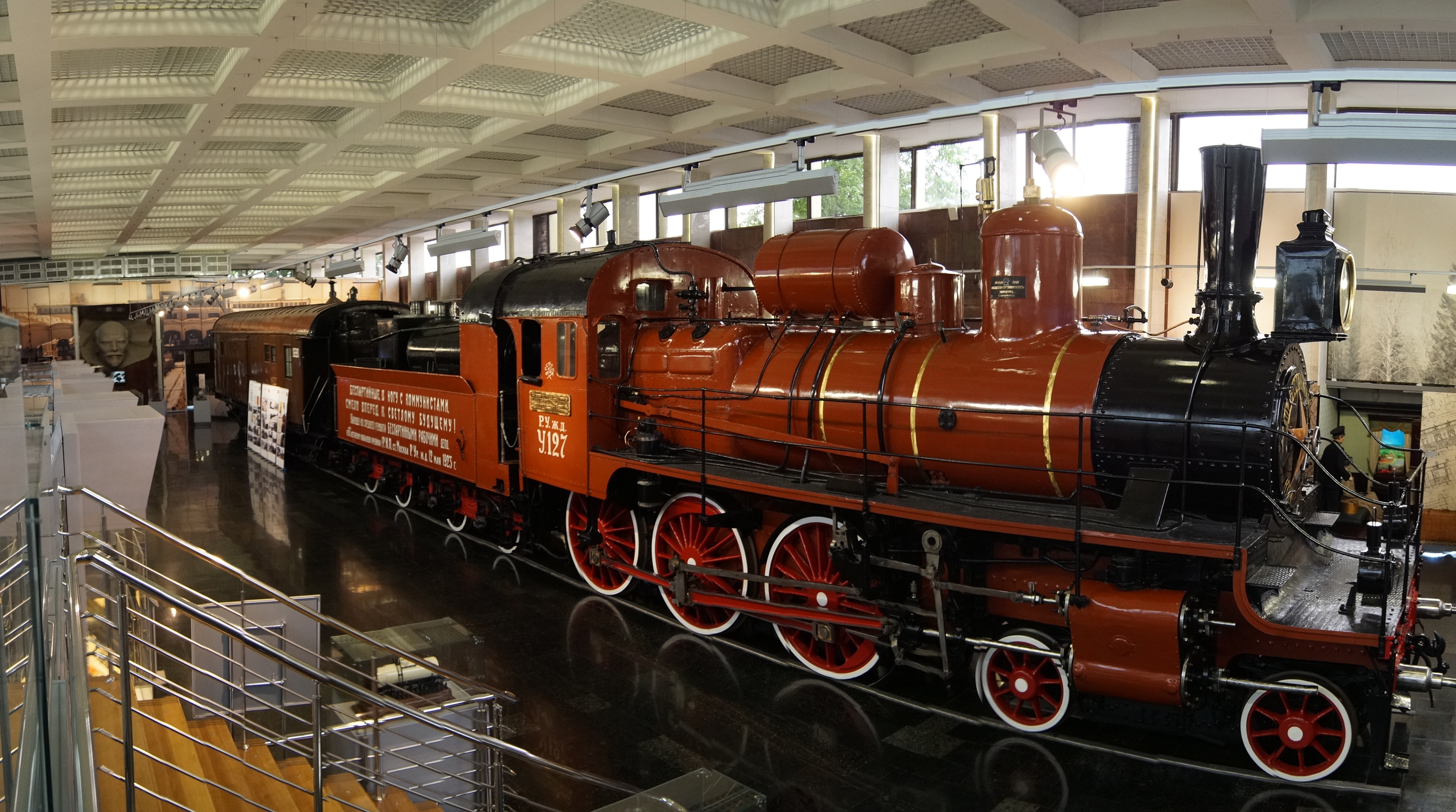
Train that carried Lenin's body from Gorki to Moscow (with Locomotive U-127).

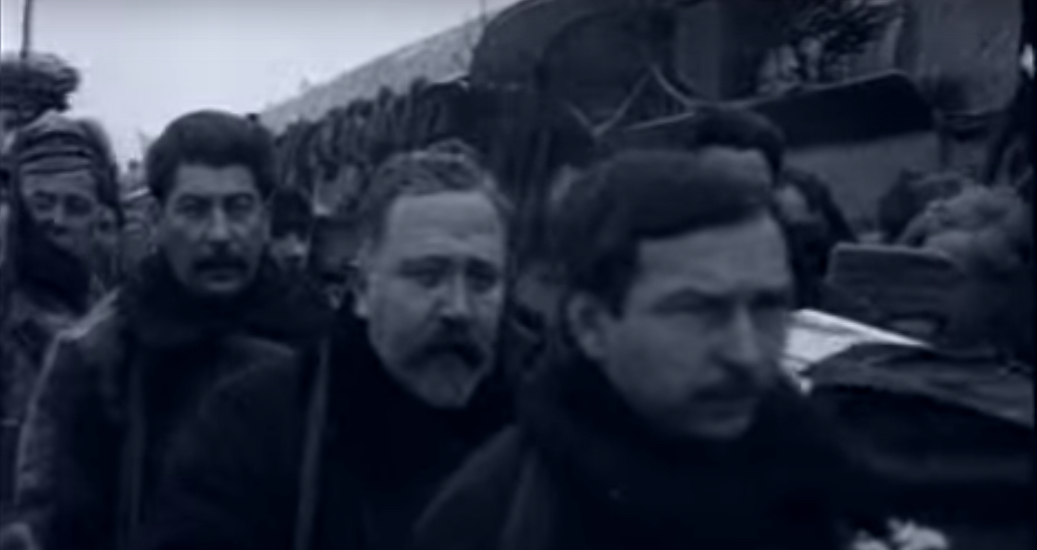
Joseph Stalin, Lev Kamenev and Mikhail Tomsky carrying Lenin's coffin.

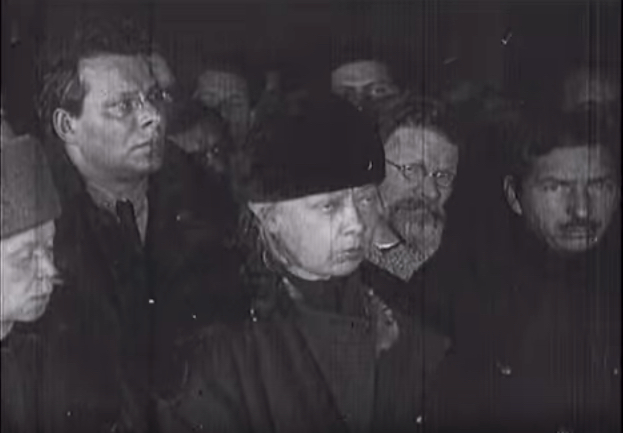
Mikhail Tomsky, Mikhail Kalinin, Nadezhda Krupskaya and Jānis Rudzutaks at Lenin's funeral.

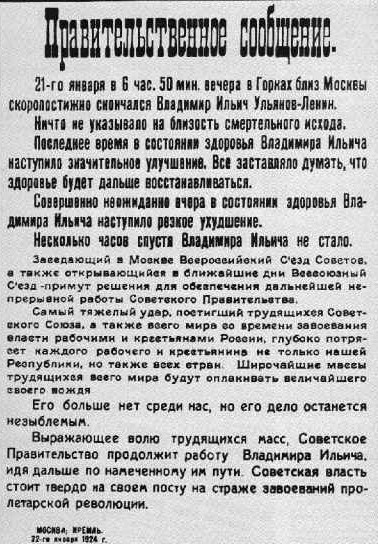
The information poster about Lenin's death, dated 22 January 1924.

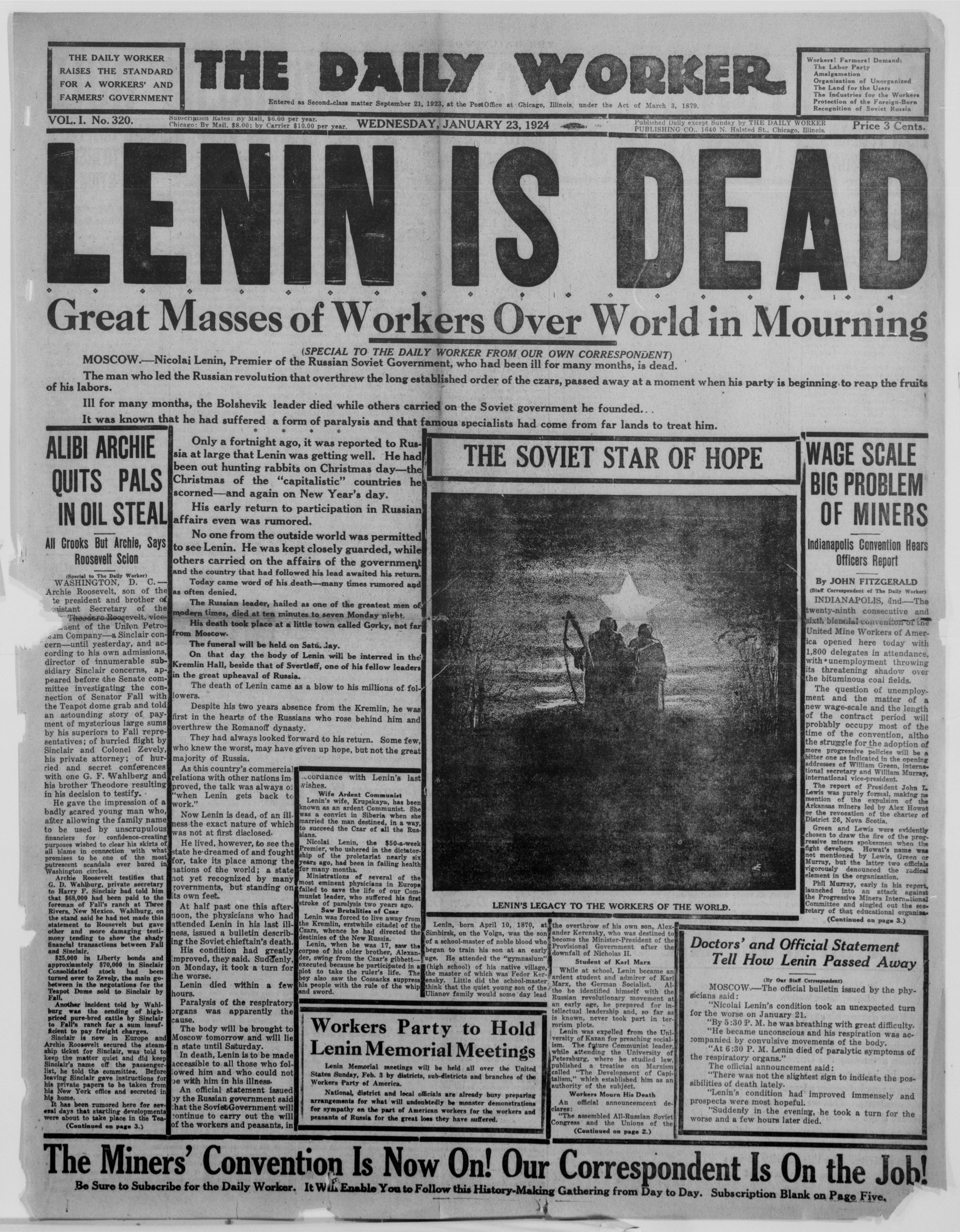
Daily Worker announcement of Lenin's death, 23 January 1924

== See also ==
- Death and state funeral of Joseph Stalin
- Lenin's Mausoleum
- Lenin's Testament
