= YUO =

YUO may refer to:

- ISO code for Yubanakor dialect of Kwanga language
- ISO 4217 currency code for Yugoslav dinar in Serbia and Montenegro in 1993

== See also ==
- You (disambiguation)
