= U of D =

U of D may refer to:

in the Republic of Ireland

- University of Dublin

in the United States

- University of Dallas, a Catholic university in Texas
- University of Dayton, a university in Ohio
- University of Delaware
- University of Detroit Jesuit High School and Academy, a Catholic secondary school in Michigan
- University of Detroit Mercy, a Catholic university in Michigan

in India

- University of Delhi

== See also ==
- UD (disambiguation)
