= You FM =

You FM refers to:

- You FM (Germany)
- You FM (Greece)
- You FM (Sri Lanka)
