= U class =

U class or Class U may refer to:

- British U-class submarine, submarines built just before and during World War II
- U-class destroyer, destroyers of the Royal Navy launched in 1942–1943
- SR U class, 2-6-0 steam locomotives built for the Southern Railway
- GNRI Class U, 4-4-0 steam locomotives built for the Great Northern Railway, Ireland
- NER Class U, 0-6-2 steam locomotives built for the North Eastern Railway
- NZR U class, 4-6-0 steam locomotives built for New Zealand Railways
- Russian locomotive class U, 4-6-0 steam locomotives
- South African Class U 2-6-2+2-6-2, steam locomotives
- South Australian Railways U class, 2-6-0 steam locomotives
- WAGR U class, 4-6-2 steam locomotives
- WAGR U class (1903), 0-6-0 tank locomotive
- Class U special wagon, railway goods wagons
- U-class Melbourne tram

== See also ==
- UCLASS
- SR U1 class
- U and non-U English
