= The U =

"The U" is a nickname often given to a university. Specifically, it has been used to refer to:

- The University of Miami in Coral Gables, Florida
  - Miami Hurricanes, the University of Miami's athletic program and teams
- The U (film), a 2009 documentary about the University of Miami football team
- The University of Utah in Salt Lake City, Utah

== Other uses ==
- WCIU-TV, a television station that currently carries "The U" branding;
- WMEU-CD, a television station that was formerly branded as "The U".

== See also ==
- U
- U (disambiguation)
