= Russian locomotive class U =

Russian locomotive class У [U]
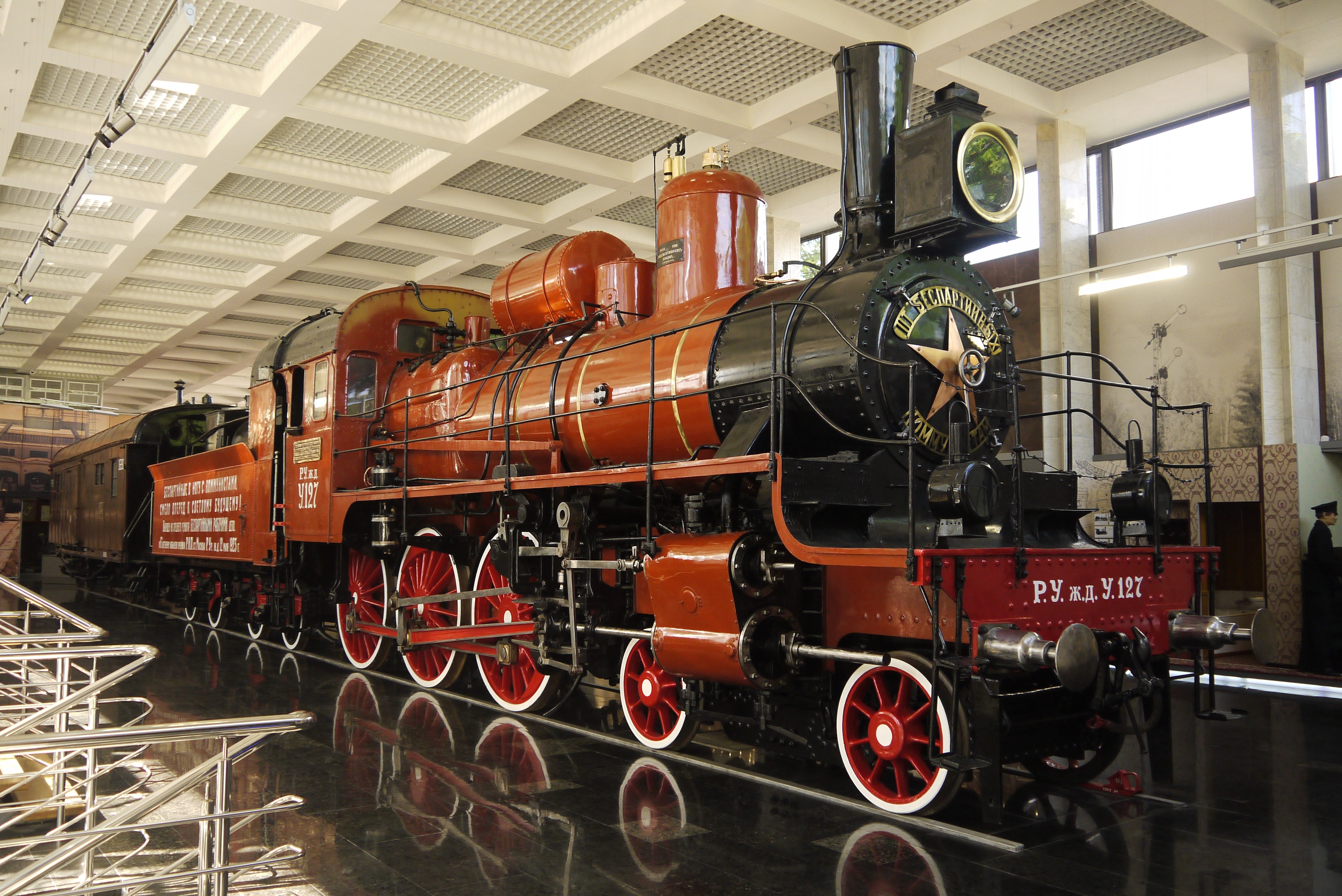
- Russian locomotive class U, number 127 (preserved)
Type and origin
- Power type: Steam
- Builder: Putilov factory
- Build date: 1906–1912
- Total produced: 62
Specifications
- Configuration
  - Whyte: 4-6-0
  - UIC: 2'C n4v
- Gauge: 1,524 mm (5 ft)
- Leading dia.: 950 mm (3 ft 1 3/8 in)
- Driver dia.: 1,730 mm (5 ft 8 1/8 in)
- Length: U: 11.032 m (36 ft 2 1/4 in); Uu: 11.369 m (37 ft 3.6 in)
- Height: 5,080 mm (16 ft 8 in)
- Axle load: 15.2 tonnes (15.0 long tons; 16.8 short tons)
- Adhesive weight: U: 45.4 tonnes (44.7 long tons; 50.0 short tons); Uu: 48.9 tonnes (48.1 long tons; 53.9 short tons)
- Loco weight: U: 72.1 tonnes (71.0 long tons; 79.5 short tons); Uu: 76.1 tonnes (74.9 long tons; 83.9 short tons)
- Fuel type: Fuel oil or coal
- Firebox
  - Grate area: 2.72 m^{2} (29.3 sq ft)
- Boiler pressure: 14.0 kg/cm^{2} (1.37 MPa; 199 psi)
- Heating surface: U: 182 m^{2} (1,960 sq ft); Uu: 151.9 m^{2} (1,635 sq ft)
- Cylinders: Four, compound
- High-pressure cylinder: U: 370 mm × 650 mm (14 9/16 in × 25 9/16 in); Uu: 410 mm × 650 mm (16 1/8 in × 25 9/16 in)
- Low-pressure cylinder: 580 mm × 650 mm (22 13/16 in × 25 9/16 in)
Performance figures
- Maximum speed: 115 km/h (71 mph)
Career
- Disposition: U-127 preserved at the Museum of the Moscow Railway

The Russian locomotive class U (Russian: У) was a Russian express passenger steam locomotive type. The class U was a 4-6-0 four-cylinder compound locomotive which used de Glehn compound system.

One unit, Locomotive U-127 was preserved as part of a memorial to Vladimir Lenin, at the Museum of the Moscow Railway

== Design development ==
Steam locomotives with the wheel arrangement 4-6-0 were widely used on the Russian railways in the late 19th and early 20th century. A rigid base formed by three driving axles ensured a smooth ride on straight tracks without much sideways movement, and а two-axial steering bogie meant good performance on curve tracks. 4-6-0 locomotives of most popular Russian class А were being used among others on the Ryazan-Urals Railway and covered Russia's passenger transportation needs until 1901, when the necessity to build a more powerful locomotive class emerged.

A weak track structure with a light load carrying capacity limited the axle load. Operational experience with two-cylinder engines showed that they had a poor starting ability, accelerated comparatively slowly and had a rough ride. So the Head of the Ryazan-Ural Railway Hauling Service engineer A.E. Delacroix decided to use a technical design specification for a locomotive of type 4-6-0 equipped with a four compounding cylinders.

In July 1903 the Engineering Board of the Ministry of Communications approved a new locomotive design elaborated at the Putilov factory (later Kirov Plant) in Saint Petersburg under the supervision of the engineer M.V. Gololobov. The design included de Glehn compound system, which at that time was used on certain types of express passenger locomotives in Europe. In that system, high-pressure cylinders were mounted outside the frame and were connected with the second driving axle, while low-pressure cylinders were connected with the crank axle of the first driving axle. The firebox was designed for the use of oil as fuel and it had a small firedoor hole. There was no steam superheater.

At the end of 1906 the first locomotive of this type was built at the Putilov factory. After being tested in March 1907 it was sent to the Ryazan-Ural railway, where it was classified as P1 (Russian: П1).

The first pair of driving wheels had no flanges. The internal elbows of the driving axle were placed opposite the external cranks which made it possible to decrease the size of counterweights and to obtain a good balance between the locomotive engine and the locomotive underframe. As a result, the locomotive was a smooth runner at high speed (115 km/hour).

== History of Class U and Uu ==
56 class U locomotives were built between 1906 and 1910 at the Putilov factory. Not only Ryazan-Ural but Nikolaevskaya, Tashkentskaya (Tashkent), South-Western, and Privislinskaya (Near-Vistula) Railways all placed orders for this type of locomotive in amounts of 8, 20, 8, 5 and 15 respectively. But shortly after Nikolaev and Privislinskaya Railways gave their locomotives to Tashkentskaya Railway. In 1912 these locomotives were classified as series “У” (transliteration: U), for Ryazan-Ural railway design.

The locomotive was tested in 1910 and it was established that this type of locomotive had the most economical performance running at the speed of approximately 90 km/hour and hauling light trains. However, the capacity of the boiler was estimated as insufficient. In 1911 according to the results of the locomotive testing the Putilov factory made a few significant alterations to the design: greater surface area as well as the diameter of the boiler shell, the high-pressure cylinders were enlarged, and a superheater was mounted. This had a heating surface of 39 m^{2} (420 sq ft). In 1912 the factory built 6 further locomotives with these improved characteristics for Ryazan-Ural Railway, and they were classified as У^{у} (transliteration: U^{u}). In total, 62 locomotives of U class and its variants were built.

Initially, the Ryazan-Ural Railway locomotives received P1, P2 and P3 built in 1906 and later locomotives P4, P5, P6, P7, and P8 built in 1907. In 1912, the railway received locomotives P9 to P14. After 1912 they all were redesignated to U-1 - U-8 and U^{u}-9 - U^{u}-14.

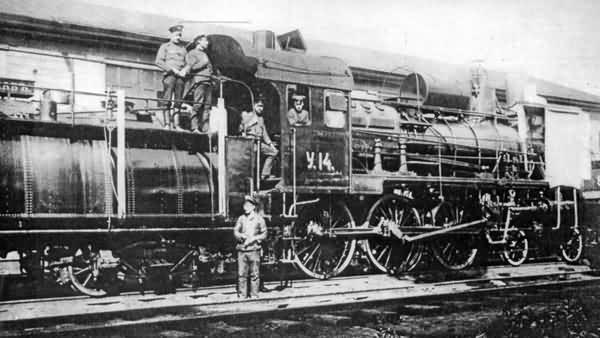
Locomotive Uu-14 on the Ryazan-Ural Railway in 1910s, with rounded oil tender

The steam locomotives of class U and U^{u} on the Ryazan-Ural railway were equipped with distinctive four-axle semicircular tenders for 23 m^{3} of water and 8.2 t of oil, that were designed specifically for them at the request of the railway. The class U locomotives that worked on other railways had the normal 3 or 4 axle rectangular tenders with water tanks and coal box. Later some locomotives were modernized and equipped superheaters. These locomotives have received the designation “U^{ch}” (Russian: У^{Ч}).

The locomotives worked on the Moscow section of the Moscow-Donbas railway until 1936, when they began to be replaced by new, more powerful locomotives. The Class U from the Moscow-Donbas locomotives were transferred to the Caucasus-Ordzhonikidze railway, and in 1939 they were again transferred to industrial railways. For these duties, high-speed express locomotives were poorly suited, which precipitated their withdrawal. By the beginning of 1940 in the inventory listed 47 class U locomotives. The last locomotives were withdrawn in 1952.

== Preservation ==
One example of a class U locomotive class is preserved, U-127 at The Museum of the Moscow Railway.

== See also ==
- History of rail transport in Russia
- Russian Railway Museum, Saint Petersburg
