= You (song) =

Songs titled "You" include:

- "You" (Ayumi Hamasaki song), 1998
- "You" (Benny Blanco, Marshmello and Vance Joy song), 2021
- "You" (Candlebox song), 1993
- "You" (Chris Young song), 2011
- "You" (Earth, Wind & Fire song), 1980
- "You" (Galantis song), 2013
- "You" (George Harrison song), 1975
- "You" (James Arthur song), 2019
- "You" (Janet Jackson song), 1998
- "You" (Jesse Powell song), 1999
- "You" (Kaela Kimura song), 2006
- "You" (Keyshia Cole song), 2017
- "You" (Koda Kumi song), 2005
- "You" (La Cream song), 1998
- "You" (Lloyd song), 2006
- "You" (Lola Brooke song), 2023
- "You" (Marcia Hines song), 1977; written and first recorded by Tom Snow (1975), covered by Rita Coolidge (1978)
- "You" (Marvin Gaye song), 1968
- "You" (Nathaniel Willemse song), 2013
- "You" (Pandora song), 2003
- "You" (Queensrÿche song), 1997
- "You" (Regard, Troye Sivan and Tate McRae song), 2021
- "You" (Robin Stjernberg song), the Sweden entry in the Eurovision Song Contest 2013
- "You" (Romeo Santos song), 2011
- "You" (S Club 7 song), 2002
- "You" (Schiller and Colbie Caillat song), 2008
- "You" (Shaznay Lewis song), 2004
- "You" (Special D. song), 2004
- "You" (Staxx song), 1993
- "You" (Tarot song), 2006
- "You" (Ten Sharp song), 1991
- "You" (Vasil Garvanliev song), 2020
- "You" (Wes Carr song), 2008
- "You" (The Who song), 1981
- "You (Ha Ha Ha)", by Charli XCX, 2013
- "You", by the 1975 from Sex, 2012
- "You", by 2hollis from Star, 2025
- "You", by A Loss for Words, 2011
- "You", by Aespa from Drama, 2023
- "You", by the Afters from I Wish We All Could Win, 2005
- "You", by America from Holiday, 1974
- "You", by Anthem from Black Empire, 2008
- "You", by the Aquatones, 1958
- "You", by Avail from Front Porch Stories, 2002
- "You", by Bad Religion from No Control, 1989
- "You.", by Band-Maid from Just Bring It, 2017
- "You", by Basil Valdez, 1980
- "You", by Beartooth from Pure Ecstasy, 2026
- "You", by Bic Runga from Drive, 1995
- "You", by Bonnie Raitt from Longing in Their Hearts, 1994
- "You", by Breaking Benjamin from Phobia, 2006
- "You", by Brian McKnight from I Remember You, 1995
- "You", by the Carpenters from A Kind of Hush, 1976
- "You", by Chase Atlantic from Lost in Heaven, 2024
- "You", by Chris Brown from Exclusive, 2007
- "You", by Collective Soul from Collective Soul, 2009
- "You", by Delta 5 from Singles & Sessions 1979–1981, 2006
- "You", by Diana Ross from Last Time I Saw Him, 1973
- "You", by Don Toliver from Life of a Don, 2021
- "You", by Ed Sheeran from No. 5 Collaborations Project, 2011
- "You", by Elijah Woods x Jamie Fine, 2019
- "You", by The Featherz, 2015
- "You", by Five Finger Death Punch from The Wrong Side of Heaven and the Righteous Side of Hell, Volume 1, 2013
- "You", by Gold Panda from Lucky Shiner, 2010
- "You", by Gotthard from Open, 1998
- "Y.O.U.", by Grand Funk Railroad from Grand Funk Lives, 1981
- "You", by the Housemartins from London 0 Hull 4, 1986
- "You", by IU from Pieces, 2021
- "You", by Jacquees from 4275, 2018
- "You", by Janelle Monáe from The Audition, 2003
- "You", by Jermaine Dolly, single 2015, on the album Dolly Express, 2017
- "You", by Joanne from Do Not Disturb, 2001
- "You", by Jona Viray from Jona, 2017
- "You", by Kutless from To Know That You're Alive, 2008
- "You", by Lost Kings, 2015
- "You", by Lucy Pearl from Lucy Pearl, 2000
- "You", by Marina from Love + Fear, 2019
- "You", by Marshall Dyllon from Enjoy the Ride, 2000
- "You", by Miley Cyrus from Endless Summer Vacation, 2023
- "You", by Monifah from Moods...Moments, 1996
- "You", by Mustard Plug from Evildoers Beware!, 1997
- "You", by Ned's Atomic Dustbin from God Fodder, 1991
- "You", by Plies from The Real Testament, 2007
- "You", by Point Break from Apocadelic, 2000
- "You", by the Pretty Reckless from Light Me Up, 2010
- "You", by Radiohead from Pablo Honey, 1993
- "You", by Raheem DeVaughn from The Love Experience, 2005
- "You", by Randy Edelman, 1975, covered by Carpenters from A Kind of Hush, 1976
- "You", by R.E.M. from Monster, 1994
- "You", by Rich the Kid from Boss Man, 2020
- "You", by Sara Evans from certain editions of Born to Fly, 2000
- "You", by Sarina Paris from Sarina Paris, 2001
- "You", by Snoh Aalegra from Ugh, Those Feels Again, 2019
- "You", by the S.O.S. Band from Too, 1981
- "You", by Steve Martin from Rare Bird Alert, 2011
- "You", by Switchfoot from The Legend of Chin, 1997
- "You", by Tally Hall from Good & Evil, 2011
- "You", by T.I. from Dime Trap, 2018
- "You", by Tinashe from Songs for You, 2019
- "You", by Tony Banks from A Curious Feeling, 1979
- "You", by Xiumin, 2019
- "You", by Yoko Ono from Fly, 1971
- "You", by Yolanda Adams, 2009
- "You", by Lane 8 and Kasablanca, 2024
