= Yew Lian Park =

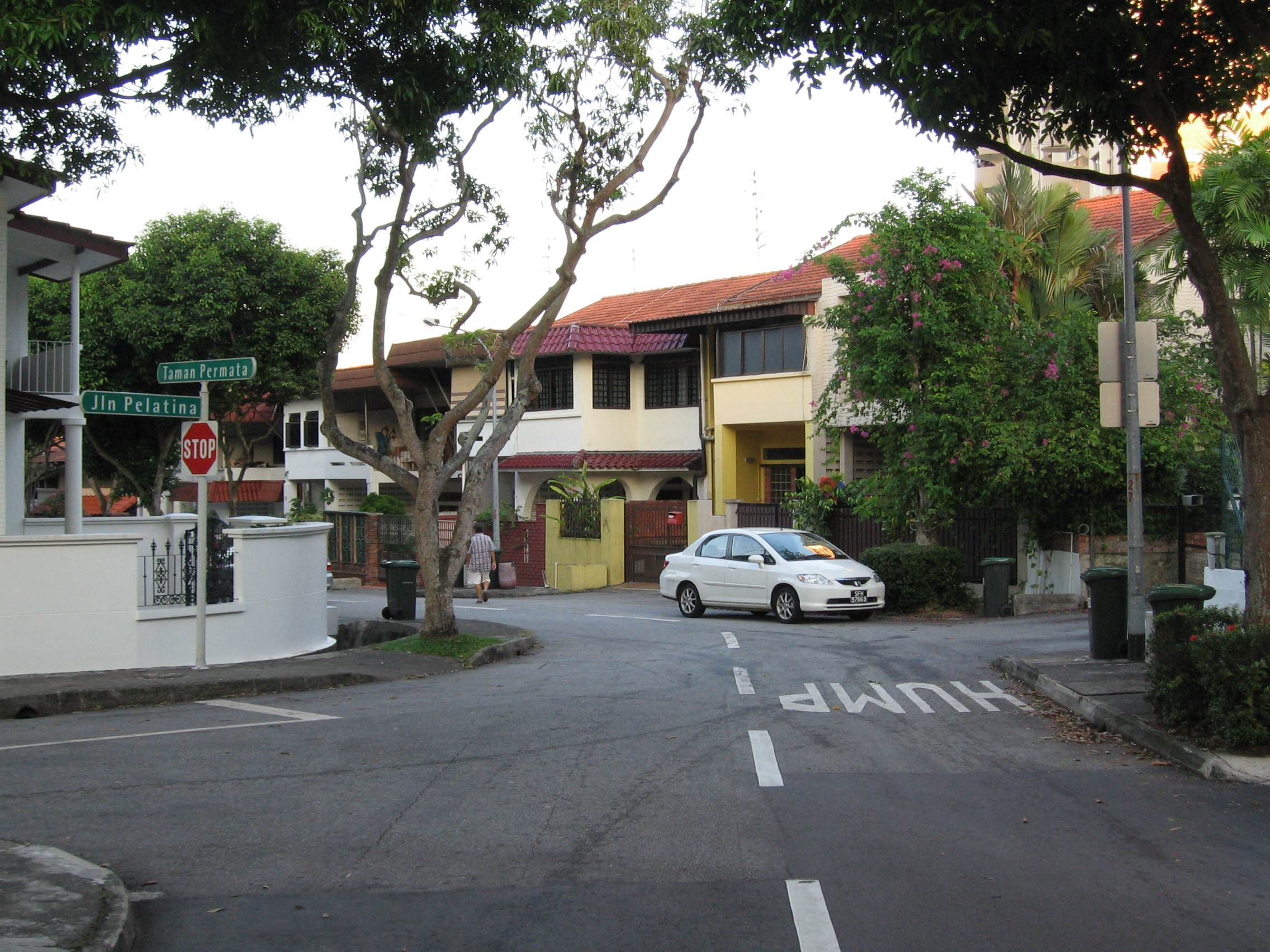
One view of Yew Lian Park.

Yew Lian Park (Chinese: 友联园; pinyin: Yǒuliányuán) is a private residential estate situated along Upper Thomson Road in Bishan, Singapore. The estate comprises semi-detached houses and terraced houses with two bungalows. The estate was named after the development company that built the estate in the early sixties, the Yew Lian Company. Completion of development was in 1966, but residents had started to move in from late 1964, when Phase 1 was completed.

The estate is bounded by Lakeview Private Housing Estate, the Central Catchment Area and Thomson Ridge Estate. There are only two roads in the estate, Jalan Pelatina and Taman Permata. Jalan Pelatina provides the only vehicular access to the estate, while Taman Permata loops around the whole estate.

== History ==
During the early days, the majority of owners were young families with young children. Many houses were rented to expatriate families who worked in the camps in Sembawang belonging to the British Services (Air Force, Army and Navy).

The original price of an intermediate terrace house was S$20,000, quite a princely sum during the sixties. Many buyers just paid the deposit of around $2,000 and rented out their houses to service the loan for the balance of $18,000. The rent could easily service the loan.

There was a sarabat stall (drink stall) on the pedestrian walkway just in front of where the Shell Station is now located. This sarabat stall was there until the full completion of building all the houses.

Upper Thomson Road in those days was a single lane traffic, both ways. Kampong San Teng was famous for its gangster activities. Tay Koh Yat buses used to serve the area.

Imperial Theatre stood where Imperial Court. The theatre was open-air with hard wooden seats. In the mornings the area was turned into a market where vegetables, meats and fruits were sold.

There were a few cemeteries around the estate, including a Cantonese Kampong San Teng Cemetery (around the present Raffles Institution) and a Hainanese Cemetery (the present Lake View Estate).

== Cross Island Line ==
The Cross Island line (CRL) was announced in 2013 and due to the initial plan of alignment cutting across the part of the Central Catchment Nature Reserve (CCNR) and MacRitchie Reservoir, 2 other possible alignments were planned. The second choice of alignment will go underneath Upper Thomson Road, affecting residential estates such as Windsor Park and Yew Lian Park.
