= You FM (Sri Lanka) =

Radio station in Sri Lanka

You FM is a Sri Lankan radio channel which broadcasts in Colombo and Kandy. It was launched on 10 September 2006 as MAX Radio. It is available on 95.3 FM islandwide. It is a Sinhala medium radio and operated by MGMR Network (Pvt) Ltd.
