= Locomotive U-127 =

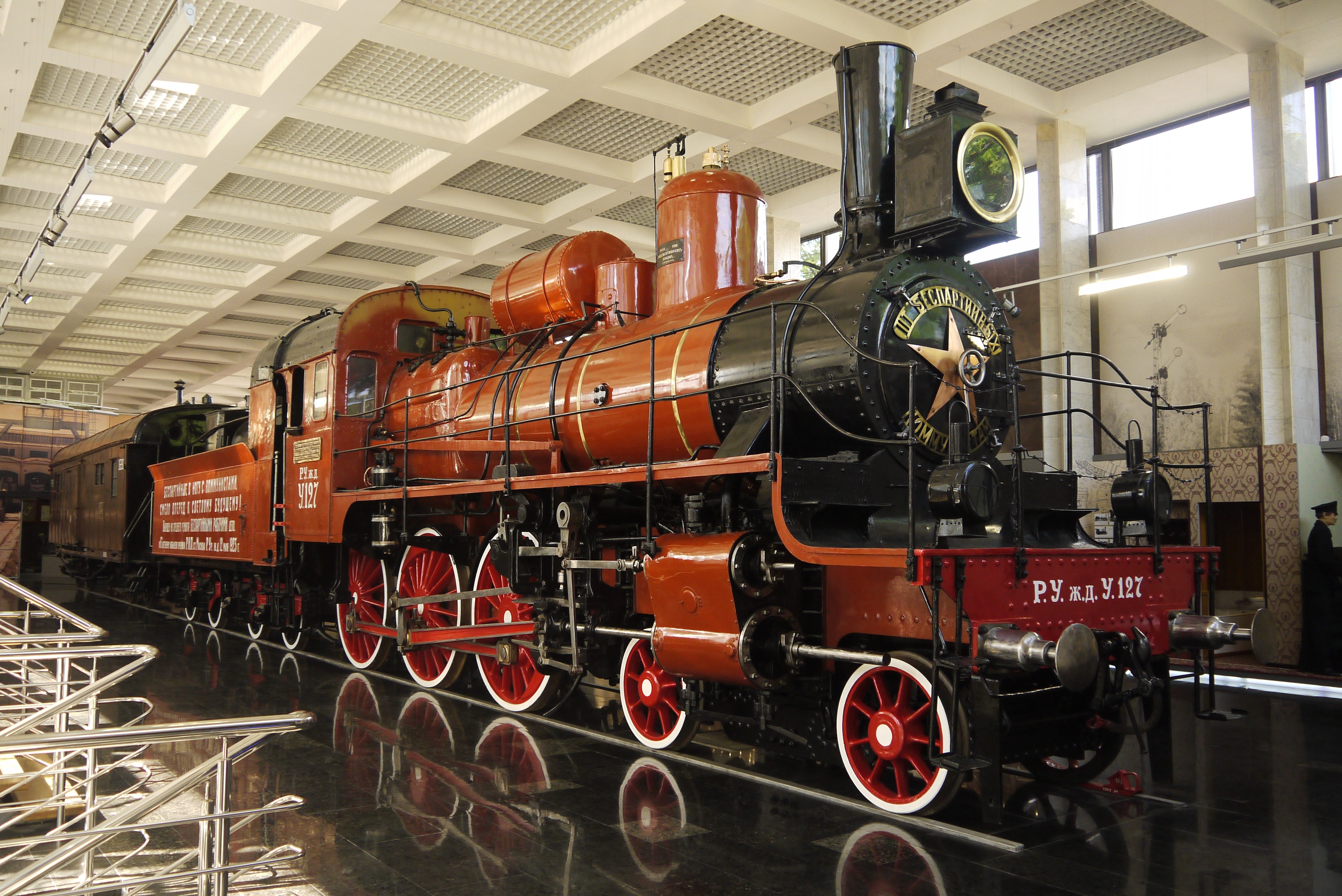
- Locomotive U-127 4-6-0
Type and origin
- Power type: Steam
- Builder: Putilov factory / Kirov Plant
- Order number: 1960
- Build date: 1910
Specifications
- Configuration
  - Whyte: 4-6-0
- Gauge: 1,524 mm (5 ft)
- Driver dia.: 1.73 metres (5 ft 8 in)
- Axle load: 15.2 tonnes (15.0 long tons; 16.8 short tons)
- Adhesive weight: 45.4 tonnes (44.7 long tons; 50.0 short tons)
- Loco weight: 72.1 tonnes (71.0 long tons; 79.5 short tons)
- Fuel type: Oil
- Firebox
  - Grate area: 272 m^{2} (2,930 sq ft)
- Boiler pressure: 14kg/cm2
- Heating surface: 182 m^{2} (1,960 sq ft)
- Cylinder size: 370mm / 580mm
Performance figures
- Maximum speed: 115 km/h (71 mph)
Career
- Numbers: 127
- Current owner: Museum of the Moscow Railway
- Disposition: static display

Russian steam locomotive U-127 is a 4-6-0 locomotive of type Russian locomotive class U, preserved at the Museum of the Moscow Railway next to Paveletsky Rail Terminal in Moscow. The locomotive was the first Russian steam locomotive preserved.

== Background and history ==
The Russian locomotive class U was a four-cylinder de Glehn compound locomotive, which first appeared in 1906. 62 class Us were built between 1906 and 1916 at the Putilov factory (later the Kirov Plant. By the beginning of 1940 the inventory still listed 47 class U locomotives. The last locomotives were withdrawn in 1952. U-127 is famous for being Vladimir Lenin's locomotive, hence its preservation. It was used to bring his body back to Moscow for his funeral. For this reason it has escaped the ravages of time and, much like Lenin himself, it was preserved in perfect condition. It has not moved since 1948.

U-127 was the Soviet Union's first and, until the 1980s, only preserved Russian locomotive. The only other preserved locomotive was Hk1 293 at Finland Station in Leningrad/St. Petersburg, which brought Lenin back from exile. However, Hk1 293 was built by Richmond Locomotive Works in the USA for the Finnish State Railways, and thus technically not a Russian locomotive. U-127 was built in 1910 with builder's number 1960, and was destined for the Tashkent railway.

=== Gallery ===
Locomotive U-127 and funeral train exhibit at the Museum of the Moscow Railway
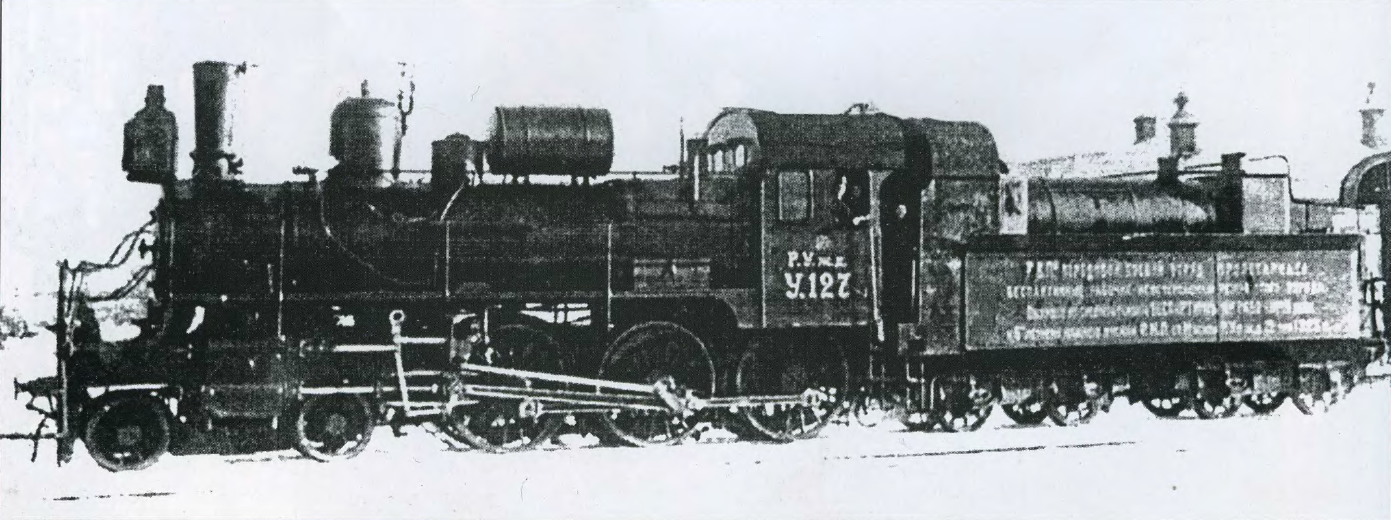
U-127 in 1923 after repair

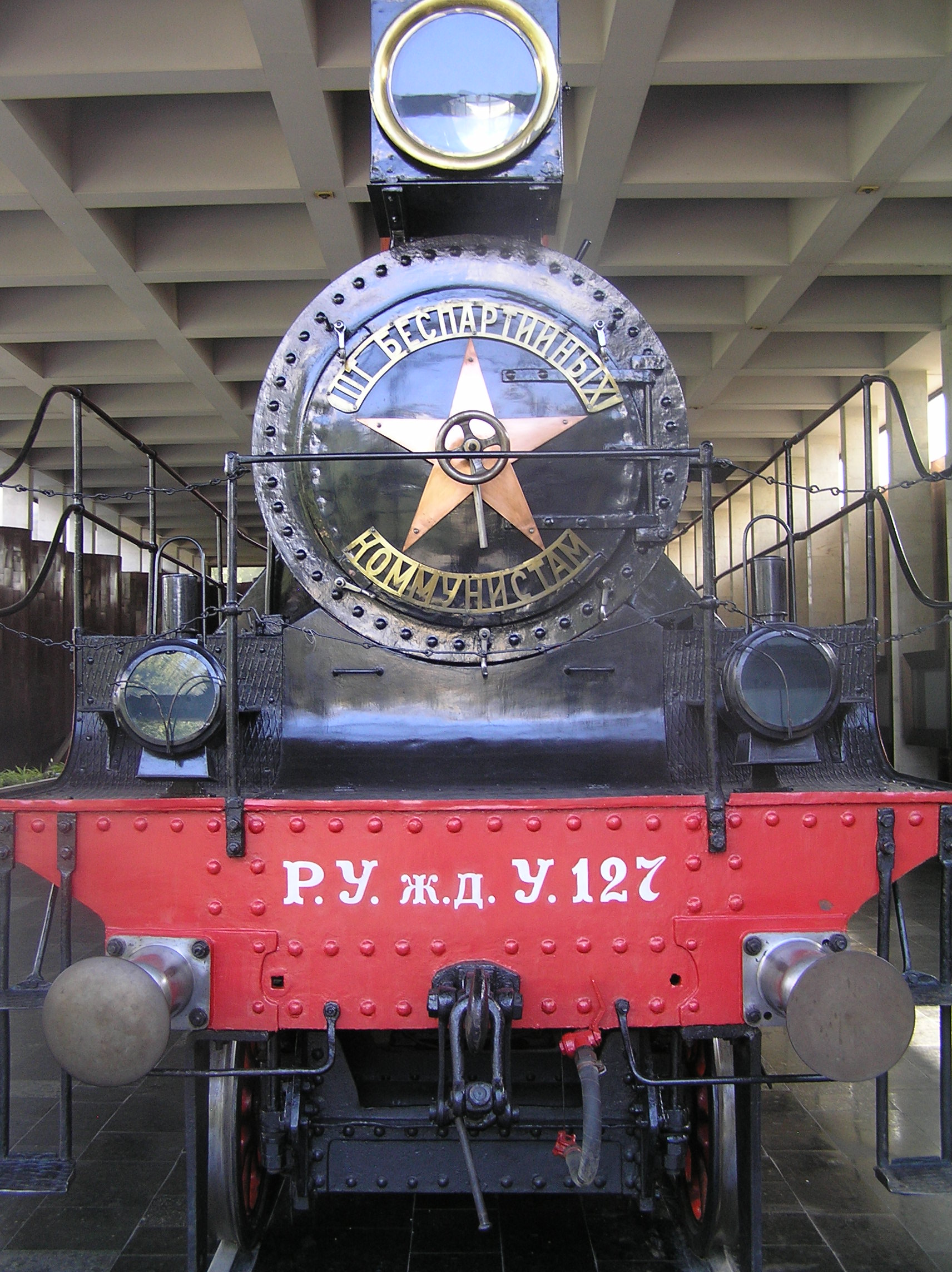

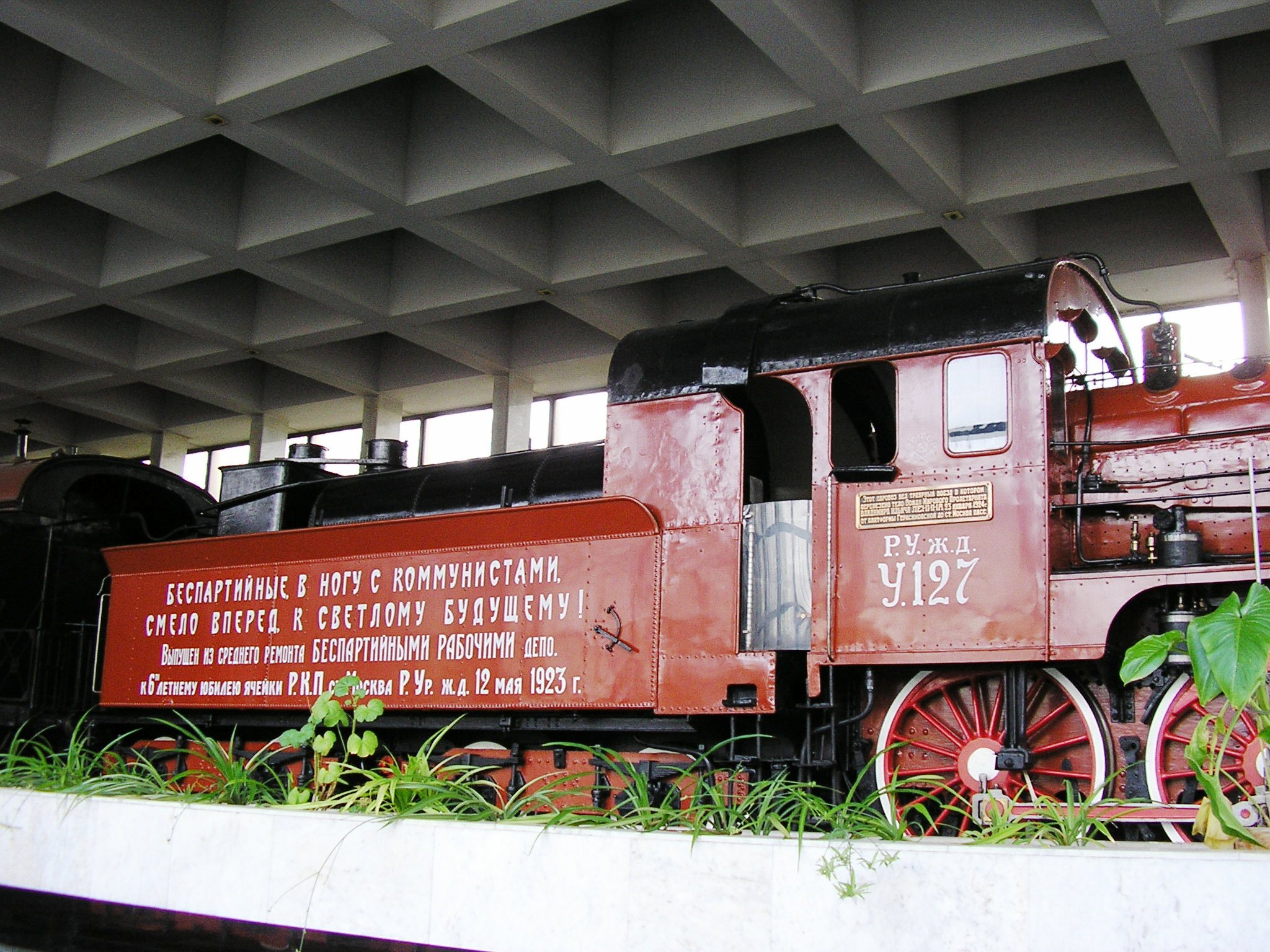

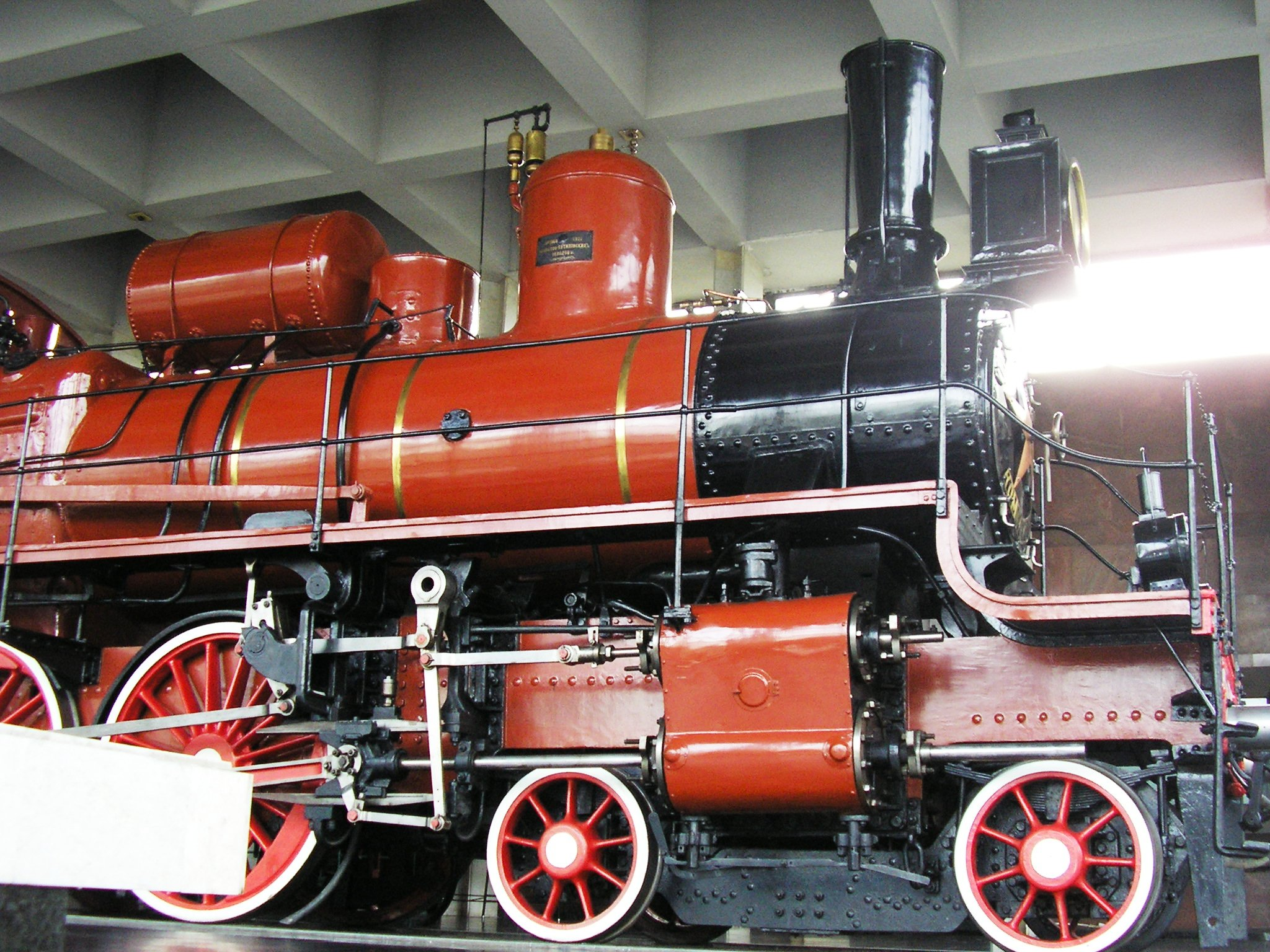

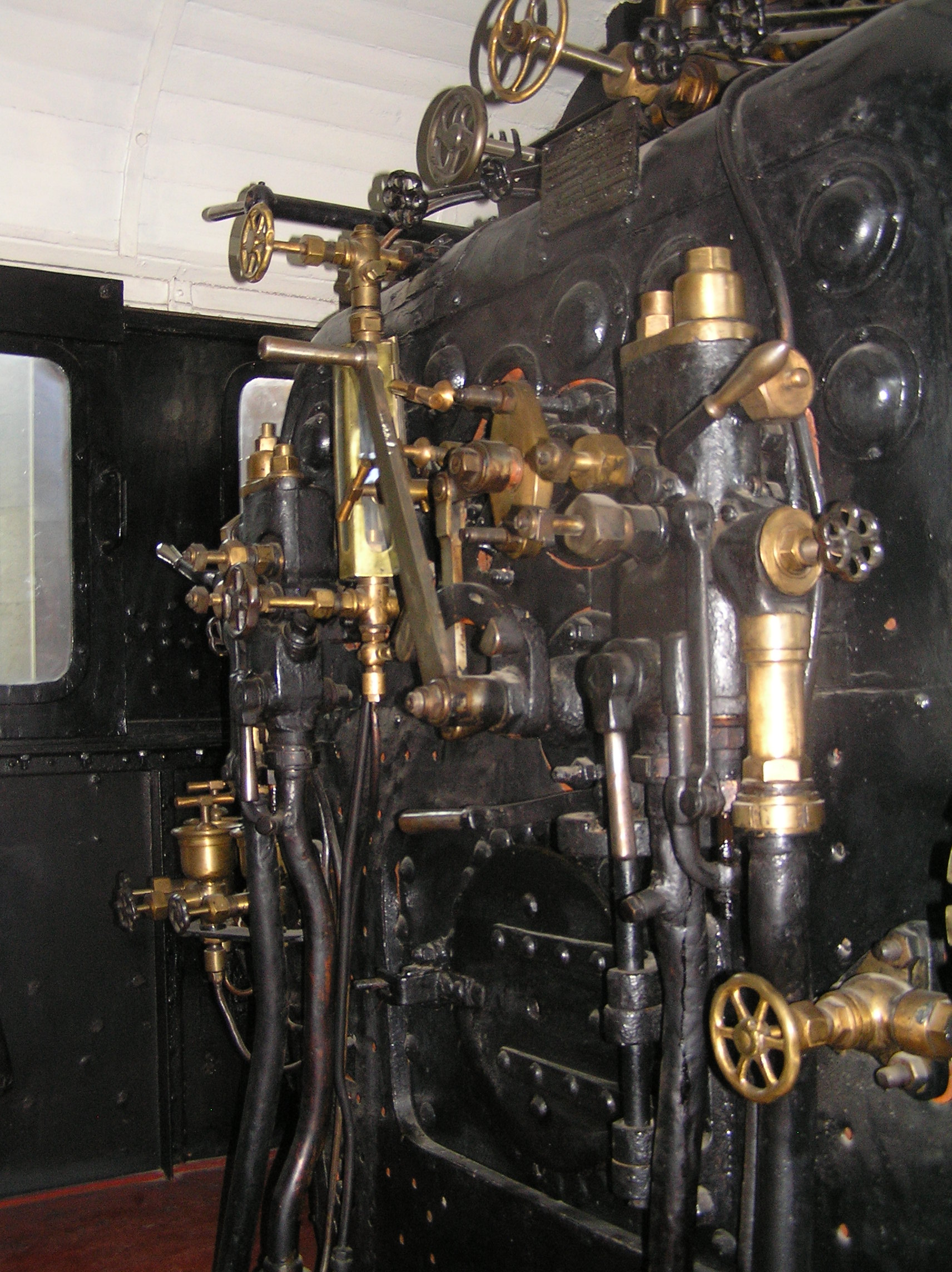
Cab

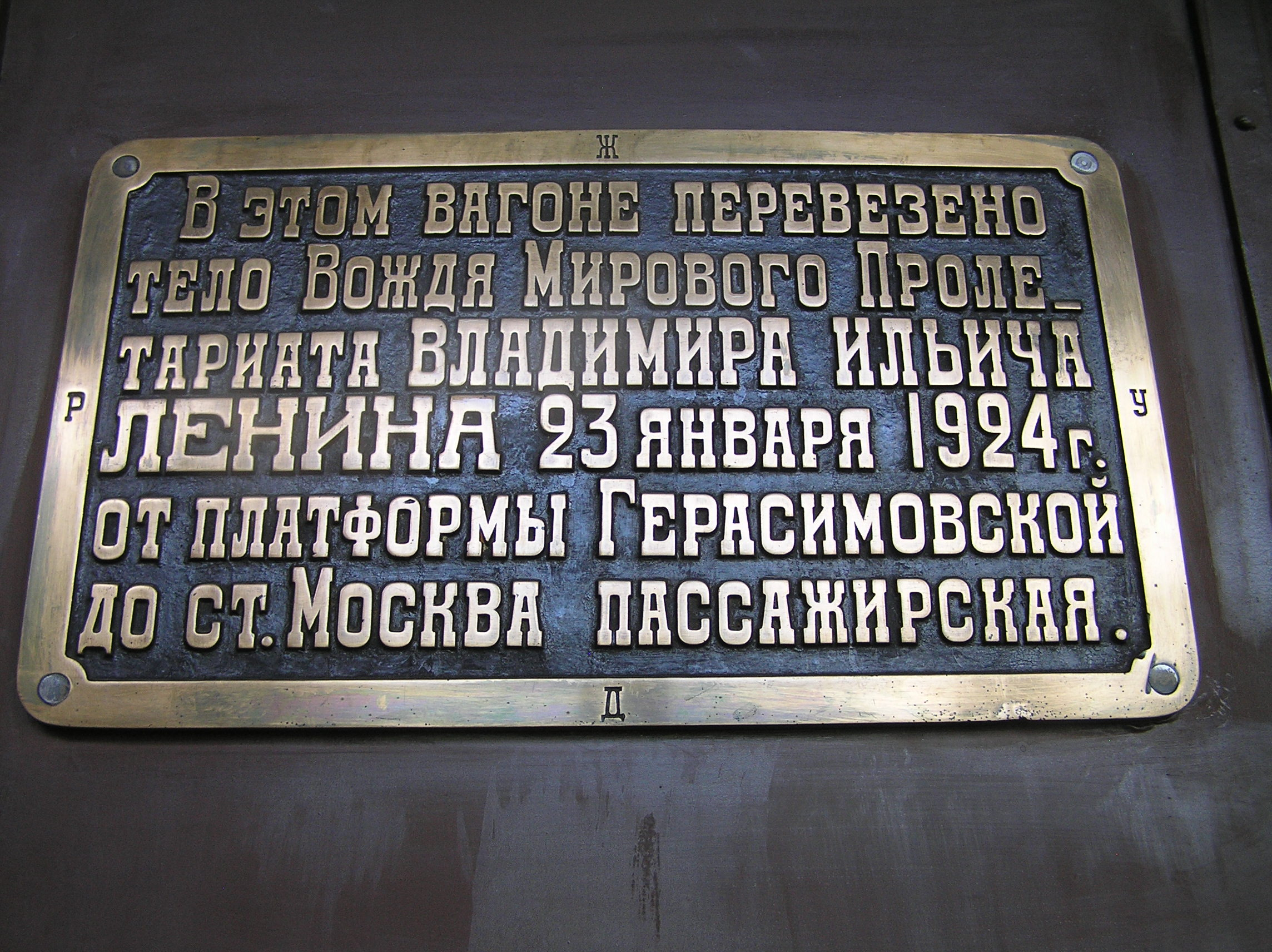
Inscription plaque

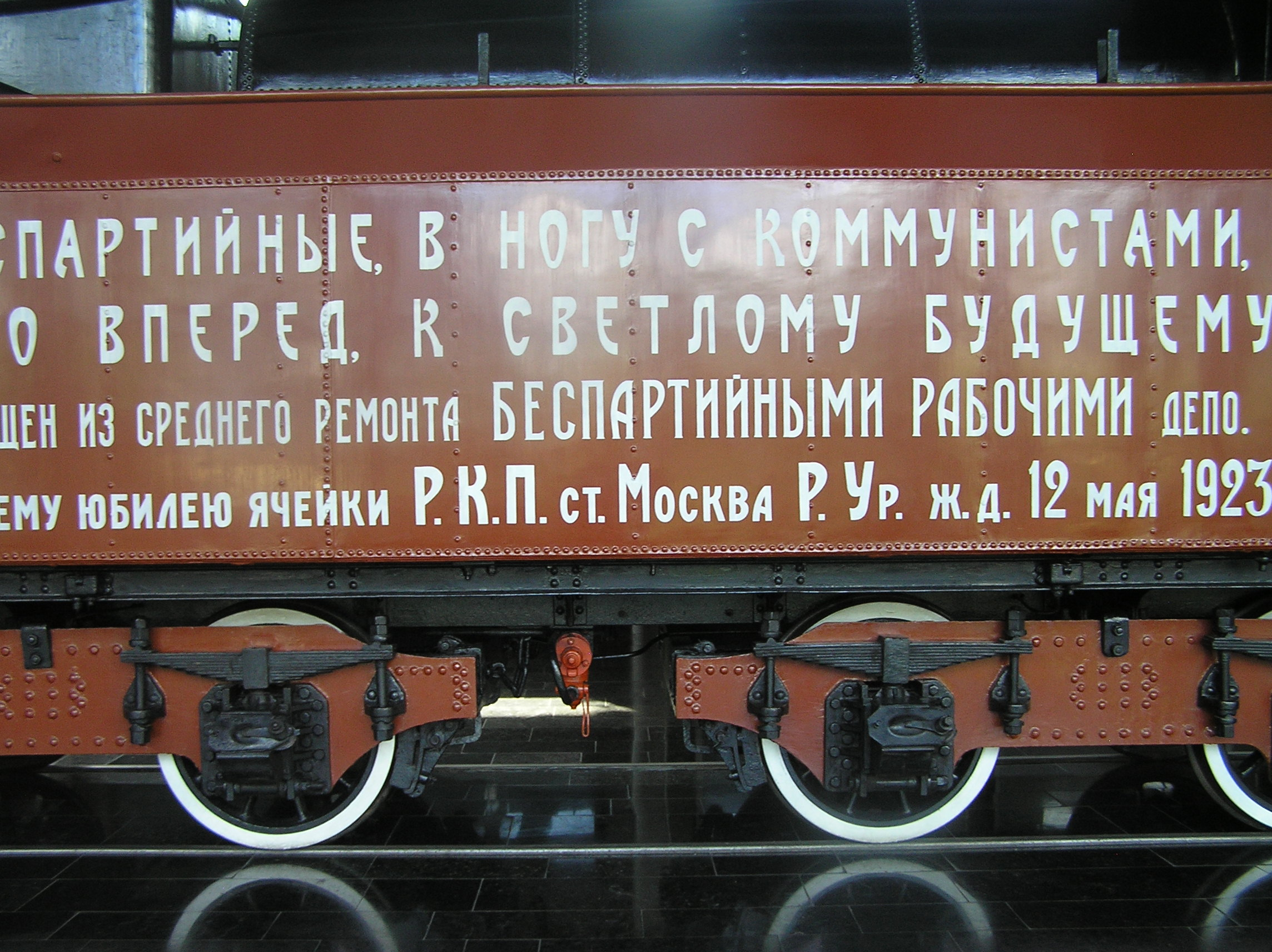
Tender with inscription

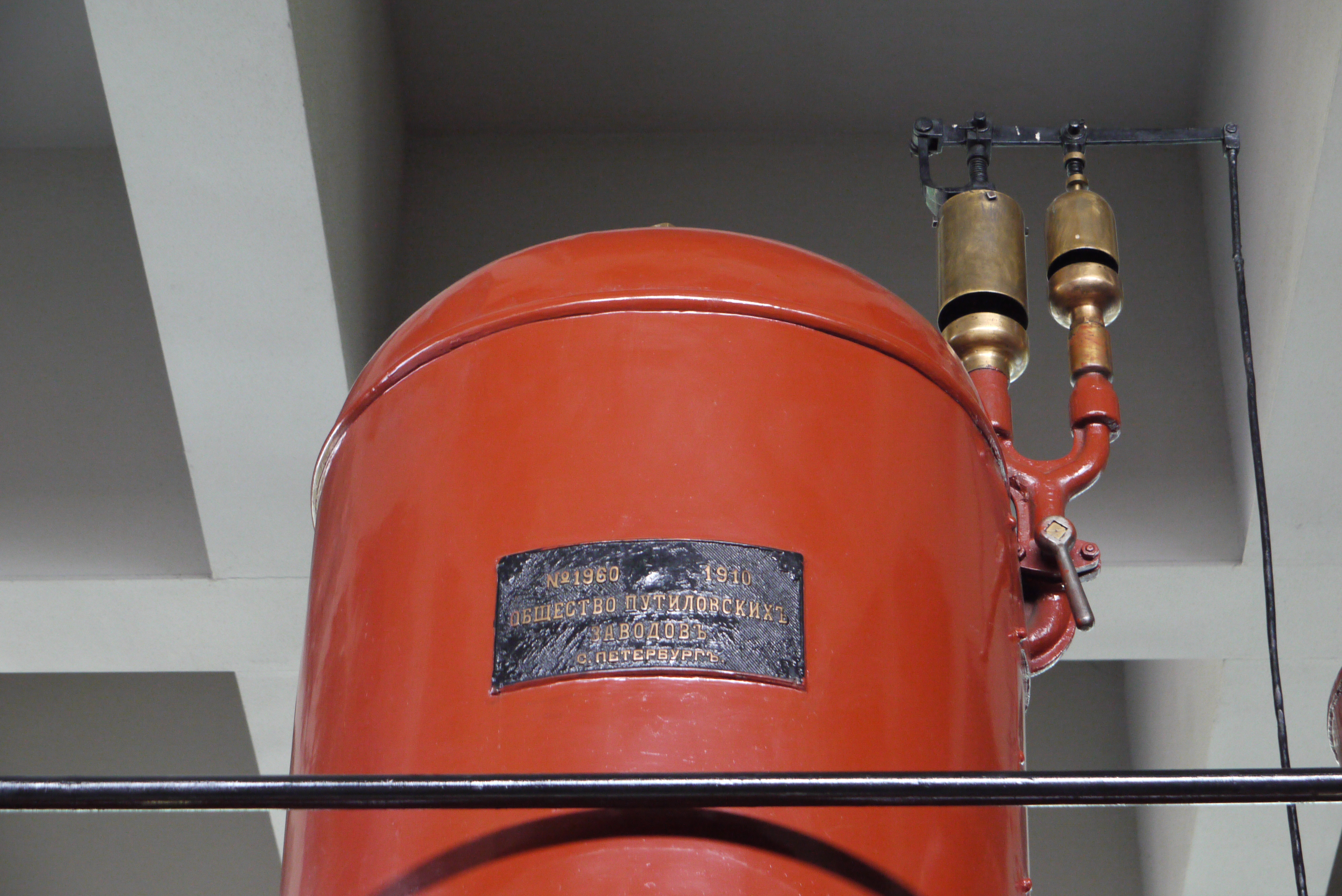
Builder's plate, steam dome and whistle

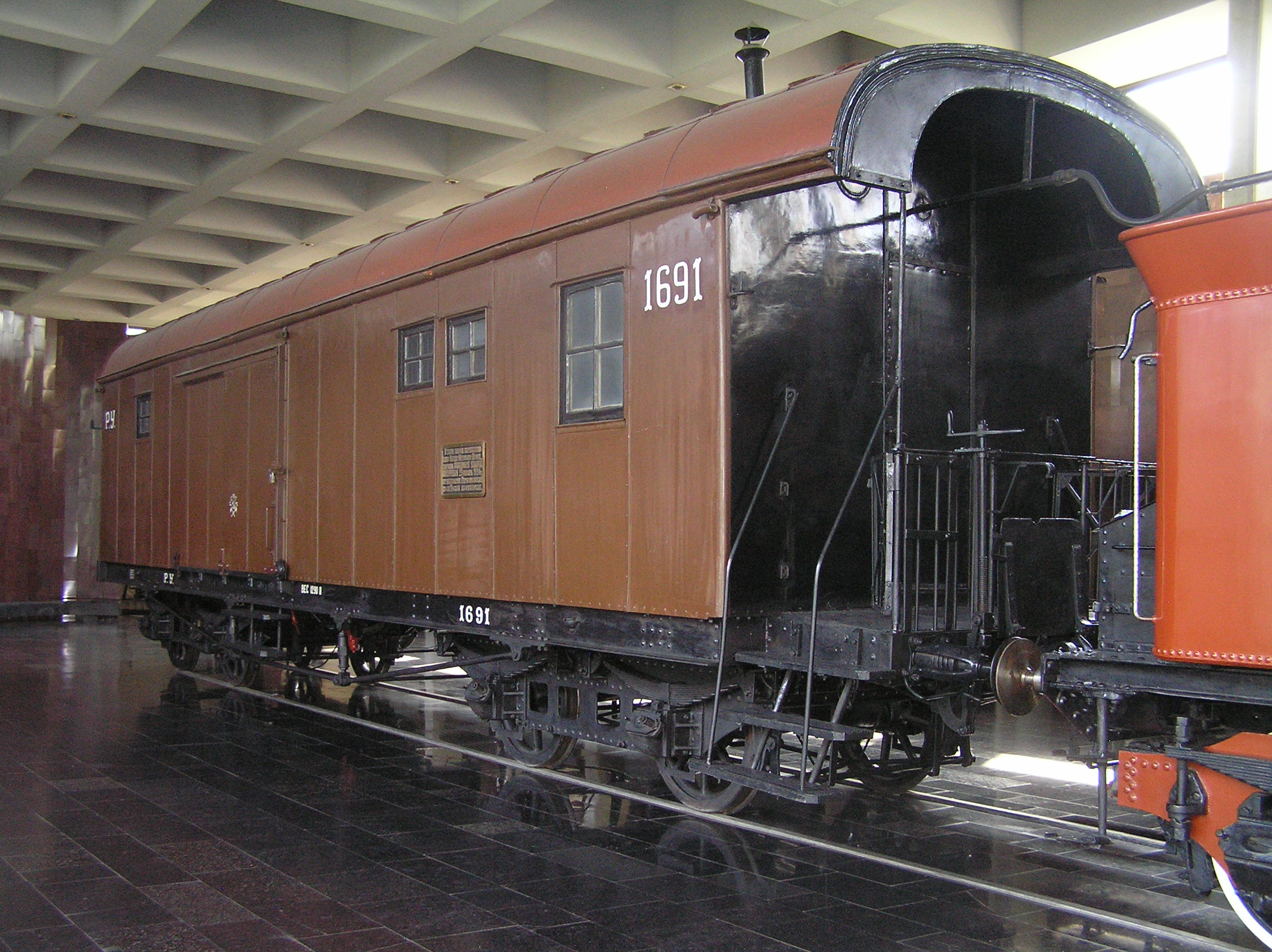
Van 1691

== See also ==
- Restored trains
- Finland Station, St.Petersburg: arrival point of Lenin from exile
