= You (Chinese given name) =

You is the Mandarin Pinyin spelling of a Chinese given name.

People with this name include:

- Du You (735–812), Chinese historian, military general, and politician
- Gao You (c. 168–212), Chinese historian, philosopher
- Lu You, Chinese historian and poet of the Southern Song dynasty (1125–1210)
- Shi You (fl. 48–33 BC), Chinese calligrapher, eunuch, and writer of the Han dynasty
- Wang You (1910–1997), Chinese biochemist
- Xu You (hermit) (fl. 23rd century BC), legendary hermit during Emperor Yao's time
- Xu You (Han dynasty) (died 204), Han dynasty strategist
- Xu You (Southern Tang) (fl. 960), Southern Tang dynasty minister
- Xun You (157–214), statesman who lived during the late Eastern Han dynasty of China
- Yang You, emperor of the Chinese Sui dynasty
- Yang You (scientist) (born 1917), Chinese scientist and former president of Sanda University between 1992 and 1997

== See also ==
- Yu (Chinese given name)
