= Yu (Chinese given name) =

Yu is the Mandarin Pinyin spelling of a Chinese given name.

People with this name include:

- Bai Yu (actor) (born 1990), Chinese actor
- Bai Yu (actress), Chinese producer, actress, and director
- Chang Yu (tennis), retired Chinese tennis player.
- Cheng Rui (died 903), Tang dynasty warlord known as Guo Yu at one point
- Du Yu (223–285), Chinese classicist, military general, and politician
- Du Yu (composer), Chinese composer
- Du Yu (sport shooter) (born 1986), Chinese trap shooter
- Duan Yu (1083–1176), courtesy name Heyu, also known by his temple name as the Emperor Xianzong of Dali, was the 16th emperor of the Dali Kingdom
- Emperor Suzong of Tang (711–762), personal name Li Yu, emperor of the Tang dynasty
- Emperor Daizong of Tang (727–779), personal name Li Yu, emperor of the Tang dynasty, Emperor Suzong's son
- Gao Yu (died 929), chief strategist
- Gao Yu (journalist) (born 1944), Chinese journalist and dissident
- Ha Yu (actor) (born 1946), or Xia Yu, Hong Kong actor
- Huduershidaogao (34 BC-AD 46), born Yu, Xiongnu chanyu
- Jessica Henwick (born 1992), British actress
- Ji Yu (姬虞; fl. 1042 BC), better known as Shu Yu of Tang
- Ji Yu (姬圉; d. 637 BC), better known as Duke Huai of Jin
- Li Yu, Prince of Dan (died 820), Emperor Daizong of Tang's son
- Li Yu, Prince of De (died 905), Emperor Zhaozong of Tang's son, briefly a puppet emperor
- Li Yu (Later Tang) (died 935), chief councilor of the Later Tang dynasty
- Li Yu (Southern Tang) (937–978), ruler of the Southern Tang dynasty, also a famous poet
- Li Yu (author) (1610–1680), Chinese author during the Ming and Qing dynasties
- Li Yu (speed skater) (born 1961), Chinese short track speed skater
- Li Yu (director) (born 1973), Chinese film director and screenwriter
- Lian Yu (born 1886), a diplomat, politician, judicial officer and lawyer in the Republic of China
- Peggy Yu or Yu Yu (Chinese: 俞渝; pinyin: Yú Yú; born 1965), Chinese businesswoman
- Phil Chang (張宇; born 1967), Taiwanese singer-songwriter
- Xia Yu (actor) (born 1978), Chinese actor
- Yu Tsai, American photographer
- Yu the Great (禹 or 大禹) (2200–2100 BC), founder of the Xia dynasty
- Zhang Yu (actress) (张瑜; born 1957), Chinese film actress
- Zhang Yu (basketball) (张瑜; born 1986), Chinese basketball player
- Zhang Yu (footballer, born 1994) (张瑀), Chinese footballer
- Zhang Yu (footballer, born 2001) (张禹), Chinese footballer
- Zhang Yu (general) (張玉; 1343–1401), Ming dynasty general
- Zhang Yu (hurdler) (张瑜; born 1971), Chinese hurdler
- Zhang Yu (Nanhe) (張裕; died 219), courtesy name Nanhe, official serving under the Eastern Han dynasty warlord Liu Bei
- Zhang Yu (sport shooter) (born 2000), Chinese sports shooter
- Zhang Yu (tennis) (born 1976), Chinese tennis player
- Zhang Yu (voice actress) (张昱; born 1988), Chinese voice actress known for Overwatch
- Zhang Yu (volleyball) (张宇; born 1995), Chinese volleyball player
- Zhou Yu (175–210), Han dynasty general who served the warlords Sun Ce and his successor Sun Quan
- Zhou Yu (Renming) (fl. 2nd century), Han dynasty official who served the warlords Cao Cao and Yuan Shao
- Zhou Yu (canoeist) (born 1989), Chinese sprint canoeist
- Zhou Yu (table tennis) (born 1992), Chinese table tennis player

== See also ==
- You (Chinese given name), transliteration of several Chinese given names, spelled Yu in the Wade–Giles romanization system
