= Museum of the Moscow Railway (Paveletskaya station) =

Museum in Moscow, Russia

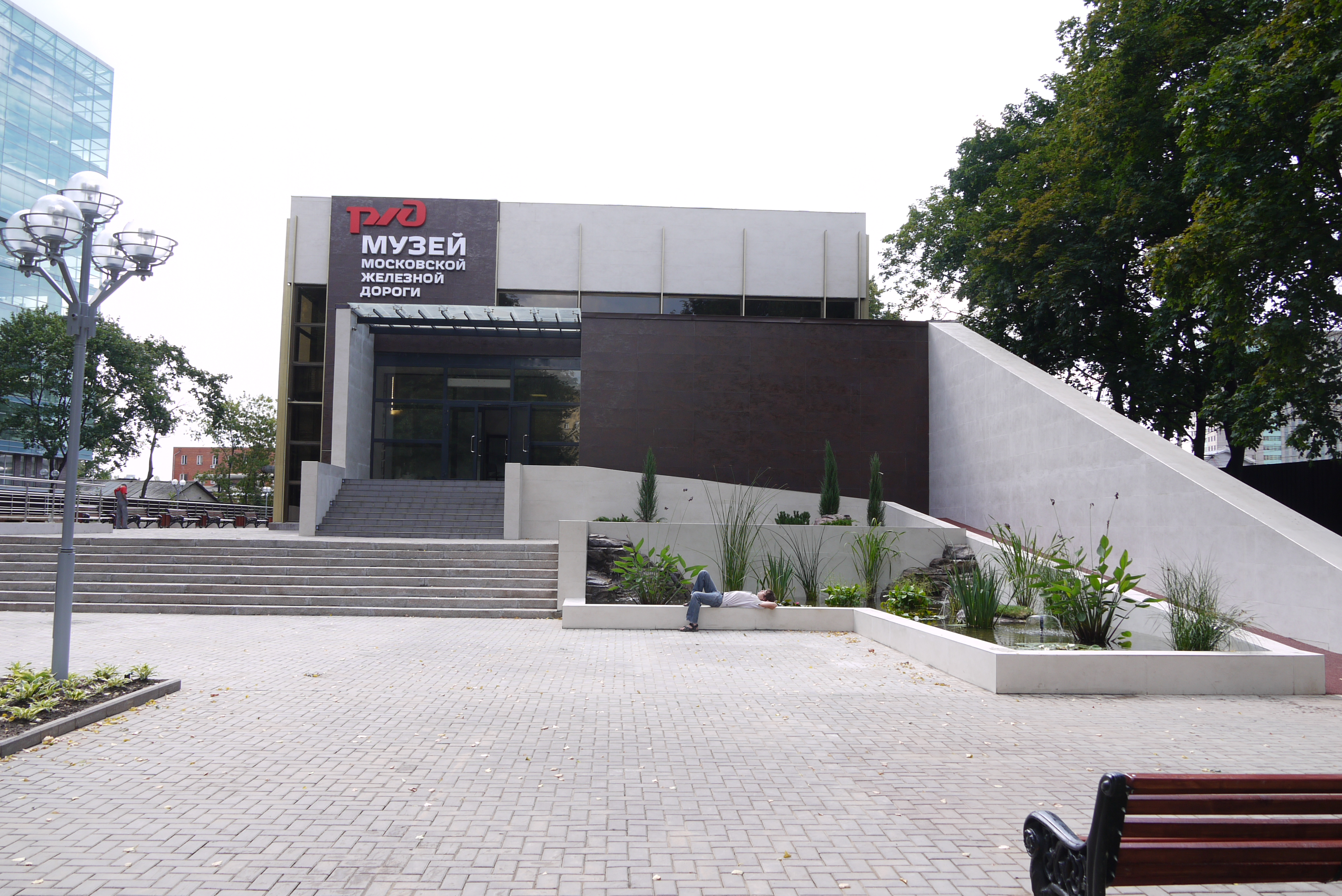
- Museum Entrance

- Location within Moscow
- Location: Moscow
- Coordinates: 55.728338°N 37.642196°E
- Website: mzd.rzd.ru

The Museum of the Moscow Railway (Russian: Музей Московской железной дороги) is situated next to Paveletsky Rail Terminal in Moscow. The museum reopened to private visitors in 2011 and it reopened to the general public in January 2012. It's the object of cultural heritage of Russia.

== Overview ==
The museum was formerly the Museum of Lenin's funeral train. It still houses exhibits relating to Vladimir Lenin's Funeral train including the 4-6-0 steam locomotive U-127 (Russian У-127) and Lenin's funeral van No 1691.

Exhibits at the museum
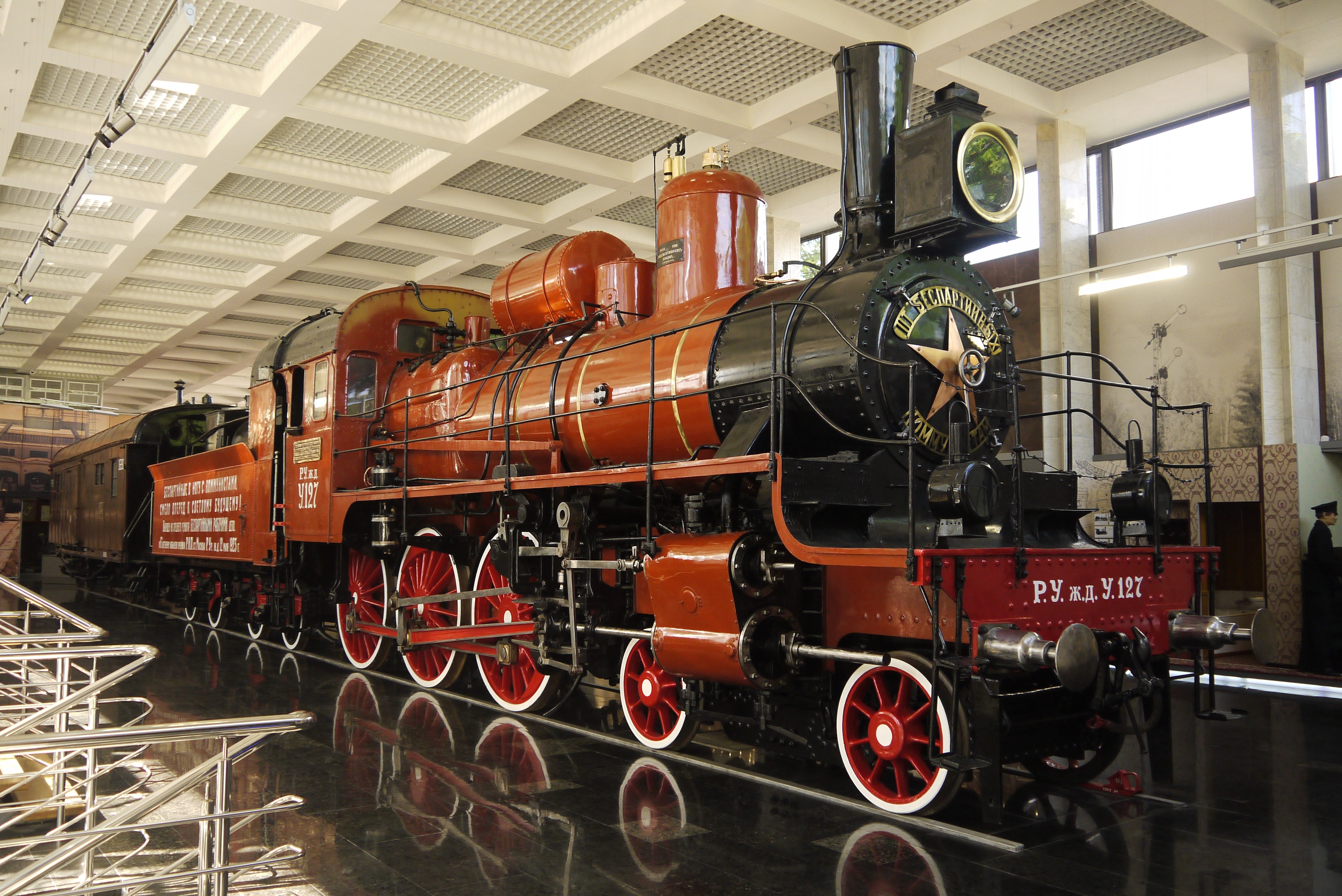
Steam locomotive U-127, the principal exhibit of the Museum

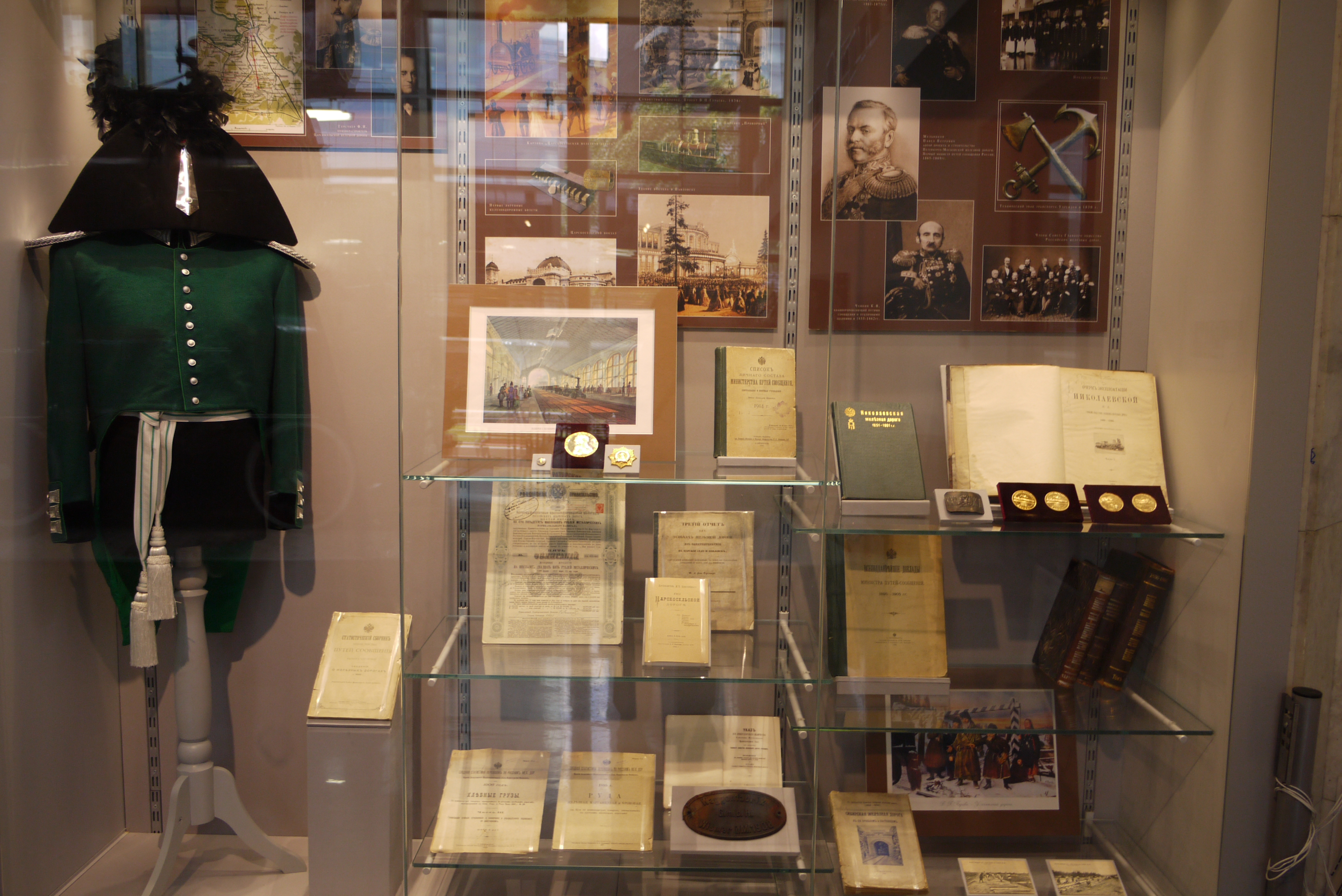
Exhibit case

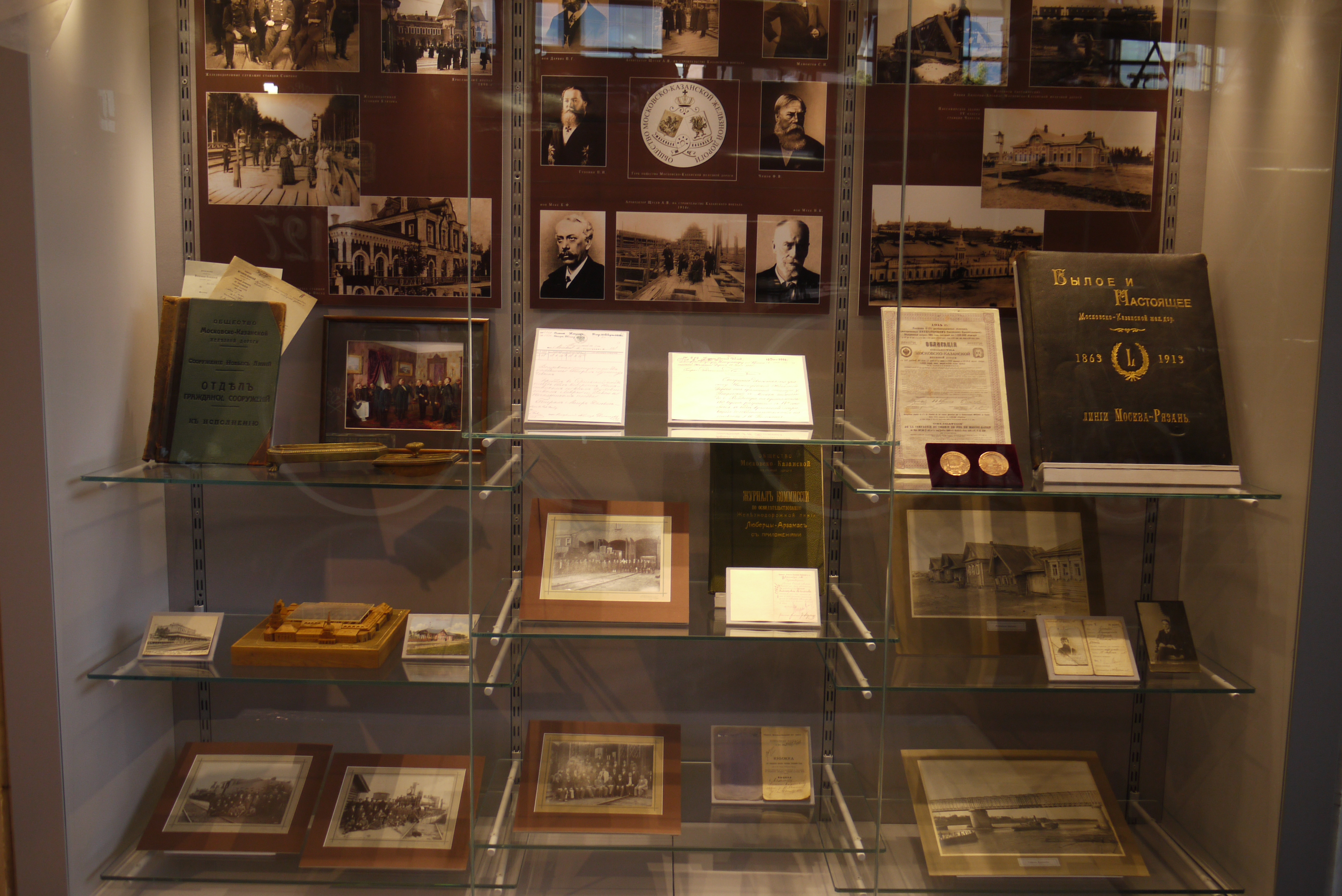
Exhibit case

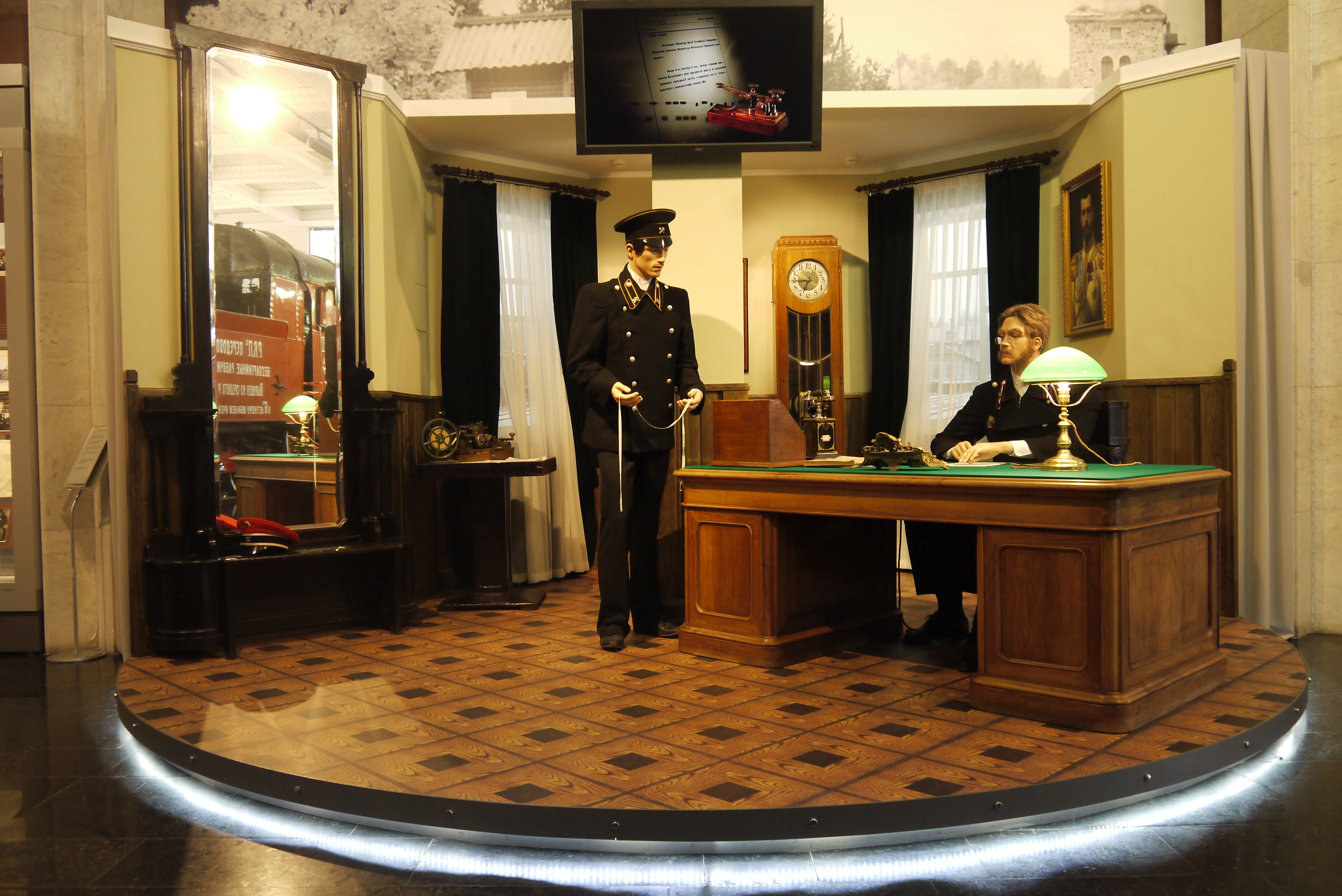
Model of a 19th-century Russian railway office

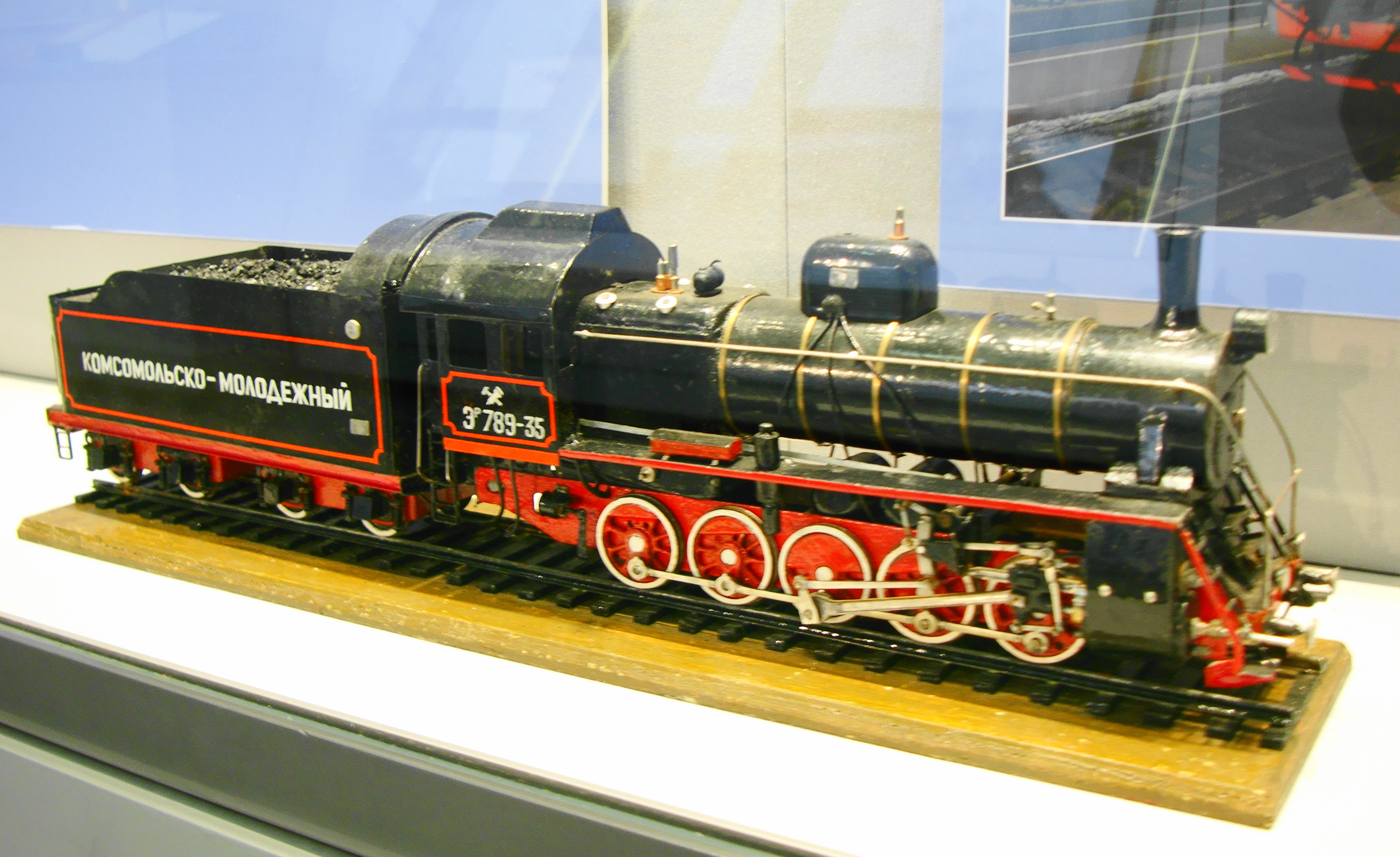
Scale model of a Russian locomotive class E

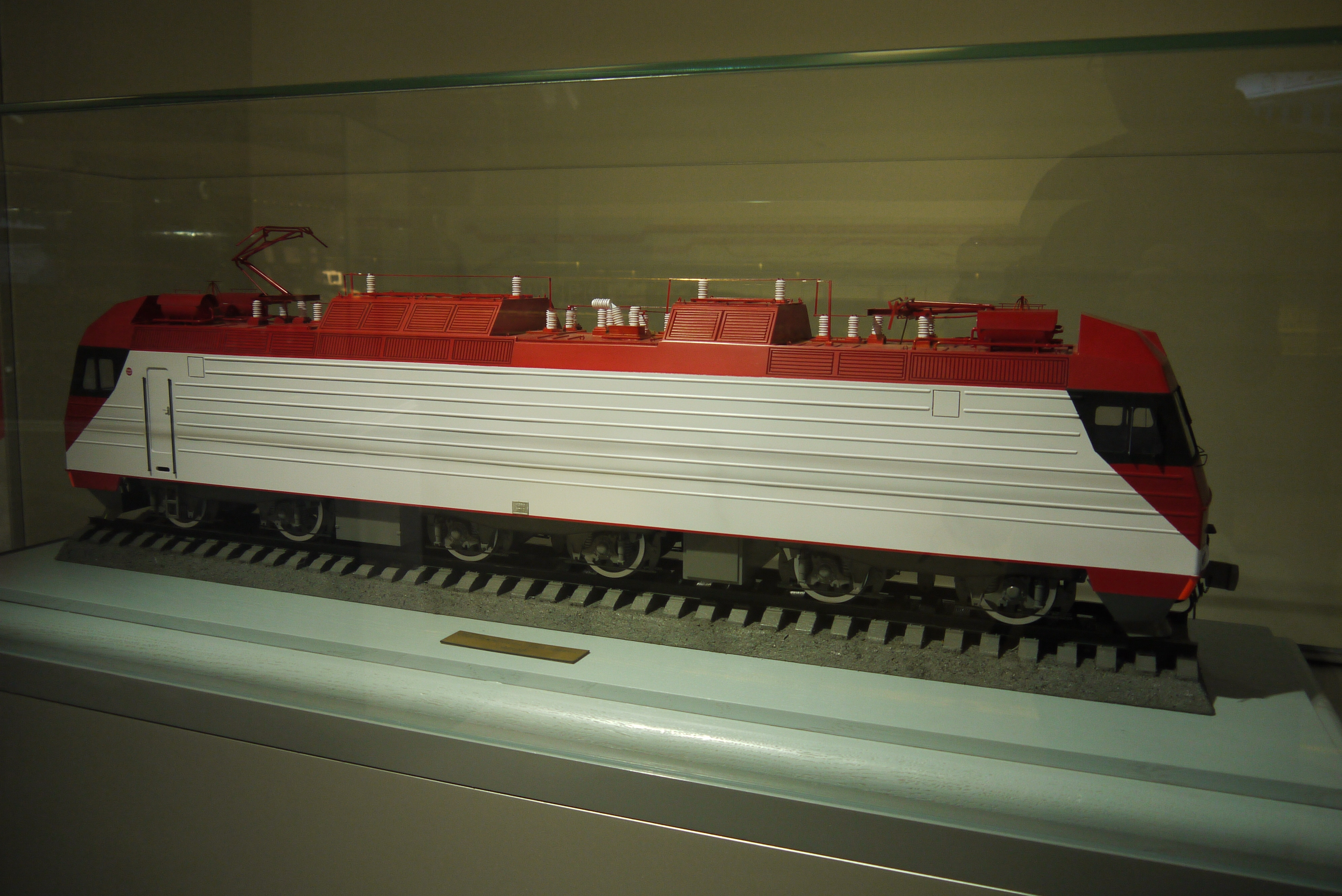
Scale model of a Russian electric EP10 Locomotive

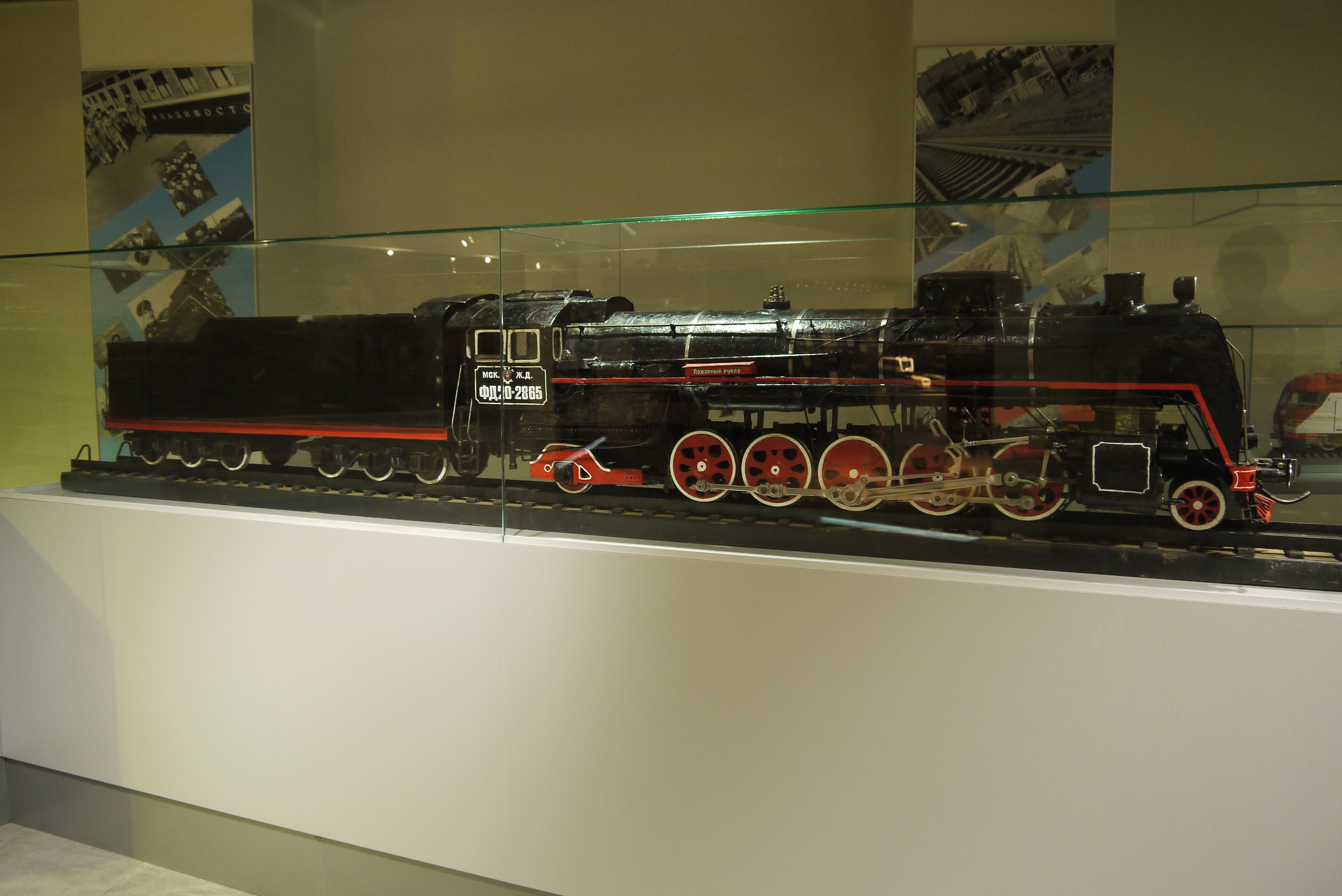
Model of a Russian locomotive class FD number FD20-2865

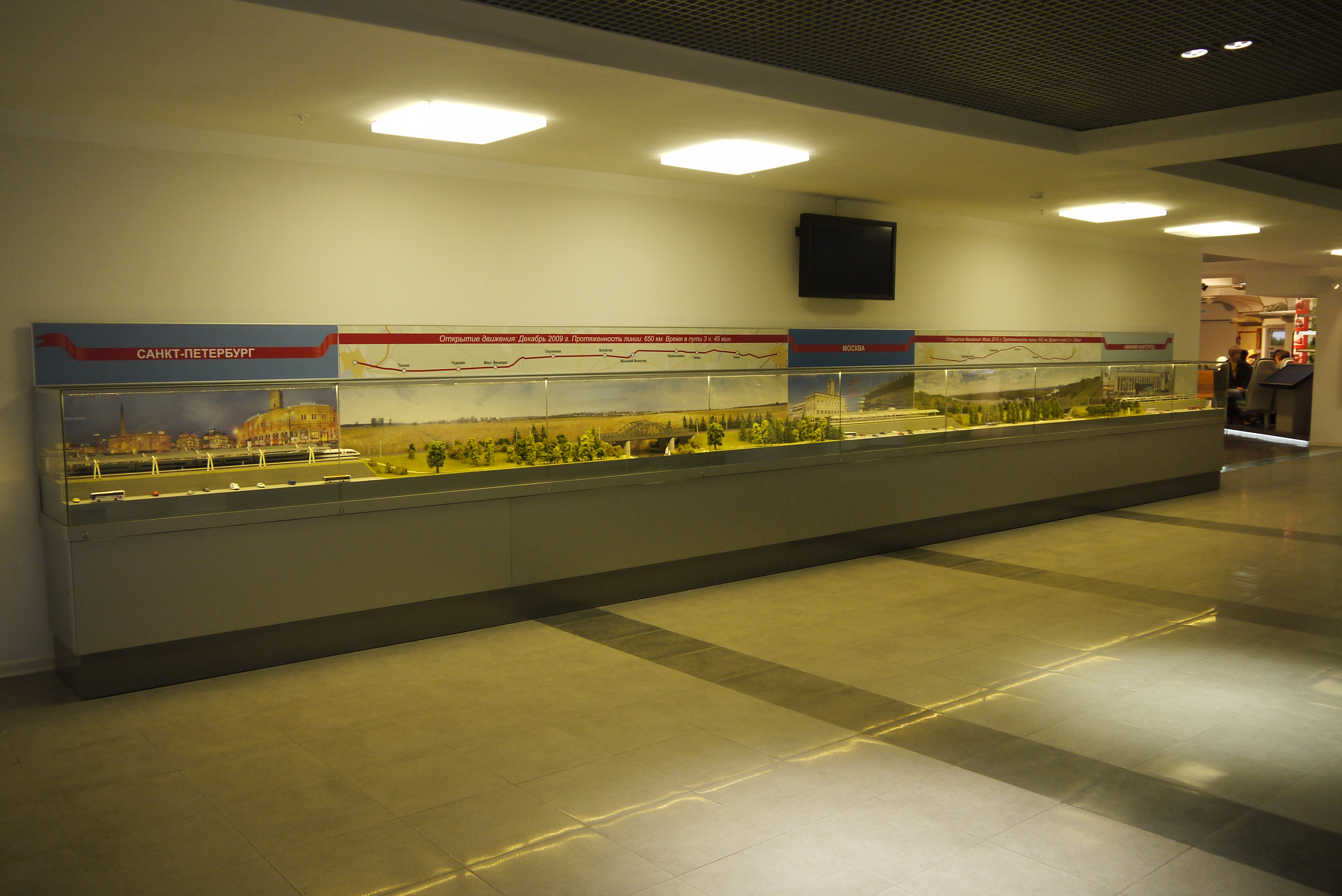
Scale model railway of the Sapsan Railway

== See also ==
- Moscow Railway Museum at Rizhsky station
- History of rail transport in Russia
- List of Moscow tourist attractions
- List of railway museums (worldwide)
- Russian Railway Museum, Saint Petersburg
