= Yew Tree =

Yew Tree may refer to:

- Yew, any of various coniferous plants
- Yew Tree, West Bromwich, West Midlands, England
- Yew Tree Tarn, a lake in the Lake District, England
- Yew Tree (ward), an electoral division in Liverpool
- Yew Tree Colliery, a coalfield in Tyldesley, Greater Manchester
- Operation Yewtree, a British police investigation into sexual abuse
- Yewtree Lodge, a fictional location in the novel A Pocket Full of Rye

== See also ==
- Yew Tee
