= UD =

UD or ud may refer to:

== Companies ==
- UD Trucks, a Japanese truck manufacturer
- United Devices, a commercial distributed computing company
- United Distillers, a whiskey holding company
- Unterrified Democrat, an American newspaper
- Upper Deck, a manufacturer of collectibles and trading cards
- Hex'Air (IATA airline designator UD), a French regional airline

== Organizations ==
- Unificación Democrática, the Democratic Unification political party in Honduras
- Unión Democrática, a political party in Guatemala
- Unlock Democracy, a British political organization
- Utenriksdepartementet, the Norwegian Ministry of Foreign Affairs
- Utrikesdepartementet, the Swedish Ministry of Foreign Affairs

== Schools ==
=== U.S. ===
- University of Dallas, Texas
- University of Dayton, Ohio
- University of Delaware
- University of Dubuque, Iowa
- University of Detroit Mercy, a Catholic university in Michigan
- University of Detroit Jesuit High School and Academy, a Catholic secondary school in Michigan

=== Elsewhere ===
- University of Dammam, Saudi Arabia
- University of Dublin, Ireland
- University of Durham, U.K.

== Other ==
- Ud., an abbreviation of the Spanish personal pronoun usted
- Udonis Haslem, American basketball player nicknamed UD and Captain UD
- Ud (cuneiform), a sign in cuneiform writing
- Universal Dependencies, a project in analyzing syntax
- Unanimous decision, in combat sports
- Unlawful detainer, or eviction, in property law
- Urban Dictionary, a crowdsourced online slang dictionary
- Regional decentralization entity of Udine, a province in Italy whose postal abbreviation is "UD"

== See also ==
- Oud (sometimes spelled as ud), a short-neck lute-type, pear-shaped, fretless stringed instrument
