= Yu =

Yu or YU may refer to:

== Arts and entertainment ==
=== Music ===
- Yu (wind instrument), an ancient Chinese free-reed mouth organ, larger than the sheng
- Yu (percussion instrument), an ancient Chinese musical instrument in a shape of a tiger with a serrated back or/and front

=== Other media ===
- Yu (film), a 2003 Austrian film
- Yu-Gi-Oh!, a Japanese manga series
- YuYu Hakusho, a Japanese manga series
- Yu (Stargate), a System Lord from the science fiction series Stargate SG-1
- Yu Narukami, a character from the video game Persona 4

== Businesses and organizations ==
=== Universities ===
- Yale University, New Haven, United States
- Al-Yamamah Private University, Riyadh, Saudi Arabia
- Yamagata University, Yamagata, Japan
- Yarmouk University, Irbid, Jordan
- Yeshiva University, New York City, United States
- Yeungnam University, Gyeongsang, South Korea
- Yonsei University, Seoul, South Korea
- York University, Toronto, Canada

=== Other businesses and organizations ===
- YU Televentures, an Indian mobile handset manufacturer
- Youth United, an Indian organization in Delhi, Chandigarh, Patiala and Bangalore
- Youth Unlimited, a youth ministry in Canada and the United States
- YU, the IATA code for EuroAtlantic Airways

== Letters ==
- U, in English
- Yu (Cyrillic), in the Cyrillic alphabet (Ю)
- Yu (kana), romanisation of the Japanese ゆ and ユ

== Names and people ==
- Yu the Great, legendary king in ancient China
- Yu (Chinese surname) (余, 于, 魚/鱼, 漁/渔, 楀, 喻, 兪, 於, 遇, 虞, 郁, 尉, 禹, 游, 尤, 庾, 娛/娱)
  - List of people with surname Yu
- Yu (Chinese given name)
- Yū, a Japanese given name, including variants Yu, Yuu, and Yui
- Yu People (俞/余), an ethnic group in ancient China
- Yoo (Korean surname) (兪, 庾, 劉, 柳), a common Korean family name
- You (surname), transliteration of several Chinese surnames, spelled Yu in the Wade–Giles romanization system

== Places ==
=== In China ===
- Chongqing, officially abbreviated to Yú (渝)
- Henan, officially abbreviated to Yù (豫)
  - Yu opera, Chinese opera of Henan
- Yü (region) (དབུས།, 衛), geographic division of Tibet
- Yu County, Hebei (蔚县)
- Yu County, Shanxi (盂县)
- Yu (Chinese state) (虞), an ancient duchy in what is today China overthrown by Duke Xian of Jin
- Yu River (Guangxi) (郁江), China

=== Other places ===
- Yu, a village in Pate, Cambodia
- Yu River in the Kabaw Valley, Myanmar
- Yu (Vychegda), a river in Komi Republic, Russia
- Yugoslavia:
  - Socialist Federal Republic of Yugoslavia (old ISO country code and derived ccTLD .yu)
  - Federal Republic of Yugoslavia (old ISO country code and derived ccTLD .yu)

== Other ==
- Yu, a transparent rice wine from Manipur

== See also ==
- Ye (disambiguation)
- You (disambiguation)
