= Yoo =

Yoo may refer to:

- Yoo (Korean surname), also spelled Ryu or Yu, a Korean family name
- YOO, the IATA code for Oshawa Airport

== See also ==
- You, a pronoun
