= Cherepanov steam locomotive =

First steam locomotive built in Russia

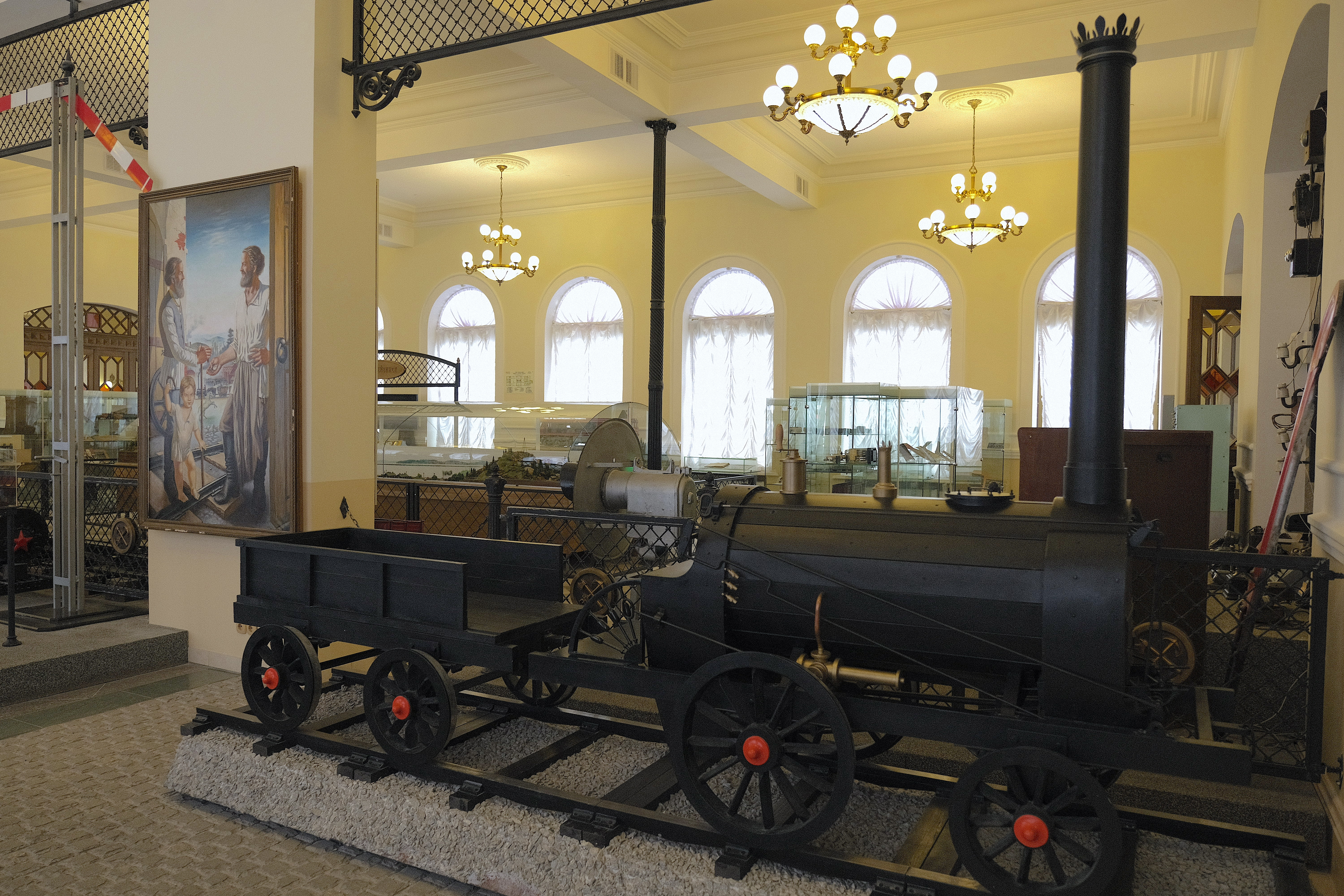
Model held in the Sverdlovsk Railway Museum

The Cherepanov steam locomotive (Russian: Парово́зы Черепа́новых) was the first steam locomotive built in the Russian Empire. Yefim and Miron Cherepanov constructed the locomotive in 1834. The model ran from a factory in Nizhny Tagil to a nearby mine. The track constructed to complement the locomotive would be the first steam railway in Russia. They constructed a second model to be sent to Saint Petersburg in 1835.

Though horse-powered transport would be the dominant form of transporting goods in Russia for many of the following years, the construction of the locomotive may have been influential in the growth of rail transport in Russia.

== Background ==
Yefim Cherepanov and his son, Miron, were serfs to the Demidov family of factory-owners and developed several innovations while working for them. The pair had been building steam engines for many years, to pump water in the mines. Both of them had travelled to the United Kingdom separately, with Miron going in 1833. While he was there, he was noted with having inspected the steam locomotives there. However, Russian scholars insist that the steam locomotive was the Cherepanov's own invention and not a copy of the British model.

== Construction and description ==
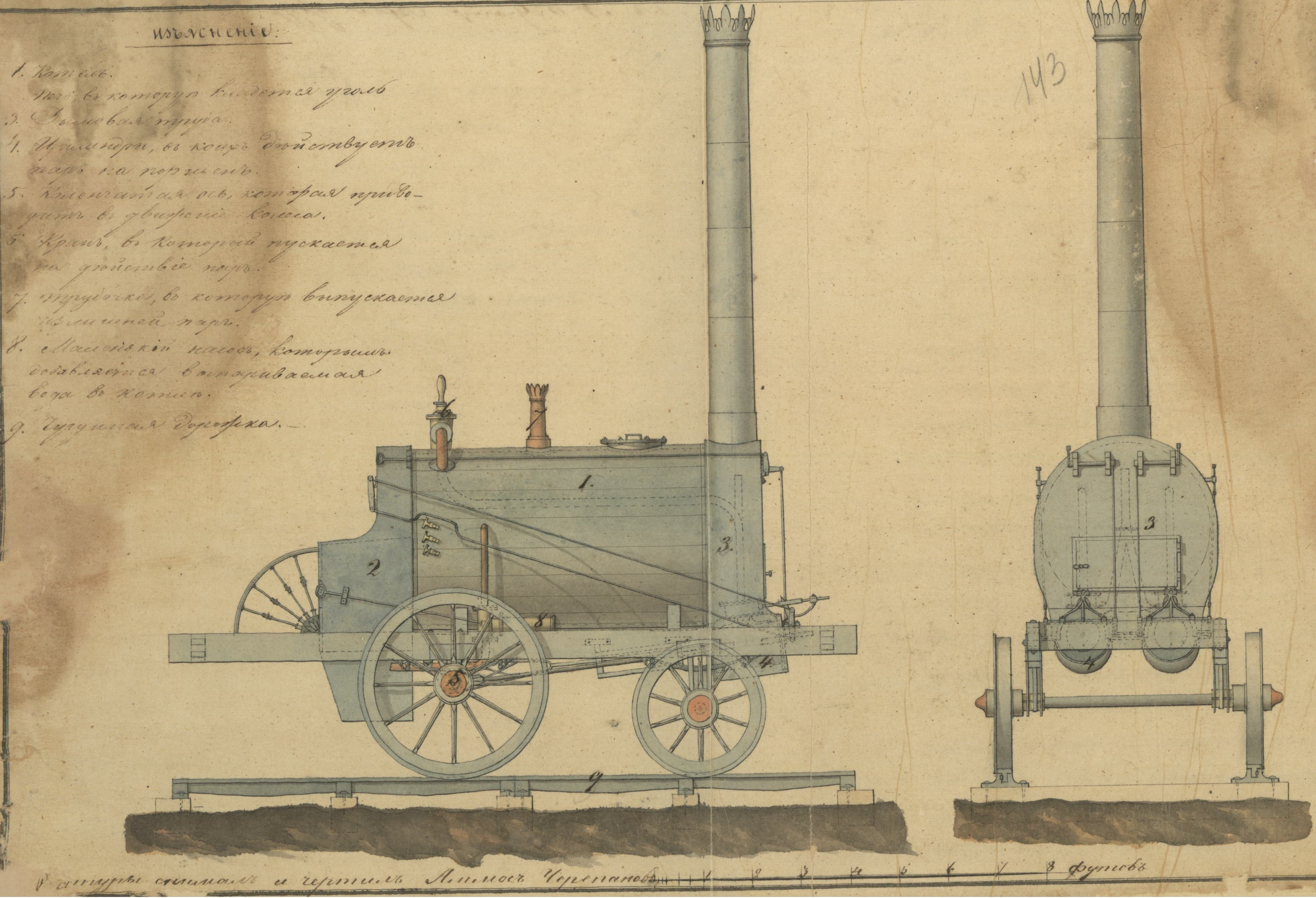
Works drawing from the Nizhny Tagil factory

The first model of the locomotive was completed in 1834, after around six months of work within the duo's free time. In August of that year, people gathered to watch an exhibition of the locomotive on track that measured around 854 meters. The locomotive was noted to have transported 3.2 tons of cargo at a speed of around 15 kilometers per hour. That weight would have required around 50 to 60 workers to transport, and around 30 minutes. The locomotive was able to do it in four minutes. It was measured at 30 horsepower. Their second model, built in March 1835 and gifted to Saint Petersburg, improved upon those statistics, carrying a weight of around 1,000 poods at a speed of around 16.4 kilometers per hour. The first model stayed in the factory, on a two-kilometer track from the factory to a nearby mine. This track was the first steam railway in Russia.

== Reception and aftermath ==
The development of the locomotive would give Yefim his freedom and Miron would be freed three years later. They were denied a patent for their invention and the pair had died not long after, Yefim in 1842 and Miron in 1849.

The main problem with the exploitation of their locomotives was lack of coal in the area, and after all the wood nearby had been cut down and getting firewood from afar had got expensive, the line had to be converted to horse traction.

The first state-sponsored railways in Russia actually imported locomotives from other countries to start. It was not until 1857 when a Russian-built locomotive was used outside of a factory.

The locomotive is still represented and honored in modern history. Its history can be found in an exhibit of The Nizhny Tagil Museum of Regional History and the Polytechnic Museum. It was also featured on several postage stamps.
