= Nizhny Tagil Institute of Technology =

Higher education institution in Nizhny Tagil

- Нижнетагильский технологический институт
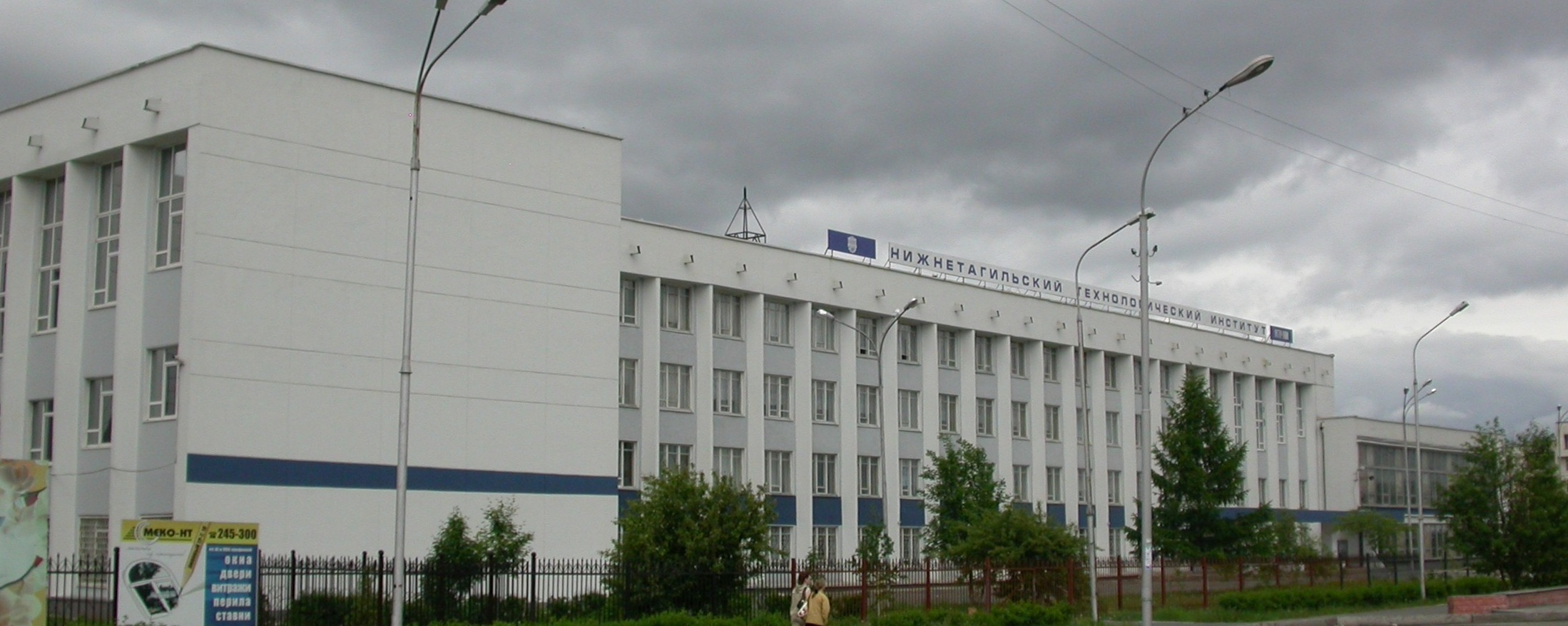
- Established: 1944
- Parent institution: Ural Federal University
- Location: Nizhny Tagil, Russia
- Language: Russian
- Website: https://nti.urfu.ru/

The Nizhny Tagil Institute of Technology (Russian: Нижне-Тагильский государственный социально-педагогический институт) is a higher education institution in Nizhny Tagil, founded on 24 July 1944 for the training of engineering and technical personnel. It was reorganized on 1 July 1947 by joining the Ural State Technical University named after S. M. Kirov (since 2009 - Ural Federal University).

== History ==
On 24 July 1944, by the Decree of the Council of People's Commissars of the USSR No. 884 and the order of the People's Commissariat of Ferrous Metallurgy of the USSR No. 342, the Nizhny Tagil Institute of Technology was established to train engineering and technical personnel. E. K. Vyatkin was appointed the first rector of the institute. The institute was allocated three buildings on Uralskaya Street in Nizhny Tagil. The structure of the institute included twenty-five general institute departments and three faculties: mechanical, mining and metallurgical and evening. In 1944, the first hundred students were admitted to the first year of the institute, students from the Bezhitsk Mechanical Engineering Institute and the Kryvyi Rih National University evacuated to the rear of the country were enrolled in the senior courses of the institute. In the early years, due to a shortage of full-time teaching staff, lectures were given to students by invited teachers from other higher educational institutions, among the invited lecturers was Professor Boris Rauschenbach.

In 1946, the institute graduated the first thirteen people from the evening department as engineers with a degree in mechanical engineering technology. On 1 July 1947, by order of the Ministry of Higher and Secondary Specialized Education of the USSR, the Nizhny Tagil Institute of Technology was reorganized and merged with the Ural Polytechnic Institute named after S. M. Kirov as the Nizhny Tagil Correspondence Department. In 1947, five hundred and thirty-seven students studied at the institute, who mastered nine specialties; the institute staff consisted of about one hundred teachers. On 15 September 1950, by order of the Ministry of Higher and Secondary Specialized Education of the USSR, the Nizhny Tagil Correspondence Department was transformed into the Nizhny Tagil Evening Department, consisting of two faculties: ferrous metallurgy and engineering technology. On 21 July 1953, by order of the Ministry of Higher and Secondary Specialized Education of the USSR, on the basis of the Nizhny Tagil Correspondence Department, the Nizhny Tagil Faculty of Correspondence and Evening Education was established, in which training was conducted in ten engineering and technical specialties. In 1956, the first forty-four engineers graduated from the faculty. In 1969, a preparatory department was opened as part of the faculty.

On 19 October 1970, by order of the Ministry of Higher and Secondary Specialized Education of the USSR, the Nizhny Tagil Faculty of Correspondence and Evening Education was reorganized into the Nizhny Tagil Branch of the Ural Polytechnic Institute named after S. M. Kirov, the structure of the branch included evening and day departments, classes were conducted in two specialties: “Processing metals by pressure” and “Technology of special engineering”. The full-time professorial and pedagogical staff consisted of sixty-four teachers. The total number of students reached 1385 people, of which: 1360 in the evening and 25 in the daytime departments. On 6 June 1974, as part of the Nizhny Tagil branch, the Nizhny Tagil Daytime Faculty of Mechanics and Technology was established, which trains engineers in four specialties: "Equipment and technology of welding production", "Production of buildings", "Industrial and civil engineering" and "Metal forming". In 1976, the first graduation of this faculty of engineering and technical personnel took place numbering forty-seven people. In 1984, the structure of the Nizhny Tagil branch was created two departments: evening and day, three faculties: mechanical engineering, power engineering and mechanical engineering and seven departments consisting of one hundred and twenty teachers. In 1994, a military department was created in the structure of the branch, for the training of officers.

On 4 January 1996, by the Decree of the Government of the Russian Federation and the order of the State Committee of the Russian Federation for Higher Education No. 25, the Nizhny Tagil Institute of USTU-UPI was established on the basis of the Nizhny Tagil branch. On May 12, 2000, by order of the Ministry of Education of the Russian Federation, the Nizhny Tagil Institute was renamed the Nizhny Tagil Institute of Technology. Nineteen general institute departments were created in the structure of the institute, in 2003 the Nizhny Tagil Machine-Building College was included in the institute as a faculty of secondary vocational education. The total number of students studying at the institute is 5000 people. The teaching staff of the institute includes two hundred and fifty teachers, of which 13 people have the degree of doctor of science, 57 Candidate of Sciences, 25 docent, and 10 professors. From 1944 to 2019, the institute trained 20 thousand engineering and technical personnel.

== Management ==
- Vyatkin, Efim Kirillovich (1945–1968)
- Kotelnikov, Veniamin Petrovich (1962–1979)
- Krutyakov, Ivan Fedorovich (1979–1984)
- Zudov, Evgeny Georgievich (1984–2004)
- Pegashkin, Vladimir Fedorovich (2004–2016)
- Potanin, Vladislav Vladimirovich (since 2016)

== Notable teachers ==
- Boris Rauschenbach
- Fainshmidt, Evgeny Mikhailovich

== Famous graduates ==
- Gennady Kolbin - Chairman of the USSR People's Control Committee
- Ilyushin, Viktor Vasilyevich - First Deputy Prime Minister of the Russian Federation
- Vlaskin, Egor Fedorovich - Deputy Minister of the Chemical Industry of the USSR
- Veer, Artur Pavlovich - Deputy of the State Duma of the 1st convocation
- Didenko, Nikolai Naumovich - the first Head of the city of Nizhny Tagil
- Balyberdin, Alexey Vladimirovich - Deputy of the State Duma of the VII convocation
- Polina Kalsina - master of sports of international class, three-time champion of Russia in cross-country skiing

== Literature ==
- Нижнетагильский технологический. 60 лет: 1944—2004 / ред.-сост. Д. В. Вендер — Екатеринбург: СВ-96, 2004. — 200 с.
- Нижнетагильское образование на рубеже веков: мат-лы городской научн.-практ. конф. / Нижний Тагил, 2000.
- Уральский государственный технический университет : 1920—1995 гг.: Исторический очерк / отв. ред. Б. В. Личман. — Екатеринбург : УГТУ, 1995. — 352 с. — ISBN 5-230-17188-X

== Sources ==
- "оф.сайт".
- "Нижнетагильский технологический институт отметил 75-летие". Администрация города Нижний Тагил.
- "Этапы большого пути". История Нижнего Тагила от основания до наших дней.
