= Cherepanov =

Cherepanov as a surname may refer to

- Alexander Andreyevich Cherepanov (1837–1886), Russian general
- Aleksandr Cherepanov (general) (1895–1984), Soviet general
- Alexander Leonidovich Cherepanov (born 1967), Russian general
- Alexei Cherepanov (1989–2008), Russian ice hockey player
- Sergey Cherepanov (born 1986), Kazakhstani cross-country skier
- Yefim Alekseyevich Cherepanov (1774–1842) and Miron Yefimovich Cherepanov (1803–1849), Russian inventors and industrial engineers, father and son
