= Lis'ya Mountain =

Mountain in Russia

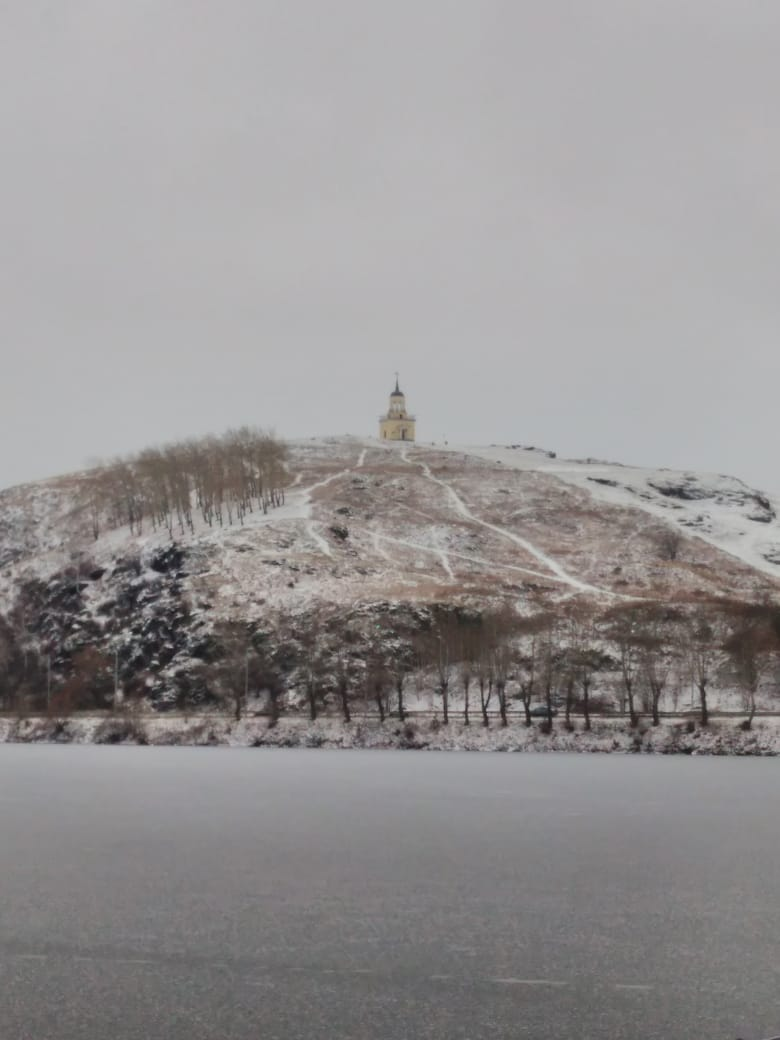

Highest point
- Elevation: 265.1 m (870 ft)
- Coordinates: 57°54′00″N 59°56′48″E

Geography
- Location: Nizhny Tagil, Russia
- Parent range: Ural Mountains

Lis'ya (Russian: Лисья гора, "Fox Mountain") or Lysaya (Russian: Лысая гора, "Bald Mountain") is a mountain located in the center of the city Nizhny Tagil, Sverdlovsk Oblast, Russia). It is a landmark of the city.

== Description ==
Lis'ya mountain is located near the Tagil pond. On the top of the mountain one can see a watchtower. Near the mountain there is the former Nizhny Tagil iron and steel plant established by Akinfiy Demidov in the 18th century. Now it is a museum dedicated to the history of manufacturing process. At the bottom of the mountain a monument to metallurgists has been erected. Furthermore, two streets, namely Beregovaya-Udarnaya Street and Cheluskintsev Street, meet in the centre of the city near the mountain.

There is no exact information why Lis'ya mountain got its name. One theory is that there were many foxes here, and other theory is that the mountain got its name due to smoke that the Iron and Steel Plant has been emitting from its chimneys and that looked like foxtails. The alternative name of the mountain, namely Lisaya (Bald), is related to the fact that the mountain was forested in the past. But the woods were gone.

Lis'ya mountain with the watchtower on the top is a landmark of the city of Nizhny Tagil. As in the olden days, Lis'ya mountain is still popular place for walking and having a rest. It offers picturesque views of the city.

Today, there is a museum in the watchtower that was recognized as the smallest museum of Russia. Together with this watchtower, Lis'ya mountain belongs to the Nizhny Tagil Museum Reserve Gornozavodskoy Ural (Горнозаводской Урал (Metallurgical Ural)). Furthermore, the watchtower is protected as an architectural monument and is considered the cultural heritage site of Ural and Russia.

== History ==
A full description of the Lis'ya mountain was given by the geographer and cartographer I.Ya. Krivoshchekov. In 1910, he wrote in the Slovar Verkhoturskogo uezda (Словарь Верхотурского уезда (Dictionary of Verkhoturye parish)) that Lis'ya mountain is 289 meters in height, is the summit of a volcano extinct 340-360 million years ago, and is composed of augite, diabase and porphyrite. Modern researchers confirm that the mountain consists of igneous rocks.

The wooden watchtower on the top of the Lis'ya mountain was established in the 18th century. In the early 19th century it was replaced with the stone watchtower. According to one of the far-fetched version it had been intended to protect local population from the nomads. But corresponding to more realistic version it served as a fire lookout tower. There are also versions that the tower was used as an observatory or even as a kind of lighthouse. Unfortunately, author of the tower project is unknown. However, on the cast-iron plate that secures one of the side of the tower you can find date of the construction: 1818. The tower has been used as the fire lookout tower: In the event of a fire towers watchmen rang the alarm bronze bell and warned town residents by hanging out the red lights made of big leather bags. In the mid-1830s near the watchtower an observatory was established for observing Halley's Comet (visible from Earth from 1835 to 1836). This observatory was a pavilion placed on the rotating platform. Nowadays, the only part of the observatory that survived is the bulky cast-iron pedestal buried in the rock. Since 3 October 1943, the watchtower has the status of architectural monument. It means that the watchtower should be renovated but not rebuilt.

From the 1990s to the 2000s, the watchtower was dilapidated. The walls of the tower were painted several times, but the interior space was in highly deteriorated condition. To avoid acts of vandalism, windows and doors of the tower were covered with iron sheets. As part of the project Samotsvetnoe koltso Urala (Самоцветное кольцо Урала (The Semiprecious Ring of Ural)), the extensive reconstruction works began on 30 March 2015. This project included complete improvement of the entire recreation area on the Lisya mountain, the overhaul of the watchtower, and the construction of an observation deck.

On 8 August 2015, Lis'ya mountain was completely renovated, and surrounding areas including all facilities were put in order. After that they became part of Museum Reserve Gornozavodskoy Ural. From the root of the mountain, a sidewalk was paved from the parking space to the observation tower. Also, several stone benches were installed. On the top of the mountain, around the watchtower, viewing platform was also paved. Cupola with spire on the tower was replaced with the copper one. Roof got covered with copper as well. On the spire you can see weather vane in the form of flying archangel Michael that was made by the Nizhny Tagil sculptor Aleksander Ivanov. At entrance to the tower there is Empire style portico. The tower was completely repainted, columns were whitewashed, and near the exit onto the roof the cast-iron fence was installed on the second floor of the building and on the third floor (bell-gable). This fence originally used in the 18th century was identical with Kasli iron products. In addition, the tower door was made of cast iron in old traditional Russian style. On the walls there were old flashlights. Near the tower the small cast-iron cannon from the 16th century was put on the small stepped platform. Interior of the watchtower was also restored. Inside the tower there was a small museum exposition with an area of only 13 m² presenting the history of the city and the tower, including bells, high reliefs, personal things of the tower's employees from different historical periods and a model of the Nithny Tagil watchtower in the 18th century. Besides that, old cast-iron winding stair leading to the roof and bell-gable was renovated.

The city's landmark was inaugurated by the mayor of Nizhny Tagil Sergey Nosov in the presence of the regional officials, the Nizhny Tagil Orthodox Bishop Innokentiy, and the citizens. As of 8 August 2015, the Lis'ya mountain is a part of the tourist route Samotsvetnoe koltso Urala.
