= Nizhny Tagil =

City in Sverdlovsk Oblast, Russia

Nizhny Tagil Нижний Тагил
- City
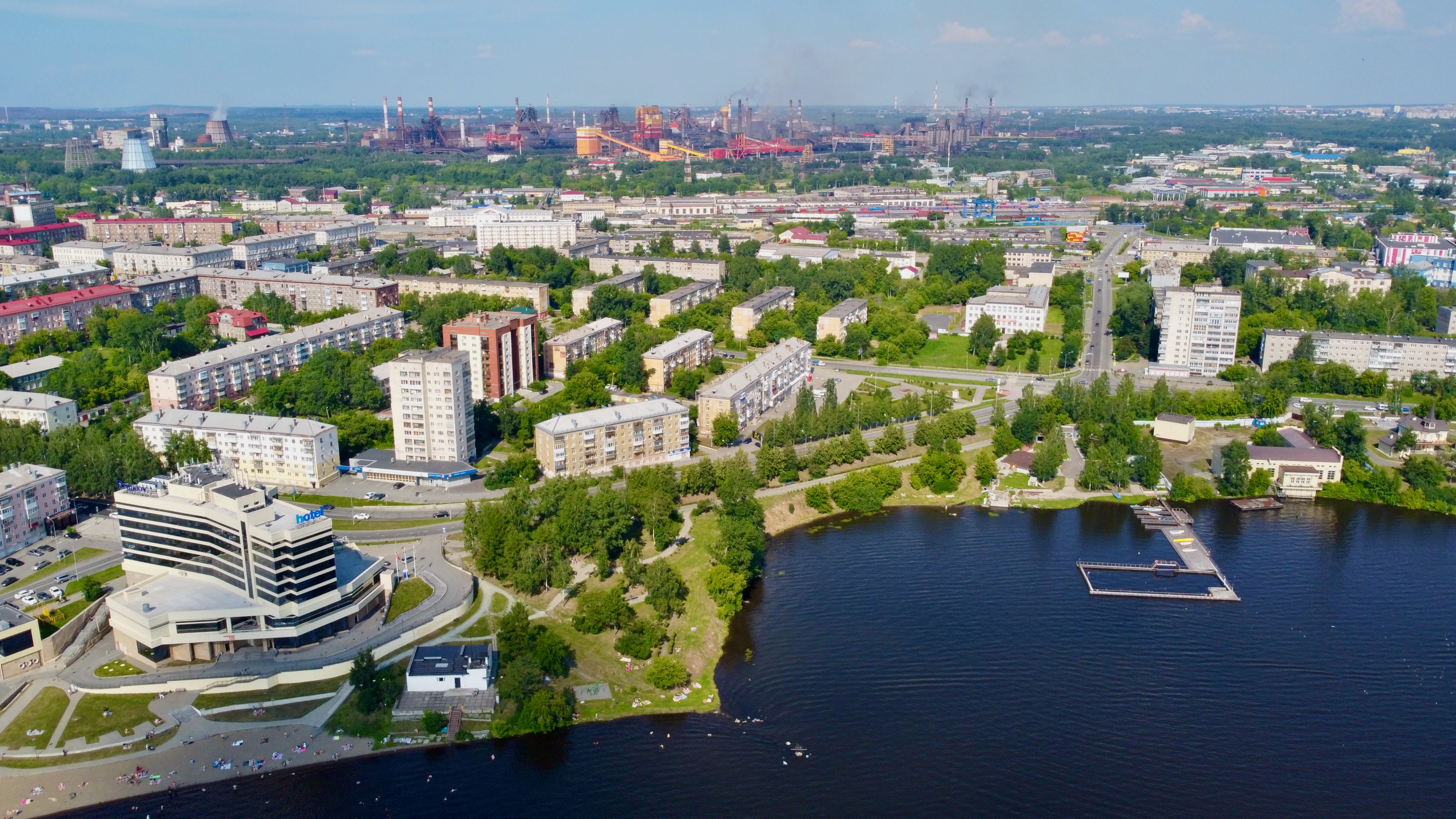
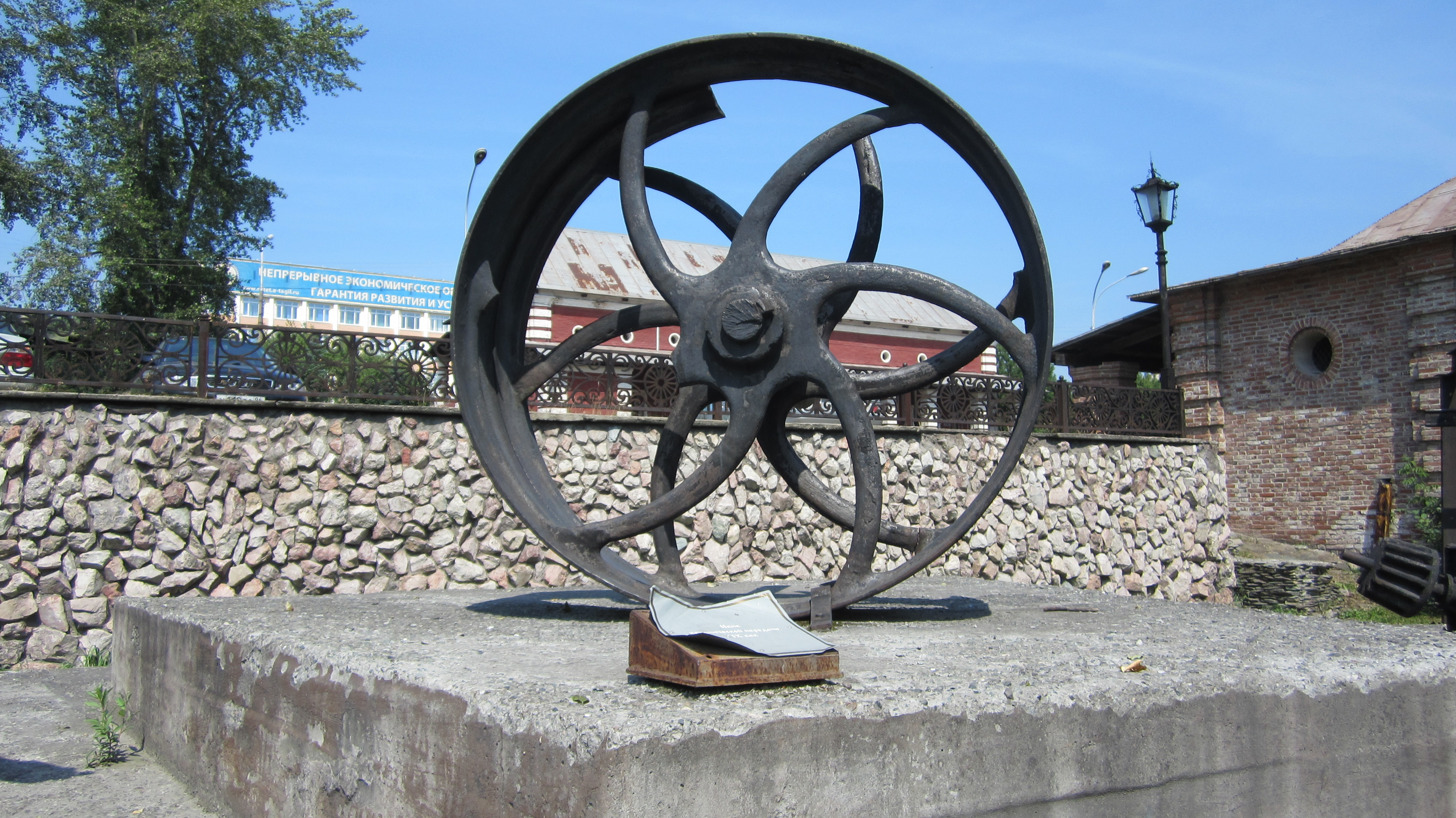
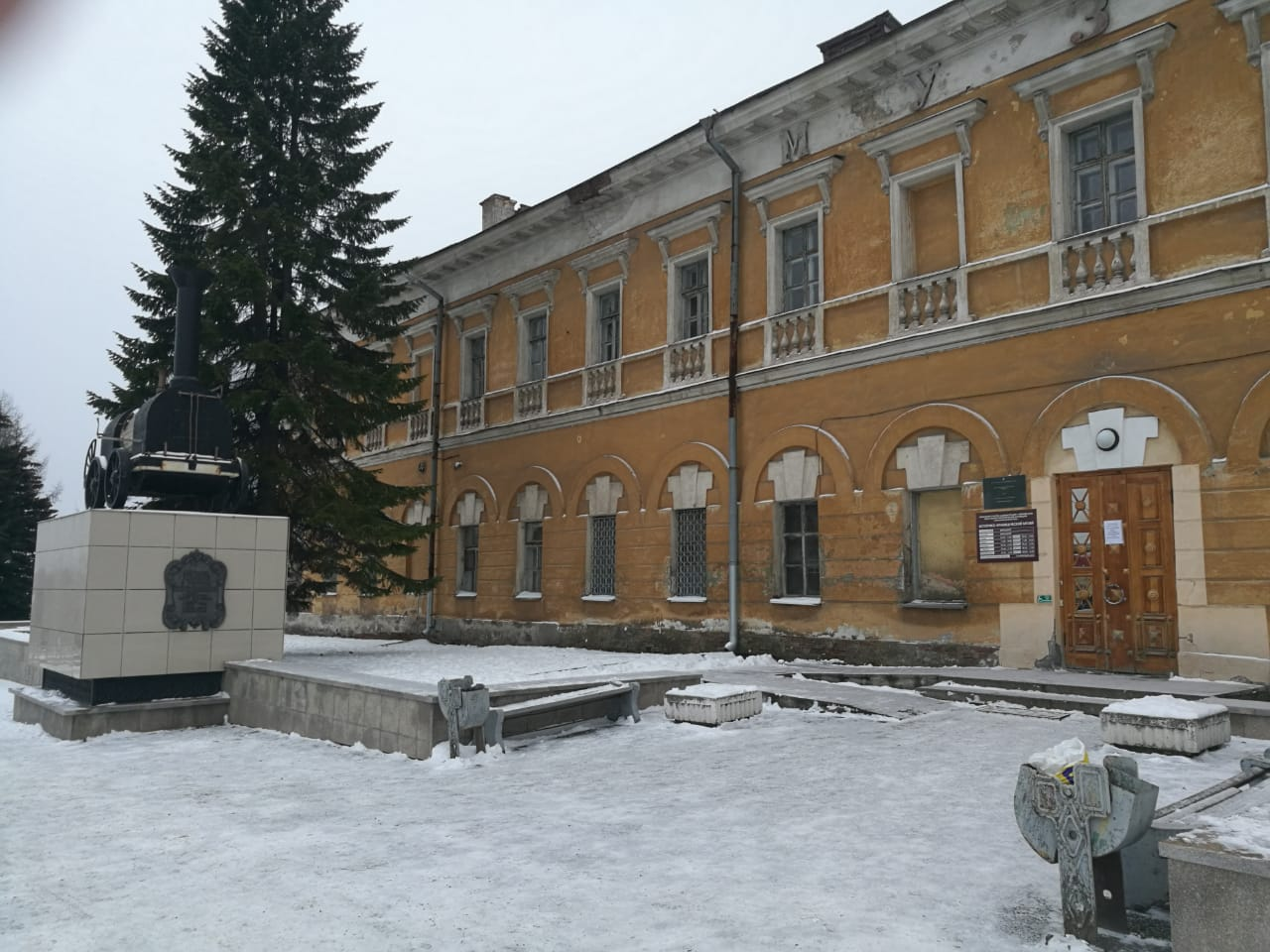
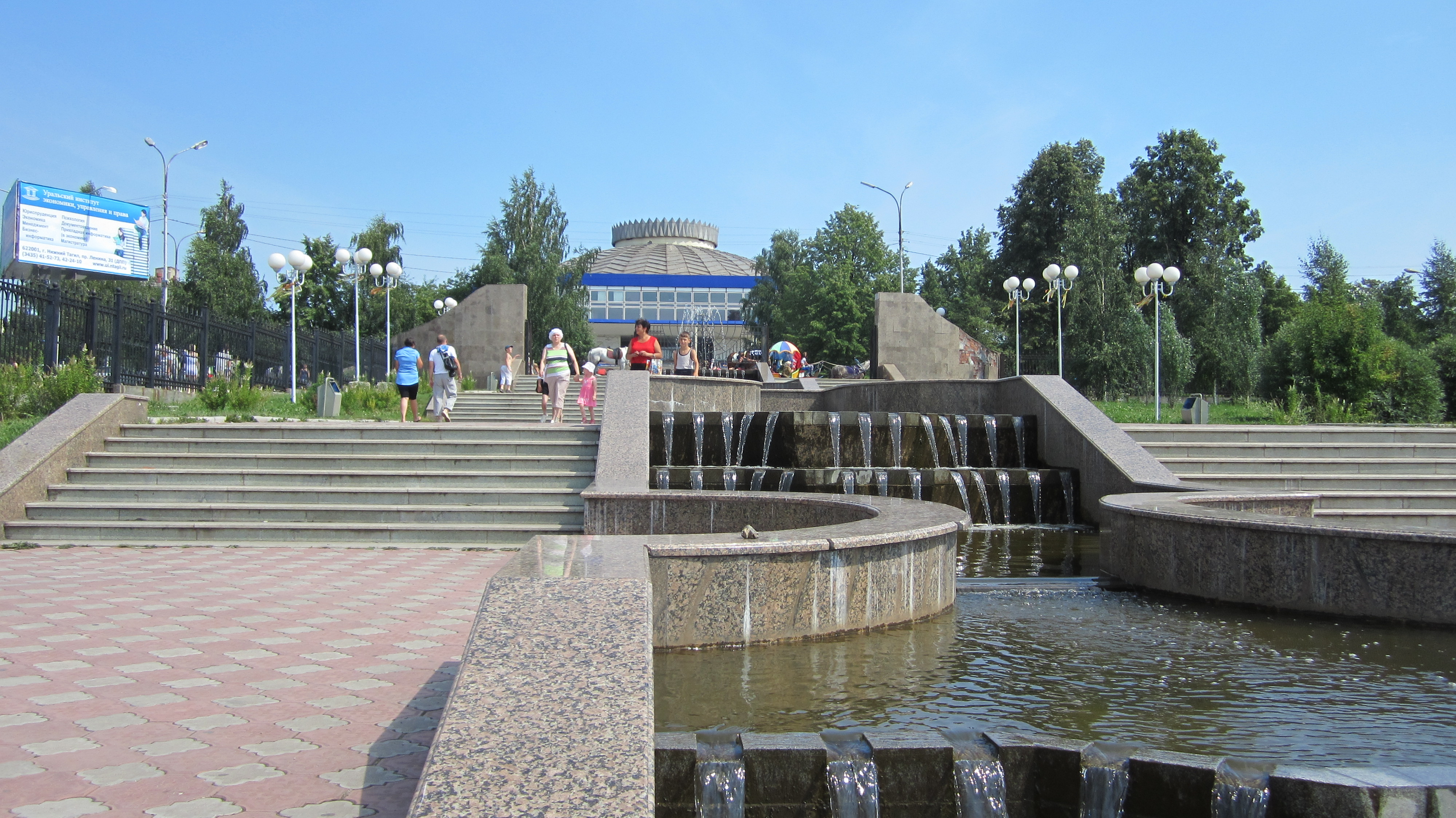
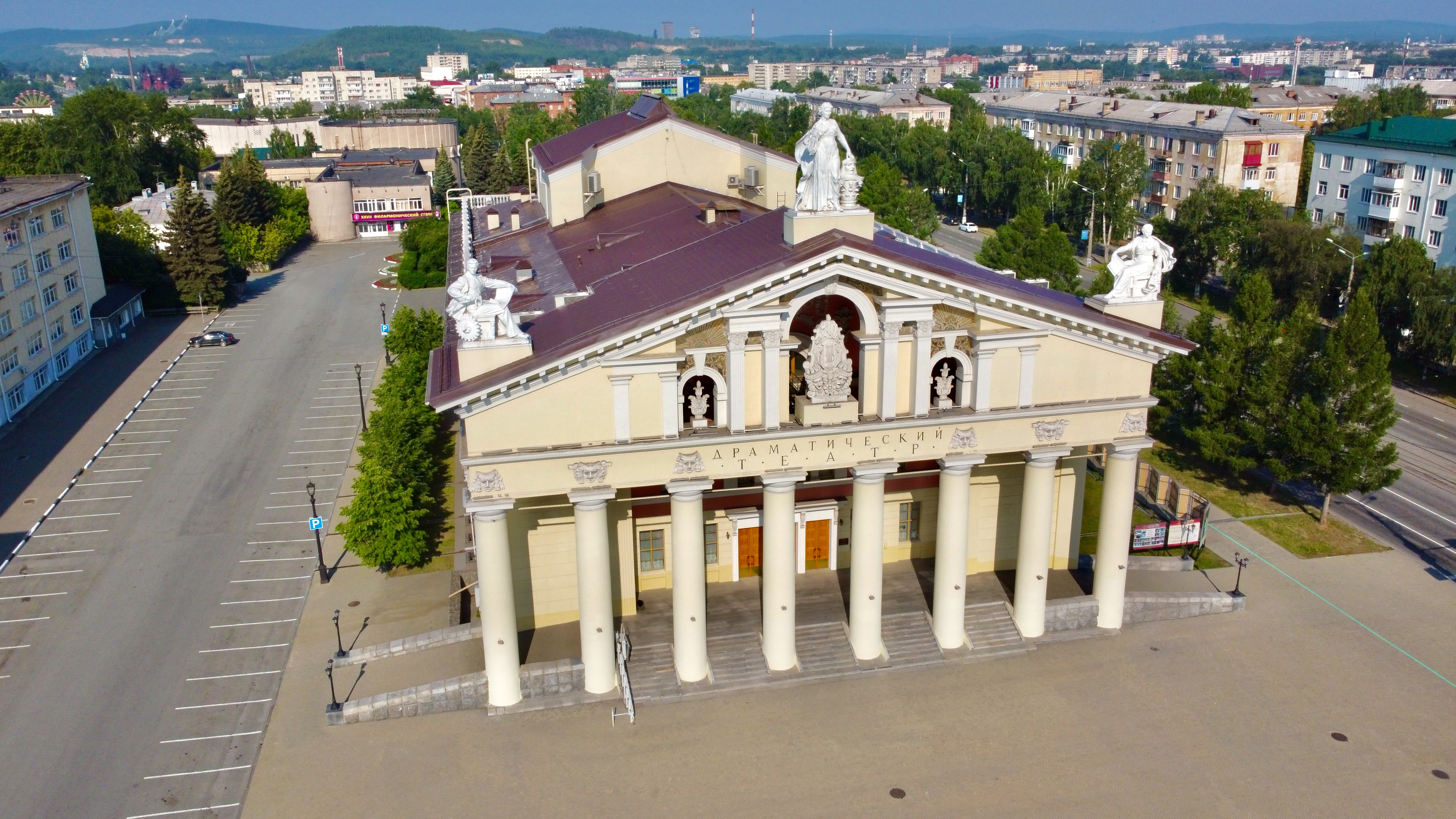
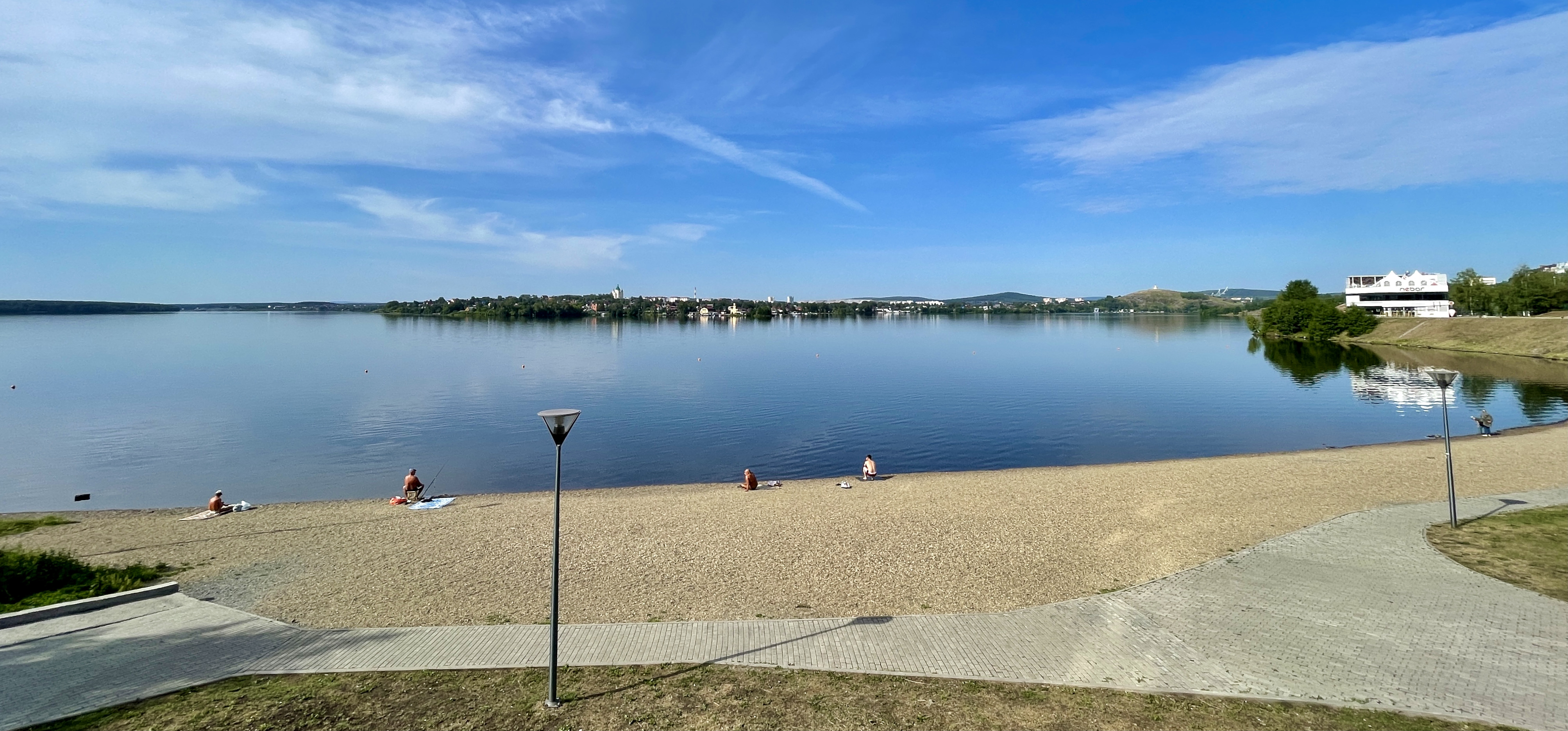
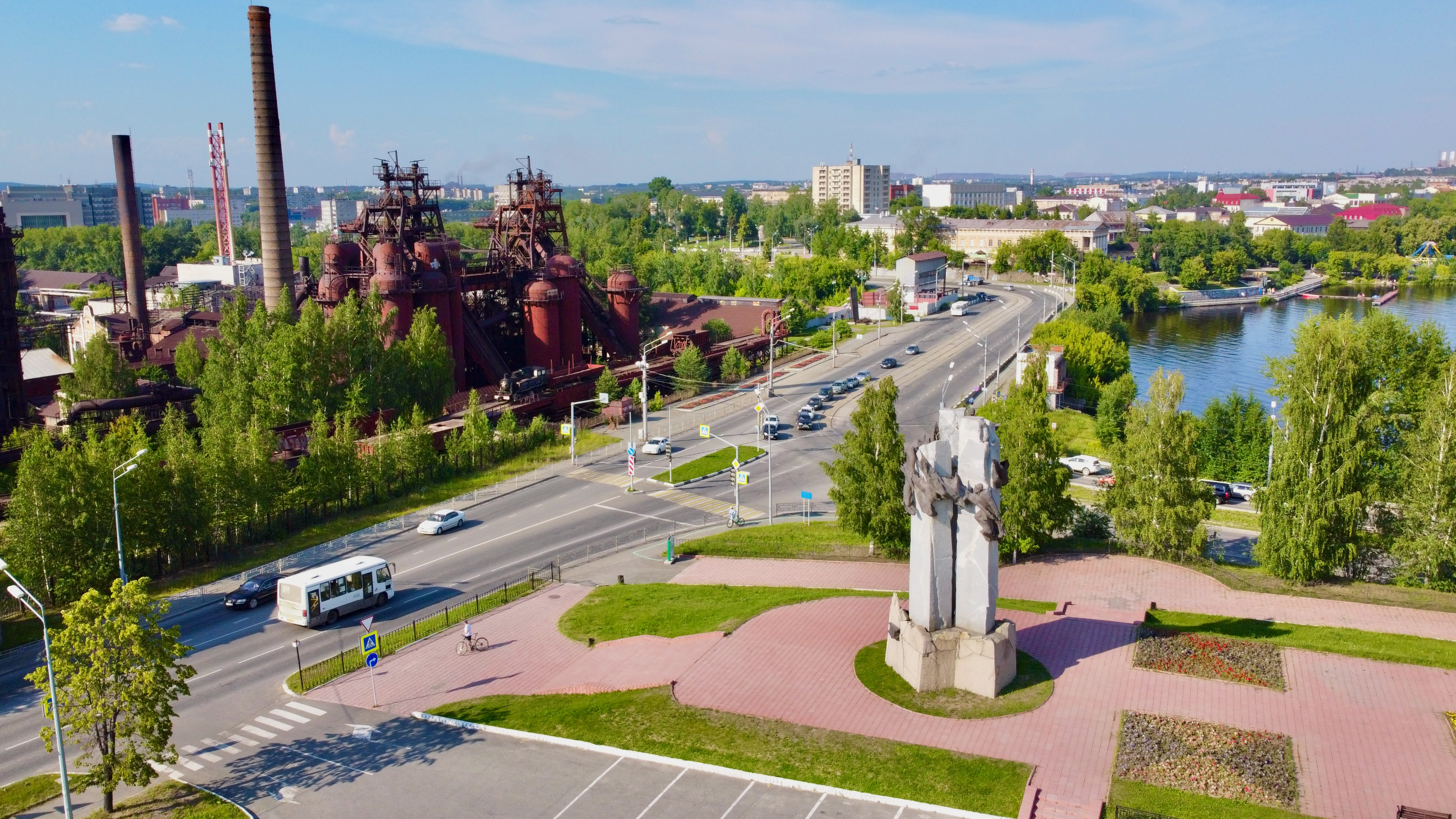
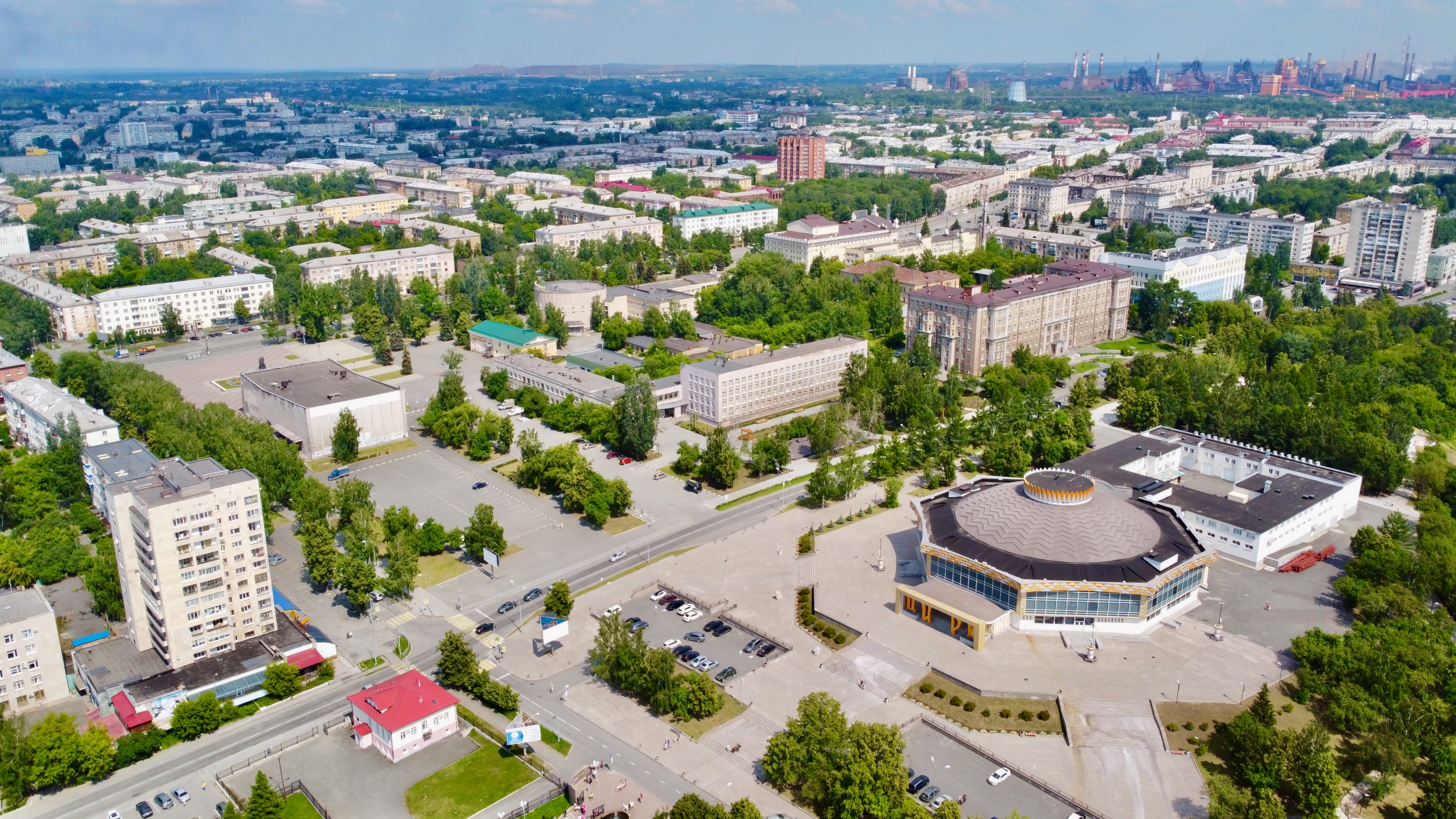

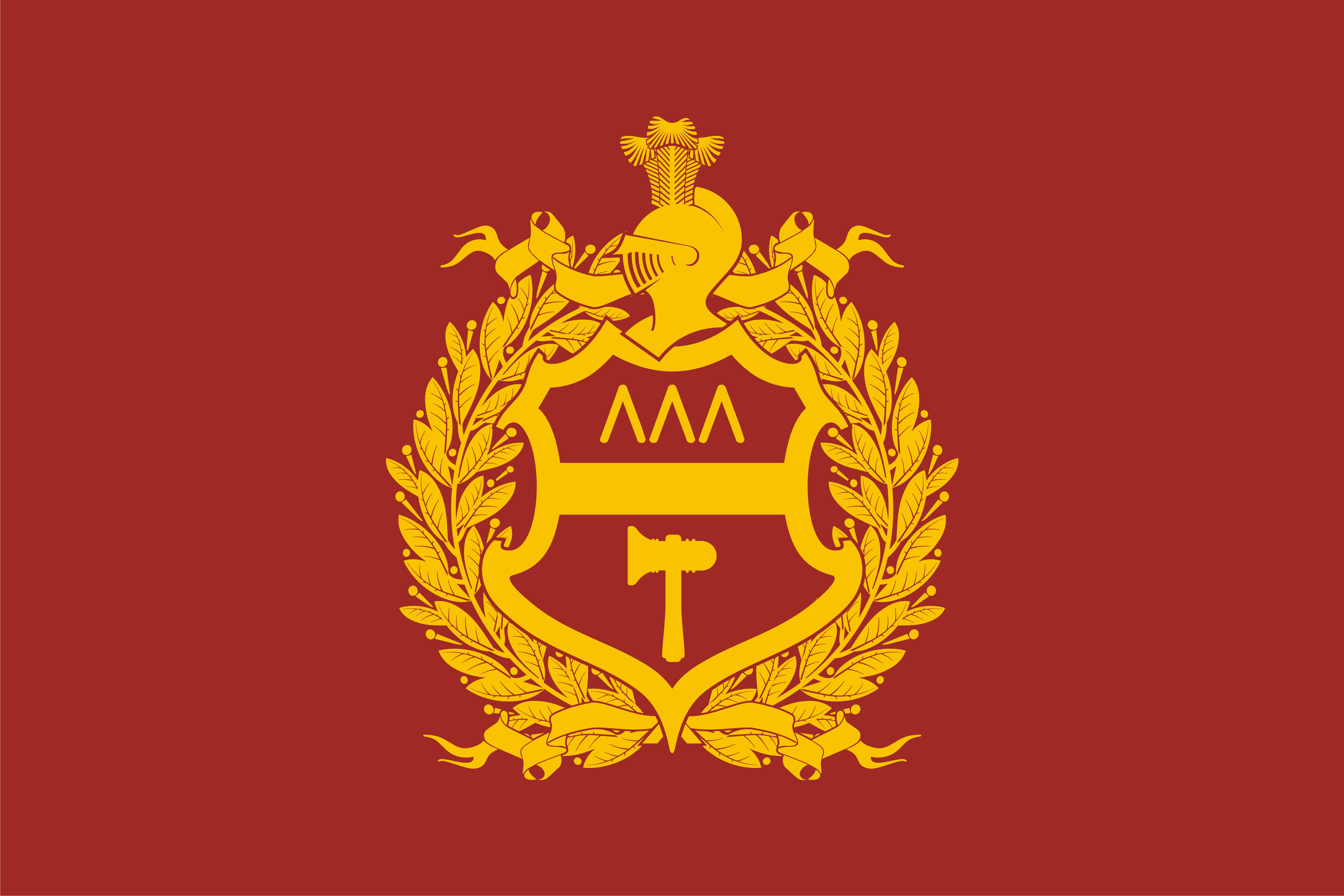
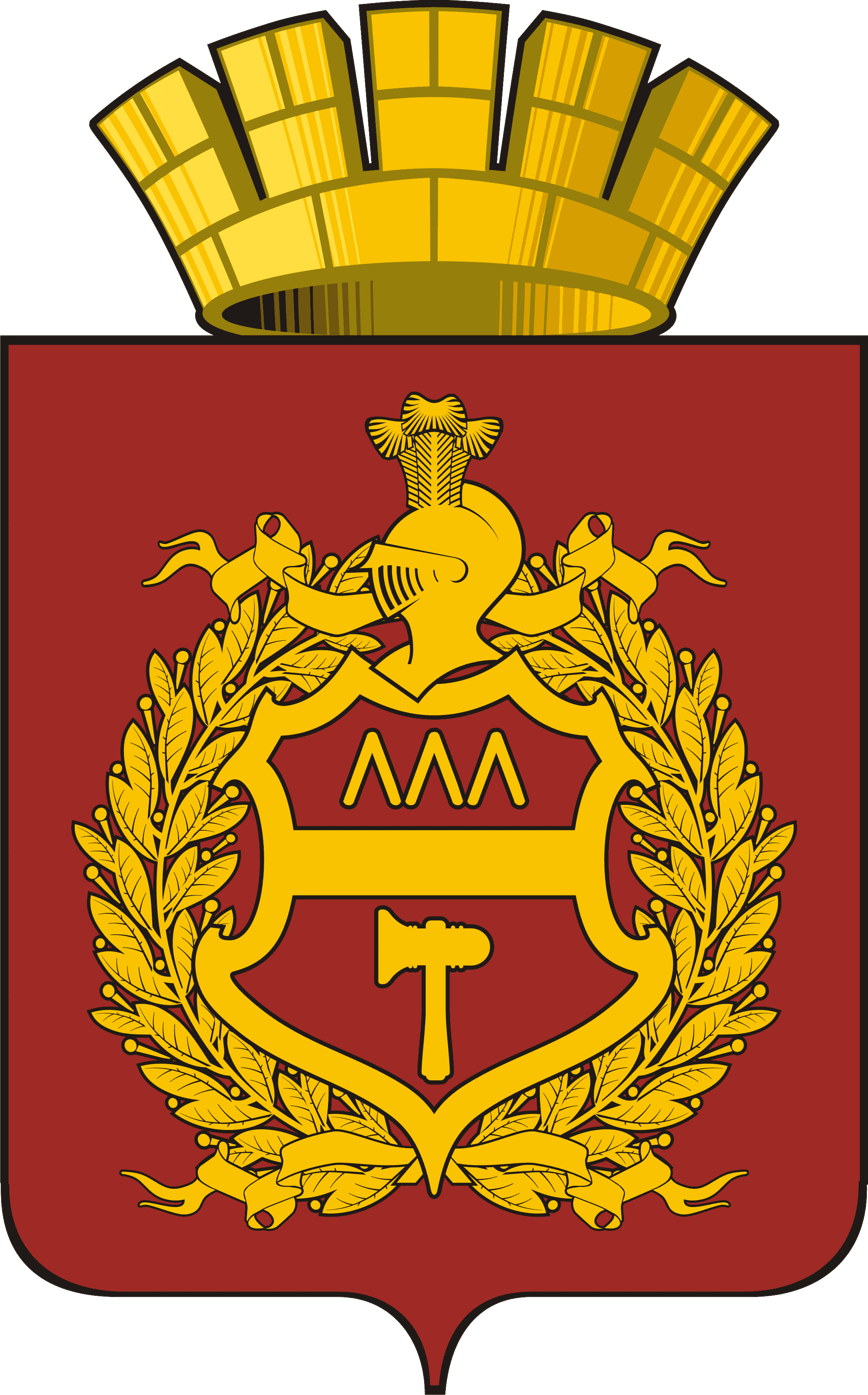
- Flag Coat of arms
- Interactive map of Nizhny Tagil
- Location of Nizhny Tagil Nizhny Tagil (Sverdlovsk Oblast)
- Coordinates: 57°55′N 59°58′E
- Country: Russia
- Federal subject: Sverdlovsk Oblast
- Founded: 1722
- City status since: 1919

Government
  - Mayor: Vladislav Pinaev
- Elevation: 200 m (660 ft)

Population (2010 Census)
  - Total: 361,811
  - Estimate (2025): 328,157 (−9.3%)
  - Rank: 48th in 2010

Administrative status
  - Subordinated to: City of Nizhny Tagil
  - Capital of: Prigorodny District, City of Nizhny Tagil

Municipal status
  - Urban okrug: Nizhny Tagil Urban Okrug
  - Capital of: Nizhny Tagil Urban Okrug
- Time zone: UTC+5 (MSK+2)
- Postal code: 622002
- Dialing code: +7 3435
- OKTMO ID: 65751000001
- Website: ntagil.org

Nizhny Tagil (Russian: Нижний Тагил, IPA: [ˈnʲiʐnʲɪj tɐˈgʲil]) is a city in Sverdlovsk Oblast, Russia, located 25 kilometers (16 mi) east of the boundary between Asia and Europe.

== Demographics ==
Historical population
Year	Pop.	±%
1897	30,000	—
1926	39,000	+30.0%
1939	160,000	+310.3%
1959	338,501	+111.6%
1970	378,410	+11.8%
1979	398,146	+5.2%
1989	439,521	+10.4%
2002	390,498	−11.2%
2010	361,811	−7.3%
2021	338,966	−6.3%
Source: Census data

== History ==
The history of Nizhny Tagil dates back to the mid-16th century, when the Stroganovs received the right to possess land by the Kama and Chusovaya basins. In 1579 they founded the first settlement, the Utkin sloboda, by the river Utka, the mouth of Chusoya. Fateyevo, the first Russian village in the Tagil region, was founded in 1665.

In 1696, by the order of Tsar Peter the Great, the Vysokogorsky iron ore quarry was opened. Voevode Dmitry Protasyev was elected to search for iron and magnetic ores. The deposits were particularly rich, and included lodes of pure magnetic iron. The surrounding landscape provided everything needed for a successful and productive mining and smelting operation — rivers for transport, forests for fuel, and suitable climate. Several years later, the Tsar introduced in Russia a special administration on mining.

Over the following decades, the city developed as one of the early centers of Russian industrialization, and it has been a major producer of cast iron and steel. The town of Nizhny Tagil, home of the factory Uralvagonzavod, is also known for its production of Soviet tanks, including the famous T-34; nearly every other T-34 was manufactured in Nizhny Tagil.

The first Russian steam locomotive was constructed there in 1833, and the father-and-son engineers who developed it, Yefim and Miron Cherepanov, were in 1956 commemorated by an 8-meter (26 ft) bronze statue (executed by sculptor A. S. Kondratyev and architect A. V. Sotnikov) which stands in the center of the Theatrical Square in the heart of downtown.

According to some sources, the copper for the skin of the Statue of Liberty was mined and refined in Nizhny Tagil. However, research by Bell Laboratories in New Jersey, USA, suggests that the Visnes mine in Norway is the most likely source.

== Geography ==
Rivers and ponds take up one third of the city's territory. Nizhny Tagil spans 22 kilometers (14 mi) from north to south and 21 kilometers (13 mi) from east to west. The altitude of the city varies from 170 to 380 meters (560 to 1,250 ft).

The city is built around the extinct volcano Lis'ya Mountain. This mountain with a watchtower on its top is a symbol of the city. Another hill, Medved-Kamen, is located in the northern part of the city at an altitude of 288 meters (945 ft).

Neighboring cities include Yekaterinburg 130 kilometers (81 mi) to the south, Serov and Priobye in the north, Perm in the west, and Alapayevsk and Verkhnyaya Salda in the east.

=== Climate ===
The city features a subarctic climate (Köppen climate classification: Dfc) with mildly warm summers and very long and cold winters. Precipitation is mostly concentrated between late spring and early fall, peaking in the months of July and August. A freeze has been recorded for every month of the year.

Climate data for Nizhny Tagil (1949–2011)
Month	Jan	Feb	Mar	Apr	May	Jun	Jul	Aug	Sep	Oct	Nov	Dec	Year
Record high °C (°F)	11.1 (52.0)	11.1 (52.0)	30.2 (86.4)	30.0 (86.0)	33.9 (93.0)	33.9 (93.0)	34.6 (94.3)	37.2 (99.0)	29.4 (84.9)	22.6 (72.7)	12.3 (54.1)	4.9 (40.8)	37.2 (99.0)
Mean daily maximum °C (°F)	−11.5 (11.3)	−9.6 (14.7)	−0.8 (30.6)	8.1 (46.6)	15.5 (59.9)	20.8 (69.4)	22.7 (72.9)	19.4 (66.9)	13.2 (55.8)	4.6 (40.3)	−4.6 (23.7)	−9.7 (14.5)	5.7 (42.3)
Daily mean °C (°F)	−14.7 (5.5)	−13.7 (7.3)	−5.2 (22.6)	3.0 (37.4)	9.7 (49.5)	15.1 (59.2)	17.2 (63.0)	14.2 (57.6)	8.6 (47.5)	1.4 (34.5)	−7.2 (19.0)	−12.4 (9.7)	1.3 (34.3)
Mean daily minimum °C (°F)	−19.0 (−2.2)	−18.7 (−1.7)	−10.8 (12.6)	−2.8 (27.0)	2.8 (37.0)	8.1 (46.6)	10.8 (51.4)	8.6 (47.5)	3.7 (38.7)	−2.0 (28.4)	−10.7 (12.7)	−16.3 (2.7)	−3.9 (25.0)
Record low °C (°F)	−45.0 (−49.0)	−42.0 (−43.6)	−36.1 (−33.0)	−27.2 (−17.0)	−12.8 (9.0)	−5.0 (23.0)	0.0 (32.0)	−2.6 (27.3)	−7.8 (18.0)	−27.0 (−16.6)	−38.9 (−38.0)	−46.0 (−50.8)	−46.0 (−50.8)
Average precipitation mm (inches)	32.5 (1.28)	27.6 (1.09)	24.0 (0.94)	32.9 (1.30)	54.7 (2.15)	55.6 (2.19)	95.9 (3.78)	78.5 (3.09)	57.4 (2.26)	37.3 (1.47)	27.7 (1.09)	25.4 (1.00)	549.5 (21.63)
Average precipitation days	18.2	14.5	16.7	11.9	13.3	13.6	9.1	12.6	13.2	17.4	20.6	17.8	178.9
Average relative humidity (%)	77.0	72.9	70.2	63.9	63.3	71.3	72.6	78.2	79.4	78.5	79.3	78.5	73.8
Mean monthly sunshine hours	49.6	89.6	124.0	201.0	235.6	243.0	282.1	201.5	132.0	71.3	33.0	34.1	1,696.8
Source: Climatebase

== Administrative and municipal structure ==
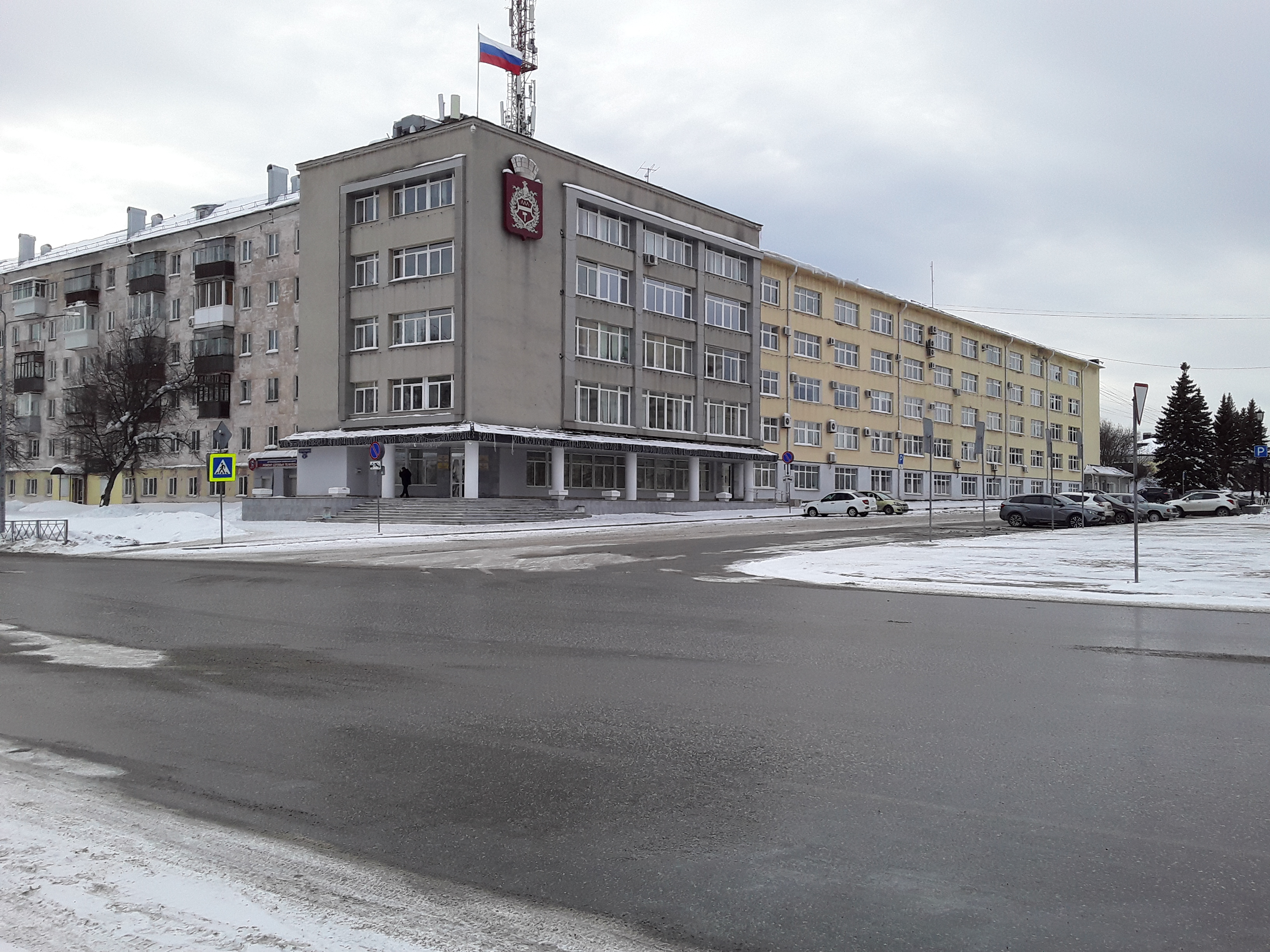
Nizhny Tagil Administration building

Within the framework of the administrative divisions, Nizhny Tagil serves as the administrative center of Prigorodny District, even though it is not a part of it. As an administrative division, it is, together with twenty-three rural localities, incorporated separately as the City of Nizhny Tagil—an administrative unit with the status equal to that of the districts. As a municipal division, the City of Nizhny Tagil is incorporated as Nizhny Tagil Urban Okrug.

The city is divided into three city districts: Leninsky, encompassing the city center and Nizhnetagilsky Pond; Tagilstroyevsky, a comparatively small section at the north part of town; and Dzerzhinsky, a sizable section to the east of the city center principally consisting of apartment buildings and other residences.

The city is governed by four local authorities:

- The Nizhny Tagil City Duma (city council)
- The Mayor of Nizhny Tagil
- The Administration of Nizhny Tagil
- The Audit Chamber of Nizhny Tagil

The city's government structure was defined in the charter of a municipal unit, which was passed on 24 November 2005. The city's highest official is the mayor elected by the population of Nizhny Tagil for a term of 5 years in office. The executive is foremost the Administration of Nizhny Tagil, the head of which is the mayor. The legislature agency is the City Duma (city council), composed of 28 deputies, which are chosen via MPP for a term of 5 years in office.

== Government ==
Former mayors:

1. Nikolay Didenko 2006-?
2. Valentina Isayeva 2008-?
3. Sergey Nosov 2012-?

== Economy ==
In 2015, a large portion of the land within the bounds of the city is dominated by the facilities of the factories located in this industrial city.

Nizhny Tagil is an industrial center of the Middle Urals. Highly power-intensive industries such as ferrous metallurgy, engineering, chemistry, and metal working are well-developed in the city. A total of 606 manufacturing companies operate in Nizhny Tagil.

Nizhny Tagil Iron and Steel Plant (Nizhnetagilsky Metallurgichesky Kombinat, NTMK) is a leading Russian steel company.

Uralvagonzavod (UVZ) is the main producer of modern tanks on the territory of the former Soviet Union and Russia. It is the largest main battle tank manufacturer in the world. The T-72, T-90, and T-14 are produced in the city. As of 2016 an economic slowdown in Russia had resulted in diminished demand for civilian products such as train cars, but strong demand continued for tanks.

There are resources to manufacture medical tools for traumatology at the Nizhny Tagil medical tools plant.

=== Expo-Center ===
Nizhny Tagil is one of centers of exhibition activity in the Middle Urals. Nizhny Tagil Institute of Metals Testing was the host of the international exhibitions such as Ural Expo Arms / Russian Expo Arms, Russian Defense Expo (2001 and 2002).

=== Military ===
The 42nd Rocket Division of Strategic Rocket Forces is based in Nizhny Tagil, equipped with 36 Topol nuclear missiles.

== Culture ==
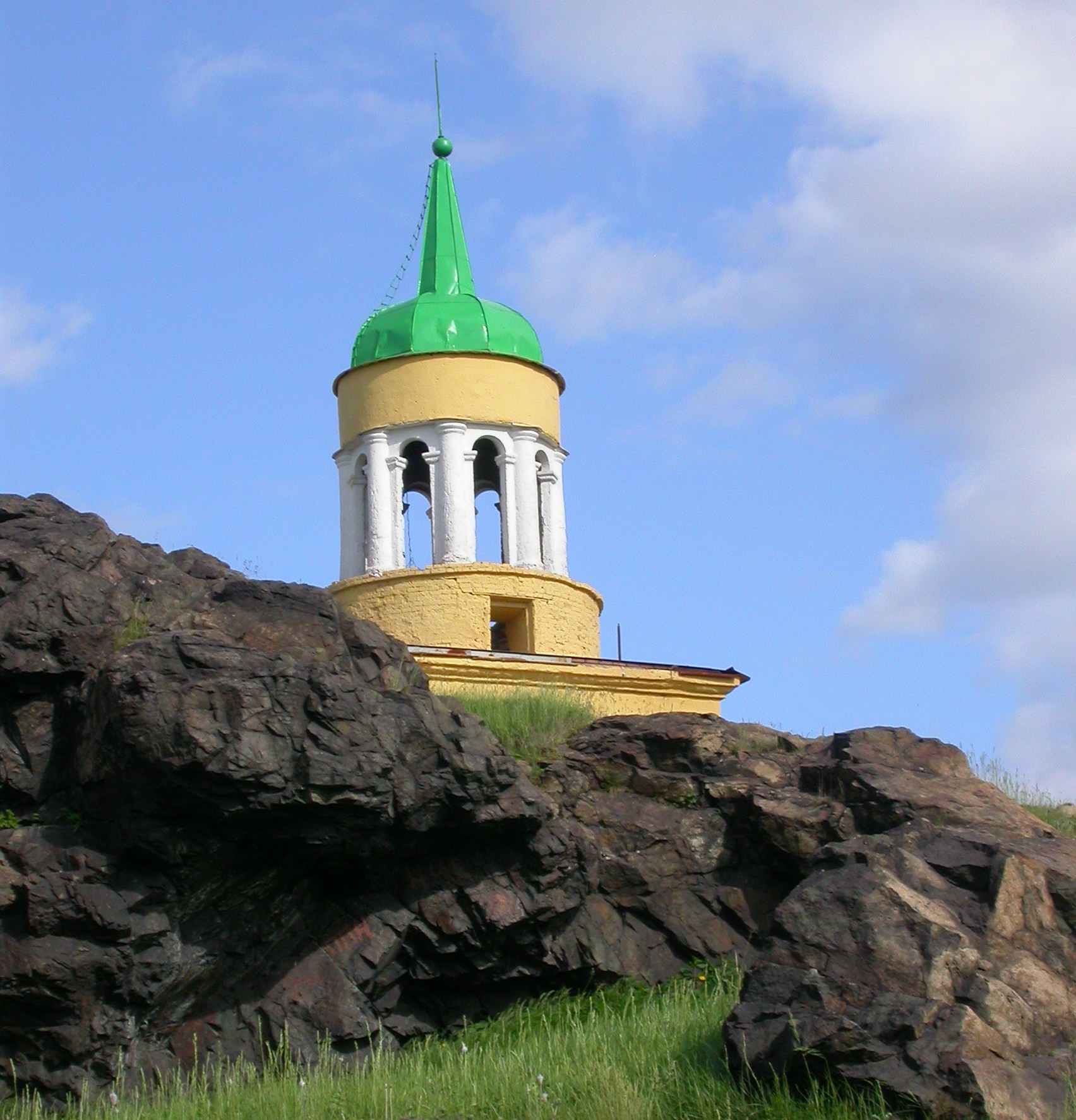
The watchtower atop the hill, a symbol of Nizhny Tagil

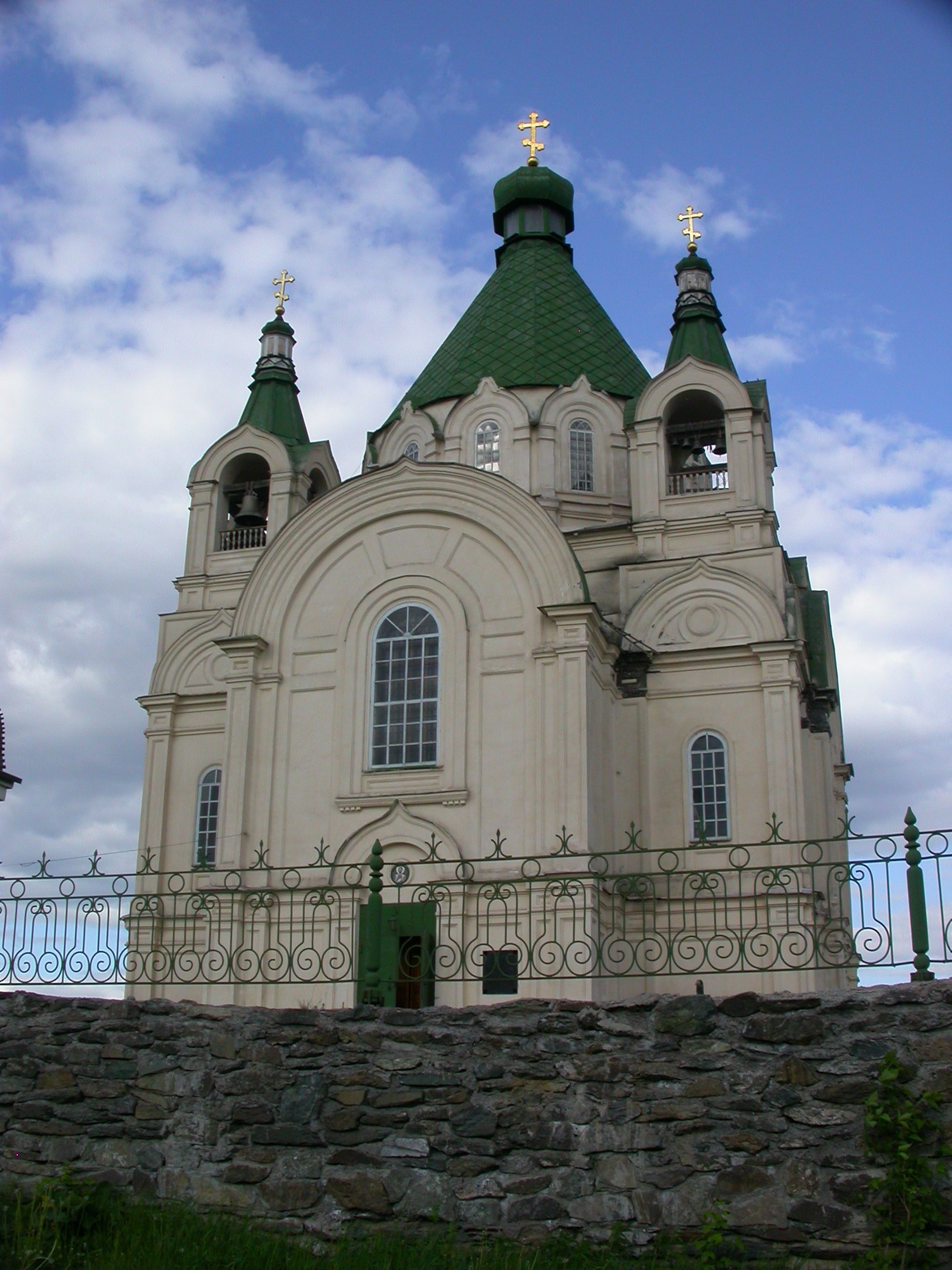
Alexander Nevsky Cathedral in Nizhny Tagil

The House of Demidov's initiatives in the area of culture helped to develop the Tagil community into the Urals' most important cultural center. In the 19th century, a library and the museum of natural history and antiquity were opened.

The city has a network of approximately 24 libraries servicing 75,000 readers every year.

Tagil museums include the old regional history museum, the museum of Fine Arts, and a number of new museums opened in the 1990s: the museum of tray painting art, the museum of lifestyle and handicrafts representing the starting point of a new ethnographic complex.

The Demidov Park, a new cultural and historical project, is planned to be built in the city. However, due to European sanctions against Russia, its foundation has been postponed.

Nizhny Tagil has been chosen to host international Urals' Industrial Heritage conferences and workshops. In 2003, during the 12th International Committee for the Conservation of the Industrial Heritage, a charter was signed for the conservation of Russian industrial heritage.

City theatrical life is represented by four theaters: the National D. N. Mamin-Sibiryak Academic Drama Theater, a puppet theater, a youth theater, and the actor department of Nizhny Tagil College of Arts, which has been training actors and actresses.

== Education ==
The oldest university is Nizhny Tagil State Socio-Educational Academy. The state educational academy operates 4 institutes, 13 faculties and 29 departments. There is post-graduate work in three fields: general education, the history of pedagogy and education, Russian history, the Russian language. In art and graphics department 2008 year launched five workshops in which students engage in decorative art. The academy has four modern sports halls. In summer, a wall is erected for climbing. There is a gymnasium and fitness room.

The Nizhny Tagil Technological Institute is located south-east of the city center.

== Sports ==
The city formerly had an association football team, FC Uralets Nizhny Tagil, which played in the Russian Second Division and was dissolved in 2006.

The city ice hockey team is Sputnik Nizhny Tagil, which played in the Russian Major League.

The bandy club Metallurg Nizhny Tagil plays in the 2nd highest division.

Nizhny Tagil is a host of several competitions in ski jumping World Cup.

== Public health ==
Medical care is provided in 29 medical care centers that employ 1,100 doctors and 4,500 assistants. Annually, up to 100,000 people are hospitalized, 28,000 surgeries are performed, and up to four million appointments are registered in the city medical care centers.

There is a Yekaterinburg branch of eye microsurgery in Nizhny Tagil. There is obstetrical care. There is a network of municipal and private pharmacies.

In 2015, pollution from factories was 600,000 short tons (540,000 t) annually. Respiratory rate of infection in children was 50% higher than the rest of the country. The city had the highest rate of stomach and lung cancer in the country.

== Transport ==
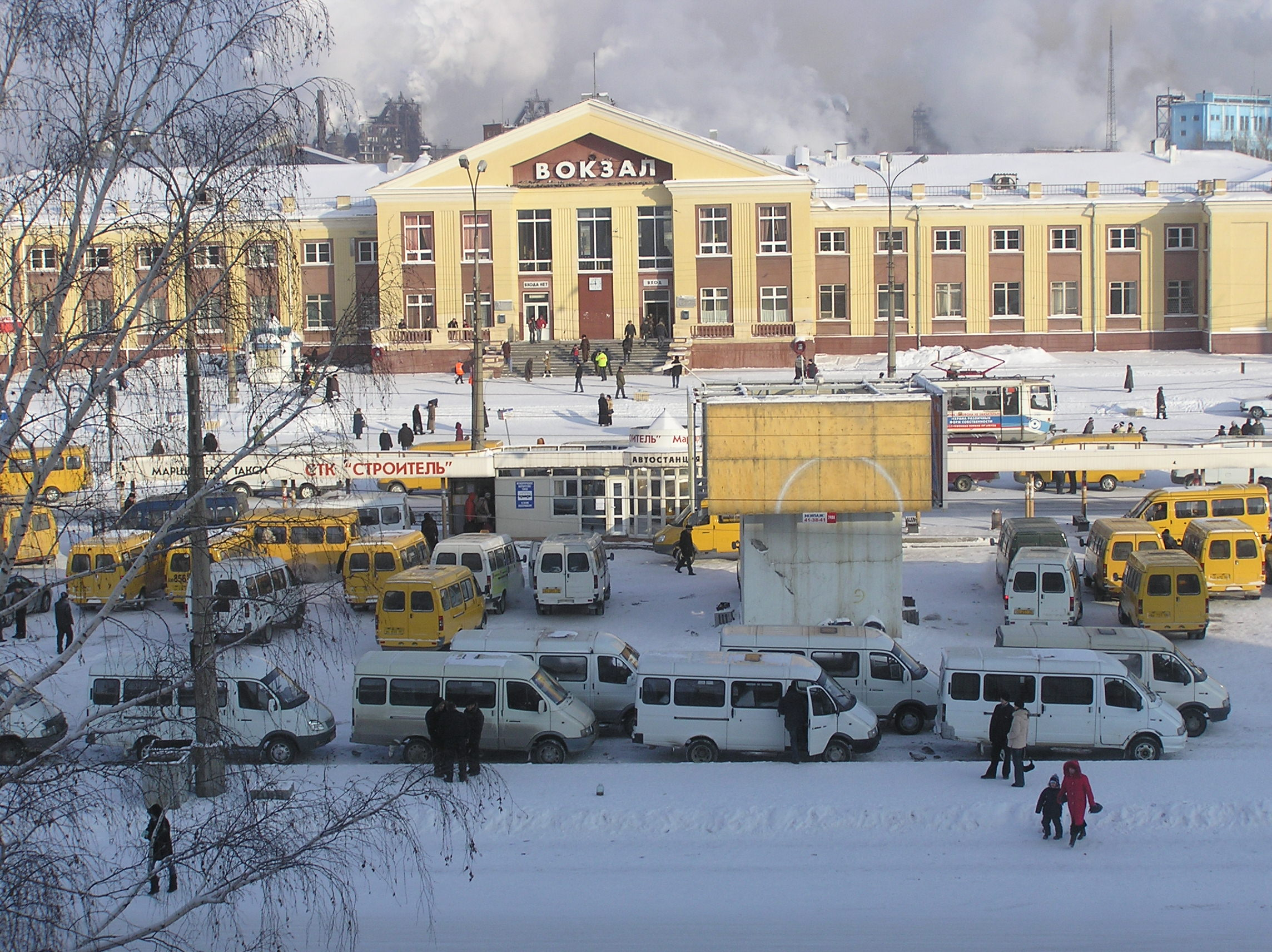
Nizhny Tagil railway station

Rail lines and highways connect the city to the rest of the country.

Near the city there is a Salka Aerodrome, located 17 kilometers (11 mi) northeast of the city. It was a military base until 1994. Then it became a civil airfield with main activities in Russian experimental aviation.

== People ==
Nizhny Tagil has been connected to the following personalities:

- Andrej Aliaksandraŭ (born 1978), Belarusian journalist, activist and political prisoner
- Valeri Brainin, poet, musicologist, President (from 2004 to 2014) of the Russian branch of the International Society for Music Education - a member of UNESCO
- Yefim Cherepanov, inventor and industrial engineer, constructor of the first Russian locomotive
- Miron Cherepanov (son of Yefim Cherepanov), inventor and industrial engineer, constructor of the first Russian locomotive
- Pavel Dorofeyev, hockey player, winger currently playing for the New York Rangers of the NHL, formerly with Металлург Магнитогорск (Metallurg Magnitogorsk) and ХК Трактор Челябинск (Traktor Chelyabinsk) of the KHL and the Vegas Golden Knights of the NHL
- Pavel Gayev, Soviet military intelligence officer, guards colonel
- Dmitry Larionov, slalom canoe champion
- Felix Lembersky, painter
- Vladislav Lomko, racing driver
- Konstantin Novoselov, 2010 Nobel Prize winner for his research on Graphene
- Bar Paly, Russian-Israeli model and actress
- Igor Radulov, hockey player, winger currently playing for Салават Юлаев (Salavat Yulaev Ufa) of the KHL
- Alexander Radulov, hockey player, winger currently playing for the Dallas Stars, formerly with Салават Юлаев (Salavat Yulaev Ufa) of the KHL (brother with Igor)
- Boris Rauschenbach, physicist and rocket engineer
- Sergei Shepelev, former Soviet national ice hockey team member
- Nikita Soshnikov, hockey player, winger currently playing for the St. Louis Blues organization; previously with the Toronto Maple Leafs of the NHL, formerly with the Toronto Marlies of the AHL and Moscow Oblast Atlant of the KHL
- Victor Starffin, baseball player
- Aron Zinshtein, painter
- Maya Khromykh, figure skater
- Volodar Murzin, chess grandmaster, reigning World Rapid Chess Champion

== Twin towns – sister cities ==
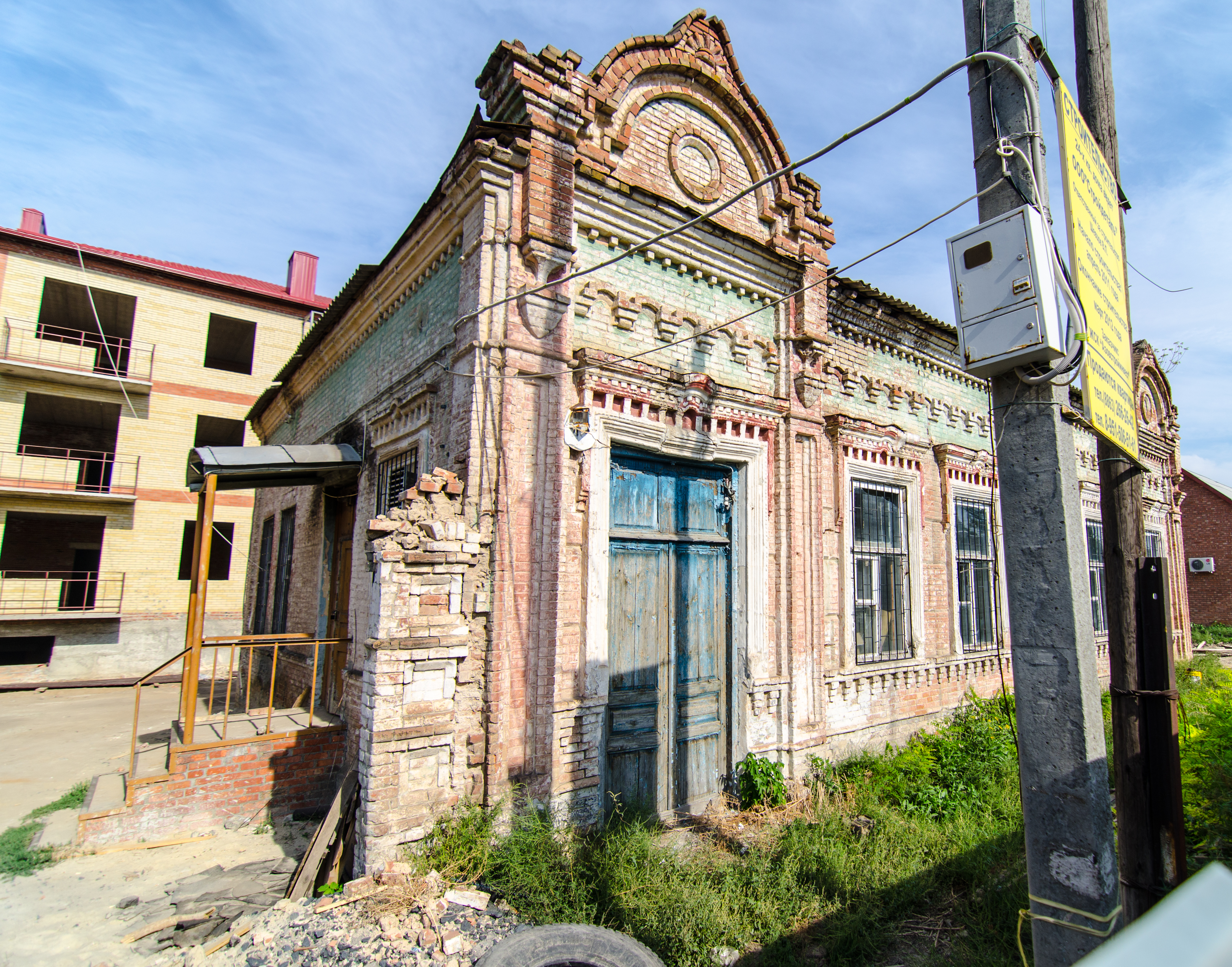
Site of the city's first town council

Nizhny Tagil is twinned with:

- Brest, Belarus
- Chattanooga, United States
- Františkovy Lázně, Czech Republic
- Novokuznetsk, Russia
- Yevpatoria, Russia

Former twin towns:

- Kryvyi Rih, Ukraine
- Cheb, Czech Republic
- Mariánské Lázně, Czech Republic

In 2022 the Czech cities of Cheb and Mariánské Lázně severed its ties with Nizhny Tagil in response to the 2022 Russian invasion of Ukraine.

== Gallery ==
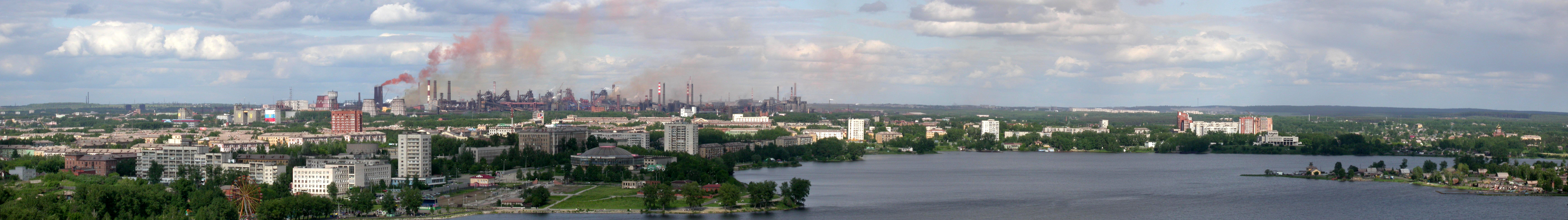
Panoramic view of Nizhniy Tagil

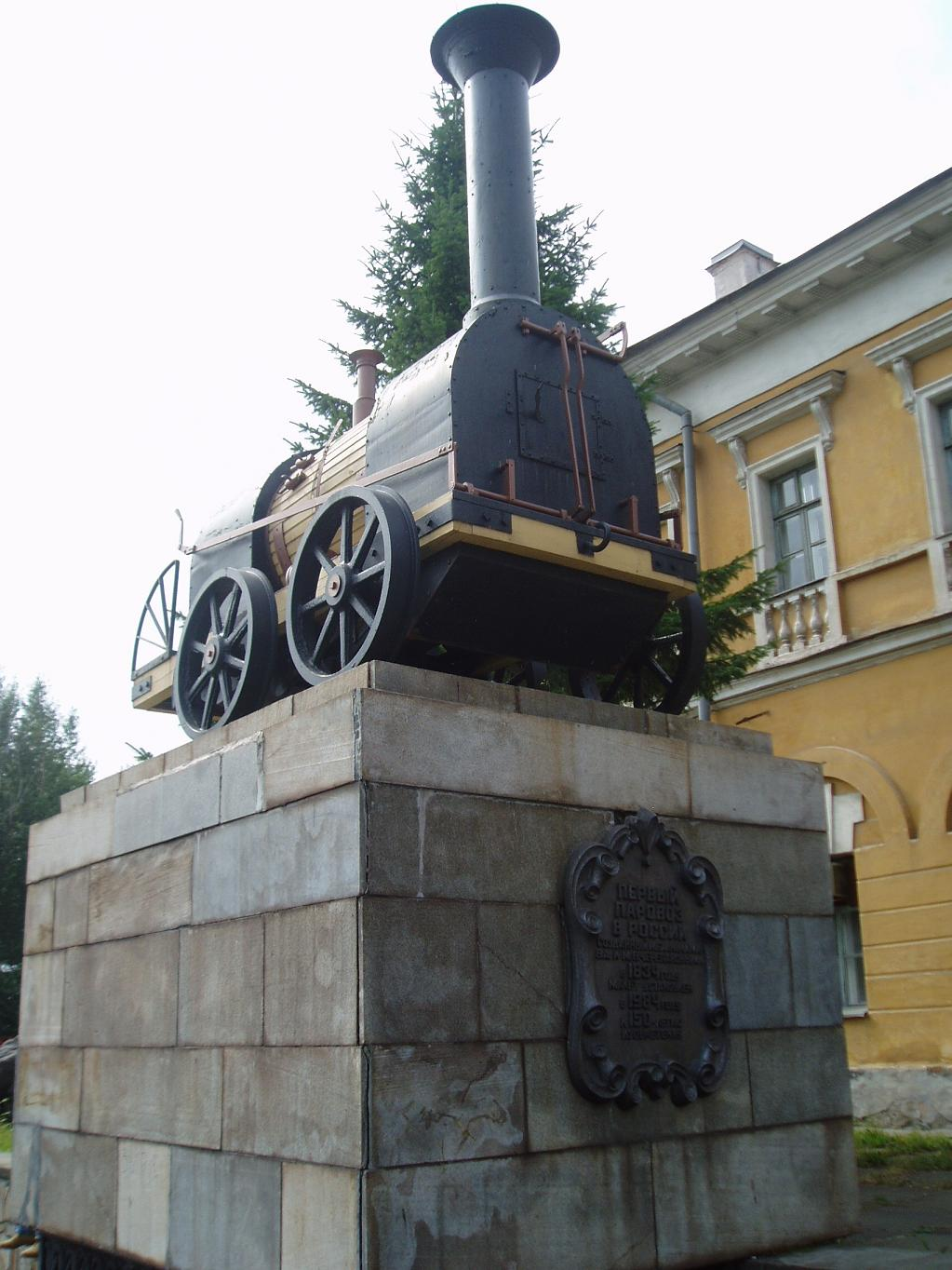
First Russian locomotive constructed in Nizhny Tagil

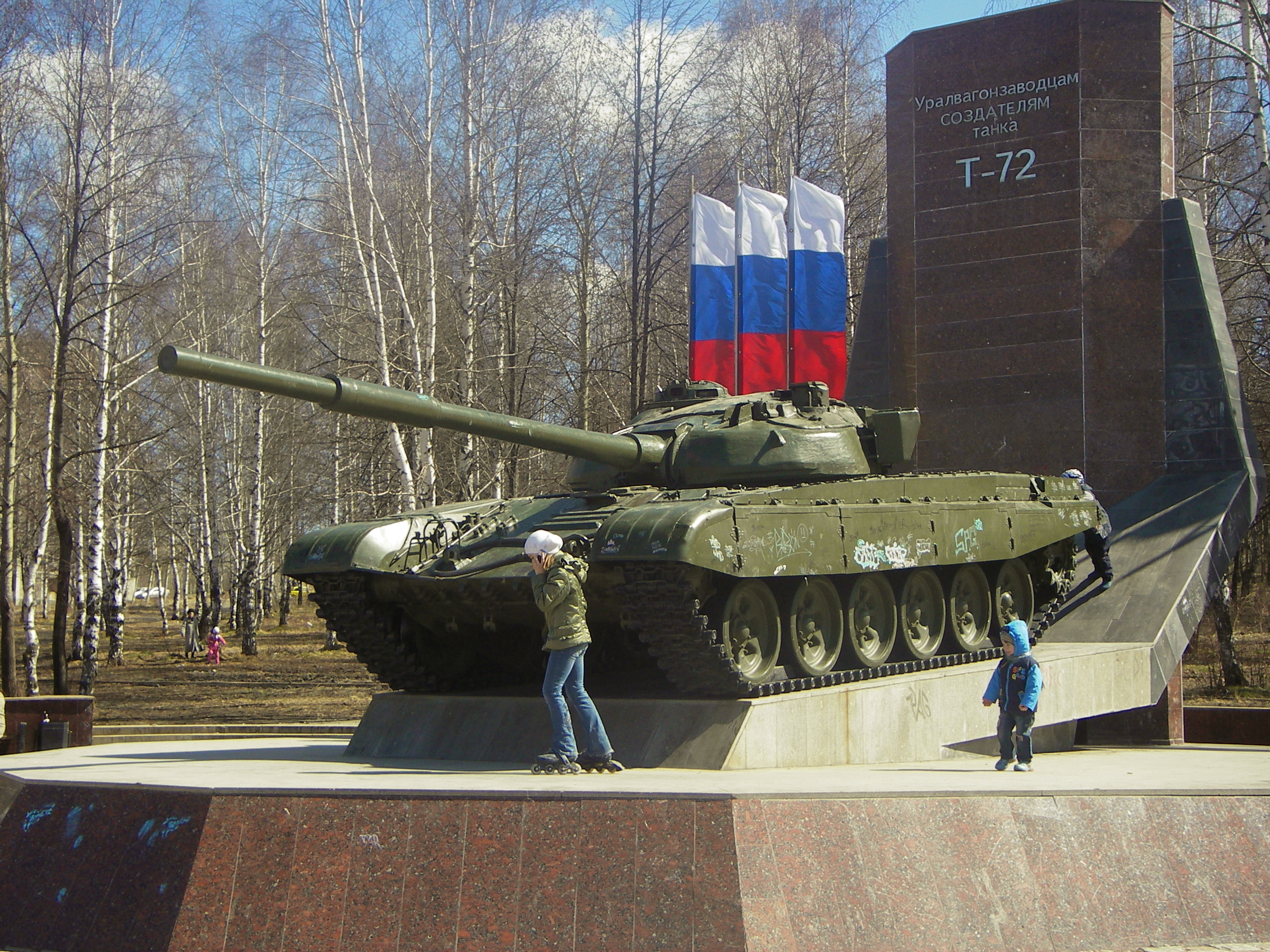
T-72 monument in its production place, Nizhny Tagil

== See also ==
- The Nizhny Tagil Museum of Regional History
