= Aron Zinshtein =

Russian artist

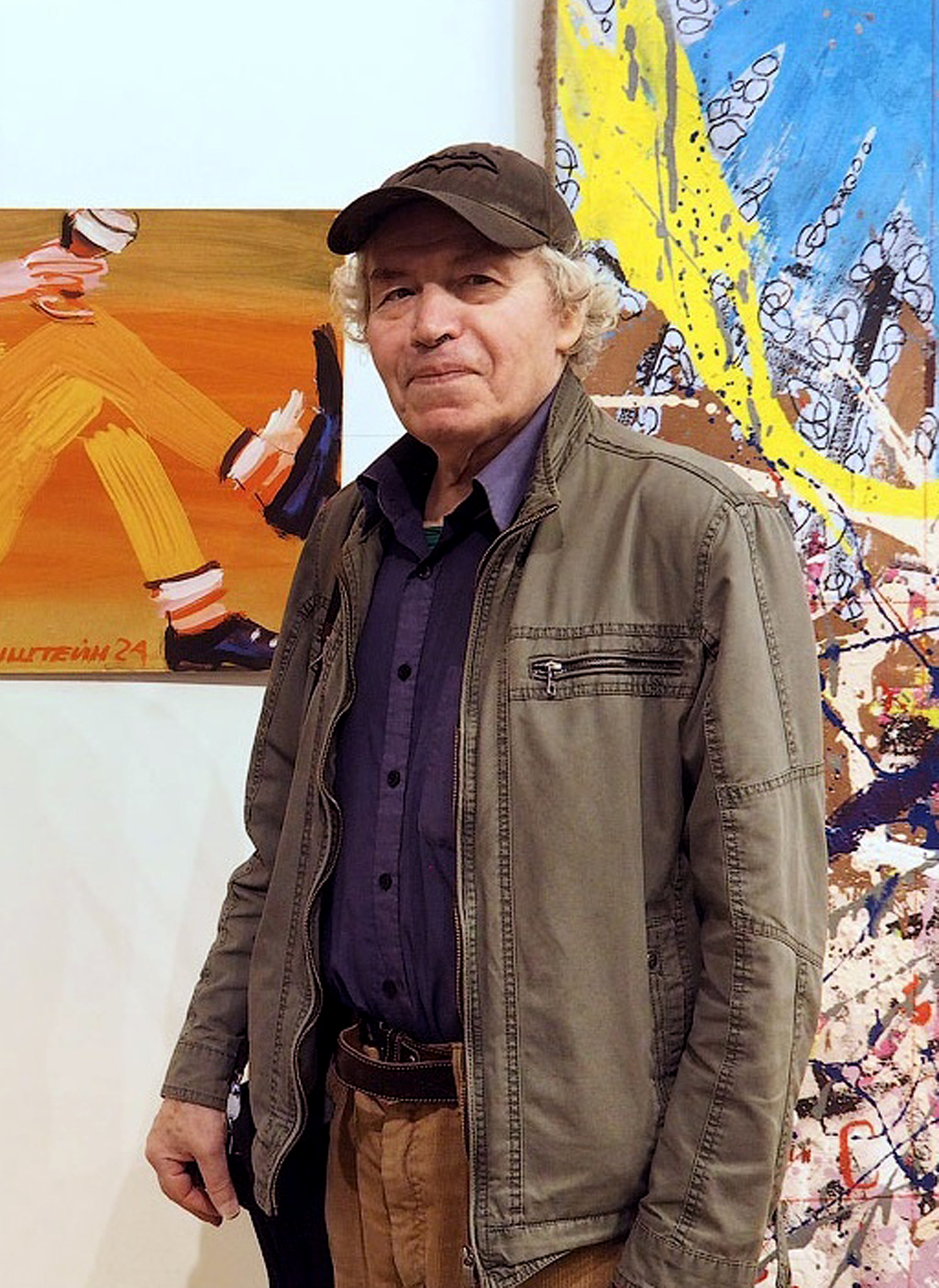
Aron Zinshtein

Aron Iosifovich Zinshtein (Арон Иосифович Зинштейн, also Zinstein and Sinnstein) is a Russian artist.

== Biography ==
Zinshtein was born in Ural Mountains city of Nizhniy Tagil, in 1947. He is a graduate of the Ural School of Applied Arts, 1968; the Mukhina Art Academy, Leningrad. 1977, and became a Member of the Union of Artists of the USSR in 1988 and a Member of the Academy of Contemporary Art, St. Petersburg, in 1994.

Residing in St. Petersburg, Zinshtein has had his work exhibited around the world. His working style has been described as expressionistic, focusing mostly on the human figure.

Zinstein has a record of more than 32 personal and 25 group exhibitions in Russia, Europe, and US. His works are owned by the Russian State Museum in St. Petersburg, Fyodor Dostoevsky Museum in St. Petersburg, Russian National Library in St. Petersburg, Kiev Museum of Russian Art, Bristol Museum (UK) and private collectors in Russia, Germany, US, France, UK, Italy, Japan, and Israel. He is cited on the websites of a number of art galleries as well as that of the Russian American Cultural Center in New York City.
