= The Nizhny Tagil Museum of Regional History =

Russian museum

Nizhny Tagil Museum of Regional History
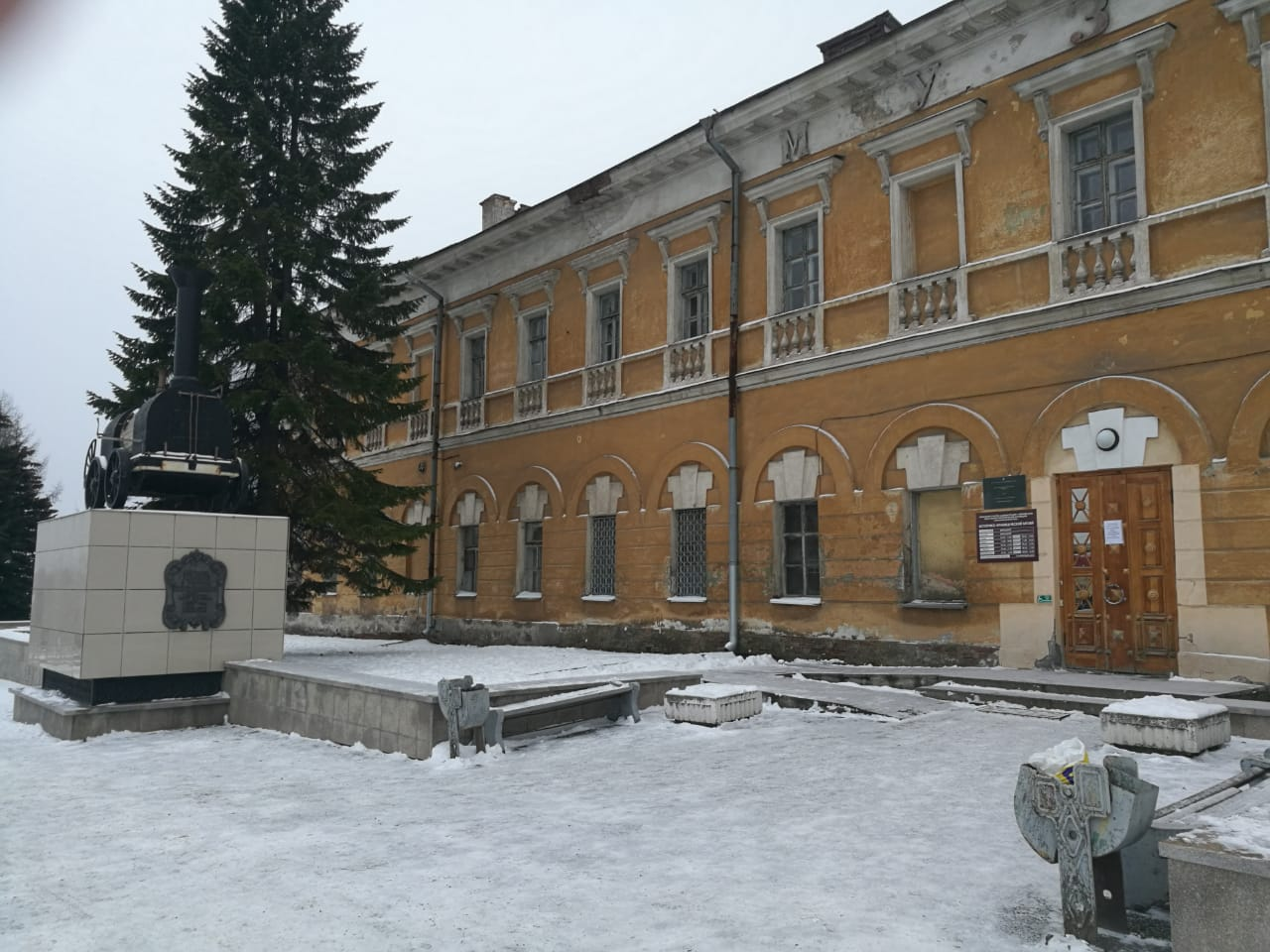
- Established: 1840; 186 years ago
- Location: Nizhny Tagil, Russia
- Coordinates: 57°54′21″N 59°57′05″E
- Executive director: Sergey Valeryevich Starikov
- Website: museum-nt.ru

The Nizhny Tagil Museum of Regional History is the oldest museum in Nizhny Tagil. It is located in the centre of the city, near the Tagil pond, at Lenin Prospekt. The museum belongs to the Nizhny Tagil Museum Reserve "Metallurgical Ural". Furthermore, it is located in the building of the former laboratory outbuilding at the Zavodskaya office. Together with the City Council, it forms the architectural complex called the "Tagil Kremlin".

== History ==
The Nizhny Tagil Museum of Regional History was originally built in 1840 as the Museum of Natural History and Antiquities (Russian: Музеум естественной истории и древностей, Muzeum estestvennoy istorii i drevnostey). The museum was established on the basis of the exhibition that was organized for Tsesarevich Alexander Nikolaevich, the future Emperor Alexander II, who visited Nizhny Tagil in 1837.

On the basis of the collections from "Muzeum" and from the Vyya Museum, Metallurgical Museum of the Nizhny Tagil and Lunyevka Factories was established in 1891. However, this museum closed its doors in 1907 due to lack of funding. It caused the loss of many exhibits.

The museum was re-established only in 1924 as the Nizhny Tagil Museum of the Regional History. By the late 1980s, the exhibits devoted to nature were removed, and the museum became the museum of regional history.

== Exposure ==
In the museum, there are seven exhibit halls. The exposition reflects the history of Nizhny Tagil from ancient times to 1917.
