= Boris Rauschenbach =

Soviet physicist and rocket engineer

- Born: 18 January 1915 (18 January [O.S. 5 January] 1915); Petrograd, Russian Empire (Present day as Saint Petersburg in Russian Federation)
- Died: 27 March 2001 (aged 86); Moscow, Russia
- Citizenship: Russia
- Education: Civil Air Fleet Institute
- Known for: Soviet space program
- Scientific career
- Fields: Physics
- Workplaces: Moscow State University; Energia; Civil Air Fleet

Boris Viktorovich Rauschenbach (Russian: Бори́с Ви́кторович Раушенба́х, romanized: Borís Víktorovič Raušenbách; born Boris-Ivar Rauschenbach; 18 January [O.S. 5 January] 1915, Petrograd – 27 March 2001, Moscow) Russian physicist of German ethnicity who worked as an engineer in the former Soviet space program.

Trained as an engineer, he found great success in designing rockets and who developed the theory and instruments for interplanetary flight control and navigation in 1955-1960s. He is also notable for his studies in Christian theology and theory of Art.

== Biography ==
This article, including quotation, is based on Rauschenbach's 1997 book of autobiographic essays, "Pristrastie" (Obsession)

=== Family roots ===
Boris-Ivar Rauschenbach was born to a protestant family of ethnic Germans, tracing their history to Karl-Friedrich Rauschenbach who settled in Russia in 1766. His father Victor David Rauschenbach, originally a Volga German, was a manager at a leather factory in Saint Petersburg, and the family lived at the factory site until 1925. His mother Lonny Christine Hallik was a Baltic German. The family was bilingual; Rauschenbach said that "I feel myself a German and a Russian at the same time, a peculiar feeling... reflecting reality. We grew up in Russia, immersed in Russian traditions" ("Я чувствую себя одновременно русским и немцем - интересное ощущение... оно отражает реальность. Мы выросли в России, впитали в себя русские обычаи"). Boris attended a former Reformist Protestant school, one of two German-language schools left in the 1920s. The school, plagued by ever-changing novel teaching systems, provided poor education (apart from good language practice).

=== Education ===
Boris, like many young men of his time, was fascinated by flight and aviation. The only aviation-related college in Leningrad was a newly established Institute of Civil Air Fleet, later converted into a military academy. After a brief work at an aircraft plant, Rauschenbach completed his studies at this Institute (1932-1937); later he complained about its poor training quality and lack of tradition. More important was his glider hobby of this time, especially the practical studies of stability in flying wing gliders. Glider enthusiasts' rallies in Crimea exposed Rauschenberg to aviation professionals; in 1937, he received an offer from Sergey Korolyov to join his RNII (Rocket Institute), based in Khovrino near Moscow.

=== Early studies (1937-1941) ===
Sergey Korolyov assigned Rauschenbach to flight control automation for his winged rocket (cruise missile) project. Despite Korolyov's public statements on "All attention to engines!" ("В центре внимания - мотор!"), he realized a wide range of unsolved rocketry problems, notably flight stability and automated controls. Autopilots on conventional planes could be "trained" and tuned by human pilots in flight; rocket designers had to find an alternative "training" technology. Rauschenbach's first assignments on Model 212C jet cruise missile were done in TsAGI wind tunnel. This was followed by crewed rocket plane program, cut short when NKVD arrested Korolyov and Valentin Glushko in summer of 1938. Until 1941, Rauschenbach worked on jet combustion stability, a program that resulted in effective and stable Rocket artillery projectiles. After the German Invasion of 1941, recently married Rauschenbach relocated with his institution east, to Yekaterinburg.

=== Internment (1942-1948) ===
In March 1942, Rauschenbach, then working on auto-targeting anti-aircraft projectiles, was held in a labor camp without trial, like other ethnic Germans. Half of his detachment of around a thousand inmates perished in the first winter. They were working at a brick plant near Nizhny Tagil in Urals. Two weeks after he arrived in the camp, Rauschenbach wrote a technical letter to his former design bureau, commenting on his incompleted work. The letter was promptly received by general Viktor Bolkhovitinov, working on a parallel rocket project, who managed to transfer Rauschenbach from hard labor to a desk job. Until 1946, inmate Rauschenbach performed calculations for Bolkhovitinov's bureau, learning advanced mathematics in the process.

In January 1946, Rauschenbach was dispatched from the camp to an exile in Nizhny Tagil, working there for Mstislav Keldysh calculation bureau. In 1948, Keldysh extricated Rauschenbach from exile, in what the latter called "a long and completely fantastical affair" ("длинная и совершенно фантастическая история"). Rauschenbach worked with Keldysh on jet engine dynamics until 1954, later saying that "In my life, I worked for two bosses only, Korolyov and Keldysh, both men of high integrity, and that's important" ("Начальников в жизни у меня было только два — Королев, и Келдыш, высоконравственные люди, вот что очень важно"). His twin daughters were born in 1950 in Moscow; wife, Vera Rauschenbach, worked in State Historical Museum in Moscow.

=== Space flight control (1954-1970s) ===
In 1954, Keldysh allowed Rauschenbach to concentrate on space flight theory, notably orientation of a spacecraft in flight, although it had little common with Keldysh's own jobs. Next year, Rauschenbach joined the Korolyov firm. "It was not a breakup with Keldysh. Rather, my work outgrew his institute, and Keldysh himself negotiated transfer of my team to Korolyov" ("Это не был разрыв с Келдышем. Просто работы, которые я вел, уже не помещались в институте, и Келдыш сам договорился с Королевым, что я со своей “командой” перехожу к нему").

Rauschenbach's first major success was the lunar flyby of Luna 3 in October 1959, that returned the first photographs of Moon's far side. This was followed by flight control systems for interplanetary probes to Venus, Mars and crewed orbital space flight. He was on the mission control during the flight and recorded Gagarin's first technical reports after it. 1961 Soviet newspapers described his identity as Professor V. Ivanchenko. Rauschenbach also designed instruments for the Vostok 3-Vostok 6 joint flight and the first Soyuz spacecraft docking systems.

=== Rauschenbach School ===
Since 1948, Rauschenbach lectured in Physics and Technical Department of Moscow State University, which was converted to an independent Moscow Institute of Physics and Technology (MFTI) in 1951. Rauschenbach chaired Theoretical Mechanics department in MFTI since 1978. His course of lectures in the recent years was 'Dynamics of spaceflight'.

Rauschenbach trained the first cosmonauts in flight dynamics and spacecraft control systems, but after the death of Korolyov in 1965, he gradually stepped aside from active space program and concentrated on academic activities and his studies of art.

=== Art theories and theology ===
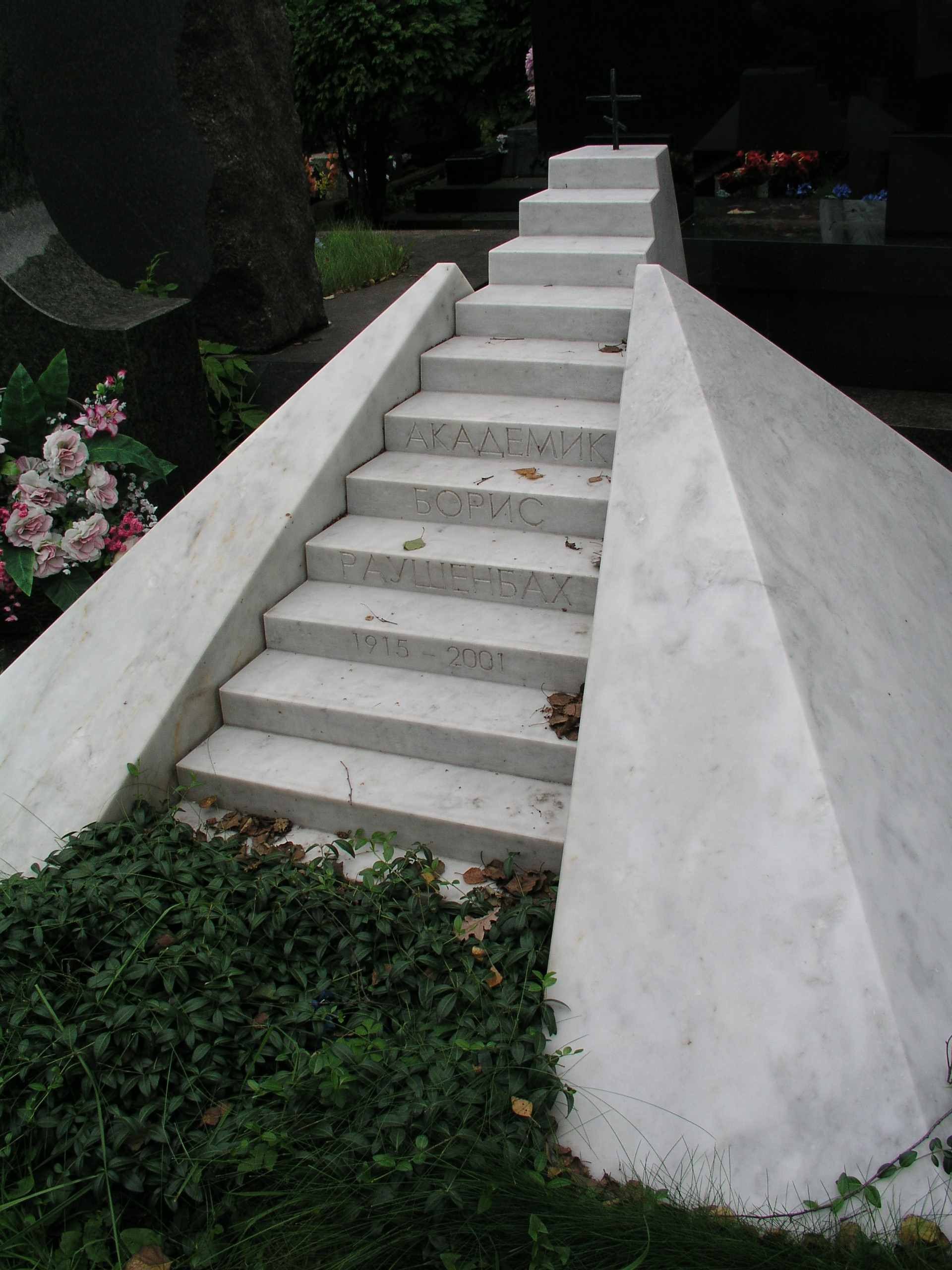
The grave of Boris Rauschenbach in Novodevichy Cemetery, Moscow

Rauschenbach later linked his interest to visual art with the problems of docking spacecraft. During docking operation, pilot could see the other spacecraft only on a TV screen. Does it render real objects well enough, wondered Rauschenbach, to bet the lives of two crews on a flat electronic image? This led him to study perspective and human perception of flat images. This applied problem transformed into general interest in humanities: "Art and art studies, faith and religion live forever, and the man is always anxious to step further into the deep of it" ("искусство и искусствознание, вера и религия существуют вечно, и в человеке всегда живет и будет жить какое-то беспокойство, желание проникнуть как можно глубже в сущность всего этого").

Rauschenbach's first published work outside rocketry, "Spatial composition in old Russian art" (1975) and later "Spatial composition in painting" (1980, including world art) were dedicated to mathematical foundations of perspective in art. His mathematics prove the impossibility of rendering correct spatial perspective on a flat sheet. His studies of the difference between the material artwork and human perception of it indicated that perception differs with the subject of an image. Great artists deliberately distorted perspective, and the degree of distortion depends on the subject.

His theological essays, published in the 1990s, concentrate on the proof of Holy Trinity. This work, as well as studies of icons, earned him credits of Russian Orthodox Church. At the age over 70 Rauschenbach experienced clinical death and after that he was rebaptized converting to Orthodoxy.

=== Awards ===
- 1960 - Lenin Prize for automatic circumlunar flight
- 1961 - Order of Lenin for the first crewed spaceflight
- 1966 - Correspondent member, Academy of Sciences of USSR
- 1986 - Member, Academy of Sciences of USSR
- 1990 - Hero of Socialist Labor
- 1994 - Demidov Prize for works in mechanics
- Asteroid 4237 Raushenbakh is named after him.

== Books by Rauschenbach ==
In English:

- Rauschenbach, Boris V., "Hermann Oberth: The Father of Space Flight 1894-1989", West Art Pub, 1994, ISBN 0-914301-14-4
- Rauschenbach, Boris V., "On My Concept of Perceptual Perspective that Accounts for Parallel and Inverted Perspective in Pictorial Art", Leonardo, Oxford, vol.16, no.1, Winter 1983,
- Rauschenbach, Boris V., "The Rocket Flight Stability Problem: A History of Misconceptions", 30th History of Rocketry and Astronautics, 1996, ISBN 0-87703-498-2

In Russian:

- Раушенбах Б.В. Вибрационное горение, М., 1961г.
- Раушенбах Б.В. Управление ориентацией в космических аппаратах, М., 1974
- Раушенбах Б.В. Системы перспективы в изобразительном искусстве. Общая теория перспективы. - М., 1986
- Раушенбах Б.В. Пространственные построения в живописи. - М., 1980
- Раушенбах Б.В. Геометрия картины и зрительное восприятие. - М., 1994, ISBN 5-352-00001-X
- Раушенбах Б.В. Герман Оберт (1894-1989) М., 1993, ISBN 5-02-006992-2
- Раушенбах Б.В. Пристрастие, - М., 1997, ISBN 5-7784-0020-9
- Раушенбах Б.В. Постскриптум (воспоминания). - М., 1999, ISBN 5-7784-0185-X
- Раушенбах Б.В. Праздные мысли. - М., 2000

== See also ==
- Asif A. Siddiqi, "The Soviet Space Race With Apollo", Florida University Press, 2003, ISBN 0-8130-2628-8
- "Bank of the Universe" - edited by Boltenko A. C., Kiev, 2014., publishing house "Phoenix", ISBN 978-966-136-169-9
- "S. P. Korolev. Encyclopedia of life and creativity" - edited by C. A. Lopota, RSC Energia. S. P. Korolev, 2014 ISBN 978-5-906674-04-3
