= Yefim and Miron Cherepanov =

Russian inventors and industrial engineers

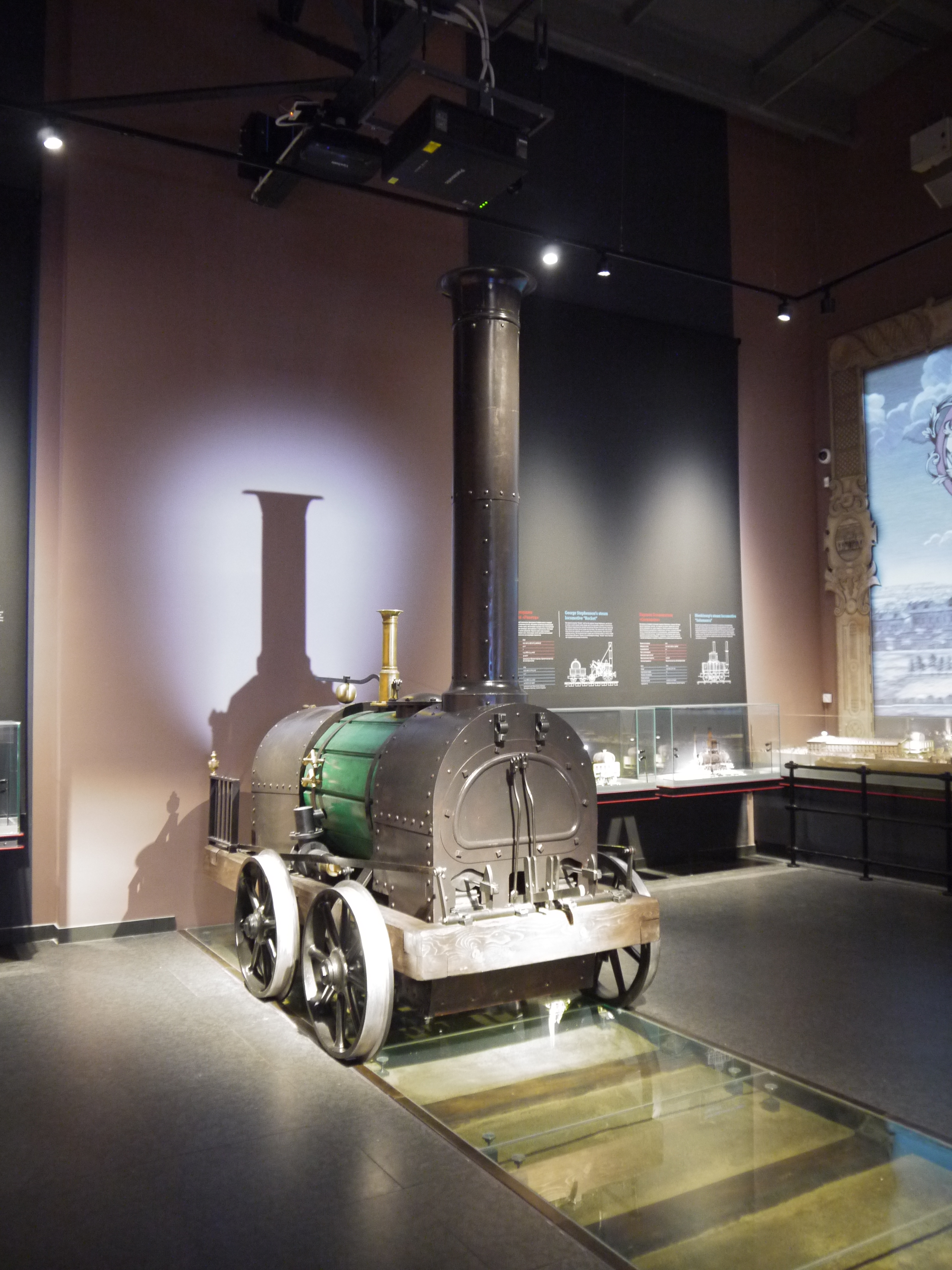
Model of the Cherepanov locomotive at the Russian Railway Museum

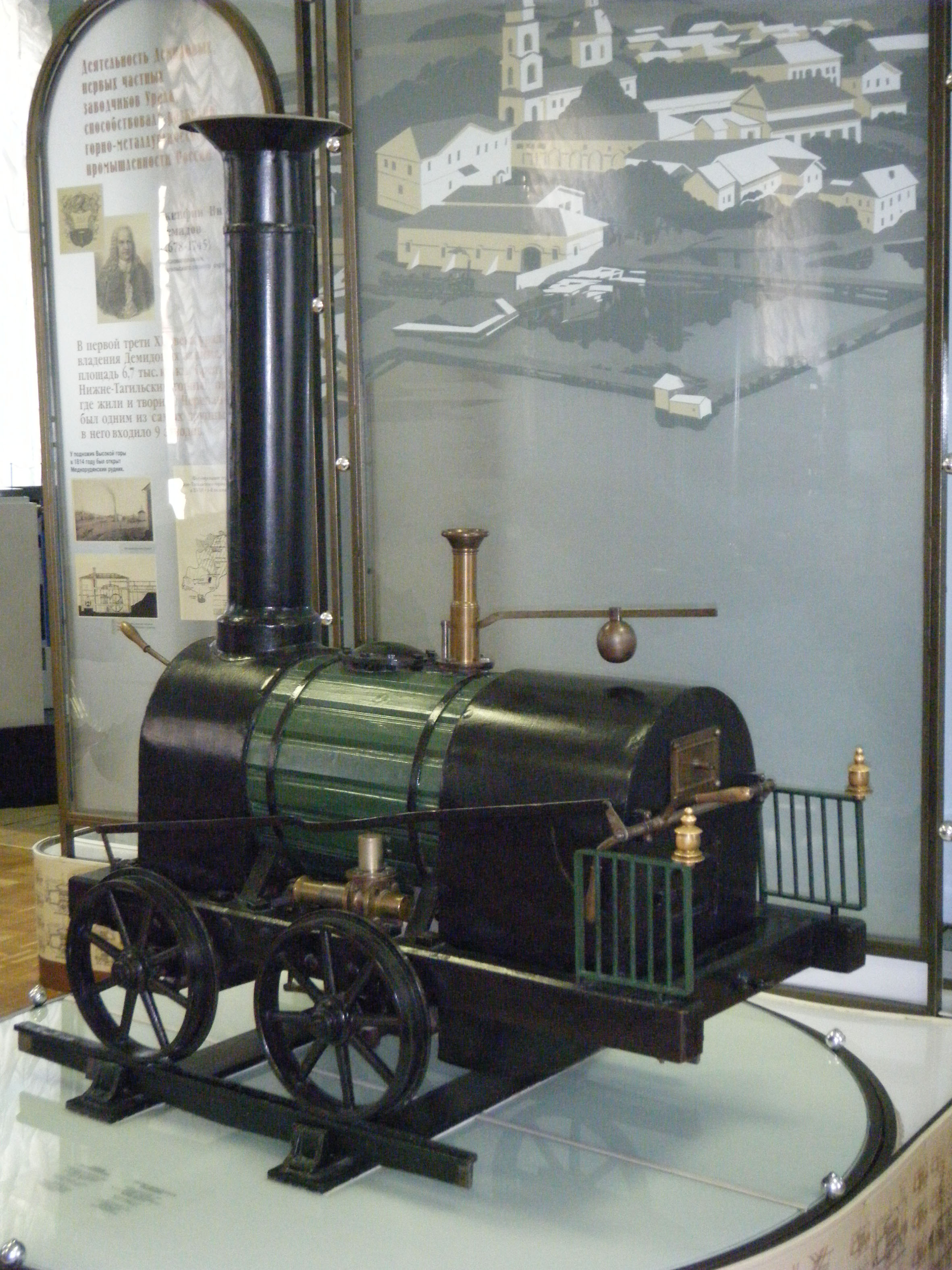
First Russian steam locomotive, by Yefim and Miron Cherepanov, model 1:2, in Polytechnical Museum, Moscow

Yefim Alekseyevich Cherepanov (Russian: Ефи́м Алексе́евич Черепа́нов; 1774 – 1842), and his son Miron Yefimovich Cherepanov (Russian: Миро́н Ефи́мович Черепа́нов; 1803 – 1849) were Russian inventors and industrial engineers. They were serfs of the Demidovs – a famous family of factory owners.

In 1810s Yefim built a progressive machine-building plant, equipped with a full range of innovative metal-cutting lathes (such as screw-cutters, gear-cutting serrating machines and others). From 1822 until his death, Yefim was chief mechanic for all the factories in the town of Nizhny Tagil. Miron was his apprentice and in 1819 was appointed his deputy. Miron became chief mechanic after his father's death.

== Innovations ==
=== Industrial machinery ===
The Cherepanovs significantly improved the machinery that had been used in blast-furnace and gold-mining industries, iron and copper works, sawmills, and flourmills.

=== Steam engines ===
The most interesting aspect of the Cherepanovs' work were steam engines which they tried to introduce into industrial production. From 1820, the Cherepanovs built about 20 steam engines that ranged from 2 to 60 hp.

=== Railroad ===
In 1833-34 they built the first Russian steam locomotive. They also built a cast-iron railroad from one of their factories to a copper mine. Track gauge was 5 ft 6 in (1670 mm). In 1835, they built a second locomotive that they sent to Saint Petersburg. Despite the successful performance and operation of their locomotives, the Cherepanovs' invention found no support outside the factory and, subsequently, horse traction replaced their steam locomotives.

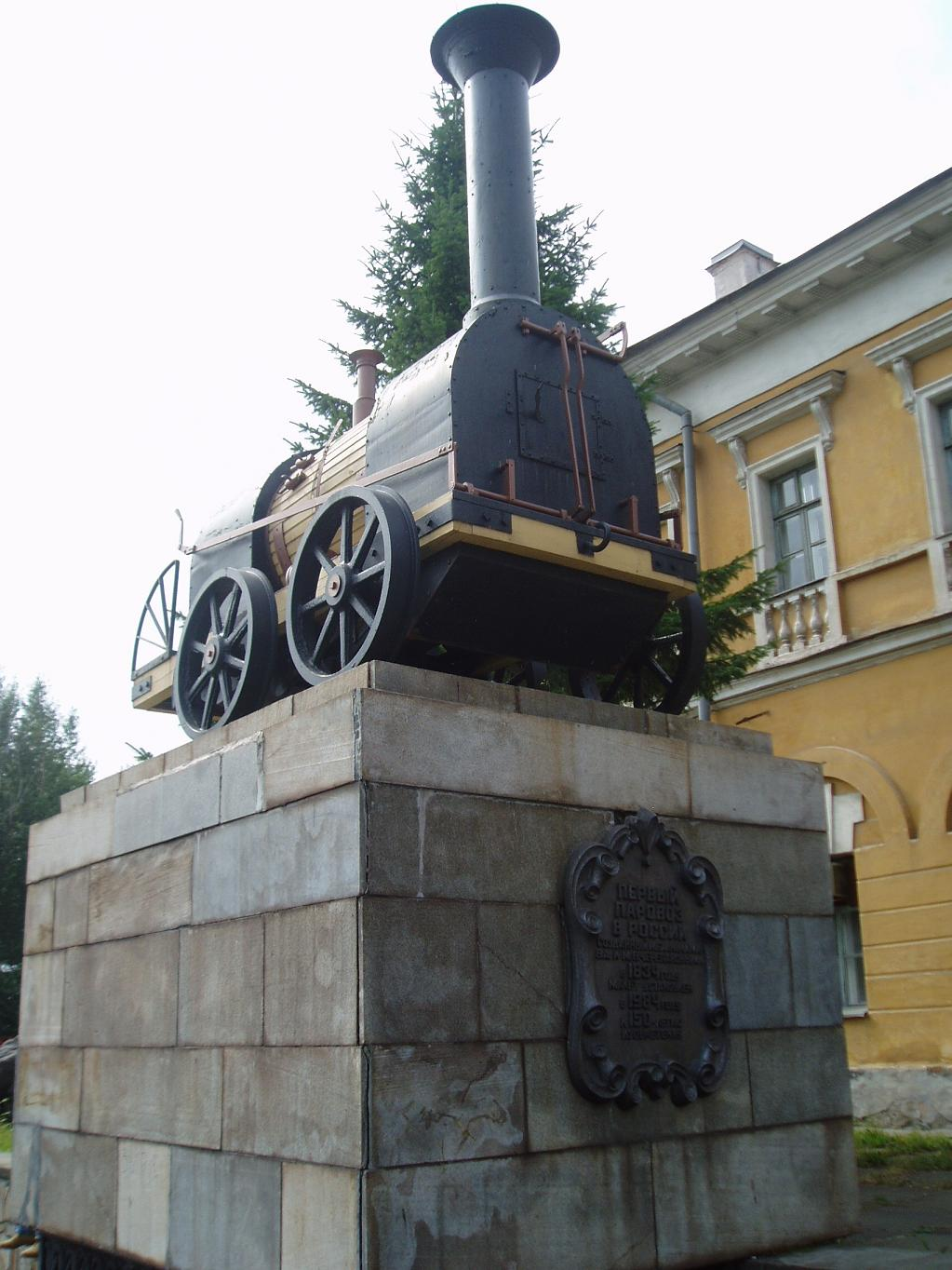
1834 replica of first locomotive of Russia. Monument in Nizhny Tagil

== See also ==
- Russian Railway Museum, Saint Petersburg
- Stephenson's Rocket
- Planet (locomotive)
- Bury Bar Frame locomotive
