= List of Russian steam locomotive classes =

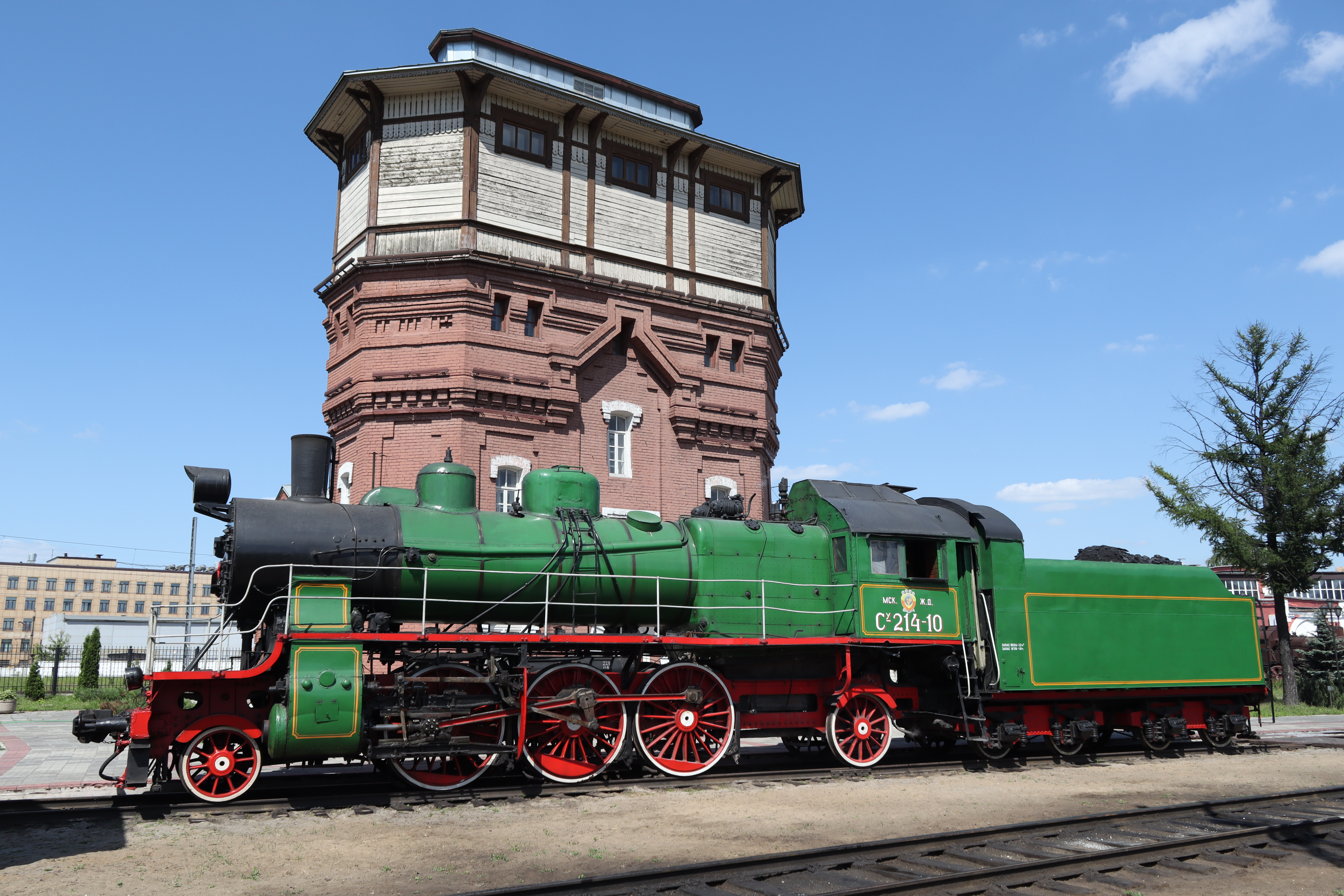
СУ Class Steam Locomotive 2-6-2 Prairie at Podmoskovnaya Depot. June 2022

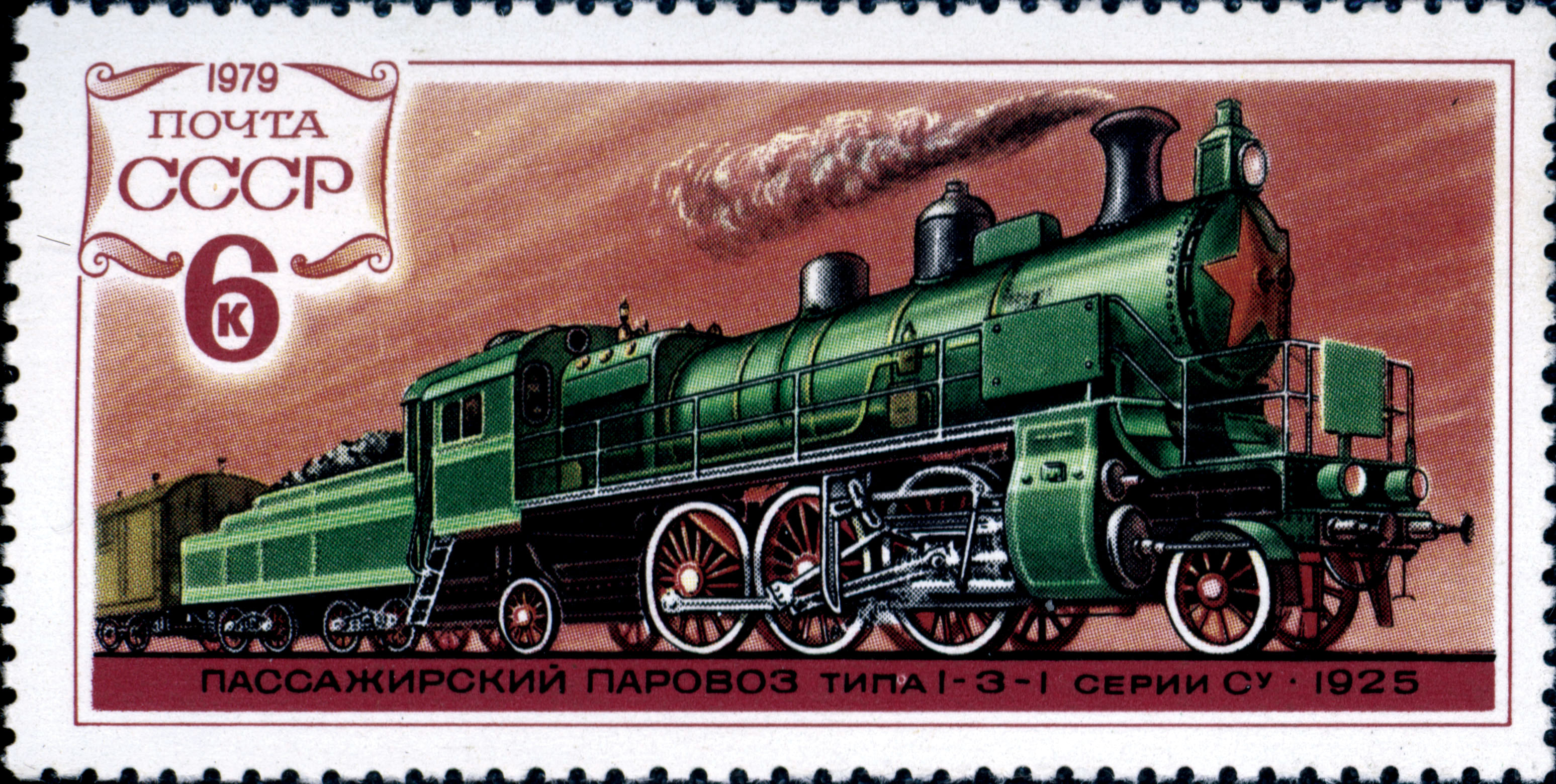
Steam Locomotive Su (Д) type 1-3-1 on 1979 USSR Stamp

This List of Russian steam locomotive classes includes those built both before and during the Soviet era. They are to the gauge of 5 ft (1,524 mm) unless otherwise stated. Some locomotives originally used in Poland during the period of the Russian Empire were built to 4 ft 8 1/2 in (1,435 mm) standard gauge and later converted to 5 ft gauge. Class letters are shown in Cyrillic characters, followed by romanized characters in the next column. For more information, see Romanization of Russian. The main source for this list is Le Fleming and Price's Russian Steam Locomotives.

== Locomotive built before 1925 ==
Class (Cyrillic)	Class (Romanized)	Type	Manufacturer	Quantity	Years built	Notes	Image
—	Cherepanov steam locomotive	2-2-0	Yefim and Miron Cherepanov		1833–1834	The first Russian-built steam locomotive. Track gauge was 5 ft 6 in (1,676 mm).	
Д	D (ru)	0-4-2; 2-4-0; 4-4-0			1856–1906	Class for various four-coupled locomotives	
Т	T (ru)	0-6-0; 2-6-0			1857-1915	Class for various six-coupled locomotives	
Ъ	" (ru)	0-4-4; 2-4-2; 2-6-2; 4-6-0; 4-6-2; 2-8-2			1864–1914	Class for various passenger tank locomotives	
Ф	F (ru)	0-6-0+0-6-0	Avonside, Sharp, Stewart and Company, Yorkshire Engine Company, Kolomna	45	1872–1883	Fairlie locomotives	
Ч	Ch (ru)	0-8-0	Malsevsky, Kolomna, Bryansk, Nevsky, Putilov, Kharkiv, Henschel & Sohn		1878–1911	Class for various eight-coupled locomotives	
О	O	0-8-0	Kolomna, Bryansk, Votkinsk, Nevski, Putilov, Sigl, StEG, Henschel, BMAG, Luhansk, Krasnoye Sormovo, Kharkiv	9129	1890–1928	osnovnoy tip (basic type); Variants with different valve gear and wheel diameters	
П	P (ru)	4-4-0	SACM, Belfort, South Eastern Railways' Odessa Works, Putilov, Kolomna	169	1891–1905	Four-cylinder tandem compound	
Н	N (ru)	2-6-0	Alexandrov, Kolomna, Union, Bryansk, Luhansk, Krasnoye Sormovo, Nevski, Putilov, Votkinsk, Kharkiv	1082	1892–1914	Variants with different valve gear and wheel diameters	
А	A (ru)	4-6-0	Kolomna, Hanomag, Henschel, Krasnoye Sormovo, Lokomotivfabrik Luhansk, Kharkiv Locomotive Factory, Bryansk	533	1892–1907	Variants with different valve gear	
Е^{Ф}	Ye^{F} (ru)	2-10-0	Baldwin	2	1895	Four-cylinder Vauclain compound	
Х	Kh	2-8-0	Baldwin	235	1895–1900	Four-cylinder Vauclain compound	
В	V (ru)	4-6-0	Baldwin	88	1895–1899	Four-cylinder Vauclain compound	
Я	Ya (ru)	2-6-0	Nevski, Putilov	150	1896–1903		
Ц	Ts (ru)	2-8-0	Henschel, Hanomag, Bryansk, Fives-Lille, Société Franco-Belge, SACM-Mühlhausen, Kharkiv	214	1896–1904		
Ж	Zh (ru)	4-6-0	Henschel, Kolomna, Nevski, Kharkiv	210	1896–1909		
Р	R (ru)	2-8-0	Bryansk, Putilov, SACM-Mühlhausen, Krasnoye Sormovo, Kolomna	477	1899–1914	Four-cylinder tandem compound	
Ѳ	Fita (ru)	0-6-6-0	Bryansk, Putilov, Kolomna	463	1899–1924	Mallet locomotives	
Г	G (ru)	4-6-0	Bryansk, Kharkiv	124	1901–1903		
Ш	Sh (ru)	2-8-0	Bryansk, Kharkiv	161	1901–1907		
З	Z (ru)	4-6-0	Kolomna	24	1902–1906		
І	I (ru)	2-4-4-0	Kolomna	112	1903–1905	Mallet locomotives	
У	U	4-6-0	Putilov	56	1906–1910		
Щ	Shch (ru)	2-8-0	Kharkiv, Bryansk, Luhansk, Nevski, Putilov, Krasnoye Sormovo, Kolomna	2028	1906–1924	Variants with different wheel diameter	
Б	B (ru)	4-6-0	Bryansk, Luhansk	252	1907–1914		
К	K (ru)	4-6-0	Kolomna, Putilov, Moscow-Kasaner railway workshops	145	1907–1912		
Ѵ	Izhitsa	0-8-0	Kolomna, Bryansk	56	1908–1918		
И	I (ru)	2-8-0	Kolomna	19	1909–1910		
С	S (ru)	2-6-2	Krasnoye Sormovo, Luhansk, Kharkiv, Nevski	678	1910–1919		
Ы	Y (ru)	0-8-0	Kolomna, Votkinsk	372	1910–1920		
К^{У}	K^{U} (ru)	4-6-0	Kolomna	39	1911–1914	K usilenny (larger K)	
У^{У}	U^{U}	4-6-0	Putilow	6	1912	U usilenny (larger U)	
Э	E	0-10-0	Luhansk, Krasnoye Sormovo, Kharkiv, Kolomna, Bryansk, Newski	1528	1912–1925		
Ѵ^{С} originally Ч^{ВП}_{с}	Y^{S} originally Ch^{VP}_{s}	0-8-0	Krasnoye Sormovo	27	1914–1915	as Standard gauge for the Warsaw–Vienna line.	
С^{В}	S^{V} (ru)	2-6-2	Kolomna	15	1914–1915	Built to standard gauge for Warsaw-Vienna line in 1915. Later converted to 5 ft gauge for Moscow-Kursk line.	
Л from 1947: Л^{П}	L from 1947: L^{P}	4-6-2	Putilov	66	1914–1926		
Е^{С}	Ye^{S}	2-10-0	ALCO	106	1915–1916	^{S} for Schenectady	
Е^{Ф}	Ye^{F}	2-10-0	Baldwin	242	1915	^{F} for Philadelphia; 250 shipped, 8 lost at sea	
Е^{К}	Ye^{K}	2-10-0	CLC	50	1915–1916	^{K} for Kingston	
Е^{Л}	Ye^{L}	2-10-0	ALCO, Baldwin	al least 554	1916–1919	^{L} for chief engineer A. I. Lipez	
Э^{Ш}	E^{Sh}	0-10-0	NoHAB	500	1920–1924	Two with Uniflow steam engine designated Э^{М}_{Ш} (E^{M}_{Sh})	
Э^{Г}	E^{G}	0-10-0	AEG, Borsig, Hanomag, SMF, Henschel, Hohenzollern, Humboldt, Jung, Karlsruhe, Krauss, Krupp, LHW, O&K, Rheinmetall, BMAG, Vulcan, Wolf, Maffei, Esslingen	700	1921–1923	1 rebuilt to condensing locomotive in 1933 and designated Э^{ГК} (E^{GK})	
Х^{М}	Kh^{M}	2-8-0	H.K. Porter		1915-1916	Designated as sub-class of Х but shares little similarities.	
Ф	F	2-10-0				État Belge type 36	
Ь (ru)	'	0-4-0; 0-4-2; 2-4-0; 0-6-0; 0-6-2; 0-6-4; 0-8-0; 2-10-2			to 1957	Class for various goods tank locomotives	

== Locomotives built after 1925 ==
Class (Cyrillic)	Class (Romanized)	Type	Manufacturer	Quantity	Years built	Notes	Image
С^{У}	S^{U}	2-6-2	Bryansk, Krasnoye Sormovo, Kolomna, Luhansk, Kharkiv	2270	1925–1941	36 with higher axleload designated С^{УТ} (S^{UT}); 210 with draught fan designated С^{УМ} (S^{UM})	
С^{У}	S^{U}	2-6-2	Krasnoye Sormovo	411	1947–1951	2 with mechanical stokers designated С^{УР} (S^{UR})	
М	M (ru)	4-8-0	Luhansk, Putilov	100	1926–1930	Rebuilt from 1932 as 2-cylinder designated М^{Р} (M^{R})	
Э^{У}	E^{U}	0-10-0	Kolomna, Luhansk, Krasnoye Sormovo, Bryansk, Kharkiv	2535	1926–1931		
Т^{A}	T^{A} (ru)	2-10-4	ALCO	5	1931	Experimental locomotives	
Т^{Б}	T^{B} (ru)	2-10-2	Baldwin	5	1931	Experimental locomotives	
ФД20	FD20	2-10-2	Voroshilovgrad	2927	1931–1940	FD after Felix Dzerzhinsky; 2 Condensing locomotives designated ФД^{К} (FD^{K})	
ИС20 from 1962: ФД^{П}20	IS20 from 1962: FD^{P}20	2-8-4	Kolomna, Voroshilovgrad	638	1932–1941	IS after Joseph Stalin	
Э^{М}	E^{M}	0-10-0	Voroshilovgrad, Krasnoye Sormovo, Bryansk, Kharkiv	2325	1932–1935	18 converted to condensing locomotives and designated Э^{МК} (E^{MK}) between 1937 and 1940	
Я	Ya	4-8-2+2-8-4	Beyer, Peacock & Company	1	1932	Experimental Garratt locomotive – the biggest Garratt locomotive ever built.	
Э^{Р}	E^{R}	0-10-0	Murom workshops	(1)	(1933)	Rebuilt from Э^{М} (E^{M})	
Э^{Р}	E^{R}	0-10-0	Voroshilovgrad, Bryansk	305	1934–1936		
Э^{Р}	E^{R}	0-10-0	Kolomna	22	1943–1944		
Э^{Р}	E^{R}	0-10-0	Reșița, MÁVAG, Malaxa, ČKD, Cegielski, Škoda	2716	1946–1955		
АА20	AA20	4-14-4	Voroshilovgrad	1	1934	Experimental locomotive; AA after Andrey Andreyevich Andreyev	
СО	SO (ru)	2-10-0	Kharkiv, Bryansk, Ulan-Ude, Krasnoyarsk, Voroshilovgrad	2523	1934–1951	SO after Grigory (Sergo) Ordzhonikidze; 2 condensing locomotives designated СО^{К} (SO^{K})	
9П	9P (ru)	0-6-0	Kolomna, Novocherkassk, Murom workshops	2688	1935–1957		
СО19 also СО^{К}	SO19 also SO^{K}	2-10-0	Kharkiv, Bryansk, Ulan-Ude, Voroshilovgrad	1436	1936–1942	Condensing locomotives	
В5	V5 (ru)	0-4-4	Kolomna	1	1937	Experimental locomotive with high pressure boiler	
2-3-2К	2-3-2K	4-6-4	Kolomna	2	1937–1938	Experimental locomotives	
2-3-2В	2-3-2V	4-6-4	Voroshilovgrad	1	1938	Experimental locomotive	
СО18 also СО^{В}	SO18 also SO^{V}	2-10-0	Kharkiv, Bryansk, Voroshilovgrad	489	1939–1946		
ФД21	FD21	2-10-2	Voroshilovgrad, Ulan-Ude	286	1940–1942	as ФД20 (FD20), with 21 t axleload	
Л^{К}	L^{K} (ru)	2-10-0	Voroshilovgrad	1	1941	Experimental locomotive	
ИС21 from 1962: ФД^{П}21	IS21 from 1962: FD^{P}21	2-8-4	Voroshilovgrad	11	1941–1942	as ИС20 (IS20), but with 21 t axleload	
ФД^{Р}18	FD^{R}18	2-10-4	Ulan-Ude	(85)	(1943–1944)	Converted from ФД (FD); 18 t axleload;	
Ш^{А}	Sh^{A}	2-8-0	ALCO, Baldwin	194	1943	USATC S160 Class; 200 shipped, 6 lost at sea	
Е^{А}	Ye^{A}	2-10-0	ALCO, Baldwin	1622	1944–1946		
Е^{М}	Ye^{M}	2-10-0	Baldwin	425	1944–1947	13 with feedwater heater Е^{МВ} (E^{MV})	
Л originally П	L originally P	2-10-0	Kolomna, Voroshilovgrad, Bryansk	4199	1945–1955		
23 also УУ	23 (ru) also UU	2-10-4	Ulan-Ude	1	1949	Experimental locomotive	
ОР23	OR23	2-10-4	Voroshilovgrad	1	1949	OR after October Revolution Locomotive Works; Experimental locomotive	
П34	P34	2-6-6-2	Kolomna	1	1949	Experimental Mallet locomotive	
П36	P36	4-8-4	Kolomna	251	1950–1956		
ЛВ originally ОР18	LV originally OR18	2-10-2	Voroshilovgrad	522	1952–1956		
ОР21	OR21 (ru)	2-10-2	Voroshilovgrad	3	1953–1954	Experimental locomotives	
П38	P38	2-8-8-4	Kolomna	4	1954–1955	Experimental Mallet locomotive	
9П^{м}	9P^{M} (ru)	0-6-0	Murom workshops	500	1955–1957		

== Captured locomotives ==
Class (Cyrillic)	Class (Romanized)	Type	Manufacturer	Quantity	Years built	Notes	Image
ТЭ	TE	1'E h2	Various	~2700	1942-1945	Deutsche Reichsbahn Kriegsloks. Some standard gauge, used in the Baltic and border republics. 100 transferred to Hungarian State Railways in 1963.	

== Locomotive builders ==
- Kolomna, Moscow, founded 1862
- Nevsky, Saint Petersburg, first locomotive 1870
- Briansk, Moscow, founded 1873
- Kirov Plant (or Putilov), Saint Petersburg, first locomotive 1894
- Kharkov Locomotive Factory, first locomotive 1897
- Sormovo Factory, Nizhny Novgorod, first locomotive 1898

== See also ==
- History of rail transport in Russia
- Rail transport in the Soviet Union
- Russian Railway Museum, in St.Petersburg
