= Soviet locomotive class P36 =

Type of steam locomotive

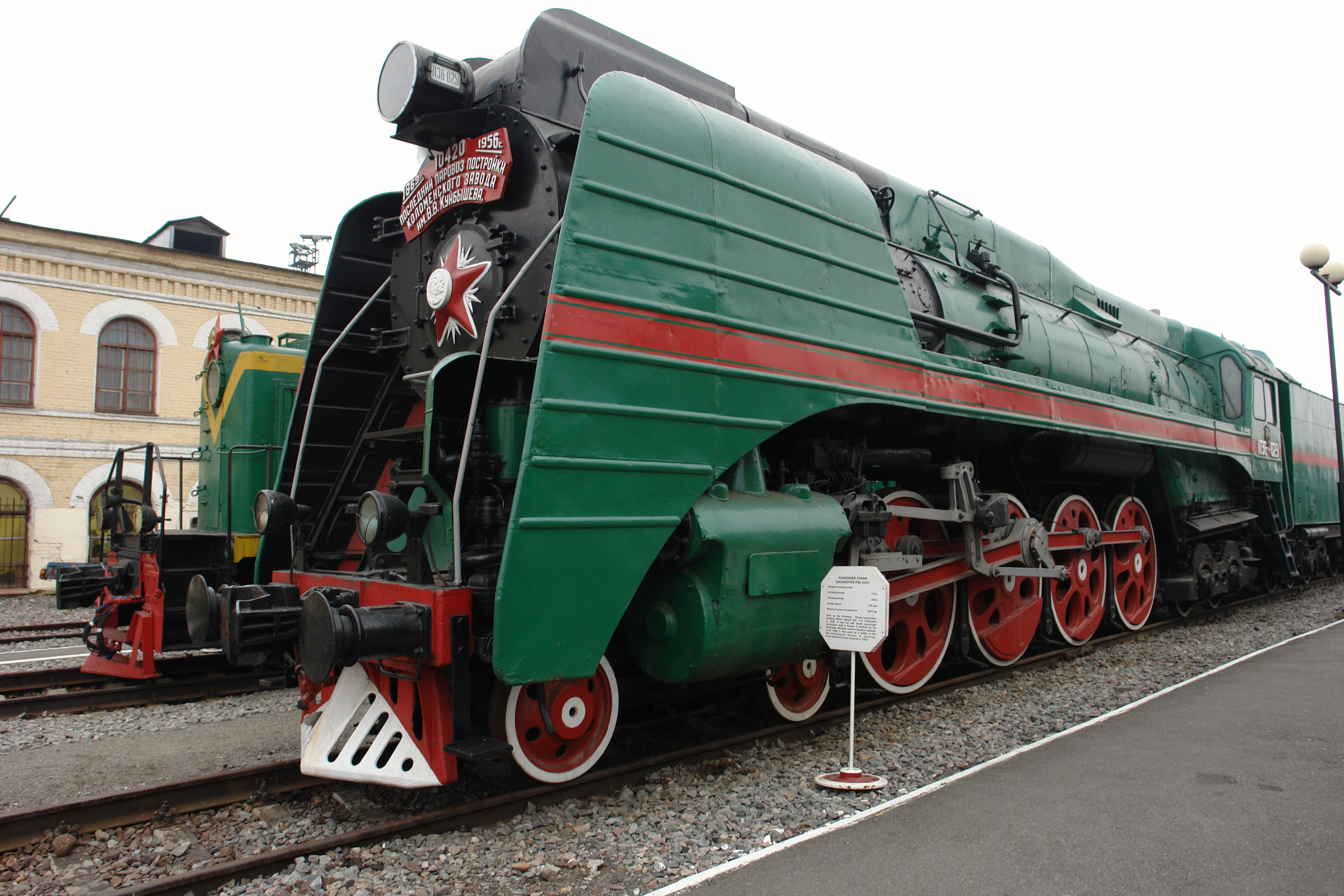
- P36-0251 - the last steam locomotive built at Kolomna Works
Type and origin
- Power type: Steam
- Builder: Kolomna Locomotive Works
- Build date: 1952, 1953–1956
- Total produced: 251
Specifications
- Configuration
  - Whyte: 4-8-4
- Gauge: 1,524 mm (5 ft)
- Leading dia.: 900 mm (35.43 in)
- Driver dia.: 1,850 mm (72.83 in)
- Trailing dia.: 1,050 mm (41.34 in)
- Length: 16.661 m (54 ft 8 in) (w/o tender)
- Firebox
  - Grate area: 6.75 m^{2} (72.7 sq ft)
- Boiler pressure: 15 kgf/cm^{2} (1.47 MPa; 213 psi)
- Superheater
  - Type: Dvuhoborotny
  - Heating area: 131.7 m^{2} (1,418 sq ft) (No. 1), 149.2 m^{2} (1,606 sq ft)
- Cylinders: Two, outside
- Cylinder size: 575 mm × 800 mm (22.64 in × 31.50 in) bore x stroke
Performance figures
- Maximum speed: 125 km/h (78 mph)
Career
- Operators: Russian Railways
- Class: П36
- Numbers: П36-0001 - П36-0251
- Locale: Russia
- Retired: 1963-1987
- Preserved: 26
- Scrapped: 1965-1991

The Soviet locomotive class P36 (Russian: П36) was a Soviet mainline passenger steam locomotive type. Between 1950 and 1956, 251 locomotives were built. The locomotives were nicknamed "Generals" because of the red stripe down the side. The P36 had the same power as a class IS locomotive but the axle loading of 18 tons allowed its use on the vast majority of Russian railway lines, replacing class Su 2-6-2s and significantly increasing the weight of passenger trains. The P36 was the last type of mainline steam locomotive built in the Russian SFSR and the last one built, P36-0251, was the last steam locomotive produced by Kolomna Works, Russian SFSR. Though sometimes described as the "Victory" type locomotive, that nick-name actually belongs to the class L 2-10-0 built between 1945 and 1947.

== Development history ==
=== Background ===
By the early 1940s, the backbone of the Soviet passenger fleet was the class Su 2-6-2, of which more than 2,000 examples were in service. These locomotives had been designed in the 1920s and had a reputation as reliable and economical performers. Axle load was 18 tons, which permitted their use on the majority of the Soviet rail system. However they were not overly powerful (about 1500 hp), which prevented their use with longer passenger trains.

In 1932 Kolomna Works began production on a new 2-8-4 locomotive, designed in 1930 and designated class IS (for "Iosif Stalin"). The class IS had more power than the class Su (about 2500 hp) and shared many components with the class FD 2-10-2 freight locomotive, easing repairs. It became the new premier passenger locomotive on the Soviet railway system but its higher axle loading (20.2 tons) meant that its use was restricted to only certain lines. Following the end of the Second World War, railway traffic increased as the national economy recovered. New passenger locomotives with 18-ton axle loading were needed, as the class Su locomotives were often needed in double-headed configuration.

=== Design ===
In 1946 the All-Union Scientific Research Institute of Railway Transport (VNIIZhT) published basic requirements for a new passenger locomotive. Based on results from the two primary existing types of passenger locomotive, the class C and the class IS, four possible types were proposed:

- 3000 hp (equivalent to a class UU locomotive) - either 4-8-4 or 4-6-4 wheel arrangement with 22.5 ton axle load
- 2500 hp (equivalent to a class IS locomotive) - either 4-8-4 or 2-8-4 wheel arrangement with 18 ton axle load
- 2000 hp (equivalent to a class L locomotive) - either 2-8-2 or 4-6-4 wheel arrangement with 18 ton axle load
- 1500 hp (equivalent to a class Su locomotive) - either 4-6-2 or 2-6-4 wheel arrangement with 18 ton axle load

After analyzing the various proposals, VNIIZhT workers concluded that a 4-8-4 locomotive producing 3000 hp would meet requested performance characteristics, but as a locomotive with 18-ton axle loading was needed, in 1947 Kolomna Works was given orders to design and produce a 4-8-4 with 18-ton axle loading. The design team was led by L. S. Lebedyanskiy and included engineers GA Zhilin and I. Sulimtsevym among others.

=== Prototype locomotive ===
In March 1950 the prototype locomotive, P36-0001, was completed at Kolomna. It employed all of the latest technology in Soviet locomotive construction including a welded boiler, mechanical stoker, power reverse, cast frame, and roller bearings on all engine and tender axles. The locomotive was tested on the October Railway, based out of Moscow, where it was tested severely including pulling freight trains on passenger train schedules. Results proved to be positive, with the locomotive typically developing 2500–2600 hp or as high as 3077 hp at 86.4 km/h. Thermal efficiency was 9.22%, the highest of any Soviet passenger locomotive and only .05% lower than the class LV.

=== Production locomotives ===
Since the test results were positive, Kolomna Works was given an order for a small batch of prototype locomotives. In 1953 four more locomotives were built, numbered 0002–0005, and in 1954 another locomotive numbered 0006 was constructed. Some changes were made to the design of the axle boxes, shoes and wedges; the smoke box blower utilized on the first prototype was dispensed with; and the decorative streamlining panels were simplified. Numbers 0003 and 0004 were sent to the Moscow-Kursk line for testing, while 0002 and 0005 were tested at Krasnoyarsk and 0006 was tested on the test track at VNIIZhT.

The initial batch of 30 production locomotives numbered 0007–0036 was produced in 1954, including small changes made from the prototypes. At the end of the year the P36 type was approved for mass production, and in 1955 Kolomna Works produced 155 locomotives numbered 0037–0161, followed by another 90 built in 1956 (0162–0251). Over the course of production minor changes were made to the design.

However almost as soon as it was begun, production was curtailed. The reason was that in February 1956 at the 20th Communist Party Congress it was decided that steam locomotive construction in the Soviet Union would be curtailed and that steam power would be replaced by electric and diesel-electric locomotives. The last steam locomotive produced at Kolomna, P36-0251, was outshopped on June 29 of that year. On the smoke box door was written "1869 - 10420 - 1956 Last steam locomotive built by Kolomna Works" (10420 being the serial number of the locomotive).

== Specifications ==
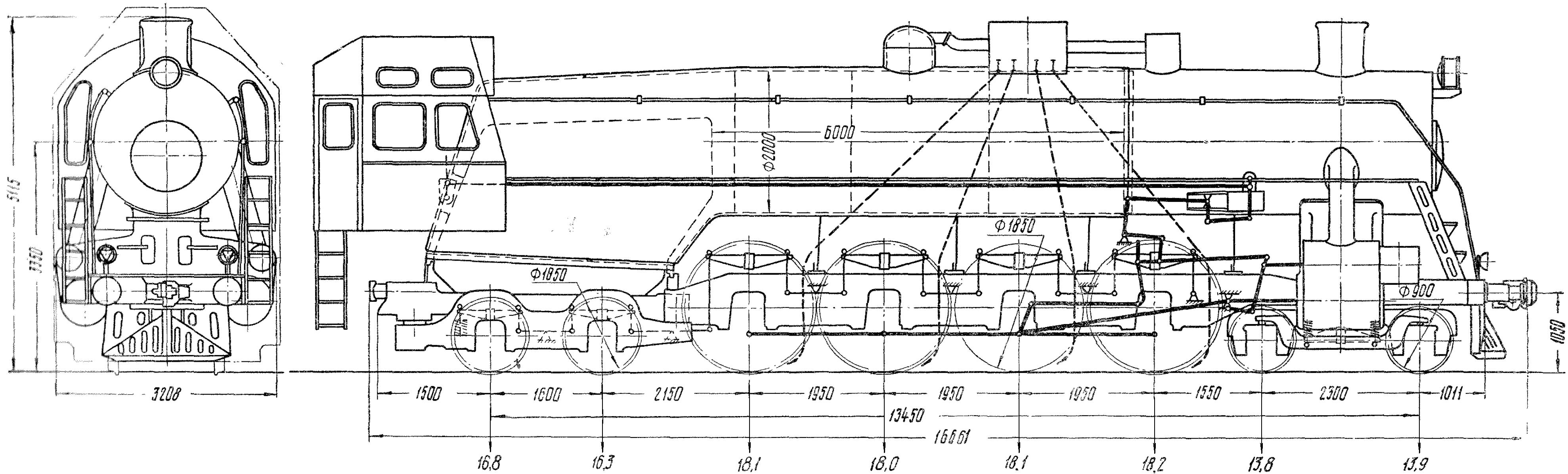
Class P36 locomotive elevation

The P36 chassis consists of a main frame and two bogies, a leading bogie and trailing bogie. The frame consists of 140 mm thick bars, similar to class L and class LV locomotives. All axles are equipped with roller bearings and the drivers employ disc wheels. The drivers are 1850 mm in diameter, the same as used on Su and IS class locomotives. The all-welded boiler includes 66 flues and 50 fire tubes, with the design of the boiler and superheater identical to that used in the experimental P34 type locomotive. On the prototype locomotive a smoke box blower was employed, but was omitted from later locomotives due to reliability problems.

On the first prototype locomotive a six-axle P35-type tender was used, but on later locomotives a six-axle P58-type tender was employed instead. An automatic stoker is fitted to the locomotive. Two turbogenerators (duty and standby) supply 1 kW of electricity to the train.

== Operational history ==
In regular service, P36 type locomotives were generally used on mainline long-distance trains. In particular the P36 locomotives were used on the Moscow-Skuratovo, Moscow-Michurinsk, Moscow-Pokhvistnevo, Moscow-Leningrad, Moscow-Murom, Krasnoyarsk-Taishet and Krasnoyarsk-Ilansky lines in the Russian SFSR. Use of this type made it possible to increase not only the weight of the trains used on these lines but also their speed. For example, when P36 locomotives were placed into Moscow-Leningrad service they reduced running time by 1 hour 45 minutes to 9½ hours with average speed increased from 58 to 69 km/h. Mass conversion of main line railways to diesel and electric power led to P36 locomotives increasingly being relegated to more remote and less used lines; by 1958 the locomotives had already been replaced on the Moscow-Leningrad run.

The last year when P36 locomotives were used in active service was 1974, running from Mogocha and Bilohirsk depots on the Trans-Baikal Railway, though in 1976 there were still 247 P36 type locomotives listed as available on the railway inventory. These included 15 locomotives in Belarus, 9 on the Northern line, 14 on the East Siberian, 150 on the Trans-Baikal and 59 on the Far East line.

== Preserved locomotives ==
=== In working condition ===
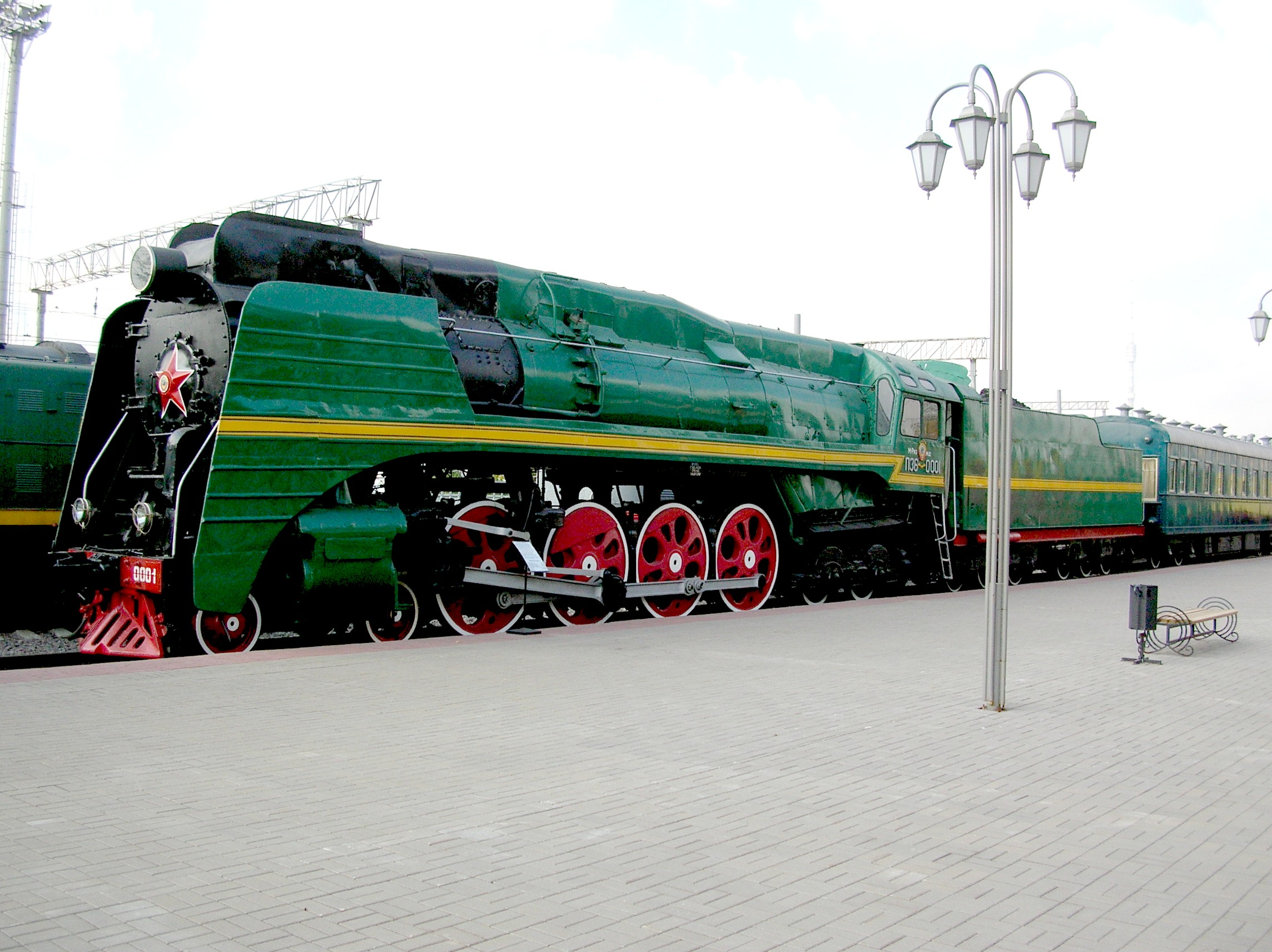
P36-0001 at the Moscow Railway Museum

- P36-0027 - Restoration to working order completed at Tikhoretsk, Russia, in April 2016. Based in Moscow.
- P36-0031 - Currently based in Saint Petersburg, Russia
- P36-0032 - Previously privately owned by Golden Eagle Luxury Trains. Donated to RZD in 2019. Restored to operation at Troitsk in 2020. Based in Saint Petersburg, Russia
- P36-0071 - Restored to working order in 2023.
- P36-0096 - Restored to operation in 2024. Based in Yekaterinburg. Formerly on display in Severobaykalsk, Buryatia Oblast, Russia.
- P36-0107 - Restored to working order at Troitsk in 2020, Based in Moscow
- P36-0110 - Restored to working order at Tikhoretsk, based in Moscow, Russia
- P36-0120 - Restored to working order at Tikhoretsk, based in Moscow
- P36-0147 - Restored to working order at Tikhoretsk & Troitsk in 2019, based in Yaroslavl, Russia
- P36-0218 - Restored to working order at Tikhoretsk, currently based in Bataysk/Tikhoretsk

=== In museums ===
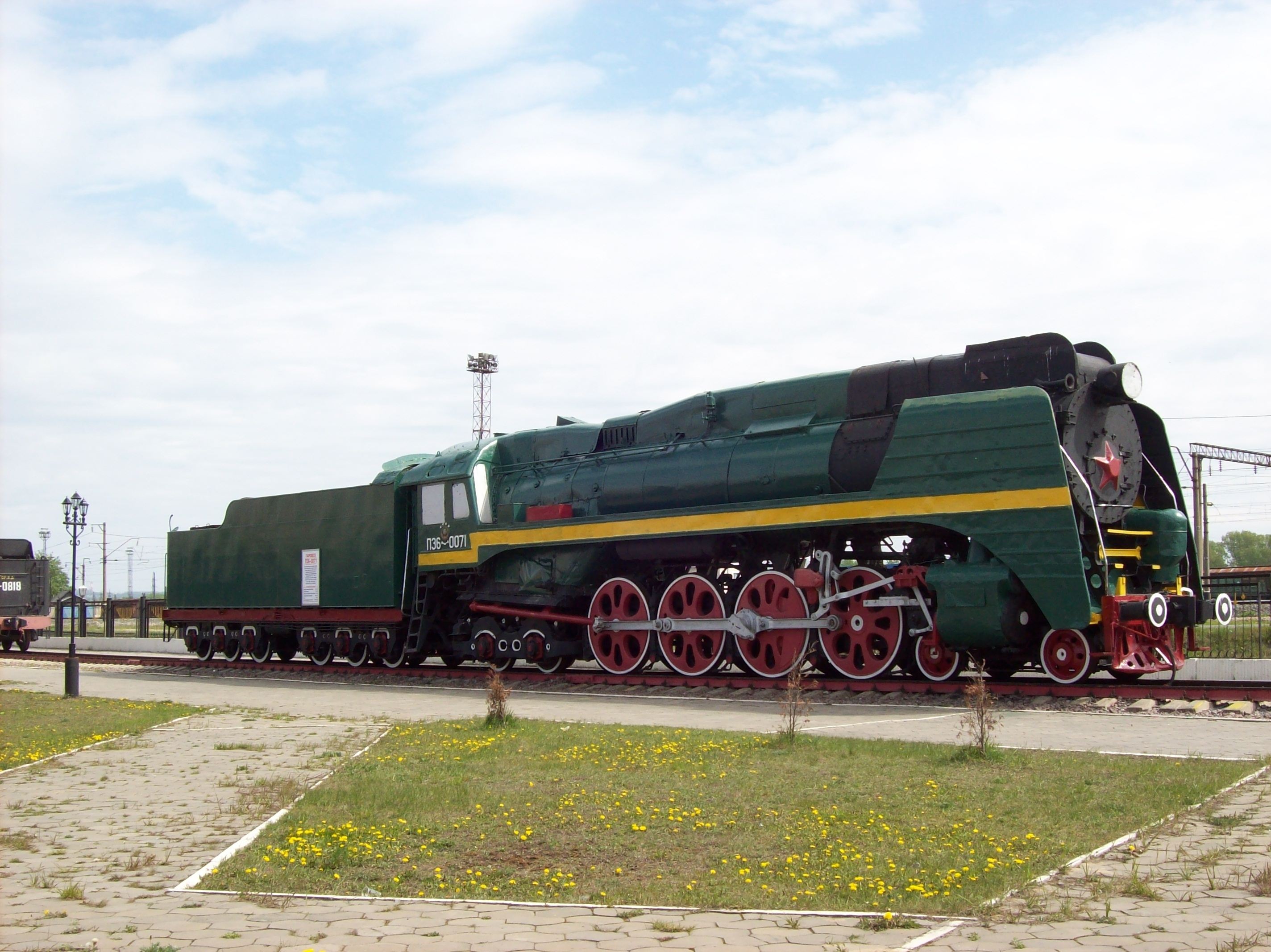
P36-0071 in NIzhny Novgorod

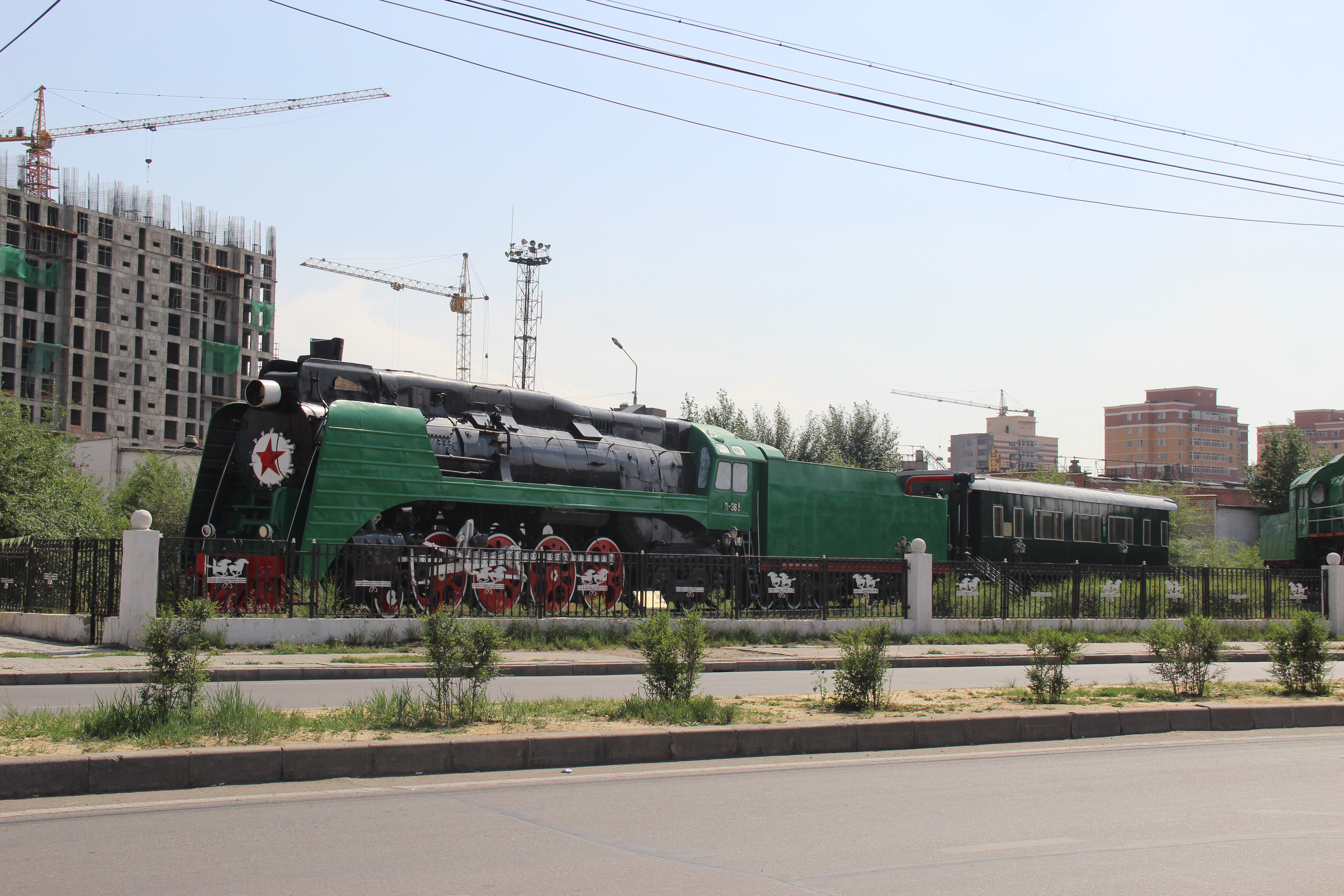
P36-0228 in Ulaanbaatar

- P36-0001 - Moscow Railway Museum at Riga Station (museum closed in 2023, currently stored at Podmoskovnaya Depot in Moscow).
- P36-0050 - Brest Railway Museum, Belarus
- P36-0064 - Brest Railway Museum, Belarus (Removed from museum in 2022 due to lack of space. Will supposedly be restored to operation)
- P36-0097 - Novosibirsk Railway Museum, Russia
- P36-0123 - Mukran Railroad Museum, Germany
- P36-0182 - Chelyabinsk Railway Museum, Russia
- P36-0228 - Dund Goal Railroad Museum, Ulaanbaatar, Mongolia
- P36-0232 - Samara Railway Museum, Russia
- P36-0249 - Lebyazhye Railway Museum, Lebyazhye, Lomonosovsky District, Leningrad Oblast, Russia
- P36-0250 - Tashkent Railway Museum, Uzbekistan
- P36-0251 - Russian Railway Museum, Saint Petersburg

=== Memorial steam locomotives ===
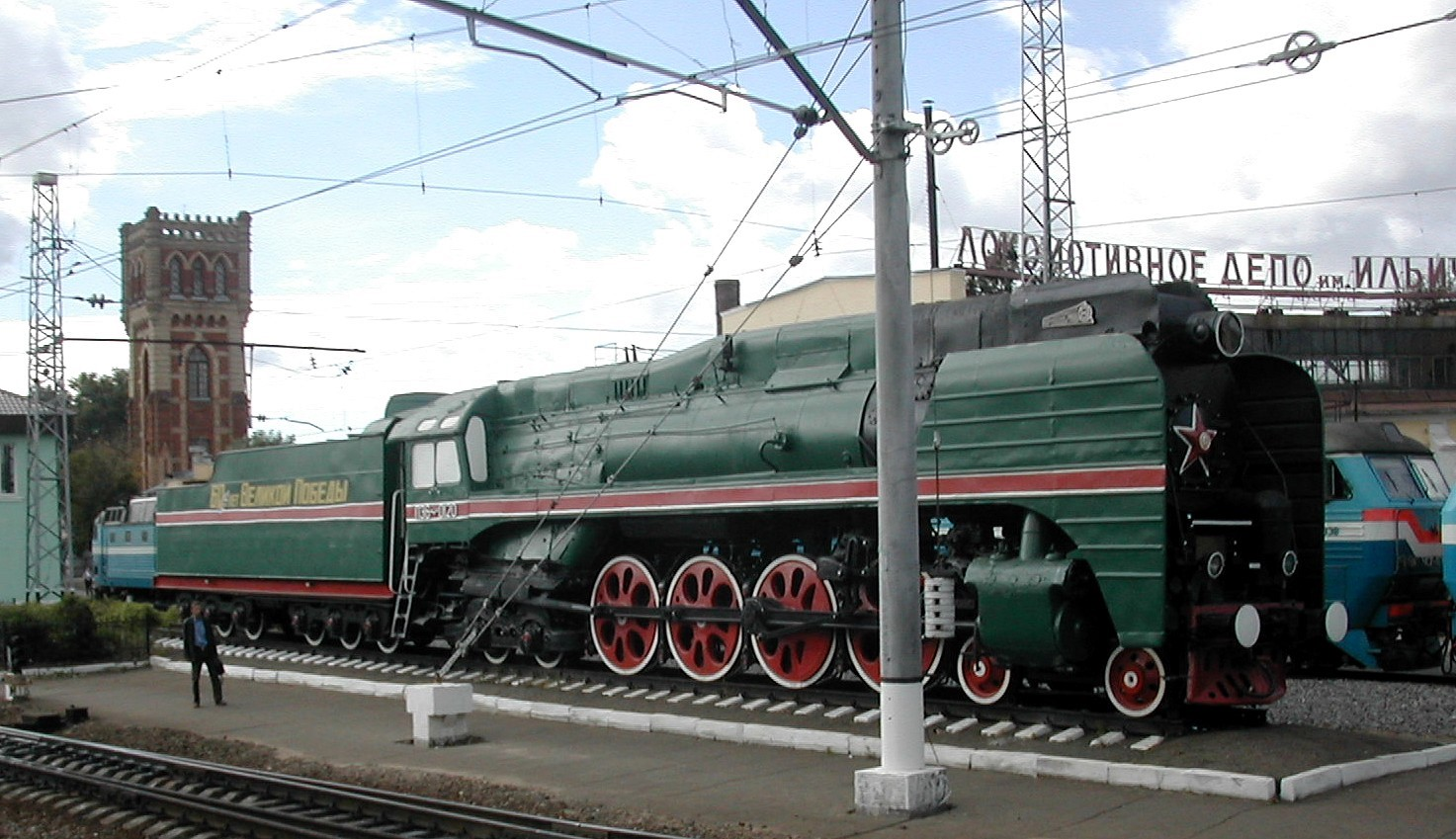
P36-0120 on display at Ilyich Depot

- P36-0091 - Skovorodino, Amur Oblast, Russia
- P36-0094 - Bilohirsk, Amur Oblast
- P36-0111 - Orsha, Vitebsk Oblast, Belarus
- P36-0124 - Chernishevsk locomotive depot, Transbaikalia, Russia
- P36-0192 - Taiga Station, Kemerovo Oblast, Russia

=== Derelict ===
- P36-0058 - Zlatoust, Chelyabinsk Oblast, Russia

== See also ==
- History of rail transport in Russia
- Russian Railway Museum, Saint Petersburg
