= Soviet locomotive class AA20 =

One-off Soviet 4-14-4 steam locomotive

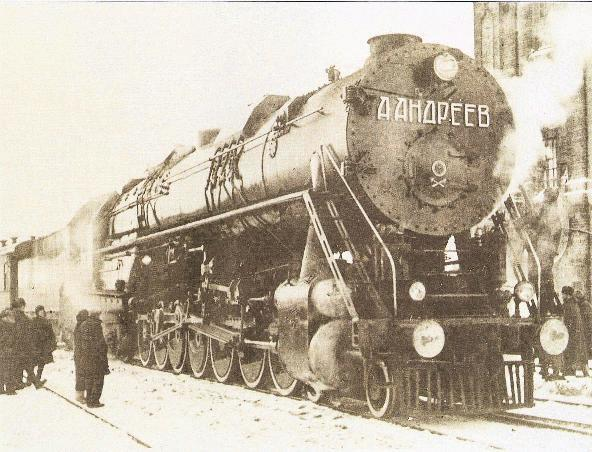
- А. Андреев, the only 4-14-4 locomotive ever built
Type and origin
- Power type: Steam
- Builder: Krupp; Voroshilovgrad Locomotive Factory
- Build date: 1934
- Total produced: 1
Specifications
- Configuration
  - Whyte: 4-14-4 (proposed as a 2-14-4)
  - UIC: 2'G2' h2
- Gauge: 1,524 mm (5 ft)
- Leading dia.: 760 mm (29.92 in)
- Driver dia.: 1,600 mm (62.99 in)
- Trailing dia.: 1,050 mm (41.34 in)
- Length: 33,730 mm (110.66 ft)
- Axle load: 20 t (20 long tons; 22 short tons)
- Fuel type: Coal
- Firebox
  - Grate area: 12 m^{2} (130 sq ft)
- Boiler pressure: 17 kgf/cm^{2} (1.67 MPa; 242 psi)
- Superheater
  - Heating area: 174 m^{2} (1,870 sq ft)
- Cylinders: Two, outside
- Cylinder size: 740 mm × 810 mm (29.13 in × 31.89 in) bore x stroke
Performance figures
- Maximum speed: 70 km/h (43 mph)
- Tractive effort: 320 kN (71,940 lbf)
Career
- Operators: Soviet Railways
- Locale: Soviet Union
- First run: 1935
- Scrapped: 1960
- Disposition: Scrapped

The SZD Class AA20 was a one-off experimental 4-14-4 steam locomotive constructed in the Soviet Union by Krupp and the Voroshilovgrad Locomotive Factory in 1934 for the Sovetskie Zheleznye Dorogi (SŽD). Two locomotives were set to be built, but due to the construction of the railway's more successful and widespread FD Class, only AA20-1 was built, leaving the second AA20 incomplete.

== Wheel arrangement ==
Under the Whyte notation for the classification of steam locomotives, 4-14-4 represents the wheel arrangement of four leading wheels, fourteen coupled driving wheels (seven axles) in a rigid frame, and four trailing wheels.

Equivalent classifications in other notations would have been:

- AAR classification: 2-G-2
- UIC classification: 2'G2' (also known as German classification and Italian classification)
- French classification: 272
- Turkish classification: 711
- Swiss classification: 7/11
- Russian classification: 2-7-2

== History ==
=== Prerequisites for the appearance of a steam locomotive ===
By the 1930s On Soviet railways, the requirements for traction and train speed increased significantly. The existing steam locomotives of type 0-5-0 (series E) and type 1-5-0 (series Ye), the adhesion weight of which did not exceed 85 tons, were no longer able to fully cope with the increased volume of transportation. There was an urgent need to replace them with much more powerful locomotives.

Different groups of specialists proposed different solutions. Some suggested leaving five driving wheel pairs on the locomotive and only increasing the load from the axle on the rails, while strengthening the railway track. Others insisted on keeping the load from the driving wheel sets within 20 tons, while increasing their number. Both groups of specialists did not take into account that at that time the cars were mainly equipped with a screw harness ( automatic couplers on Soviet railways would be installed en masse only in 1934), which could withstand a force not exceeding 20 tf.

A significant motivating factor in the creation of the Soviet steam locomotive type 2-7-2 was the experience of German and mainly North American locomotive building, in the creation of steam locomotives with six moving axles in one rigid frame, respectively, types: 1-6-0 and 2-6-1.

The technical assignment, issued in the spring of 1930, for an alternative preliminary design of a Soviet high-speed freight steam locomotive, with more than five moving axles in one rigid frame, provided for a maximum axial load on the rails of 20 tons, that is, the same as for the preliminary design of a Soviet steam locomotive type 1-5-1 (which would later become the class FD), which significantly complicated the task for designers. If for the high-speed American type 2-6-1 with an average design axle load from the driving wheel pair on the rail - 26.9 tons - back in 1926, it was possible to successfully implement the specified traction and speed characteristics, then for the high-speed Soviet design version, taking into account given axial load - 20 tons, the number of driving axles had to be increased to seven... At the same time, inevitably, according to the conditions for ensuring fit into the curves, The design of the driving mechanism and crew part became even more complicated. However, the acquisition of practical experience in solving such a complex technical problem was considered appropriate for the young Soviet school of locomotive building, in terms of the implementation of an unusually large-sized locomotive boiler and crew part with seven coupling axles - an absolute record in the practice of world locomotive building.

=== Design and manufacture of a steam locomotive ===
In 1931, a group of young engineers, graduates of MIIT, prepared a preliminary design of a steam locomotive with a 1-7-2 wheel arrangement and a rail load not exceeding 20 t from the wheel pair. In theory, such a locomotive should have provided maximum carrying capacity and significantly reduced the cost of transportation due to the possibility of using low-grade coal and eliminating the use of articulated locomotives. At the same time, the load on the rails, which does not go beyond the standards, would allow the use of such locomotives without special reinforcement of the tracks. The driving wheels of the locomotive with a diameter of 1550 mm were located in one rigid frame.

Working drawings of the new locomotive were already drawn up at the Voroshilovgrad Locomotive Plant, which was given the task by the NKPS to manufacture two locomotives of this type. However, during the detailed design it turned out that when using the 1-7-2 wheel formula it would not be possible to withstand the weight restrictions, so it was decided to switch to the 2-7-2 type. In addition to changing the wheel formula, the project has undergone a number of other changes. In particular, the diameter of the cylinders was increased from 735 to 740 mm, and the area of the grate was increased from 10 m^{2} to 12 m^{2}. The steam pressure in the boiler should have been 17 kgf/cm^{2}. The locomotive received a radial boiler firebox, a timber frame and a steam superheater of the Chusov system.

The production of the locomotive at the plant proceeded slowly, largely due to the fact that at the same time the plant was mastering the mass production of FD type 1-5-1 steam locomotives. For the same reasons, it was decided to abandon the production of a second locomotive. The locomotive was ready only at the end of 1934. The new locomotive received the letter designation AA (in honor of Andrey Andreyevich Andreyev, who held the post of People's Commissar of the NKPS in 1931–1935) and the full designation of the locomotive AA20-1 (20 is the load from the moving wheelsets on the rails in tons).

=== Adhesion weight ===
The locomotive's weight was 140 tons, the cylinder diameter was 735 mm, and the piston stroke was 812 mm. The area of the grate was 10 m^{2}, and the evaporating heating surface of the boiler was 445 m^{2}. Much of the calculation work on the crew section was carried out by engineer K.P. Korolev, a future major specialist in the field of locomotive dynamics, the author of many books.

=== Design features ===
The AA steam locomotive was the first and only locomotive in the world history with seven driving axles in one rigid frame. The steam locomotive's boiler was one of the largest locomotive boilers in Europe. Due to the sheer size of the locomotive, a number of measures were taken to improve the curve fit of the locomotive. In particular, the front bogie was able to deviate from the longitudinal axis of the locomotive within ± 145 mm (at the extreme points), the rear bogie - within ± 265 mm. The clearance of the first and second wheelsets was ± 27 mm, the seventh ± 35 mm. In addition, the wheels of the third, fourth and fifth pairs were flangeless, and the width of their bands was 175 mm.

The locomotive was also distinguished by an original system of force transmission from the steam engine piston rod to the driving wheelsets. Thus, on a conventional steam locomotive the tractive force is transmitted to one of the axles (leading wheelset), and from it through drawbars directly to all other moving axles. On the AA locomotive the tractive force was transmitted to the fourth driving axle, and from there the tractive force was directly transmitted to the first three coupling axles. This axle was also connected to the fifth wheelset by a special drawbar, and the sixth and seventh axles were driven directly from the fifth driving axle.

== See also ==
- History of rail transport in Russia
- Russian Railway Museum, Saint Petersburg
