= China Railways FD =

Class of Chinese steam locomotives

FD
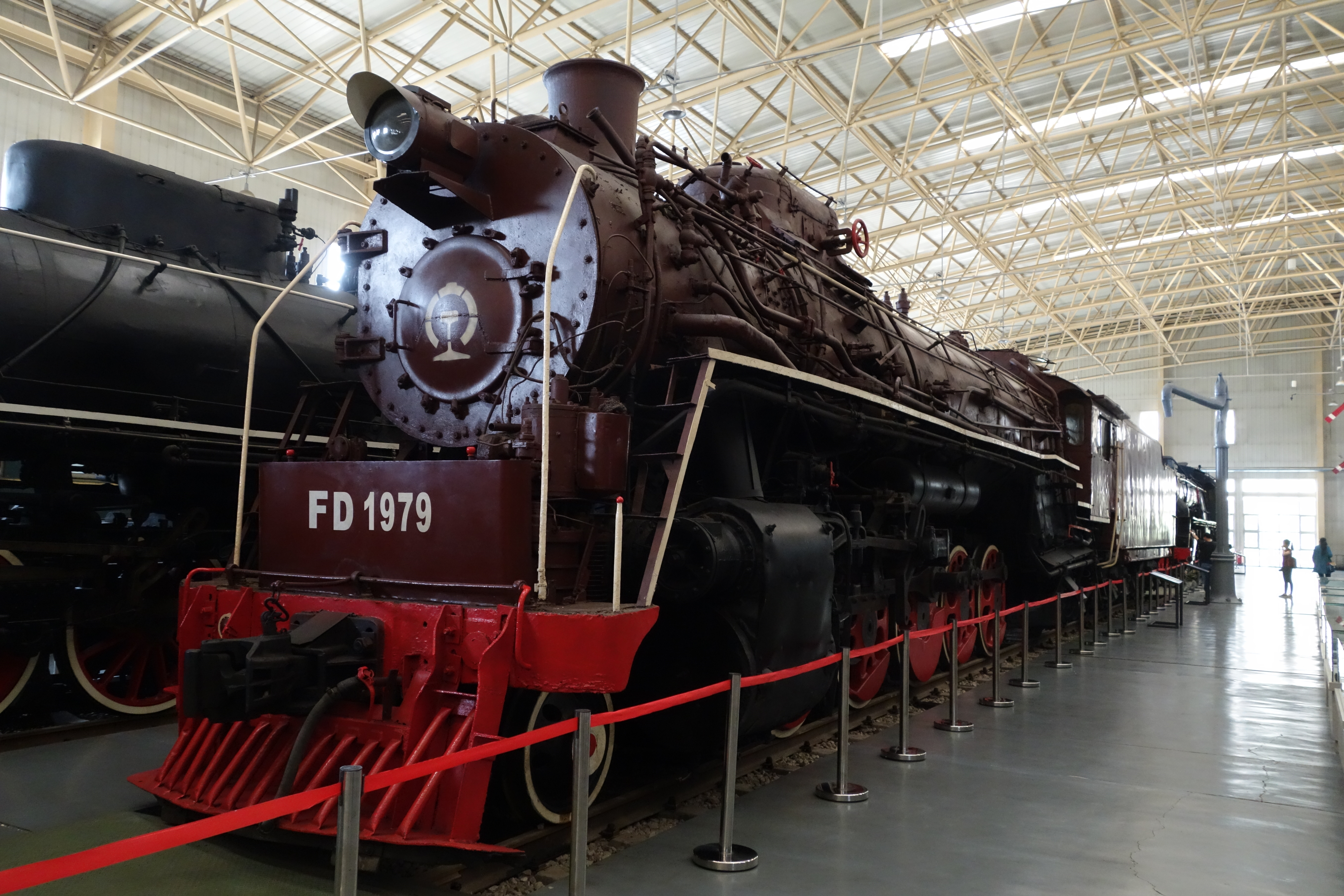
- FD-1979 at the China Railway Museum
Type and origin
- Power type: Steam
- Builder: Voroshilovgrad Locomotive Factory
- Build date: 1931–41, conversion to standard gauge : ~1958
- Total produced: exported to China : 1,054
Specifications
- Configuration
  - Whyte: 2-10-2
- Gauge: 1,435 mm (4 ft 8 1/2 in)
- Driver dia.: 1,500 mm (59.06 in)
- Length: total: ≈29.07 m (95 ft 4 in) (loco + tender)
- Fuel type: Coal
- Firebox
  - Grate area: 7.03 m^{2} (75.7 sq ft)
- Cylinders: Two, outside
- Valve gear: Walschaerts
- Valve type: Piston valves
- Loco brake: Air
- Train brakes: Air
- Couplers: Knuckle
Performance figures
- Maximum speed: 85 km/h (53 mph)
Career
- Operators: China Railway
- Number in class: 1,054
- Numbers: 1001–2004, 2201–2250
- Retired: 1967–1985
- Preserved: 3
- Scrapped: 1967–1989
- Disposition: 3 preserved, most remainder scrapped

The China Railways FD class of locomotives were 2-10-2 "Santa Fe" type steam locomotives of the FD locomotive type imported from the Soviet Union and regauged for use in China.

== History ==
The FD class locomotives were imported from the Soviet Union to China from 1958 to provide main line freight motive power for the Chinese railways. Over 1000 units were acquired and remained in service until 1985.

When imported the class were designated YH (YouHao meaning 'friendship'), but after the breakdown of Sino-Soviet relations during the Cultural Revolution (see Sino–Soviet split) the class were renamed FX (FanXiu meaning 'anti-revisionist'). In 1971 the class were returned to the original Soviet designation of 'FD' (after Felix Dzerzhinsky).

== Preservation ==
- FD-1227 is preserved at the Shenyang Railway Museum.
- FD-1653 is preserved at the Baotou West Locomotive Depot, Hohhot Railway Bureau.
- FD-1979 is preserved at the Beijing Railway Museum.

== See also ==
- Soviet locomotive class FD
