= 2-3-2K =

Experimental Soviet locomotive

2-3-2K (P12)
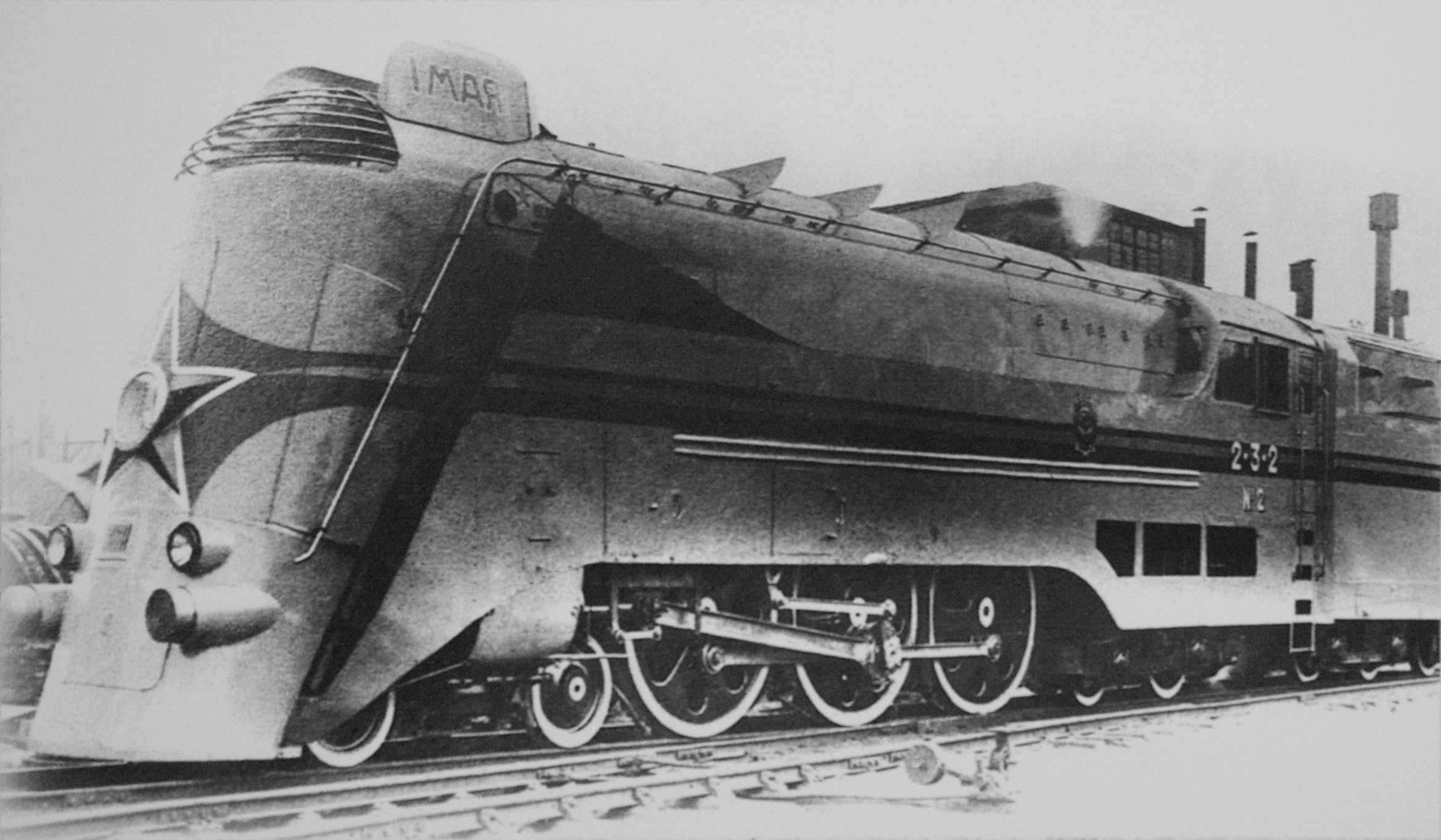
- Locomotive No. 2
Type and origin
- Power type: Steam
- Builder: Kolomna Works, Kolomna, Soviet Union
- Build date: 1937–1938
- Total produced: 2
Specifications
- Configuration
  - UIC: 2'C2'
- Gauge: 1,520 mm (60 in)
- Trailing dia.: 900 mm (35 in) / 1,050 mm (41 in)
- Carrying wheel diameter: 2,000 mm (79 in)
- Wheelbase: 11,930 mm (470 in)
- Length: 15,364 mm (604.9 in)
- Height: 4,760 mm (187 in)
- Axle load: 21.35 t (21.01 long tons; 23.53 short tons)
- Service weight: 123.5 t (121.5 long tons; 136.1 short tons)
- Firebox
  - Grate area: 6.5 m^{2} (70 sq ft)
- Boiler pressure: 15 at
- Superheater
  - Heating area: 124.5 m^{2} (1,340 sq ft) / 146.4 m^{2} (1,576 sq ft)
- Cylinder size: 580 mm (23 in)
- Piston stroke: 700 mm (28 in)
Performance figures
- Maximum speed: 150 km/h (93 mph)

The 2-3-2K (factory designation P12, Russian: П12) was an experimental steam locomotive built in the Soviet Union for hauling express passenger trains. Designed at the Kolomna Works in Kolomna, two examples were constructed between 1937 and 1938. They operated express services before World War II.

== Design and construction ==
The P12 factory-type locomotive was developed at the Kolomna Works in Kolomna as an experimental high-speed machine for express passenger trains. At the time, the new mass-produced Soviet express locomotive IS had a design speed of 115 km/h. After evaluating various wheel arrangements, engineers selected the 2'C2' configuration, denoted as 2-3-2 in Russian notation. Initial plans called for driving wheels of 1,850 mm diameter for a design speed of 130 km/h, but these were enlarged to 2,000 mm, raising the design speed to 150 km/h. The design was completed between 1935 and 1936 under the leadership of engineers L. Lebedyansky and M. Shchukin. The People's Commissariat of Transport ordered two units. The locomotives received no official railway designation but are known in literature as 2-3-2K to distinguish them from the similar 2-3-2V built in Luhansk. The first locomotive was completed on 7 November 1937, and the second on 1 May 1938 – dates aligned with Soviet holidays marking the 20th anniversary of the October Revolution and International Workers' Day.

Efforts were made to minimise weight, particularly in the running gear, using disc wheels, stamped pistons, and alloy steel. To reduce rolling resistance, rolling-element bearings were fitted to the axles of both locomotive and tender. Streamlined casing lowered aerodynamic drag. All wheels on the locomotives and tenders were braked for improved stopping power. The first locomotive received a new L40 superheater with large-diameter tubes, while the second used an Elesko-E superheater (as on FD and IS locomotives) for comparison, resulting in differing boiler parameters. In service, the L40 proved more efficient and economical. A drawback compared to the 2-3-2V was the lack of parts standardisation with existing production locomotives. In 1940, a booster engine was installed on the trailing truck of No. 1, improving starting and low-speed hill climbing.

== Service ==
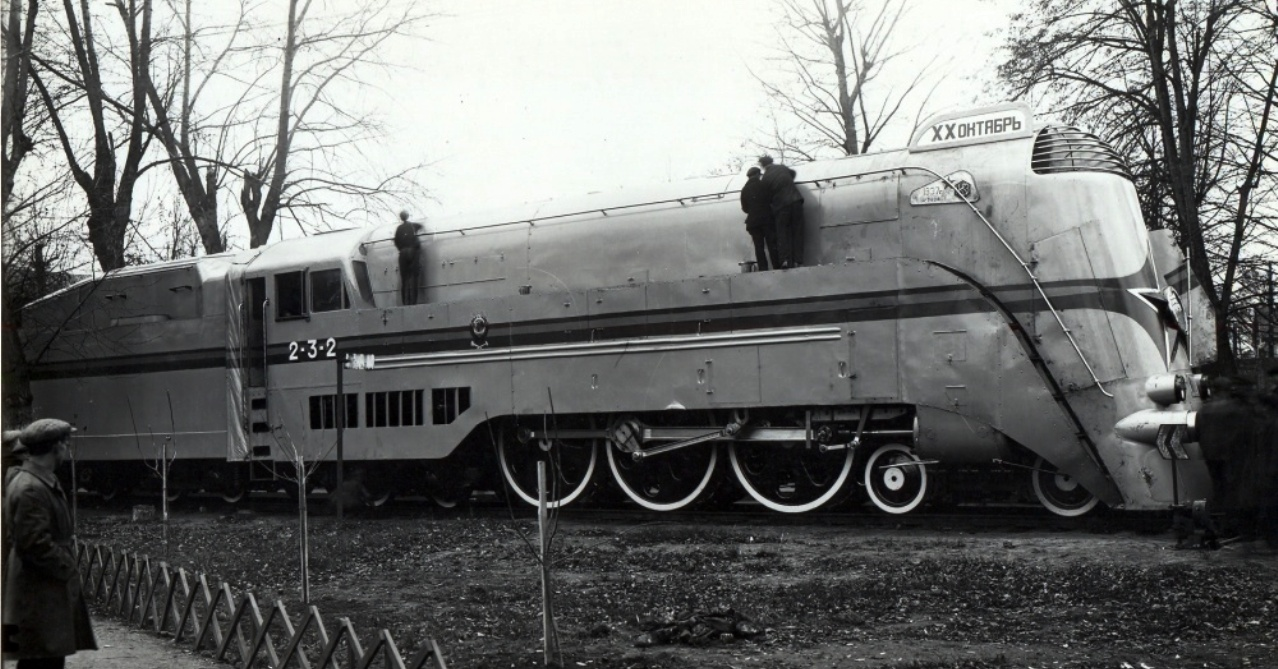
Locomotive No. 1

In 1938, the first locomotive underwent extensive testing, achieving 3,070 hp at 149.2 km/h. On 24 April 1938, it reached 160 km/h. On 29 June 1938, with a special four-car train, it set a Soviet steam record of 170 km/h between Likhoslavl and Kalinin.

Both locomotives entered service on the October Railway, hauling fast and express passenger trains. They operated the Krasnaya Strela (Red Arrow) express between Leningrad and Moscow, reducing journey time to 8 hours. On one occasion, to recover lost time, a 2-3-2K covered the 331 km from Bologoye to Moscow in 3 hours. Timetables, however, were geared to slower S^{u} locomotives, preventing optimal operation and increasing fuel consumption by 10–12%. Before World War II, plans called for faster express schedules and an order for 10 more units from Kolomna, but the German invasion halted production. Between 1938 and 1940, the locomotives covered about 170,000 km.

Post-war, they were limited to 70 km/h. Streamlined casing, trailing-wheel brakes, and the booster on No. 1 were removed for easier maintenance, reducing service weight to 115 t and adhesive weight to 57 t.

== Bibliography ==
- Rakov, Vitaly (1995). Lokomotivy otechestvennykh zheleznykh dorog 1845–1955 Локомотивы отечественных железных дорог 1845–1955 [Locomotives of the Domestic Railways 1845–1955] (in Russian). ISBN 5-277-00821-7.
