= Soviet locomotive class L =

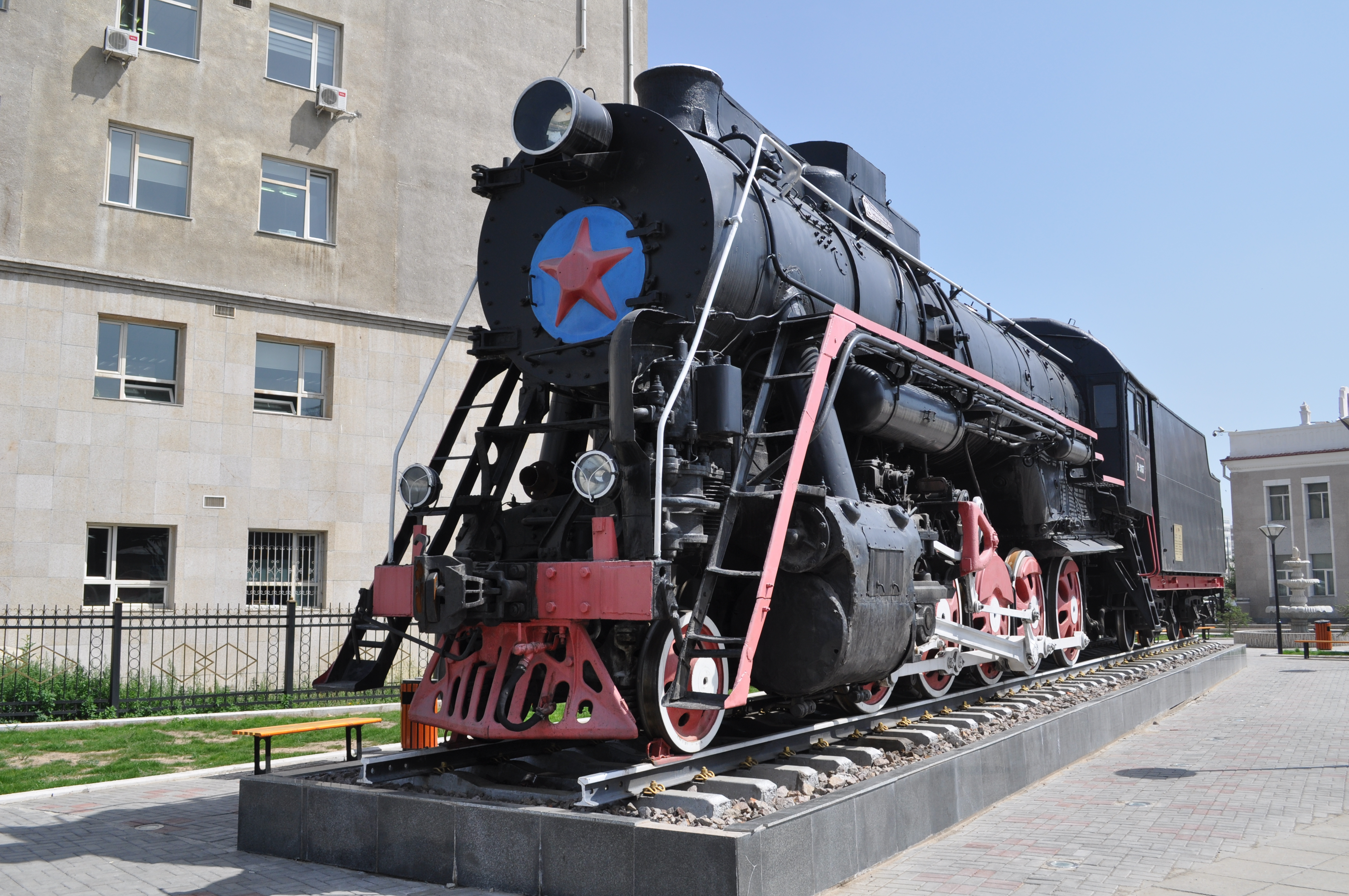
- Locomotive L-3167 at the Dund Goal Railroad Museum, Ulaanbaatar, Mongolia
Type and origin
- Power type: Steam
- Designer: L.S. Lebedyanskiy
- Builder: Kolomna Locomotive Works
- Build date: 1945—1955
- Total produced: 4,199
Specifications
- Configuration
  - Whyte: 2-10-0
- Driver dia.: 1,500 mm (59.06 in)
- Height: 4,873 mm (15.99 ft)
- Axle load: 18 t (18 long tons; 20 short tons)
- Fuel type: Coal
- Firebox
  - Grate area: 6 m^{2} (65 sq ft)
- Boiler pressure: 14 kgf/cm^{2} (1.37 MPa; 199 psi)
- Superheater
  - Heating area: 113 m^{2} (1,220 sq ft)
- Cylinders: Two, outside
- Cylinder size: 650 mm × 800 mm (25.59 in × 31.50 in) bore x stroke
- Valve gear: Walschaerts
Performance figures
- Maximum speed: 85 km/h (53 mph)
- Tractive effort: 271.5 kN (61,040 lbf)
Career
- Nicknames: Swan
- Locale: Soviet Union
- First run: 1945
- Retired: 1975-1995
- Scrapped: 1975-1991 (600), 1992-1995
- Disposition: Several hundred preserved

The Soviet locomotive class L (Russian: Л) was a Soviet main freight steam locomotive type. They were nicknamed Lebed, "Swan."

== Description ==
The L class 2-10-0 was the first Soviet locomotive to use Boxpok-type wheels, which were commonplace in steam locomotive design post-World War II. A casing between the dome and chimney covered a steam drier pipe.

== History ==
It was designed and built by the Kolomna Locomotive Works shortly after World War II under supervision by L.C. Lebedyanski. It was originally designated Class P (for Pobeda, "victory"), but was redesignated Class L in honor of its designer.

In conjunction with the FD class 2-10-2, it was primarily used to haul mainline goods across the terrain of the Soviet Union. Over 4,000 L class locomotives were constructed from 1945-1955, and they operated with the Soviet Railways until 1975.

Today there are over 300 example of L class locomotives surviving in various states of repair in the former Soviet Union, constituting the single largest surviving class of locomotives in the world. At least 33 are still in operating condition. 3167 is preserved at the Dund Goal Railroad Museum in Ulaanbaatar, Mongolia

== See also ==
- History of rail transport in Russia
- Russian Railway Museum, Saint Petersburg
