= Brest Railway Museum =

Museum in Brest, Belarus

Coordinates: 52°05′08″N 23°40′19″E

- Брэсцкі чыгуначны музей
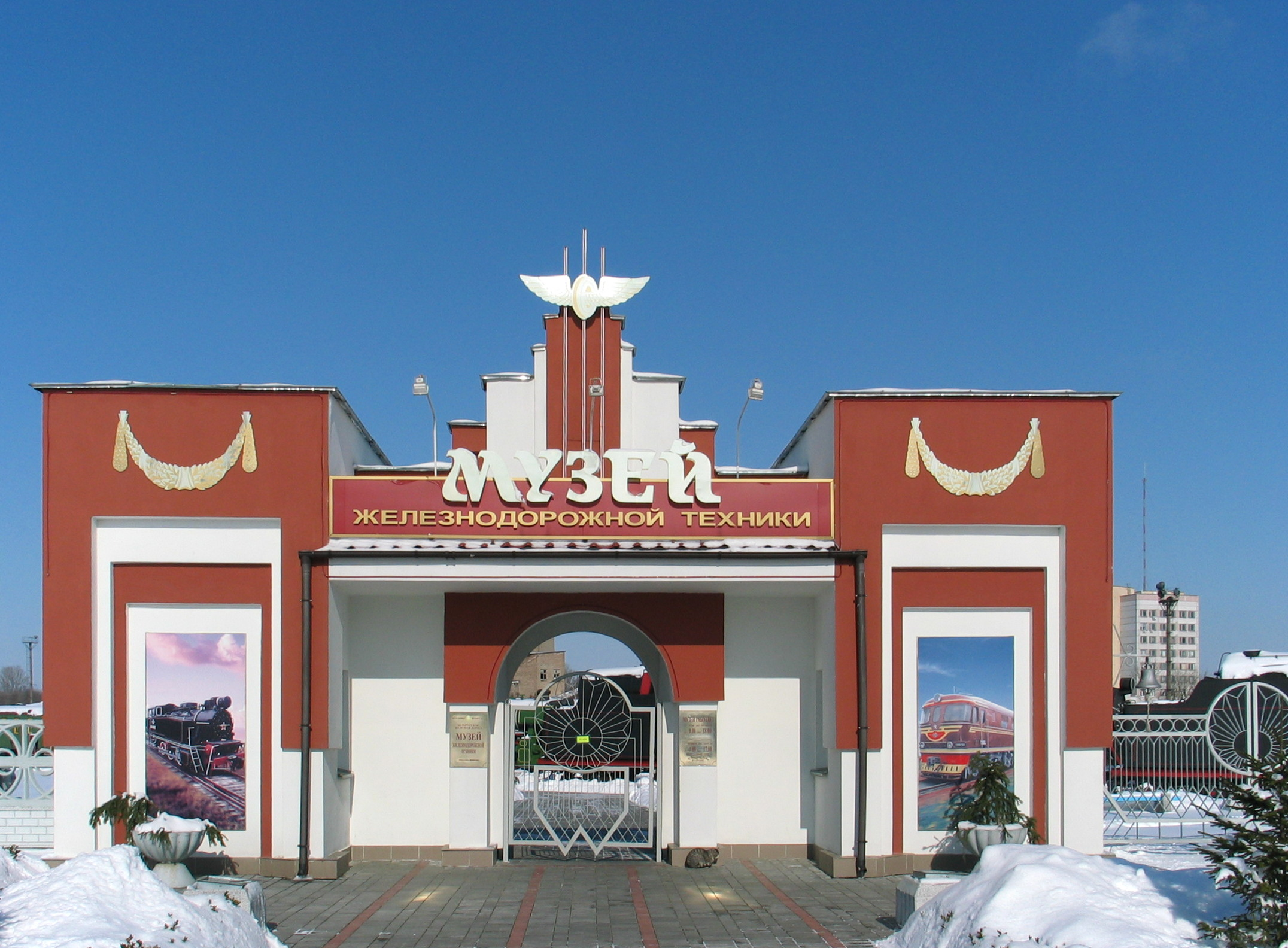
- Museum entrance
- Established: 2002
- Location: 2 Masherova str, Brest, Belarus
- Website: https://web.archive.org/web/20130122001917/http://www.brest.rw.by/social_sphere/brest_museum/ (Russian)

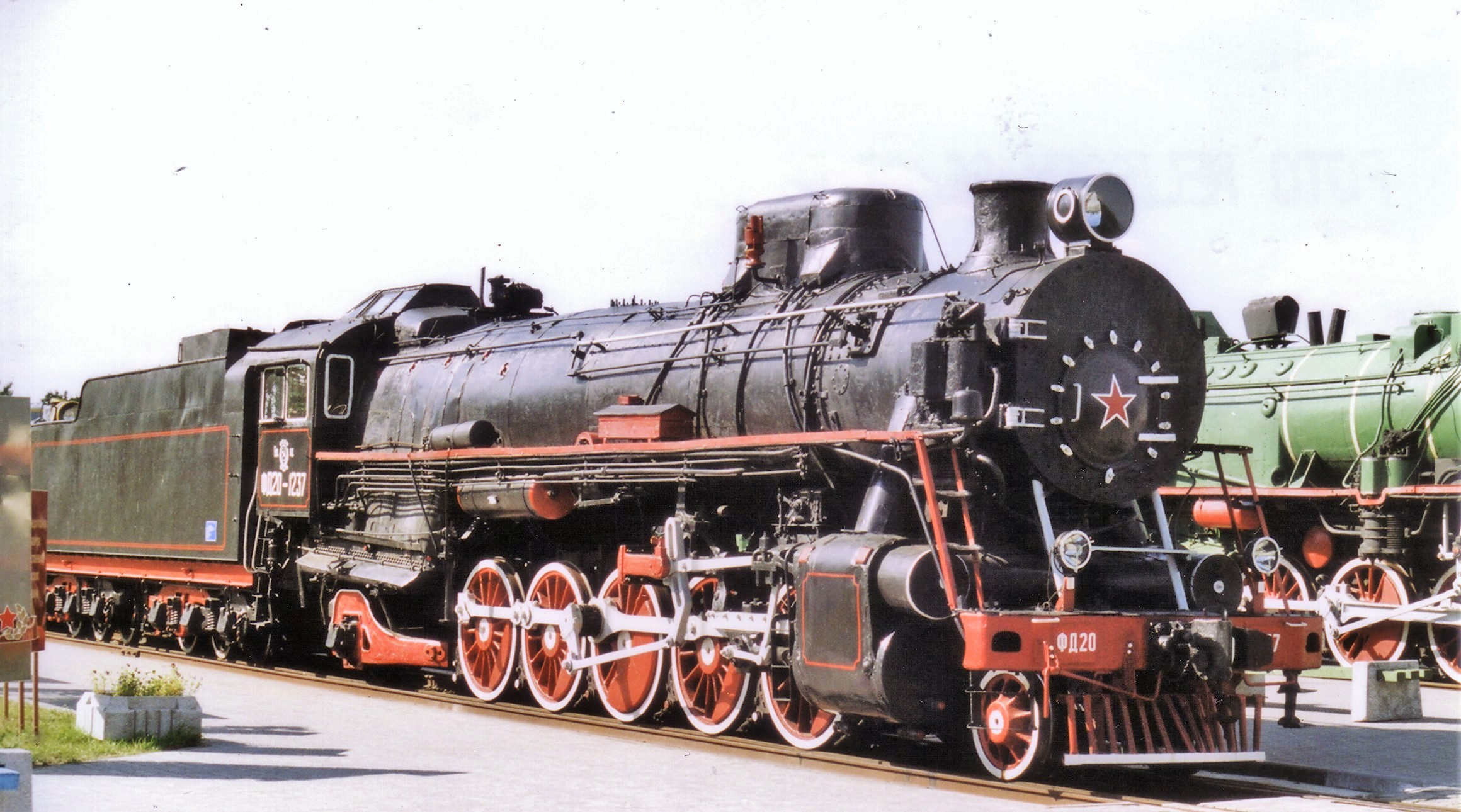
A Felix Dzerzhinsky steam locomotive on display

The Brest Railway Museum or Brest Museum of Rail Equipment (Belarusian: Брэсцкі чыгуначны музей, romanized: Brescki čyhunačny muziej) is an outdoor railway museum in Belarus, located in Brest. The museum was opened on 5 May 2002.

== Collection ==
With the first railway line in Brest opening in the 1870s, there is a rich railway history. The museum's collection consists of over 50 units of rolling stock, including the oldest, an Eu No. 699-45 series built in 1905. They also hold a number of German Kriegslokomotive 2-10-0s. The collection includes vintage steam locomotives, diesel locomotives, steam cranes, and track mechanisms, with engines that use both standard and wide gauge tracks.

In addition, several Retro passenger carriages are present. The engines are displayed on three outdoor tracks, totaling a little over 1 kilometre (0.62 mi) in length. There are also period station clocks, lamps and station bells etc. to set the scene. It is still the only outdoor railway museum in Belarus. There is also an indoor pavilion with a large collection of photos and memorabilia documenting Brest's station and railway over the years. The museum in total covers 29,000m².

Visitors can interact with the trains by going inside them, sitting in seats, and pressing buttons. The trains in the museum are often used for shooting films, and the museum is used as the location for festivals.
