= Russian locomotive class A =

Russian steam locomotives

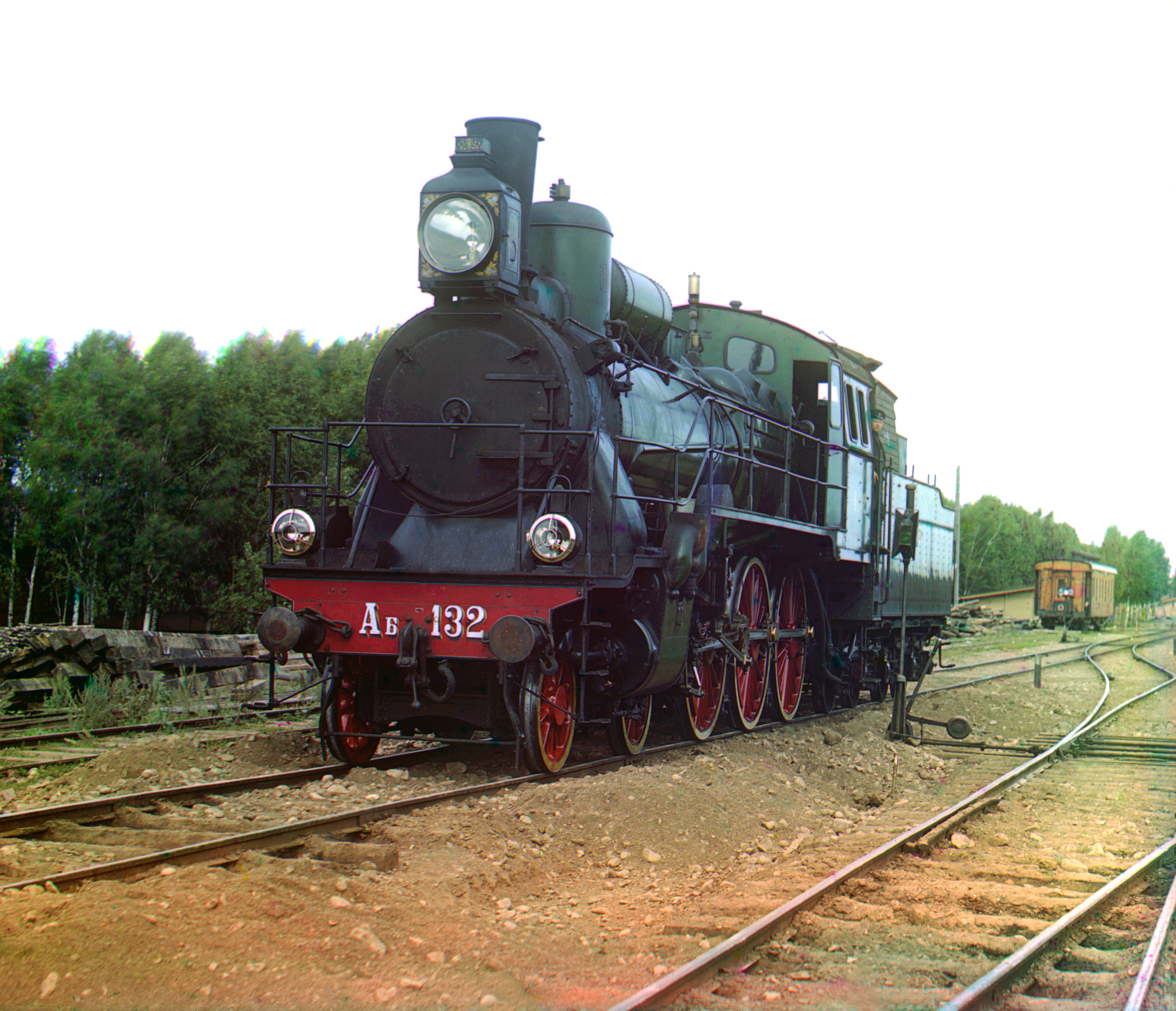
- Ab 132, which had been converted to a class B in 1912.
Type and origin
- Power type: Steam
- Builder: Kolomna Locomotive Works; Hanomag; Henschel & Son; Sormovo Works; Voroshilovgrad Locomotive Works; Kharkov Locomotive Factory
- Build date: 1892, 1894-1907
- Total produced: 533
Specifications
- Configuration
  - Whyte: 4-6-0
- Gauge: 1,524 mm (5 ft)
- Leading dia.: 1,030 mm (3 ft 5 in)
- Driver dia.: 1,830 mm (6 ft 0 in)
- Length: 10.437 m (34 ft 2.9 in)
- Axle load: 13.8–14 t (13.6–13.8 long tons; 15.2–15.4 short tons)
- Empty weight: 58 t (57 long tons; 64 short tons)
- Service weight: 60.3 t (59.3 long tons; 66.5 short tons); 63.5 t (62.5 long tons; 70.0 short tons)
- Firebox
  - Grate area: 1.85 m^{2} (2,870 sq in)
- Cylinders: Two, outside
- Cylinder size: 500 mm × 710 mm (20 in × 28 in) or 500 mm × 730 mm (20 in × 29 in)
Performance figures
- Maximum speed: 115 km/h (71 mph)
Career
- Operators: Russian Imperial Railways; Soviet Railways

The Russian locomotive class A was a series of Russian steam locomotives from the early 20th century, among the most powerful produced in the country at that time, with a top speed of 115 kilometers per hour.

One example, shown here, was the Ab type, with a Schmidt superheater, with the number between the couplers indicates Ab 132, produced at the Briansk locomotive factory in 1909.
