= Soviet locomotive class FD =

Class of Soviet locomotive

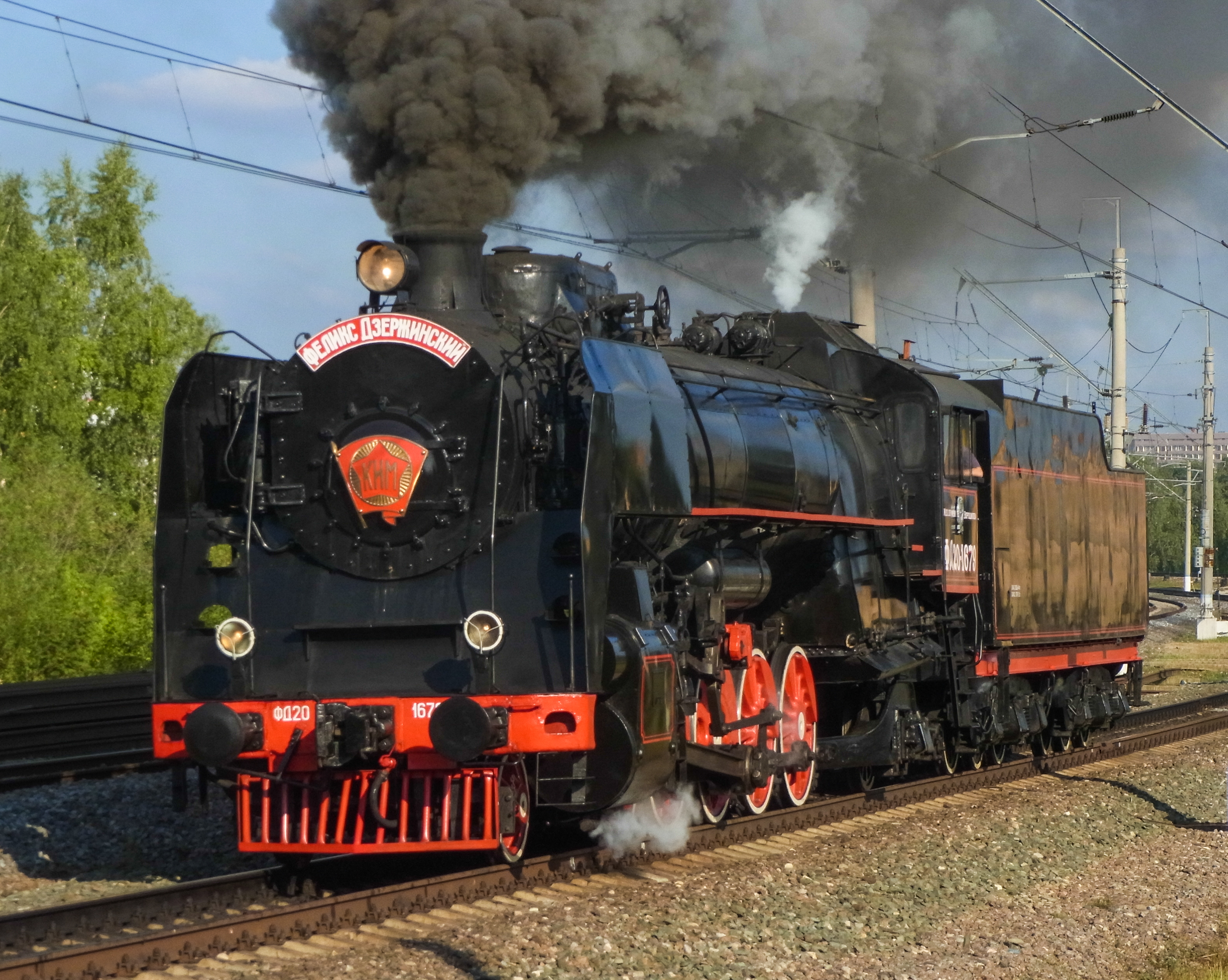
- Steam locomotive FD20-1679
Type and origin
- Power type: Steam
- Builder: October Revolution Locomotive Factory, Luhansk
- Build date: 1931—1942
- Total produced: 3213
Specifications
- Configuration
  - Whyte: 2-10-2
  - UIC: 1'E1 h2
- Gauge: 1,524 mm (5 ft) or 1,520 mm (4 ft 11 27/32 in) on the Russian Railways; 1,435 mm (4 ft 8 1/2 in) standard gauge on the China Railway
- Leading dia.: 900 mm (35.43 in)
- Driver dia.: 1,500 mm (59.06 in)
- Trailing dia.: 1,050 mm (41.34 in)
- Length: 15.974 m (52 ft 4 7/8 in) (w/o tender), 28.519 m (93 ft 6 3/4 in) (with tender)
- Adhesive weight: 104.0 t (102.4 long tons; 114.6 short tons)
- Loco weight: 134.4 Tonnes
- Total weight: 259.5 t (255.4 long tons; 286.0 short tons)
- Fuel type: Coal, oil (FD^{P})
- Firebox
  - Grate area: 7.04 m^{2} (75.8 sq ft)
- Boiler pressure: 15 kgf/cm^{2} (1.47 MPa; 213 psi)
- Cylinders: Two, outside
- Cylinder size: 670 mm × 770 mm (26.38 in × 30.31 in) bore x stroke
Performance figures
- Maximum speed: 85 km/h (53 mph)
- Power output: 3100 HP
- Tractive effort: 287.9 kN (64,720 lbf)
Career
- Operators: Soviet railways, China Railway, Korean State Railway
- Locale: Soviet Union, China, North Korea
- Retired: 1970-1992
- Scrapped: 1972-1995

The Soviet locomotive class FD (Russian: ФД; Ukrainian: Паровоз ФД, romanized: Parovoz FD) was a Soviet main freight steam locomotive type named after Felix Dzerzhinsky (Russian: Феликс Дзержинский; Ukrainian: Фелікс Дзержинський, romanized: Feliks Dzerzhynskyi). Between 1932 and 1942, 3,213 FD series locomotives were built.

== History ==
The locomotive was created in connection with the industrialization conducted in the USSR. Planning took only 100 days, and typical construction time was 170 days. For certain features the design engineers referred to American practice in steam locomotive design. The first locomotive was built at the October Revolution Locomotive Factory in Luhansk, Ukrainian SSR (Luhansk, Ukraine) in 1931 and sent for a show to Moscow.

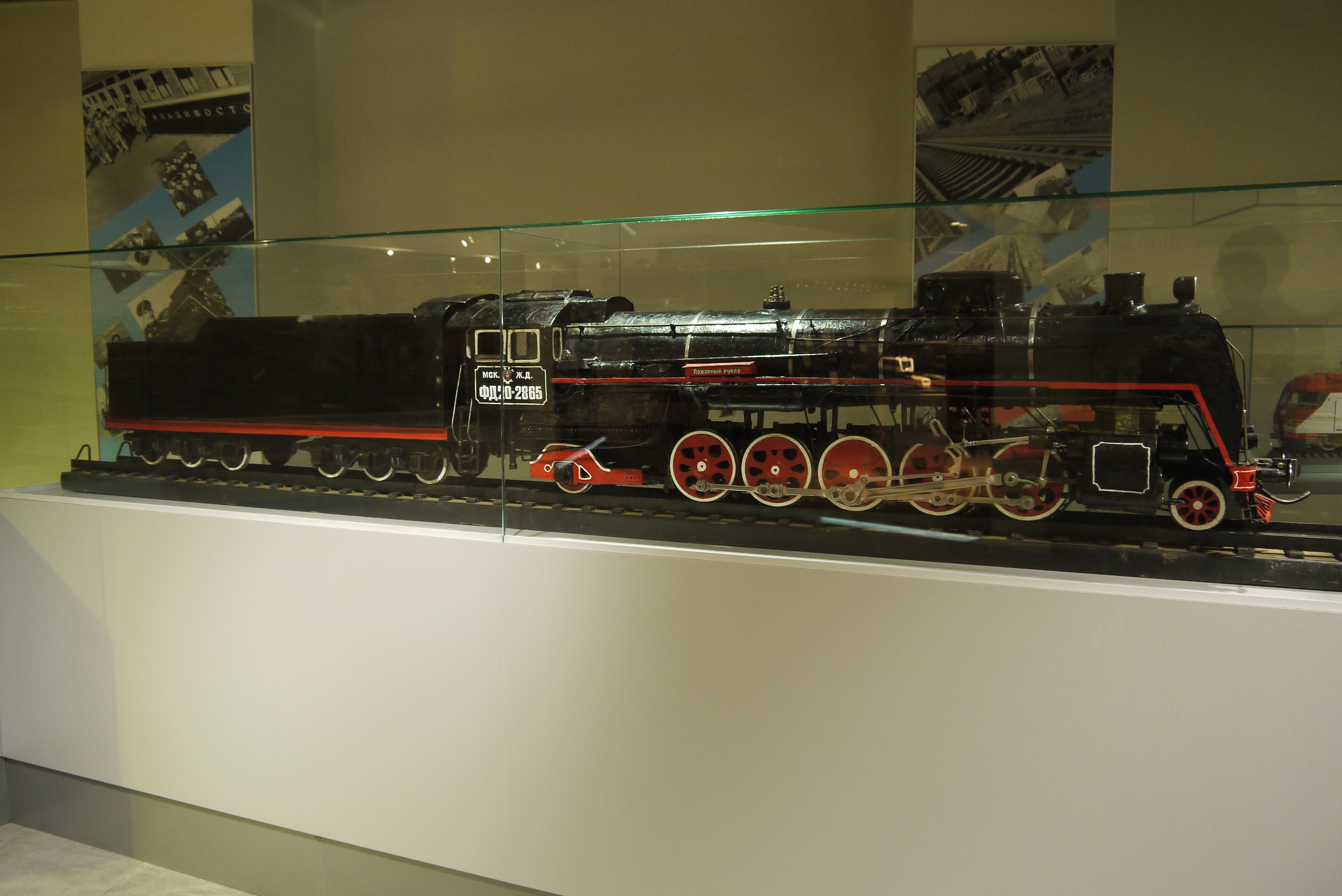
Scale Model of Russian Class FD locomotive number FD20-2865 at the Museum of the Moscow Railway at Paveletsky Rail Terminal

Tests, in which the locomotive performed well, were conducted in 1932. That same year, the Luhansk October Revolution plant began mass production of FD20 locomotives. Over the course of production their construction got better steadily. From the beginning of the Great Patriotic war in 1941, production was interrupted only in 1942; four locomotives were built in Ulan-Ude, Russian SFSR. Total production was 2927 locomotives of FD20 and 286 locomotives of FD21. The two subclasses only differed in the type of superheater.

The locomotives of FD operated in areas with high turnover of goods. They worked on 23 of 43 railways in the USSR, including in Siberia and in the Urals. From the middle of 1950, in connection with Soviet conversion to diesel and electric locomotives, the locomotives of FD began to be pushed aside from work. Also, in 1958–1960 about 1000 locomotives were transferred to China, as China Railway class FD; some of these were subsequently transferred from China to North Korea, where the Korean State Railway renumbered them in the 8500 series.

== Gallery ==
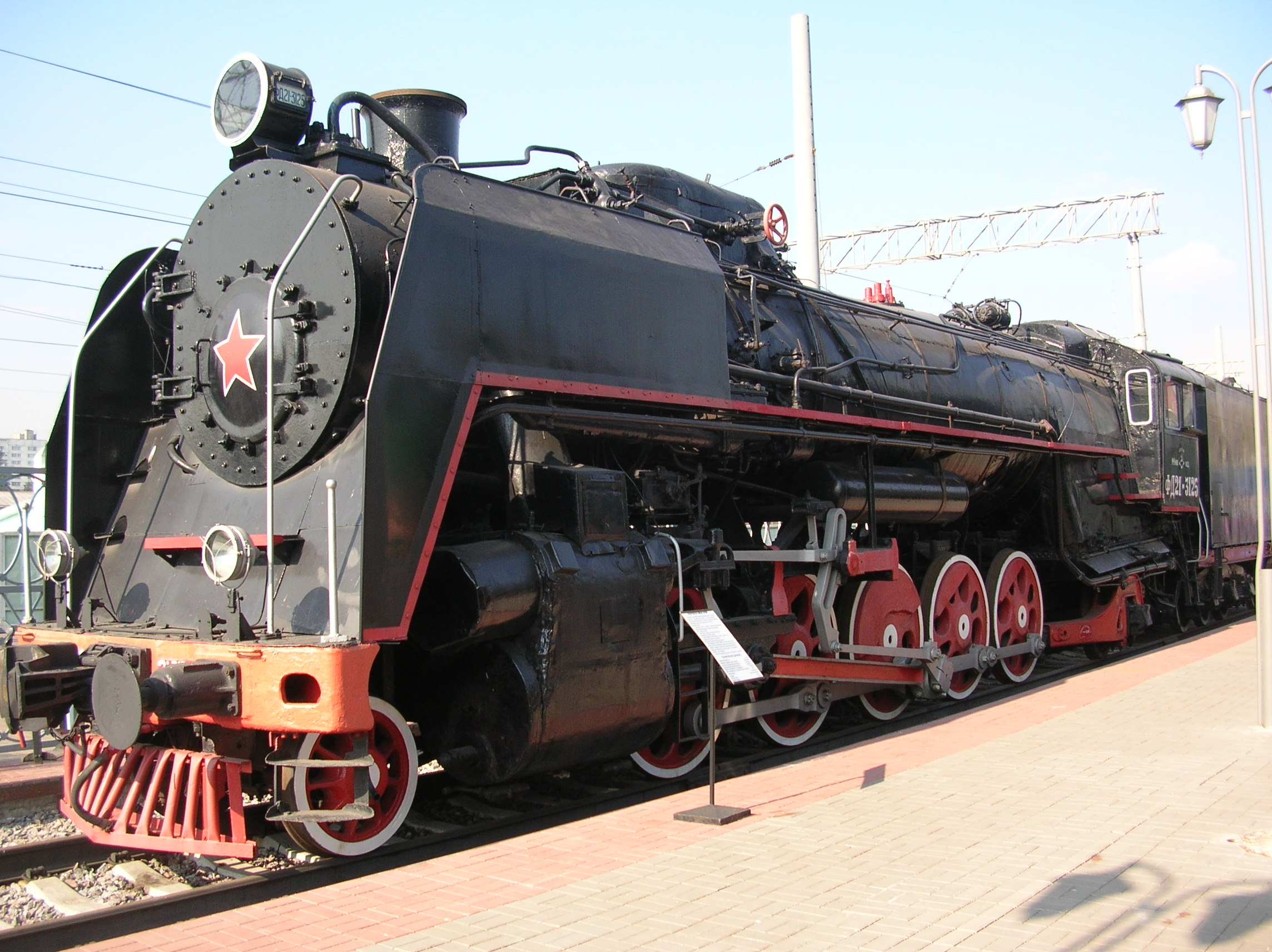
Russian locomotive class FD 21-3125 at Moscow Railway Museum at Rizhsky Rail Terminal

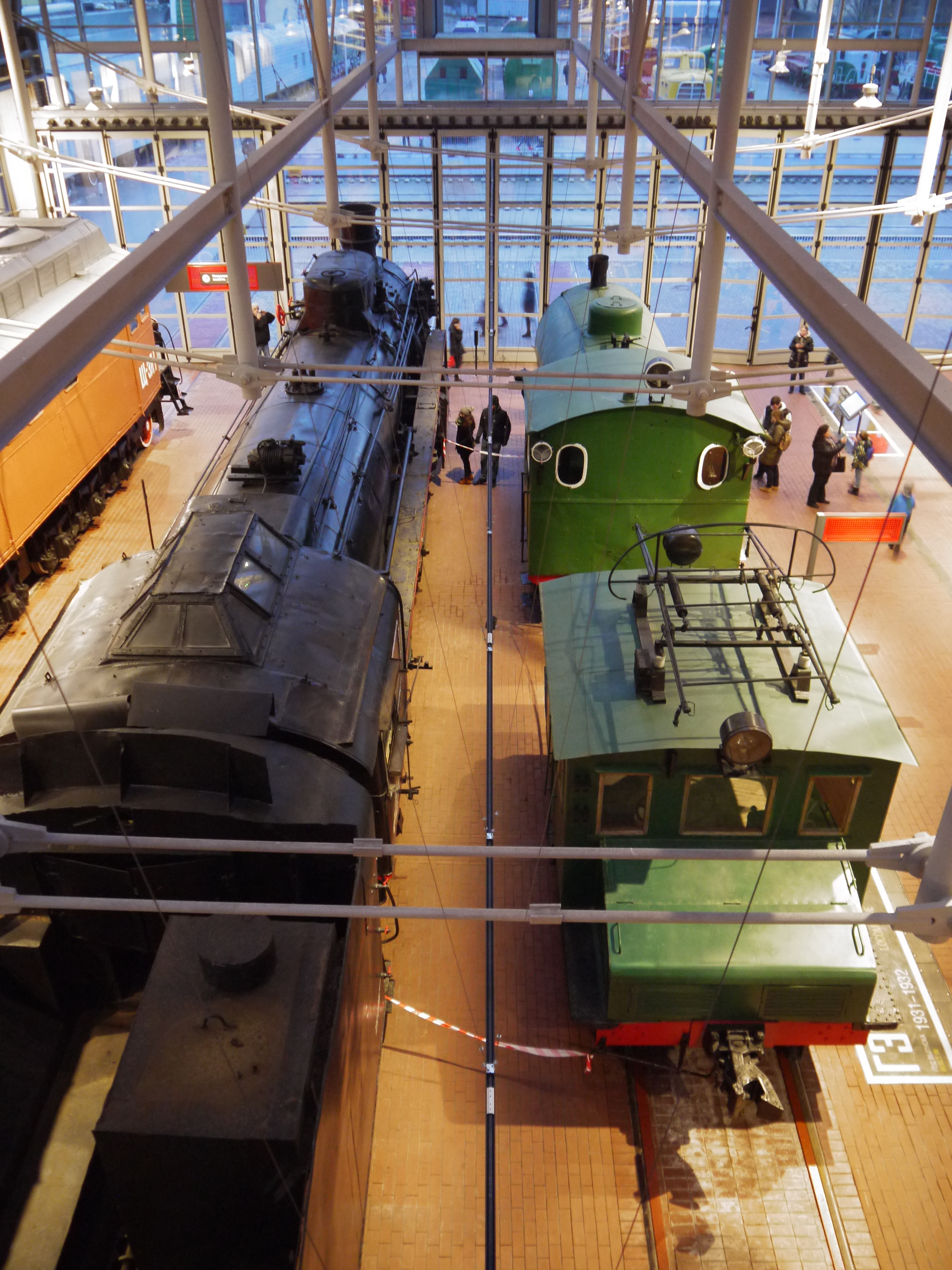
Russian locomotive class FD-1103 (on the left of the photo) at the Russian Railway Museum, St. Petersburg

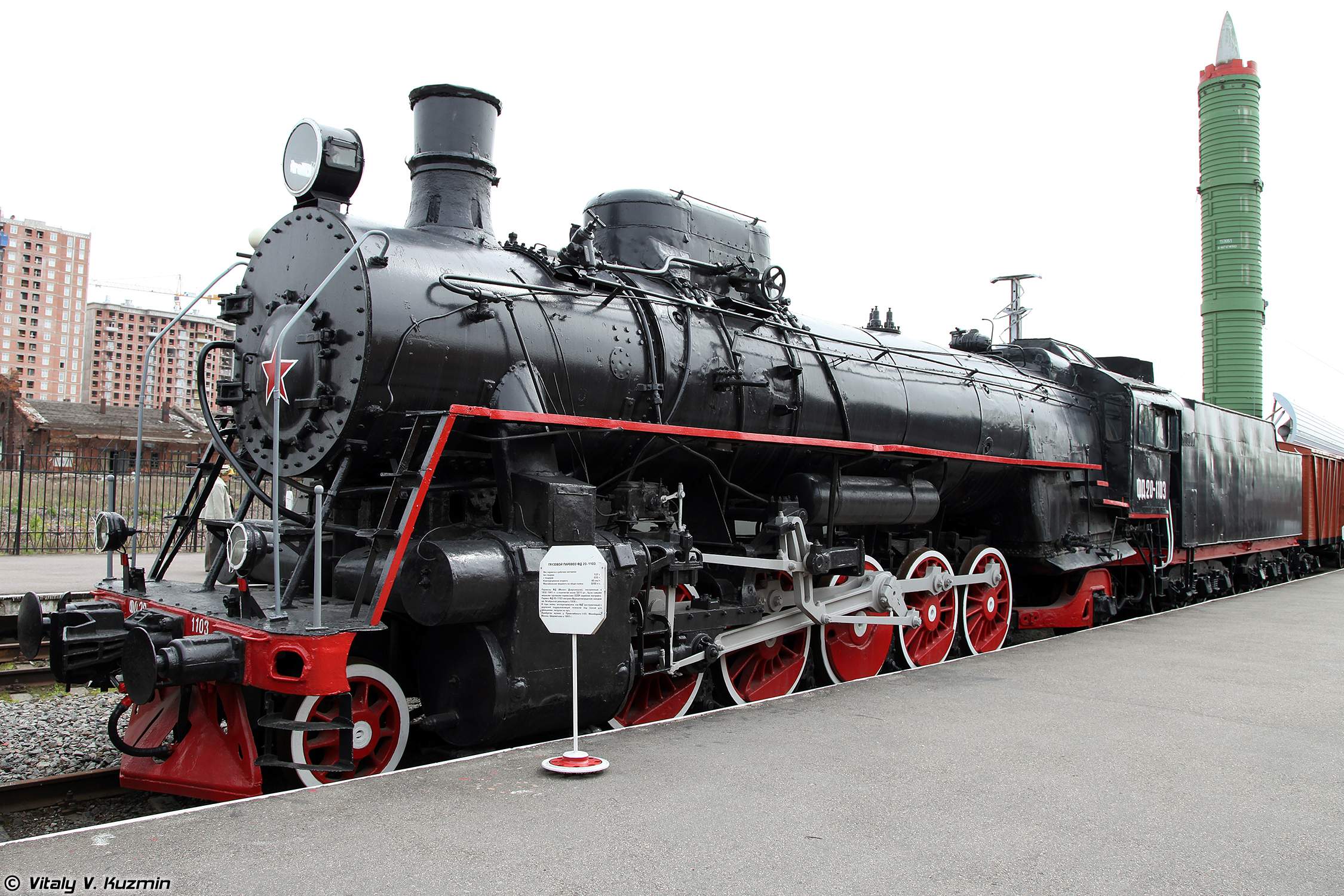
FD 20-1103 at Varshavsky Rail Terminal, St. Petersburg

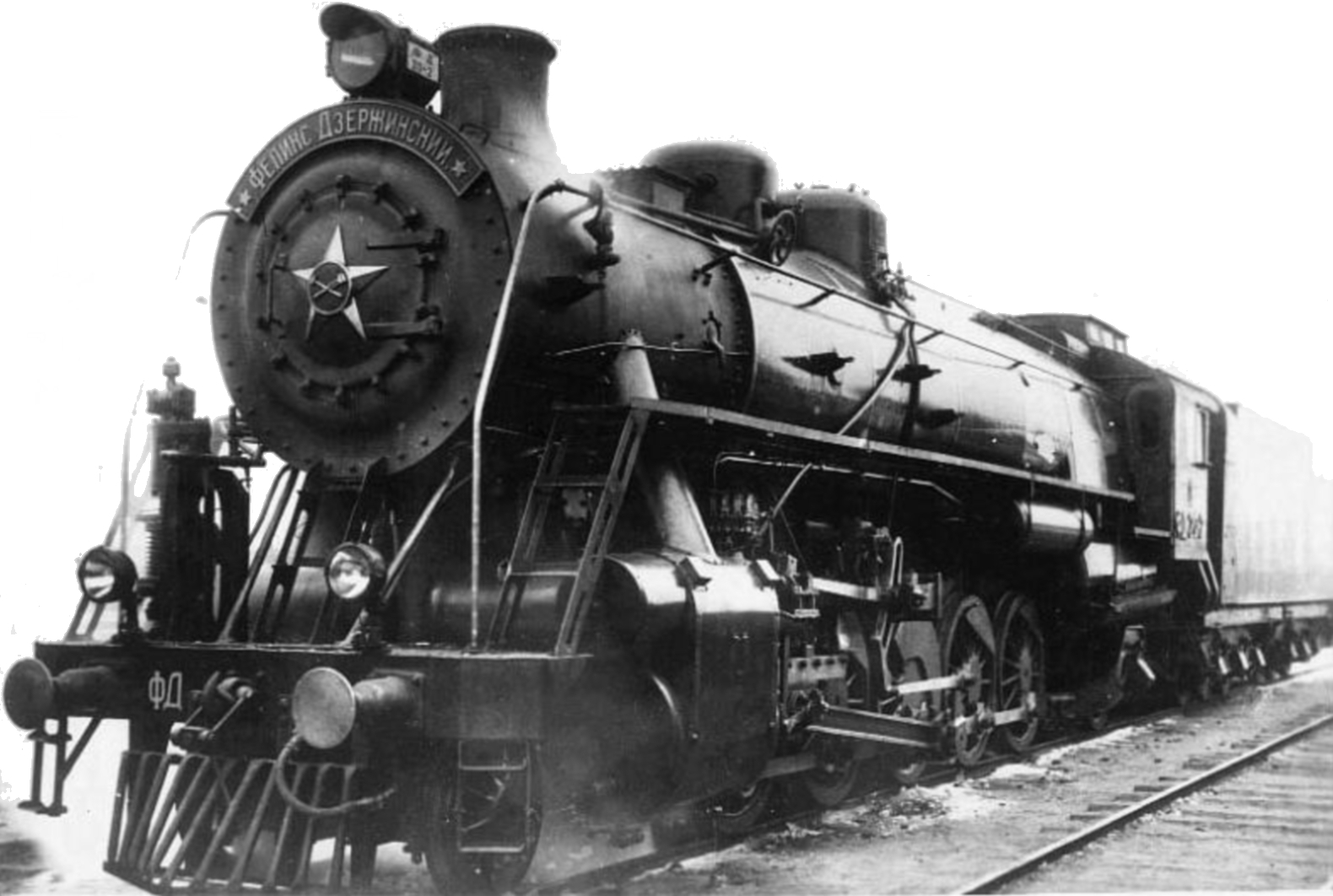
FD20-2

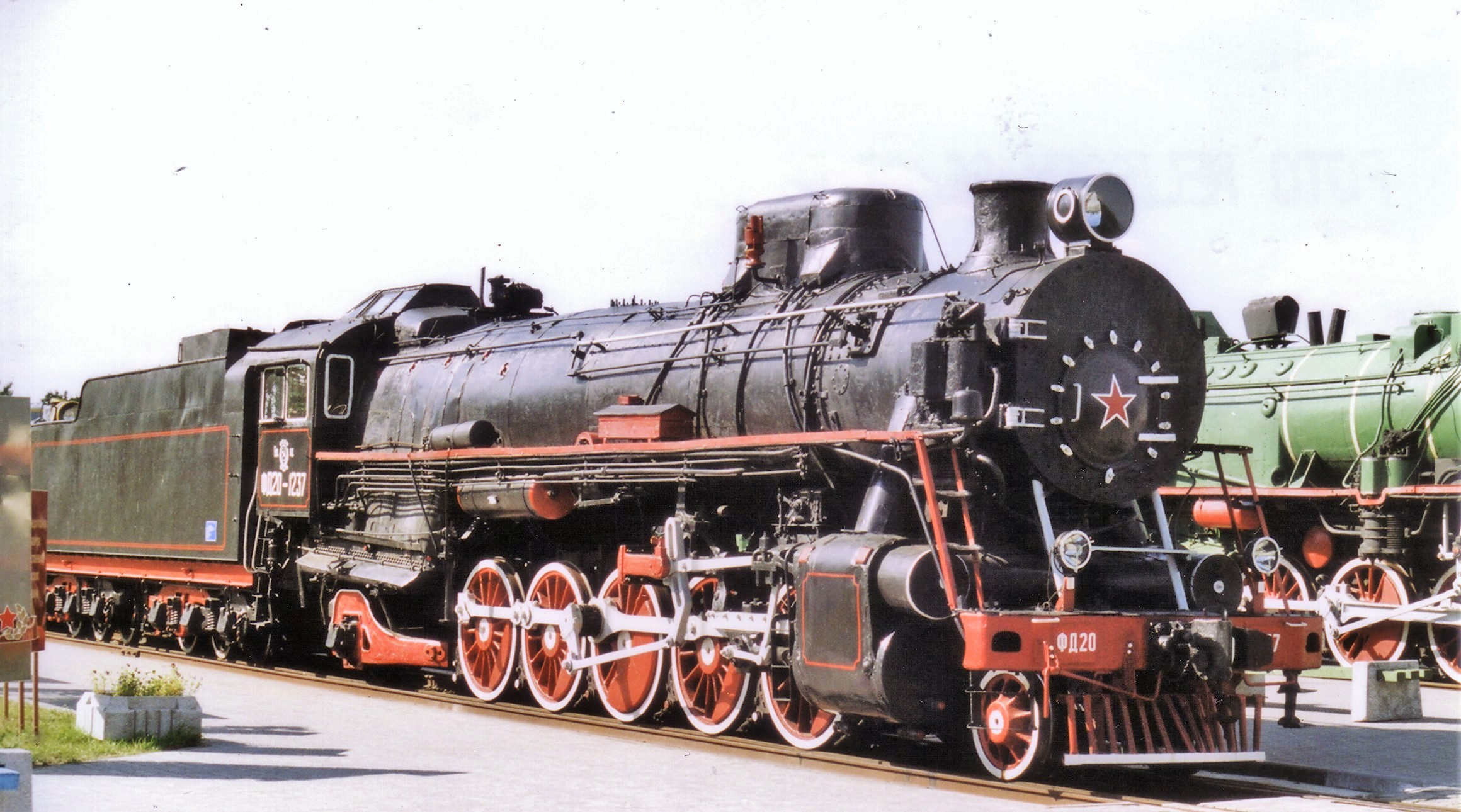
Locomotive FD20-1237 at Brest Railway Museum

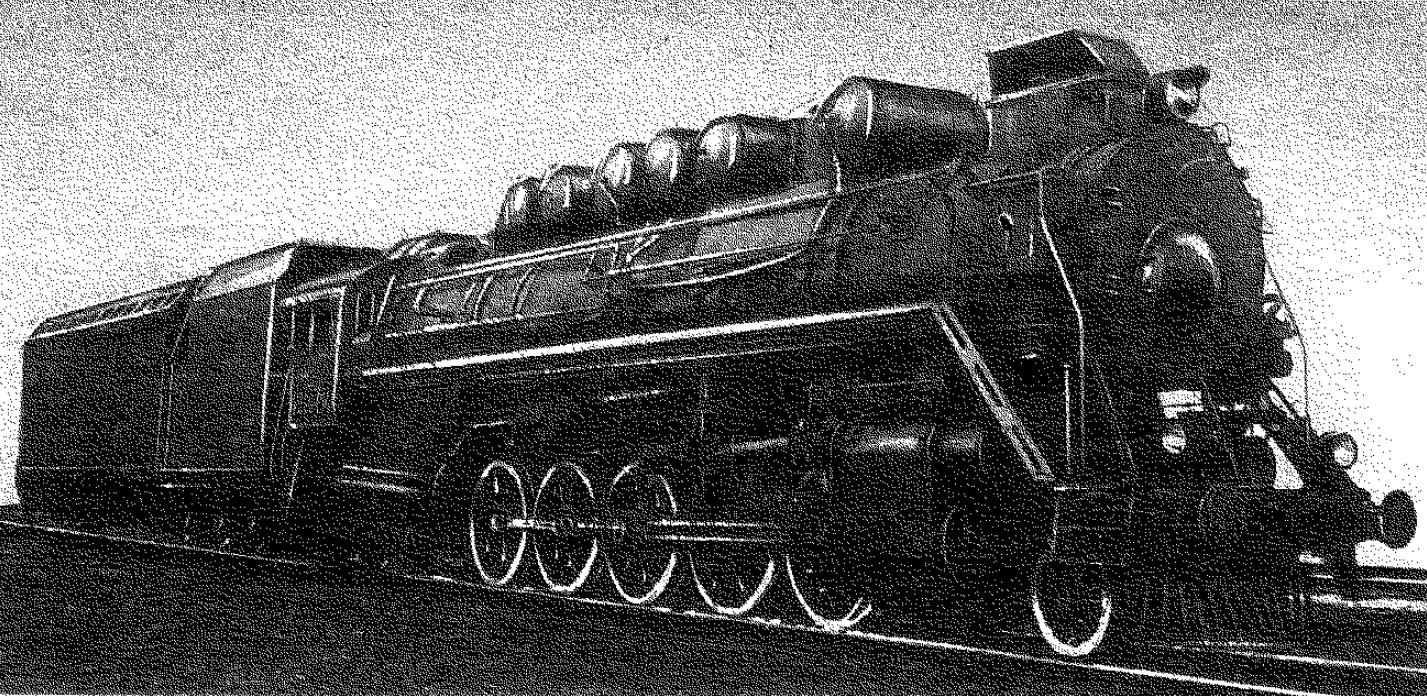
FDk condensing steam locomotive

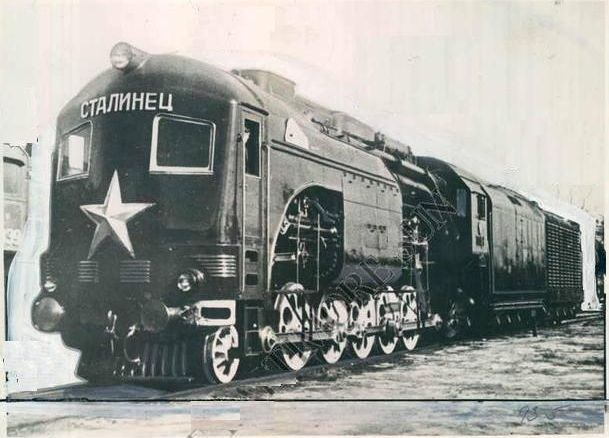
TP1 Steam diesel hybrid locomotive

== See also ==
- Russian Railway Museum, St.Petersburg
- The Museum of the Moscow Railway, at Paveletsky Rail Terminal, Moscow
- Rizhsky Rail Terminal, Home of the Moscow Railway Museum
- Finland Station, St.Petersburg
- History of rail transport in Russia
