= Kuzemkino =

Kuzemkino (Russian: Куземкино) or Kuzyomkino (Кузёмкино) is the name of several inhabited localities in Russia.

Kuzemkino

- Kuzemkino, Ivanovo Oblast, a village in Savinsky District of Ivanovo Oblast
- Kuzemkino, Gryazovetsky District, Vologda Oblast, a village in Vologda Oblast
- Kuzemkino, Totemsky District, Vologda Oblast, a village in Vologda Oblast

Kuzyomkino

- Bolshoye Kuzyomkino, a village in Kingiseppsky District of Leningrad Oblast
