= Sarkyulya =

Sarkyulya Саркюля
- Village
- Location within Leningrad Oblast Location within Russia
- Coordinates: 59°28′58″N 28°04′22″E
- Country: Russia
- Region: Leningrad Oblast
- District: Kingiseppsky District
- Rural settlement: Kuzyomkino Rural Settlement

Population (2019)
  - Total: 1
- Time zone: UTC+3:00

Sarkyulya (Russian: Саркюля) is a village in the Kuzyomkino Rural Settlement of Kingiseppsky District, Leningrad Oblast, Russia. It is located by the river Rosson, a tributary of the Narva River, near the Estonia–Russia border. The village had an estimated population of 1 as of 2019.

== Names and etymology ==
The name of Sarkyulya is of Finnic origin and translates to 'island village'. The area the village is located on is almost completely surrounded by water: by the Rosson, the Narva, the Gulf of Finland and Lake Vaykne (Tikhoye). Older Russian spellings include Sarkyula (Саркюла) and Sarkul (Саркуль). According to Anti Selart, the piece of land has been a true island in the past.

In Estonian, the village is called Saarküla, while in Finnish it is Saarkylä. The usual Izhorian pronunciation is Saarkülä, but Julius Mägiste (1925) also mentions a rare front vowel variant Säärkülä.

== Geography ==
Sarkyulya is located by the river Rosson, near its confluence with the Narva at the border with Estonia. The village of Venekyulya is located on the opposite bank of the Rosson, while the Kurgalsky Zakaznik conservation area is located to the northeast of Sarkyulya. The village is located on a former island, about four kilometers (2.5 mi) long and 1.5 kilometers (0.93 mi) wide; historically, another village named Magerburg also existed on it, closer to the mouth of the Narva. The distance to the municipal center Bolshoye Kuzyomkino is 17 kilometers (11 mi).

== History ==
The site of Sarkyulya may have been settled between the 11th and 12th centuries. The village was first mentioned by name in a Swedish record of Ingria (see Swedish Ingria) from 1582 as Sarakÿla. Between 1618 and 1623, it was mentioned as Narofschoi Ostof by [sic].

In 1684, the town council of Narva allowed the villagers to brew and sell beer, however, they were not allowed to keep taverns.

In 1838, the village of Sarakul had a population of 95, who were state peasants. By 1862, the population had grown to 190, and the village had its own Orthodox chapel and a sawmill.

With the development of nearby Narva-Jõesuu into a resort town, regular boat traffic between it and Sarkyulya began in 1902. Around the same time, seasonal homes began to be built at the banks of the Rosson.

After the Treaty of Tartu of 1920, the eastern bank of the Narva, known as Narvataguse, became part of Estonia. Three municipalities were established in the area, with Saarküla becoming part of the Narva Parish. In March of that year, the village had a population of 181, of whom 167 were Izhorians, 12 were Estonians and two were Finns.

The poet Igor Severyanin lived in Saarküla from 1936 until 1940.

In 1943, Saarküla had a population of 83. The village was largely destroyed in the Battle of Narva of 1944, with most of its inhabitants moving to the western bank of the Narva after the end of World War II. In November 1944, the eastern bank of the Narva was transferred from the Estonian SSR to the Russian SFSR. Since 1978, Sarkyulya has been part of the Kuzyomkino selsoviet, the predecessor of the modern municipality.

== Transport ==
Sarkyulya is accessible via a 12.2-kilometer (7.6 mi) unpaved road from Ropsha. There is no public transport to the village. Plans to establish a ferry connection between Sarkyulya and Venekyulya over the Rosson have been made by the municipal administration.
