= Bolshoye Kuzyomkino =

Bolshoye Kuzyomkino Большое Кузёмкино
- Village
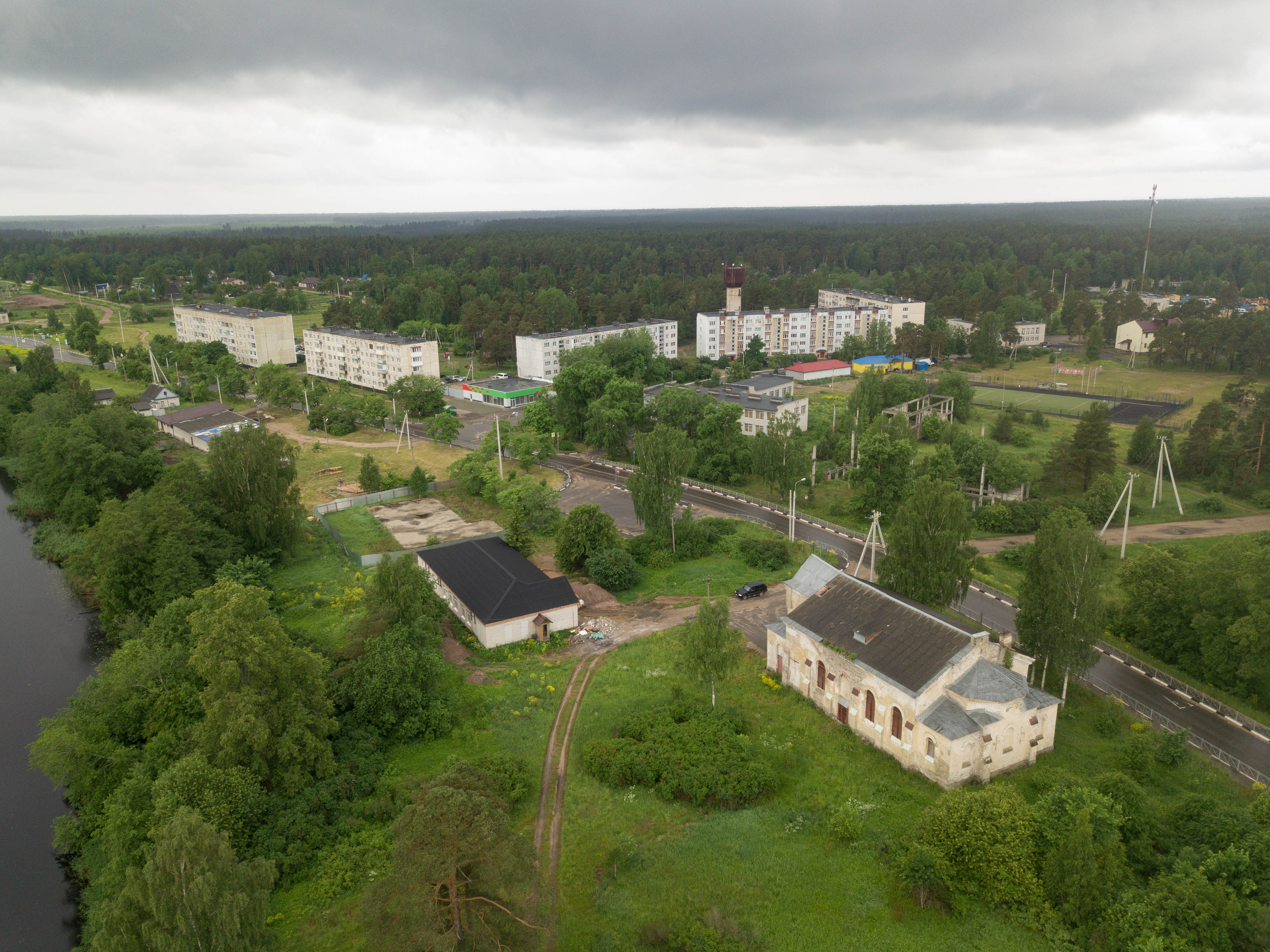

- Location within Leningrad Oblast Location within Russia
- Coordinates: 59°35′05″N 28°11′08″E
- Country: Russia
- Region: Leningrad Oblast
- District: Kingiseppsky District
- Rural settlement: Kuzyomkino Rural Settlement

Population (2019)
  - Total: 963
- Time zone: UTC+3:00

Bolshoye Kuzyomkino (Russian: Большое Кузёмкино) is a village and the administrative center of the Kuzyomkino Rural Settlement in Kingiseppsky District, Leningrad Oblast, Russia. As of 2019, its population was estimated to be 963.

The village has existed at least since the late 16th century and was known simply as Kuzyomkino until 1887, when a fire destroyed it and part of its population established Maloye Kuzyomkino. The inhabitants of Bolshoye Kuzyomkino have historically included ethnic Russians, Izhorians and Finns.

== Etymology ==
The name Kuzyomkino is derived from a given name Kuzemka ~ Kozemka, which appears commonly in nearby Yama in the late 16th century; the village itself may have been established around that time. The Finnish and Izhorian name for the village, Narvusi ~ Narusi, is likely related to that of the Narva River, possibly via a demonym *narvoiset 'people living around the Narva', where its initial settlers may have come from. Votic forms of the name include Narvuzi, Narvusi, Naruzi and Narizi.

Both names are first mentioned in a Swedish record of Ingria compiled between 1582 and 1589: Kusomkyler bÿ (1582), Narues (1584).

== Geography ==
Bolshoye Kuzyomkino is located at the confluence of the Luga and the Mertvitsa. The conservation area of Kurgalsky Zakaznik is located to the west of the village.

The village is the municipal center of the Kuzyomkino Rural Settlement within the Kingiseppsky District. Aside from Bolshoye Kuzyomkino, the municipality includes the villages of Dalnyaya Polyana, Fyodorovka, Gorka, Izvoz, Kallivere, Keykino, Khanike, Korostel, Maloye Kuzyomkino, Novoye Kuzyomkino, Ropsha, Sarkyulya, Strupovo, Udarnik, Vanakyulya, Venekyulya and Volkovo. In 2019, the population of the municipality was estimated to be 1,375, of whom 963 (70%) lived in the village of Bolshoye Kuzyomkino.

== History ==
The original inhabitants of the area around Bolshoye Kuzyomkino were the Izhorians and Votians, who were followed by the Slavs. After the Treaty of Stolbovo in 1617, Ingria became part of Sweden and Lutheran Finnish settlers came to the area soon afterwards. The village of Kuzyomkino became the center of a Lutheran parish in 1640.

In 1797, Emperor Paul I granted land around the lower Luga, including the Itovo manor (near Keykino) and villages such as Kuzyomkino, to Alexander Kurakin as a votchina. Karl Nesselrode bought the manor and villages in 1831, but transferred the possessions to the state in 1848, with the local serfs becoming state peasants. According to Peter von Köppen, the village was populated by 235 Izhorians and 70 Finns (of the Savakko subgroup) in 1848. It is known that Votic people have also historically lived in Kuzyomkino, as Johannes Gezelius the Younger noted their presence after visiting the village in 1684, but they were later assimilated by the Izhorians.

Following the emancipation reform of 1861, the villages of the Itovo votchina and those on the Kurgalsky Peninsula were organized into the Narova volost, with its center in the village of Narovskoye (Venekyulya). In 1862, Kuzyomkino had a population of 392.

After the village burned down in 1887, some of its inhabitants established the nearby village of Maloye Kuzyomkino (lit. 'Little Kuzyomkino'), while the old village came to be known as Bolshoye Kuzyomkino (lit. 'Big Kuzyomkino'). According to a census in 1899, Bolshoye Kuzyomkino had a population of 468, of whom 431 were counted as Finns, 27 as Russians and 10 as mixed (Izhorians were not counted separately). 49 people belonged to the Lutheran church, while the rest were Orthodox. Between 1904 and 1908, after the Stolypin reforms, twenty peasants from Bolshoye Kuzyomkino bought land upstream of the village, establishing Novoye Kuzyomkino.

By the early 20th century, the Narova volost's seat had been moved to Bolshoye Kuzyomkino. After the Treaty of Tartu of 1920, the volost was divided between Estonia and Soviet Russia, with Bolshoye Kuzyomkino remaining on the Russian side. With the establishment of the Leningrad Oblast on 1 August 1927, the volost was reorganized into a selsoviet. During World War II, it was under German occupation from August 1941 until February 1944. During the occupation, many Finns, Izhorians and Votians from the area were relocated to Finland, but had to be returned to the Soviet Union after the war, though most were not allowed to resettle their original homes. The sovkhoz Udarnik-Ropsha was established in 1946 and the area was settled by people from other parts of Russia, such as the Kirov and Ryazan Oblasts. Bolshoye Kuzyomkino grew especially in the 1960s and 1970s, when apartments were built and roads were paved.

== Economy and services ==
The main source of income in the entire municipality is agriculture; as of 2020, there were seven active farms in Bolshoye Kuzyomkino. Most services in the municipality are found in the village, including stores, a post office and a daycare center, among others.

== Churches ==
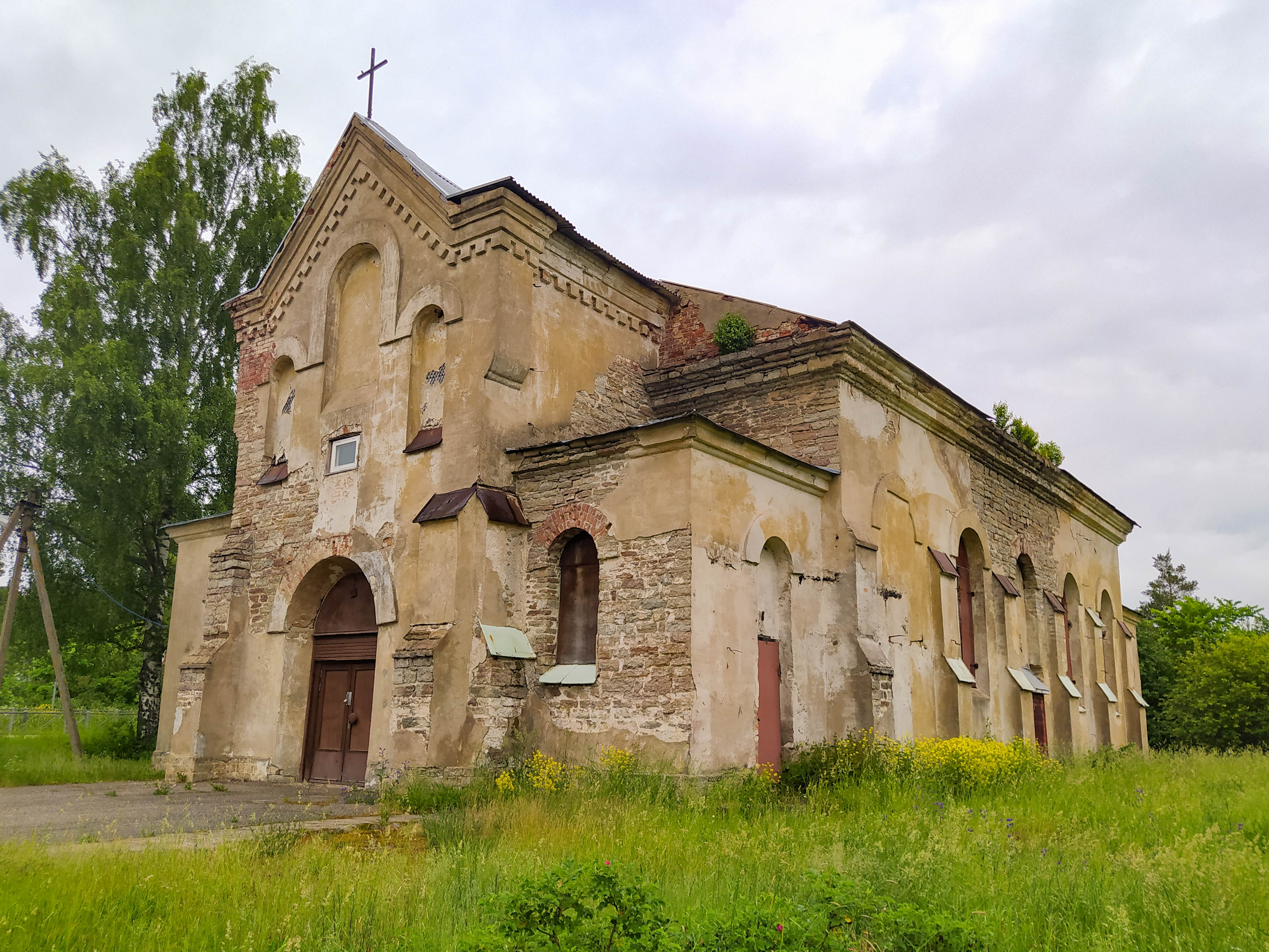
Saint Andrew's Church in 2021

The first Lutheran church in Kuzyomkino was built in 1634 and replaced in 1732. By 1857, the second church had become decrepit and the parish sought permission to build a new one, which was granted in 1876. The currently standing building, a stone church with 450 seats, was designed by Carl Fredric Andersson and finished in 1879. Since the 1870s, the parishioners included not only Finns, but also Estonians, who had settled in the area as tenant farmers. The church was renovated in 1912 and remained in use until 1936, after which it was used as a temporary prison for two years. Church services were held again during German occupation, after which it was closed again and used as a clubhouse. In 1985, the building was recognized as a regionally important cultural object. The Lutheran parish of Kuzyomkino, under the Church of Ingria, was reestablished in 1989 and services were first held in 1997.

There is also а wooden Orthodox church dedicated to Nicholas the Wonderworker in Bolshoye Kuzyomkino, built between 1996 and 2005. No prior Orthodox church is ever known to have existed there, with the closest ones being in nearby villages such as Krakolye.
