= Magerburg =

Former village in Leningrad Oblast, Russia

Magerburg Магербург
- Former village
- Mouth of the Narva in Narva-Jõesuu; Magerburg was located on the opposite shore seen on the right

- Location within Leningrad Oblast Location within Russia
- Coordinates: 59°28′14″N 28°02′46″E
- Country: Russia
- Region: Leningrad Oblast
- District: Kingiseppsky District
- Time zone: UTC+3:00

Magerburg (Russian: Магербург) was a village in Kingiseppsky District, Leningrad Oblast, Russia. It was located at the mouth of the Narva River, opposite to Narva-Jõesuu on the Estonian side.

Magerburg was, together with the still extant Sarkyulya, located on a landmass between the Narva and the Rosson rivers. The site has been inhabited at least since 1570. The place name was first mentioned in 1695 as Mager-Burg and Magerborg. The name comes from the German language and translates to 'thin castle', in contrast to Hungerburg (modern Narva-Jõesuu), 'hunger castle'. The village was the site of a customs point until 1799, when it was relocated to Hungerburg.

During World War I, many German-language place names in Russia were replaced with Russian ones, including that of Magerburg, which was renamed to Nizino (Низино).

After the Treaty of Tartu of 1920, the eastern bank of the Narva, known as Narvataguse, became part of Estonia. At the Estonian census of 1 March 1920, Nizino had a population of 113, comprising 60 Izhorians, 39 Estonians, 13 Russians and one Finn. In June of that year, Magerburg became part of the borough (alev) of Narva-Jõesuu. During Estonian rule, Magerburg was also known by the Estonian names Neemerand and Suudme.

In 1943, the population of Magerburg was 39, including both Estonians and Russians. The village was abandoned after World War II, as it had been destroyed during the 1944 Battle of Narva. The eastern bank of the Narva was transferred from the Estonian SSR to the Leningrad Oblast of the Russian SFSR in 1945.
