= Rosson (river) =

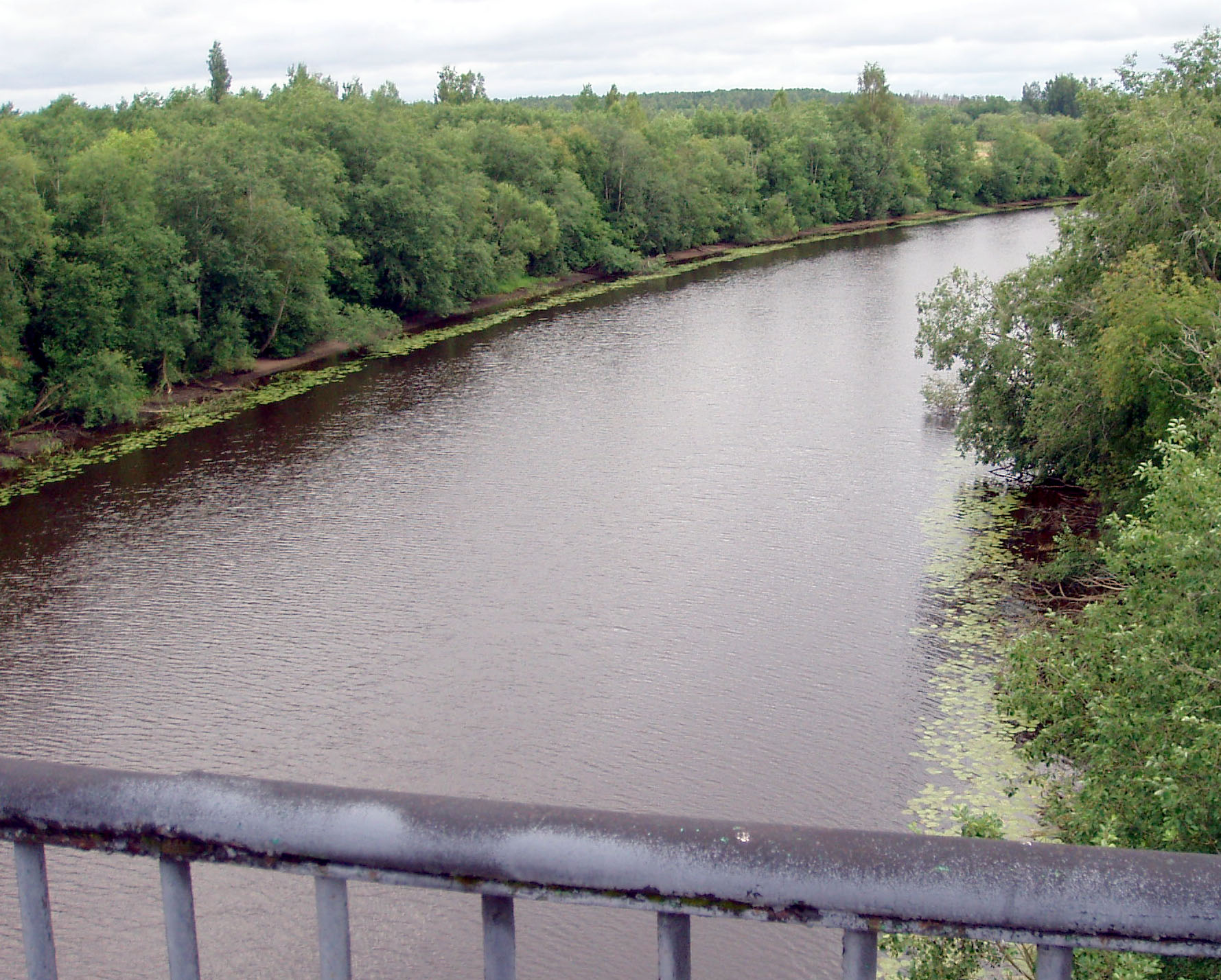
- Rosson in August 2008

Location
- Country: Russia
- Region: Leningrad Oblast
- District: Kingiseppsky District

Physical characteristics
- Source: Luga
  - coordinates: 59.5439°N 28.2456°E
- Mouth: Narva
  - coordinates: 59.4653°N 28.0545°E
- Length: 26 km (16 mi)
- Basin size: 63 km^{2} (24 sq mi)
- Width
  - minimum: 50 m (160 ft)
  - maximum: 120 m (390 ft)

Basin features
- River system: Narva/Luga

The Rosson (Russian: Россонь) (Note: Also called Rossoni (Россони) or Rossoni-yegi (Россони-еги); Estonian: Rossoni jõgi or Rosona jõgi; Finnish: Rosonajoki) is a river in the northwestern part of Kingiseppsky District, Leningrad Oblast, Russia. It has a length of 26 kilometers (16 mi) and flows between the Narva and Luga rivers, which in turn flow into the Gulf of Finland.

== Etymology ==
The name of the Rosson was first mentioned in 1571. Boris Yemelyanov (2011), citing an earlier book on the history of Narva, mentions an etymology connecting the name to the ethnonym Rus', as well as one to an Izhorian word meaning "uneven", referring to the meanders of the river. Yemelyanov also suggests a possible connection to an Izhorian word for "robbery", as the navigable river could have been used as a base for piracy during the time of Hanseatic trade with Novgorod.

== Geography ==
The Rosson has a length of 26 kilometers (16 mi). It connects the Narva and the Luga, both of which discharge into the Gulf of Finland, and may flow in both directions. The distance from the Luga–Rosson confluence to the mouth of the Luga is about 25 kilometers (16 mi), while that from the Narva–Rosson confluence to the mouth of the Narva is 300 meters (980 ft). The villages (listed west to east) of Sarkyulya, Venekyulya, Korostel, Gorka, Kallivere, Vanakyulya and Volkovo are located by the Rosson. Former villages include Arsiya, Magerburg and Mundirovka.

The width of the Rosson ranges between 50 and 120 meters (160 and 390 ft). Near the Luga, the river is about 57 meters (187 ft) wide, 2 meters (6.6 ft) deep and has a muddy bottom. The channel becomes sandy and narrower west of Vanakyulya, but widens to about 80 meters (260 ft) and deepens to 3.5 meters (11 ft) closer to the Narva. The river has multiple anabranches and river islands, as well as steep banks reaching a height of up to 8 meters (26 ft) in some parts. The flow speed of the river is only about 0.05–0.10 m/s (0.16–0.33 ft/s). Its average discharge is 13.2 m^{3}/s (470 cu ft/s).

The river's basin covers an area of 63 square kilometers (24 sq mi). The only significant tributary of the Rosson is Lake Vaykne (also called Tikhoye). The lake is located northwest of Korostel and has an area of about 0.5 square kilometers (0.19 sq mi). About 7 kilometers (4.3 mi) away from the confluence with the Luga, the Mertvitsa branches out from the Rosson, flowing back into the Luga.

== Flow direction ==
Until recently, the flow direction of the Rosson was poorly studied. In a publication from 1972 titled Surface water resources of the USSR (Ресурсы поверхностных вод СССР), the Rosson is described as a distributary of the Luga that flows into the Narva, but changes its direction when the water level at the Narva–Rosson confluence is higher than that at the Luga–Rosson confluence. A study from 2015 suggests instead that the Rosson flows into the Luga for about 320 to 330 days a year, and that the direction changes mainly during spring floods around April, when the Luga–Rosson confluence is some 1.5–2 meters (4.9–6.6 ft) higher than the Narva–Rosson confluence. The results were based on data (surface levels, drop height and stream gradient) collected between 1945 and 1954 from stream gauges at Narva-Jõesuu (Narva) and Bolshoye Kuzyomkino (Luga), as none have existed near the Rosson after 1954. Possible effects of the Narva Reservoir are also not visible in the data, as it was constructed in 1955.

However, according to a study by the State Hydrological Institute published in 2023, the Rosson most commonly flows from the Luga into the Narva. Hourly measurements conducted from November 2012 until September 2020 showed that the water level at the Luga is lower than that at the Narva for only about 19 days a year; this lasted for less than two hours in half of all observed cases, while the longest observed time was 16 hours. Taking the river's length and depth into account, it is unlikely that the flow is able to reverse completely in such a short time. The authors also note that the stream gauge near Bolshoye Kuzyomkino mentioned in the 2015 study was located slightly higher than originally reported.

== History ==
The formation of the Rosson is linked to the retreat of the Littorina Sea from the Narva-Luga lowland, beginning around 7,000 calibrated years BP and intensifying around 5,000 years BP. The modern lowland was occupied by a lagoon, bounded by а ridge stretching from Sininõmme (Note: Sininõmme is a former village in Estonia, now part of Peeterristi.) to Smolka, the Kurovitsy plateau, and a shoal (peresyp) stretching along the Narva Bay, from Meriküla in Estonia to the Kurgalsky plateau. It was connected to the sea by two straits, one to the Narva Bay and the other to the Luga Bay, near modern Bolshoye Kuzyomkino. Around 4,800 BP, the lagoon was reduced into two smaller ones, existing until 4,280 BP, at the modern Leekova and Kader wetlands.

While the mouth of the Luga moved further north, the Narva flowed into the Luga Bay through the lagoons, forming its channel in a strait connecting the two. As the sea level kept dropping, the connection to the Narva Bay was cut off and the Narva became a tributary of the Luga. The lagoons continued to exist as lakes for some time, with the Narva likely flowing into the Luga through Kader, making the Mertvitsa a partial remnant of this channel. During the transition from the Littorina Sea into the Baltic Sea, the level of the sea fluctuated. Around 4,000 BP, higher sea levels caused lateral erosion in the Narva, which in turn eroded through the Meriküla shoal, resulting in the creation of a new, independent mouth. As the sea retreated, the new channel became longer, eventually reaching the northern end of what is now Lake Vaykne. The old channel connected to the Luga became the Rosson.

The mouth of the Narva was located at Vaykne until the 13th century, after which it shifted to its modern location at Narva-Jõesuu. Before the shift, the mouth of the Rosson into the Narva moved 3 kilometers (1.9 mi) downstream near the village of Gorka. The old course (Rivulinna) became overgrown, though water still sometimes flowed into it during high floods of the Luga.

Based on old maps from between the 17th and 19th centuries, the Mertvitsa may have been part of the main channel of the Rosson until the beginning of the 19th century. The modern section of the main channel around Volkovo has a drop of only a few centimeters and appears to have been a secondary channel, with water flowing through it mainly during high-flow periods, causing it to widen over time. The modern arrangement may have been caused by an ice jam on the Luga upstream from Bolshoye Kuzyomkino, flooding the Rosson, while the Mertvitsa was cut off from it by redeposited sand, effectively becoming an oxbow lake. Eventually, the connection between the Rosson and the Mertvitsa was restored.
