= Dmitri Tsvetkov =

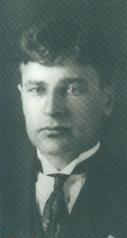
Dmitri Tsvetkov

Dmitri Tsvetkov (Дмитрий Цветков) (30 August 1890 in Krakolye – 1930) was a Votic teacher and linguist. He was the second child of Pavel Grigorevich and Agafia Illarionovna. From 1914 to 1916 he studied at St. Petersburg High School, and after that worked as Russian language teacher in Venkyul. He studied at the University of Tartu and was one of the few Votes to have ever attended and graduated from university. After that he returned to his home village and worked there as a teacher. During this time he also developed grammar for the Votic language and translated Anton Chekhov's children's story Vanka into Votic. He also collected some ethnographic material about Votic customs and traditions. His other works include a Cyrillic alphabet for Votic and a dictionary of the Krakolye dialect. His grammar book was published in 2004, and is currently the only Votic language textbook in use.
