= Venekyulya =

Venekyulya Венекюля
- Village
- Location within Leningrad Oblast Location within Russia
- Coordinates: 59°28′32″N 28°04′52″E
- Country: Russia
- Region: Leningrad Oblast
- District: Kingiseppsky District
- Rural settlement: Kuzyomkino Rural Settlement

Population (2019)
  - Total: 11
- Time zone: UTC+3:00

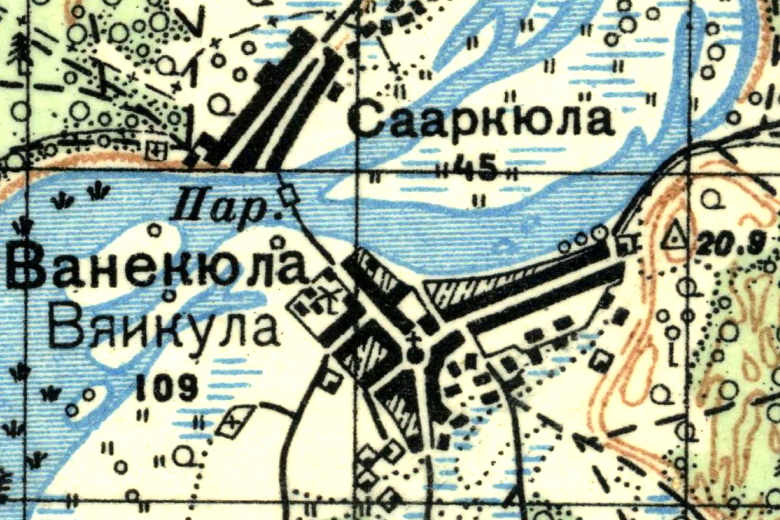
Topographic map of the Leningrad Region, grid square O-35-21-V (Narva), villages of Veneküla (Венекюля) and Sarküla (Саркюля)

Venekyulya (Russian: Венекюля) is a village in the Kuzyomkino Rural Settlement of Kingiseppsky District, Leningrad Oblast, Russia. It is located by the river Rosson, a tributary of the Narva River, near the Estonia–Russia border. As of 2019, its population was estimated to be 11.

== Names ==
Until the 19th century, Venekyulya was often known by names referring to the Narva River, such as (selo) Narovskoye and (derevnya) Narovskaya, though varieties of the modern name also appear, such as Vyankyuli (Вянкюли) in 1732. The name Venkul (Венкуль) became more common afterwards, and was the sole official name from 1944 until 1997, when the current name Venekyulya was adopted. The Estonian name for the village is Väiküla, while the Finnish name is Väikylä. Izhorian forms include Väikülä, Väinkülä, as well as a local form Väükülä.

== Geography ==
Venekyulya is located by the river Rosson, near its confluence (Note: The Rosson flows between the Narva and the Luga, the direction in which it flows depends on water levels.) with the Narva River at the border with Estonia. The village of Sarkyulya is located on the opposite bank of the Rosson. The distance to the municipal center Bolshoye Kuzyomkino is 18 kilometers (11 mi).

== History ==
A Novgorodian port may have existed near modern Venekyulya as early as the 14th century. According to Anti Selart, the "Russian village" (Russchendorp) mentioned in late 14th-century Low German-language sources refers to Venekyulya; in a document written in 1380, the vogt of Narva states that goods transported to Narva from Tallinn should not be unloaded near the "Russian village" (to dem Russchen dorpe). In 1498, a village called russkoye selo Narovskoye (русское село Наровское, lit. 'Russian village on the Narva') is mentioned in a taxation document of the Shelonskaya Pyatina. Boris Yemelyanov (2011) proposes that "Russian" in these names does not refer to the ethnicity of its inhabitants, but to its location on the border between Russian and German (Terra Mariana) territories. The village comprised 62 farms in 1498. It remained a locally important marketplace until the 17th century.

In 1732, Catherine II granted Narovskaya, Sarkyulya and Korostel to a court lady named Darya Tomasovna Greve. In the latter half of the century, Venkul became a possession of Yekaterina Dashkova. By 1838, the villagers had become state peasants and the village had a population of 242.

After the emancipation reform of 1861, the village became the seat of the Narova volost.. In 1862, the village had a population of 276 and its own Orthodox chapel (eukterion). In 1885, Venkul was mentioned as an Izhorian village, whose inhabitants were engaged in loading ships coming to Narva. A zemstvo school existed in the village. By the early 20th century, the seat of the volost was moved to Bolshoye Kuzyomkino.

When a census was conducted in 1899, Venkul had a population of 416, of whom 298 were counted as Finns, 57 as Russians, 7 as Estonians and 54 as mixed (Izhorians were not counted separately). Only ten people belonged to the Lutheran church.

After the Treaty of Tartu of 1920, the eastern bank of the Narva, known as Narvataguse, became part of Estonia. Three municipalities were established in the area, with Venkul (Väiküla) becoming part of the Narva Parish. In March of that year, the village had a population of 563, of whom 561 were Izhorians and two were Estonians. The closure of the Estonian–Russian border affected the local economy, as the villagers could no longer sell fish to the Russian side, causing them to turn mainly to gardening and dairy farming.

In 1943, the population of Väiküla was 263. The local Izhorians were greatly influenced by Russian culture and some of them identified as Russians, but were still distinguished from ethnic Russians by their use of the Izhorian language. While part of Estonia, a primary school with an Estonian- and Russian-language branch existed in the village. German troops burned the village down in 1944.

The eastern bank of the Narva was transferred from the Estonian SSR to the Russian SFSR in November 1944. Within the Russian SFSR, Venkul was initially part of the Narvsky selsoviet until 1954, after which it belonged to the Kurovitsy selsoviet. After the latter was disestablished in 1978, the village became part of the Kuzyomkino selsoviet, the predecessor of the modern municipality.

== Church ==
In 1890, an Orthodox chapel was built in Venkul to replace an older, smaller chapel of about 12 square meters (130 sq ft). The old chapel was moved to Ilkino (Vanakyulya), where it stood until 1950. The villages of Venkul and Sarkul (Sarkyulya) were assigned to the Orthodox parish of Ust-Narva in 1896, where a church had been built in 1893. After Estonian independence, the chapel was expanded into a church in 1922 and a parish under the eparchy of Tallinn was established in 1926. The church was closed in 1938 and burned by German troops in 1944.
