= Kingiseppsky =

Kingiseppsky (masculine), Kingiseppskaya (feminine), or Kingiseppskoye (neuter) may refer to:

- Kingiseppsky District, a district of Leningrad Oblast, Russia
- Kingiseppskoye Urban Settlement, a municipal formation corresponding to Kingiseppskoye Settlement Municipal Formation, an administrative division of Kingiseppsky District of Leningrad Oblast, Russia
- Kingiseppsky (rural locality), a rural locality (a logging depot settlement) in Leningrad Oblast, Russia

== See also ==
- Kingissepa, name of Kuressaare, a town in Estonia, in 1952–1988
