= Luzhitsy =

Luzhitsy (Russian: Лужицы) is the name of several rural localities in Russia.

- Luzhitsy, Kingiseppsky District, Leningrad Oblast, a village in Ust-Luzhskoye Settlement Municipal Formation of Kingiseppsky District in Leningrad Oblast
- Luzhitsy, Slantsevsky District, Leningrad Oblast, a village in Novoselskoye Settlement Municipal Formation of Slantsevsky District in Leningrad Oblast
- Luzhitsy, Pskov Oblast, a village in Opochetsky District of Pskov Oblast
