= Lake Vaykne =

Lake in Leningrad Oblast, Russia

- Interactive map of Lake Vaykne
- Location: Kingiseppsky District, Leningrad Oblast
- Coordinates: 59.506°N 28.087°E
- Primary outflows: outlet into the Rosson
- Surface area: 0.5 km^{2} (0.19 sq mi)

Lake Vaykne (Russian: Вайкне) (Note: Аlso called Vyaykne (Вяйкне) and Tikhoye ozero (Тихое озеро); Estonian: Vaikne järv, lit. 'quiet/still lake') is a 0.5-square-kilometer (0.19 sq mi) lake in Kingiseppsky District, Leningrad Oblast, Russia. Its waters flow into the Rosson, a river connecting the Narva and the Luga.

The lake is a remnant of the old mouth of the Narva, flowing into the Baltic Sea at this location until the 13th century.

== Geography ==
Lake Vaykne covers an area of 0.5 square kilometers (0.19 sq mi) and flows into the river Rosson about 2 kilometers (1.2 mi) northwest of the village of Korostel. The Rosson in turn connects the Narva and the Luga and may potentially flow in either direction; the river has a flow speed of only 0.05–0.10 m/s (0.16–0.33 ft/s). Roads to Korostel and Sarkyulya run near the lake's northern, eastern and western shores.

== Environmental values ==
Lake Vaykne is located at the southern end of the Kurgalsky Zakaznik conservation area. Around 250 different species of bird have been observed within the entire area, however, its southern section is poorly studied in comparison to other parts. In a study of birds in the conservation area done between 2007 and 2008 (58 total days), woodlarks and one pair of white-tailed eagles were observed at the lake. In a newer study published in 2016, two stock doves, one corn crake and one common kingfisher were observed. The corn crake and stock dove are protected species in the oblast.

The lake is a spawning ground for zander from the Baltic Sea, which migrate into the lake via the Narva and the Rosson.

== History ==
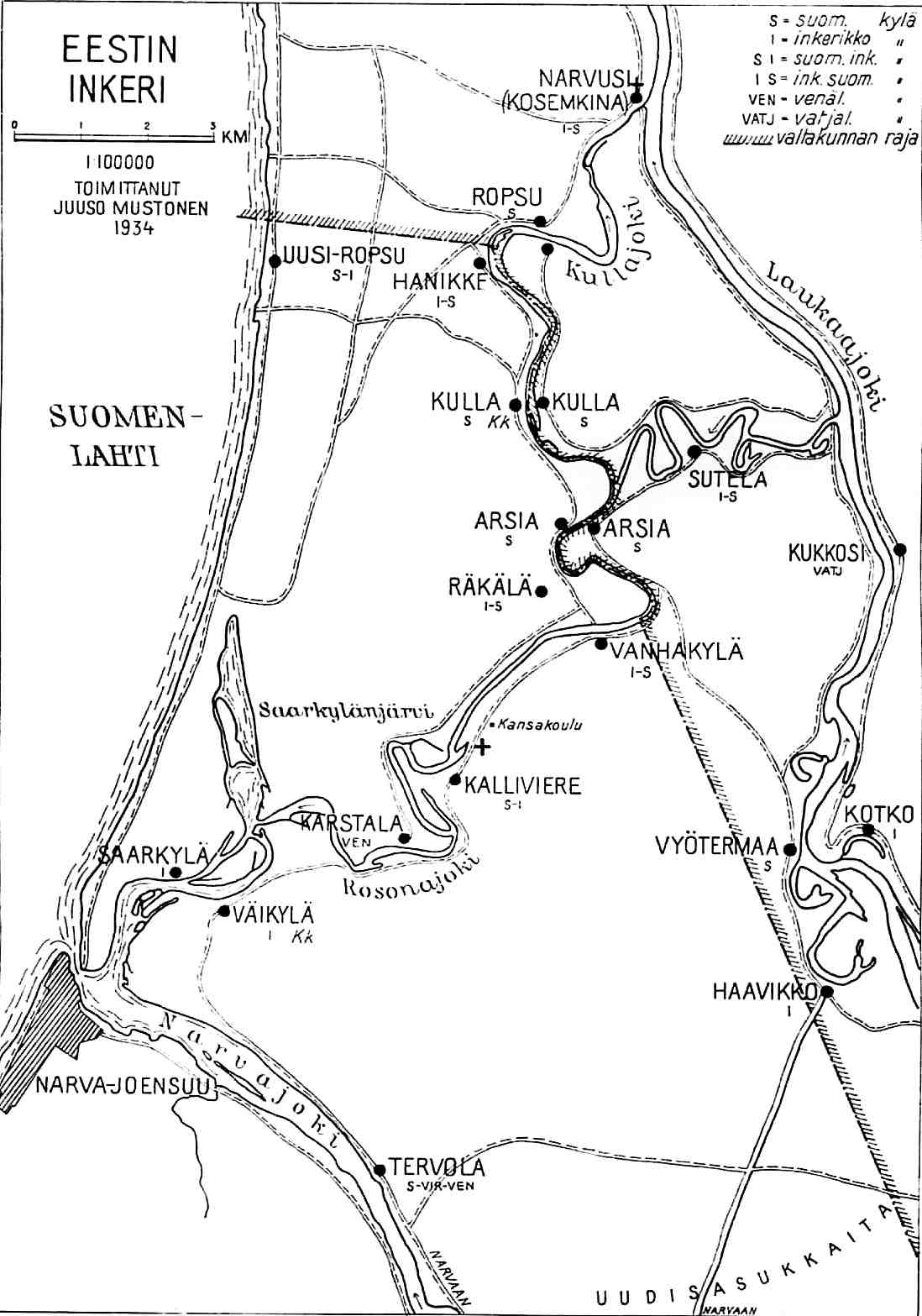
Finnish-language map of Estonian Ingria and surroundings from 1934, showing the lake as Saarkylänjärvi.

After the Littorina Sea had begun retreating from the Narva-Luga lowland around 7,000 years BP, the Narva and the Luga began forming their channels below (north) of the Baltic Klint. Both flowed independently into a lagoon of the sea until it drained about 4,280 years BP, after which the Narva became a tributary of the Luga. After 4,000 BP, the Narva eroded a new outlet through a shoal that had separated the lagoon from the rest of the sea, expanding over time and becoming the river's new mouth. This new section became longer as the sea level dropped again, eventually reaching the northern end of what is now Lake Vaykne. The Rosson is a remnant of the older channel of the Narva connected to the Luga.

The mouth of the Narva was located at the site of the lake until the 13th century, when it shifted 6 kilometers (3.7 mi) southwest to its modern location at Narva-Jõesuu. The modern mouth may have originated as a canal, dug to shorten the travel time between the developing town of Narva and the sea, or formed naturally due to subsidence of a section of the former shoal, as the area appears to be located above a pre-glacial river valley.

The mouth of the Rosson had also shifted, sometime before that of the Narva did, 3 kilometers (1.9 mi) downstream near the village of Gorka. Eventually, the old mouth of the Narva was cut off from the river system, as redeposited alluvium carried by the Rosson accumulated at its southern end. The mouth area initially became a narrow bay of the Baltic Sea, later turning into a lake due to post-glacial rebound. Lake Vaykne continued to flow into the Narva Bay via a small stream until the 19th century, when the lake was reconnected to the Rosson via a loop in the river.
