= Keykino =

Coordinates: 59.465837°N 28.250731°E

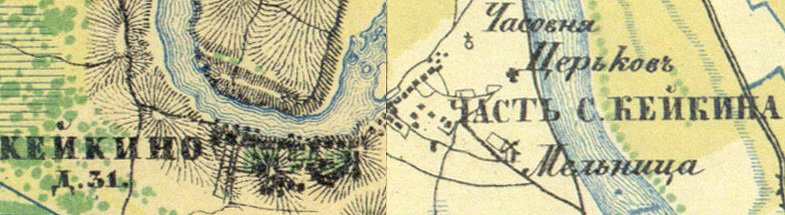
Keykino on a 1860 map

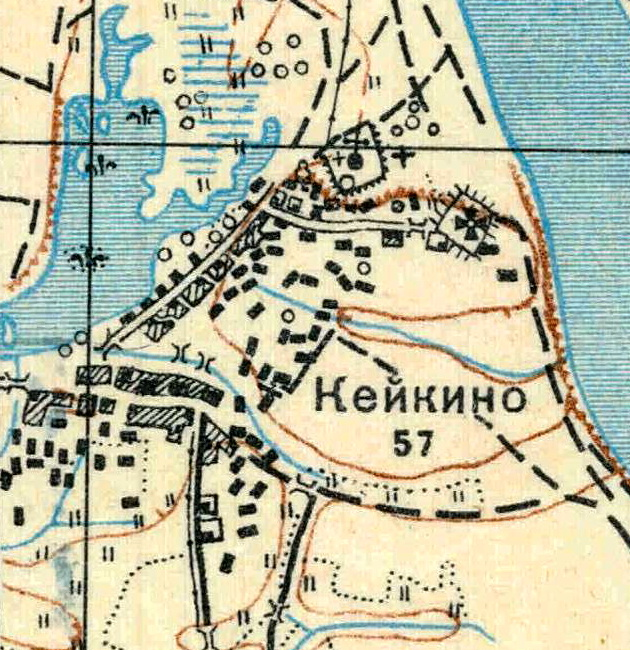
keykino on a 1930 map

Keykino (Russian: Кейкино) is a village in Kingisepp District, Leningrad Oblast, Russia. Its distance to the administrative center (Kingisepp) is 15km. It is located on an oxbow by the left bank of Luga River.

In 2007 the population was 98. In 2017 its population was 88.

== History ==
The settlement is within the historical region of Ingria. It was mentioned in 1671 in a Scribe Book (land inventory) of the area under the name Кикино (Кекино). Later it was variously known as: "Apakÿle 1582: Apakÿlla 1584 (4), Happekÿlla 1585 (2), Happekÿlla 1586(2), Hapekÿlla 1589 (6);6 Кикино (Кекино) 1571 (Андр. 453), Keikina by 1618—1623 (Андр. 455), Keikina 1667 (Faber), Kiakina 1699 (Carta), Kiakinaby 1704 (Andersin), Киакiна 1704 (Шхон.), Пеипинъ 1727 (Кир.), Кекино 1770 (Шмит), Kiäkina 1827 (Берг.), Кейкино 1834 (Шуб.), Haawikko 1849 (Koeppen), Кейкино 1863 (ТК-3), Кейкино 1906 (Стрельб.), Haavikko 1929 (Must.), Кейкино 1942 (ТККА), Haavikko 1970 (NSS), Haavikko/Кейкино/Haaviku 1992 (ITK)". Its current Finnish name is Haavikko.
