= Slantsevsky =

Slantsevsky (masculine), Slantsevskaya (feminine), or Slantsevskoye (neuter) may refer to:

- Slantsevsky District, a district of Leningrad Oblast, Russia
- Slantsevskoye Urban Settlement, a municipal formation corresponding to Slantsevskoye Settlement Municipal Formation, an administrative division of Slantsevsky District of Leningrad Oblast, Russia
