= Krakolye =

Krakolye Краколье Jõgõperä (Votic)
- Village (abolished)
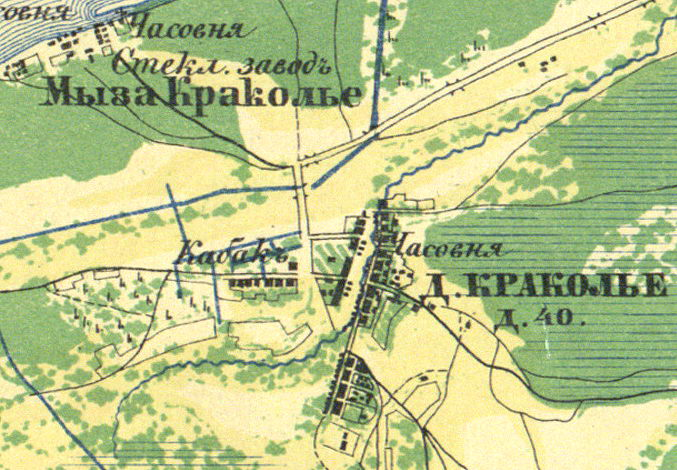
- Map. 1860 year
- Interactive map of Krakolye
- Location of Krakolye Krakolye (Leningrad Oblast)
- Coordinates: 59°39′N 28°17′E
- Country: Russia
- Federal subject: Leningrad Oblast
- Administrative district: Kingiseppsky District
- Selsoviet: Ust-Luzhsky Selsoviet
- First mentioned: 1654
- Abolished: October 24, 2008
- Elevation: 13 m (43 ft)

Population
  - Estimate (2007): 110 )

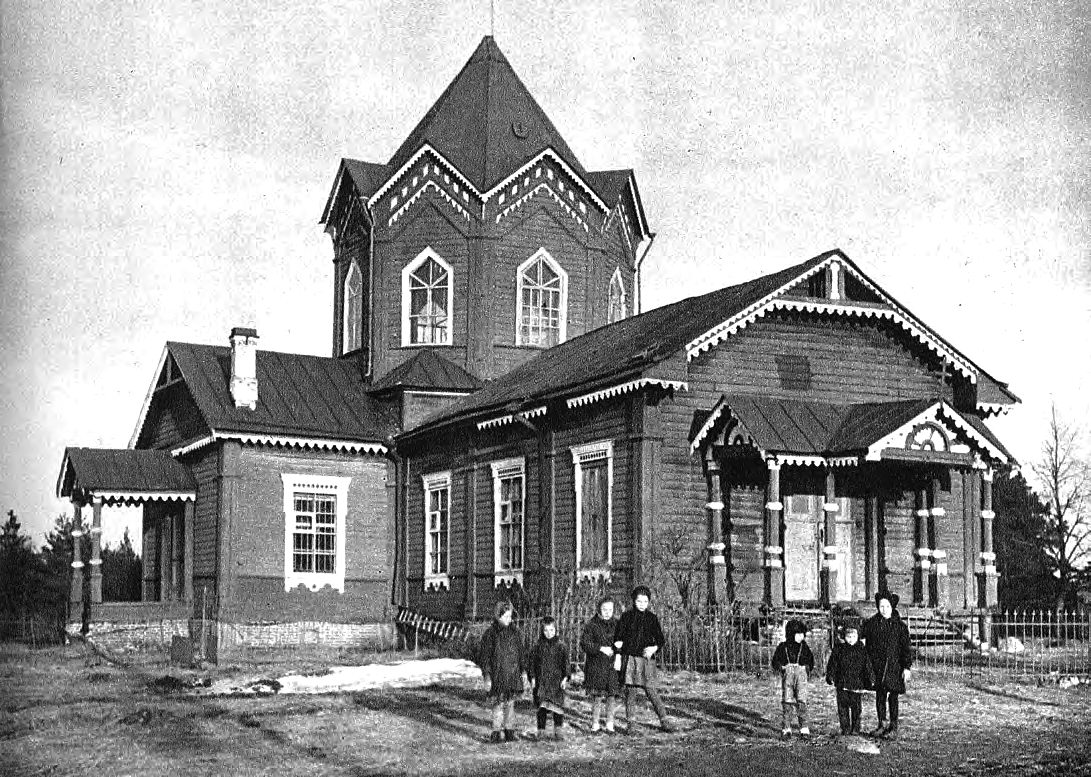
A church in Krakolye in 1943

Krakolye (Russian: Кракóлье; Votic: Jõgõperä; Finnish: Joenperä; Ingrian: Joenperä) was a rural locality (a village) in Ust-Luzhsky Selsoviet of Kingiseppsky District in Leningrad Oblast, Russia, located just south of Ust-Luga and about 8 kilometers (5.0 mi) southwest of the Ust-Luga Harbour. It is now a part of the settlement of Ust-Luga. Population: 110 (2007 est.).

== History ==
Krakolye was first mentioned in Joan Blaeu's Livonian Atlas in 1654 as Kargalse. It was one of the two villages where the Votic language was still spoken; the other was Luzhitsy in the Leningrad Oblast.

The village was merged into Ust-Luga effective October 24, 2008.

== Notable people ==
Votic teacher and linguist Dmitri Tsvetkov (1890–1930) was born in Krakolye.
