= Viktor Kingissepp =

Estonian politician (1888–1922)

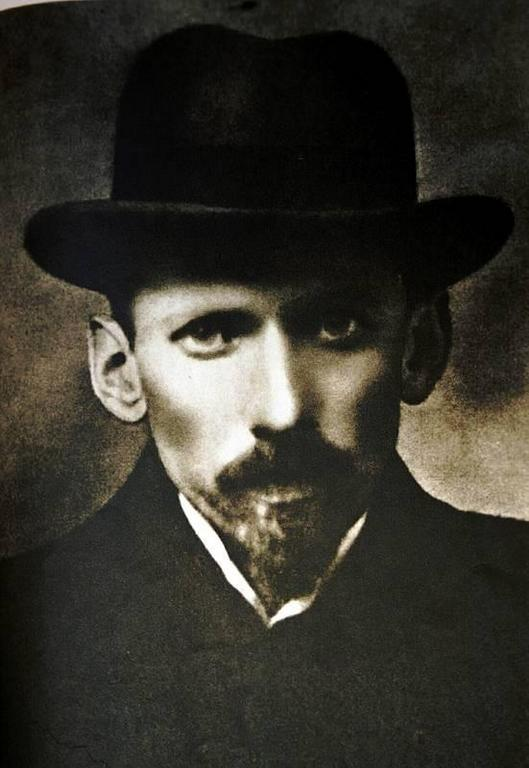
- Born: March 24, 1888; Marientali, Kuressaare, Estonia
- Died: May 4, 1922 (aged 34); Tallinn, Estonia
- Occupation: Communist politician

Viktor Eduard Kingissepp (Russian: Виктор Эдуардович Кингисепп; 24 March [O.S. 12 March] 1888 – 4 May 1922) was an Estonian communist politician who was a founder and leading member of the Estonian Communist Party.

Kingissepp was born at the former manor in Marientali, now part of Kuressaare. The son of a factory worker, he joined a Marxist circle as a schoolboy in Arensburg (now Kuressaare) (which was renamed Kingissepp in 1952, but was restored to its original Estonian name in 1988), and organised the Estonian section of the Russian Social Democratic Labour Party, in St Petersburg. During the war with Germany, he was put in charge of a medical train on the Western Front. After the February revolution, he returned to Petrograd (as St Petersburg was now named), and joined the Bolsheviks and the Red Guards. After the Bolshevik Revolution, he was deputy chairman of the Estonian Revolutionary Soviet in Reval (now Tallinn), but fled back to Petrograd after Estonia was occupied by the German army. He joined the Cheka, and in August 1918 carried out the arrest of Fanny Kaplan, who had shot and attempted to kill Lenin. He returned to Estonia in November 1918 to organise the banned Estonian Communist Party, and presided over its first congress in November 1920. He was arrested by the Estonian Political Police on 3 May 1922, after a mass May Day demonstration in Tallinn, and executed that same night.

== Legacy ==
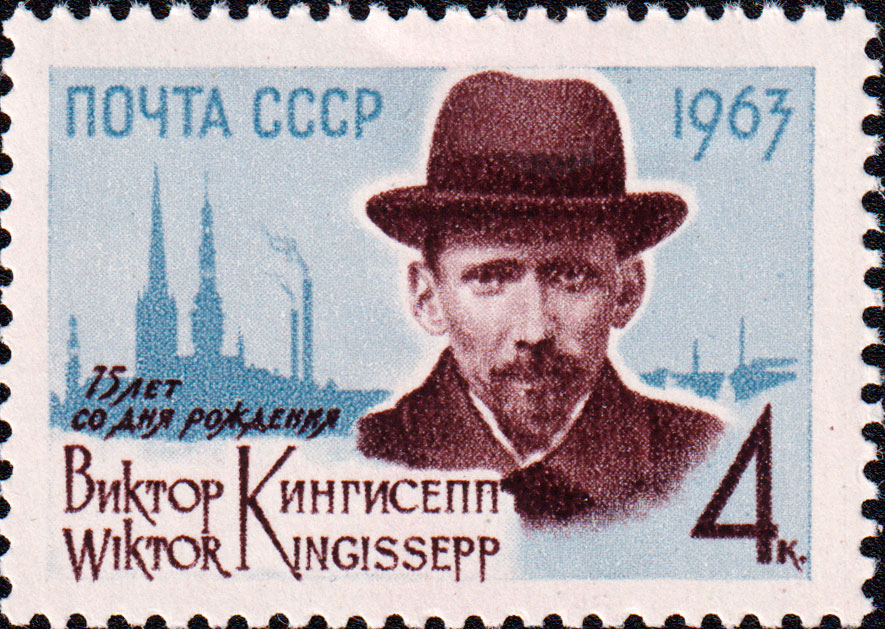
Soviet commemorative stamp featuring Viktor Kingisepp for his 75th birthday, 1963

The Soviet Russian government renamed the town of Yamburg Kingisepp in his honour. The Estonian town of Kuressaare on Saaremaa island was also renamed Kingissepa to honour him. The Estonian Drama Theatre in Tallinn was named Viktor Kingisepp Tallinn National Drama Theatre to honour him. Many Estonian towns had their own Viktor Kingissepa tänav 'Viktor Kingissepp Street' during the Soviet era.
