= Kuzemkino, Ivanovo Oblast =

Kuzemkino Куземкино
- Village
- Location within Ivanovo Oblast Location within Russia
- Coordinates: 56°35′N 41°00′E
- Country: Russia
- Region: Ivanovo Oblast
- District: Savinsky District
- Time zone: UTC+3:00

Kuzemkino (Russian: Куземкино) is a rural locality (a village) in Savinsky District, Ivanovo Oblast, Russia. Population: 24 (2010 census);

== Geography ==
This rural locality is located 12 kilometres (7.5 mi) from Savino (the district's administrative centre), 44 kilometres (27 mi) from Ivanovo (capital of Ivanovo Oblast) and 228 kilometres (142 mi) from Moscow. Voznesenye is the nearest rural locality.
