= Narvataguse =

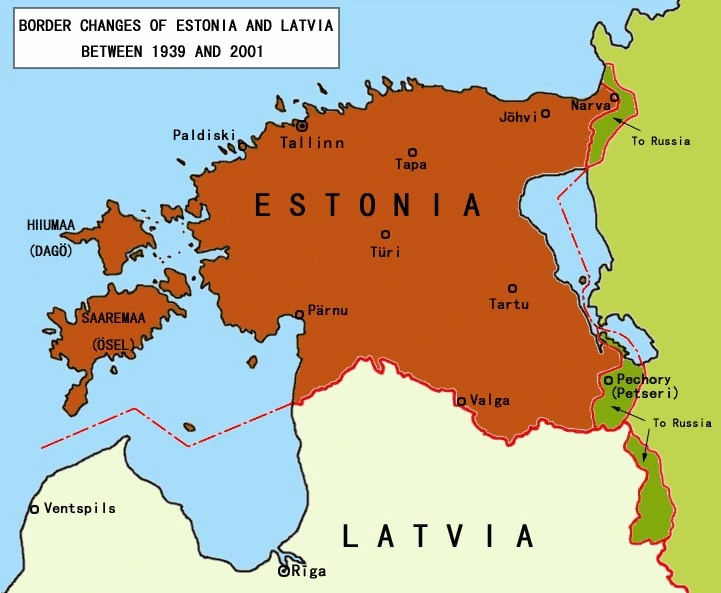
Territorial changes of Estonia and Latvia between 1939 and 2001. Narvataguse is the territory near the city of Narva.

Narvataguse (also known as Narva-tagune; Russian: Занаровье, romanized: Zanarovye) is a term referring to the territory east of the Narva River that was part of Estonia between 1920 and 1944/1945, after which it has belonged to the Leningrad Oblast, first under the Russian SFSR of the Soviet Union and later Russia.

The eastern bank of the Narva River was ceded by Soviet Russia to Estonia under the 1920 Treaty of Tartu. Under Estonian rule, the area was divided into three parishes: Narva, Kose and Skarjatina, which had a combined population of 7,608 in 1922. It also included Ivangorod, which was a district of Narva while being part of Estonia.

Like in Petseri County, village lands in Narvataguse were initially owned communally (see obshchina), despite privatization beginning in the late Tsarist period with the Stolypin reforms. The implementation of a reform to privatize land in the area began in 1923 and was properly carried out after a land reform act was passed by the Riigikogu in 1926.

In 1934, the three parishes of Narvataguse had a combined population of 7,645. The majority of the population at around 77% (5,874 people) were ethnic Russians, with Estonians being a minority at 12%. The remaining 11% belonged to other ethnic groups, namely Ingrian Finns and Izhorians, mostly living in the Narva parish in an area known as Estonian Ingria. A small Votic community also existed, with 14 members counted in the parish in 1935. In 1939, the Kose and Skarjatina parishes were renamed to Piiri and Raja, respectively.

The eastern bank of the Narva River was transferred from the Estonian SSR to the Russian SFSR by decree of the Presidium of the Supreme Soviet of the Soviet Union in November 1944. The Presidium of the Supreme Soviet of the Estonian SSR accepted the transfer of Narvataguse as well as most of Petseri County on 18 January 1945. Nowadays, the area is part of the Kingiseppsky and Slantsevsky Districts of Leningrad Oblast.

== See also ==
- Territorial changes of the Baltic states
