= Slantsevsky District =

Slantsevsky District Сланцевский район (Russian)
- District
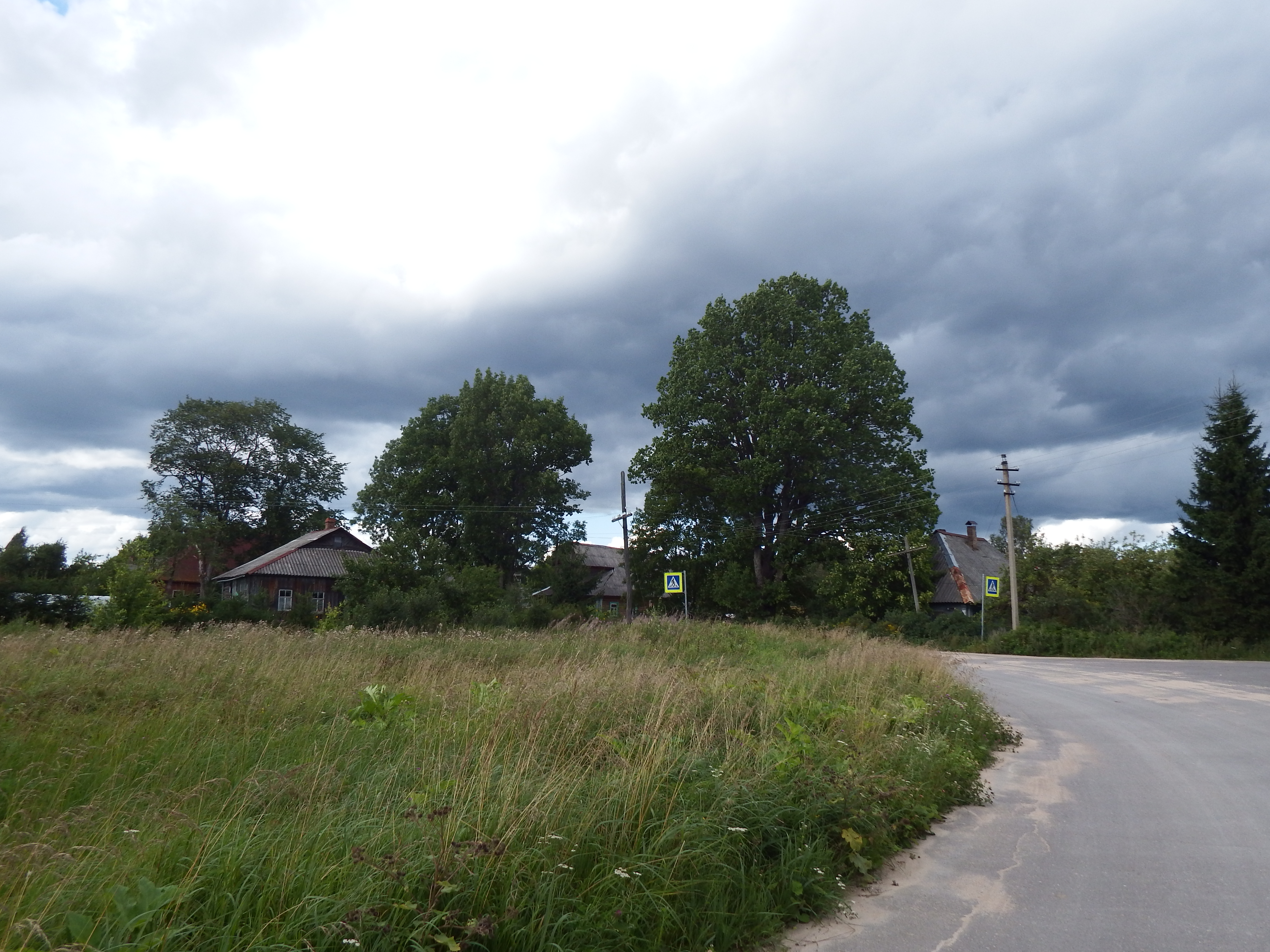

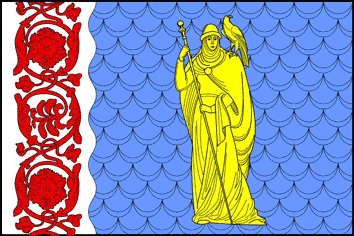
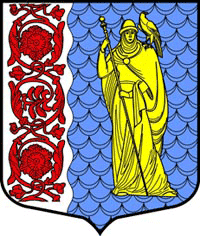
- Flag Coat of arms
- Location of Slantsevsky District in Leningrad Oblast
- Coordinates: 59°07′N 28°05′E
- Country: Russia
- Federal subject: Leningrad Oblast
- Established: 1949
- Administrative center: Slantsy

Area
  - Total: 2,191.1 km^{2} (846.0 sq mi)

Population (2010 Census)
  - Total: 10,038
  - Density: 4.5813/km^{2} (11.865/sq mi)
  - Urban: 0%
  - Rural: 100%

Administrative structure
  - Administrative divisions: 6 settlement municipal formation
  - Inhabited localities: 1 cities/towns, 155 rural localities

Municipal structure
  - Municipally incorporated as: Slantsevsky Municipal District
  - Municipal divisions: 1 urban settlements, 6 rural settlements
- Time zone: UTC+3 (MSK)
- OKTMO ID: 41642000
- Website: http://www.slanmo.ru

Slantsevsky District (Russian: Сла́нцевский райо́н) is an administrative and municipal district (raion), one of the seventeen in Leningrad Oblast, Russia. It is located in the southwest of the oblast and borders with Ida-Viru County of Estonia in the west, Kingiseppsky District in the north, Volosovsky District in the northeast, Luzhsky District in the east, Plyussky District of Pskov Oblast in the south, and Gdovsky District, also of Pskov Oblast, in the southwest. The area of the district is 2,191.1 square kilometers (846.0 sq mi). Its administrative center is the town of Slantsy. Population (excluding the administrative center): 10,038 (2010 census); 10,480 (2002 Census); 10,974 (1989 Soviet census).

== Geography ==
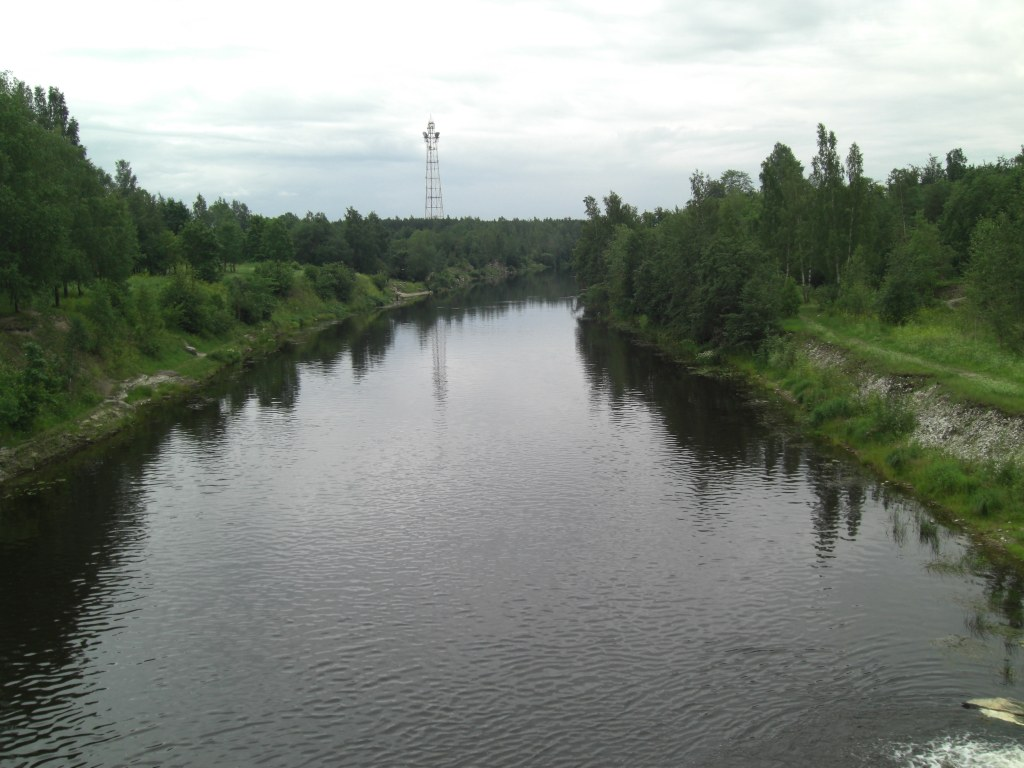
The Plyussa River in the town of Slantsy

The area of the district is flat. Its western and southern parts belong to the drainage basin of the Narva River. The Narva flows at the border between Russia and Estonia, and in the northwestern part of the district is dammed and forms the Narva Reservoir. The largest tributary of the Narva within the district is the Plyussa. The eastern part of the district belongs to the basin of the Luga River, with the largest tributary of the Luga within the district being the Dolgaya River. The Luga itself forms the northeastern border of the district.

== History ==
Originally, the area of the district was populated by Finnic peoples, eventually, the Slavs began arriving. After the 9th century, the eastern part of the area was dependent on the Novgorod Republic (from the 15th century, the Grand Duchy of Moscow), and the western part belonged to Pskov. The area was constantly at the frontier and became the battleground between Germans and Swedes, on one side, and Russians, on the other side. It was desolated during the Livonian War. In 1617, according to the Treaty of Stolbovo, the west of the area was transferred to Sweden, and in the 1700s, during the Great Northern War, it was conquered back by Russia.

In the course of the administrative reform carried out in 1708 by Peter the Great, the area was included into Ingermanland Governorate (known since 1710 as Saint Petersburg Governorate). Later on, Gdovsky Uyezd with the administrative center in Gdov was established, and the area was a part of Gdovsky Uyezd. The governorate was renamed Petrograd in 1914 and Leningrad in 1924. In 1919, Gdovsky Uyezd was an area where important events of the Russian Civil War and the Estonian War of Independence were taking place. Originally, the area east of the Narva was under control of the revolutionary government. On May 15, 1919, the detachment under command of Stanislav Bulak-Balakhovich captured Gdov, and the whole uyezd thus came under control of the Yudenich's White Army troops. In November 1919, the Red Army recaptured Gdov.

On August 1, 1927, the uyezds were abolished, and Gdovsky District was established, with the administrative center in the town of Gdov. It included parts of former Gdovsky Uyezd. The governorates were abolished as well, and the district became a part of Luga Okrug of Leningrad Oblast. On July 23, 1930, the okrugs were abolished as well, and the districts were directly subordinated to the oblast. Between March 22, 1935 and September 19, 1940, Gdovsky District was a part of Pskov Okrug of Leningrad Oblast, one of the okrugs abutting the state boundaries of the Soviet Union.

On March 11, 1941, Slantsevsky District, with the administrative center in the urban-type settlement of Slantsy, was split from Gdovsky District. One selsoviet from Kingiseppsky District was transferred to newly established Slantsevsky District. Between August 1941, and February 1944, Slantsevsky District was occupied by German troops. In February 1944, the Kingisepp–Gdov Offensive, a military operation in which the Soviet Army advanced to the east bank of the Narva and of Lake Peipus, took place here.

The areas adjacent to the Narva River were assigned to Estonia in 1920, following the Estonian War of Independence and the Treaty of Tartu, signed on February 2, 1920. On November 24, 1944 this area was transferred to Leningrad Oblast and shared between Slantsevsky (south) and Kingiseppsky (north) Districts.

On April 5, 1949 Slantsy was granted town status. On January 1, 1963 Slantsevsky District was abolished and split between Kingiseppsky and Luzhsky Districts. On November 3, 1965 it was re-established and included some of the areas previously transferred to Kingiseppsky District.

On August 1, 1927 Osminsky District with the administrative center in the selo of Osmino was established as well. It was a part of Luga Okrug of Leningrad Oblast. It included areas which were previously parts of Gdovsky, Luzhsky, and Kingiseppsky Uyezds. On July 23, 1930, the okrugs were abolished, and the districts were directly subordinated to the oblast. Between March 22, 1935 and September 19, 1940, Osminsky District was a part of Kingisepp Okrug of Leningrad Oblast, one of the okrugs abutting the state boundaries of the Soviet Union. Between August 1941, and February 1944, Osminsky District was occupied by German troops. On August 2, 1961 Osminsky District was abolished and split between Slantsevsky and Volosovsky Districts. After the abortive administrative reform of the 1960s, its territory became split between Slantsevsky, Volosovsky, Luzhsky, and Kingiseppsky Districts.

Another district established on August 1, 1927 was Rudnensky District, with the administrative center in the selo of Rudno. It included parts of former Gdovsky Uyezd. The district was a part of Luga Okrug of Leningrad Oblast. On August 30, 1930, the administrative center of the district was transferred to the village of Vyskatka. On August 10, 1933, Rudnensky District was abolished and split between Gdovsky and Osminsky Districts. Its area is currently split between Gdovsky and Slantsevsky Districts.

== Restricted access ==
The western part of the district, a strip along the Narva River, is included into the border security zone, intended to protect the borders of Russia from unwanted activity. In order to visit the zone, a permit issued by the local Federal Security Service department is required.

== Economy ==
=== Industry ===
In the district, there are construction industry (including several cement plants), chemical industry, and food industry enterprises. The district has considerable deposits of oil shale, one of the most important in Russia. In fact the word "slantsy" in Russian means oil shale.

=== Agriculture ===
The main specialization of agriculture in the district is cattle breeding with meat and milk productions. As of 2012, there were for large-scale farms in the district, as well as one trout farm.

=== Transportation ===
A railway connects Slantsy with Gdov in the south and with Veymarn in the north. Originally, the railway connected Pskov with Veymarn. It was destroyed during World War II, and the stretch between Gdov and Pskov was never rebuilt.

Slantsy is connected by roads with Pskov via Gdov and with Kingisepp. There are also local roads, with bus traffic originating from Slantsy.

== Culture and recreation ==
The district contains thirty-seven objects classified as cultural and historical heritage of local significance (four of them in the town of Slantsy). Most of those commemorate events related to World War II.

The Slantsy Museum of History and Culture, located in the town of Slantsy and focusing on the history of the town, is the only state museum in the district.
