= Kingisepp =

Town in Leningrad Oblast, Russia

Kingisepp Кингисепп
- Town
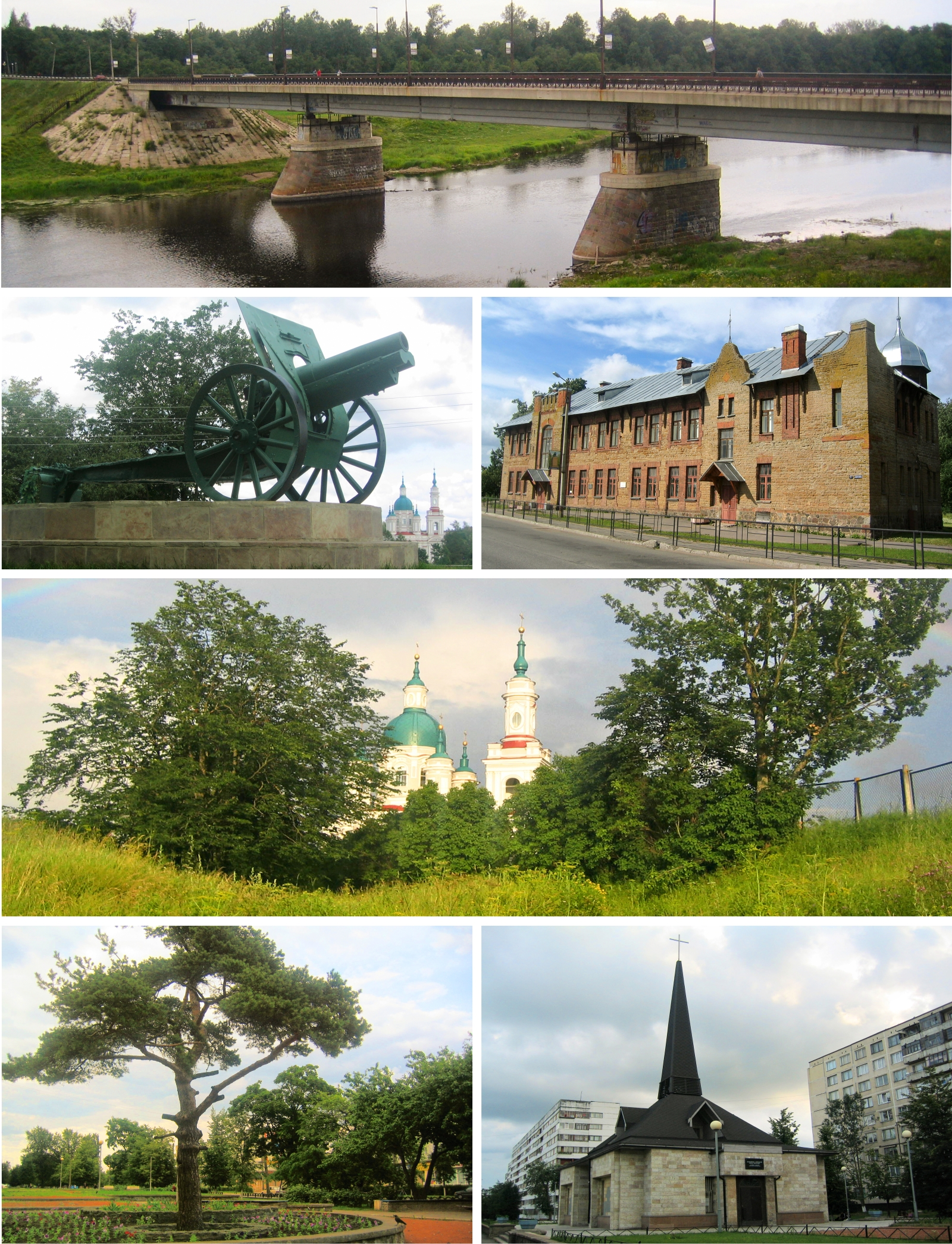
- Views of Kingisepp

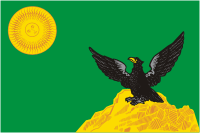
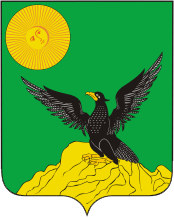
- Flag Coat of arms
- Interactive map of Kingisepp
- Location of Kingisepp Kingisepp (Leningrad Oblast)
- Coordinates: 59°22′N 28°37′E
- Country: Russia
- Federal subject: Leningrad Oblast
- Administrative district: Kingiseppsky District
- Settlement municipal formationSelsoviet: Kingiseppskoye Settlement Municipal Formation
- First mentioned: 1384
- Elevation: 25.6 m (84 ft)

Population (2010 Census)
  - Total: 48,488
  - Estimate (2024): 48,807 (+0.7%)
  - Rank: 327th in 2010

Administrative status
  - Capital of: Kingiseppsky District, Kingiseppskoye Settlement Municipal Formation

Municipal status
  - Municipal district: Kingiseppsky Municipal District
  - Urban settlement: Kingiseppskoye Urban Settlement
  - Capital of: Kingiseppsky Municipal District, Kingiseppskoye Urban Settlement
- Time zone: UTC+3 (MSK)
- Postal codes: 188480, 188482, 188485, 188487, 188489, 188499
- Dialing code: +7 81375
- OKTMO ID: 41621101001
- Website: www.kingisepp-mo.ru

Kingisepp (Russian: Кингисепп), formerly Yamburg (Ямбург), Yam (Ям), and Yama (Яма; Votic: Jaama), is a town and the administrative center of Kingiseppsky District of Leningrad Oblast, Russia, located along the Luga River 138 kilometers (86 mi) southwest of St. Petersburg, 20 kilometers (12 mi) east of Narva, and 40 kilometers (25 mi) south of the Gulf of Finland. Population: 48,488 (2010 census); 50,295 (2002 census); 49,954 (1989 Soviet census).

== History ==
=== 14th century ===
The town was first documented in 1384, when the Novgorodians under Patrikas built there a fortress against the Swedes. It was called Yama or Yamsky Gorodok, after the Izhorian (ethnic Finnic group) name Jaama. The environs of the town are still cited as the main location of speakers of the nearly extinct Izhorian language. The citadel withstood sieges by the Swedes in 1395 and by the Teutonic Knights during the 1444–1448 war.

=== 15–16th century ===
The town became the most important economic center of the Vodskaya pyatina of the Novgorod Republic. There were 201 homesteads in the 15th century in the town; its total population can only be evaluated roughly based on the estimates of three to five persons per homestead. At the end of the Livonian War, it was ceded to Sweden, only to be returned twelve years later, in 1595.

=== 17th century ===
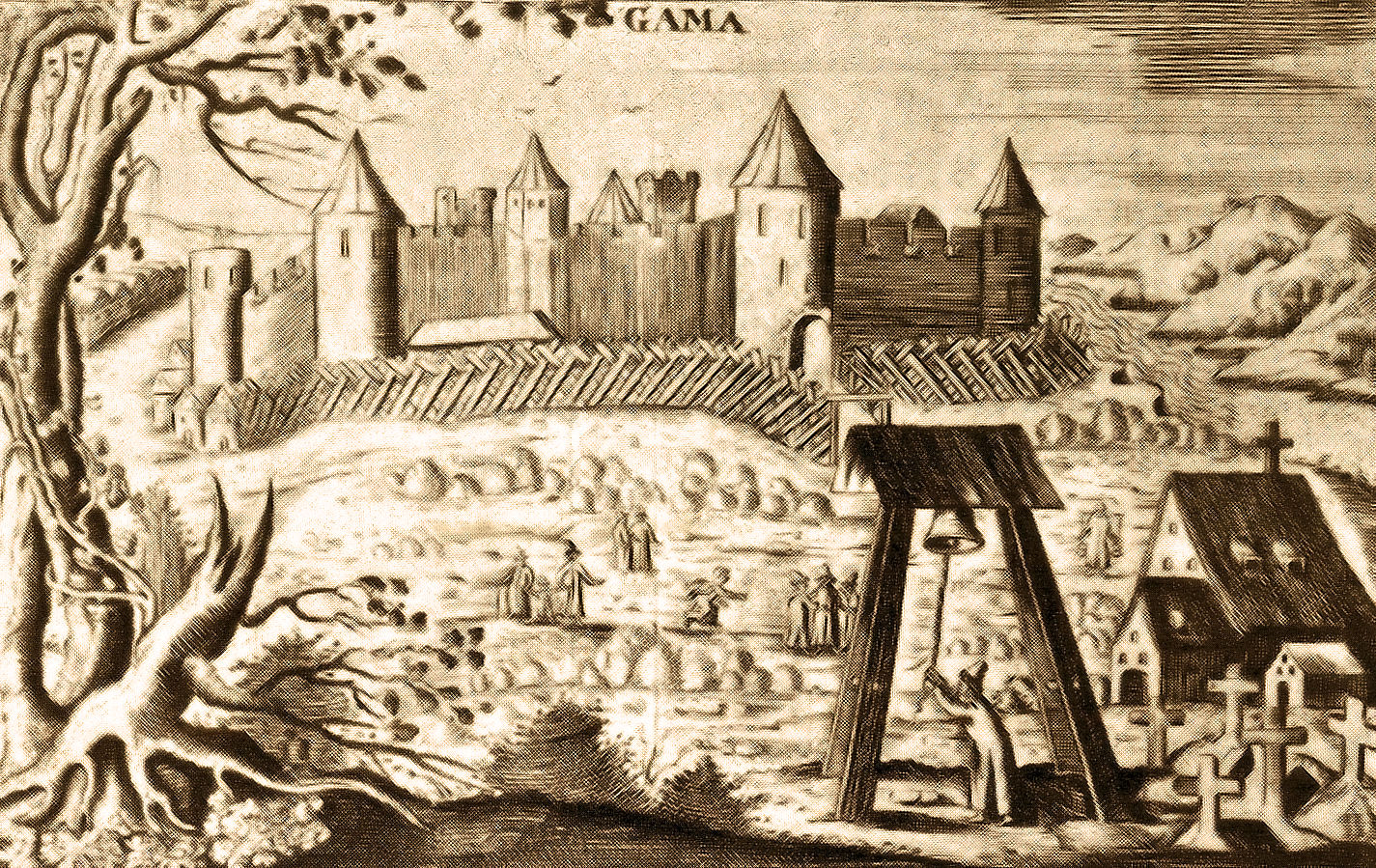
Swedish Jama in the 17th century

Following the Treaty of Stolbovo, it again passed to the Swedes, who kept the name which in Swedish orthography became Jama or Jamo. The town was completely destroyed by Russian armies during the war of 1656–1658, after which only the citadel remained intact. The Swedes demolished the citadel in 1681. It is questionable whether the town, with its exclusively Russian population, ever recovered.

=== 18th century ===
First held by the Russians for a month in late 1700, what was left of the citadel was finally taken by the Russians in the course of the Great Northern War in 1703. On May 14, 1703, Yam was renamed Yamburg (a German version of the name). Five years later, Peter the Great granted the town to Alexander Menshikov in his capacity of the Duke of Izhora. In the course of the administrative reform, Yamburg was included into Ingermanland Governorate (known since 1710 as Saint Petersburg Governorate). In 1780, Catherine the Great re-approved with some changes a previously existing coat of arms. Uyezd town status was granted to it in 1784.

=== 20th century ===
==== Russian Civil War ====
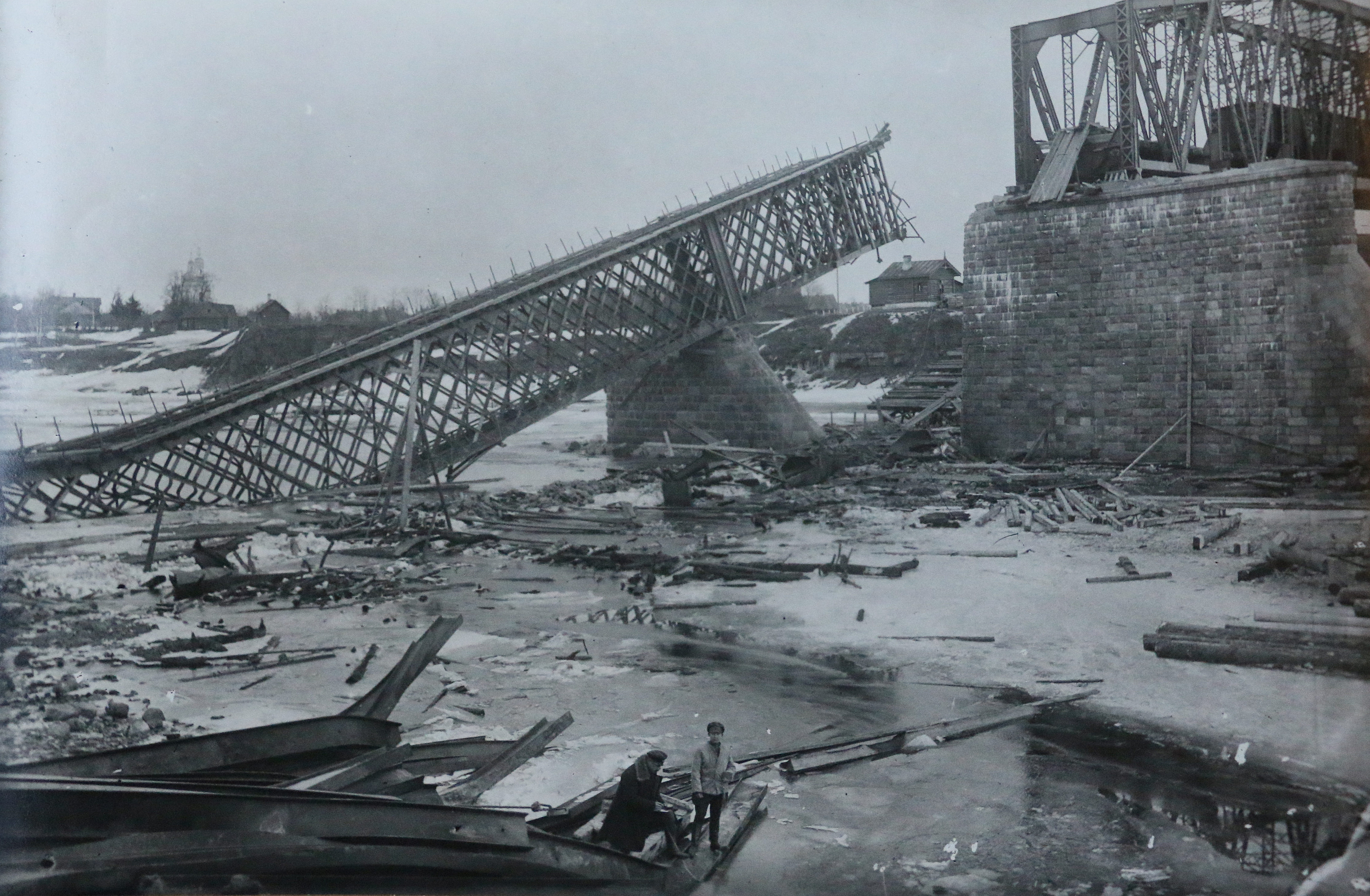
Yamburg Bridge, destroyed by the White Army, 1919

Vladimir Lenin reportedly stayed in Yamburg in January 1919, when he ordered the Bolshevik troops to retake the town of Narva from Estonian forces. In October 1919, the anti-Bolshevist commander, General Nikolai Yudenich captured Yamburg, which marked the beginning of the push by the Northwestern White Army towards Petrograd. However, the Bolsheviks subsequently re-captured Yamburg on November 14, 1919. On November 16, 1919, the forces of General Yudenich were "crowded together in a small space near Yamburg" "in a serious state of disorganization", reported The New York Times.

The German form of the town name was retained until 1922, when the Bolsheviks renamed it in honor of the exiled Estonian Communist leader Viktor Kingissepp.

==== Kingisepp–Gdov Offensive ====
During World War II, Kingisepp was occupied by German troops from August 16, 1941 until February 1, 1944, when the 109th Rifle Corps captured the town, forcing the German 18th Army into new positions on the eastern bank of Narva.

==== Administrative changes ====
In the beginning of the 20th century, Yamburg was the seat of Yamburgsky Uyezd of St. Petersburg Governorate (later known as Petrograd and Leningrad Governorate). On May 17, 1922, Yamburgsky Uyezd was renamed Kingiseppsky, simultaneously with the town.

On August 1, 1927, the uyezds were abolished and Kingiseppsky District, with the administrative center in Kingisepp, was established. The governorates were also abolished, and the district became a part of Leningrad Okrug of Leningrad Oblast. On July 23, 1930, the okrugs were abolished as well and the districts were directly subordinated to the oblast. Between March 22, 1935 and September 19, 1940, Kingisepp was the administrative center of Kingisepp Okrug of Leningrad Oblast, one of the okrugs abutting the state boundaries of the Soviet Union. After Kingisepp Okrug was abolished on September 19, 1940, Kingisepp became a town of oblast significance on December 17, 1940. In 2010, the administrative structure of Leningrad Oblast was harmonized with the municipal structure and Kingisepp became a town of district significance.

== Geography ==
=== Climate ===
Climate data for Kingisepp
Month	Jan	Feb	Mar	Apr	May	Jun	Jul	Aug	Sep	Oct	Nov	Dec	Year
Record high °C (°F)	8.6 (47.5)	10.3 (50.5)	17.6 (63.7)	27.0 (80.6)	33.2 (91.8)	34.9 (94.8)	33.6 (92.5)	35.0 (95.0)	29.9 (85.8)	21.0 (69.8)	13.0 (55.4)	11.6 (52.9)	35.0 (95.0)
Mean daily maximum °C (°F)	−2.5 (27.5)	−2.1 (28.2)	2.9 (37.2)	10.4 (50.7)	17.0 (62.6)	20.8 (69.4)	23.3 (73.9)	21.6 (70.9)	16.1 (61.0)	8.8 (47.8)	2.6 (36.7)	−0.6 (30.9)	9.9 (49.7)
Daily mean °C (°F)	−4.9 (23.2)	−5.2 (22.6)	−1.1 (30.0)	5.3 (41.5)	11.3 (52.3)	15.6 (60.1)	18.2 (64.8)	16.4 (61.5)	11.5 (52.7)	5.7 (42.3)	0.6 (33.1)	−2.6 (27.3)	5.9 (42.6)
Mean daily minimum °C (°F)	−7.5 (18.5)	−8.3 (17.1)	−5.0 (23.0)	0.6 (33.1)	5.4 (41.7)	10.2 (50.4)	13.1 (55.6)	11.6 (52.9)	7.5 (45.5)	2.8 (37.0)	−1.5 (29.3)	−4.8 (23.4)	2.0 (35.6)
Record low °C (°F)	−38.1 (−36.6)	−40.0 (−40.0)	−32.8 (−27.0)	−26.1 (−15.0)	−6.1 (21.0)	−1.1 (30.0)	2.8 (37.0)	0.0 (32.0)	−6.1 (21.0)	−12.8 (9.0)	−22.8 (−9.0)	−40.0 (−40.0)	−40.0 (−40.0)
Average precipitation mm (inches)	52 (2.0)	42 (1.7)	40 (1.6)	39 (1.5)	50 (2.0)	77 (3.0)	74 (2.9)	95 (3.7)	65 (2.6)	74 (2.9)	62 (2.4)	58 (2.3)	728 (28.6)
Source: www.pogodaiklimat.ru

== Administrative and municipal divisions ==
Within the framework of administrative divisions, Kingisepp serves as the administrative center of Kingiseppsky District. As an administrative division, it is, together with the village of Porkhovo, incorporated within Kingiseppsky District as Kingiseppskoye Settlement Municipal Formation. As a municipal division, Kingiseppskoye Settlement Municipal Formation is incorporated within Kingiseppsky Municipal District as Kingiseppskoye Urban Settlement.

== Economy ==
=== Industry ===
The economy of Kingisepp is based on chemical, glass, and food industries. It is the location for the EuroChem Northwest ammonia plant which has the largest single-train production capacity in Europe, at 1 million tpy.

=== Transportation ===
The railway connecting St. Petersburg with Tallinn passes through Kingisepp and has a railway station in it. There is infrequent suburban service to the Baltiysky railway station in St. Petersburg and to Ivangorod.

The A180 Highway, connecting St. Petersburg and Ivangorod, passes Kingisepp as well. It coincides with the European route E20 connecting St. Petersburg via Tallinn. Kingisepp is also connected by road with Volosovo and Slantsy.

== Culture ==
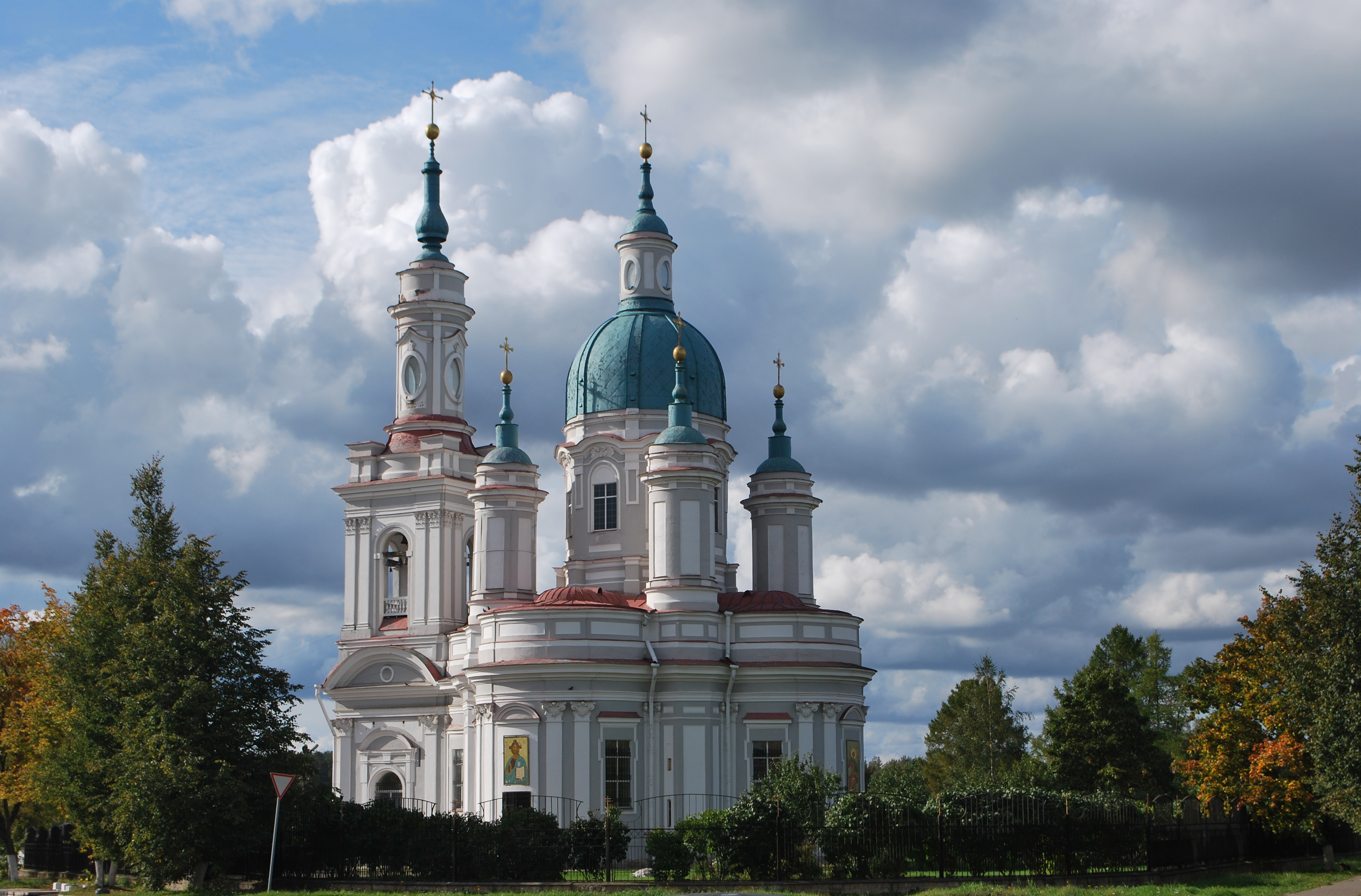
Yamburg's St. Catherine Cathedral was built in 1764–1782 to a late Baroque design by Antonio Rinaldi

Kingisepp contains thirteen cultural heritage monuments of federal significance and additionally seventeen objects classified as cultural and historical heritage of local significance. The federal monuments include the Yam Fortress, the Saint Catherine Cathedral, Kingisepp (by Antonio Rinaldi), and the complex of military barracks of the 19th century.

Kingisepp has a local history museum. It was open in 1960 and is located in the buildings of the St. Catherine Cathedral. In 1990, the cathedral was transferred to Russian Orthodox Church and the museum was closed until 1999, when it re-opened in the former building of the commercial school, an architecture monument.

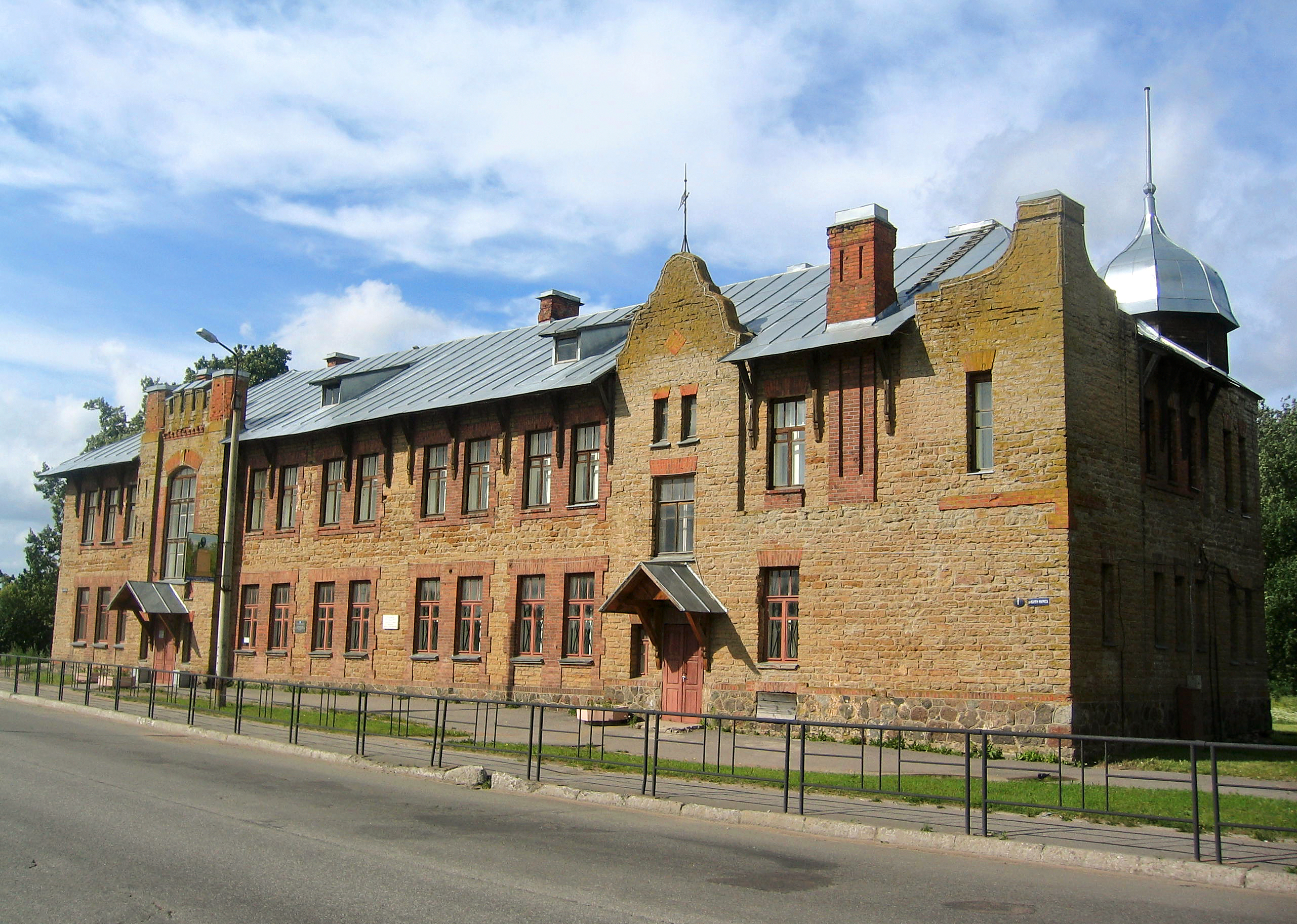
Kingisepp local museum

== Twin towns – sister cities ==
Kingisepp is twinned with:

- Bielsk Podlaski, Poland
- Jõhvi, Estonia
- Narvik, Norway
- (Georgia (country)) Pitsunda, Georgia
- Raisio, Finland
- Renhuai, China
- Sassnitz, Germany
- Svietlahorsk, Belarus

== Notable people ==
- Aleksei Ionov (1989), association football player
- Vera Karelina (1870–1931), labor activist and revolutionary
- Aleksandr Kerzhakov (1982), association football player
- Mikhail Kerzhakov (1987), association football player
- Pavel Mogilevets (1993), association football player
- Grigory Spiridonovich Petrov (1868–1925), politician
- Ivan Shpakov (1986), association football player
- Gustav Tammann (1861–1938), scientist
