= Izhorians =

Ethnic group

Izhorians Ижо́ра
- Flag of Izhorians

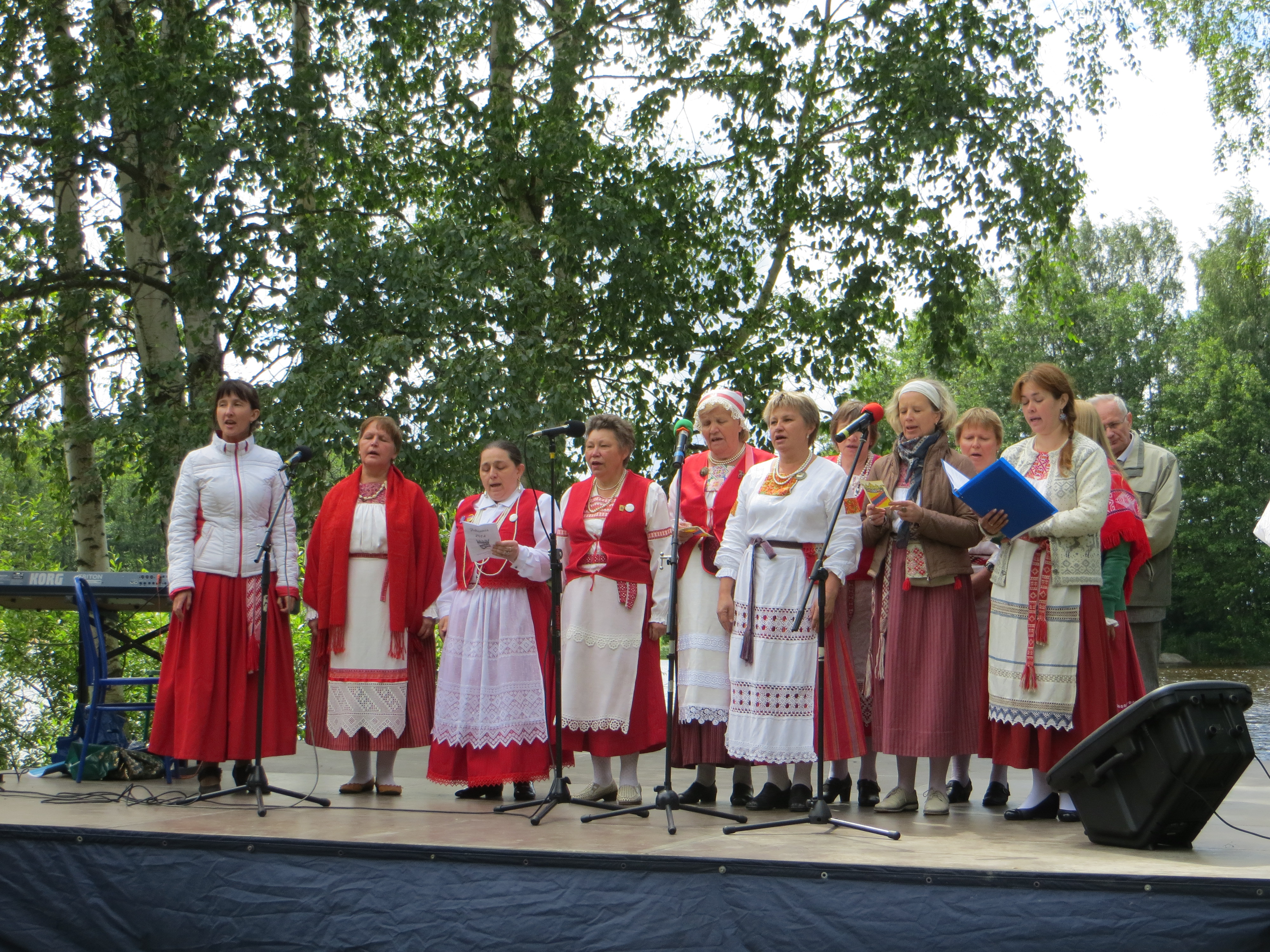
- Izhorian choir wearing the national costume

Total population
- ~1,000

Regions with significant populations
- Ukraine: 812 (2001)
- Russia: 781 (2021)
- Estonia: 56 (2011)
- Belarus: 8 (1999)
- Latvia: 1 (2018)

Languages
- Izhorian, Russian, Estonian

Religion
- Eastern Orthodox Christianity; Lutheran minority

Related ethnic groups
- Other Baltic Finns; Especially Votians, Karelians and Finns (particularly Ingrian Finns and Korlaks)

The Izhorians (Ingrian: ižorat, ižorit, inkeroiset; Russian: ижо́ра; ижо́ры, ижо́рцы; Finnish: inkerikot; Estonian: isurid) are a Finnic indigenous people native to Ingria. Small numbers can still be found in the western part of Ingria, between the Narva and Neva rivers in northwestern Russia. They are also referred to as Ingrians, although the term can also refer to the Ingrian Finns or the Baltic Finnic residents of Ingria in general.

== History ==
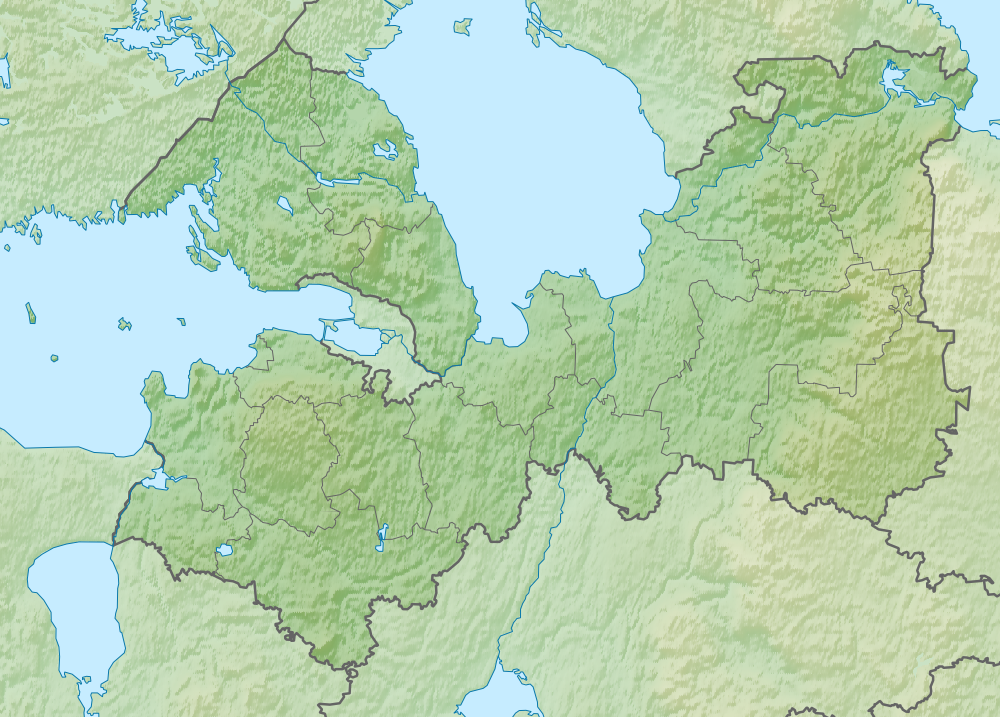
Leningrad Oblast, Russia, showing Kingisepp (Russian: Кингисепп)

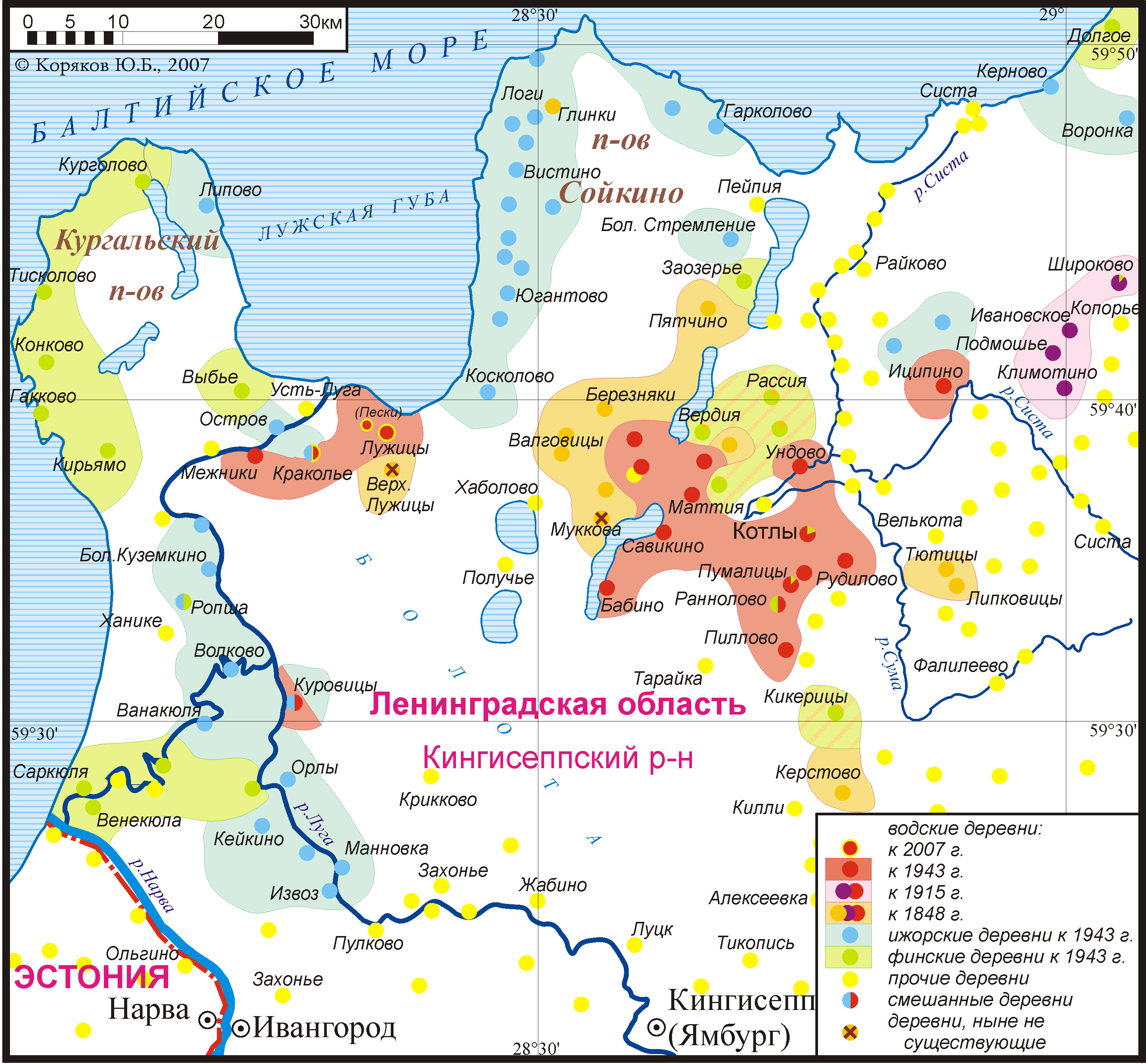
A map of Votic and neighbouring Ingrian-Finnish and Izhorian villages 1848–2007. Votic villages (1848-2007) Izhorian villages (by 1943) Finnish villages (by 1943) Other villages

The history of the Izhorians is bound to the history of Ingria. It is supposed that shortly after 1000 AD the Izhorians moved from Karelia to the west and south-west. In 1478, the Novgorod Republic, where Ingrians had settled, was united with the Grand Duchy of Moscow, and some of the Izhorians were deported to the Russian interior. The establishment of St Petersburg in 1703 had a great influence on Izhorian culture. World War II had the biggest impact on Izhorians, as devastating battles (such as the Siege of Leningrad) took place on their territory.

In 1848, Peter von Köppen counted 17,800 Izhorians, and by 1926 there were 26,137 Izhorians in the Russian SFSR. In the 1959 census, however, only 1,100 Izhorians were counted in the USSR. In 1989, 820 self-designated Izhorians, 302 of whom were speakers of the Ingrian language were registered. 449 Izhorians lived in the territory of the USSR. According to the 2002 Russian Census, there were 327 Izhorians in Russia, of whom 177 lived in Leningrad oblast and 53 in St Petersburg. There were also 812 Izhorians in Ukraine according to Ukrainian Census (2001) (more than in Russian Federation and Estonia altogether) and a further 358 Izhorians in Estonia.

== Language ==
Their language, close to Karelian, is used primarily by members of the older generation. Izhorian (also called Ingrian), along with Finnish, Ludic, Karelian and Vepsian, belongs to the Northern Finnic group of the Uralic languages.

In 1932–1937, a Latin-based orthography for the Izhorian language existed, taught in schools of the Soikinsky Peninsula and the area around the mouth of the Luga River. Several textbooks were published including a grammar of the language in 1936. However, in 1937 the Izhorian written language was abolished.

== Religion ==
The Izhorians and the Votes are generally Eastern Orthodox, in contrast to the Ingrian Finns, who are generally Lutheran. Some pre-Christian traditions exist also.

== Genetics ==
According to a 2024 study, the most common paternal haplogroup of the Izhorians is N1c, especially its subgroup N3a4. The haplogroup N is typical for Finno-Ugric peoples. Their other haplogroups include I1 and R1a. In terms of autosomal DNA, Izhorians resemble other Baltic Finns, particularly Ingrian Finns and Votians, and can be distinguished from the Slavic Russians.

== Gallery ==
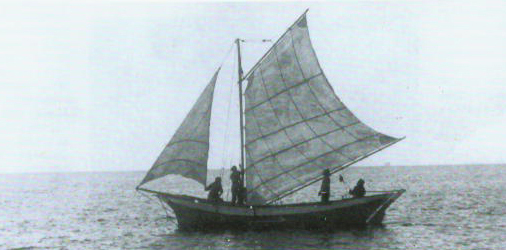
Laiba, an Izhorian vessel, in the Gulf of Finland

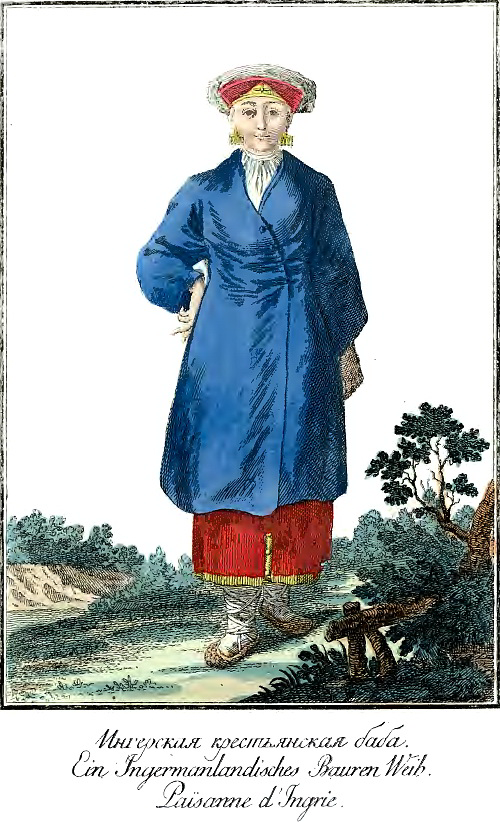
The ethnic clothing of Izhorian women (near Saint-Petersburg, Russia, in the 18th century)

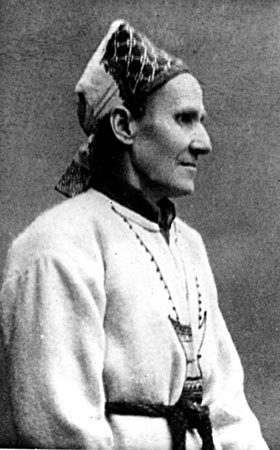
Larin Paraske, ethnic Izhorian oral poet

== Sources ==
- Williams, Victoria R. (24 February 2020). Indigenous Peoples: An Encyclopedia of Culture, History, and Threats to Survival [4 volumes]. Bloomsbury Publishing USA. pp. 495–498. ISBN 978-1-4408-6118-5.
