= Kingiseppsky District =

Kingiseppsky District Кингисеппский район (Russian)
- District
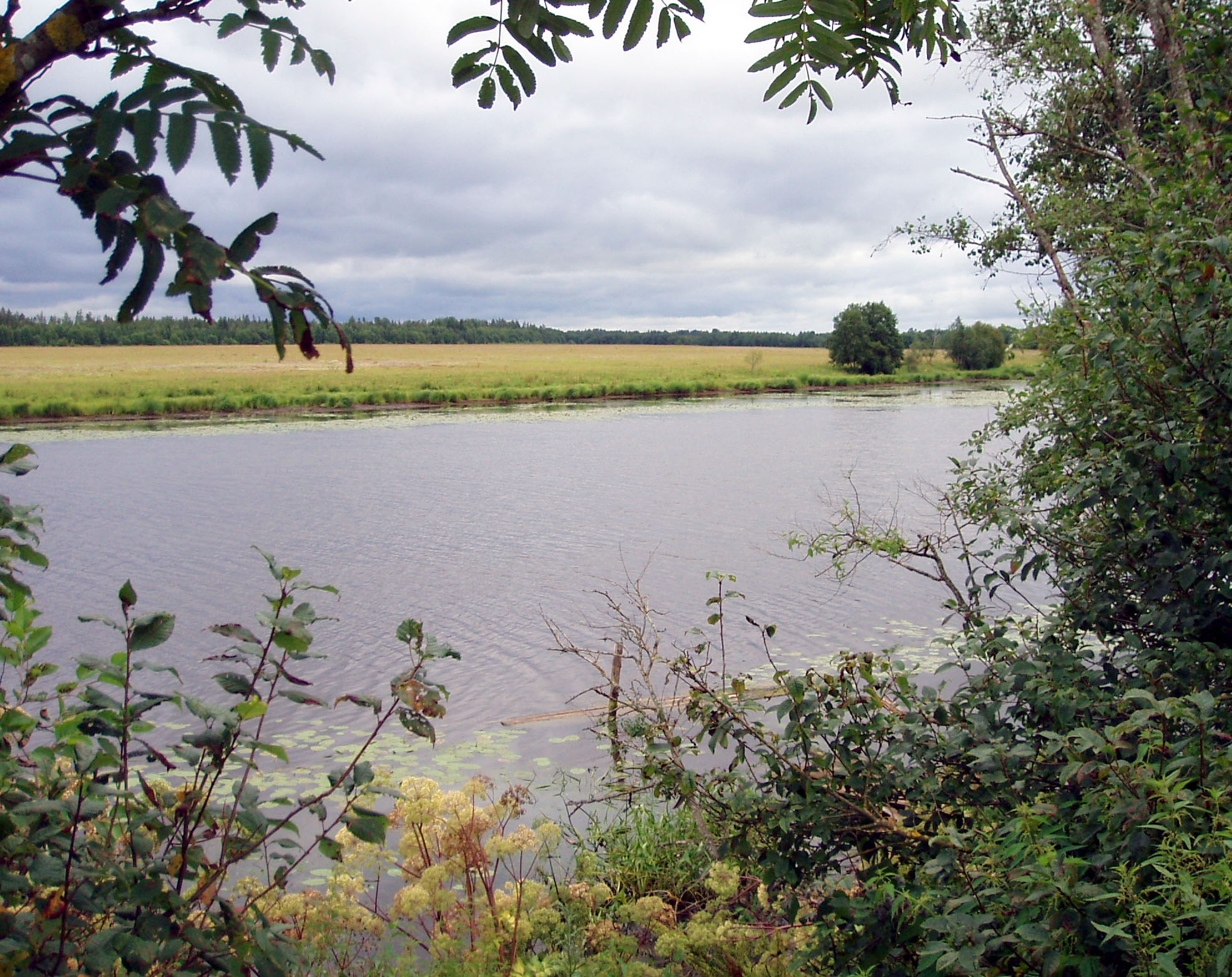
- Mertvitsa River in Kingiseppsky District

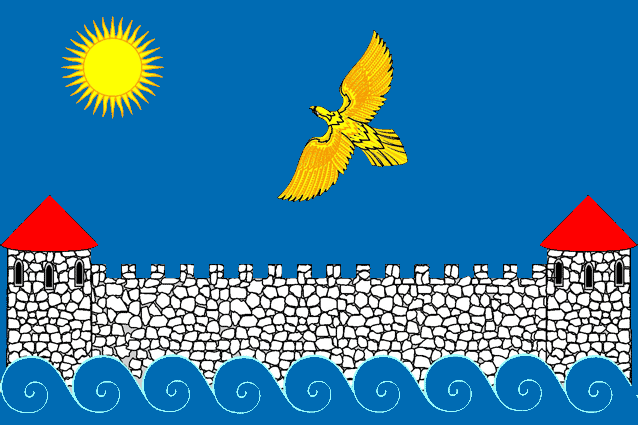
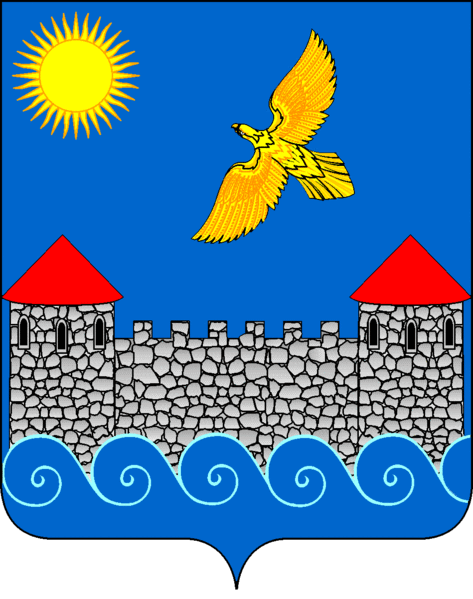
- Flag Coat of arms
- Location of Kingiseppsky District in Leningrad Oblast
- Coordinates: 59°22′N 28°36′E
- Country: Russia
- Federal subject: Leningrad Oblast
- Established: 1927
- Administrative center: Kingisepp

Area
  - Total: 2,908 km^{2} (1,123 sq mi)

Population (2010 Census)
  - Total: 78,183
  - Density: 26.89/km^{2} (69.63/sq mi)
  - Urban: 0%
  - Rural: 100%

Administrative structure
  - Administrative divisions: 9 settlement municipal formation
  - Inhabited localities: 2 cities/towns, 188 rural localities

Municipal structure
  - Municipally incorporated as: Kingiseppsky Municipal District
  - Municipal divisions: 2 urban settlements, 9 rural settlements
- Time zone: UTC+3 (MSK)
- OKTMO ID: 41621000
- Website: http://www.kingisepplo.ru/

Kingiseppsky District (Russian: Кингисе́ппский райо́н, Finnish: Kingiseppin piiri or Jaaman piiri) is an administrative and municipal district (raion), one of the seventeen in Leningrad Oblast, Russia. It is located in the southwest of the oblast and borders with Ida-Viru County of Estonia in the west, Lomonosovsky District in the northeast, Volosovsky District in the east, and with Slantsevsky District in the south. In the north and northwest it is washed by the waters of the Gulf of Finland. The area of the district is 2,908 square kilometers (1,123 sq mi). Its administrative center is the town of Kingisepp. Population (excluding the administrative center): 19,830 (2010 census); 20,408 (2002 Census); 34,081 (1989 Soviet census).. Including the entire district: 78,183 (2010 census);.

== Geography ==
The territory of the district is mostly flat with altitudes ranging from 0 to 150 meters (0 to 492 ft) above sea level. Main rivers include the Luga, the Narva, and the Plyussa. Narva Reservoir is located in the southern portion of the district. Agricultural lands constitute a significant portion of the district's territory. A number of islands in the Gulf of Finland belong to the district, including Gogland, Moshchny, and Seskar.

== History ==
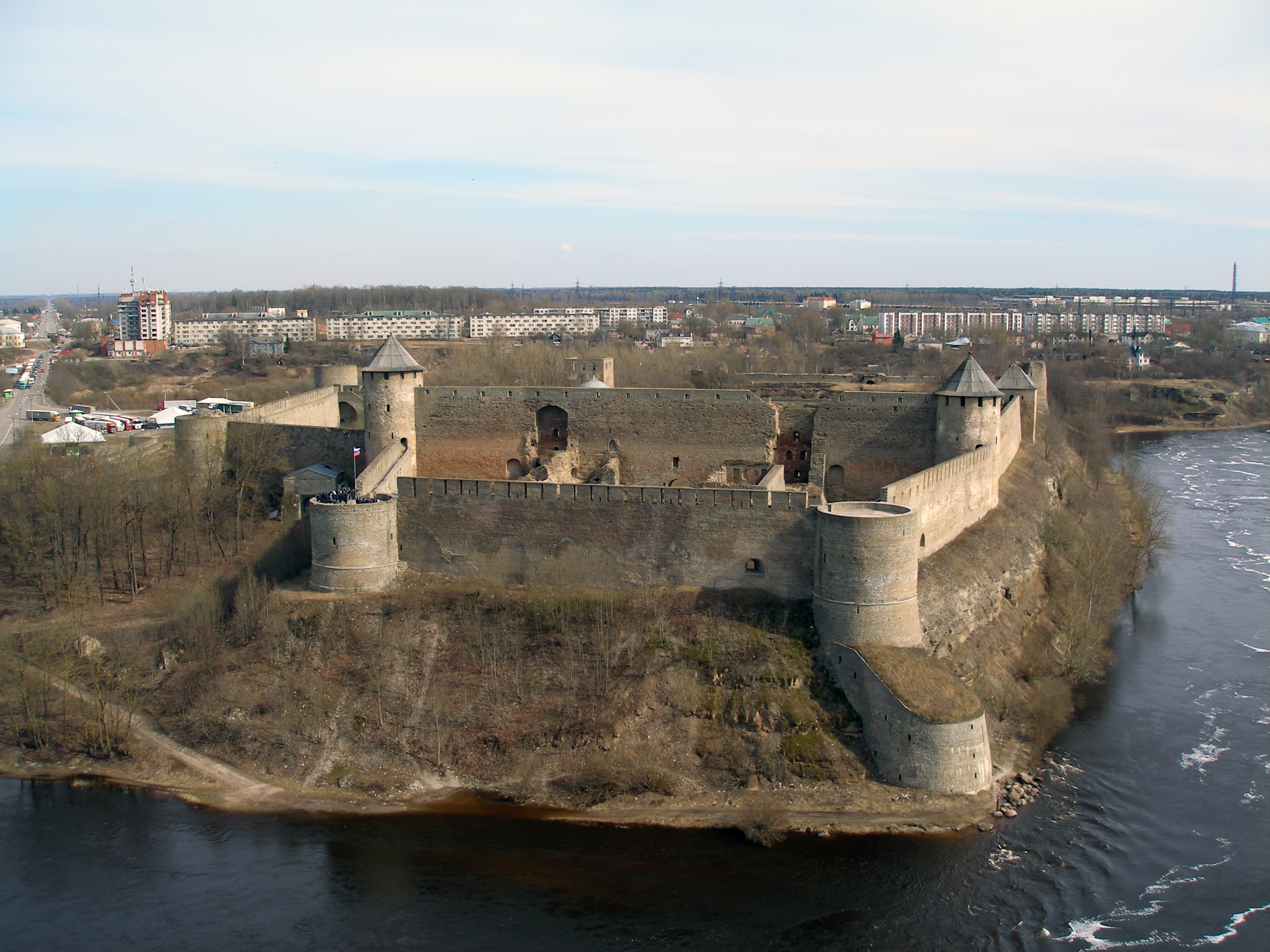
The Ivangorod Fortress from the left bank of the Narva River.

Originally, the area of the district was populated by Finnic peoples, until eventually, the Slavs began arriving. After the 9th century, the area east of the Luga River was dependent on the Novgorod Republic (from the 15th century, the Grand Duchy of Moscow). In 1384, the Yam fortress was founded to protect the western borders. Eventually, the lands between the Luga and the Narva were claimed by Russia as well, and in 1492 Ivan III founded the Ivangorod Fortress on the right bank of the Narva. The fortress is still considered to be the piece of art of fortification. The area was constantly at the frontier and became the battleground between Germans and Swedes, on one side, and Russians, on the other side. After the war between Russia and Sweden, the Treaty of Teusina in 1595 transferred the area to Russia. In 1617, according to the Treaty of Stolbovo, the area was transferred to Sweden, and in the 1700s, during the Great Northern War, it was conquered back by Russia.

In the course of the administrative reform carried out in 1708 by Peter the Great, the area was included into Ingermanland Governorate (known since 1710 as Saint Petersburg Governorate). It was later included into Yamburgsky Uyezd with the administrative center in Yamburg. In 1780, part of the area was transferred into newly established Narvsky Uyezd of Saint Petersburg Governorate. In 1796, Narvsky Uyezd was abolished and merged into Yamburgsky Uyezd. The governorate was renamed Petrograd in 1914 and Leningrad in 1924. In May 1922, Yamburg was renamed Kingisepp, and Yamburgsky Uyezd was renamed Kingiseppsky, to commemorate Viktor Kingissepp.

On August 1, 1927, the uyezds were abolished and Kingiseppsky District, with the administrative center in the town of Kingisepp, was established. The governorates were also abolished, and the district was a part of Leningrad Okrug of Leningrad Oblast. It included parts of former Kingiseppsky Uyezd. On July 23, 1930, the okrugs were abolished as well, and the districts were directly subordinated to the oblast. Between March 22, 1935 and September 19, 1940, the district was a part of Kingisepp Okrug of Leningrad Oblast, one of the okrugs abutting the state boundaries of the Soviet Union. After Kingisepp Okrug was abolished, Kigisepp became a town of oblast significance. In 1940, the islands in the Gulf of Finland (including Gogland and Moshchny), which previously belonged to Viipuri Province of Finland and were ceded to the Soviet Union following the Winter War, were transferred to Kingiseppsky District.

Between August 1941 and February 1944, during World War II, the district was occupied by German troops. In February 1944, the Kingisepp–Gdov Offensive, a military operation in which the Soviet Army advanced to the east bank of the Narva and of Lake Peipus, took place here. The town of Kingisepp was seriously damaged and rebuilt after the war. In 2010, the administrative division of Leningrad Oblast was harmonized with the municipal division, and Kingisepp was made the town of district significance.

The areas adjacent to the Narva River, including the town of Ivangorod, were assigned to Estonia in 1920, following the Estonian War of Independence and the Treaty of Tartu, signed on February 2, 1920. On November 24, 1944 this area was transferred to Leningrad Oblast and shared between Slantsevsky (south) and Kingiseppsky (north) Districts.

On August 1, 1927 Kotelsky District with the administrative center in the selo of Kotly was established as well. It was a part of Leningrad of Leningrad Oblast. It included areas which were previously parts of Gatchinsky and Kingiseppsky Uyezds. On September 20, 1931, Kotelsky District was abolished and merged into Kingiseppsky District.

Another district established on August 1, 1927 was Osminsky District with the administrative center in the selo of Osmino. It was a part of Luga Okrug of Leningrad Oblast. It included areas which were previously parts of Gdovsky, Luzhsky, and Kingiseppsky Uyezds. On July 23, 1930, the okrugs were abolished, and the districts were directly subordinated to the oblast. Between March 22, 1935 and September 19, 1940, Osminsky District was a part of Kingisepp Okrug of Leningrad Oblast. Between August 1941, and February 1944, Osminsky District was occupied by German troops. On August 2, 1961 Osminsky District was abolished and split between Slantsevsky and Volosovsky Districts. After the abortive administrative reform of the 1960s, its territory became split between Slantsevsky, Volosovsky, Luzhsky, and Kingiseppsky Districts.

== Restricted access ==
The western and northern part of the district, a strip along the Narva River, with the town of Ivangorod, and a strip along the coast of the Gulf of Finland, is included into the border security zone, intended to protect the borders of Russia from unwanted activity. In order to visit the zone, a permit issued by the local Federal Security Service department is required.

== Economy ==
=== Industry ===
The economy of the district is based on chemical, glass, and food industries. Also present is clothing industry, ferrous metallurgy, and production of construction materials.

The district has deposits of phosphorite, building sand, glass sand, and diatomaceous earth (abrasive).

=== Agriculture ===
Agriculture specializes in dairy cattle.

=== Transportation ===
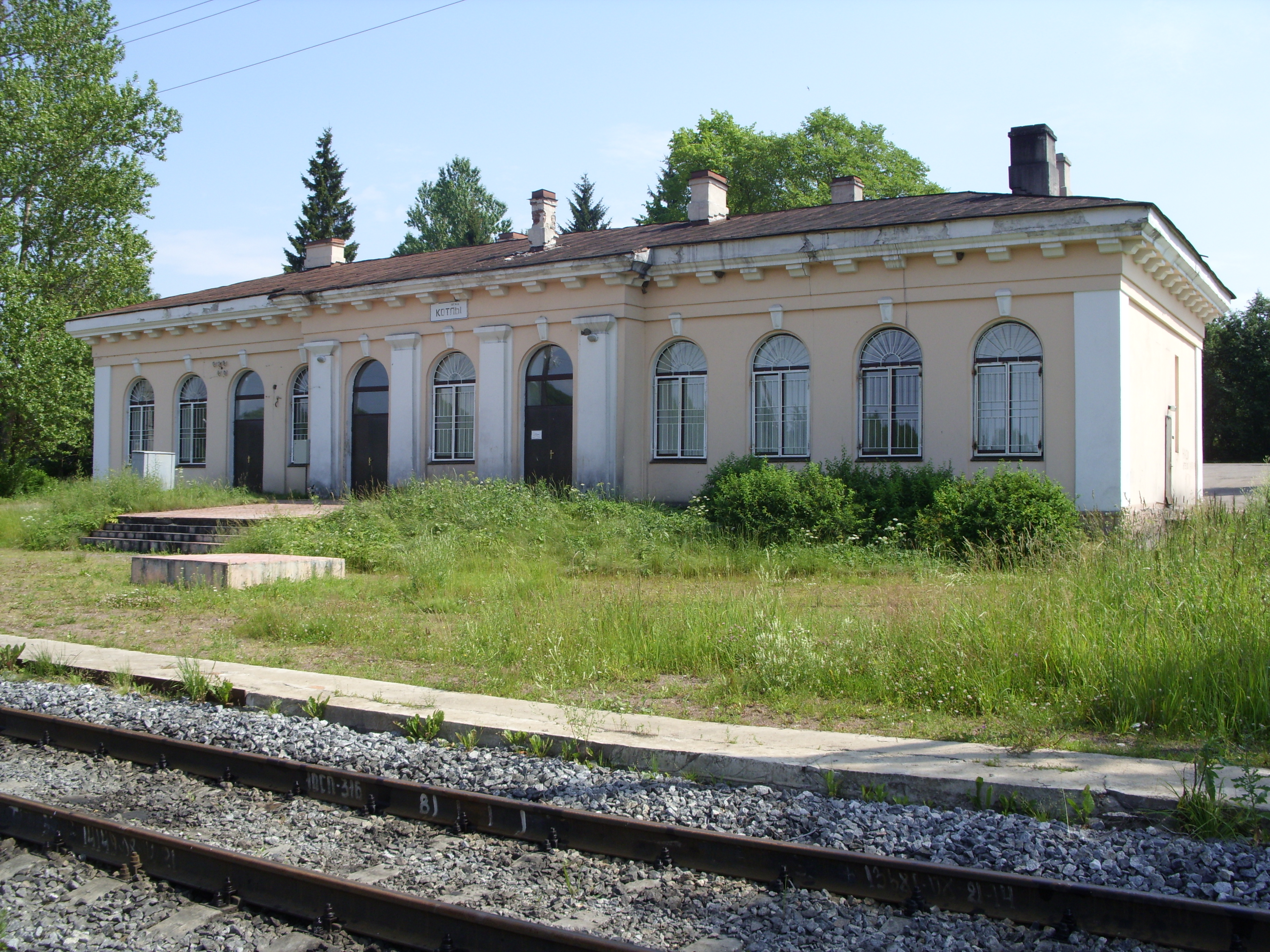
Kotly railway station

The railway connecting Saint Petersburg with Tallinn crosses the district from east to west. Both Kingisepp and Ivangorod are on this railway. Veymarn is an important node station. There, one railway branches off south and runs to Slantsy and Gdov. It was running all the way up to Pskov before World War II, but the stretch between Gdov and Pskov was destroyed during the war and never restored. Another railway runs north from Veymarn to Sosnovy Bor (Kalishche railway station) and to Saint Petersburg. Kotly is a node station and the starting point for the railway running to Ust-Luga. There is no passenger service between Veymarn and Ust-Luga or Kalishche. There is a passenger train between Saint Petersburg and Tallinn, which stops both in Kingisepp and Ivangorod.

The A180 highway, connecting Saint Petersburg and Ivangorod, crosses the district from east to west, passing through Kingisepp. It coincides with the European route E20 connecting Saint Petersburg via Tallinn with Shannon Airport. Kingisepp is connected by road with Volosovo and Slantsy. Generally, the district has an extensive network of local roads.

Ust-Luga is the site of an important coal and fertiliser terminal. It also serves as the northern end of the Baltic Pipeline System-II.

== Demographics ==
The critically endangered Votic language is spoken in two villages.

== Administrative and territorial structure ==
As of 2023, as an administrative district, it is subdivided into selsoviets, towns, and urban-type settlements. As a municipal district, it is subdivided into 11 settlements, of which 2 are urban settlements and 9 are rural settlements: Settlement

Administrative Center

Большелуцкое сельское поселение

Кингисеппский, поселок

Вистинское сельское поселение

Вистино, деревня

Ивангородское городское поселение

Ивангород, город

Кингисеппское городское поселение

Кингисепп, город

Котельское сельское поселение

Котельский, поселок

Кузёмкинское сельское поселение

Большое Кузёмкино, деревня

Нежновское сельское поселение

Нежново, деревня

Опольевское сельское поселение

Ополье, деревня

Пустомержское сельское поселение

Большая Пустомержа, деревня

Усть-Лужское сельское поселение

Усть-Луга, поселок

Фалилеевское сельское поселение

Фалилеево, деревня

In total, it has 190 separate populated places.

== Culture ==
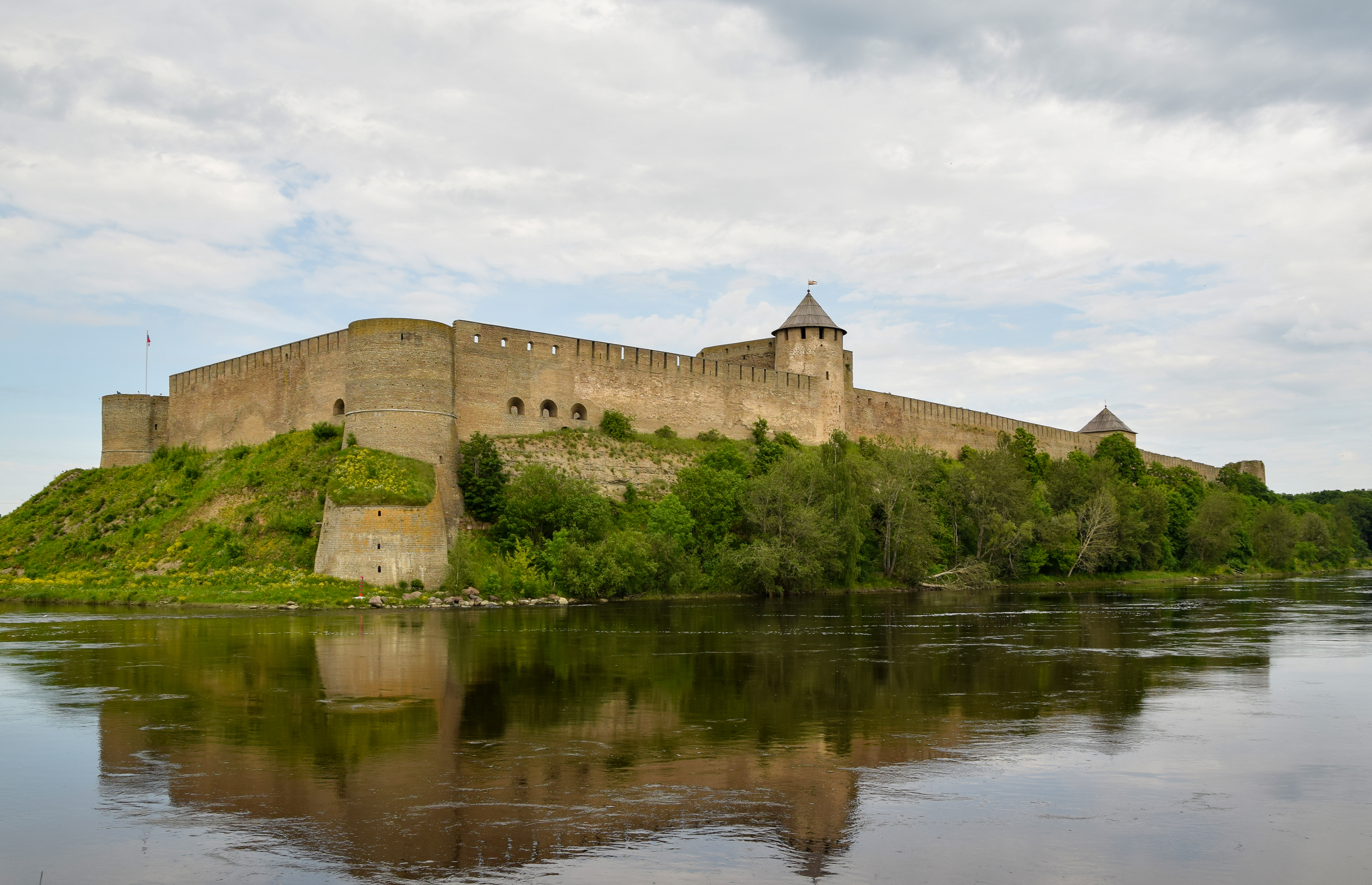
The Ivangorod Fortress

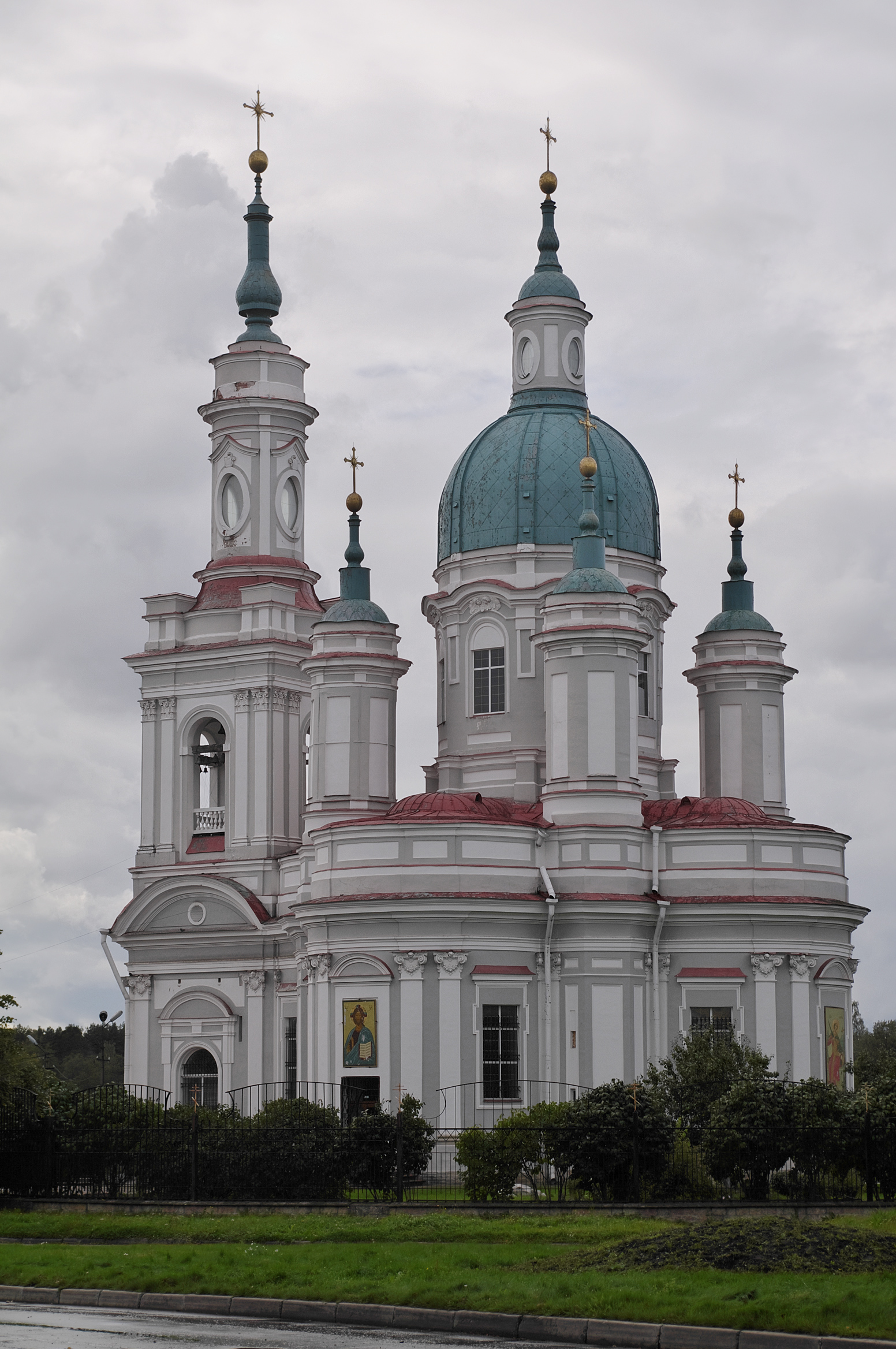
The Saint Catherine Cathedral, Kingisepp

The district contains 67 cultural heritage monuments of federal significance and additionally 219 objects classified as cultural and historical heritage of local significance. The federal monuments include the main attractions of the district such as the Yam Fortress and the Saint Catherine Cathedral (by Antonio Rinaldi) in Kingisepp, the Ivangorod Fortress in the town of Ivangorod, and the estates in Kotly and in Opolye.

There are the museum of Izhorians in the village of Vistino and the museum of local history in Kingisepp. The Ivangorod fortress functions as a museum as well.

== People born in the district ==
- Mia Boyka, singer
