= Siberian Finnish =

Form of Finnish spoken in Siberia

- Korlakan kieli
- Native to: Russia
- Region: Siberia
- Ethnicity: Siberian Finns
- Speakers: L1: 15; L2: 30-60
- Language family: Uralic: Finnic; Northern Finnic; Finnish; Siberian Finnish

Language codes
- ISO 639-3: –
- IETF: fi-RU
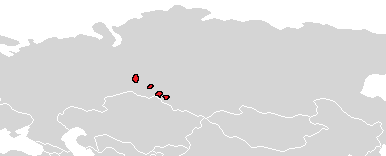
- Siberian Finnish map

Siberian Finnish or Korlaka is the form of Finnish spoken in Siberia by the Siberian Finns. Siberian Finnish is an umbrella name, this name refers to at least two languages/dialects.

The first language is a Lower Luga Ingrian Finnish – Lower Luga Ingrian (Izhorian) mixed language. The ancestors of the speakers of this language migrated from the Lower Luga area (more exactly Rosson river area, Yamburgsky Uyezd of the Saint Petersburg Governorate) to Siberia in 1803–1804. The academic name for this language is Siberian Ingrian Finnish (Russian: Сибирский ингерманландский идиом, romanized: Sibirsky ingermanlandsky idiom), and native speakers call this language suomen kiel', mejjen kiel', oma kiel'. Most native speakers (as of 2022) of this language live in Ryzhkovo village, as well as near Ryzhkovo, in Omsk and in Tallinn (Estonia).

The second Finnish language in Siberia is a language spoken by the descendants of exiles from the Grand Duchy of Finland and repressed people of Finnish ethnic origin during the Soviet period. This language is close to standard Finnish (probably based on Eastern Finnish dialects and has borrowings from Estonian and Russian). Several native speakers of this language live in Omsk, and a few isolated native speakers of it live in other settlements of the Omsk Region (Orlovka, probably Ivanovka and Kovalevo).

Siberian Finnish differs depending on the background of the speaker and their education level. Most speakers of Siberian Finnish are old and the Finnish skills of the Siberian Finns are being lost.

Some speakers of Siberian Finns have lived in Ryzhkovo, Orlovka, Bugene (another name for this village is "Finy" (Russian: Фины), this village has not been inhabited since about 2010), and Ivanovka.

== History of Siberian Finnish studies ==
Vieno Zlobina suspected high influence from Siberian Estonians in Siberian Finnish, however Ruben Erik Nirvi theorized that the similar features came before going into Siberia, such as the comitative ending -kä/ka. Estonian scientists (Jüri Viikberg, Anu Korb, Aivar Jürgenson) had conducted large-scale studies devoted to the Siberian Estonians. During these expeditions, they discovered complex interactions between Finnish-speaking ethnic groups and the groups in which they (Estonian and Finnish ethnic and linguistic components) were in interaction with. Daria Sidorkevich from the Institute for Linguistic Studies of the Russian Academy of Sciences researched and documented the Siberian Ingrian Finnish language in 2008–2014, culminating in a doctoral thesis about this language in 2013–14. Siberian Ingrian Finnish was also researched and documented by Mehmet Muslimov from the Institute for Linguistic Studies of the RAS, Fedor Rozhanskiy from the University of Tartu, Natalia Kuznetsova from the Università Cattolica del Sacro Cuore, and Ivan Ubaleht from the Omsk State Technical University. Ruslan Haarala did a study on Siberian Finnish in 2005. Finnish speakers can still be found inside Siberia. According to Haarala, it is possible to improve the situation of Siberian Finnish, because it is still being used.

== Examples of Siberian Finnish ==
- Tere! = hello
- saatko arvoa = do you understand
- Juttele eestis tai suomeks, daže ryssäki käyb = speak in Estonian or Finnish, well even Russian works
- gorod (Rus.), linna = city
- dom (Rus.), tuba = house
- otpusk (Rus.) = vacation
- ulitsa (Rus.), tänävä = road
- elänikot = people
- saada arvoa = to understand
- kõik = all
- aek = time
- hän õppib = he learns
- lapsenka = with a child
- syntysin = I was born
- käsiinkä = with hands
- korlaka = Siberian Finn
- piam menem penssiäm pääl = I am soon retiring
- tirehtoori = director
- juure = into
- daže (Rus.) = even
- hevosenka = on a horse

Siberian Finnish	Finnish	English
No, täl kaik viäl ympärin venäläiset, venäläiset. Ja nämä last nuaret venäjäks puhuvat, kuka eivät kehta vrode, et huanasti tulee ulos ni, nii venäjä enemän kaikkia, no.	No, täällä kaikki vielä ympärin venäläiset, venäläiset. Ja nämä lapset nuoret venäjäksi puhuvat, ketkä eivät kehtaa niin kuin että huonosti tulee ulos niin, niin venäjä enemmän kaikkea, no.	Well, here there are still Russians around, Russians. And these young children speak Russian, whoever doesn't dare it seems, so badly (it) comes out so, so that Russian more than all, well.

== Grammar ==
Some grammatical elements in Siberian Finnish are the comitative ending -ka/kä, the 3rd person singular ending -b, and the imperfect suffix -si-.

== Lexicon ==
Siberian Finnish has a large Russian influence, such as "vnuki" 'grandchild', "izvenenija" 'sorry' and "tak praela" 'right?'.
