= Siberian Ingrian Finnish =

Ingrian Finnish – Ingrian mixed language

- mejjen kiel', oma kiel', suomen kiel'
- Native to: Russia
- Region: Western Siberia
- Ethnicity: Siberian Finns, Estonians
- Native speakers: ≥15, ~100 with some knowledge (2022)
- Language family: Uralic: Finnic; Northern Finnic; Siberian Ingrian Finnish
- Writing system: Latin, Cyrillic

Language codes
- ISO 639-3: –
- Glottolog: sibe1253
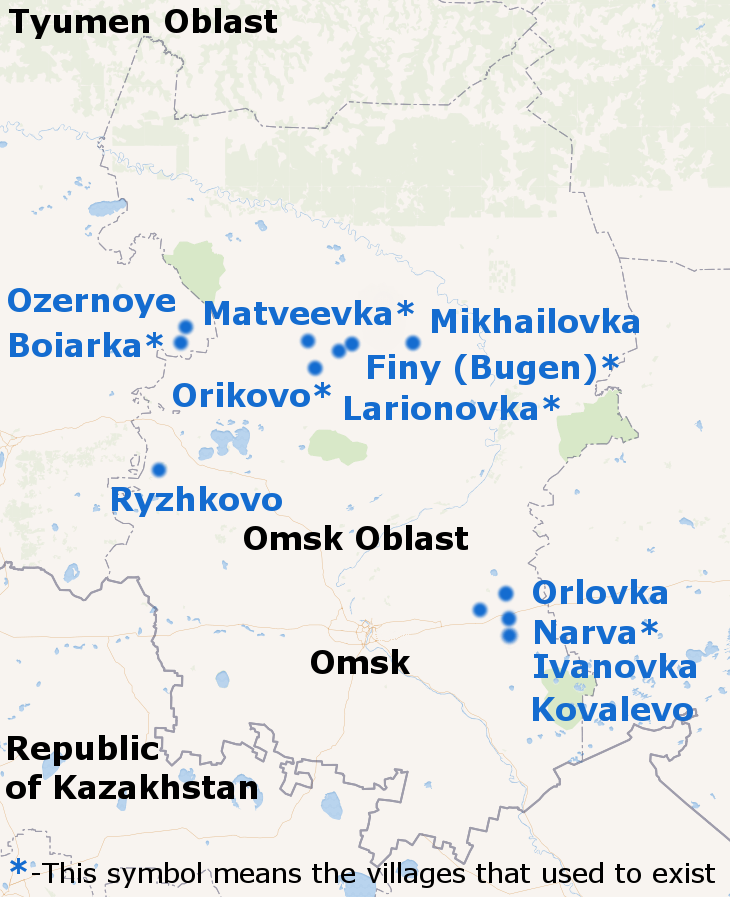
- Settlements where Siberian Ingrian Finnish speakers lived or still live as of 2022

Siberian Ingrian Finnish (Russian: Сибирский ингерманландский идиом) is a Lower Luga Ingrian Finnish – Lower Luga Ingrian (Izhorian) mixed language. The ancestors of the speakers of this language migrated from the Rosson river area to Siberia in 1803–1804. Most native speakers of this language live in Ryzhkovo or nearby, as well as in Omsk and Tallinn (Estonia).

== History ==
In the autumn of 1802, due to disobedience to their landowners, several dozen people with their families from the villages of Vanakülä, Malaya Arsiya, Bolshaya Arsiya, Volkovo, Mertvitsa, Fedorovka, and Variva were exiled to Siberia. They arrived in the Kamyshinskaya volost of the Tobolsk Governorate in 1804.

When the settlers founded the village, the name of the settlement was Chukhonskaya village (Russian: деревня Чухонская). The settlement also became known as Ryzhkovo (Russian: Рыжково). Here, Siberian Ingrian Finnish as a language of communication was formed based on the Ingrian Finnish and Ingrian dialects of the villages of the lower reaches of the Luga River among migrants in the first decades of the 19th century.

In the second half of the 1840s, Ryzhkovo became a place of exile for people of the Lutheran confession. In April 1846, there was a fire in Ryzhkovo. After the fire, 20 families of Ingrian Finns moved north to the Tara Uezd of the Tobolsk Governorate. Here on the Bugen River, among forests and swamps, they founded a settlement named Bugene. This settlement was later renamed Finy. In the vicinity of Bugene, by the end of the 19th century, 3 villages (Orikovo, Matveevka (Välikülä), Larionovka (Unkurin külä)) appeared, which were founded by the Ingrian Finns.

In 1849, another group of Ingrian Finns from Ryzhkovo in the Panovskaya volost, west of Ryzhkovo, founded the village of Boiarka. A new Lutheran colony (Om' koloniya) appeared on the banks of the Om River, in 1863. The following villages were part of this colony: Staraya Riga village, Stary Revel village (Viron külä), Gelsingfors (Ruotsin külä), Narva village (Suomen külä). The village of Narva was meant for the Ingrian Finns from Ryzhkovo. Settlers from the Ingrian Finnish village of Narva in 1895 founded the village of Ivanovka.

The Siberian Ingrian Finnish speakers made rather long migrations in Siberia. In the 19th century, part of the Siberian Ingrian Finnish speakers migrated to a distance of two thousand kilometers to the village of Verkhny Suetuk beyond the river Yenisey (now Krasnoyarsk Krai), and Ingrian peasants from the village of Finy founded a settlement not far from Altai, on the banks of the Kulunda River, 500 km from Omsk.

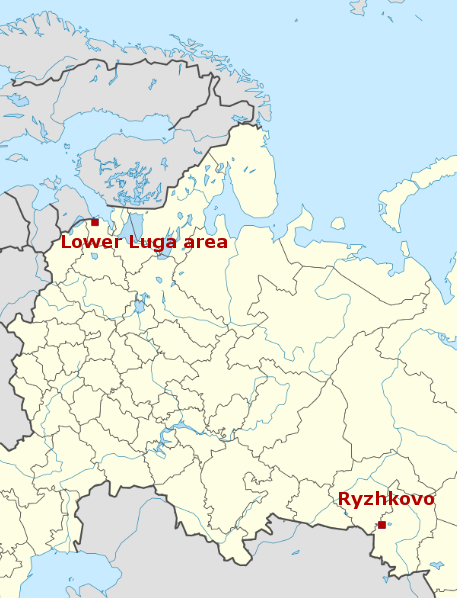
Migration of the ancestors of Siberian Ingrian Finnish speakers from the Lower Luga area to Siberia in 1803–1804. The image uses a modern map.

== Documentation ==
The first mentions of the exiles from western Ingria and about their first colony - the village of Ryzhkovo appeared in the two articles in 1844 and in 1846 in the newspaper "Maamiehen Ystävä", which was published in the Grand Duchy of Finland. Matthias Castrén's article was one of the first publications about the exiled Finns in Siberia. In this article, Ingrian Finns were also mentioned. The next publication was a book of memoirs by the Lutheran pastor Johannes Granö, who lived and worked in the Finnish settlements in Siberia at the end of the 19th century. The historiographic description of the Siberian Finnish settlements was continued by the sons of pastor Granö, Johannes Gabriel Granö and Paavo Granö. From the second half of the 20th century to the beginning of the 21st century, appeared several publications by Finnish researchers (Alpo Juntunen, Juha Saari, Max Engman) based on documents from the Finnish archives about the Lutherans exiled to Siberia.

In 1968–1969, the only expedition to Siberian Finnish settlements to study Siberian Finnish dialects was made by Vieno Zlobina from the Petrozavodsk State University. The Finnish researcher Ruben Nirvi got acquainted with Zlobina's Siberian language materials and made more accurate conclusions about the Siberian Ingrian Finnish language. Information about the Siberian Finns is also in the publications of Estonian scientists (Jüri Viikberg, Anu Korb, Aivar Jürgenson).

A detailed study of the Siberian Ingrian Finnish language was begun at the beginning of the 21st century by Russian scientists. Daria Sidorkevich from the Institute for Linguistic Studies of the Russian Academy of Sciences researched and documented the Siberian Ingrian Finnish language in 2008 - 2014. A PhD thesis about the language was written by Daria Sidorkevich in 2013 - 2014. The Siberian Ingrian Finnish language was also researched and documented by Mehmet Muslimov from the Institute for Linguistic Studies of the RAS, Fedor Rozhanskiy from the University of Tartu and Natalia Kuznetsova from the Università Cattolica del Sacro Cuore.

== Name ==
The term Siberian Ingrian Finnish (Russian: Сибирский ингерманландский идиом) for the language of the descendants of settlers from Ingria was introduced by Russian linguists and appeared in Sidorkevich's scientific works. Natalia Kuznetsova uses a similar term in her articles: "Siberian Ingrian/Finnish" or "the mixed Siberian Ingrian/Finnish variety". The Glottolog language database also uses the name Siberian Ingrian Finnish.

Vieno Zlobina in her articles introduced the term "корлаки" or "korlakat" (English: Korlaks) to refer to a group of people using the Siberian Ingrian Finnish language. Currently, this name is known and used in Finland. From this name came one of the names of this language: language of Korlaks (Russian: корлакский язык, Finnish: korlakan kieli). The speakers of Siberian Ingrian Finnish have never used the name "корлаки" or "korlakat" (English: Korlaks) as a self-name (although some speakers knew the term).

== Phonology ==
=== Vowels ===
The Siberian Ingrian Finnish language has the following vowels:

		Front		Central		Back	
		short	long	short	long	short	long
Close	unrounded	i	ii				
Close	rounded	ü	üü			u	uu
Mid	unrounded	e	ee	ə		ɨ	
Mid	rounded	ö				o	
Open	unrounded	ä	ää			a	aa

=== Diphthongs ===
The number of diphthongs in Siberian Ingrian Finnish is less than in Votic, some dialects of Ingrian (Izhorian), Estonian and Finnish. Diphthongs of Siberian Ingrian Finnish are shown in the table:

	i	a	o	u	ä	ö	ü	e	ə
i		ia sial pig.ALL/ADE	io sion tie.IPF.1SG	iu hius hair	*	*	*	*	iə tiə road
a	ai maitᵒ milk		ao maot worm.PL	au laula song.PRT				ae laen ceiling.GEN	*
o	oi koir dog	oa soan war.GEN		ou loun lunch (dinner)				oe joen river.GEN	*
u	ui luin read.IPF.1SG	ua tuan hut.GEN	*					ue luen read.PRS.1SG	uə suəl' salt
ä	äi jäi stay.IPF.3SG					äö näöt face.PL	äü käüp walk(go).PRS.3SG	äe näet see.PRS.2SG	
ö	öi löin beat.IPF.1SG				*		öü höür' steam (vapor)	*	*
ü	üi püis catch.IPF.3SG				üä süän heart	*		*	üə hüə 3PL
e	ei keitin cook.IPF.1SG	*	*	eu neulᵊ needle	*	*	*		
ə									
ɨ									

Within a diphthong, a combination of front and back vowels is unacceptable (a, o, u vs. ä, ö, ü), except for the vowels: i and e, which can combine with both front vowels and back vowels. The symbol "*" in the table above means that these diphthongs are theoretically possible in Siberian Ingrian Finnish, but the words containing these sounds have not yet been found in the audio data. The gray color in the cells of the table means that such a combination of vowels in diphthongs is completely impossible.

=== Consonants ===
The consonant inventory of Siberian Ingrian Finnish is distinguished by a large number of various phonemes that appeared in the language as a result of the reduction of vowels and as a result of borrowings from other languages. The symbol ⟨*⟩ in the two tables below indicates that these consonants are possible, but the words containing these sounds have not yet been found in the audio data.

Siberian Ingrian Finnish has the following consonants:

			Labial		Alveolar		Palatal		Velar	
			plain	pal.	plain	pal.	plain	pal.	plain	pal.
Nasal		plain	m	mʲ	n	nʲ				
Nasal		geminate	mː	mʲː	nː	nʲː				
Plosive/ Affricate	voiceless	plain	p	pʲ	t	tʲ	tʃ	*	k	kʲ
Plosive/ Affricate	voiceless	geminate	pː	pʲː	tː	tʲː	tʃː		kː	kʲː
Plosive/ Affricate	voiced	plain	b	bʲ	d	dʲ			g	gʲ
Plosive/ Affricate	voiced	geminate	bː	*	dː	dʲː			gː	*
Fricative	voiceless	plain	f	fʲ	s	sʲ	ʃ	ɕ	x	xʲ
Fricative	voiceless	geminate	fː		sː	sʲː	*	ɕː	xː	*
Fricative	voiced	plain	v	vʲ	z	zʲ	ʒ	*		
Fricative	voiced	geminate	vː	vʲː	zː	*	ʒː	*		
Approximant	median	plain			r	rʲ	j	*		
Approximant	median	geminate			rː	rʲː	jː	*		
Approximant	lateral	plain			l	lʲ				
Approximant	lateral	geminate			lː	lʲː				

==== Additional series ====
These consonant sounds appear in word-final position. The appearance of these consonant sounds is the result of vowel reduction in word-final position. The additional series is modified by aspiration (appears unstable), palatalization, labialization, and labio-palatalization.

The additional series of consonants are shown in the table:

			Labial				Alveolar				Palatal				Velar			
			asp.	pal.	lab.	lab-pal.	asp.	pal.	lab.	lab-pal.	asp.	pal.	lab.	lab-pal.	asp.	pal.	lab.	lab-pal.
Nasal		plain	mʰ	mʲ	mʷ	mᶣ	nʰ	nʲ	nʷ	nᶣ								
Nasal		geminate	mʰː	mʲː	*	*	*	nʲː	*	*								
Plosive/ Affricate	voiceless	plain	pʰː	pʲ	pʷ	pᶣ	tʰ	tʲ	tʷ	tᶣ	tʃʰ		*	*	kʰ	kʲ	kʷ	kᶣ
Plosive/ Affricate	voiceless	geminate	*	pʲː	pʷː	*	tʰː	tʲː	tʷː	tᶣː	*		*	*	kʰː	kʲː	kʷː	kᶣː
Plosive/ Affricate	voiced	plain	bʰ	bʲ	bʷ	bᶣ	dʰ	dʲ	dʷ	dᶣ					gʰ	gʲ	gʷ	gᶣ
Plosive/ Affricate	voiced	geminate	*	*	*	*	*	*	*	*					*	*	*	*
Fricative	voiceless	plain	*	fʲ	*	*	sʰ	sʲ	sʷ	sᶣ	*	ɕ	*	*	xʰ	xʲ	xʷ	xᶣ
Fricative	voiceless	geminate	*	*	*	*	sʰː	sʲː	sʷː	sᶣː	*	ɕː	*	*	*	*	*	*
Fricative	voiced	plain	vʰ	vʲ	vʷ	vᶣ	zʰ	zʲ	zʷ	*	*	*	*	*				
Fricative	voiced	geminate	vʰː	vʲː	*	*	*	zʲː	*	*	*	*	*	*				
Approximant	median	plain					rʰ	rʲ	rʷ	rᶣ	jʰ	*	jʷ	jᶣ				
Approximant	median	geminate					rʰː	rʲː	*	*	*	*	*	*				
Approximant	lateral	plain					lʰ	lʲ	lʷ	lᶣ								
Approximant	lateral	geminate					lʰː	lʲː	lʷː	lᶣː								

Examples of words with these additional consonant sounds are shown below.

Sound pʲ: ennempʲ - earlier, vanempʲ - eldest.
Sound pʲː: krampʲː - hook(hanger).GEN.
Sound pʷ: ampʷ - shoot.IPF.3SG.
Sound pʷː: piipʷː - tube, kirpʷː - flea.
Sound tʰ: pöütʰ (weak aspiration) - table, luutʰ (weak aspiration) - broom.
Sound tʲ: prahtʲ - garbage, lahtʲ - open (adverb), lehtʲ - leaf, sheet, unohtʲ - forget.IPF.3SG.
Sound tʷ: rohtʷ - medicine, maitʷ - milk, lintʷ - bird, tultʷ - come.PAS.PTCP, tahtʷ - want.IPF.3SG, pantʷ - put.PAS.PTCP.
Sound tᶣ: nähtᶣ - to see.PAS.PTCP.SG, pestᶣ - wash.PAS.PTCP.SG.
Sound zʲː: grizʲː - gnaw.IPF.3SG.
Sound ɕ: tovariɕ - comrade.
Sound sᶣː: püsᶣː - gun (rifle).
Sound kʲː: säkʲː - bag (sack), tükʲː - field.
Sound rʲ or rᶣ: höürʲ (höürᶣ) - steam (vapor).
Sound rʰː: kuərʰː - sour cream.

== Grammar ==
=== Pronouns ===
==== Personal pronouns ====
The personal pronouns of Siberian Ingrian Finnish are shown in the table:

Case / Person	1SG	2SG	3SG	1PL	2PL	3PL
Nominative	miə	siə	hä / hän	müə	tüə	hüə
Genetive	miun	siun	hänen	mejjen	tejjen	hejjen
Accusative				mejjet	tejjet	hejjet
Partitive	minnu / mint	sinnu / sint	hänt	meit	teit	heit
Illative	minnu	sinnu	hänt	mejjes	tejjes	hejjes
Inessive	mius	sius	hänes	mejjes	tejjes	hejjes
Elative	miust	siust	hänest	mejjest	tejjest	hejjest
Adessive - Allative	miul	siul	häl / hänel	meil'	teil'	heil' / hejjel'
Ablative	miult	siult	hält / hänelt	mejjel't	tejjel't	hejjel't
Translative	miuks	siuks	häneks	mejjeks	tejjeks	hejjeks
Comitative	miunka	siunka	hänenkä	mejjenkä	tejjenka	hejjenka

Personal pronouns are the only part of speech for which there is an accusative case (plural only).

=== Numerals ===
The names of cardinal numbers 1 to 19:

1	üks	11	ükstojst
2	kaks	12	kakstojst
3	kolt	13	kolttojst
4	neli	14	nelitojst
5	viis	15	viistojst
6	kuus	16	kuustojst
7	seitsen	17	seitsentojst
8	kaheksan	18	kaheksantojst
9	üheksän	19	üheksäntojst
10	kümmen		

The names of cardinal numbers twenty, thirty etc.: number from the first ten + ten.PRT (kümmen-t). For example:

30 - koltkümment
42 - nelikümment kaks

The ordinal numbers:

1. 1st - ensimäjn
2. 2nd - toin
3. 3rd - kolmas
4. 4th - nell'äs
5. 5th - vijjes
6. 6th - kuvves

=== Nouns ===
Nouns in Siberian Ingrian Finnish are inflected by 10 cases and 2 numbers (singular and plural). There are 5 stems for the formation of nouns:

- Main stem (a word in the nominative case, singular);
- Partitive stem singular PRT.SG (for the formation of a word in the partitive case, singular);
- Illative stem singular ILL.SG (for the formation of a word in the illative case, singular);
- Oblique stem singular OBL.SG (for the formation of words in all oblique cases and for the formation of a word in the nominative case, plural);
- Oblique stem plural OBL.PL (for the formation of words in all cases, in plural, except the formation of words in the nominative case, plural).

All possible stems, all possible suffixes and an example of the declension paradigm of the word kukk "flower" are shown in the table below:

	Singular			Plural		
	Stem	Suffix	Example	Stem	Suffix	Example
Nominative	Main stem	∅	kukk	OBL.SG stem	-t	kuka-t
Genetive	OBL.SG stem	-n	kuka-n	OBL.PL stem	-n	kukki-n
Partitive	PRT.SG stem	pure PRT.SG stem, -t, -tt	kukka	OBL.PL stem	-j, -t	kukki-j
Illative	ILL.SG stem	pure ILL.SG stem, -s, -h	kukka	OBL.PL stem	-s	kukki-s
Inessive	OBL.SG stem	-s	kuka-s	OBL.PL stem	-s	kukki-s
Elative	OBL.SG stem	-st	kuka-st	OBL.PL stem	-st	kukki-st
Adessive - Allative	OBL.SG stem	-l, OBL.SG-n pääl	kuka-l, kuka-n pääl	OBL.PL stem	-l	kukki-l
Ablative	OBL.SG stem	-lt, OBL.SG-n päält	kuka-lt, kuka-n päält	OBL.PL stem	-lt	kukki-lt
Translative	OBL.SG stem	-ks	kuka-ks	OBL.PL stem	-ks	kukki-ks
Comitative	OBL.SG stem	-n'ka, -n'kä	kuka-n'ka	OBL.PL stem	-n'ka, -n'kä	kukki-n'ka

The declension paradigm of the word kukk also includes the words: piippᵒ "tube", huntt' "wolf", rankk "heavy", penkk' "bench", harakk "magpie", kant "trunk" etc. Siberian Ingrian Finnish has at least 16 declension paradigms for nouns.

=== Verbs ===
Verbs in Siberian Ingrian Finnish have finite and non-finite forms. Verbs in finite form have the following grammatical categories: mood, tense, person, number, and polarity item. Non-finite verb forms: infinitive, supine, impersonal verbs, and participle.

The example of a verb paradigm is shown in the table:

Haasta To Speak	Stem	Suffix
INF	haasta-	∅
SUP	haast-	-mä
IMPRS.PST	haasse-	-(t)ti
NEG; IMP.2SG	haass-	∅; ∅
IMP.2PL	haasta-	-ke
1SG.PRS; 1PL.PRS; 2SG.PRS; 2PL.PRS	haassa-	-n; -m; -t; -t
1SG.PST; 1PL.PST; 2SG.PST; 2PL.PST	haasso-	-n; -m; -t; -t
3SG.PRS; 3PL.PRS	haasta-	∅; -t
3SG.PST	haastᵒ-	∅
3PL.PST	haasto-	-vät
PAS.PTCP	haasse-	-ttᵒ
ACT.PTCP.SG	haasta-	-(n)t
ACT.PTCP.PL	haastə-	-(n)et

== Sample text ==
A native speaker of Siberian Ingrian Finnish tells a story. Ryzhkovo village, Omsk Oblast, Siberia, 2022.

In the video, an example of speech in Siberian Ingrian Finnish, a woman says that her mother had an old Lutheran liturgical book (she called it "Jumalan kiriə") in Finnish. The book had a sheet with an alphabet and a picture. The picture was of a girl, a dog, and a story. The story was that there was no food and the dog found a piece of bread and gave it to the girl, and that the dog's name was Veikᵒ.

All examples are shown below from Sidorkevich 2014.

Tükk' jäi küntä-mä-tt.
field.NOM.SG leave.PST.NPFV.3SG plow.DEST.ABS
Field left unplowed.

Uks nois' tule-ma laht'.
door.NOM.SG begin.PST.NPFV.3SG come.DEST openly
The door began to open.

Tüttᵒ ono kultsi-n tilduko-nka.
girl.NOM.SG be.PRS.3SG golden.PL-GEN earring.PL-COM
The girl has gold earrings.

Tämä-s külä-s ono pall'ᵒ ihməsti-j.
This.INS village.INS be.PRS.3SG many person.PL-PRT
There are many people in this village.

Tütse-t kene-st siə haassa-t, hüə ellä-t naapri-n tuva-s.
girl.NOM.PL who.ELA 2SG tell.2SG 3PL live.3PL neighbor.GEN house.INS
The girls you're talking about live neighbor house.

Poikse-t kel' ol-ti sukulajse-t linna-s män-ti linna.
boy.NOM.PL who.ADE be.IMP.PST relativ.NOM.PL city.INS go.IMP.PST city.ILL
Boys who had relatives in the city went to the city.

Kui siə ol-isi-t hän-t teh-t'ᵒ vihase-ks hä ol-is siu-n pääl kill'u-ma.
if 2SG be.COND.2SG 3SG.PRT do.PP angry.TRANSL 3SG be.COND.3SG 2SG.GEN at yell.DEST
If you made him angry, he would yell at you.

== Sources ==
- Sidorkevich, Daria (2012). "Ингерманландцы в Сибири: этническая идентичность в многоэтничном окружении". Acta Linguistica Petropolitana (in Russian). 8 (1): 194–285 – via CyberLeninka.
- Sidorkevich, Daria (2014). Язык ингерманландских переселенцев в Сибири: структура, диалектные особенности, контактные явления. Дисс. канд. филол. наук (PhD thesis) (in Russian). Saint Petersburg: The Institute for Linguistic Studies of the Russian Academy of Sciences.
