= Ingrian phonology =

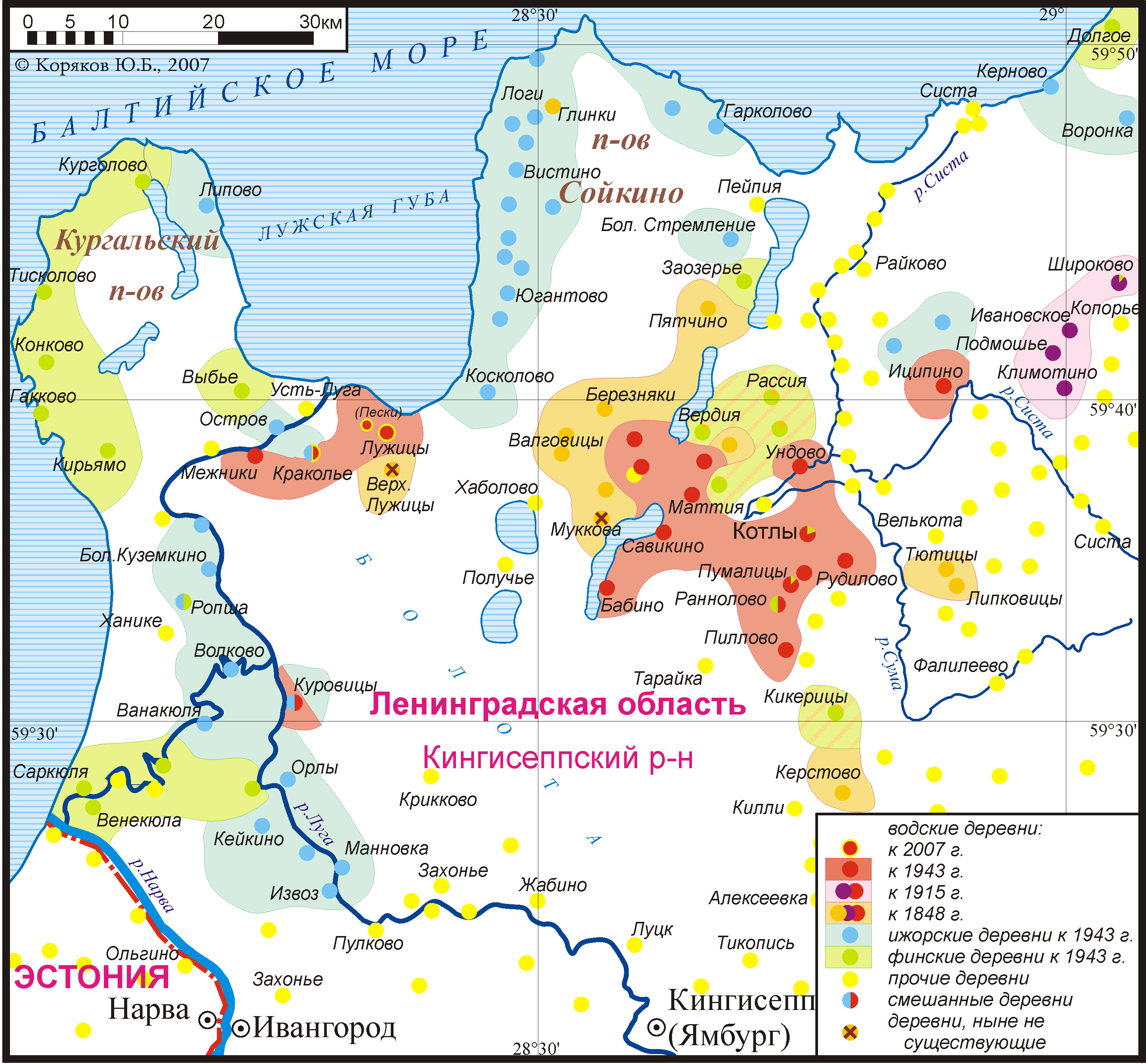
Distribution of the Ingrian language by 2007 (shown in blue).

Ingrian is a nearly extinct Finnic language of Russia. The spoken language remains unstandardised, and as such statements below are about the four known dialects of Ingrian (Ala-Laukaa, Hevaha, Soikkola and Ylä-Laukaa) and in particular the two extant dialects (Ala-Laukaa and Soikkola).

The written forms are, if possible, based on the written language (referred to as kirjakeeli, "book language") introduced by the Ingrian linguist Väinö Junus in the late 1930s. Following 1937's mass repressions in the Soviet Union, the written language was abolished and ever since, Ingrian does not have a (standardised) written language.

== Vowels ==
The following chart shows the monophthongs present in the Ingrian language:

Ingrian vowel phonemes
| | Front | | Central | Back |
| | unrounded | rounded | Central | Back |
|---|---|---|---|---|
| Close | i /i/ | y /y/ | (ь /ɨ/) | u /u/ |
| Mid | e /e/ | ö /ø/ | | o /o/ |
| Open | ä /æ/ | | | a /ɑ/ |

- The vowel /ɨ/ is only present in some Russian loanwords, like rьbakka ("fisher"); this vowel has been replaced by /i/ in some idiolects.
- All vowels can occur as both short (/æ e i ɨ ø y ɑ o u/) and long (/æː eː iː ɨː øː yː ɑː oː uː/). The long vowel /ɨː/ is extremely rare, occurring in borrowed words like rььžoi ("red-haired").
- The vowels /eː øː oː/ are usually realised as diphthongs ([ie̯ yø̯ uo̯]) in the southern varieties of the Ala-Laukaa dialect, as diphthongoids ([i̯eː y̯øː u̯oː]) in many transitional varieties, and as [iː yː uː] in the northernmost Soikkola subdialects.

=== Diphthongs ===
Besides the diphthongs that arise due to diphthongisation of the long mid vowels ([ie̯ yø̯ uo̯]), Ingrian has a wide range of phonemic diphthongs, present in both dialects:

Ingrian diphthongs
| | -i | -u | | -i | -y |
|---|---|---|---|---|---|
| a- | ai /ɑi̯/ | au /ɑu̯/ | ä- | äi /æi̯/ | äy /æy̯/ |
| i- | – | iu /iu̯/ | | | |
| e- | ei /ei̯/ | eu /eu̯/ | | | |
| o- | oi /oi̯/ | ou /ou̯/ | ö- | öi /øi̯/ | öy /øy̯/ |
| u- | ui /ui̯/ | – | y- | yi /yi̯/ | – |

Ingrian has only one falling phonemic diphthong, iä (/iæ̯/), which is only present in the personal pronouns miä ("I") and siä ("you", singular).

=== Vowel reduction ===
Phonemically, Ingrian vowels can be long (/Vː/) and short (/V/) in both dialects. Short vowels after short stressed syllables are realised as half-long:

kana /ˈkɑnɑ/ [ˈkɑnɑˑ]

Vowel reduction is furthermore a common feature in both dialects. In the Soikkola dialect, vowel reduction is restricted to the vowels a and ä; These vowels are sometimes reduced to [ə] in quick speech:

linna /ˈlinːɑ/ [ˈlinːə] ("city")
ilma /ˈilmɑ/ [ˈiɫmə] ("weather")

In Ala-Laukaa, this process is much more common and regular, but varies greatly by speaker. In the northernmost varieties, reduction is similar to that of the Soikkola dialect. In the southernmost idiolects, the following features appear:

1. Long unstressed vowels are shortened to short vowels (/ɑː eː iː oː uː æː øː yː/ to [ɑ e i o u æ ø y] respectively).
2. Unstressed vowel clusters /u.ɑ o.ɑ/ are reduced to [o], /y.æ ø.æ/ to [ø], and /i.ɑ i.æ/ to [e].
3. Unstressed diphthongs generally keep their quality and length. Diphthongs ending in /i̯/ may sometimes lose this glide, although this may be a phonological feature.
4. Short unstressed vowels following a short stressed syllable remain unreduced, and continue to be realised as halflong (/ɑ e i o u æ ø y/ to [ɑˑ eˑ iˑ oˑ uˑ æˑ øˑ yˑ]).
5. Other short unstressed /i o u ø y/ are shortened to [ĭ ŏ ŭ ø̆ y̆], respectively.
  1. When at word-end, these shortened vowels are furthermore pronounced as voiceless: [ĭ̥ ŏ̥ ŭ̥ ø̥̆ y̥̆] respectively.
  2. The voiceless word-final [ĭ̥] may surface as palatalisation of the preceding consonant instead.
6. Other short unstressed /ɑ æ/ are shortened to a schwa ([ə]), and dropped (or, potentially, devoiced to [ə̥]) at word-end.
7. Short unstressed /e/ at word-end is dropped, and is sometimes also reduced to a schwa in polysyllabic words, although this is not as frequent as the reduction of /ɑ/ and /æ/.

Although some vowels merge in the process of reduction, speakers do generally have the knowledge of the original (unreduced) vowel quality.

=== Vowel harmony ===
A diagram illustrating Ingrian vowel groups.

Ingrian, just like its closest relatives Finnish and Karelian, has the concept of vowel harmony. The principle of this morphophonetic phenomenon is that vowels in a word consisting of one root are all either front or back. As such, no native words can have any of the vowels {a, o, u} together with any of the vowels {ä, ö, y}.

To harmonise formed words, any suffix containing one of these six vowels have two separate forms: a front vowel form and a back vowel form. Compare the following two words, formed using the suffix -kas: liivakas ("sandy") from liiva ("sand") and iäkäs ("elderly") from ikä ("age").

The vowels {e, i} are considered neutral and can co-occur with both types of vowels. However, stems with these vowels are always front vowel harmonic: kivekäs ("rocky") from kivi ("rock").

Compound words don't have to abide by the rules of vowel harmony, since they consist of two stems: rantakivi ("coastal stone") from ranta ("coast") + kivi ("stone").

== Consonants ==
The consonantal phonology of Ingrian varies greatly among dialects. For example, while Soikkola Ingrian misses the voiced-unvoiced distinction, it has a three-way consonant length distinction, missing in the Ala-Laukaa dialect.

=== Soikkola dialect ===
Consonant inventory of Soikkola
| | Labial | Dental | Postalveolar/ Palatal | Velar | Glottal |
|---|---|---|---|---|---|
| Plosive | p, b /p/ | t, d /t/ | | k, g /k/ | |
| Nasal | m /m/ | n /n/ | | [ŋ] | |
| Fricative | f /f/ | s, z /s/ | | [x] | h /h/ |
| Lateral | | l /l/ | | | |
| Trill | | r /r/ | | | |
| Affricate | | ts /t͡s/ | c /t͡ʃ/ | | |
| Approximant | v /ʋ/ | | j /j/ | | |

- The velar nasal [ŋ] is a form of /n/ occurring before the plosive /k/ (written ⟨nk⟩).
- The velar fricative [x] is a (half-)long version of /h/ (written ⟨hh⟩).
- Common realisations of /s/ are [ʃ] (in most subdialects) and [s̠] (in some subdialects).
- /t͡ʃ/ is most commonly realised as the palatalised [t͡ɕ]
- /t͡s/ may be realised as the consonant cluster [ts̠].

==== Consonant length ====
In the Soikkola dialect, consonants have a three-way distinction in length. Geminates can be either short (1.5 times the length of a short consonant) or long (twice the length of a short consonant):

tapa /ˈtɑpɑ/ ("manner" NOM)
tappaa /ˈtɑpˑɑː/ ("catch!" also: "manner" PTV)
tappaa /ˈtɑpːɑː/ ("to kill")

A similar phenomenon can be observed in the related Estonian language.

A word with the underlying structure *(C)VCVCV(C) is geminated to (C)VCˑVːCV(C) in the Soikkola dialect:

omena /ˈomˑeːnɑ/ ("apple" NOM; respelled ommeena)
omenan /ˈomˑeːnɑn/ ("apple" GEN; respelled ommeenan)
orava /ˈorˑɑːʋɑ/ ("squirrel" NOM; respelled orraava)

This rule however does not apply to forms that are underlyingly tetrasyllabic:

omenaal (< *omenalla) /ˈomenɑːl/ ("apple" ADE)
omenaks (< *omenaksi) /ˈomenɑːks/ ("apple" TRANSL)

==== Consonant voicing ====
The Soikkola dialect also exhibits a phonetic three-way voicing distinction for plosives and the sibilant:

- Intervocalically, short (ungeminated) consonants, when followed by a short vowel, are generally realised as semi-voiced, so [b̥], [d̥], [ɡ̊] and [ʒ̊] for /p/, /t/, /k/ and /s/ respectively:
  poika /ˈpoi̯kɑ/, [ˈpoi̯ɡ̊ɑ]
  poikaa /ˈpoi̯kɑː/, [ˈpoi̯kɑː]
- When preceding a hiatus, word-final consonants are also semi-voiced. When not, voicing assimilation occurs, resulting in voiced consonants ([b], [d], [ɡ], [ʒ]) before voiced consonants and vowels, and voiceless consonants ([p], [t], [k], [ʃ]) before voiceless consonants:
  pojat /ˈpojɑt/, [ˈpojɑd̥]
  pojat nooret /ˈpojɑt ˈnoːret/, [ˈpojɑd‿ˈnoːred̥]
  pojat suuret /ˈpojɑt ˈsuːret/, [ˈpojɑt‿ˈʃuːred̥]
  pojat ovat /ˈpojɑt ˈoʋɑt/, [ˈpojɑd‿ˈoʋɑd̥]
- Word-initially, plosives and sibilants are generally voiceless. Some speakers, however, may pronounce Russian loanwords, deriving from Russian words with a word-initial voiced plosive, with a voiced initial consonant:
  bocka [ˈpot͡ɕkɑ] ~ [ˈbot͡ɕkɑ]; compare also pocka [ˈpot͡ɕkɑ]

==== Nasal assimilation ====
A word-final dental nasal (/n/) assimilates to the following stop and nasal:

meehen poika [ˈmeːhem‿ˈpoi̯ɡ̊ɑ]
meehen koira [ˈmeːheŋ‿ˈkoi̯rɑ]
kanan muna [ˈkɑnɑm‿ˈmunɑ]

Some speakers also assimilate word-final /n/ to a following liquid, glottal fricative or bilabial approximant:

meehen laps [ˈmeːhel‿lɑps]
joen ranta [ˈjoer‿rɑnd̥a]
miul on vene [ˈmiul oʋ‿ˈʋene]
varis on harmaa [ˈʋɑriz ox‿ˈxɑrmɑː]

=== Ala-Laukaa dialect ===
Consonant inventory of Ala-Laukaa
| | Labial | | Dental | | Postalveolar/ Palatal | | Velar | | Glottal |
|---|---|---|---|---|---|---|---|---|---|
| Plosive | p /p/ | b /b/ | t /t/ | d /d/ | | | k /k/ | g /ɡ/ | |
| Nasal | m /m/ | | n /n/ | | | | /ŋ/ | | |
| Fricative | f /f/ | | s /s/ | z /z/ | š /ʃ/ | ž /ʒ/ | | | h /h/ |
| Lateral | | | l /l/ | | | | | | |
| Trill | | | r /r/ | | | | | | |
| Affricate | | | ts /t͡s/ | | c /t͡ʃ/ | | | | |
| Approximant | v /ʋ/ | | | | j /j/ | | | | |

- The velar nasal /ŋ/ only appears before the plosive /k/ (written ⟨nk⟩) or /ɡ/ (written ⟨ng⟩)
- /t͡s/ may be realised as the consonant cluster [ts].
- /t͡s/ sometimes corresponds to Soikkola /t͡ʃ/ and is thus written ⟨c⟩: compare mancikka (Soikkola [ˈmɑnt͡ʃikːɑ], Ala-Laukaa [ˈmɑnt͡sikːə̥]).

==== Palatalisation ====
In the Ala-Laukaa dialect, phonetic palatalisation of consonants in native words occurs first of all before the vowels {y, i} and the approximant /j/:

tyttö [ˈtʲytːø̥̆] ("girl"); compare Soikkola [ˈtytːøi̯] and Standard Finnish [ˈt̪yt̪ːø̞].

The palatalised /t/ and /k/ may both be realised as [c] by some speakers. Furthermore, palatalisation before /y(ː)/ and /i(ː)/ that have developed from an earlier */ø/ or */e/ respectively is rare:

töö [ˈtøː] ~ [ˈtyø̯] ~ [ˈtyː] ("you (plural)")

The cluster ⟨lj⟩ is realised as a long palatalised consonant in the Ala-Laukaa dialect:

neljä [ˈnelʲː(ə̥)] ("four"); compare Soikkola [ˈneljæ]
paljo [ˈpɑlʲːŏ̥] ("many"); compare Soikkola [ˈpɑljo]
kiljua [ˈkilʲːo] ("to shout"); compare Standard Finnish [ˈkiljuɑ]

These same phenomena are noticed in the extinct Ylä-Laukaa dialect:

tyttö [ˈtʲytːøi̯] ("girl")
neljä [ˈnelʲːæ] ("four")

==== Consonant voicing ====
At the end of a word, the sibilant ⟨s⟩ and the stop ⟨t⟩ are voiced:

lammas [ˈlɑmːəz] ("sheep")
linnut [ˈlinːŭd] ("birds")

Like in the Soikkola dialect, when preceding a word beginning with a voiceless stop, this sibilant is again devoiced:

lammas pellool [ˈlɑmːəs‿ˈpelolː(ə̥)]
linnut kyläs [ˈlinːŭt‿ˈkylæsː(ə̥)]

== Prosody ==
=== Stress ===
Stress in Ingrian falls on the first syllable in native words, but may be shifted in loanwords. An exception is the word paraikaa (/pɑrˈɑi̯kɑː/, "now"), where the stress falls on the second syllable. Secondary stress falls on odd-numbered syllables or occurs as a result of compounding and is not phonemic.
