= Nirvi =

Nirvi is a Finnish surname. Notable people with the surname include:

- Niko Nirvi (born 1961), Finnish journalist
- Ruben Nirvi (1905–1986), Finnish linguist and professor
