= Ingrian Finnish =

Ingrian Finnish may refer to:

- Ingrian Finns, the descendants of Lutheran emigrants from present-day Finland who settled in Ingria in 17th century
- Ingrian Finnish dialects, dialects of Finnish spoken by Ingrian Finns
