= Izhorian =

Izhorian may refer to:

- Izhorian language
- Izhorians
- Izhora (region)
