= Orlovka, Novosibirsk Oblast =

Village in Novosibirsk Oblast, Russia

Coordinates: 54°18′52″N 76°56′03″E

Orlovka or Kolonija (Siberian Finnish: Orunkylä) is a village 140 km east of Omsk in Novosibirsk Oblast, Russia. Orlovka has a large Siberian Finnish minority. The village is inhabited by Estonians, Siberian Finns, Kazakhs and Russians. Orlovka is still a big village that is 2 km wide.
