= Ubykh phonology =

Ubykh, an extinct Northwest Caucasian language, has the largest consonant inventory of all documented languages that do not use clicks, with 84, due to extensive secondary articulation, and also the most disproportionate ratio of consonants to vowels. It has consonants in at least eight, perhaps nine, basic places of articulation and 29 distinct fricatives, 27 sibilants, and 20 uvulars, more than any other documented language. Only Khoisan languages such as Taa have larger consonant inventories due to their large inventories of click consonants.

== Consonants ==
=== Standard Ubykh Phonology ===
Below is an International Phonetic Alphabet representation of the Standard Ubykh consonant inventory.

		Labial		Alveolar			Postalveolar					Palatal	Velar				Uvular					Glottal
		Labial		Alveolar			laminal closed		laminal		apical	Palatal	Velar				Uvular					Glottal
		plain	phar.	plain	lab.	sib.	plain	lab.	plain	lab.	apical	Palatal	pal.	plain	lab.	phar. & lab.	pal.	plain	lab.	phar.	phar. & lab.	Glottal
Plosive/ Affricate	voiceless	p	pˤ	t	tʷ	t͡s	t̠͡ʃ		t͡ɕ	t͡ɕʷ	ʈ͡ʂ		kʲ	k	kʷ		qʲ	q	qʷ	qˤ	qˤʷ	(ʔ)
Plosive/ Affricate	voiced	b	bˤ	d	dʷ	d͡z	d̠͡ʒ		d͡ʑ	d͡ʑʷ	ɖ͡ʐ		ɡʲ	ɡ	ɡʷ							
Plosive/ Affricate	ejective	pʼ	pˤʼ	tʼ	tʷʼ	t͡sʼ	t̠͡ʃʼ		t͡ɕʼ	t͡ɕʷʼ	ʈ͡ʂʼ		kʲʼ	kʼ	kʷʼ		qʲʼ	qʼ	qʷʼ	qˤʼ	qˤʷʼ	
Fricative	voiceless	f		ɬ	(sʷ)	s	ʃ	ʃʷ	ɕ	ɕʷ	ʂ			x	(xʷ)		χʲ	χ	χʷ	χˤ	χˤʷ	h
Fricative	voiced	v	vˤ		(zʷ)	z	ʒ	ʒʷ	ʑ	ʑʷ	ʐ			ɣ			ʁʲ	ʁ	ʁʷ	ʁˤ	ʁˤʷ	
Fricative	ejective			ɬʼ																		
Nasal		m	mˤ	n																		
Approximant				l								j			w	wˤ						
Trill				r																		

1. Ubykh has basic consonants at nine places of articulation.
2. The glottal stop [ʔ] is also noted, but only as an allophone of /qʼ/.
3. The three postalveolar series have traditionally been called "postalveolar", "alveolo-palatal", and "retroflex", respectively, and have been transcribed with their associated symbols.
4. The laminal and apical postalveolar series are more accurately transcribed as /ʃ̻/ and /ʃ̺/, respectively.
5. There is no standard IPA notation for the laminal-closed postalveolar series. They are transcribed ⟨ŝ⟩, ⟨ẑ⟩, ⟨t͡ŝ⟩, etc. by Catford, or sometimes as ⟨ʆ⟩, ⟨ʓ⟩, ⟨t͜ʆ⟩, etc.
6. The velar stops /k/ /ɡ/ /kʼ/ and the labiodental fricative /v/ are only found in Turkish and Circassian loanwords.
7. Out of the labials, the fricatives /v/ /vˤ/ /f/ are labiodental, the others bilabial.
8. [tʷ, dʷ, tʷʼ] were in free variation with [t͡p᫇, d͡b᫇, t͡p᫇ʼ].

All but four of the 84 consonants are found in native vocabulary. The plain velars /k/ /ɡ/ /kʼ/ and the voiced labiodental fricative /v/ are found mainly in loans and onomatopoeia: /ɡaarɡa/ ('crow') from Turkish karga), /kawar/ ('slat, batten') from Laz k'avari 'roofing shingle'), /makʼəf/ ('estate, legacy') from Turkish vakıf), /vər/ ('the sound of glass breaking'). As well, the pharyngealised labial consonants /pˤ/ /pˤʼ/ are almost exclusively noted in words where they are associated with another pharyngealised consonant (for instance, /qˤʼaapˤʼa/ 'handful'), but are occasionally found outside this context (for example, the verb root /tʼaapˤʼ/ 'to explode, to burst'). Finally, /h/ is mainly found in interjections and loans, with /hənda/ ('now') the only real native word to contain the phoneme. The frequency of consonants in Ubykh is quite variable; the phoneme /n/ alone accounts for over 12% of all consonants encountered in connected text, due to the presence of the phoneme in the ergative and oblique singular and plural case suffixes, the third person singular and plural ergative verbal agreement prefix, the adverbial derivative suffix, the present and imperfect tense suffixes, and in suffixes denoting several non-finite verb forms.

Very few allophones of consonants are noted, mainly because a small acoustic difference can be phonemic when so many consonants are involved. However, the alveolopalatal labialised fricatives /ɕʷ ʑʷ/ were sometimes realised as alveolar labialised fricatives [sʷ zʷ], and the uvular ejective stop /qʼ/ was often pronounced as a glottal stop [ʔ] in the past tense suffix -/qʼa/, due to the influence of the Kabardian and Adyghe languages.

The consonant /pˤ/ has not been attested word-initially, and /pˤʼ/ is found initially only in the personal name /pˤʼapˤʼəʒʷ/, but every other consonant can begin a word. Restrictions on word-final consonants have not yet been investigated; however, Ubykh has a slight preference for open syllables (CV) over closed ones (VC or CVC). The pharyngealised consonants /mˤ/ and /wˤ/ have not been noted word-finally, but this is probably a statistical anomaly due to the rarity of these consonants, each being attested only in a handful of words.

The alveolar trill /r/ is not common in native Ubykh vocabulary, appearing mostly in loan words. However, the phoneme carries a phonaesthetic concept of rolling or a repeated action in a few verbs, notably /bəqˤʼəda/ ~ /bəqˤʼərda/ ('to roll around') and /χˤʷəχˤʷəda/ ~ /χˤʷəχˤʷərda/ ('to slither').

=== Karacalar Ubykh Phonology ===
A divergent dialect of Ubykh spoken by Osman Güngör, an inhabitant of Karacalar in the Balıkesir province was investigated by Georges Dumézil in the 1960s. Below is an International Phonetic Alphabet representation of the Karacalar Ubykh consonant inventory.

		Labial			Alveolar		Postalveolar					Palatal	Velar			Uvular					Glottal
		Labial			Alveolar		laminal closed		laminal		apical	Palatal	Velar			Uvular					Glottal
		lenis	fortis	phar.	lenis	sib.	lenis	lab.	lenis	lab.	apical	Palatal	lenis	fortis	lab.	lenis	fortis	lab.	fortis lab.	phar. lab.	Glottal
Plosive/ Affricate	voiceless	p	pː		t	t͡s	t̠͡ʃ		tɕ	tɕʷ	ʈ͡ʂ		k	kː	kʷ	q	qː	qʷ	qʷː	(qˤʷ)	(ʔ)
Plosive/ Affricate	voiced	b	bː	(bˤ)	d	d͡z	d̠͡ʒ		dʑ	dʑʷ	ɖ͡ʐ		ɡ	ɡː	ɡʷ						
Plosive/ Affricate	ejective	pʼ	pʼː		tʼ	t͡sʼ	t̠͡ʃʼ		tɕʼ	tɕʷʼ	ʈ͡ʂʼ		kʼ	kʼː	kʷʼ	qʼ	qʼː	qʷʼ	qʷʼː		
Fricative	voiceless	f			ɬ	s	ʃ	ʃʷ	ɕ		ʂ		x			χ	χː	χʷ	χʷː		h
Fricative	voiced	v	vː			z	ʒ	ʒʷ	ʑ		ʐ					ʁ	ʁː	ʁʷ	ʁʷː		
Fricative	ejective				ɬʼ																
Nasal		m	mː		n																
Approximant					l							j	w	wː							
Trill					r																

Güngör's speech differed phonologically from Standard Ubykh in a number of ways:

- the labialised alveolar stops /dʷ/ /tʷ/ /tʷʼ/ have merged into the corresponding bilabial stops /b/ /p/ /pʼ/.
- The labialised alveolopalatal fricatives /ɕʷ/ /ʑʷ/ have merged with their postalveolar counterparts /ʃʷ/ /ʒʷ/.
- /ɣ/ seems to have disappeared.
- Pharyngealisation is no longer distinctive, surviving only on the lexemes /abˤa/ ('to be ill') and /qˤʷə/ ('to bark'), and being replaced in many instances by gemination (standard /wˤa/ ('dog') → Karacalar /wːa/), and in at least one instance by ejectivisation (standard /tsaqˤapˤə/ ('roasted maize') → Karacalar /tsaqʼapʼə/).
- Palatalisation of the uvular consonants is no longer phonemic, also being replaced in many instances by gemination (standard /qʲa/ ('to cough') → Karacalar /qːa/).
- The voiced retroflex affricate /ɖʐ/ has, at least in some cases, merged with /dʒ/.

== Vowels ==
Ubykh has very few basic phonemic vowels. The analysis in Vogt (1963) retains /oː/ as a separate vowel, but most other linguists do not accept this analysis, preferring one with simpler vertical distinction: /ə/ and /a/. Other vowels, notably /u/, appear in some loanwords. The question of whether an additional vowel /aa/ should be retained is of some debate, since it differs from /a/ not in length but in quality. However, phonologically and diachronically, it is often derived from two instances of /a/.

	Central	Back
Close		(u)
Mid	ə	
Open	a	

Even with so few vowels, there are many vowel allophones, affected by the secondary articulation of the consonants that surround them. Eleven basic phonetic vowels appear, mostly derived from the two phonemic vowels adjacent to labialized or palatalized consonants. The phonetic vowels are [a e i o u ə] and [aː eː iː oː uː]. In general, the following rules apply:

/Cʷa/ → [Co] and /aw/ → [oː]
/Cʲa/ → [Ce] and /aj/ → [eː]
/Cʷə/ → [Cu] and /əw/ → [uː]
/Cʲə/ → [Ci] and /əj/ → [iː]

Other, more complex vowels have been noted as allophones: /ajəwʃqʼa/ ('you did it') can become [ayʃqʼa], for instance. On occasion, nasal sonorants (particularly /n/) may even decay into vowel nasality. For instance, /najnʃʷ/ ('young man') has been noted as [nɛ̃jʃʷ] as well as [najnʃʷ].

The vowel /a/ appears initially very frequently, particularly in the function of the definite article. /ə/ is extremely restricted initially, appearing only in ditransitive verb forms where all three arguments are third person, e.g. /əntʷən/ ('he gave it to him') (normally /jəntʷən/). Even then, /ə/ itself may be dropped to provide an even shorter form /ntʷən/.

Both vowels appear without restriction finally, although when /ə/ is unstressed finally, it tends to be dropped: /tʷə/ ('father') becomes the definite form /atʷ/ ('the father'). In fact, the alternation between /ə/ and zero is often not phonemic, and may be dropped root-internally as well: /maqʷəta/ ~ /maqʷta/ ('hoe'). This kind of allomorphy is called a zero allomorph.

Fenwick (2011) argues that there are three vowels [ɐ ɜ ɨ] which correspond to Dumézil's [aa a ə] respectively and this is evident in the minimal triplet of /ɐsʃɨn/ ('I milk X'), /ɐsʃɜn/ ('I reap X'), and /ɐsʃɐn/ ('I milk them; I reap them').
