= Labio-palatalization =

Type of secondary articulation

Labio-palatalized

◌ᶣ

◌ʲʷ

Encoding
- Entity (decimal): &#7587;
- Unicode (hex): U+1DA3
Image

A labio-palatalized sound is one that is simultaneously labialized and palatalized. Typically the roundedness is compressed, like [y], rather than protruded like [u]. The symbol in the International Phonetic Alphabet for this secondary articulation is ⟨ᶣ⟩, a superscript ⟨ɥ⟩, the symbol for the labialized palatal approximant. If such sounds pattern with other, labialized, consonants, they may instead be transcribed as palatalized consonants plus labialization, ⟨ʷ⟩, as with the [sʲʷ] = [sᶣ] of Abkhaz or the [nʲʷ] = [nᶣ] of Akan and Siberian Ingrian Finnish.

A voiced labialized palatal approximant [ɥ] occurs in Mandarin Chinese and French, but elsewhere is uncommon, as it is generally dependent upon the presence of front rounded vowels such as [ø] and [y], which are themselves not common. However, a labialized palatal approximant and labio-palatalized consonants appear in some languages without front rounded vowels in the Caucasus and in West Africa, such as Abkhaz, and as allophones of labialized consonants before /i/, including the [tsᶣ] at the beginning of the language name Twi. In Russian, /o/ and /u/ trigger labialization of any preceding consonant, including palatalized consonants, so that нёс 'he carried' is phonetically [nᶣɵs].

== Languages with labio-palatalization ==
- Abkhaz
- Akan (Allophonic, result of labialized consonants being palatalized before front vowels)
- Mfumte
- Ndau
- Siberian Ingrian Finnish

== Labial–palatal consonants ==
Truly co-articulated labial–palatal consonants such as [p͡c, b͡ɟ, m͡ɲ] are theoretically possible. They might even be expected as allophones of labial–velar consonants before front vowels. However, the closest sounds attested from the world's languages are the labial–postalveolar consonants of Yélî Dnye in New Guinea, which are sometimes transcribed as labial–palatals.

== List of labio-palatalized consonants ==
type	Phone	IPA	Languages
Stops	labio-pal^{zd} voiceless bilabial stop	[pᶣ]	Siberian Ingrian Finnish
Stops	labio-pal^{zd} voiced bilabial stop	[bᶣ]	Siberian Ingrian Finnish
Stops	labio-pal^{zd} voiceless alveolar stop	[tᶣ]	Ndau, Siberian Ingrian Finnish (may also be geminate)
Stops	labio-pal^{zd} voiced alveolar stop	[dᶣ]	Siberian Ingrian Finnish
Stops	labio-pal^{zd} voiceless velar stop	[kᶣ]	Siberian Ingrian Finnish (may also be geminate), Kukuya
Stops	labio-pal^{zd} voiced velar stop	[ɡᶣ]	Siberian Ingrian Finnish
Affricates	labio-pal^{zd} voiceless alveolo-palatal affricate	[tɕᶣ]	Akan (allophone of /kʷ/ before front vowels), Kukuya
Affricates	labio-pal^{zd} voiced alveolo-palatal affricate	[dʑᶣ]	Akan (allophone of /ɡʷ/ before front vowels), Kukuya (prenasalized)
Fricatives	labio-pal^{zd} voiceless bilabial fricative	[ɸᶣ]	Bahuana
Fricatives	labio-pal^{zd} voiceless labiodental fricative	[fᶣ]	
Fricatives	labio-pal^{zd} voiced labiodental fricative	[vᶣ]	Siberian Ingrian Finnish
Fricatives	labio-pal^{zd} voiceless alveolar sibilant	[sᶣ]	Siberian Ingrian Finnish (may also be geminate)
Fricatives	labio-pal^{zd} voiced alveolar sibilant	[zᶣ]	
Fricatives	labio-pal^{zd} voiceless palato-alveolar fricative	[ʃᶣ]	Abkhaz
Fricatives	labio-pal^{zd} voiced palato-alveolar fricative	[ʒᶣ]	Abkhaz
Fricatives	labio-pal^{zd} voiceless alveolo-palatal fricative	[ɕᶣ]	Akan (allophone of /hʷ/ before front vowels), Kukuya
Fricatives	labio-pal^{zd} voiced alveolo-palatal fricative	[ʑᶣ]	Kukuya
Fricatives	labio-pal^{zd} voiceless velar fricative	[xᶣ]	Siberian Ingrian Finnish
Fricatives	labio-pal^{zd} voiced velar fricative	[ɣᶣ]	Mfumte (prenasalized [ŋɣᶣ])
Fricatives	labio-pal^{zd} voiceless glottal fricative	[hᶣ]	Mfumte (may also be prenasalized)
Nasals	labio-pal^{zd} bilabial nasal	[mᶣ]	Siberian Ingrian Finnish
Nasals	labio-pal^{zd} alveolar nasal	[nᶣ]	Siberian Ingrian Finnish
Nasals	labio-pal^{zd} palatal nasal	[ɲᶣ]	Akan (allophone of /nʷ/ before front vowels; may also be geminate)
Trills	labio-pal^{zd} alveolar trill	[rᶣ]	Ndau
Approximants	labio-pal^{zd} alveolar lateral approximant	[lᶣ]	Siberian Ingrian Finnish (may also be geminate)
Approximants	labio-pal^{zd} alveolar approximant	[ɹᶣ]	Siberian Ingrian Finnish

== See also ==
- Labio-palatal approximant

Place →	Labial					Coronal										Dorsal					Laryngeal			
Manner ↓	Bilabial		Labiodental		Linguolabial		Dental		Alveolar		Postalveolar		Retroflex		(Alveolo-)palatal		Velar		Uvular		Pharyngeal/epiglottal		Glottal	
Nasal	m̥	m	ɱ̊	ɱ		n̼	n̪̊	n̪	n̥	n	n̠̊	n̠	ɳ̊	ɳ	ɲ̊	ɲ	ŋ̊	ŋ	ɴ̥	ɴ				
Plosive	p	b	p̪	b̪	t̼	d̼	t̪	d̪	t	d			ʈ	ɖ	c	ɟ	k	ɡ	q	ɢ	ʡ		ʔ	
Sibilant affricate							t̪s̪	d̪z̪	ts	dz	t̠ʃ	d̠ʒ	tʂ	dʐ	tɕ	dʑ								
Non-sibilant affricate	pɸ	bβ	p̪f	b̪v			t̪θ	d̪ð	tɹ̝̊	dɹ̝	t̠ɹ̠̊˔	d̠ɹ̠˔			cç	ɟʝ	kx	ɡɣ	qχ	ɢʁ	ʡʜ	ʡʢ	ʔh	
Sibilant fricative							s̪	z̪	s	z	ʃ	ʒ	ʂ	ʐ	ɕ	ʑ								
Non-sibilant fricative	ɸ	β	f	v	θ̼	ð̼	θ	ð	θ̠	ð̠	ɹ̠̊˔	ɹ̠˔	ɻ̊˔	ɻ˔	ç	ʝ	x	ɣ	χ	ʁ	ħ	ʕ	h	ɦ
Approximant		β̞		ʋ				ð̞		ɹ		ɹ̠		ɻ		j		ɰ						˷
Tap/flap		ⱱ̟		ⱱ					ɾ̥	ɾ			ɽ̊	ɽ						ɢ̆		ʡ̆		
Trill	ʙ̥	ʙ							r̥	r		r̠	ɽ̊r̥	ɽr					ʀ̥	ʀ	ʜ	ʢ		
Lateral affricate									tɬ	dɮ			tꞎ	d𝼅	c𝼆	ɟʎ̝	k𝼄	ɡʟ̝						
Lateral fricative							ɬ̪		ɬ	ɮ			ꞎ	𝼅	𝼆	ʎ̝	𝼄	ʟ̝						
Lateral approximant								l̪	l̥	l		l̠	ɭ̊	ɭ	ʎ̥	ʎ	ʟ̥	ʟ		ʟ̠				
Lateral tap/flap									ɺ̥	ɺ			𝼈̊	𝼈		ʎ̆		ʟ̆						

		BL	LD	D	A	PA	RF	P	V	U
Implosive	Voiced	ɓ			ɗ		ᶑ	ʄ	ɠ	ʛ
Implosive	Voiceless	ɓ̥			ɗ̥		ᶑ̊	ʄ̊	ɠ̊	ʛ̥
Ejective	Stop	pʼ			tʼ		ʈʼ	cʼ	kʼ	qʼ
Ejective	Affricate		p̪fʼ	t̪θʼ	tsʼ	t̠ʃʼ	tʂʼ	tɕʼ	kxʼ	qχʼ
Ejective	Fricative	ɸʼ	fʼ	θʼ	sʼ	ʃʼ	ʂʼ	ɕʼ	xʼ	χʼ
Ejective	Lateral affricate				tɬʼ			c𝼆ʼ	k𝼄ʼ	q𝼄ʼ
Ejective	Lateral fricative				ɬʼ					
Click (top: velar; bottom: uvular)	Tenuis	kʘ qʘ		kǀ qǀ	kǃ qǃ		k𝼊 q𝼊	kǂ qǂ		
Click (top: velar; bottom: uvular)	Voiced	ɡʘ ɢʘ		ɡǀ ɢǀ	ɡǃ ɢǃ		ɡ𝼊 ɢ𝼊	ɡǂ ɢǂ		
Click (top: velar; bottom: uvular)	Nasal	ŋʘ ɴʘ		ŋǀ ɴǀ	ŋǃ ɴǃ		ŋ𝼊 ɴ𝼊	ŋǂ ɴǂ	ʞ	
Click (top: velar; bottom: uvular)	Tenuis lateral				kǁ qǁ					
Click (top: velar; bottom: uvular)	Voiced lateral				ɡǁ ɢǁ					
Click (top: velar; bottom: uvular)	Nasal lateral				ŋǁ ɴǁ					
