= Siberian Finns =

Descendants of deported (mostly Ingrian) Finns

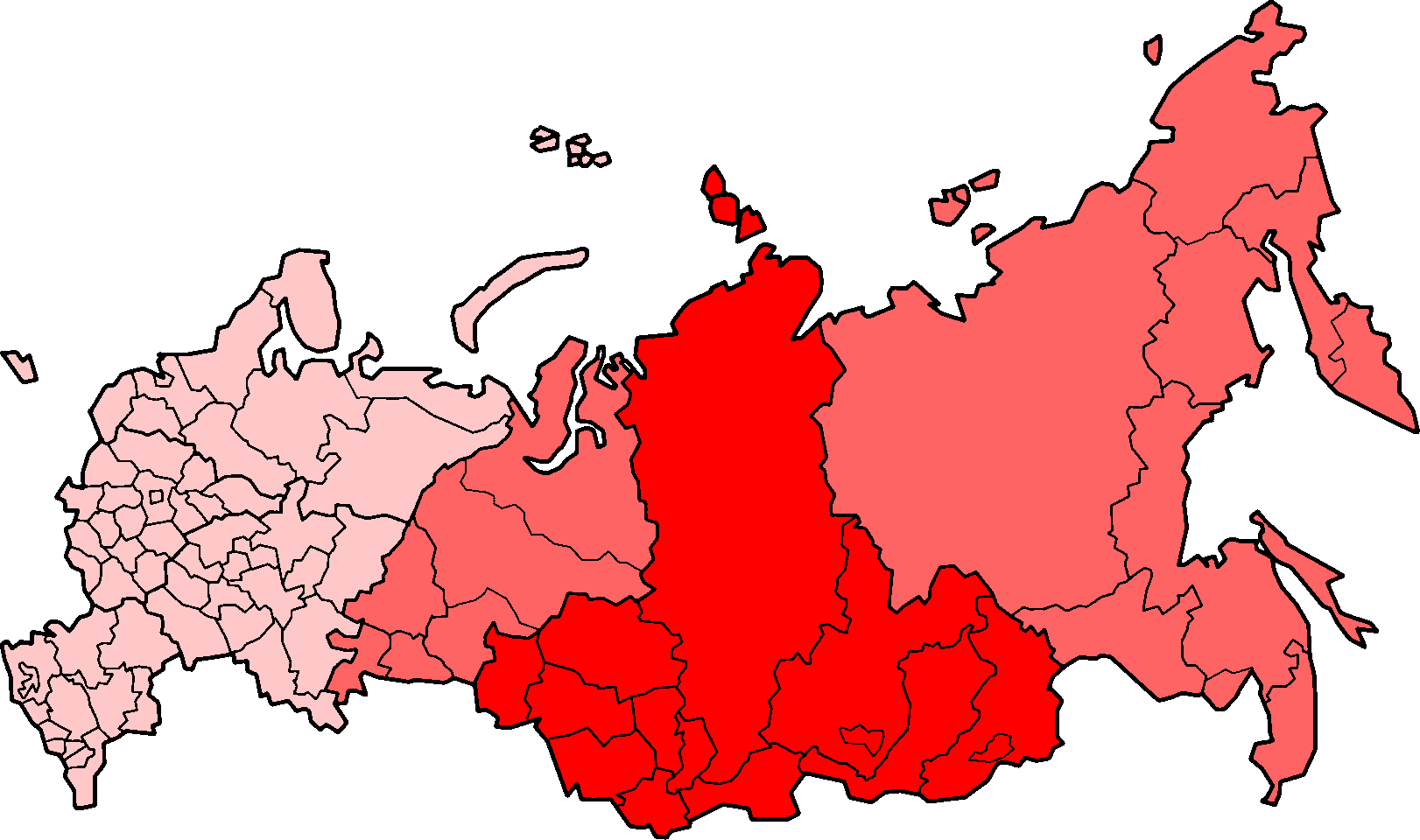
Map of Siberia

Siberian Finns (Finnish: Siperiansuomalaiset, Siberian Finnish: korlakat) are Finnish people living in Siberia, mainly descendants of Ingrian Finns, who were deported into Siberia. According to some estimates up to 30,000 Ingrian Finns were deported to Siberia, a third of whom died either on their way to the various labor camps or soon after arrival. The first Finns in Siberia were a group of serfs who were deported into Siberia in 1803 and formed the village of Ryzhkovo, which still has a Finnish population. Siberian Finns lived close to Izhorians and Estonians. Because the ground was good for farming, and Finns speaking Finnish in their villages, Siberia had become a new home for many Finns, and moving back to Finland was too big of a risk economically to do. Many Siberian Finns have an Estonian passport, because it was better to be Estonian than Finnish in the Soviet Union.

The Siberian Finnish dialect is dying, however it is still spoken, and people still often greet using a Finnish expression "päivää".

== Statistics ==
Between 1826 and 1888, a total of 3,321 Finns were sent into Siberia, of which only 462 were women.

In 1893, Tobolsk had: 1057 Finnish speakers, Tomsk: 136, Sakha: 118, Zabaykalsky Krai: 211 and Irkutsk had 63 Finnish speakers.

== See also ==
- Genocide of the Ingrian Finns
- Siberian Ingrian Finnish
