= Ryzhkovo, Omsk Oblast =

Ryzhkovo Рыжково
- Village
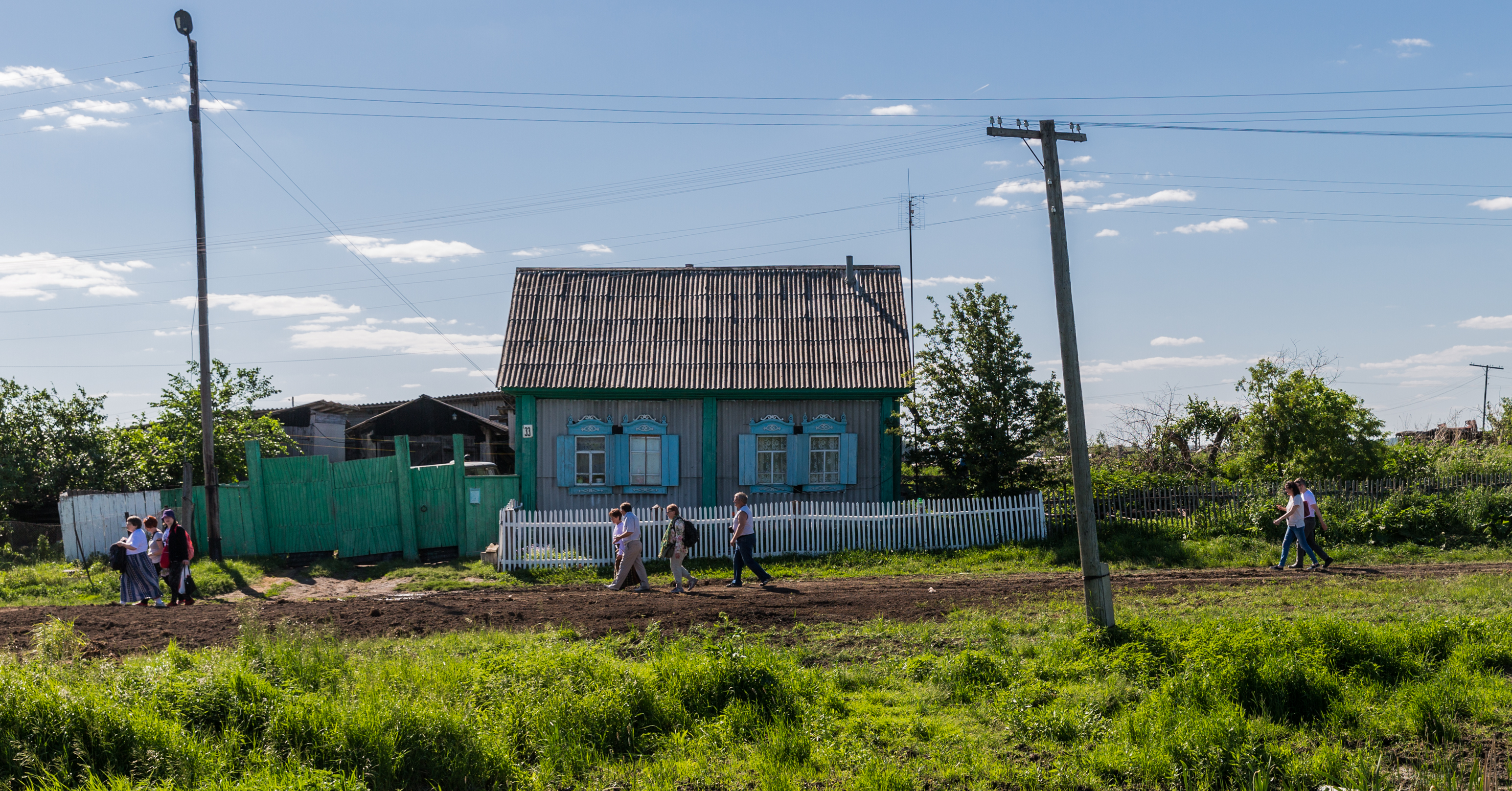
- Ryzhkovo in 2016

- Location within Omsk Oblast Location within Russia
- Coordinates: 55°59′53″N 70°59′54″E
- Country: Russia
- Region: Omsk Oblast
- District: Krutinsky District
- Time zone: UTC+6:00

Ryzhkovo (Russian: Рыжково, Siberian Finnish: Ryžkova, Ryžkovo) is a village in the Krutinsky District of Omsk Oblast in Russia, about 200 km north of Omsk. Ryzhkovo was founded by Siberian Finns in 1805. From 1843 criminals began to be exiled to Ryzhkovo, which caused many people to leave the village. There are still speakers of Siberian Finnish in Ryzhkovo.

In 1859, Ryzhkovo had a population of 1,653 people. Today, around 800 people still live in Ryzhkovo.
