= Anu Korb =

Estonian folklorist (born 1950)

Anu Korb (born on 1950 Kärdla, Hiiu County) is an Estonian folklorist.

Since 1975, she is working as a researcher and archivist at Estonian Literary Museum. 1991–1998, she was the head of the museum's Estonian Folklore Archives.

Her main field of research has been the history of the Estonian Folklore Archives, theory of folkloristic fieldwork, and Estonian diaspora (especially Siberian Estonians).

In 2021, she was awarded with Order of the White Star, V class.

== Publications ==
- monograph "Estonian Settlements in Siberia" (1995-1999)
