= Palatalization (phonetics) =

Phonetic feature

Palatalized

◌ʲ
- IPA number: 421

Encoding
- Entity (decimal): &#690;
- Unicode (hex): U+02B2
Image

In phonetics, palatalization (/ˌpælətəlaɪˈzeɪʃən/, US also /-lɪ-/) or palatization is a way of pronouncing a consonant in which part of the tongue is moved close to the hard palate. Consonants pronounced this way are said to be palatalized and are transcribed in the International Phonetic Alphabet by affixing a superscript j, ⟨ʲ⟩, to the base letter.

Palatalization is prevalent in Slavic languages such as Russian and Bulgarian; Uralic languages such as Estonian, Karelian, Veps, Enets and Mansi; Northwest Caucasian languages such as Abkhaz; and other various languages such as Irish, Lithuanian, Marshallese and Kashmiri. In the Anglosphere, palatalization is frequently associated with Eastern-European accents, due in part to depictions within popular media.

Palatalization is not phonemic in English. A similar approximation can be found in the distinction between such words as "coot" (/kuːt/) and "cute" (/kjuːt/), though the latter treats the /k/ and /j/ as two separate phonemes, whereas palatalization would involve articulating them simultaneously to form a single phoneme ([kʲ]).

== Types ==
In technical terms, palatalization refers to the secondary articulation of consonants by which the middle (dorsum) of the tongue is raised toward the hard palate during the articulation of the consonant. Such consonants are phonetically palatalized. Palatalization may produce a laminal articulation of otherwise apical consonants, such as [t̺] and [s̺] vs palatalized [t̻ʲ] and [s̻ʲ]. In general, palatalization of non-dorsal consonants involves a secondary closure of the oral cavity, with the dorsum of the tongue approaching the hard palate in addition to the primary articulation elsewhere. This is clearly the case with labial consonants such as [pʲ] and [fʲ]. However, in dorsal consonants such as [kʲ] and [xʲ], the tongue can only make a single closure in those two regions, which generally means that the contact is spread over a broader area, from the soft to hard palates, compared to the narrower contact of non-palatalized [k] and [x]; it's not uncommon therefore to transcribe the palatalized sounds simply as palatal [c] and [ç]. Palatalized coronal consonants such as [t̻ʲ] and [n̻ʲ] are somewhere in between: although there may be two places of articulation, the tongue tends to be quite flattened, and moves as if it were a single articulation. In Russian the blade of the tongue remains on the alveolar ridge while the entire front of the tongue is raised, while in Polish the primary articulation (the blade of the tongue) is shifted back toward the palate: [t̠ʲ], [n̠ʲ].

Phonetically palatalized consonants may vary in their exact realization. Some languages add semivowels before or after the palatalized consonant (onglides or offglides). In such cases, the vowel (especially a non-front vowel) following a palatalized consonant typically has a palatal onglide. In Russian, both plain and palatalized consonant phonemes are found in words like большой [bɐlʲˈʂoj], царь [tsarʲ] and Катя [ˈkatʲə]. In Hupa, on the other hand, the palatalization is heard as both an onglide and an offglide. In some cases, the realization of palatalization may change without any corresponding phonemic change. For example, according to Thurneysen, palatalized consonants at the end of a syllable in Old Irish had a corresponding onglide (reflected as ⟨i⟩ in the spelling), which was no longer present in Middle Irish (based on explicit testimony of grammarians of the time).

In a few languages, including Skolt Sami and many of the Central Chadic languages, palatalization is a suprasegmental feature that affects the pronunciation of an entire syllable, and it may cause certain vowels to be pronounced more front and consonants to be slightly palatalized. In Skolt Sami and its relatives (Kildin Sami and Ter Sami), suprasegmental palatalization contrasts with segmental palatal articulation (palatal consonants).

== Transcription ==
In the International Phonetic Alphabet (IPA), palatalized consonants are marked by the modifier letter ⟨ʲ⟩, a superscript version of the symbol for the palatal approximant ⟨j⟩. For instance, ⟨tʲ⟩ represents the palatalized form of the voiceless alveolar stop [t]. Prior to 1989, a subscript diacritic was used in the IPA: ⟨ᶀ ᶈ ᶆ ᶂ ᶌ ƫ ᶁ ᶇ ᶊ ᶎ ᶅ 𝼓 ᶉ 𝼖 𝼕 ᶄ ᶃ 𝼔 ᶍ ꞕ⟩, apart from two palatalized fricatives which were written instead with curly-tailed variants, namely ⟨ʆ⟩ for [ʃʲ] and ⟨ʓ⟩ for [ʒʲ]. (See palatal hook.) The Uralic Phonetic Alphabet marks palatalized consonants by an acute accent, as do the orthographies of some Finnic languages using Latin-based alphabets, as in Võro ⟨ś⟩. Other orthographies use an apostrophe, as in Karelian ⟨sʼ⟩, or digraphs with j, as in the Savonian dialects of Finnish, ⟨sj⟩.

== Phonology ==
Palatalization has varying phonological significance in different languages. It is allophonic in English, but phonemic in others. In English, consonants are palatalized when they occur before front vowels or the palatal approximant (and in a few other cases), but no words are distinguished by palatalization (complementary distribution), whereas in some of the other languages, the difference between palatalized consonants and plain unpalatalized consonants distinguishes between words, appearing in a contrastive distribution (where one of the two versions, palatalized or not, appears in the same environment as the other).

=== Allophonic palatalization ===
In some languages, like Hindustani, palatalization is allophonic. Some phonemes have palatalized allophones in certain contexts, typically before front vowels and unpalatalized allophones elsewhere. Because it is allophonic, palatalization of this type does not distinguish words and often goes unnoticed by native speakers. Phonetic palatalization occurs in American English. Stops are palatalized before the front vowel /i/ and not palatalized in other cases.

=== Phonemic palatalization ===
In some languages, palatalization is a distinctive feature that distinguishes two consonant phonemes. This feature occurs in Russian, Irish, and Scottish Gaelic, among others.

Phonemic palatalization may be contrasted with either plain or velarized articulation. In many of the Slavic languages, and some of the Baltic and Finnic languages, palatalized consonants contrast with plain consonants, but in Irish they contrast with velarized consonants.

- Russian нос /nos/ "nose" (unpalatalized /n/)

нёс /nʲos/ [nʲɵs] "(he) carried" (palatalized /nʲ/)

- Irish bó /bˠoː/ "cow" (velarized b)

beo /bʲoː/ "alive" (palatalized b)

Some palatalized phonemes undergo change beyond phonetic palatalization. For instance, the unpalatalized sibilant (Irish /sˠ/, Scottish /s̪/) has a palatalized counterpart that is actually postalveolar [ʃ], not phonetically palatalized [sʲ], and the velar fricative /x/ in both languages has a palatalized counterpart that is actually palatal [ç] rather than palatalized velar [xʲ]. These shifts in primary place of articulation are examples of the sound change of palatalization.

=== Morphophonemic ===
Romanian ban, bani ("coin, coins")
[ban banʲ]

In some languages, palatalization is used as a morpheme or part of a morpheme. In some cases, a vowel caused a consonant to become palatalized, and then this vowel was lost by elision. Here, there appears to be a phonemic contrast when analysis of the deep structure shows it to be allophonic.

In Romanian, consonants are palatalized before /i/. Palatalized consonants appear at the end of the word, and mark the plural in nouns and adjectives, and the second person singular in verbs. On the surface, it would appear then that ban [ban] "coin" forms a minimal pair with bani [banʲ]. The interpretation commonly taken, however, is that an underlying morpheme |-i| palatalizes the consonant and is subsequently deleted.

Palatalization may also occur as a morphological feature. For example, although Russian makes phonemic contrasts between palatalized and unpalatalized consonants, alternations across morpheme boundaries are normal:

- ответ [ɐˈtvʲet] ('answer') vs. ответить [ɐˈtvʲetʲɪtʲ] ('to answer')
- несу [nʲɪˈsu] ('[I] carry') vs. несёт [nʲɪˈsʲɵt] ('carries')
- голод [ˈɡolət] ('hunger') vs. голоден [ˈɡolədʲɪn] ('hungry' masc.)

== Sound changes ==
In some languages, allophonic palatalization developed into phonemic palatalization by phonemic split. In other languages, phonemes that were originally phonetically palatalized changed further: palatal secondary place of articulation developed into changes in manner of articulation or primary place of articulation.

Phonetic palatalization of a consonant sometimes causes surrounding vowels to change by coarticulation or assimilation. In Russian, "soft" (palatalized) consonants are usually followed by vowels that are relatively more front (that is, closer to [i] or [y]), and vowels following "hard" (unpalatalized) consonants are further back. See Russian phonology § Allophony for more information.

== Examples ==
=== Slavic languages ===
In many Slavic languages, palatal or palatalized consonants are called soft, and others are called hard. Some of them, like Russian, have numerous pairs of palatalized (soft) and unpalatalized (hard) consonant phonemes.

Russian Cyrillic has pairs of vowel letters that mark whether the consonant preceding them is hard/soft: ⟨а⟩/⟨я⟩, ⟨э⟩/⟨е⟩, ⟨ы⟩/⟨и⟩, ⟨о⟩/⟨ё⟩, and ⟨у⟩/⟨ю⟩. The otherwise silent soft sign ⟨ь⟩ also indicates that the previous consonant is soft.

=== Goidelic ===
Irish and Scottish Gaelic have pairs of palatalized (slender) and unpalatalized (broad) consonant phonemes. In Irish, most broad consonants are velarized. In Scottish Gaelic, the only velarized consonants are [n̪ˠ] and [l̪ˠ]; [r] is sometimes described as velarized as well.

=== Marshallese ===
In the Marshallese language, each consonant has some type of secondary articulation (palatalization, velarization, or labiovelarization). The palatalized consonants are regarded as "light", and the velarized and rounded consonants are regarded as "heavy", with the rounded consonants being both velarized and labialized.

=== Norwegian ===
Many Norwegian dialects have phonemic palatalized consonants. In many parts of Northern Norway and many areas of Møre og Romsdal, for example, the words /hɑnː/ ('hand') and /hɑnʲː/ ('he') are differentiated only by the palatalization of the final consonant. Palatalization is generally realised only on stressed syllables, but speakers of the Sør-Trøndelag dialects will generally palatalize the coda of a determined plural as well: e.g. /hunʲː.ɑnʲ/ or, in other areas, /hʉnʲː.ɑn/ ('the dogs'), rather than */hunʲː.ɑn/. Norwegian dialects utilizing palatalization will generally palatalize /d/, /l/, /n/ and /t/.

=== Malayalam ===
Malayalam uses palatalization/velarization to distinguish some of its coronals, /n, t, ɾ, l, ɻ/ are palatalized and have an advanced tongue root while /n̪, r, ɭ/ are clear or velarized and have a retracted tongue root, particularly noticeable in geminates. /ɾ/ and /r/ can vary between ⟦ɹ̟ʲ ~ ɾ̟ʲ ~ r̟ʲ⟧ and ⟦ɾ̠ˠ ~ r̠ˠ⟧, respectively.

== List of palatalized consonants ==
All places and manners of pulmonic consonants are attested with palatalization, with the possible exception of the epiglottals. Palatalized ejectives also occur. A palatalized click ⟨mqya⟩ [m̩ǃʲa] is provided for by the Mwangwego script for Malawian Ngoni.

The list below does not include palatalized post-alveolar sonorants. For those, see palatal consonant.

type	Phone	IPA	Languages
Stops	pal^{zd} voiceless bilabial stop	[pʲ]	Russian, Ukrainian, Irish, Võro, Kashmiri (may also be aspirated), Siberian Ingrian Finnish (may also be labio-palatalized; may be geminate), Forest Nenets, Kildin Sámi (may also be preaspirated or geminate)
Stops	pal^{zd} voiced bilabial stop	[bʲ]	Russian, Ukrainian, Irish, Kashmiri, Siberian Ingrian Finnish (may also be labio-palatalized), Kildin Sámi (may also be geminate)
Stops	pal^{zd} voiceless dental stop	[t̪ʲ]	Kashmiri (may also be aspirated; contrasts with retroflex)
Stops	pal^{zd} voiced dental stop	[d̪ʲ]	Ukrainian, Kashmiri (contrasts with retroflex), Soga (contrasts with alveolar)
Stops	pal^{zd} voiceless alveolar stop	[tʲ]	Russian, Ukrainian, Irish, Võro, Chʼol, Siberian Ingrian Finnish (may also be labio-palatalized; may be geminate), Moksha, Forest Nenets, Kildin Sámi (may also be preaspirated or geminate), Soga
Stops	pal^{zd} voiced alveolar stop	[dʲ]	Russian, Irish, Siberian Ingrian Finnish (may also be labio-palatalized), Moksha, Kildin Sámi (may also be geminate), Soga (contrasts with dental)
Stops	pal^{zd} voiceless retroflex stop	[ʈʲ]	Kashmiri (may also be aspirated)
Stops	pal^{zd} voiced retroflex stop	[ɖʲ]	Kashmiri
Stops	pal^{zd} voiceless velar stop	[kʲ]	Russian, Võro, Kashmiri (may also be aspirated), Tsakhur, Abaza, Ubykh, Siberian Ingrian Finnish (may also be labio-palatalized; may be geminate), Forest Nenets, Kildin Sámi (may also be preaspirated or geminate), Japanese
Stops	pal^{zd} voiced velar stop	[ɡʲ]	Russian, Kashmiri, Tsakhur, Abaza, Ubykh, Siberian Ingrian Finnish (may also be labio-palatalized), Kildin Sámi (may also be geminate)
Stops	pal^{zd} voiceless labial–velar stop	[k͜pʲ]	Anufo (allophone before front vowels)
Stops	pal^{zd} voiced labial–velar stop	[ɡ͡bʲ]	Anufo (allophone before front vowels)
Stops	pal^{zd} voiceless uvular stop	[qʲ]	Ubykh
Stops	pal^{zd} glottal stop	[ʔʲ]	Abzakh Adyghe
Affricates	pal^{zd} voiceless alveolar affricate	[tsʲ]	Russian (dental), Ukrainian (dental), Võro, Kashmiri (may also be aspirated), Tsakhur, Moksha, Kildin Sámi (may also be preaspirated or geminate)
Affricates	pal^{zd} voiced alveolar affricate	[dzʲ]	Ukrainian (dental), Kashmiri, Kildin Sámi (may also be geminate)
Affricates	pal^{zd} voiceless alveolar lateral affricate	[tɬʲ]	
Affricates	pal^{zd} voiceless palato-alveolar affricate	[tʃʲ]	Kildin Sámi (may also be preaspirated or geminate), North Teke (prenasalized [ntʃʲ]).
Affricates	pal^{zd} voiced palato-alveolar affricate	[dʒʲ]	Kildin Sámi (may also be geminate)
Fricatives	pal^{zd} voiceless bilabial fricative	[ɸʲ]	Irish (conservative dialects), Páez
Fricatives	pal^{zd} voiced bilabial fricative	[βʲ]	Irish (conservative dialects), Páez, Soga
Fricatives	pal^{zd} voiceless labiodental fricative	[fʲ]	Russian, Irish, Võro, Siberian Ingrian Finnish, Kildin Sámi (may also be geminate)
Fricatives	pal^{zd} voiced labiodental fricative	[vʲ]	Russian, Irish, Võro, Siberian Ingrian Finnish (may also be labio-palatalized; may be geminate), Kildin Sámi (may also be geminate)
Fricatives	pal^{zd} voiceless dental fricative	[θʲ]	Pukapukan
Fricatives	pal^{zd} voiced dental fricative	[ðʲ]	Scottish Gaelic (Outer Hebrides)
Fricatives	pal^{zd} voiceless alveolar sibilant	[sʲ]	Russian (dental), Ukrainian (dental), Võro, Kashmiri, Tsakhur, Siberian Ingrian Finnish (may also be labio-palatalized; may be geminate), Moksha, Forest Nenets, Kildin Sámi (may also be geminate)
Fricatives	pal^{zd} voiced alveolar sibilant	[zʲ]	Russian (dental), Ukrainian (dental), Kashmiri, Tsakhur, Siberian Ingrian Finnish (may also be geminate), Moksha, Kildin Sámi
Fricatives	pal^{zd} voiceless alveolar lateral fricative	[ɬʲ]	Surgut Khanty, Forest Nenets, Quechan
Fricatives	pal^{zd} voiceless palato-alveolar sibilant	[ʃʲ]	Kildin Sámi (may also be geminate)
Fricatives	pal^{zd} voiced palato-alveolar sibilant	[ʒʲ]	Kildin Sámi
Fricatives	pal^{zd} voiceless velar fricative	[xʲ]	Russian, Tsakhur, Forest Nenets, Kildin Sámi (may also be geminate), Siberian Ingrian Finnish (may also be labio-palatalized)
Fricatives	pal^{zd} voiced velar fricative	[ɣʲ]	Russian, Lithuanian
Fricatives	pal^{zd} voiceless uvular fricative	[χʲ]	Abaza, Ubykh
Fricatives	pal^{zd} voiced uvular fricative	[ʁʲ]	Abaza, Ubykh
Fricatives	pal^{zd} voiceless glottal fricative	[hʲ]	Võro, Kashmiri
Nasals	pal^{zd} bilabial nasal	[mʲ]	Russian, Ukrainian, Irish, Võro, Kashmiri, Siberian Ingrian Finnish (may also be labio-palatalized; may be geminate), Forest Nenets, Kildin Sámi (may also be geminate), Soga
Nasals	pal^{zd} voiceless bilabial nasal	[m̥ʲ]	Kildin Sámi (may also be geminate)
Nasals	prenasal	[ᵐbʲ]	Páez, Soga (marginal)
Nasals	prenasal	[ᵐpʲ]	Soga
Nasals	pal^{zd} dental nasal	[n̪ʲ]	Ukrainian, Kashmiri [confirm it is dental], Siberian Ingrian Finnish (may also be labio-palatalized; may be geminate), Soga (contrasts with alveolar)
Nasals	prenasal	[ⁿd̪ʲ]	Soga (contrasts with alveolar)
Nasals	pal^{zd} alveolar nasal	[nʲ]	Russian, Irish, Võro, Moksha, Forest Nenets, Kildin Sámi (may also be geminate; contrasts with palatal), Soga (contrasts with dental)
Nasals	pal^{zd} voiceless alveolar nasal	[n̥ʲ]	Kildin Sámi (may also be geminate)
Nasals	prenasal	[ⁿdʲ]	Páez, Soga (contrasts with dental)
Nasals	prenasal	[ⁿtʲ]	Soga
Nasals	pal^{zd} velar nasal	[ŋʲ]	Võro, Forest Nenets, Kildin Sámi (may also be geminate)
Nasals	prenasal	[ᵑɡʲ]	Páez
Nasals	pal^{zd} labial–velar nasal	[ŋ͡mʲ]	Anufo (allophone before front vowels)
Taps/flaps	pal^{zd} dental tap	[ɾ̪ʲ]	
Taps/flaps	pal^{zd} alveolar tap	[ɾʲ]	Irish, Malayalam
Taps/flaps	pal^{zd} alveolar lateral flap	[ɺʲ]	Páez, Ilgar, Soga
Taps/flaps	pal^{zd} retroflex flap	[ɽʲ]	possibly Tumbuka
Trills	pal^{zd} dental trill	[r̪ʲ]	Russian
Trills	pal^{zd} alveolar trill	[rʲ]	Ukrainian, Võro, Kashmiri, Moksha, Kildin Sámi (may also be geminate)
Trills	pal^{zd} voiceless alveolar trill	[r̥ʲ]	Moksha, Kildin Sámi (may also be geminate)
Trills	pal^{zd} uvular trill	[ʀʲ]	
Approximants	pal^{zd} bilabial approximant	[β̞ʲ]	Turkish (allophone of /v/)
Approximants	pal^{zd} labiodental approximant	[ʋʲ]	Ukrainian, Kashmiri [confirm place; may be bilabial or [wʲ].]
Approximants	pal^{zd} dental lateral approximant	[l̪ʲ]	Kashmiri [confirm it is dental], Tsakhur
Approximants	pal^{zd} alveolar lateral approximant	[lʲ]	Russian (dental or alveolar), Ukrainian, Irish, Võro, Siberian Ingrian Finnish (may also be labio-palatalized; may be geminate), Moksha, Forest Nenets, Kildin Sámi (may also be geminate; contrasts with palatal)
Approximants	pal^{zd} voiceless alveolar lateral approximant	[l̥ʲ]	Moksha, Kildin Sámi (may also be geminate)
Approximants	pal^{zd} alveolar approximant	[ɹʲ]	Siberian Ingrian Finnish (may also be labio-palatalized; may be geminate)
Approximants	pal^{zd} retroflex approximant	[ɻʲ]	Malayalam
Ejectives	pal^{zd} alveolar ejective	[tʲʼ]	Chʼol
Ejectives	pal^{zd} alveolar ejective affricate	[tsʲʼ]	Tsakhur
Ejectives	pal^{zd} velar ejective	[kʲʼ]	Tsakhur, Abaza, Ubykh
Ejectives	pal^{zd} uvular ejective	[qʲʼ]	Ubykh
Ejectives	pal^{zd} uvular ejective affricate	[qχʲʼ]	Abaza

[wʲ] is claimed for Forest Nenets; this is most likely [ɥ]. Some reported palatalized velars may actually be pre-velar or even palatal, rather than phonetically palatalized.

Any difference between e.g. [ʃʲ] and [ɕ] or [ʔʲ] and [jˀ] may be as much analysis as phonetics.

== See also ==
- Iotation, a related process in Slavic languages
- Manner of articulation
- Labialization
- Labio-palatalization
- List of phonetics topics
- Palatal hook
- Palatalization in the Romance languages
- Soft sign, a Cyrillic grapheme indicating palatalization
- Yōon

== Bibliography ==
- Bynon, Theodora. Historical Linguistics. Cambridge University Press, 1977. ISBN 0-521-21582-X (hardback) or ISBN 978-0-521-29188-0 (paperback).
- Bhat, D.N.S. (1978), "A General Study of Palatalization", Universals of Human Language, 2: 47–92
- Namboodiripad, Savithry (2016), Malayalam (Namboodiri Dialect), Cambridge University Press, archived from the original on 2 March 2022
- Buckley, E. (2003), "The Phonetic Origin and Phonological Extension of Gallo-Roman Palatalization", Proceedings of the North American Phonology Conferences 1 and 2, CiteSeerX 10.1.1.81.4003
- Chițoran, Ioana (2001), The Phonology of Romanian: A Constraint-based Approach, Berlin & New York: Mouton de Gruyter, ISBN 3-11-016766-2
- Crowley, Terry. (1997) An Introduction to Historical Linguistics. 3rd edition. Oxford University Press.
- Lightner, Theodore M. (1972), Problems in the Theory of Phonology, I: Russian phonology and Turkish phonology, Edmonton: Linguistic Research, inc
- Pullum, Geoffrey K.; Ladusaw, William A. (1996). Phonetic Symbol Guide. University of Chicago Press.
