= Ingrian Finnish dialects =

Group of dialects of Finnish

Ingrian Finnish
- Native to: Russia
- Region: Ingria
- Ethnicity: 20,300 Ingrian Finns (2010)
- Native speakers: A few older people (2015)
- Language family: Uralic: Finnic; Finnish; East Finnish; South Karelian dialects; Ingrian Finnish
- Dialects: Siberian Ingrian Finnish
- Writing system: Latin

Language codes
- ISO 639-3: –
- Glottolog: None
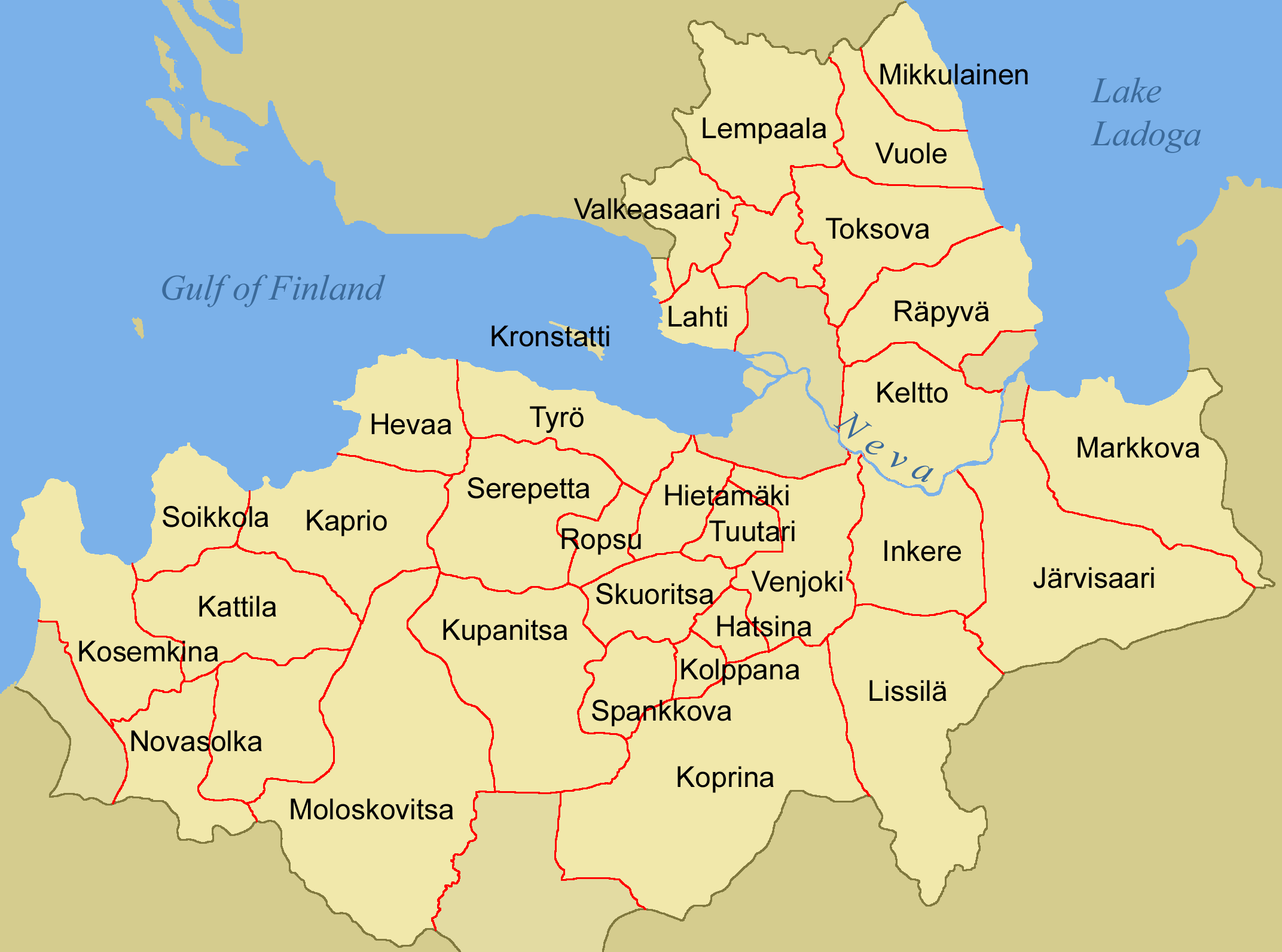
- Map of Ingria, where the dialect is spoken

Ingrian Finnish dialects (Finnish: Inkerin suomalaismurteet) are the Finnish dialects spoken by Ingrian Finns around Ingria in Russia. Today, the Ingrian dialects are still spoken in Russia, Finland and Sweden. In 2010 there were only 20 300 Ingrian Finns left in Russia. The Ingrian dialects are gradually dying out, as primarily elderly people speak them still, and unlike Standard Finnish, the dialects are not taught in schools.

== History ==
After Sweden annexed Ingria in 1617, many people moved to Ingria from Finland, at the time part of Sweden. After Russia annexed it again in 1721, many Russians moved in. However the Finnish language stayed because of the Lutheran church; the difference of religion made mixed marriages rare.

In 1900 the situation changed a lot. At first, minority languages were supported; however, around 1930 Finnish was banned and the Ingrian Finns were subjected to mass deportations and executions. Because of this, language communities broke and Russian influence became larger.

== Phonology ==
The phonology of Ingrian Finnish is very much alike that of the neighbouring Ingrian and Votic languages.

One process present in the dialects is the deletion of final front vowels and their replacement by palatisation, much like in Ala-Laukaa Ingrian and Votic:

äitj ([æi̯tʲ], "mother") for Standard Finnish äiti ([ˈæi̯ti])
vesj ([ʋes̠ʲ], "water") for Standard Finnish vesi ([ˈʋes̠i])
mäkj ([mækʲ], "hill") for Standard Finnish mäki ([ˈmæki])
kylj ([kylʲ], "village") for Standard Finnish kylä ([ˈkylæ])

Another is the diphthongisation of historically long vowels in initial syllables, much like in the Karelian language:

piä ([piæ̯], "head") for Standard Finnish pää ([pæː])
kualj ([kuɑ̯lʲ], "cabbage") for Standard Finnish kaali ([ˈkɑːli])

Like in the Ingrian language, Standard Finnish morphological -d- is often replaced by -v-, -vv- and -ij-:

sovan ([ˈs̠oʋɑn], "war", gen) for Standard Finnish sodan ([ˈs̠od̪ɑn]
pöyvvän ([ˈpøy̯ʋːæn], "table", gen) for Standard Finnish pöydän ([pøy̯d̪æn])

Finally, a shift of the diphthongs [ie̯], [uo̯] and [yø̯] to [iɑ̯] ([iæ̯] in front-vocalic stems), [uɑ̯] and [yæ̯] respectively is present:

piänj ([piæ̯nʲ], "small") for the Standard Finnish pieni ([pie̯ni]).

== Grammar ==
The dialects' personal pronouns differ significantly from the standard language. Follows a comparison with the Karelian language and Standard Finnish:

Ingrian Finnish
	Singular	Plural
First Person	mie	myö
Second Person	sie	työ
Third Person	hiä	hyö

Karelian
	Singular	Plural
First Person	mie	myö
Second Person	sie	työ
Third Person	hiän	hyö

Standard Finnish
	Singular	Plural
First Person	minä	me
Second Person	sinä	te
Third Person	hän	he

== Vocabulary ==
Historically, multiple Swedish loanwords have appeared in Ingrian Finnish. Furthermore, the dialects have borrowed extensively from the neighbouring Finnic languages. In more recent years, it has also borrowed extensively from the Russian language:

latjjat ([ˈlɑtʲjɑt̪], "dress") from Russian платье (plat'je)
liäppä ([ˈliæ̯pːæ], "hat") from Russian шляпа (šljapa)

== Sample text ==
Follows a sample text in Ingrian Finnish:

Ingrian Finnish	IPA	UPA	Standard Finnish	Translation
Oli yks mies elläi Mäni metsää hulkkumaa Ja öksy Ja siis jäi yöks makkaamaa Teki puun alla tulen Ja kävi makkaamaa.	[ˈoli ˈʔyks ˈmie̯s̠ ˈelːæi̯] [ˈmæni ˈmet͡s̠æː ˈhulkːuˌmɑː] [jɑ ˈʔøks̠y] [jɑ ˈs̠iːs̠ ˈjæi̯ ˈyø̯ks̠ ˈmɑkːɑːˌmɑː] [ˈteki ˈpuːn ˈɑlːɒ ˈtulen] [jɑ ˈkæʋi ˈmɑkːɑːˌmɑː]	oli üks mies elläi mäni metsä̀ hulkkumà ja öksü ja siis jäi üöks makkàmà teki pūn allɒ tulen ja kävi makkàmà	Oli (yksi) mies eli Meni metsään hölskymään Ja eksyi Ja siis jäi yöksi nukkumaan Teki puun alla tulen Ja kävi nukkumaan.	There lived a man He drifted into the forest And got lost And then he stayed to sleep for the night He made a fire under a tree And went to sleep.

== See also ==
- Ingrian Finns
- Siberian Ingrian Finnish – Ingrian Finnish – Ingrian mixed language
- South Karelian dialects
- Savonian dialects
