= Ruben Nirvi =

Finnish linguist

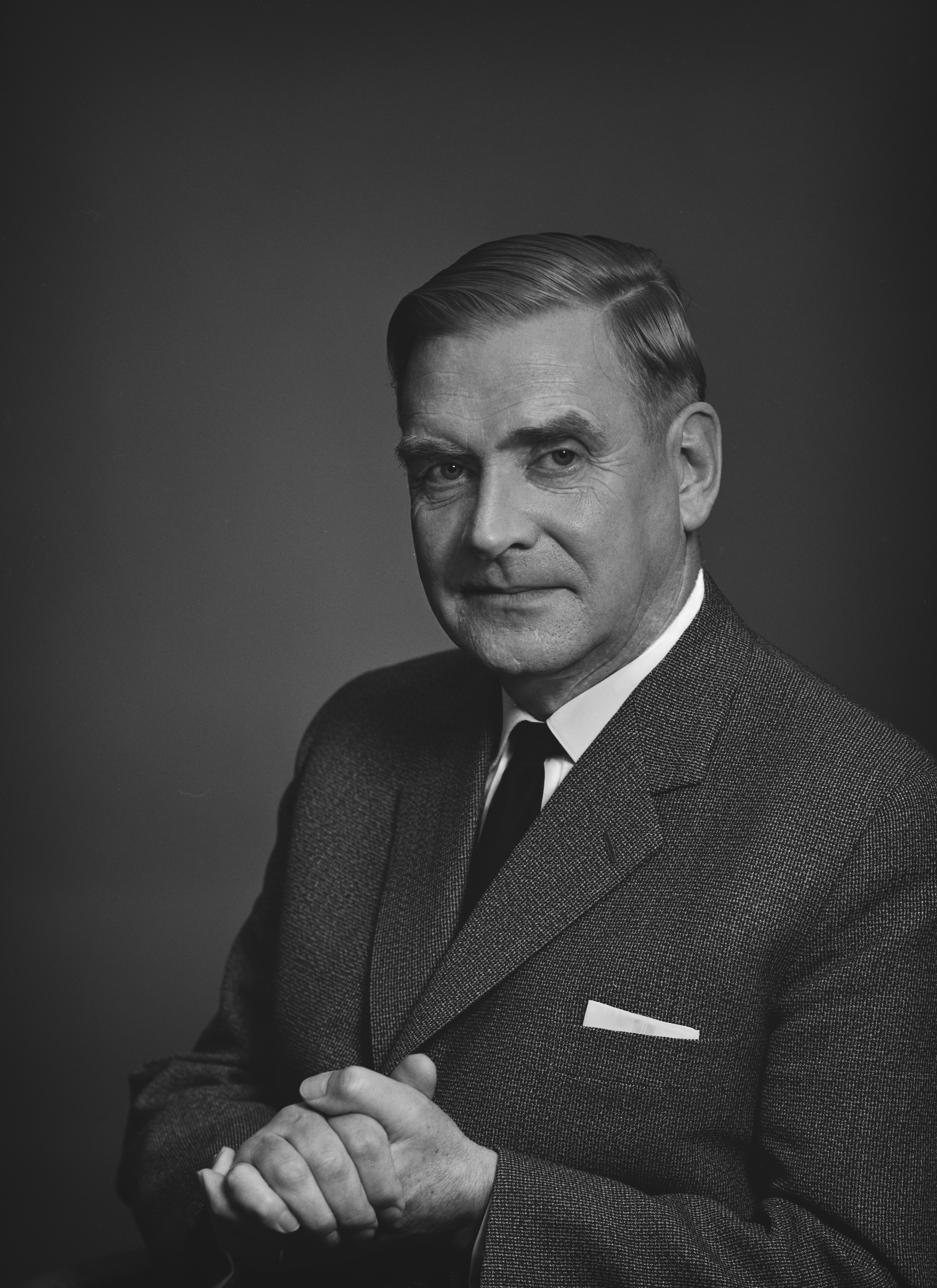
Ruben Nirvi in 1965.

Ruben Erik Nirvi (until 1928 Snirvi, born 16 December 1905 in Askola - died 26 January 1986 in Helsinki) was a Finnish linguist. He was the deputy of Finnish philology at the University of Helsinki from 1955 to 1957 and the personal additional professor of the Finnish language from 1957 to 1972. He was a special expert on Finnish, especially the Ingrian dialects. He defended his thesis Sanankieltoja ja niihin liittyviä kielenilmiöitä itämerensuomalaisissa kielissä: Riista- ja kotieläintalous ("Negative words and linguistic phenomena connected to them in Baltic Finnic languages: Game and animal husbandry").
