= Ingrian language =

Finnic language spoken by the Izhorians of Ingria, Russia

Ingrian
- Izhorian
- ižoran keeli
- Native to: Russia
- Region: Ingria
- Ethnicity: 1,143 Izhorians
- Native speakers: 76 (2020 census) < 20 (2018, estimated) < 10 (2025, estimated); 111 (2006, verified)
- Language family: Uralic: Finnic; Northern Finnic; Proto-Karelian; Ingrian
- Dialects: Hevaha †; Soikkola; Ylä-Laukaa †; Ala-Laukaa; ?Karelian Isthmus †
- Writing system: Latin

Language codes
- ISO 639-3: izh
- Glottolog: ingr1248
- ELP: Ingrian
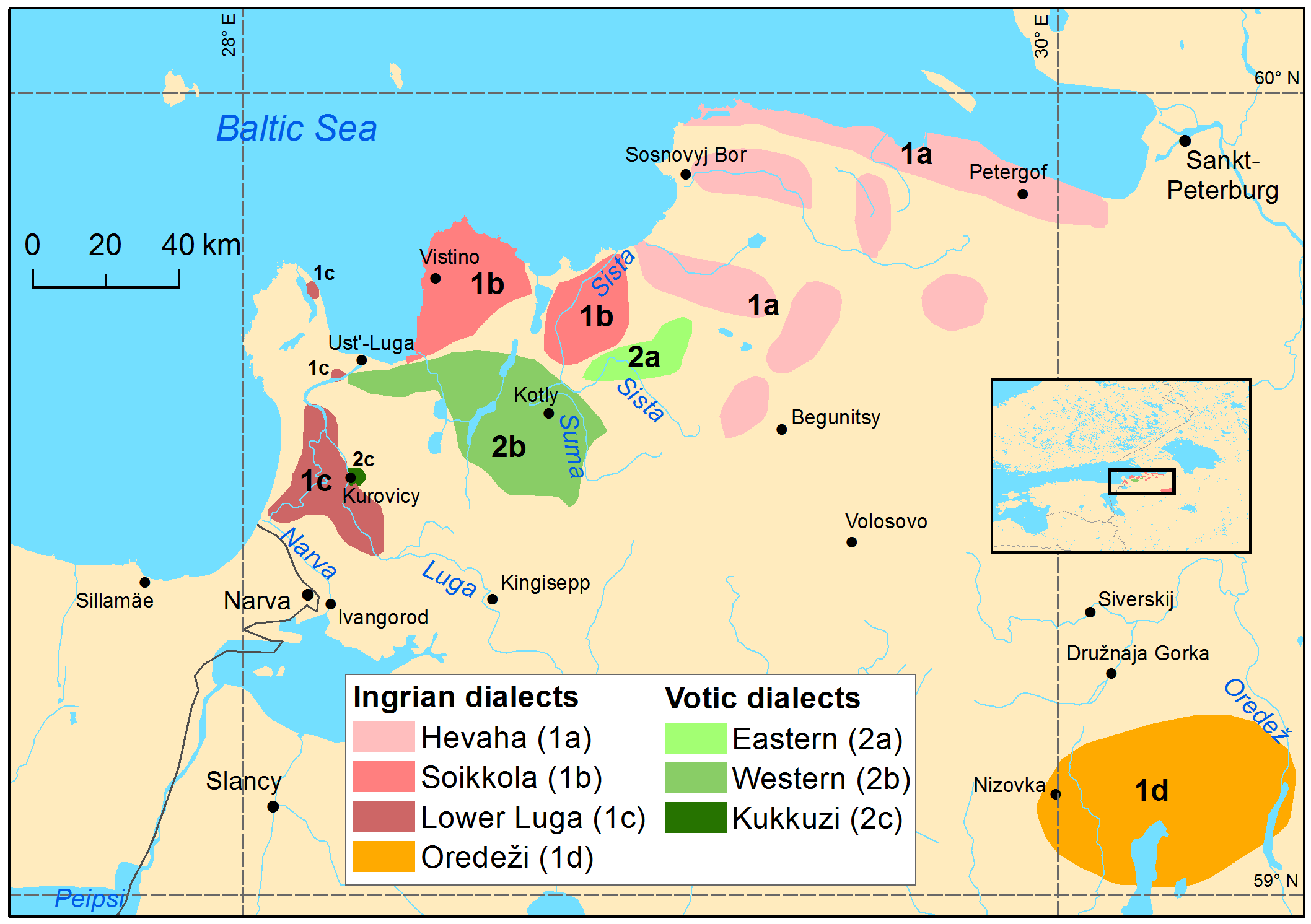
- Distribution of Ingrian and Votic at the beginning of the 20th century

- Ingrian is classified as Severely Endangered by the UNESCO Atlas of the World's Languages in Danger (2010).

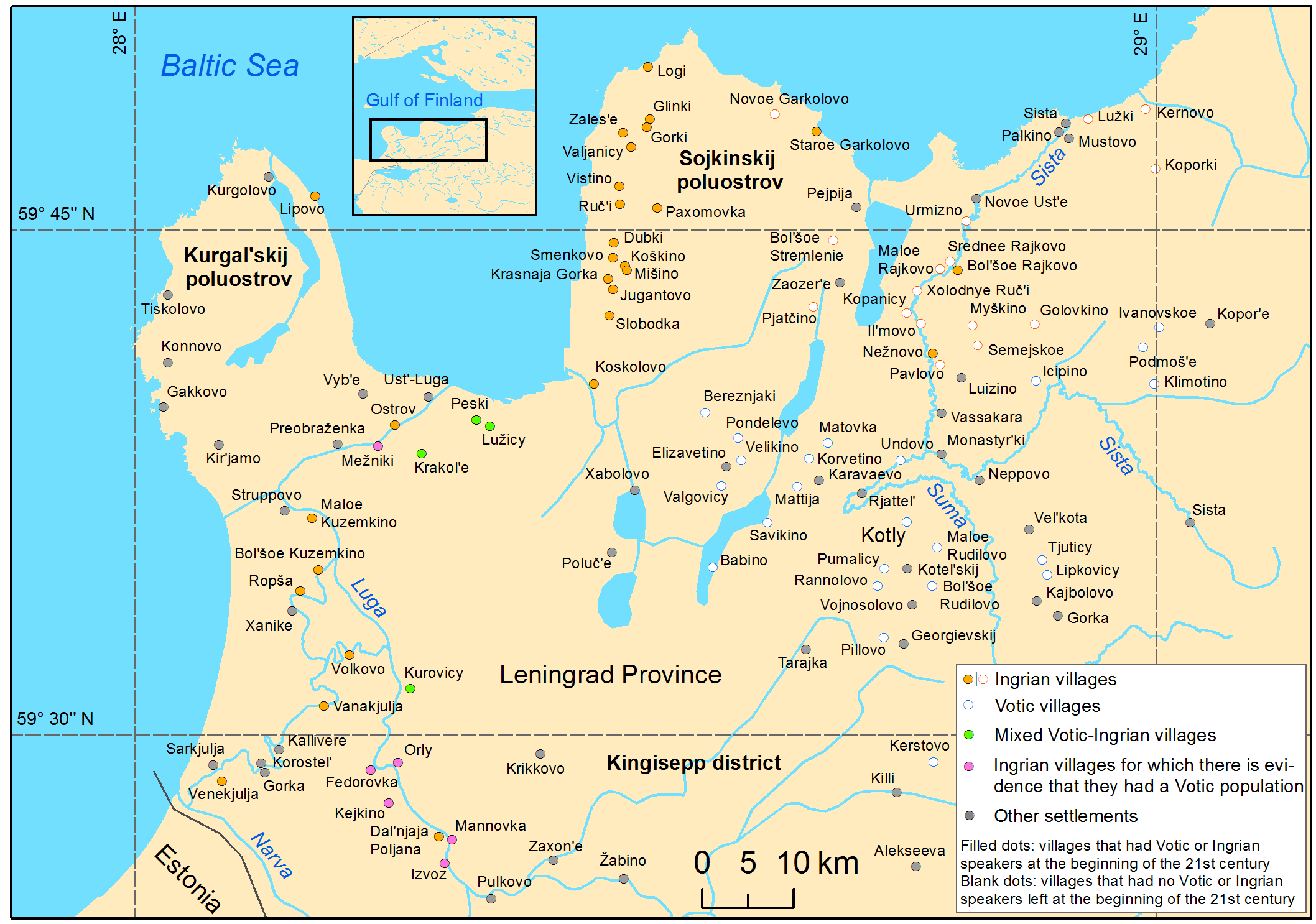
Ingrian and Votic villages at the beginning of the 21st century

Ingrian (inkeroin keeli, Soikkola: [ˈiŋɡ̊e̞roi̯ŋ ˈke̝ːlʲi]), also called Izhorian (ižoran keeli, Soikkola: [ˈiʒ̥o̞rɑŋ ˈke̝ːlʲi], Ala-Laukaa: [ˈiʒo̞rəŋ ˈkeːlʲ]), is a Finnic language spoken by the (mainly Orthodox) Izhorians of Ingria. It has approximately 70 native speakers left, most of whom are elderly.

The Ingrian language should be distinguished from the Ingrian dialect of the Finnish language, which became the majority language of Ingria in the 17th century with the influx of Lutheran Finnish immigrants; their descendants, the Ingrian Finns, are often referred to as Ingrians. The immigration of Lutheran Finns was promoted by Swedish authorities, who gained the area in 1617 from Russia, as the local population was (and remained) Orthodox.

== Dialects ==
Four dialect groups of Ingrian have been attested, two of which are likely extinct:

- Hevaha, spoken along Kovashi River and nearby coastal areas. (†)
- Soikkola, spoken on Soikinsky Peninsula and along Sista River.
- Ylä-Laukaa (Upper Luga or Oredezhi), spoken along Oredezh River and the upper Luga River. (†)
- Ala-Laukaa (Lower Luga), a divergent dialect influenced by Votic
  - The Kukkuzi dialect of Votic is often considered a mixed language of Lower Luga Ingrian and Votic. It is likely extinct. (†)
  - Siberian Ingrian Finnish is a mixed language of Lower Luga Ingrian Finnish and Lower Luga Ingrian spoken near Omsk in Siberia.

A fifth dialect may have once been spoken on the Karelian Isthmus in northernmost Ingria and may have been a substrate of local dialects of southeastern Finnish.

== History ==
=== Origin ===
Ingrian is classified, together with Finnish, Karelian (including Livvi), Ludic and Veps, in the Northern Finnic branch of the Uralic languages.

The exact origin of Izhorians, and by extension the Ingrian language, is not fully clear. Most scholars agree that Ingrian is most closely related to the Karelian language and the Eastern dialects of Finnish, although the exact nature of this relationship is unclear:

A popular opinion holds that the split of the Karelian and Ingrian languages can be traced back to around the 8th-12th centuries A.D., with the Ingrian language originating from a Pre-Karelian group travelling westward along the Neva river.

=== Pre-Soviet descriptions ===
The first Ingrian records can be traced back to the Linguarum totius orbis vocabularia comparativa by Peter Simon Pallas, which contains a vocabulary of the so-called Chukhna language, which contains terms in Finnish, Votic, and Ingrian.

Not much later, Fedor Tumansky, in a description of the Saint Petersburg Governorate adds vocabularies of various local languages, among which one he dubbed ямский ("the language of Yamburg"), corresponding to the modern Ala-Laukaa dialect of Ingrian.

During the Finnish national awakening in the end of the 19th century, as the collection of Finnic folk poetry became widespread, a large number of poems and songs were recorded in lands inhabited by Izhorians, as well, and ultimately published in various volumes of Suomen kansan vanhat runot. The songs, although originally sung in the Ingrian language, have been noted using Finnish grammar and Finnish phonology in many cases, as the collectors were not interested in the exact form of the original text.

One of the collectors of the Ingrian poems, Volmari Porkka, went on to write the first grammatical description of Ingrian, including sections on the Ingrian dialects of Finnish. This grammar includes a thorough analysis of the Soikkola, Hevaha, and Ala-Laukaa dialects, and includes a handful of texts (notably, fairy tales, including traditional versions of The Little Humpbacked Horse and Tsarevitch Ivan, the Firebird and the Gray Wolf) in all four dialects of Ingrian.

=== Early Soviet period ===
In 1925, Julius Mägiste wrote a second grammatical description of Ingrian, this time of the Finnic varieties spoken in a handful of villages along the Rosson, which showed both Ingrian and Finnish features. This variety was closely related to the modern Siberian Ingrian Finnish. Simultaneously, in the late 1920s, Ingrian-speaking selsovets started to form across the Ingrian-speaking territory.

In 1932, a total of 19 schools were opened where education was performed in Ingrian. A first primer in the Ingrian language was published, based on a subdialect of Soikkola Ingrian. The primer was the first of a series of schoolbooks written in this dialect. A number of features characteristic of the language in which these books were written included the vowel raising of mid vowels, and a lack of distinction between voiced, semivoiced and voiceless consonants.

By 1935, the number of Ingrian schools increased to 23 (18 primary schools and 5 secondary schools). At the same time, a systematic process of assimilation had begun.

In 1936, Väinö Junus, one of the authors of the above mentioned books, wrote a grammar of the Ingrian language, in Ingrian. In the grammar, Junus introduced a literary language for Ingrian, which he based on the then most populous dialects: the Soikkola and Ala-Laukaa dialects. Junus' grammar included rules for spelling and inflection, as well as a general description of the spoken Ingrian language. The grammar introduced a new age of written Ingrian, and was soon followed by another wave of schoolbooks, written in the new literary variety of Ingrian. The Ingrian schools stayed open until the mass repressions in 1937, during which Väinö Junus and many other teachers were executed, the schoolbooks were confiscated, and by 1938, the Ingrian selsovets were closed. Many Izhorians were sent to concentration camps or executed.

During the world war, many Izhorians fell in battle, and starved due to the famine the war brought. A large number of Izhorians was deported, among with Ingrian Finns and Votians to Finland in 1943–1944, as part of an agreement between Finland and Germany during the Continuation War. Almost all Izhorian families decided to return to the Soviet Union after the war ended. Upon return to the Soviet Union after the war, Izhorians were banned from settling their native lands, and were instead scattered across the nation.

Due to the many repressions, deportations and war, the number of Izhorians, as well as Ingrian speakers, decreased dramatically. The 1926 census counted over 16.000 Izhorians. In 1939 this number decreased to just over 7.000, and by 1959 just 369 people claimed to be native Ingrian speakers.

=== Alphabet (1932) ===
A a	Ä ä	E e	F f	H h	I i	J j	K k
L l	M m	N n	O o	Ö ö	P p	R r	S s
T t	U u	V v	Y y	B b	G g	D d	Z z

=== Alphabet (1936) ===
The order of the 1936 alphabet is similar to the Russian Cyrillic alphabet.

A a	Ä ä	B b	V v	G g	D d	E e	Ƶ ƶ
Z z	I i	J j	K k	L l	M m	N n	O o
Ö ö	P p	R r	S s	T t	U u	Y y	F f
H h	C c	Ç ç	Ş ş	ь

=== Alphabet (2005–present) ===
The order of the current alphabet matches the Finnish alphabet.

A a	B b	C c	D d	E e	F f	G g	H h
I i	J j	K k	L l	M m	N n	O o	P p
R r	S s	Š š	T t	U u	V v	Y y	Z z
Ž ž	Ä ä	Ö ö	(Ь ь)

Sometimes, palatalisation may be indicated using the apostrophe.

== Grammar ==
Like other Uralic languages, Ingrian is a highly agglutinative language. Ingrian inflection is exclusively performed using inflectional suffixes, with prefixes being only used in derivation.

Ingrian nouns and adjectives are inflected for number (singular and plural) and case. Ingrian nominals distinguish between twelve cases, with a thirteenth (the comitative) only being present in nouns. Like Finnish, Ingrian has two cases used for the direct object: the nominative-genitive (used in telic constructions) and the partitive (used in atelic constructions). Ingrian adjectives often have a separate comparative form, but lack a morphologically distinct superlative.

Ingrian distinguishes between three persons. There is no distinction in gender, but there is an animacy distinction in interrogative pronouns.

Ingrian verbs feature four moods: indicative, conditional, imperative and the now rare potential. Verbs are inflected for three persons, two numbers and a special impersonal form for each of the moods, although the imperative lacks a first person form. The indicative has both present and past forms. Negation in Ingrian is expressed by means of a negative verb that inflects by person and has separate imperative forms.

== Phonology ==
Consonant inventory of the extant Ingrian dialects
		Labial	Alveolar	Postalveolar/ Palatal	Velar	Glottal
Nasal		/m/	/n/		[ŋ]	
Plosive	voiceless	/p/	/t/		/k/	
Plosive	halfvoiced	[b̥]	[d̥]		[ɡ̊]	
Plosive	voiced	/b/	/d/		/ɡ/	
Affricate			/t͡s/	/t͡ʃ/		
Fricative	voiceless	/f/	/s/	/ʃ/	[x]	/h/
Fricative	halfvoiced			[ʒ̥]		
Fricative	voiced		/z/	/ʒ/		
Trill			/r/			
Lateral			/l/, [l]	[lʲ]	[ɫ]	
Approximant		/ʋ/		/j/		

The phonology of the two extant Ingrian varieties differs substantially. The Soikkola dialect features a threefold contrast in consonant length ([t] vs [tˑ] vs [tː]) as well as a threefold distinction in voicing ([t] vs [d̥] vs [d]). The Ala-Laukaa dialect, on the contrary only has a twofold contrast in both length and voicing ([tː], [dː] vs [t], [d]), but features highly prominent vowel reduction, resulting in phonetically both reduced and voiceless vowels ([o] vs [ŏ] vs [ŏ̥]).

Both dialects show various processes of consonant assimilation in voicing and, in the case of the nasal phoneme /n/, place of articulation. The consonant inventory of the Ala-Laukaa dialect is relatively larger, as it includes a number of loaned phonemes not or only partially distinguished in the Soikkola dialect.

To the right, the consonant inventory of Ingrian is shown. The consonants highlighted in red are only found in the Ala-Laukaa dialect or as loaned phonemes, while consonants in green are only found in the Soikkola dialect. Both phonemes (slashes) and allophones (brackets) are shown.

Stress in Ingrian generally falls on the first syllable, with a secondary stress on every uneven nonfinal syllabe (third, fifth, etc.). An exception is the word paraikaa ("now"), which is stressed on the second syllable. Furthermore, some speakers might stress borrowed words according to the stress rules of the donor language.

== Morphophonology ==
The Ingrian language has several morphophonological processes.

Vowel harmony is the process that the affixes attached to a lemma may change depending on the stressed vowel of the word. This means that if the word is stressed on a back vowel, the affix would contain a back vowel as well, while if the word's stress lies on a front vowel, the affix would naturally contain a front vowel. Thus, if the stress of a word lies on an "a", "o" or "u", the possible affix vowels would be "a", "o" or "u", while if the stress of a word lies on an "ä", "ö" or "y", the possible affix vowels to this word would then be "ä", "ö" or "y":

nappi (button, nominativa); nappia (button, partitiva)
näppi (pinch, nominativa); näppiä (pinch, partitiva)

The vowels "e" and "i" are neutral, that is to say that they can be used together with both types of vowels.

== Vocabulary ==
The words in the Ingrian language are mostly of native Finnic origin, and show great similarity with the surrounding Finnish and Estonian languages. Below is given a Leipzig–Jakarta list of the Ingrian language:

Leipzig–Jakarta list of Ingrian
English	Ingrian			Finnish	Estonian	Etymological notes
English	Literary Ingrian	Ala-Laukaa	Soikkola	Finnish	Estonian	Etymological notes
fire	tuli	[ˈtulʲi]	[ˈtuli]	tuli	tuli	< PF *tuli
nose	nenä	[ˈnenæ]	[ˈnenæ]	nenä	nina	< PF *nenä
to go	männä	[ˈmænː]	[ˈmænːæ]	mennä	minna	< PF *mendäk
water	vesi	[ˈʋesi]	[ˈʋeʒ̥i]	vesi	vesi	< PF *veci
mouth	suu	[ˈsuː]	[ˈʃuː]	suu	suu	< PF *suu
tongue	keeli, keel	[ˈkeːlʲ]	[ˈkeːlʲ(i)]	kieli	keel	< PF *keeli
blood	veri	[ˈʋeri]	[ˈʋeri]	veri	veri	< PF *veri
bone	luu	[ˈɫuː]	[ˈɫuː]	luu	luu	< PF *luu
you; thou	siä	[ˈsiæ̯]	[ˈʃiæ̯]	sinä	sina, sa	< PF *sinä
root	juuri, juur	[ˈjuːrʲ]	[ˈjuːr(i)]	juuri	juur	< PF *juuri
to come	tulla	[ˈtuɫː]	[ˈtuɫːɑ]	tulla	tulla	< PF *tuldak
breast	nännä	[ˈnænː]	[ˈnænːæ]	(rinta)	(rind)	< PF *nännä The Finnish and Estonian terms are reflected in Ingrian rinta ("chest")
rain	vihma	[ˈʋihm]	[ˈʋihmɑ]	vihma	vihm	< PF *vihma
I	miä	[ˈmiæ̯]	[ˈmiæ̯]	minä	mina, ma	< PF *minä
name	nimi	[ˈnimi]	[ˈnimi]	nimi	nimi	< PF *nimi
louse	täi	[ˈtæi̯]	[ˈtæi̯]	täi	täi	< PF *täi
wing	siipi	[ˈsiːpʲ]	[ˈʃiːb̥i]	siipi	tiib	< PF *siipi ~ *tiipa
meat; flesh	liha	[ˈlʲihɑ]	[ˈlʲihɑ]	liha	liha	< PF *liha
arm; hand	käsi	[ˈkæsi]	[ˈkæʒ̥i]	käsi	käsi	< PF *käci
fly	kärpäin	[ˈkærpəi̯n]	[ˈkærpæi̯n]	kärpänen	kärbes	< PF *kärpähinen
night	öö	[ˈøː]	[ˈøː]	yö	öö	< PF *öö
ear	korva	[ˈkorʋ]	[ˈkorʋɑ]	korva	kõrv	< PF *korva
neck	kagla	[ˈkɑɡɫ]	[ˈkɑɡɫɑ]	kaula	kael	< PF *kakla
far	etähääl	[ˈetːælʲː]	[ˈed̥æhæːl]	etäällä	(kaugel)	< PF *etähällä
to do; to make	tehä	[ˈtehæ]	[ˈtehæ]	tehdä	teha	< PF *tektäk
house	talo	[ˈtɑɫo]	[ˈtɑɫoi̯]	talo	(maja)	< PF *taloi
stone	kivi	[ˈkiʋi]	[ˈkiʋi]	kivi	kivi	< PF *kivi
bitter	karkia	[ˈkɑrke]	[ˈkɑrkiɑ]	(kitkerä)	(mõru)	< PF *karkeda
to say	sannoa	[ˈsɑnːo]	[ˈʃɑnˑoɑ]	sanoa	(ütlema)	< PF *sanodak
tooth	hammas	[ˈhɑmːəz]	[ˈhɑmːɑʒ̥]	hammas	hammas	< PF *hambas
(strand of) hair	hius	[ˈhiu̯z]	[ˈhiu̯ʒ̥]	hius	juus	< PF *hibus
big	suur, suuri	[ˈsuːrʲ]	[ˈʃuːr(i)]	suuri	suur	< PF *suuri
one	yks	[ˈyksʲ]	[ˈykʃ]	yksi	üks	< PF *ükci
who?	'ken?	[ˈken]	[ˈken]	(kuka?)	kes?	< PF *ken
he; she	hää	[ˈhæn]	[ˈhæː]	hän	(tema, ta)	< PF *hän
to hit	löövvä	[ˈlʲøːʋː]	[ˈløːʋːæ]	lyödä	lüüa	< PF *löödäk
leg; foot	jalka	[ˈjɑɫk]	[ˈjɑɫɡ̊ɑ]	jalka	jalg	< PF *jalka
horn	sarvi	[ˈsɑrʋʲ]	[ˈʃɑrʋi]	sarvi	sarv	< PF *sarvi
this	tämä	[ˈtæmæ]	[ˈtæmæ]	tämä	(see)	< PF *tämä
fish	kala	[ˈkɑɫɑ]	[ˈkɑɫɑ]	kala	kala	< PF *kala
yesterday	egle	[ˈeɡlʲ]	[ˈeɡle]	eilen	eile	< PF *eklen
to drink	joovva	[ˈjuʋː]	[ˈjoːʋːɑ]	juoda	juua	< PF *joodak
black	musta	[ˈmust]	[ˈmuʃtɑ]	musta	must	< PF *musta
navel	napa	[ˈnɑpɑ]	[ˈnɑb̥ɑ]	napa	naba	< PF *napa
to stand	seissa	[ˈsei̯sː]	[ˈʃei̯ʃːɑ]	seistä	seista	< PF *saictak
to bite	purra	[ˈpurː]	[ˈpurːɑ]	purra	pureda	< PF *purdak
back	selkä	[ˈselʲk]	[ˈʃelɡ̊æ]	selkä	selg	< PF *selkä
wind	tuuli, tuul	[ˈtuːlʲ]	ˈtuːl(i)]	tuuli	tuul	< PF *tuuli
smoke	savvu	[ˈsɑʋːŭ̥]	[ˈʃɑʋːu]	savu	(suits)	< PF *savu
what?	mikä?	[ˈmikæ]	[ˈmiɡ̊æ]	mikä?	mis?	< PF *mi(kä)
child	laps, lapsi	[ˈɫɑpsʲ]	[ˈɫɑpʃ(i)]	lapsi	laps	< PF *lapci
egg	muna	[ˈmunɑ]	[ˈmunɑ]	muna	muna	< PF *muna
to give	antaa	[ˈɑntɑ]	[ˈɑntɑː]	antaa	anda	< PF *antadak
new	uus, uusi	[ˈuːsʲ]	[ˈuːʒ̥(i)]	uusi	uus	< PF *uuci
to burn	pallaa	[ˈpɑɫːɑ]	[ˈpɑɫˑɑː]	palaa	põleda	< PF *paladak
not	ei	[ˈei̯]	[ˈei̯]	ei	ei	< PF *ei
good	hyvä	[ˈhyʋæ]	[ˈhyʋæ]	hyvä	hea	< PF *hüvä
to know	tiitää	[ˈtiːtæ]	[ˈtiːtæː]	tietää	teada	< PF *teetädäk
knee	polvi	[ˈpoɫʋʲ]	[ˈpoɫʋi]	polvi	põlv	< PF *polvi
sand	liiva	[ˈlʲiːʋ]	[ˈlʲiːʋɑ]	(hiekka)	liiv	< PF *liiva
to laugh	nagraa	[ˈnɑɡrɑ]	ˈnɑɡrɑː]	nauraa	naerda	< PF *nakradak
to hear	kuulla	[ˈkuːɫː]	[ˈkuːɫːɑ]	kuulla	kuulda	< PF *kuuldak
soil	maa	[ˈmɑː]	[ˈmɑː]	maa	maa	< PF *maa
leaf	lehti	[ˈlʲehtʲ]	[ˈlehti]	lehti	leht	< PF *lehti
red	punain	[ˈpunɑi̯n]	[ˈpunˑɑi̯n]	punainen	punane	< PF *punainën
liver	leipäliha	[ˈlʲei̯pəˌlʲihɑ]	[ˈlei̯b̥æˌlʲihɑ]	(maksa)	(maks)	< leipä ("bread") + liha ("meat")
to hide	peittää	[ˈpei̯tːæ]	[ˈpei̯tːæː]	peittää	peita	< PF *peittädäk
skin; leather	nahka	[ˈnɑxk]	[ˈnɑxkɑ]	nahka	nahk	< PF *nahka
to suck	immiä	[ˈimːe]	[ˈimˑiæ]	imeä	imeda	< PF *imedäk
to carry	kantaa	[ˈkɑntɑ]	[ˈkɑntɑː]	kantaa	kanda	< PF *kantadak
ant	muurahain	[ˈmuːrəhəi̯n]	[ˈmuːrɑhɑi̯n]	muurahainen	(sipelgas)	< PF *muurahainën
heavy	raskas	[ˈrɑskəz]	[ˈrɑʃkɑʒ̥]	raskas	raske	< PF *raskas ~ *raskëda
to take	ottaa	[ˈotːɑ]	[ˈotːɑː]	ottaa	võtta	< PF *vottadak
old	vanha	[ˈʋɑnɑ]	[ˈʋɑnhɑ]	vanha	vana	< PF *vanha
to eat	söövvä	[ˈsyʋː]	[ˈʃøːʋːæ]	syödä	süüa	< PF *söödäk
thigh	reis	[rei̯sʲ]	[ˈrei̯ʒ̥]	reisi	reis	< PF *raici
long	pitkä	[pitk]	[ˈpitkæ]	pitkä	pikk	< PF *pitkä
to blow	puhhua	[ˈpuxːo]	[ˈpuxˑuɑ]	(puhaltaa)	puhuda	< PF *puhudak
wood	puu	[ˈpuː]	[ˈpuː]	puu	puu	< PF *puu
to run	joossa	[ˈjoːsː]	[ˈjoːʃːɑ]	juosta	joosta	< PF *joostak
to fall	langeta	[ˈɫɑŋɡet]	[ˈɫɑŋɡ̊ed̥ɑ]	(pudota)	langeda	< PF *langët'ak
eye	silmä	[ˈsilʲm]	[ˈʃilʲmæ]	silmä	silm	< PF *silmä
ash	tuhka	[ˈtuxk]	[ˈtuxkɑ]	tuhka	tuhk	< PF *tuhka
tail	häntä	[ˈhænt]	[ˈhænd̥æ]	häntä	händ	< PF *häntä
dog	koira	[ˈkoi̯r]	[ˈkoi̯rɑ]	koira	koer	< PF *koira
to cry	itkiä	[ˈitke]	[ˈitkiæ]	itkeä	(nutma)	< PF *itkedäk
to tie	sittoa	[ˈsitːo]	[ˈʃitˑoɑ]	sitoa	siduta	< PF *sitodak
to see	nähä	[ˈnæhæ]	[ˈnæhæ]	nähdä	näha	< PF *näktäk
sweet	makkia	[ˈmɑkːe]	[ˈmɑkˑiɑ]	makea	(magus)	< PF *makëda
rope	köys, köysi	[ˈkøy̯sʲ]	[ˈkøy̯ʒ̥(i)]	köysi	köis	< PF *keüci
shadow	kupain	[ˈkupɑi̯n]	[ˈkub̥ɑhɑi̯n]	(varjo)	(vari)	
bird	lintu	[ˈlʲintŭ̥]	[ˈlʲind̥u]	lintu	lind	< PF *lintu
salt	soola	[ˈsoːɫ]	[ˈʃoːɫɑ]	suola	sool	< PF *soola
small	peeni, peen	[ˈpeːnʲ]	[ˈpeːn(i)]	pieni	peen	< PF *peeni
wide	levviä	[ˈlʲeʋːe]	[ˈleʋˑiæ]	leveä	(lai)	< PF *levedä
star	tähti	[ˈtæhtʲ]	[ˈtæhti]	tähti	täht	< PF *tähti
inside	sises	[ˈsisesː]	[ˈʃiʒ̥eʒ̥]	sisässä	sees	< PF *sicässä
hard	kova	[ˈkoʋɑ]	[ˈkoʋɑ]	kova	kõva	< PF *kova
to grind	jauhaa	[ˈjɑu̯hɑ]	[ˈjɑu̯hɑː]	jauhaa	(jahvatama)	< PF *jauhadak

Nevertheless, borrowings from Russian, both old and new, are very common. Some borrowings from Finnish, Estonian and Votic are also present:

A selection of common borrowed terms in Ingrian
Ingrian			English	Source
Literary Ingrian	Ala-Laukaa	Soikkola	English	Source
risti	[ˈristʲ]	[ˈriʃti]	"cross"	< Old East Slavic крьстъ (krĭstŭ) "cross"
lässiä	[ˈlʲæsːe]	[ˈlæʃˑiæ]	"to be ill"	< Old East Slavic лежати (ležati) "to lie"
ležžiä	[ˈlʲeʒːe]	[ˈleʃˑiæ]	"to lie"	< Russian лежать (ležatʹ) "to lie"
kapusta	[ˈkɑpust]	[ˈkɑb̥uʃtɑ]	"cabbage"	< Russian капуста (kapusta) "cabbage"
trappu	[ˈtrɑpːŭ̥]	[ˈtrɑpːu]	"stair"	< Finnish (t)rappu "stair"
vahti	[ˈʋɑhtʲ]	[ˈʋɑhti]	"guard"	< Finnish vahti "guard"
riikki	[ˈriːkʲː]	[ˈriːkːi]	"country"	< Estonian riik "country"
lusti	[ˈɫustʲ]	[ˈɫuʃti]	"pretty"	< Estonian lust "pleasure"
api	[ˈɑpi]	[ˈɑb̥i]	"help"	< Votic api "help"
roho	[ˈroho]	[ˈroho]	"grass"	< Votic roho "grass"

== Bibliography ==
- Paul Ariste 1981. Keelekontaktid. Tallinn: Valgus. [pt. 2.6. Kolme läänemere keele hääbumine lk. 76 – 82] (in Estonian)
- A. Laanest. 1993. Ižorskij Jazyk. In V. N. Jartseva (ed.), Jazyki Mira: Ural'skie Jazyki, 55–63. Moskva: Nauka.
