= Institute for Linguistic Studies =

Russian research institution

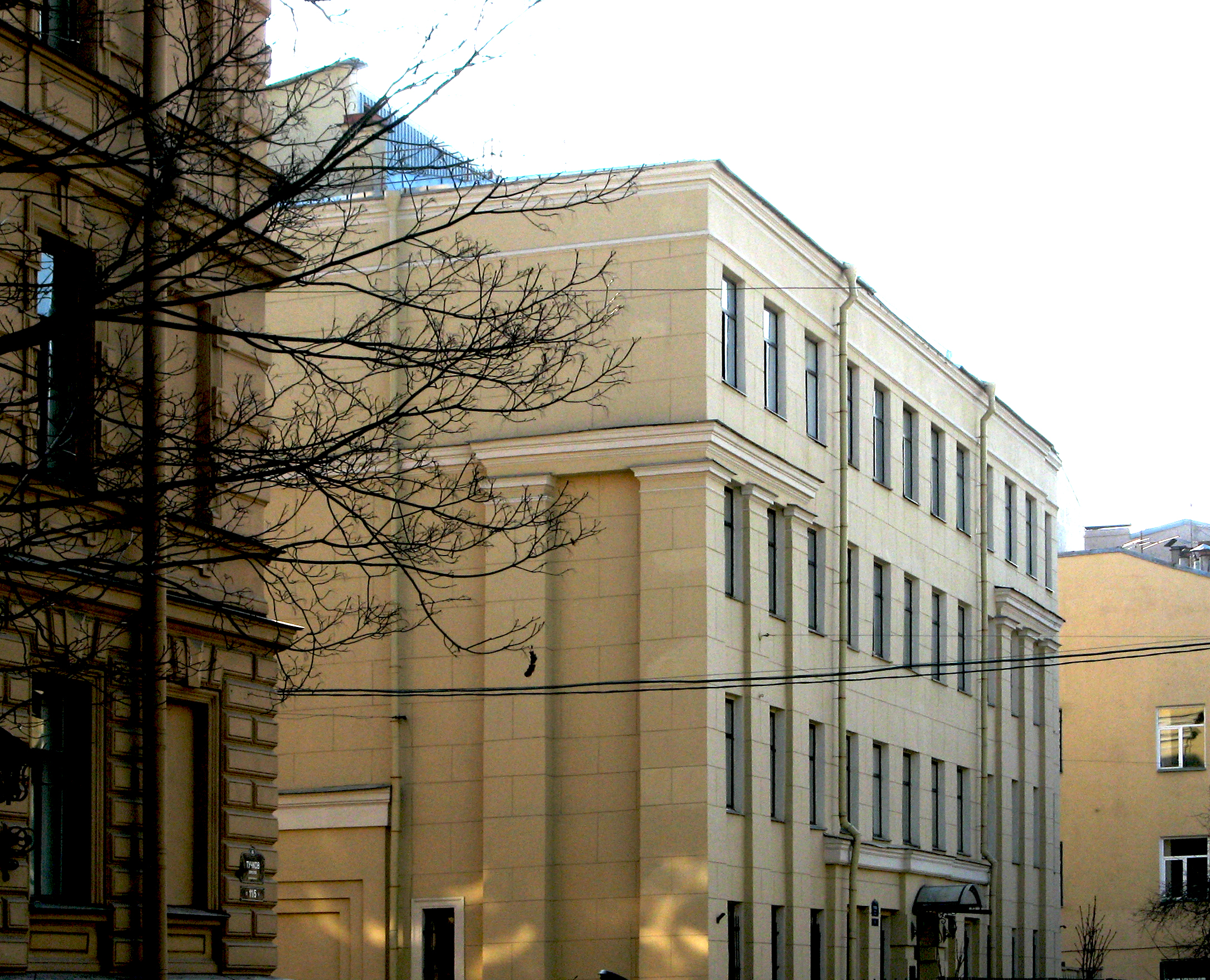
- The institute building on Vasilyevsky Island
- Established: 1921; 104 years ago
- Head: Evgeny Golovko
- Staff: ca. 185
- Address: 9 Tuchkov Lane
- Location: Saint Petersburg, Russia
- Website: iling.spb.ru

The Institute for Linguistic Studies of the Russian Academy of Sciences (Russian: Институт лингвистических исследований РАН), commonly abbreviated ILS RAS, is a research institution in Saint Petersburg, Russia and one of the major centers in the field of linguistic research in the country.

It is composed of eight departments and two laboratories that conduct research in the subfields of comparative and historical linguistics, lexicography, functional theories of grammar, linguistic typology and linguistic anthropology.

== Publications and conferences ==
Two open access academic journals are published at the institute: the triannual Acta Linguistica Petropolitana and the yearly Indo-European Linguistics and Classical Philology.

Several yearly conferences are held at the institute, including the Conference on Typology and Grammar for Young Scholars.

== See also ==
- Institute of Linguistics of the Russian Academy of Sciences
