= Evangelical Lutheran Church of Ingria =

Lutheran church of the Scandinavian tradition in Russia

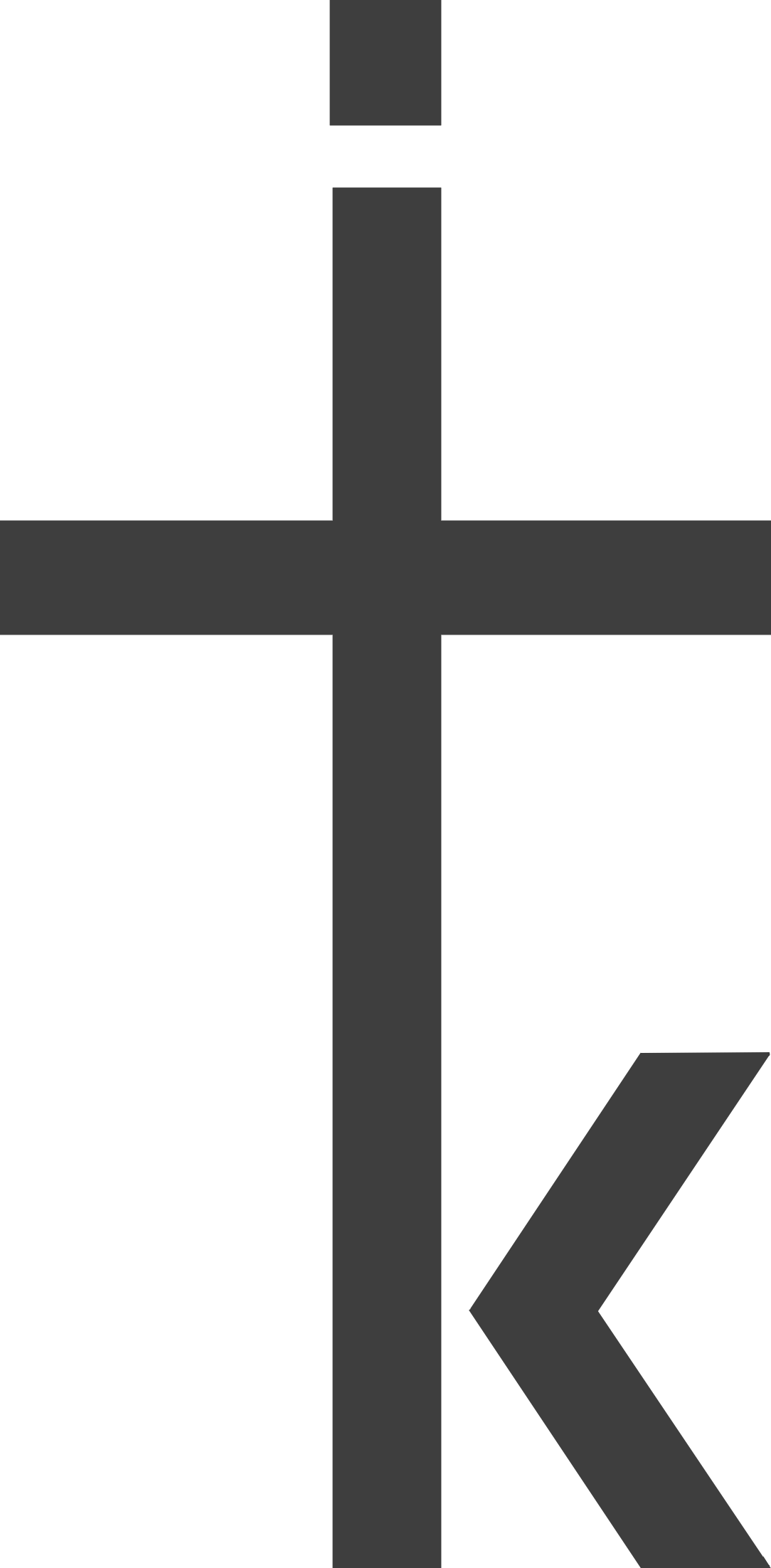
Evangelical Lutheran Church of Ingria
- Евангелическо-лютеранская церковь Ингрии; Inkerin evankelis-luterilainen kirkko
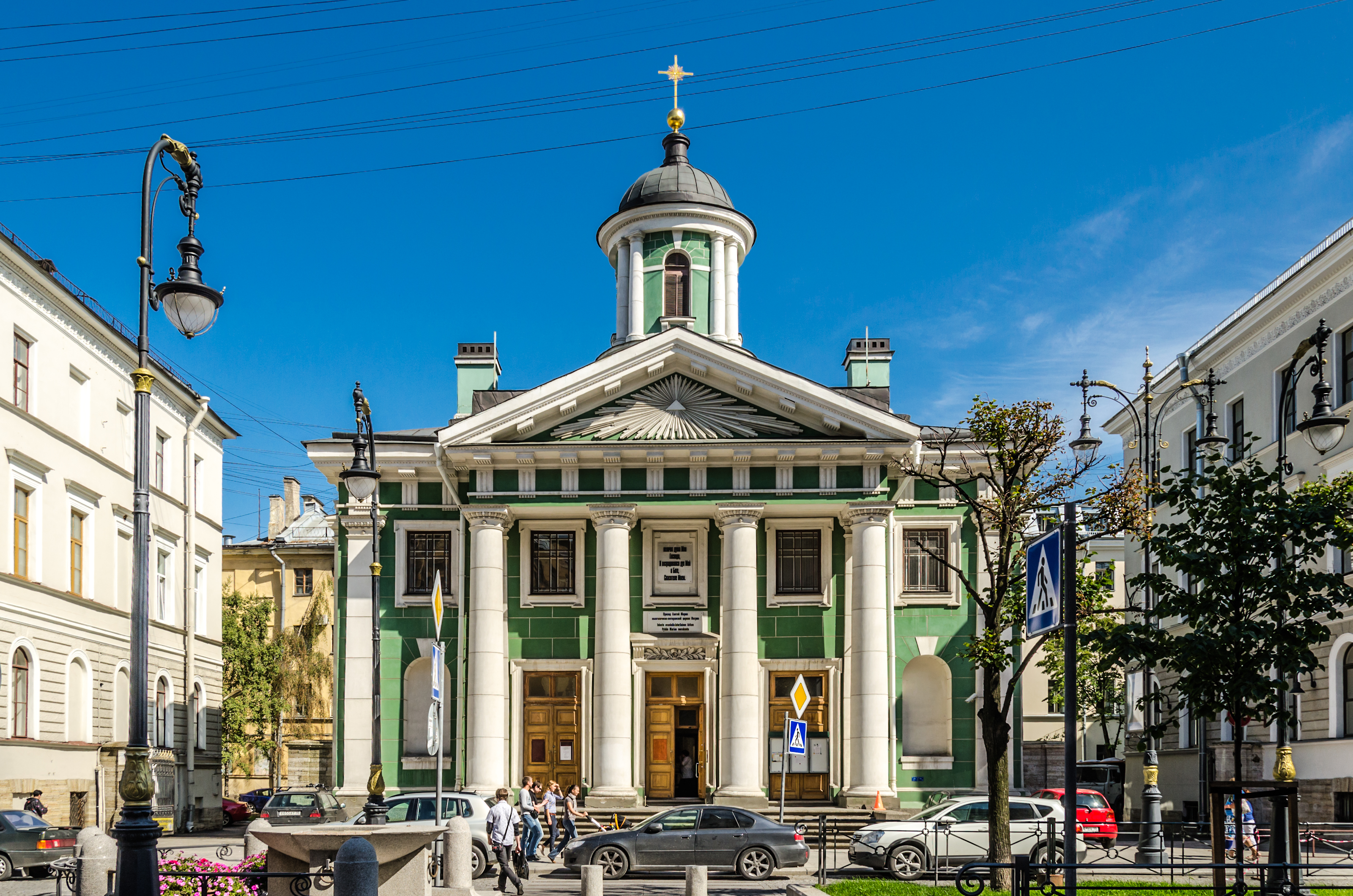
- Evangelical Lutheran Church of Saint Mary, St. Petersburg
- Classification: Protestant
- Orientation: High Church Lutheranism, Lutheran
- Theology: Evangelical Catholic; Confessional
- Polity: Episcopal
- Presiding Bishop: Ivan Laptev
- Associations: Lutheran World Federation, International Lutheran Council
- Region: Russia
- Language: Russian, Finnish, Mari, Moksha, Erzya
- Origin: 1611; independence 1992.
- Separated from: Estonian Evangelical Lutheran Church
- Congregations: 90
- Members: 15,000
- Official website: www.elci.ru

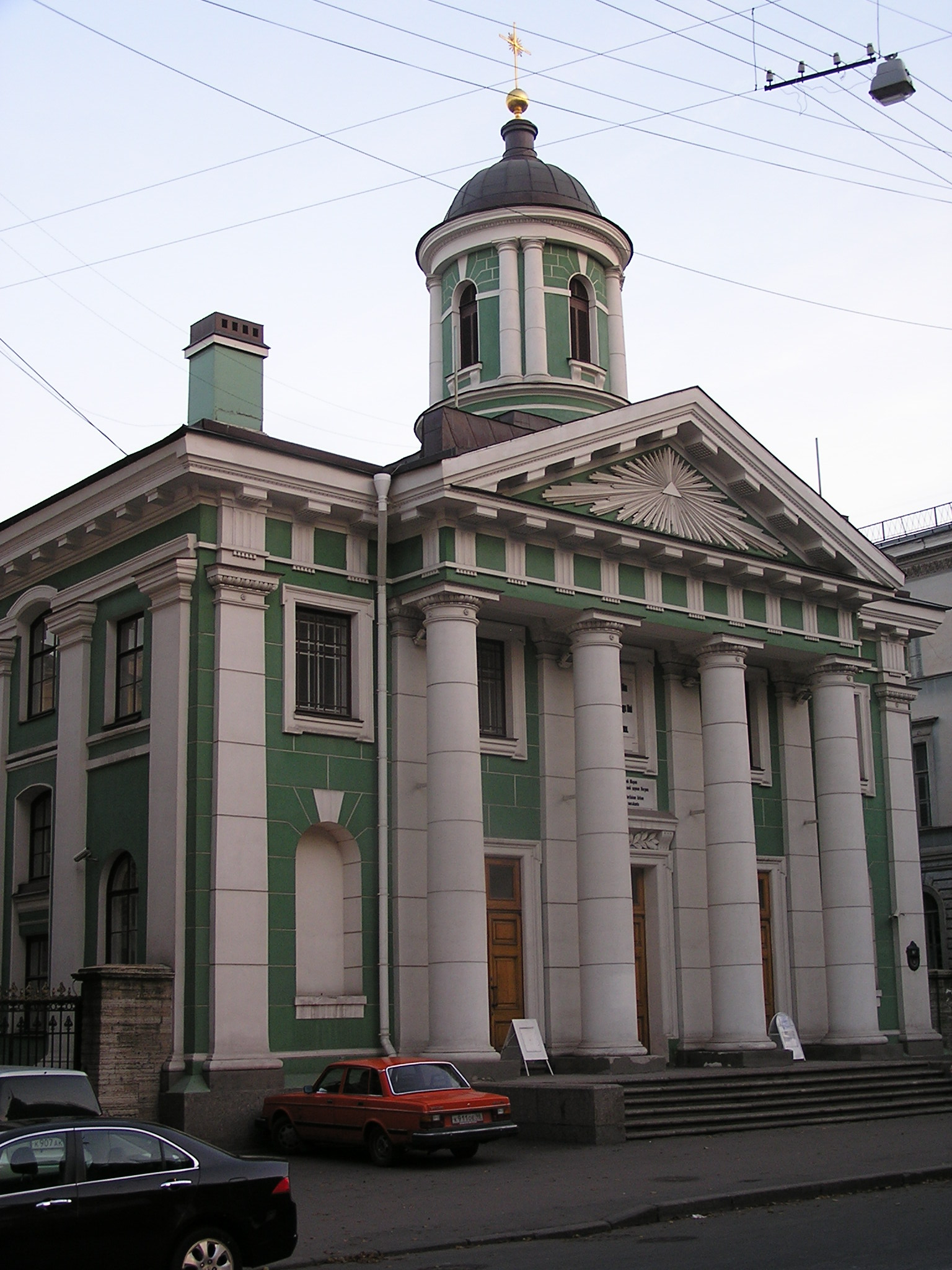
Church of Saint Mary in Saint Petersburg

The Evangelical Lutheran Church of Ingria (Russian: Евангелическо-лютеранская церковь Ингрии, Yevangelichesko-lyuteranskaya tserkov Ingriyi; Finnish: Inkerin evankelis-luterilainen kirkko; also the Church of Ingria) is a Lutheran church of the Scandinavian tradition in Russia. By 2020 it was the second largest Lutheran church in Russia (behind the Evangelical Lutheran Church in Russia and the Other States), with 90 congregations and 15,000 members, and was active mostly in Ingria and Karelia.

It is one of six Lutheran denominations in Russia.

== History ==
During the 1600s, the area of Ingria (or Ingermanland) covered the edges of Finland, Estonia, Sweden and Russia. Many Finnish-speaking people moved to Ingria and formed a group who followed the Lutheran denomination of the Christian faith; they came to be known as Ingrian Finns.

The ELCIR was founded in 1611.

=== Russian Imperial era ===
By the time that the Russians had retaken Ingria in 1721 following the Great Northern War, 28 Lutheran parishes had been established. In 1734, Empress Anna Ioannovna presented the Scandinavian-Lutheran community with a plot of land in Nevsky Prospekt, where a wooden church dedicated to Saint Anna was built. In 1767, the Church of Saint Mary in Saint Petersburg was constructed, and it became the central church for Finns in Russia. On July 20, 1819, Emperor Alexander I issued a decree for the creation of an official Evangelical-Lutheran see, to which all Lutheran parishes of the Russian Empire would be subordinate. In January 1820, at the invitation of Alexander I, a Finnish bishop named Zacarias Signeus from the city of Porvoo had arrived in St. Petersburg. With the help of Archbishop Jakob Tengström of Finland, the bishop began to reorganize the church life of both St. Petersburg and throughout Russia. However, the death of Alexander I prevented the goal of reorganizing the Lutheran Church from being accomplished. In a law signed by Nicholas I on December 28, 1832, there was no mention of the historical episcopate. The Narva Synod was abolished and the role of management in the Lutheran church was occupied primarily by the Germans.

By 1900, ecclesiastical law stated that Lutheran churches could only preach in Finnish, and the denomination helped to preserve the language in the region for many years.

=== Soviet era ===
By the time of the 1917 revolution, the area boasted 32 Lutheran congregations, as well as a Lutheran high school, a teacher training institute and many elementary schools.

In the early years of soviet rule, the attitude of the Bolsheviks towards the Finnish Church was one of tolerance. The Finns were allowed not only to organize their own church, but also to begin preaching in Russian. In January 1919, representatives from Finnish parishes gathered in Petrograd and formed the Committee of Finnish-Ingrian Evangelical Lutheran Communities, and by the end September of the same year the committee decided to declare the Finnish Church of Ingermanland independent because the German committee no longer existed.

On March 3, 1921, the Russian Evangelical Lutheran Episcopal Council officially proclaimed that from now on the parishes of the Church of Ingria would form an independent synodal district with a consistory. A General Synod was organized in Moscow, which existed until 1935, after which a bishop's council was later formed. Its chairman was Probst Felix Fridolf Relander, a Finnish pastor who was consecrated bishop of the Finnish Lutheran parishes in 1921.

In 1925, Relander died and his duties passed to a consistory of three pastors and four laymen. One of these pastors, Selim Yalmari Laurikkala, who had previously served as the rector of the Church of Saint Regina in Vsevolozhsk, became chairman of the consistory, but was not named bishop. Under him, the parishes were led by the Ingermanland Evangelical Lutheran Main Church Council, which was organized according to a charter of two clergy and five other persons elected for three year terms.

However, this situation did not last long. On April 8, 1929, by decree of the Presidium of the All-Russian Central Executive Committee, parochial education, youth groups, and all types of social services were prohibited. From 1928 to 1935, over 18,000 Ingrians were deported to Kazakhstan, Siberia, East Karelia, and the Kola Peninsula as a part of Joseph Stalin's Five Year Plan. In the spring of 1935, the NKVD was tasked with "the cleaning of the twenty-two kilometer border strip of kulak and anti-Soviet element". As a result, the Kuivozovsky Finnish National District ceased to exist and more than 1936 thousand people were expelled from it. In 1930, Ingrians were resettled in Vologda.

The last Lutheran service was officially held in 1939, although secret services were held in homes and barns. All Ingrian parishes had been closed, pastors and the most active parishioners either had emigrated or been repressed, and churches had their properties confiscated. About 68,000 Ingrians lived in the territories occupied by the Wehrmacht during World War II. In order to investigate the living conditions of the local population, a commission was created that visited Gatchina, Pushkin, Krasnoye Selo, Tosno, and Volosovo. Taking into account the opinion of the commission, in order to satisfy the spiritual hunger of the locals, in August 1942 the military chaplain Lieutenant Juhani Jaskeläinen was sent from Finland. In the spring of 1943, he was joined by pastors Jussi Tenkku and Reino Jylönen. About 20 communities began to operate again, confirmation classes were conducted, and the sacraments were performed. However, by 1943, in connection with the deportation of Ingrians to the Klooga concentration camp, the revival ended abruptly. The last service was performed by Pastor Reynaud Jylönen at St. Catherine's Church in Petrovo.

Up until the 1950s, there were secret assemblies of believers among the Ingrians, mostly led by women. In May 1949, Matti Kukkonen, a former member of the church council in Koltushi, returned from exile to Petrozavodsk. Having settled in a private house on the outskirts of the city, he began on his own initiative to conduct divine services, perform the sacraments, and confirm those who wished.

In 1953, two surviving pastors, Juhani Vassel and Paavo Jaime, carried out, as best they could, the spiritual care of a small group that had returned to their native places. They settled in Petrozavodsk. Upon their return, the spiritual life of the community of Karelia was revived. People were again able to receive the Lord's supper and participate in confirmation training. In the summer, pastors held spiritual meetings in cemeteries because of the large number of people. Often such meetings were reported and dispersed by the police.

In 1958, the community in Petrozavodsk was visited by the Estonian Archbishop Jan Kiyvit, who gave advice on how to register the community. However, the application of the Ingrian Lutheran church to the Council for Religious Affairs under the Council of Ministers of the Soviet Union, which had 703 signatures, was rejected.

=== As a part of the Estonian Church (1960s–1992) ===
In the late 1960s, Ingrians became part of the Estonian Lutheran Church and the first service was held in the old church in Narva. It was conducted by an Estonian pastor named Elmer Kuhl, who did not speak Finnish and therefore served via transcription, but the church, designed to seat 250, gathered 800 people for the first service. A congregation was also set up at Petrozavodsk in Karelia. Further development of the church is associated with Arvo Survo, originally a deacon at the Church of the Resurrection in Pushkin. In the late 1980s, he and his associates began the restoration of church buildings in Finnish villages, beginning with a church in the village of Gubanitsy, Volosovsky District. A total of five new churches were built and sixteen old ones were restored. In December 1987, Archbishop Kuno Pajula of Estonia ordained Arvo Survo to the priesthood. In 1989, Survo raised the issue of creating an independent Ingermanland presbytery within the Church of Estonia, but was initially denied.

On May 4, 1989, representatives of five Ingrian parishes signed a declaration in Gubanitsy for the re-establishment of the Finnish Evangelical Lutheran Church of Ingria, "completely independent in internal life", although "recognizing the authority" of the Estonian Archbishop, and formed a Board headed by A. Kuortti and A. Survo. On July 19, 1989, the parish in Koltushi was registered, and on February 22, 1990, parishes in Kuzyomkino, Toksovo, Skvoritsy, and Gatchina were registered. In 1990, the Church of Estonia allocated the newly established parishes to the Ingermanland presbytery, headed by Pastor Leino Hassinen, who was invited from Finland. On May 19, 1991, Archbishop Pajula ordained four more pastors in Gubanitsy to serve in the Ingermanland provostship. On July 10, 1991, the Council of the Ingermanland provostship decided to establish an independent Church of Ingria. And in August 1991, the independence from the Estonian Church was proclaimed, and on January 1, 1992, with the consent of the Evangelical Lutheran Church of Estonia, the Ingermanland Provostship was transformed into an independent Evangelical Lutheran Church of Ingria. The Russian authorities registered the new church on September 14, 1992. The primate of the church was Leino Hassinen, who was consecrated a bishop in 1993.

=== 1992–present ===
On November 5, 1991, a parish in Saransk was registered - the first missionary parish in the Russian province. In October 1992, the Church of St. George in Kolbino, the first Ingrian church building built on the historical lands of Ingermanland after 1917, was consecrated.

In 1995, the rector of the Koltush community, Arri Kugappi, became the new bishop of the Church of Ingria. The consecration was performed by bishops Leino Hassinen, Matti Sihvonen, Vernet, Henrik Svenungsson, and Georg Kretschmar, as well as Archbishop Jaan Kiyvit.

On May 10, 2019, Kugappi informed the Synodal Council of the Church of his desire to retire by age within the period established by the charter. On October 19, 2019, at the XXX Synod of the ELCI, Ivan Sergeevich Laptev, the rector of the Theological Institute of the Church of Ingria and of the Gubanitsy parish, was elected the new bishop.

On February 9, 2020, at a solemn divine service in the Church of St. Mary, Pastor Ivan Laptev was ordained a bishop. The ordination was performed by Bishop Emeritus Kugappi, Archbishop Jānis Vanags, Vsevolod Lytkin, Tiit Salumäe, and Seppo Häkkinen.

In 2025, a synod decided to rename the church to Russian Lutheran Church (Russian: Российскую лютеранскую церковь). A year earlier, movements like Free Ingria had been banned.

== Structure ==
=== Administrative structure ===
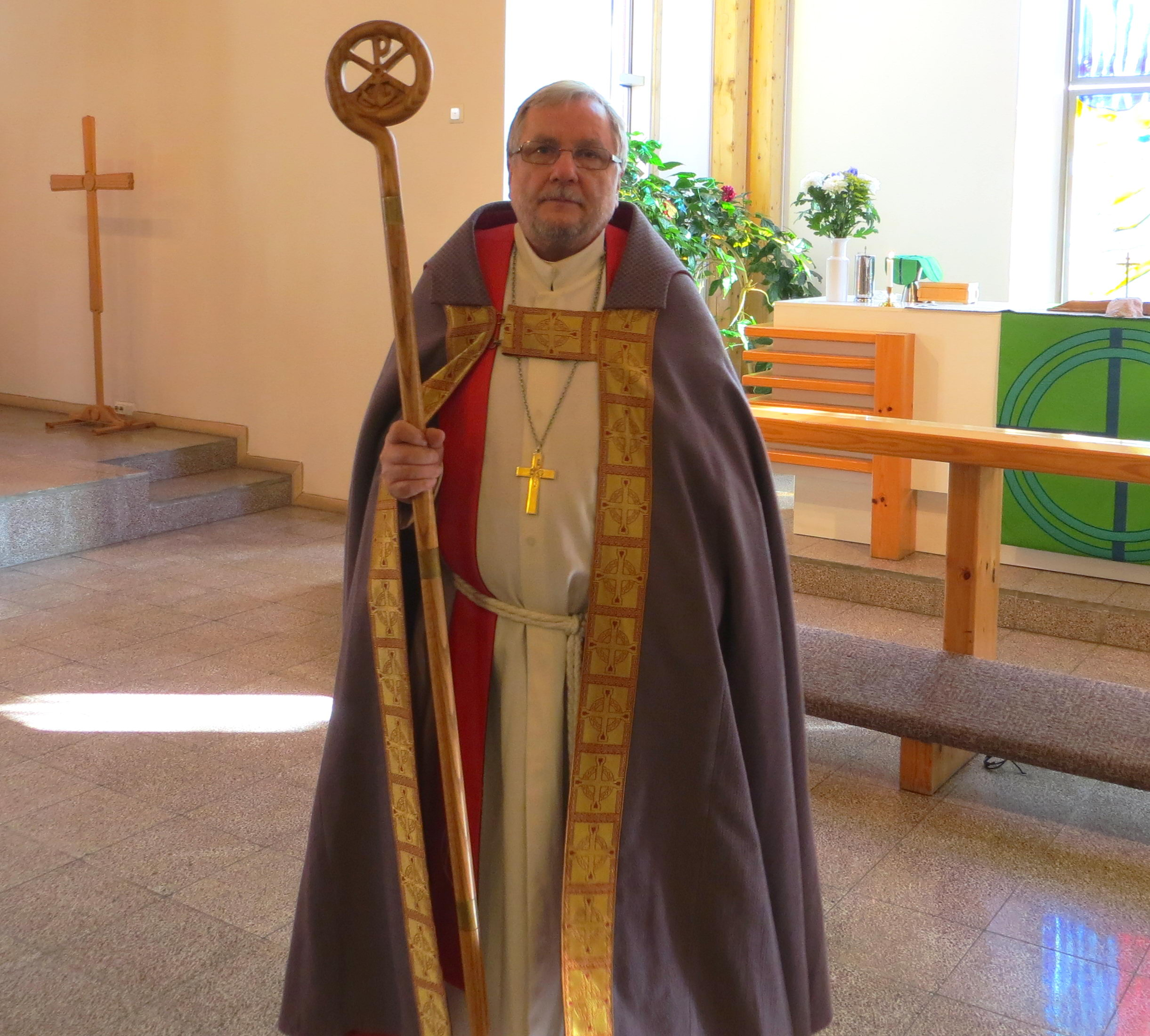
Bishop Emeritus of the Church of Ingria Aarre Kuukauppi

Administratively, the Church of Ingria is one diocese, cared for by a bishop.

The main structural unit of the church is the parish, headed by a parson in the rank of pastor or, if necessary, in the rank of deacon (temporarily, for a period of up to 2 years). The highest governing body of the parish is the general meeting of the parish. During the period between general meetings, the temporal affairs of the parish are managed on its behalf by an elected board of commissioners, headed by a chairman from among the parishioners. To implement decisions made and manage the current affairs of the parish, the board of commissioners elects a parish council, the chairman of which is the parson. There are 75 parishes grouped into seven deaneries, as well as several preaching stations; services are mainly held in Russian.

The cathedral of the Church of Ingria is the Church of St. Maria in St. Petersburg, on Bolshaya Konyushennaya Street. The Central Office of the church is also located there. A church educational institution, the Theological Institute of the Church of Ingria, which trains clergy and church workers, is located in the village of Kolbino, Vsevolozhsk district, Leningrad Oblast.

The denomination is a partner church with the Lutheran Church – Missouri Synod.

=== Spiritual service ===
In the Church of Ingria there are three degrees of spiritual (priestly) ministry:

- Bishop (head of the diocese)
- Presbyter (often called pastor)
- Deacon (assistant to the bishop and presbyters)

Traditionally, all of them can be designated by the general concept of "clergy".

To help parish clergy, the Church of Ingria has approved the position of catechist. A catechist is not a clergyman, but is called to perform the functions of a clergyman.

=== Charitable (diaconal) activities ===
The Church of Ingria has a diocesan Diaconal Committee which determines priority areas of charitable activities on a church-wide scale and organizes similar activities in local communities. The diocesan diaconal fund, intended to support people in difficult financial situations and parish diaconal projects, is funded through voluntary donations.

The Church of Ingria is the founder of several nursing homes (Koltushi, Taytsy, Kikerino, “House of Mercy” in Tyrö, “House of Mary” in Tervolovo), as well as a number of charitable church units and autonomous non-profit organizations, such as:

- Autonomous non-profit organizations: "Manna" (St. Petersburg), "Trilistnik" (Kronstadt), "Kolibri" (Volosovo),"Anna is helping" (St. Petersburg), "Necropolis" (St. Petersburg), and "Bethlehe" (Voronezh)
- Parish Drug Addiction Center (Luga)
- Social service "Vector"
- Crisis center of the Church of Ingria, "Helping your neighbor"

=== Pilgrimage activities ===
Pilgrimage activities are carried out through the autonomous non-profit organization "Pilgrimage Center Novaya Zemlya" (St. Petersburg).

=== Publishing activities ===
The Church of Ingria is the founder of the publishing house "Verbum" LLC.

The Church of Ingria previously published the magazines “Church of Ingria” in Russian and “Inkerin Kirkko” in Finnish; printing ceased in mid-2023.

== Territorial division ==
The Church of Ingria is territorially divided into nine probations: St. Petersburg, Moscow, Karelian, Volga, Ural, Siberian, West Ingermanland, Northern and Southern.

=== West Ingermanland Probation ===
- Church of St. Lazarus in Kingisepp
- Church of St. Nicholas in Gatchina
- Church of St. Peter in Gatchina
- Church of the Holy Apostles Peter and Paul in Yalgelevo
- Church of St. Andrew in Bolshoye Kuzyomkino
- Church of St. John the Baptist in Gubanitsy
- Church of St. Catherine in Petrovo
- Church of St. Mary Magdalene in Luga
- Parish in Volosovo

== See also ==
- Evangelical Lutheran Church of Finland
- Evangelical Lutheran Church in Russia, Ukraine, Kazakhstan and Central Asia
- Estonian Evangelical Lutheran Church
- Siberian Evangelical Lutheran Church

== Literature ==
- Александрова Е. Л., Браудзе М. М., Высоцкая В. А., Петрова Е. А. История финской Евангелическо-лютеранской церкви Ингерманландии / Браудзе М. М. — СПб.: Гйоль, 2012. — 400 с. — ISBN 978-5-904790-08-0
- Андреева Л. Е. В связи с юбилеем Теологического института Церкви Ингрии на территории России // Религия. Церковь. Общество, № 4, 2015. C. 364—367.
- Исаев С. А. Евангелическо-лютеранская церковь Ингрии // Православная энциклопедия.
- Крылов П. В. Ингрия, ингерманландцы и Церковь Ингрии в прошлом и настоящем. Статьи и лекции разных лет (СПб: Гйоль). ISBN 978-5-904790-15-8
- Кугаппи А. М. (ред.) Путь веры длиною в столетия (СПб, Гйоль)
- Лиценбергер О. А. Евангелическо-лютеранская церковь и Советское государство (1917—1938). М., «Готика», 1999.
- Лиценбергер О. А. Евангелическо-лютеранская церковь в Российской истории (XVI—XX вв.). М.: Фонд «Лютеранское культурное наследие», 2004.
- Резниченко А. Я. История и современное состояние Евангелическо-лютеранской церкви Ингрии на территории России // Государство, религия, церковь в России и за рубежом, 2011. С. 237—240.
- Сеппонен Ээро Как в Санкт-Петербурге появился лютеранский епископ
- Щипков А. В. Русский вариант финского лютеранства // Истина и жизнь. — 1996. — № 11.
- Jääskeläinen Juhani Inkerin suomalainen evankelis-luterilainen kirkko neuvostojärjestelmän ensimäisenä vuosikymmenenä 1917—1927 (1980)
