= Volosovo =

Volosovo (Russian: Волосово) is the name of several inhabited localities in Russia.

== Leningrad Oblast ==
As of 2022, two inhabited localities in Leningrad Oblast bear this name.

Urban localities

- Volosovo, Volosovsky District, Leningrad Oblast, a town in Volosovsky District; incorporated as Volosovskoye Settlement Municipal Formation

Rural localities

- Volosovo, Volkhovsky District, Leningrad Oblast, a village in Potaninskoye Settlement Municipal Formation of Volkhovsky District

== Moscow Oblast ==
As of 2022, two rural localities in Moscow Oblast bear this name:

- Volosovo, Chekhovsky District, Moscow Oblast, a village in Stremilovskoye Rural Settlement of Chekhovsky District
- Volosovo, Klinsky District, Moscow Oblast, a village in Petrovskoye Rural Settlement of Klinsky District

== Nizhny Novgorod Oblast ==
As of 2022, one rural locality in Nizhny Novgorod Oblast bears this name:

- Volosovo, Nizhny Novgorod Oblast, a village in Bolsheokulovsky Selsoviet of Navashinsky District

== Novgorod Oblast ==
As of 2022, one rural locality in Novgorod Oblast bears this name:

- Volosovo, Novgorod Oblast, a village in Opechenskoye Settlement of Borovichsky District

== Pskov Oblast ==
As of 2022, three rural localities in Pskov Oblast bear this name:

- Volosovo, Gdovsky District, Pskov Oblast, a village in Gdovsky District
- Volosovo, Plyussky District, Pskov Oblast, a village in Plyussky District
- Volosovo, Pskovsky District, Pskov Oblast, a village in Pskovsky District

== Tver Oblast ==
As of 2022, seven rural localities in Tver Oblast bear this name:

- Volosovo, Kalininsky District, Tver Oblast, a village in Kalininsky District
- Volosovo, Kalyazinsky District, Tver Oblast, a village in Kalyazinsky District
- Volosovo, Likhoslavlsky District, Tver Oblast, a village in Likhoslavlsky District
- Volosovo, Sonkovsky District, Tver Oblast, a village in Sonkovsky District
- Volosovo, Torzhoksky District, Tver Oblast, a village in Torzhoksky District
- Volosovo, Vesyegonsky District, Tver Oblast, a village in Vesyegonsky District
- Volosovo, Zubtsovsky District, Tver Oblast, a village in Zubtsovsky District

== Vladimir Oblast ==
As of 2022, two rural localities in Vladimir Oblast bear this name:

- Volosovo, Petushinsky District, Vladimir Oblast, a village in Petushinsky District
- Volosovo, Sobinsky District, Vladimir Oblast, a selo in Sobinsky District

== Vologda Oblast ==
As of 2022, two rural localities in Vologda Oblast bear this name:

- Volosovo, Ust-Kubinsky District, Vologda Oblast, a village in Nikolsky Selsoviet of Ust-Kubinsky District
- Volosovo, Ustyuzhensky District, Vologda Oblast, a village in Nikiforovsky Selsoviet of Ustyuzhensky District

== Yaroslavl Oblast ==
As of 2022, four rural localities in Yaroslavl Oblast bear this name:

- Volosovo, Borisoglebsky District, Yaroslavl Oblast, a village in Andreyevsky Rural Okrug of Borisoglebsky District
- Volosovo, Trofimovsky Rural Okrug, Danilovsky District, Yaroslavl Oblast, a village in Trofimovsky Rural Okrug of Danilovsky District
- Volosovo, Yermakovsky Rural Okrug, Danilovsky District, Yaroslavl Oblast, a village in Yermakovsky Rural Okrug of Danilovsky District
- Volosovo, Pervomaysky District, Yaroslavl Oblast, a village in Prechistensky Rural Okrug of Pervomaysky District
