= Ivan Laptev =

- Presiding Bishop of the Evangelical Lutheran Church of Ingria
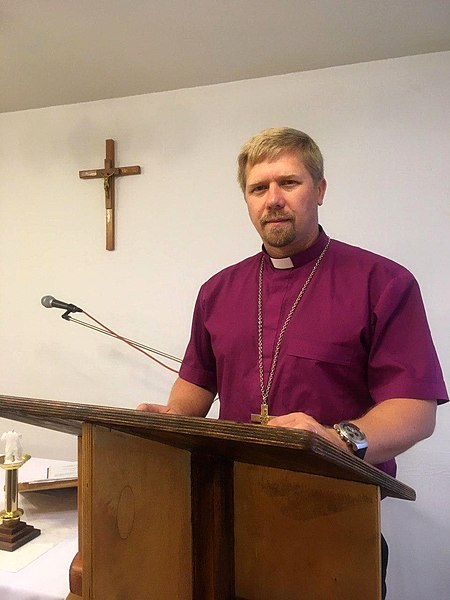
- Laptev visiting the Lutheran parish in Nizhny Novgorod in July of 2020
- Church: Evangelical Lutheran Church of Ingria
- Elected: October 19, 2019
- Installed: February 9, 2020
- Predecessor: Arri Kugappi

Orders
- Ordination: 2004 by Arri Kugappi
- Consecration: February 9, 2020 by Janis Vanags

Personal details
- Born: 1 April 1979 (age 47) Leningrad Oblast, Soviet Union
- Education: Theological Institute of the Church of Ingria

Ivan Sergeevich Laptev (Russian: Иван Сергеевич Лаптев; born 1 April 1979) is a Russian Ingrian Lutheran theologian who serves as the Presiding Bishop of the Evangelical Lutheran Church of Ingria.

== Biography ==
Ivan Sergeevich was born in the village of Zanevka in the Leningrad Oblast in the Union of Soviet Socialist Republics on April 1, 1979, into a large Ingrian family. Laptev was baptized in the Lutheran church as an infant. Laptev's grandmother, Raukha Ivanovna Loginova (née Nenonen), came from a family of Ingrian Finns. In 1942 at the age of 8, she was taken from the Vsevolozhsky district to Siberia along the Road of Life. In 1957 she returned to Vsevolozhsky District. She played a key role in Laptev's conversion to Lutheranism. In an interview with TBN, Laptev said that despite the best efforts of his grandmother, his parents were not religious.

In 2004 he was called to serve as a deacon and ordained by Bishop Arry Kugappi. In 2008, he entered the Theological Institute of the Church of Ingria, in 2011 he graduated with a bachelor's degree, after which he was ordained a priest. In autumn of 2013, he was assigned as the pastor of the Church of St. John the Baptist parish in Kupanitsa. In October 2015, he was called to serve as acting rector of the Theological Institute of the Church of Ingria, where he taught a number of classes.

On October 19, 2019, at the XXXth Synod of the ELCI, Laptev was voted by a majority to succeed the retiring Arri Matveevich Kugappi. On January 13, 2020, Laptev officially became the bishop-elect, and on February 9, 2020, at a solemn divine service in the Cathedral of St. Mary in St. Petersburg, he was consecrated a Bishop. The consecration was performed by Archbishop Jānis Vanags of Latvia, along with Bishop-Emeritus Arri Kugappi and bishops Vsevolod Lytkin, Tiit Salumäe, and Seppo Häkkinen.

== Personal life ==
Laptev is of Ingrian-Finnish heritage and he lives in St. Petersburg with his wife and 4 children.

Religious titles
Preceded by Arri Kugappi	Presiding Bishop of the Evangelical Lutheran Church of Ingria; 2018 – present	Incumbent
