= Peter Vaulin =

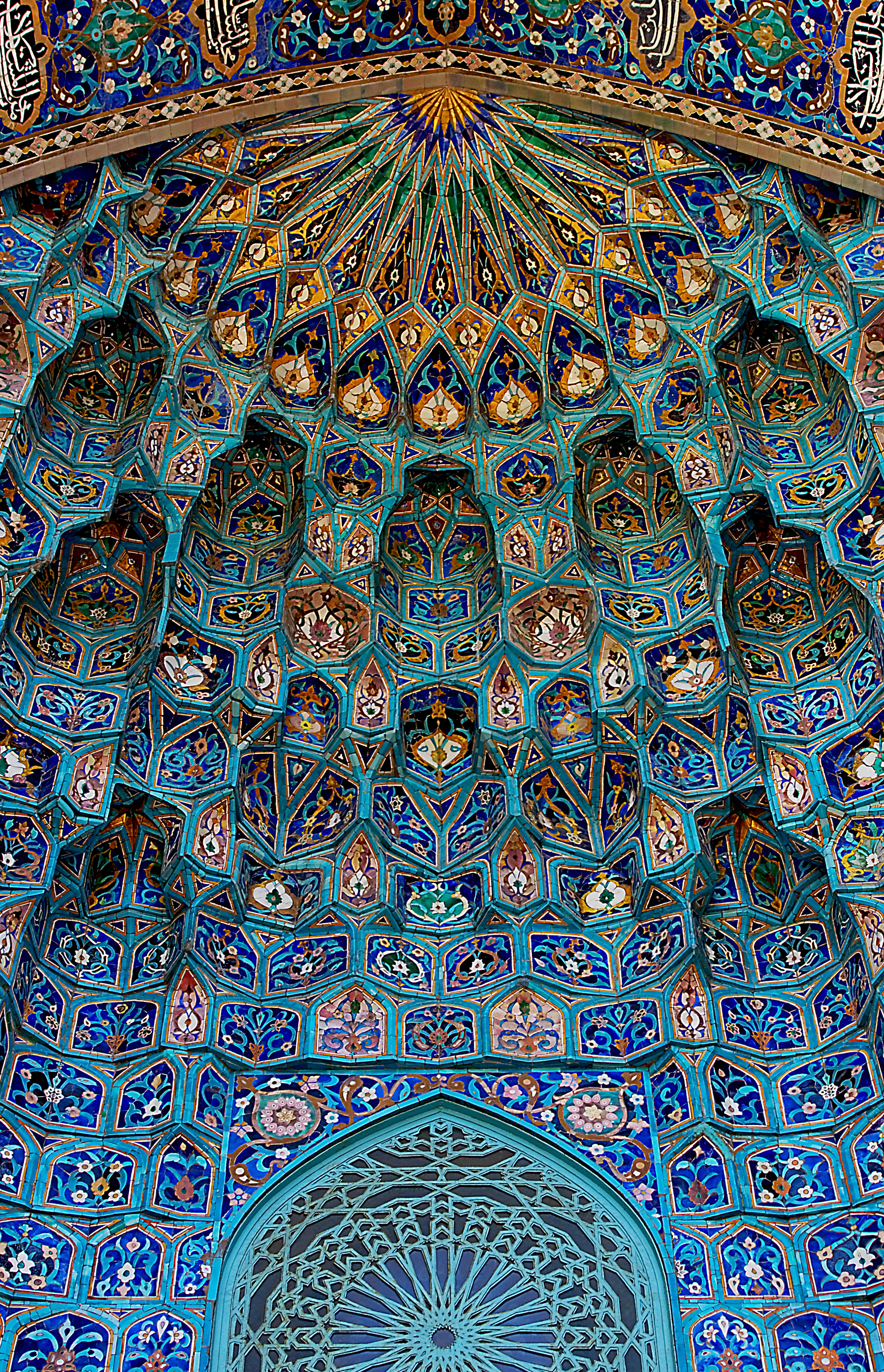
Vaulin's work in the portal of the St Petersburg Mosque

Peter Kuzmich Vaulin (1870–1943) was a Russian ceramics artist active in the first half of the twentieth century

He originally worked in ceramic workshop of Savva Ivanovich Mamontov in the Abramtsevo Colony near Moscow from 1890 to 1904. Then in 1906 set up an industrial workshop in Kikerino, Volosovsky District, Leningrad Oblast in 1906.

Following the Russian Revolution he was appointed commissioner of Lomonosov Porcelain Works in 1918 whilst at the same time being the technical director of Gorn Works, Kikerino, until 1930. He acted as adviser of Proletarian Porcelain Works from 1930.

His major works include:

- the decorative portal of the Institute of Experimental Medicine's library (1911–13)
- a panel on the front of the Zakharov family's apartment house (17 Klinsky Avenue) (1912–13)
- the portal and dome facing of the Saint Petersburg Mosque, (1910–17)

He was a chemical engineer and wrote works on ceramics technology. He also taught at the Myrhorod Art and Design School.

In 1943 he was charged with collusion with fascists and was sent to prison where he died. He was rehabilitated after the Second World War.

== Gallery ==
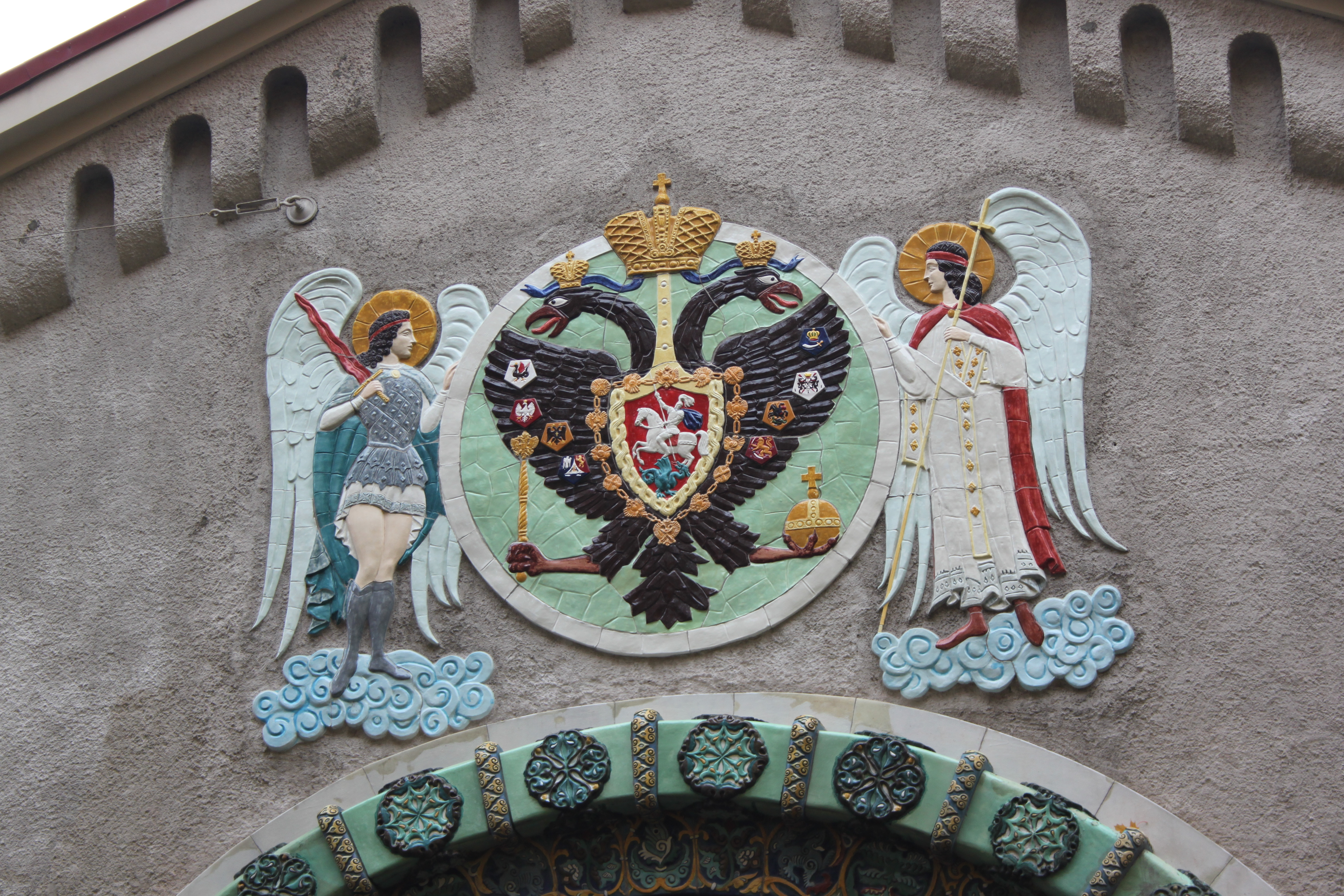
Entrance to the Library, Institute of Experimental Medicine, 2016

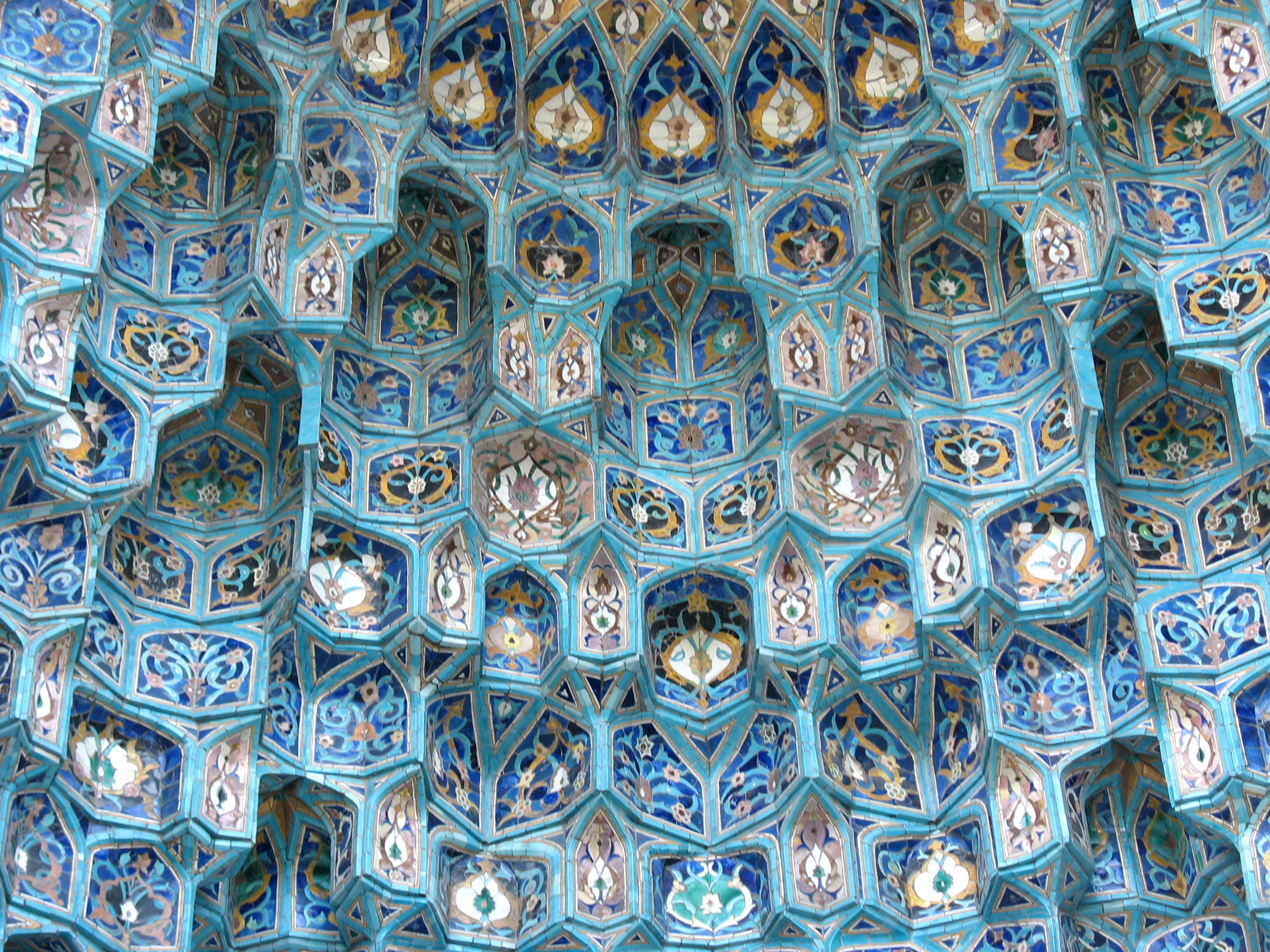
Detail from the St Petersburg Mosque
