= A Dreary Story =

1889 novella by Anton Chekhov

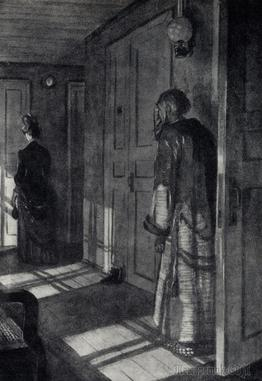
- 1953 illustration by Tatyana Shishmaryova
- Author: Anton Chekhov
- Original title: Скучная история
- Language: Russian
- Publisher: Adolf Marks, 1900
- Publication date: November 12, 1889
- Publication place: Russia

A Dreary Story (Russian: Скучная история, romanized: Skuchnaya istoriya, translated also as "A Boring Story") is an 1889 novella by Anton Chekhov, subtitled "From the Notebooks of an Old Man". Influenced by the death of Chekhov's brother Nikolay from tuberculosis, it has been described as one of Chekhov's most enduring works, and as "a penetrating study into the mind of an elderly and dying professor of medicine".

== Publication ==
A Dreary Story was first published in the November 1889, No.11 issue of Severny Vestnik. According to the autograph, concluding the manuscript, it was "written in the Luka village, Sumsk region, 1889". In a considerably re-worked version the novella was included into a collection called Gloomy People (Хмурые люди, Khmurye lyudi, 1890), then into Volume 5 of Chekhov's Collected Works, published by Adolf Marks in 1899–1901.

== History ==
Chekhov completed the story by the end of September. Still, in his 3 September letter he informed Aleksey Pleshcheyev, then closely associated with Severny Vestnik, that the story was almost ready, but in need of "polishing, varnishing and some additional pondering on". He added: "Never in my life have I written anything of the kind. Such themes are totally new to me, and I am a bit wary of my own inexperience. In other words, I wouldn't like to come up with something stupid."

In a 7 September letter he informed Anna Yevreinova about working upon his new story and the difficulties that he has had, continuously re-shaping it and then re-writing the finale. After the story had been sent to the magazine, in a 24 September letter to Pleshcheyev Chekhov conceded there were fragments in it that might be seen as overdrawn, but warned against cutting seemingly superfluous bits, for they were indispensable for the understanding of the main character. "These long monologues are as fatal and necessary as a heavy gun carriage is for a cannon. They define this character, the mood he's in, his unwillingness to be true with himself," he insisted.

Pleshcheyev wrote a reply which contained a profound analysis of the novella. "This is the deepest, the strongest thing that you've written to date. The old scientist type is brilliant and even those moments when his musings seem to become those of your own, do not spoil the whole picture," he wrote. He advised Chekhov to change the title (which the latter rejected) and expressed doubts about some aspects of the old man's character. Chekhov replied: "The thing about my hero is that he does not care for those around him. People close to him shed tears, make mistakes, tell lies, but all he can do is dispassionately lecture them on theatre or literature."

== Synopsis ==
Nikolai Stepanovich, a luminary in the world of medical science, tormented by insomnia and bouts of devastating weakness, lives in a kind of darkening haze. He tries to analyze the reasons for his rapid physical and psychological decline in the face of unspecified illness and (according to his own premonition), imminent death in the course of the next six months. The world around him feels increasingly alien, and watching his beloved Liza and Katya (daughter and adopted daughter, respectively) suffering, he is unable to emotionally connect with them, being totally disoriented and numbed by problems of his own.

== Critical reception ==
Pleshcheyev in his letter predicted the novella would divide critical opinion (if only for the reason of being rather harsh on Russian intelligentsia) and proved to be right. In the 3 January 1890 edition of Novoye Obozreniye (The New Review, Tiflis, No.2079) Alexander Amfiteatrov called A Dreary Story "undeniably the best work of Russian literature of the last year". But in his large Moskovskiye Vedomosti review Yuri Govorukha-Otrok reviewed the novella negatively and put to doubt Chekhov's reputation as an emerging great writer. Viktor Burenin in Novoye Vremya dismissed the novella as a trivial "etude on the slow decline of an old man's mind".

In Russkoye Bogatstvo critic L. Obolensky (as Sozertsatel) supported the story's alleged leitmotif that "life without some belief in some higher ideal or god is meaningless", but apart from that saw little of value in it. Nikolay Mikhaylovsky, who in his Russkiye Vedomosti review of the Moody People collection (not for the first time) condemned Chekhov's perceived 'aloofness' towards his characters, praised A Dreary Story for a change, as a sign of better things to come and called it "the best and the most significant thing Chekhov had written to date".

Several critics saw A Dreary Story as a mere variation on Lev Tolstoy's "The Death of Ivan Ilyich". "Strange, how such an original writer could have fallen into such a trap of imitation", wrote Aristarkhov in Russkiye Vedomosti. Yet, D. Strunin in the April 1890 issue of Russkoye Bogatstvo praised the novella as a highly original piece of writing, even if Nikolai Stepanovich indeed looked very much like "the Ivan Ilyich in the science world".
