= Lytkin =

Lytkin (Russian: Лыткин), feminine: Lytkina (Russian: Лыткина), is a Russian surname derived from the archaic Russian word lytka, 'leg calf'. Notable people with the surname include:

- Galina Lytkina (1928–2014), Soviet and Russian actress of Komi origin
- Georgy Lytkin (1835–1907), Russian and Soviet Komi writer, historian, enthographer, and educator
- Nikita Lytkin (1993–2021), serial killer from Irkutsk, Russia
- Vasily Lytkin (1895–1981), Soviet Komi poet, translator and linguist
- Vsevolod Lytkin (born 1967), Russian presiding bishop of the Siberian Evangelical Lutheran Church
