= Kikerinsky Rural Settlement =

Kikerinsky Rural Settlement Кикеринское сельское поселение
- Rural Settlement
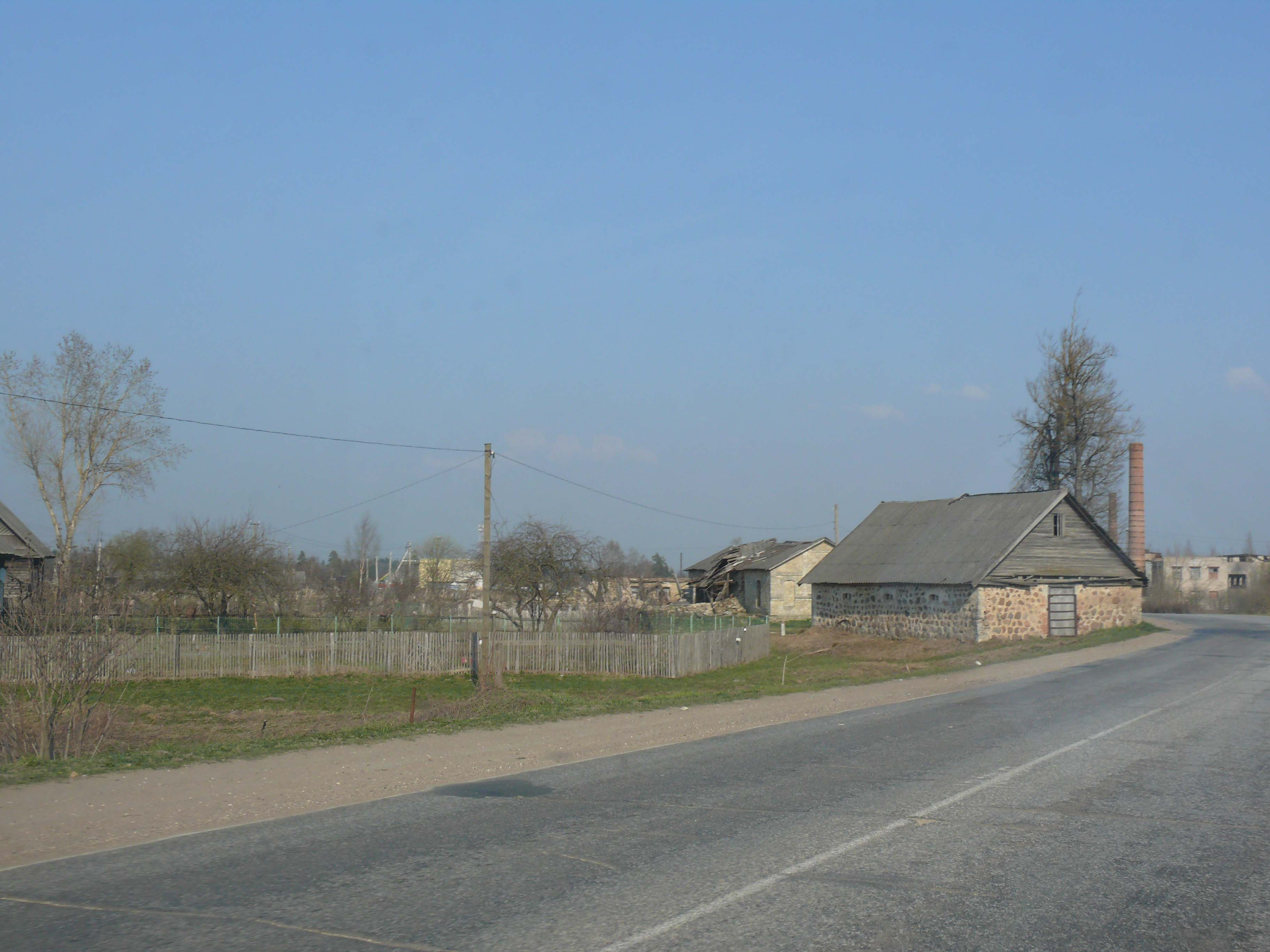

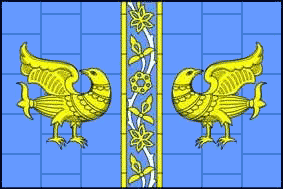
- Flag
- Interactive map of Kikerinsky Rural Settlement
- Location of Kikerinsky Rural Settlement Kikerinsky Rural Settlement (Leningrad Oblast)
- Coordinates: 59°27′50″N 29°37′30″E
- Country: Russia
- Federal subject: Leningrad Oblast
- Founded: 1 January 2006

Area
  - Total: 52 km^{2} (20 sq mi)

Population (2010 Census)
  - Total: 2,471
  - Estimate (2019): 2,489 (+0.7%)
  - Density: 48/km^{2} (120/sq mi)

Municipal status
  - Municipal district: Volosovsky

Kikerinsky Rural Settlement is a rural settlement in the Volosovsky District of the Leningrad Oblast. Kikerino is the administrative centre.

The head of the administration is Kostanyan Igor Razmikovich.
