= SELC =

SELC may refer to:

- SouthEastern Lacrosse Conference, a collegiate lacrosse conference in the Men's Collegiate Lacrosse Association
- Synod of Evangelical Lutheran Churches, an American Lutheran denomination that existed from 1902 to 1971
  - SELC District of the Lutheran Church–Missouri Synod, the district formed by the merger of the Synod of Evangelical Lutheran Churches into the LCMS
- Southern Environmental Law Center, an environmental nonprofit organization operating in the U.S. South
- School of European Languages and Cultures, a teaching institution at the Beijing Foreign Studies University
- Siberian Evangelical Lutheran Church, a Russian Lutheran church founded in 2003
