= Kikerino =

Kikerino Кикерино
- Rural locality

Other transcription(s)
  - Suomi: Kikkeri
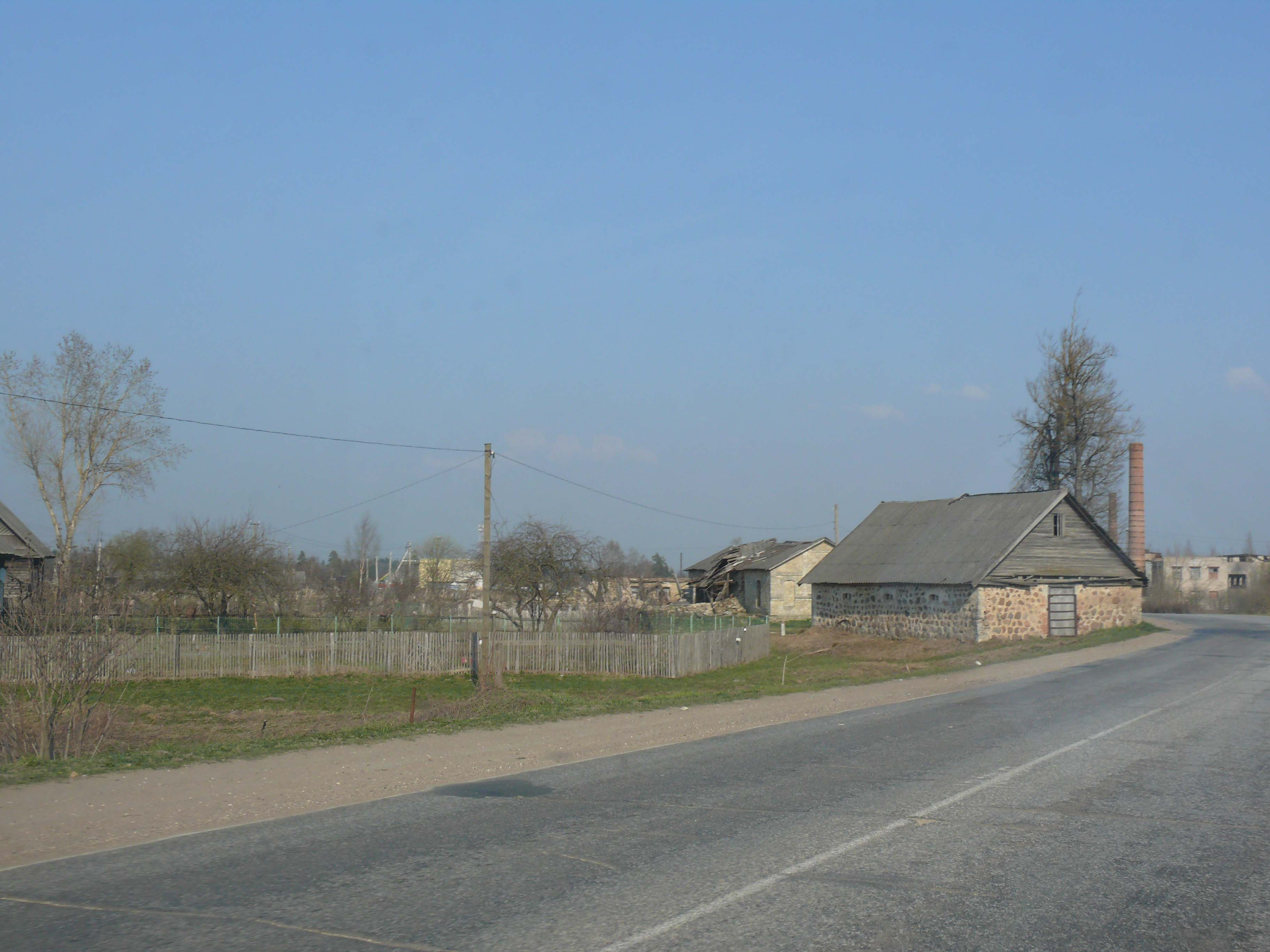
- Interactive map of Kikerino
- Location of Kikerino Kikerino (Leningrad Oblast)
- Coordinates: 59°27′50″N 29°37′30″E
- Country: Russia
- Federal subject: Leningrad Oblast

Population
  - Estimate (2017): 2,067 )

Municipal status
  - Municipal district: Volosovsky
  - Rural settlement: Kikerinsky Rural Settlement
- Time zone: UTC+3 (MSK)
- Postal code: 188400
- OKTMO ID: 41606420123

Kikerino is a village in the Volosovsky District of the Leningrad Oblast. It is the administrative centre of the Kikerinsky Rural Settlement.

Kikerino was an urban-type settlement from April 20, 1930, until this was revoked as part of municipal reforms on 15 July 2004. It lies on the P.38 Gatchina - Volosovo - Opole road.

Peter Vaulin established a ceramic factory here in 1906. It produced Maiolica.
