= Evangelical Lutheran Church of Saint Mary =

Coordinates: 59°56′17″N 30°19′25″E

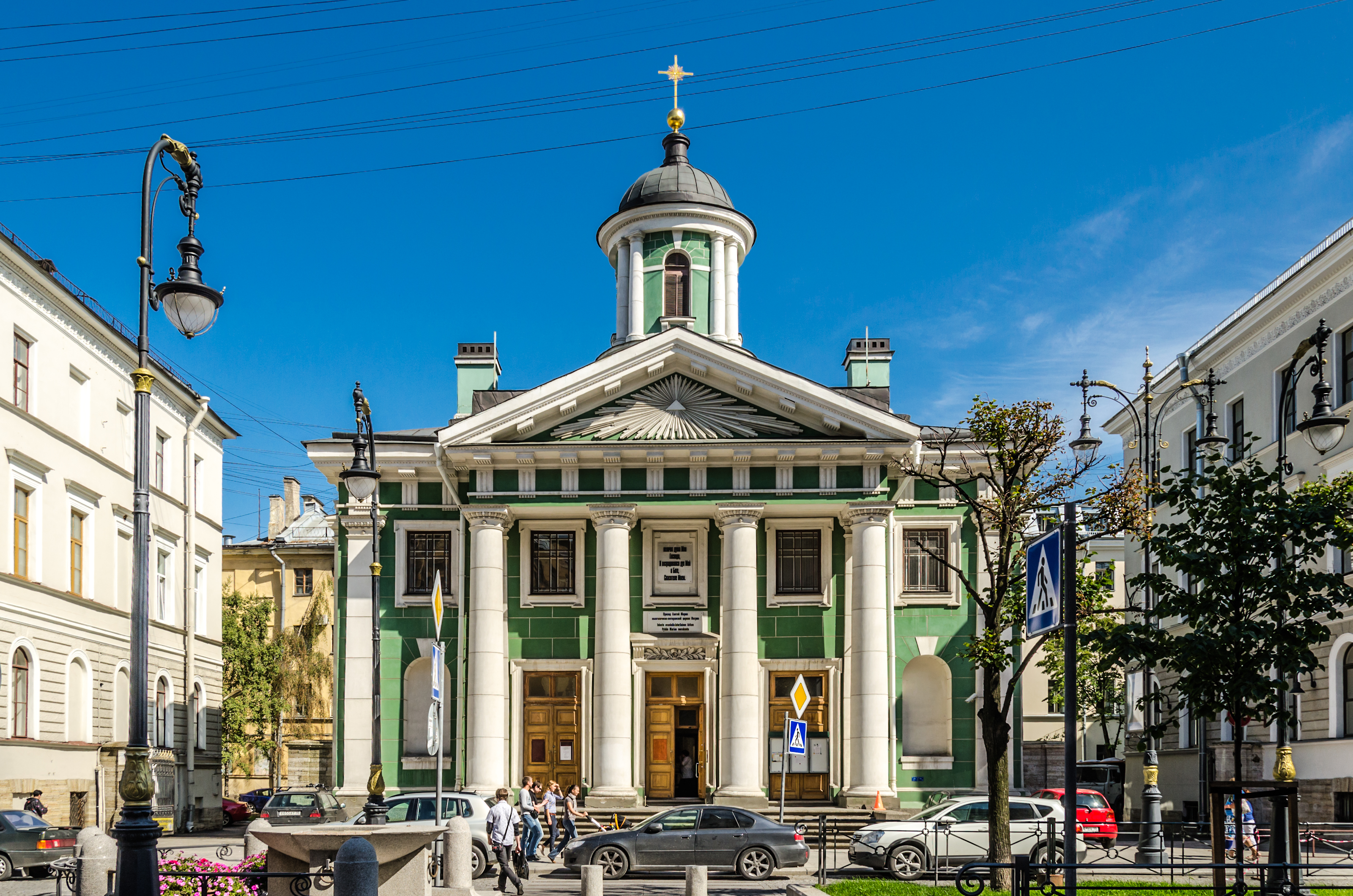
The Evangelical Lutheran Church of Saint Mary

The Evangelical Lutheran Church of Saint Mary (Russian: Евангелическо-лютеранская церковь Святой Марии, Finnish: Pyhän Marian kirkko) is an Evangelical Lutheran church located in Saint Petersburg, Russia. It was built in 1805 and refurbished in 2002. Its address is: Bolshaya Konyushennnaya Ulitsa 8A, off Nevsky Prospekt. It is usually called the Finnish church and is one of the oldest and largest Protestant churches in Russia.

== History ==
In this area of Saint Petersburg, which used to be called "Ingria" by the Finnish and Swedish, the Evangelical Lutheran Church of Ingria has a 400-year history:

- In the early 18th century, many Finnish people participated.in the construction of Saint Petersburg and start building churches as Peter the Great guaranteed the freedom of religion. In 1703, a Swedish-Finnish Evangelical Lutheran church was built and, in 1733, on the land donated by Anna Petrovna, a new church building was constructed, later named the Evangelical Lutheran Church of Saint Anna, which stands now next to the Swedish Consulate General on Malaya Konyushennnaya Street.
- In 1745, the Finnish people of this church went independent and built a wooden church on Bolshaya Konyuushnaya Street. In 1805, a new church was built, designed by Architect Paulsson, named Saint Mary's Church, after Mariya Feodorovna, the mother of the tsar at that time, Alexander I.
- After the annexation of Finland by Russia, the relationship with the Evangelical Lutheran Church of Finland became closer, and, during the early 1890s, the membership of the church reached 17,000.
- As the Russian Revolution of 1917 came, the church went through the most difficult time. In 1938, the church was forced to stop functioning and the church building was first used as a residential space and later as a natural history museum.
- After Perestroika, the church building was returned to the church. Refurbishing of the building started in 1999 and the rededication was celebrated in 2002.

== Church activities ==
Today the church is the largest among the 75 churches of the Church of Ingria, which spread from Russia's west to as far as eastern cities like Irkutsk.

Sunday worship is held at 10:30 in Finnish and at 13:30 in Russian. The church has other activities, such as the Sunday school for children.

== In its neighborhood ==
Near this church on or near Nevsky Prospekt, are:

- Lutheran Church of Saint Peter and Saint Paul (also called the German church)
- Evangelical Lutheran Church of Saint Katarina (also called the Swedish church)

In the latter church, also held are Sunday services in English (Anglican) and in Korean (Presbyterian).

On the opposite side of Nevsky Prospekt is:

- Kazan Cathedral (Eastern Orthodox)

Nearby, also on Nevsky Prospekt, toward east, are:

- Armenian Apostolic Church
- Catholic Church of St. Catherine (Catholic)

== See also ==
- Protestants in Russia
