= Evangelical Lutheran Church in Russia, Ukraine, Kazakhstan and Central Asia =

Religious organisation

Federation of Evangelical Lutheran Churches in Russia and Other States
- Logo of the ELCROS
- Classification: Protestant
- Orientation: Lutheran
- Polity: Episcopal
- Leader: Archbishop Vladimir Provorov
- Associations: LWF, CCE, CPCE
- Full communion: ELCI, SELC
- Region: Former Soviet Union
- Origin: 2015; Astana
- Separations: GELCU
- Congregations: 400
- Members: 20,000 (in 2026)
- Official website: www.elkras.ru

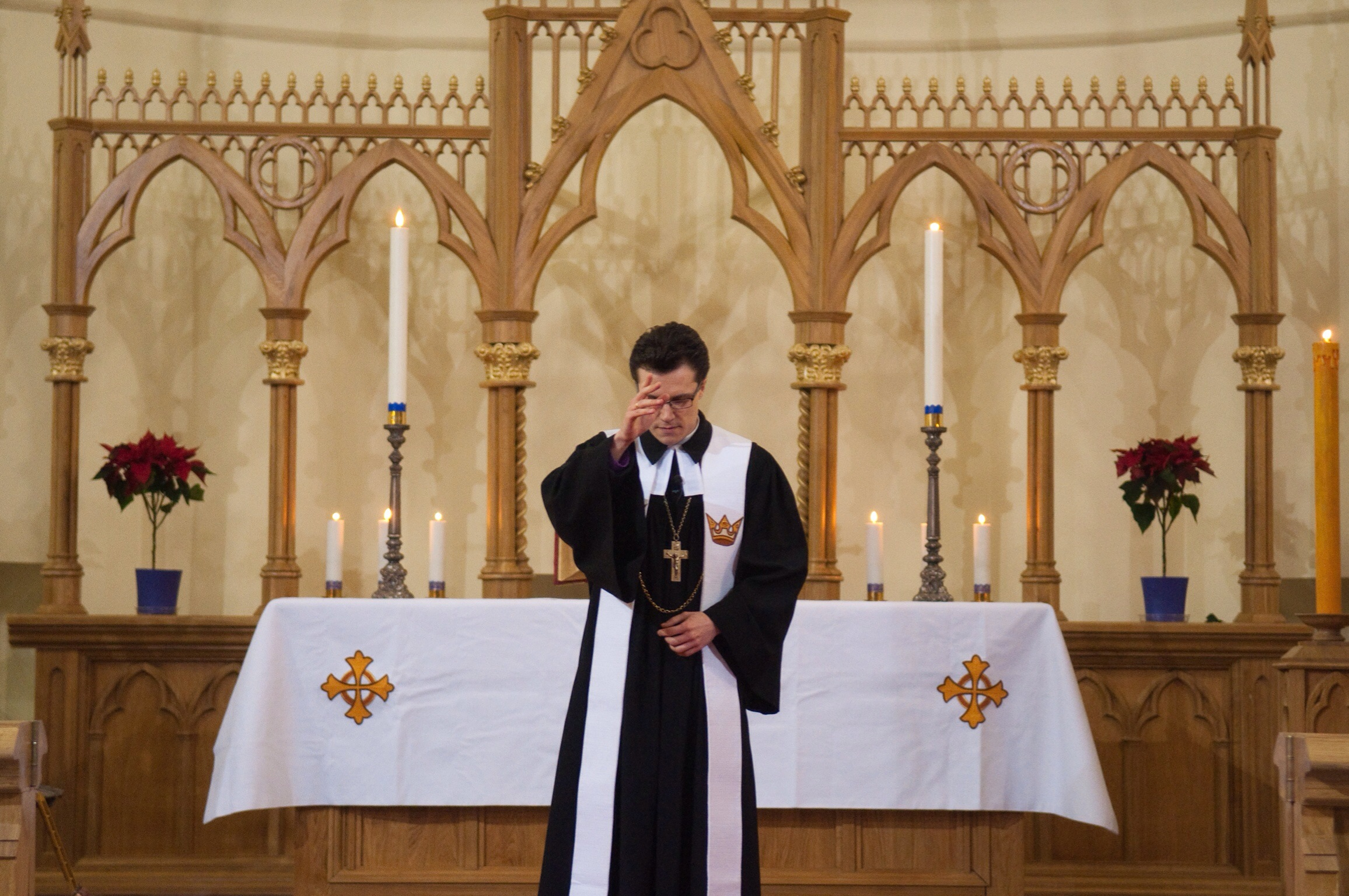
Archbishop Dietrich Brauer giving the blessing at a service in Moscow Lutheran cathedral.

The Federation of Evangelical Lutheran Churches in Russia and Other States (ELCROS) (Russian: Союз Евангелическо-лютеранских церквей), previously the Evangelical Lutheran Church in Russia and the Other States and Evangelical Lutheran Church in Russia, Kazakhstan and Central Asia (Russian: Евангелическо-лютеранская церковь в России, Казахстане и Средней Азии), is a Lutheran denomination that itself comprises regional Lutheran denominations in Belarus, Georgia, Kazakhstan, Kyrgyzstan, Russia, and Uzbekistan as well as individual congregations in Azerbaijan, Tajikistan, and Turkmenistan. Established in its current form in 1999, by 2011, ELCROS had about 24,050 members in more than 400 congregations within its jurisdiction. In 2026, the renamed denomination has 20,000 members.

The constituent dioceses of ELCROS were mostly founded as German Lutheran denominations. The current archbishop of ELCROS is Vladimir Provorov.

In Russia, It involves one of six Lutheran denominations. Though numerically smaller, the Evangelical Lutheran Church of Ingria is present in Russia, as is the Siberian Evangelical Lutheran Church.

== History ==
Lutheranism had established itself in the Teutonic Livonia (modern-day Latvia and Estonia) and Ingria in the early years of the Reformation. Ivan the Terrible invited German artisans and professionals to help modernize institutions in what is now Russia, bringing Lutherans into then Muscovy.

=== Early history ===
The first church consecrated for Lutheran use in Moscow, St. Michael's Church, was completed in 1576. By the end of the 17th century, German Lutherans were spread throughout Russia, primarily among the military garrisons.

As a result of the Great Northern War, the former Swedish provinces of Livonia and Estonia, with their large Lutheran populations, were ceded to Russia. To gain the support of the Baltic nobility, the Lutheran churches were granted freedom of dogma, liturgy and administration by Peter the Great. Catherine the Great's policy of populating frontier areas of the Russian Empire with immigrants further increased the number of German Lutherans in Russia.

Despite the de facto recognition of Lutheranism in Russia, it was still considered a foreign faith, with restrictions on proselytization placed to limit the expansion of the faith to non-Russian nationalities only and secular oversight being placed under the Main Administration for Ecclesiastical Affairs of Foreign Faiths.

=== Official establishment ===
In 1832, de jure recognition was granted to the Lutheran Church and the Evangelical Lutheran Church in Russia (ELCR) (German: Evangelisch Lutherische Kirche in Russland) was established uniting Lutheran and Reformed congregations in the administrative regions of Russia proper, and the Kingdom of Poland with the Czar as the Supreme Bishop. The ELCR was granted the status of a State Church for minorities whose properties and leadership would be funded and salaried by the state.

In 1905, full religious freedom was granted with an edict of toleration and Lutheran churches were finally allowed to conduct services and their liturgy in the Russian language. By 1914, the Lutheran Church in Russia proper itself had grown to include 1,828 congregations comprising 3,660,000 members of various nationalities.

=== The First World War and the early Soviet era ===
With Russia's joining of the First World War on the side of Triple Entente against the German Empire, a policy of mass deportation of the German minorities in Russia was implemented. As a significant number of Russia's Lutherans were German or German-speaking, this severely affected the Lutheran church.

The Russian Revolution of 1917 and the end of the First World War in 1918 also brought tremendous changes to the Lutheran church. The former Russian territories of Estonia, Finland, Latvia, Lithuania, and Poland, with large Lutheran populations, gained independence. In December 1917, schools and seminaries were nationalized; by 1918, this extended to all properties of the church, including church buildings. By 1921, religious instruction to persons under the age of 18 was banned.

The deportation policies of the Tsarist era was continued in some areas, bolstered by the participation of whole German-speaking communities on the side of the White Russians against the Bolsheviks in the Russian Civil War.

In 1924, the remaining clergy of the ELCR met in a General Synod in Moscow to re-organise the church. The reorganised ELCR was put under the supervision of two elected bishops, Arthur Malmgren of Leningrad and Theophil Meyer of Moscow. Despite approval of a new constitution for the Lutheran Church in 1924 by the new Bolshevik government, the collectivization policies of Joseph Stalin in 1928 scattered the population, and official anti-religion campaigns intensified in the 1930s under the authority of the 1929 Law on Religion resulting in the incarceration of pastors in deportation camps and, in some cases, their executions.

In 1936, Bishop Malmgren left Russia for Germany; by 1937, the ELCR had ceased to exist as an organized body.

=== Second World War and the post war period ===
The Second World War brought another upheaval to the Lutheran communities. Mass deportations of Germans from European Russia to Soviet Asia and Siberia occurring prior to the German invasion of Russia had the net result of decimating religious life among the German-speaking Lutherans, as no religious services were allowed in the deportation regions. The only exception was a Lutheran church in Tselinograd that was established by Eugen Bachmann in 1957 and granted registration the same year.

The remaining Lutherans survived the collapse of the ELCR by joining existing Brethren communities (German: Bruedergemeinden), in which leadership and pastoral care was given by laypeople. Such Brethren communities, heavily influenced by Pietism, had been in existence since the 19th century but had managed to survive the persecutions of the Soviet state due to their fluid structure. In 1955, three ELCR pastors who had survived the concentration camps and deportations visited the underground Brethren congregations in the deportation regions in attempts to regularize the administration of the churches, but they were in most cases unsuccessful

The Soviet annexation of the Baltic states in 1944 also brought back a significant Lutheran population and the various Lutheran Churches that were established in these territories were allowed to function with the Evangelical Lutheran Church of Latvia registered in 1940 and the Estonian Evangelical Lutheran Church in 1949, although they, too, were targets of repression and controls.

It was only in the post-Stalin era in the 1960s that Lutheran congregations in the deportation areas were finally allowed to register, with the first two being registered in Siberia in 1965. The Rev. Harald Kalnins from the Evangelical Lutheran Church of Latvia (Riga), sponsored by the Lutheran World Federation, was granted permission to visit them periodically from 1969.

=== Late Soviet and immediate post-Soviet era ===
In 1980, the Evangelical Lutheran Church of Latvia appointed Kalnins as superintendent of the German Lutherans in Russia and, with the advent of Perestroika in the Soviet Union, officially installed as the Bishop in 1988 of the re-organised German Evangelical Lutheran Church in the Soviet Union with the blessings of the Lutheran Archbishop of Riga. This allowed the reorganising of congregations and formal seminary training.

With the dissolution of the Soviet Union in 1991, the church became known as the Evangelical Lutheran Church in Russia and the Other States and between 1992 and 1994, synods were organised in European Russia, Siberia, Ukraine, Kazakhstan, Uzbekistan and Kyrgyzstan. In 1994, the first General Synod was held in St. Petersburg, and Georg Kretschmar was elected to succeed Kalnins as bishop. At the second General Synod in 1999, the title of the Bishop was changed to Archbishop.

=== Contemporary developments ===
With the passing of Russia's 1997 Law on Freedom of Conscience and Religious Associations, the Church was again re-registered in 1999 as the Evangelical Lutheran Church in Russia, Ukraine, Kazakhstan and Central Asia. Despite the German origin of the Lutheran Church in Russia, the demographics had shifted to include an increasing number of other nationalities, with reports of up to 30% of the members in Central Asia being Russians in 2003. A new seminary was also established in 1997 in Novosaratovka near St. Petersburg.

In 2015, in Astana, Kazakhstan, the leaders of national churches have replaced the single church body with forming the Federation of Evangelical Lutheran Churches in Russia and Other States (ELCROS) or Union of Evangelical Lutheran Churches (Russian: Союз Евангелическо-лютеранских церквей (Союз ЕЛЦ)).

== Structure ==
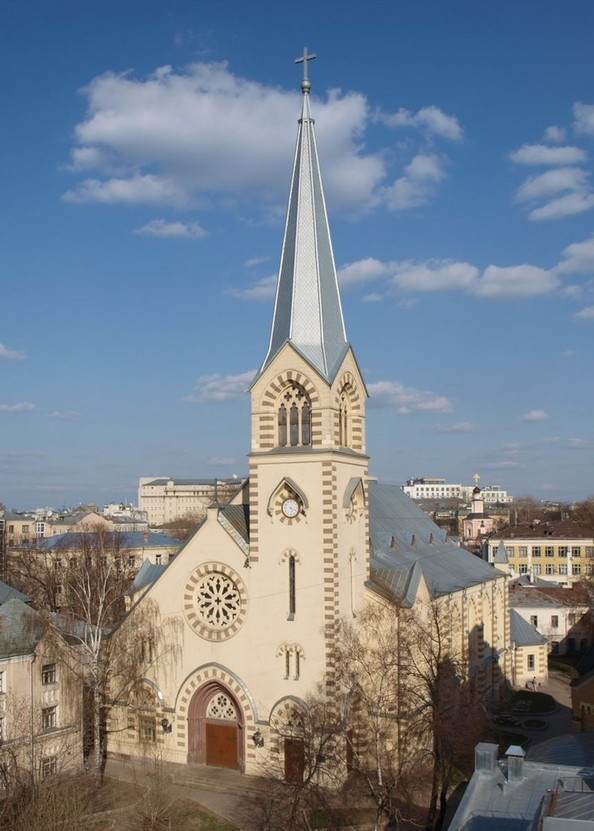
St Peter & St Paul Cathedral, Moscow, is the diocesan cathedral of the Evangelical-Lutheran Church in European Russia, a constituent diocese of ELCROS.

Ecclesiastical authority is vested in the office of the Archbishop, whose nominal seat is the Church of St Peter and St Paul in St Petersburg. The Archbishop and the bishops of the regional Lutheran denominations within ELCROS form an Episcopal Council.

The main governing body of ELCROS is the General Synod, which meets every five years, while executive authority is vested with the Church Synod. The Church Synod is chaired by the General Consistory, headed by the Archbishop, and the Synod further comprises two members from the Episcopal Council and the Presidium of the General Synod.

=== Regional churches ===
The church is further divided into regional Lutheran denominations in Belarus, Georgia, Kazakhstan, Kyrgyzstan, Russia, and Uzbekistan, as well as individual congregations in Azerbaijan, Tajikistan, and Turkmenistan. These were formerly independent churches, and still retain their autonomy, but since 1999 they have been united as constituent dioceses of ELCROS.

- Evangelical Lutheran Church of European Russia (European Russia)
  - Bishop's seat: St Peter and St Paul Cathedral, Moscow
- Evangelical Lutheran Church of the Urals, Siberia and the Far East (Asian Russia)
- Evangelical Lutheran Church in Kazakhstan
- Evangelical Lutheran Church in the Kyrgyz Republic (Kyrgyzstan)
- Evangelical Lutheran Church in Uzbekistan
- Evangelical Lutheran Church in Georgia
- Union of Evangelical Lutheran Church Congregations in Belarus
- Evangelical Lutheran Church in Azerbaijan
- Evangelical Lutheran Church in Dushanbe (Tajikistan)

The German Evangelical Lutheran Church of Ukraine (GELCU) halted participation in ELCROS in April 2024. Its Synod voted to formally leave in November 2024.

=== Archbishop of ELCROS ===
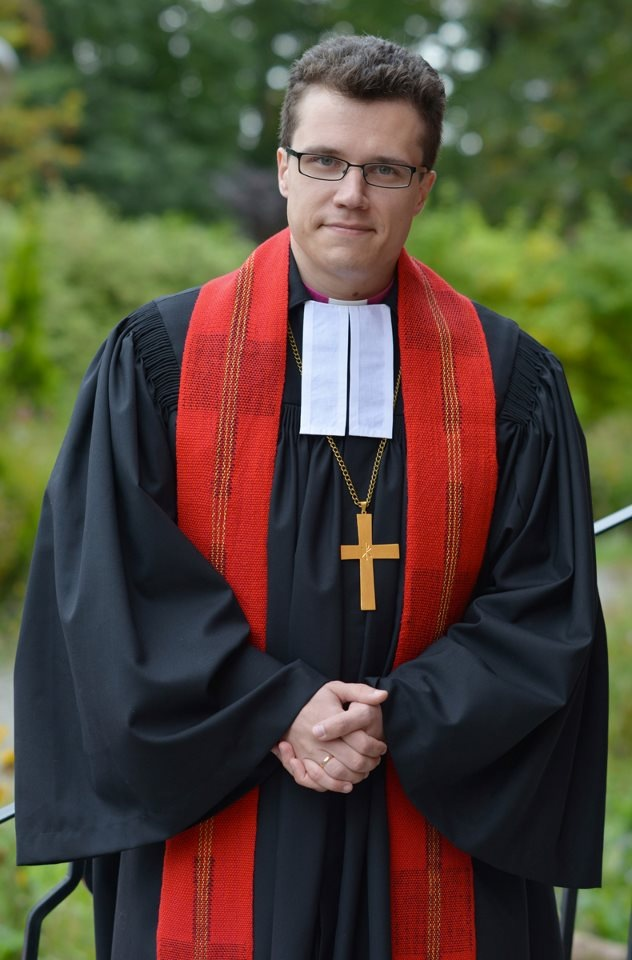
Archbishop Dietrich Brauer, the primate of ELCROS 2012-22.

The Archbishop is the Primate of ELCROS, the chairman of the General Synod, the president of the Episcopal Council, and head of the St Petersburg-based consistory.

Archbishop Dietrich Brauer was both the first native Russian archbishop and a local-born ethnic German, and also the youngest archbishop in ELCROS history. Ordained in the Evangelical-Lutheran Church in European Russia (ELCER), Brauer became a parish pastor in Kaliningrad. On 10 March 2011 he was elected Bishop of the ELCER and installed at the diocesan cathedral in Moscow. Just a year and a half later, on 18 September 2012, and still aged just 29, he was elected Archbishop of ELCROS at the church's General Synod in St Petersburg. He left Russia for Germany in March 2022 and resigned in June 2022.

Senior Bishops (until 1999)

- 1988-1994 - The Rt Rev Harald Kalnins
- 1994-1999 - The Rt Rev Dr Georg Kretschmar

Archbishops (from 1999)

- 1999–2004 - The Rt Rev Dr Georg Kretschmar
- 2004–2009 - The Most Rev Dr Edmund Ratz
- 2009–2012 - The Most Rev August Genrikhovich Kruse
- 2012–2022 - The Most Rev Dietrich Brauer
- 2022–present - Vladimir Provorov

== Affiliations ==
The church participates actively in ecumenical work through its affiliation with the Lutheran World Federation and the Conference of European Churches.

== See also ==
- List of Lutheran dioceses and archdioceses
- Christianity in Azerbaijan
- Christianity in Belarus
- Christianity in Georgia (country)
- Christianity in Kazakhstan
- Christianity in Kyrgyzstan
- Christianity in Tajikistan
- Evangelical Lutheran Church of Ingria
- Protestantism in Russia
- Protestantism in Turkmenistan
- Protestantism in Ukraine
