= Evangelical Lutheran Church of Saint Catherine =

Coordinates: 59°56′19″N 30°19′33″E

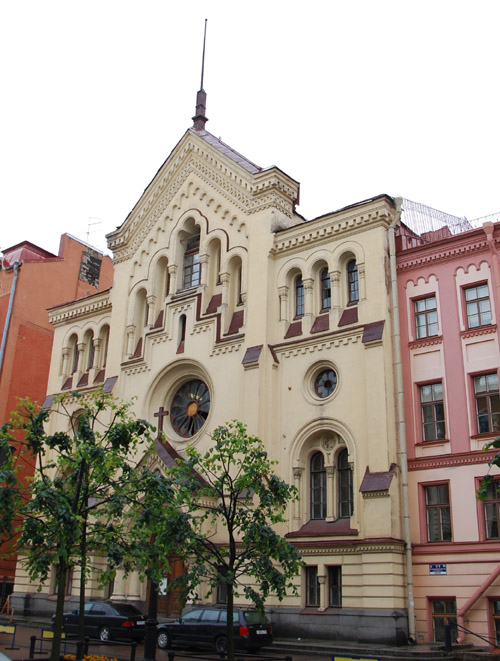
The Evangelical Lutheran Church of Saint Katarina - On the right is the Swedish Consulate General's Building. (July, 2009)

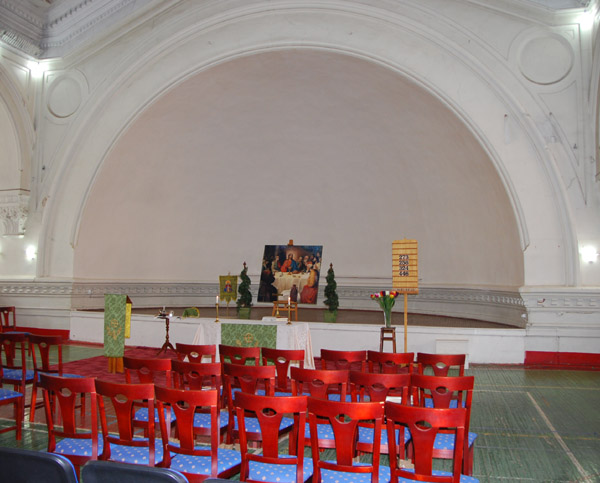
The Evangelical Lutheran Church of Saint Katarina - The Second Floor (July, 2009)

The Evangelical Lutheran Church of Saint Catherine (Swedish: Sankta Katarina kyrka, Finnish: Pyhän Katariinan kirkko, Russian: Евангелическо-лютеранская церковь Святой Екатерины) is an Evangelical Lutheran church located at Malaya Konyushnaya Ulitsa 1 in Saint Petersburg, Russia. The building was built in 1885. As it was built by and for Swedish expatriates in Saint Petersburg, it is usually called the Swedish church. The adjacent building is occupied by the Swedish General Consulate.

== History ==
The church has a 300-year history since the beginning of Saint Petersburg. Many Swedes and Finns worked in Peter the Great's construction of Saint Petersburg. Finland had been a part of Sweden from the early 13th century till 1809 when it became a Duchy of Russia. The Swedish people not only worked as laborers, but also worked in the new Russian government, as Peter the Great is said to have modelled it after the Swedish government.

From 1703, a Swedish-Finnish Evangelical Lutheran church had been organized, and in 1730 a church was built on the land on Malaya Konyushnaya Street, which Anna Petrovna had donated, and was called the Evangelical Lutheran Church of Saint Anna. Next to this land was the Swedish Embassy, now a Swedish General Consulate's office.

In 1745, the Finnish people left the church, became independent and completed a church building on Bolshaya Konyushnaya Street, which later became known as the Evangelical Lutheran Church of Saint Mary. In 1789, the Swedish people built a new church building, which later came to be known as the "Evangelical Lutheran Church of Saint Catherine".

In 1885, the current church building was completed, designed by Carl Andersson (1826–88) who was born in Sweden, but worked in Saint Petersburg. Prominent Swedish families such as those of Immanuel Nobel and Johan Patrik Ljungström belonged to this church. The church membership reached 7,000 at its peak and was 5,000 just before the Russian Revolution of 1917.

During the Soviet time, the church was closed completely in 1936 and was used for basketball and other sports activities. Following the collapse of Soviet power, the building was returned to the church in 1991.

== Worship ==
The Sunday worship is held every second and fourth Sunday from 5:00 pm, in Swedish and Russian. Other church groups use this church for English (Anglican) and Korean (Presbyterian) services.

== Churches in the neighborhood ==
Near this church on or near Nevsky Prospekt, are:

- The Lutheran Church of Saint Peter and Saint Paul (also called the German church)
- The Evangelical Lutheran Church of Saint Mary (also called the Finnish church)

On the opposite side of Nevsky Prospekt is:

- The Kazan Cathedral (Eastern Orthodox)

Nearby, also on Nevsky Prospekt, toward east, are:

- The Armenian Apostolic Church
- The Catholic Church of St. Catherine (Roman Catholic)

== See also ==
- Lutheranism
- Protestants in Russia
