= Volosovo, Ust-Kubinsky District, Vologda Oblast =

Volosovo Волосово
- Village
- Location within Vologda Oblast Location within Russia
- Coordinates: 59°49′N 39°23′E
- Country: Russia
- Region: Vologda Oblast
- District: Ust-Kubinsky District
- Time zone: UTC+3:00

Volosovo (Russian: Волосово) is a rural locality (a village) in Nikolskoye Rural Settlement, Ust-Kubinsky District, Vologda Oblast, Russia. The population was 20 as of 2002.

== Geography ==
Volosovo is located 30 km northwest of Ustye (the district's administrative centre) by road. Syanino is the nearest rural locality.
