= Volosovo, Sobinsky District, Vladimir Oblast =

Volosovo Волосово
- Selo
- Location within Vladimir Oblast Location within Russia
- Coordinates: 56°10′N 40°09′E
- Country: Russia
- Region: Vladimir Oblast
- District: Sobinsky District
- Time zone: UTC+3:00

Volosovo (Russian: Волосово) is a rural locality (a selo) in Tolpukhovskoye Rural Settlement, Sobinsky District, Vladimir Oblast, Russia. The population was 256 as of 2010. There are 6 streets.

== Geography ==
Volosovo is located on the Kolochka River, 30 km northeast of Sobinka (the district's administrative centre) by road. Krutoy Ovrag is the nearest rural locality.
