= Kolbino =

Kolbino Колбино
- Village
- Location within Vologda Oblast Location within Russia
- Coordinates: 59°22′N 39°41′E
- Country: Russia
- Region: Vologda Oblast
- District: Vologodsky District
- Time zone: UTC+3:00

Kolbino (Russian: Колбино) is a rural locality (a village) in Kubenskoye Rural Settlement, Vologodsky District, Vologda Oblast, Russia. The population was 12 as of 2002. There are four streets.

== Geography ==
The distance to Vologda is 39 km, to Kubenskoye is 9 km. Pasynkovo, Belavino, Kolbino, Ivanovskoye, Shatalovo are the nearest rural localities.
