= Volosovo, Petushinsky District, Vladimir Oblast =

Volosovo Волосово
- Village
- Location within Vladimir Oblast Location within Russia
- Coordinates: 55°56′N 39°31′E
- Country: Russia
- Region: Vladimir Oblast
- District: Petushinsky District
- Time zone: UTC+3:00

Volosovo (Russian: Волосово) is a rural locality (a village) in Petushinskoye Rural Settlement, Petushinsky District, Vladimir Oblast, Russia. The population was 30 as of 2010. There are 6 streets.

== Geography ==
Volosovo is located 7 km east of Petushki (the district's administrative centre) by road. Starye Petushki is the nearest rural locality.
