= Siberian Evangelical Lutheran Church =

- Orientation: High Church Lutheranism Lutheran
- Theology: Evangelical Catholic; Confessional
- Polity: Episcopal
- Presiding Bishop: Vsevolod Lytkin
- Associations: International Lutheran Council
- Region: Russia
- Origin: 1992; full independence 2007
- Separated from: Estonian Evangelical Lutheran Church
- Congregations: 25
- Members: 2,100
- Official website: www.lutheran.ru

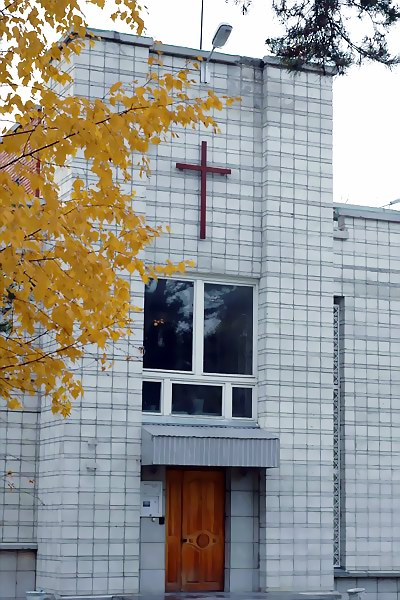
Saint Andrew's Cathedral, Novosibirsk

The Siberian Evangelical Lutheran Church (Russian: Сибирская Евангелическо-Лютеранская Церковь) is a conservative Lutheran denomination that operates in Novosibirsk, Russia.

It is one of six Lutheran denominations in Russia.

The church originally grew out of evangelistic efforts by their first bishop Vsevolod Lytkin, who began preaching Christianity in Novosibirsk in the early 1990s. The church was previously affiliated with the Church of Estonia as the 'West Siberian Christian Mission' until it gained administrative autonomy in 2003. On May 6, 2007 Vsevolod Lytkin was consecrated as Presiding Bishop of the SELC by Archbishop Andres Poder along with Jānis Vanags, Kuna Pajula, Mindaugas Sabutis, and Einar Soone in a ceremony at St. Mary's Cathedral, thus granting the SELC full autonomy from the EELC.

The SELC participates in the International Lutheran Council and is in full communion with the Lutheran Church Missouri Synod. SELC also has links to the ELCROS and ELCI churches.

SELC runs the Novosibirsk Lutheran Theological Seminary.

== See also ==
- Evangelical Lutheran Church of Ingria
- Evangelical Lutheran Church in Russia, Ukraine, Kazakhstan and Central Asia
