= Sumsk (air base) =

- IATA: none; ICAO: XLLM

Summary
- Airport type: Military
- Operator: Soviet Air Force(?)
- Location: Volosovo
- Elevation AMSL: 299 ft / 91 m
- Coordinates: 59°18′18″N 029°5′48″E
- Interactive map of Sumsk

Sumsk is an air base in Leningrad Oblast, Russia located 28 km southwest of Volosovo. It is an abandoned 1960s-era airfield, listed as a major aerodrome on a 1974 Department of Defense Global Navigation Chart No. 3 as having jet facilities. The geometrics now barely visible on Google Earth.
