= Tiit Salumäe =

Estonian Bishop

The Right Reverend Tiit Salumäe
- Bishop of the Western and Northern Region
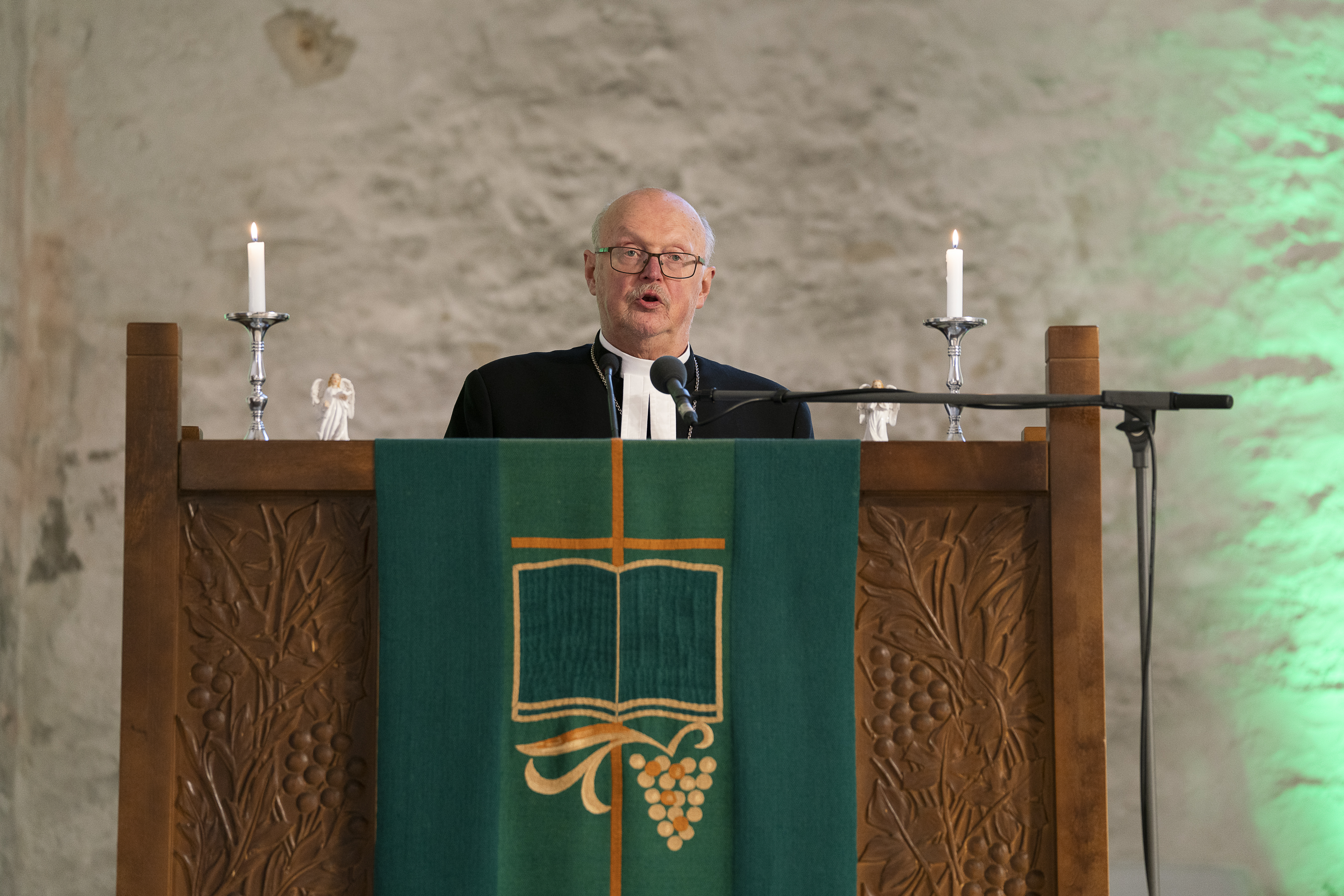
- Church: Estonian Evangelical Lutheran Church
- Diocese: Western and Northern Region
- Elected: 13 January 2015
- In office: 2015–present

Orders
- Ordination: 5 October 1975 by Alfred Tooming
- Consecration: 23 April 2015 by Urmas Viilma

Personal details
- Born: 25 December 1951 (age 74) Tartu, Estonia
- Denomination: Lutheran
- Spouse: Lia Salumäe
- Children: 5

Tiit Salumäe (born 25 December 1951 in Tartu) is an Estonian prelate who is the current bishop of the Western and Northern Region in Estonia, whose episcopal seat is in Haapsalu.

== Biography ==
At the age of 14, Salumäe began his studies at the Church Music Department of the Institute of Theology of the Estonian Evangelical Lutheran Church (1965–1975). After graduating from Loksa Secondary School in 1970, he studied theology at the Institute of Theology of the Estonian Evangelical Lutheran Church.

Salumäe served as a preacher for his father's congregations of Kuusalu, Lees and Loksa. He was ordained priest on 5 October 1975 and was appointed pastor of the Haapsalu congregation. From 1974 to 1988, Salumäe worked as the head of the Library of the Consortium of the EELC and later as the head of the Consortium's Publishing and Press Department. He was also involved in areas such as liturgy, church music, media, architecture and artistic values, information technology, and foreign relations over the last ten years. He also represented the Estonian church in several international organisations, conferences and meetings.

For many years, he has been the representative of the Estonian Evangelical Lutheran Church in the Estonian Council of Churches, and is very close to the inter-ecumenical ties between Estonia and different countries. Salumäe co-ordinates the broadcasting of television and radio services in cooperation with Estonian Public Broadcasting (ERR). Since 1991, he has been chairman of the Estonian Bible Society. Salumäe is also a member of the Joint Committee of the Republic of Estonia and the EELC. The work of Salumäe in the cooperation committees between the state and the church has helped to celebrate the important anniversaries for the state and the church.

In 2015 he was elected Bishop of the Western and Northern Region and was consecrated on 23 April 2015 by Archbishop Urmas Viilma. The President of the Republic Arnold Rüütel has awarded him the Order of the White Star, 3rd Class, in 2001. He has been awarded the Haapsalu City Coat of Arms (2002) and the Läänemaa Order of Merit (2013).

Tiit Salumäe is married to Lia Salumäe. They have twin daughters Maria and Mirjam (1976), Lydia (1977), Lea (1978) and Tiit (1991).
