= Volosovo, Volosovsky District, Leningrad Oblast =

Town in Leningrad Oblast, Russia

Volosovo Волосово
- Town
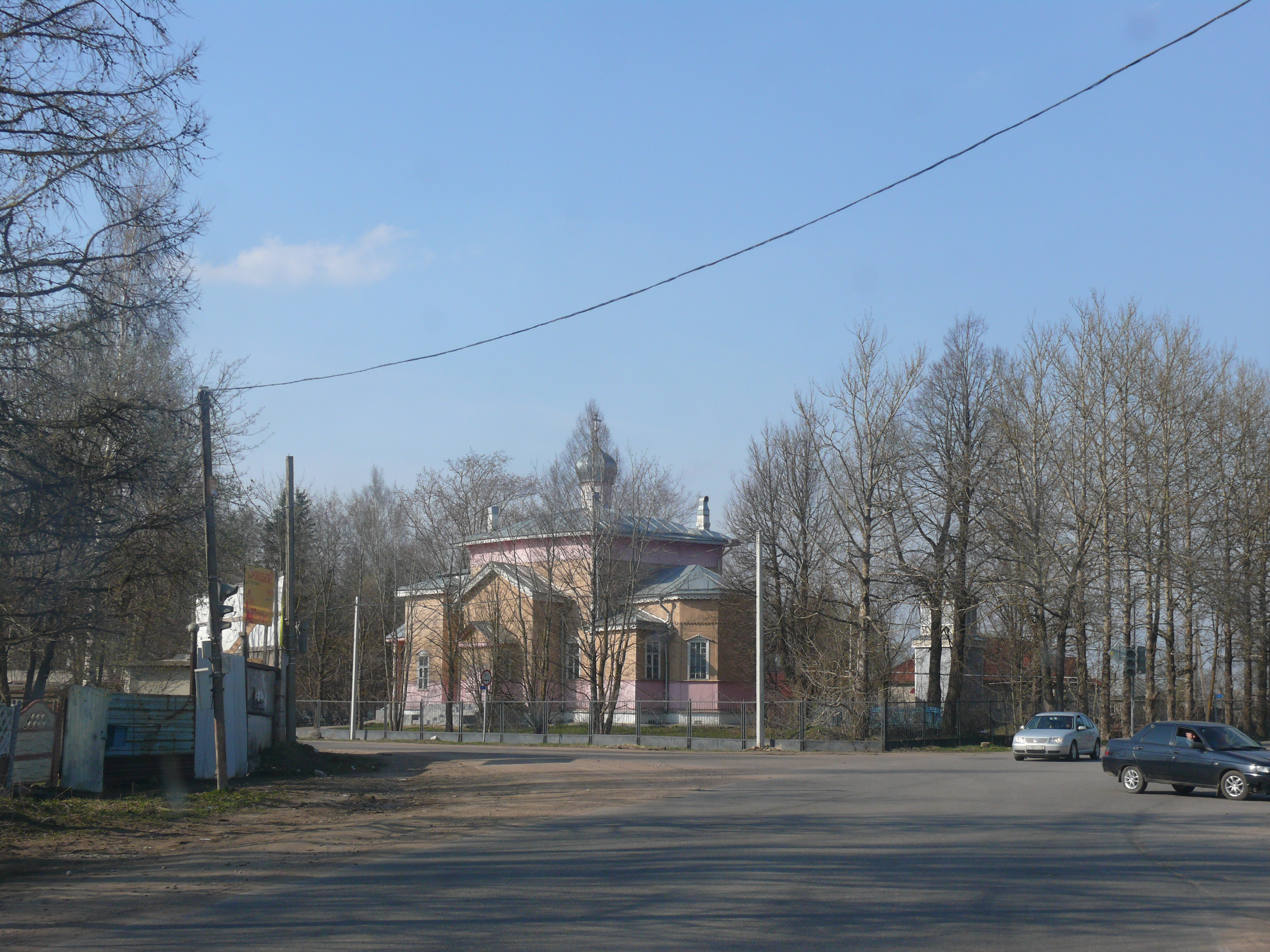

- Flag Coat of arms
- Interactive map of Volosovo
- Location of Volosovo Volosovo (Leningrad Oblast)
- Coordinates: 59°26′N 29°29′E
- Country: Russia
- Federal subject: Leningrad Oblast
- Administrative district: Volosovsky District
- Settlement municipal formationSelsoviet: Volosovskoye Settlement Municipal Formation
- Founded: 1870
- Town status since: 1999
- Elevation: 135 m (443 ft)

Population (2010 Census)
  - Total: 12,161
  - Estimate (2024): 11,433 (−6%)

Administrative status
  - Capital of: Volosovsky District, Volosovskoye Settlement Municipal Formation

Municipal status
  - Municipal district: Volosovsky Municipal District
  - Urban settlement: Volosovskoye Urban Settlement
  - Capital of: Volosovsky Municipal District, Volosovskoye Urban Settlement
- Time zone: UTC+3 (MSK)
- Postal codes: 187844, 188410, 188449
- OKTMO ID: 41606101001
- Website: volosovo-gorod.ru

Volosovo (Russian: Во́лосово) is a town and the administrative center of Volosovsky District in Leningrad Oblast, Russia, located on the railway between St. Petersburg and Tallinn, Estonia, 85 kilometers (53 mi) southwest from St. Petersburg. Population: 12,161 (2010 census); 11,660 (2002 census); 10,250 (1989 Soviet census).

== History ==
It was founded in 1870 as a settlement around the railway station on the railway connecting St. Petersburg and Revel. The name originates from the nearby village of Volosovo. Volosovo was a part of Petergofsky Uyezd of St. Petersburg Governorate). On February 14, 1923, Petergofsky Uyezd was merged with Detskoselsky Uyezd to form Gatchinsky Uyezd, with the administrative center located in Gatchina. On the same day, Gatchina was renamed Trotsk and Gatchinsky Uyezd was renamed Trotsky Uyezd, after Leon Trotsky.

On August 1, 1927, the uyezds were abolished and Volosovsky District, with the administrative center in the settlement of Volosovo, was established. The governorates were also abolished and the district became a part of Leningrad Okrug of Leningrad Oblast. On April 20, 1930, Volosovo was granted suburban settlement status. On July 5, 1937, its status was changed to work settlement.

Between August 1941 and January 1944, during World War II, Volosovo was occupied by German troops. The Germans operated the Dulag 102 prisoner-of-war camp in the settlement, following its relocation from Rakvere in German-occupied Estonia. There were very poor conditions in the camp, with the POWs subjected to food shortages, overcrowding, lack of medical care and harassment, which led to a high mortality rate. Jews and Communists were executed by the Sicherheitsdienst.

On February 1, 1963, Volosovsky District was abolished and merged into Kingiseppsky District; on January 13, 1965, however, it was re-established. It had remained the last district of Leningrad Oblast the administrative center of which was not a town; this changed on April 14, 1999 when town status was granted to Volosovo. During the Soviet period it was a developed industrial town.

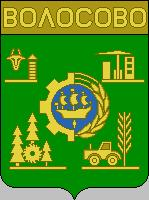
Coat of arms of Volosovo until 2007

== Administrative and municipal status ==
Within the framework of administrative divisions, Volosovo serves as the administrative center of Volosovsky District. As an administrative division, it is, together with the village of Lagonovo, incorporated within Volosovsky District as Volosovskoye Settlement Municipal Formation. As a municipal division, Volosovskoye Settlement Municipal Formation is incorporated within Volosovsky Municipal District as Volosovskoye Urban Settlement.

== Economy ==
=== Industry ===
There are enterprises of food and timber industries in Volosovo.

On June 6, 2024 the Novotrans holding company and the Leningrad oblast administration signed an agreement to invest 4.9 billion rubles in the production of hopper and gondola cars based in Volosovo.

=== Transportation ===
Volosovo has a railway station on the railway connecting St. Petersburg (Baltiysky railway station) with Tallinn via Narva.

The town has access to the A180 Highway, which connects St. Petersburg and Ivangorod and runs north of Volosovo. It coincides with the European route E20 connecting St. Petersburg via Tallinn with Shannon Airport. Volosovo is also connected by roads with Gatchina and Kingisepp. There are local roads as well.

=== Military ===
Southwest of Volosovo was the Sumsk air base facility, which saw some use during the Cold War.

== Culture and recreation ==
Volosovo contains one object classified as cultural and historical heritage of local significance. This is a mass grave of Red Army soldiers killed during the Civil War in Russia and during World War II.

== Notable residents ==
- Pavel Molchanov (1893–1941), meteorologist
