= Vsevolod Lytkin =

Vsevolod Yuryevich Lytkin (Russian: Всеволод Юрьевич Лыткин; born 17 January 1967, in Siberia), has since 2005 served as a bishop in the Siberian Evangelical Lutheran Church (SELC), and since 2007 has headed that denomination.

After encountering Lutherans in Soviet-era Estonia, Lytkin's church career began with his 1987 baptism according to the Lutheran rite in Tallinn, Estonia. After 1991, he began preaching Christianity according to the Lutheran tradition in Akademgorodok, a suburb of Novosibirsk, Siberia. He later created additional Lutheran communities in Khakassia, Buryatia, Tomsk, Omsk, Irkutsk, Kemerovo, Sverdlovsk and Chita, as well as in the Krasnoyarsk territory.

The following year, the Lutheran Church–Missouri Synod (LCMS), a conservative Lutheran denomination in the United States, began to actively support Lytkin's missionary efforts.

In 1993 the Estonian Evangelical Lutheran Church (EELC) recognized Lytkin and his Novosibirsk Lutheran community as part of the EELC, a semi-independent missionary unit directly subordinate to the EELC's Archbishop Jaan Kiivit, Jr. and with its clergy receiving ordination from the Estonian church body.

In May 2003, however, the Siberian Evangelical Lutheran Church, founded and headed by Vsevolod Lytkin, became independent from the Estonian Evangelical Lutheran Church. In 2005, SELC elected Lytkin as its bishop. Being not yet ordained, however, he was known as bishop-elect until 2007, when his official ordination took place.

Since 2024, he has also been responsible for the Holy Family Lutheran Chapel, a mission that brings together traditional High Church Lutherans in Brazil. The chapel is located in the city of Manhumirim, in the state of Minas Gerais.
