= Volosovsky District =

Volosovsky District Волосовский район (Russian)
- District
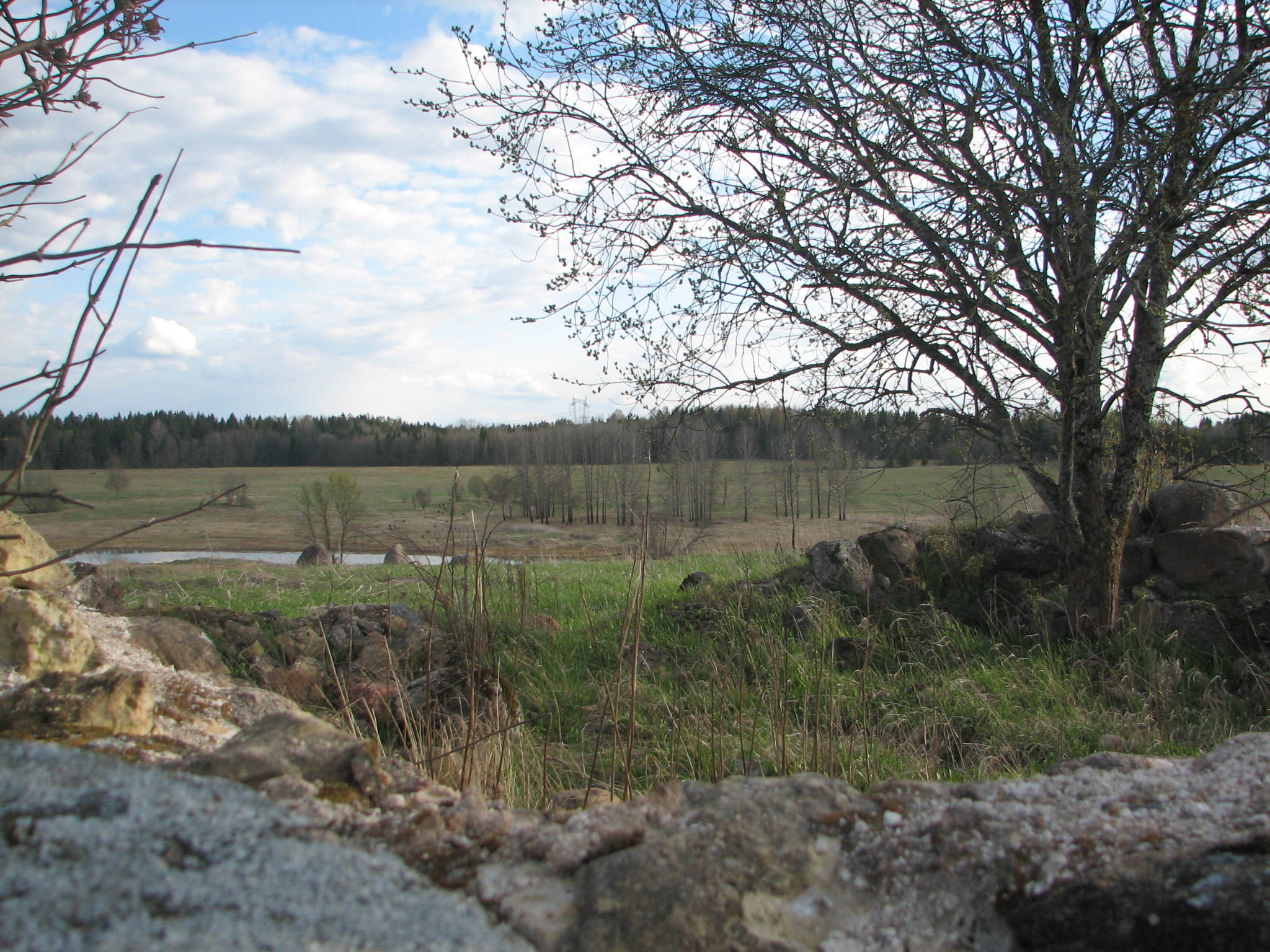
- Khyulgyuzi area in Volosovsky District

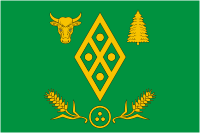
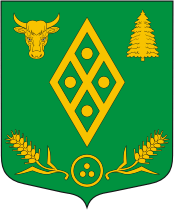
- Flag Coat of arms
- Location of Volosovsky District in Leningrad Oblast
- Coordinates: 59°27′N 29°29′E
- Country: Russia
- Federal subject: Leningrad Oblast
- Established: August 1, 1927
- Administrative center: Volosovo

Area
  - Total: 2,700 km^{2} (1,000 sq mi)

Population (2010 Census)
  - Total: 49,443
  - Density: 18/km^{2} (47/sq mi)
  - Urban: 24.6%
  - Rural: 75.4%

Administrative structure
  - Administrative divisions: 15 settlement municipal formation
  - Inhabited localities: 1 cities/towns, 202 rural localities

Municipal structure
  - Municipally incorporated as: Volosovsky Municipal District
  - Municipal divisions: 1 urban settlements, 15 rural settlements
- Time zone: UTC+3 (MSK)
- OKTMO ID: 41606000
- Website: https://волосовскийрайон.рф/

Volosovsky District (Russian: Во́лосовский райо́н) is an administrative and municipal district (raion), one of the seventeen in Leningrad Oblast, Russia. It is located in the southwest of the oblast with Lomonosovsky District in the north, Gatchinsky District in the east, Luzhsky District in the south, Slantsevsky District in the southwest, and Kingiseppsky District in the northwest. The area of the district is 2,700 square kilometers (1,000 sq mi). Its administrative center is the town of Volosovo. Population: 49,443 (2010 census); 48,128 (2002 Census); 46,908 (1989 Soviet census). The population of Volosovo accounts for 24.6% of the district's total population.

== Geography ==
The area of the district is basically flat. Much of the area belongs to the drainage basin of the Luga River. The Luga itself forms the southern border of the district. Rivers in the minor areas in the north of the district drain into other tributaries of the Gulf of Finland. The biggest such tributary in the area of the district is the Sista.

== History ==
Originally, the area of the district was populated by Finnic peoples, eventually, the Slavs began arriving. After the 9th century, the area was dependent on the Novgorod Republic. From the 15th century, it was annexed together with all Novgorod Lands by the Grand Duchy of Moscow; it belonged to the Vodskaya pyatina, one of the five pyatinas of Novgorod Lands. The area was constantly at the frontier and became the battleground between Germans and Swedes, on one side, and Russians, on the other side. In 1617, according to the Treaty of Stolbovo, the west of the area was transferred to Sweden, and in 1703, during the Great Northern War, it was conquered back by Russia.

In the course of the administrative reform carried out in 1708 by Peter the Great, the area was included into Ingermanland Governorate (known since 1710 as Saint Petersburg Governorate). It was later split between Yamburgsky and Petergofsky Uyezds. The governorate was renamed Petrograd in 1914 and Leningrad in 1924. In May 1922, Yamburgsky Uyezd was renamed Kingiseppsky. On February 14, 1923 Petergofsky Uyezd was merged with Detskoselsky Uyezd to form Gatchinsky Uyezd, with the administrative center located in Gatchina. On February 14, 1923 Gatchina was renamed Trotsk, and Gatchinsky Uyezd was renamed Trotsky Uyezd, after Leon Trotsky.

On August 1, 1927, the uyezds were abolished and Volosovsky District, with the administrative center in the settlement of Volosovo, was established. The governorates were also abolished, and the district was a part of Leningrad Okrug of Leningrad Oblast. It included parts of former Trotsky and Kingiseppsky Uyezds. On April 20, 1930 Kikerino was granted urban-type settlement status, and Volosovo became a suburban settlement. On July 23, 1930, the okrugs were abolished as well, and the districts were directly subordinated to the oblast. On July 5, 1937 Volosovo was made an urban-type settlement. Between August 1941 and January 1944, during World War II, the district was occupied by German troops. On February 1, 1963 Volosovsky District was abolished and merged into Kingiseppsky District; on January 13, 1965 it was reestablished. It remained the last district of Leningrad Oblast with the administrative center not having the town status until April 14, 1999, when Volosovo was granted town status. On June 29, 2004 Kikerino was downgraded to a rural locality.

On August 1, 1927 Osminsky District with the administrative center in the selo of Osmino was established as well. It was a part of Luga Okrug of Leningrad Oblast. It included areas which were previously parts of Gdovsky, Luzhsky, and Kingiseppsky Uyezds. On July 23, 1930, the okrugs were abolished, and the districts were directly subordinated to the oblast. Between March 22, 1935 and September 19, 1940, Osminsky District was a part of Kingisepp Okrug of Leningrad Oblast, one of the okrugs abutting the state boundaries of the Soviet Union. Between August 1941, and February 1944, Osminsky District was occupied by German troops. On August 2, 1961 Osminsky District was abolished and split between Slantsevsky and Volosovsky Districts. After the abortive administrative reform of the 1960s, its territory became split between Slantsevsky, Volosovsky, Luzhsky, and Kingiseppsky Districts.

Another district created on August 1, 1927 was Moloskovitsky District with the administrative center in the village of Moloskovitsy. It was a part of Leningrad Okrug of Leningrad Oblast and included areas which were previously part of Kingiseppsky Uyezd. On September 20, 1931 Moloskovitsky District was abolished and merged into Volosovsky District.

== Economy ==
=== Industry ===
Timber industry is an important branch of economy of the district. Additionally, there are a limestone plant and a road metal plant, as well as the Gorn porcelain and ceramic works, a dairy mill, and Russia's leading mixed feed mill — the Agrofirma Volosovo.

=== Agriculture ===
The main agricultural specializations of the district are dairy farming, potato growing, and perennial herbs seed production.

=== Transportation ===
The railway connecting Saint Petersburg (Baltiysky railway station) with Tallinn via Narva crosses the district from east to west. The principal stations within the district are Volosovo and Kikerino.

The A180 highway, connecting Saint Petersburg and Ivangorod, crosses the northern part of the district. It coincides with the European route E20 connecting Saint Petersburg via Tallinn with Shannon Airport. Volosovo has access to M11, and is also connected by roads with Gatchina and Kingisepp. There are local roads as well.

== Culture and recreation ==
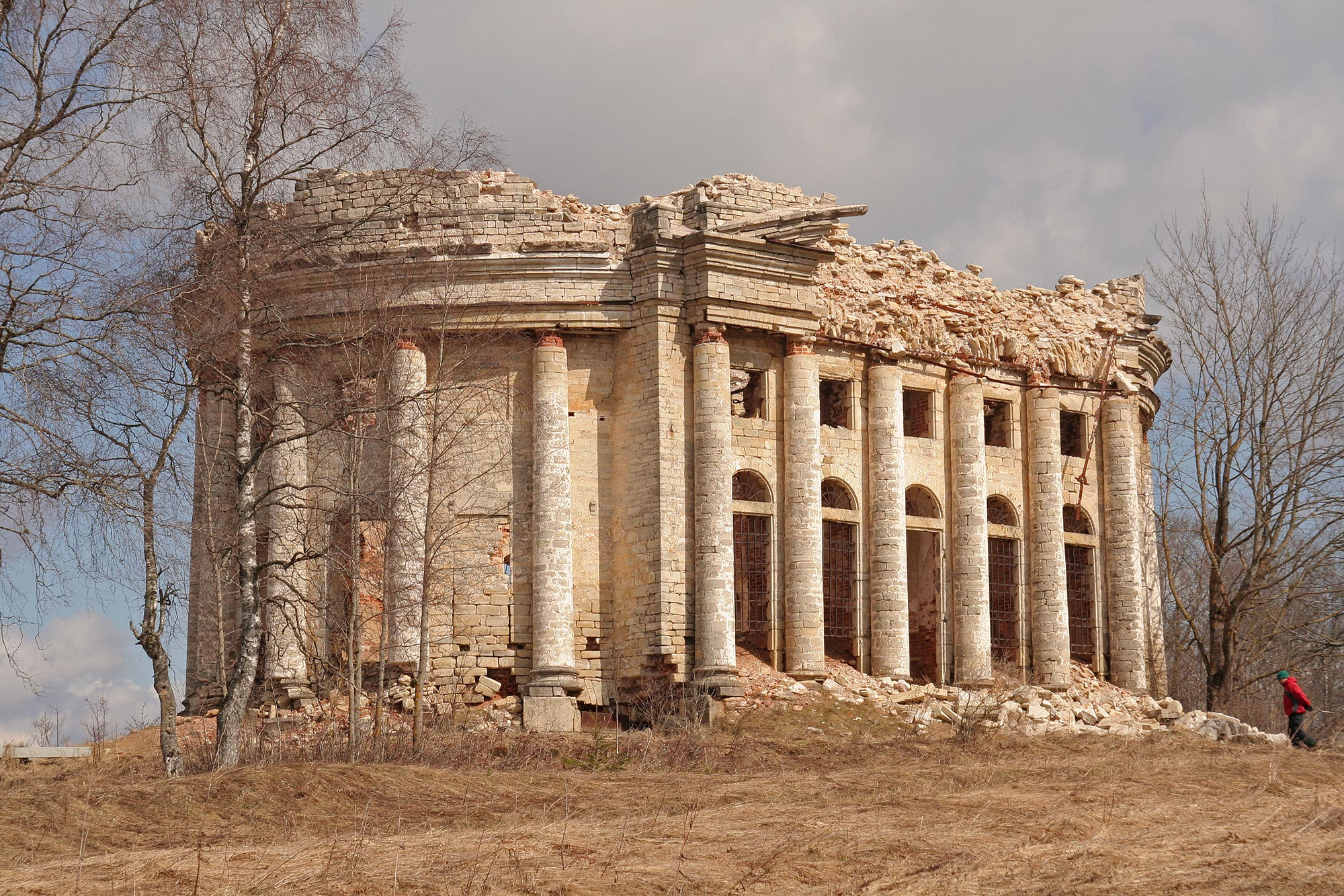
Ruins of the Trinity Church close to the village of Pyataya Gora

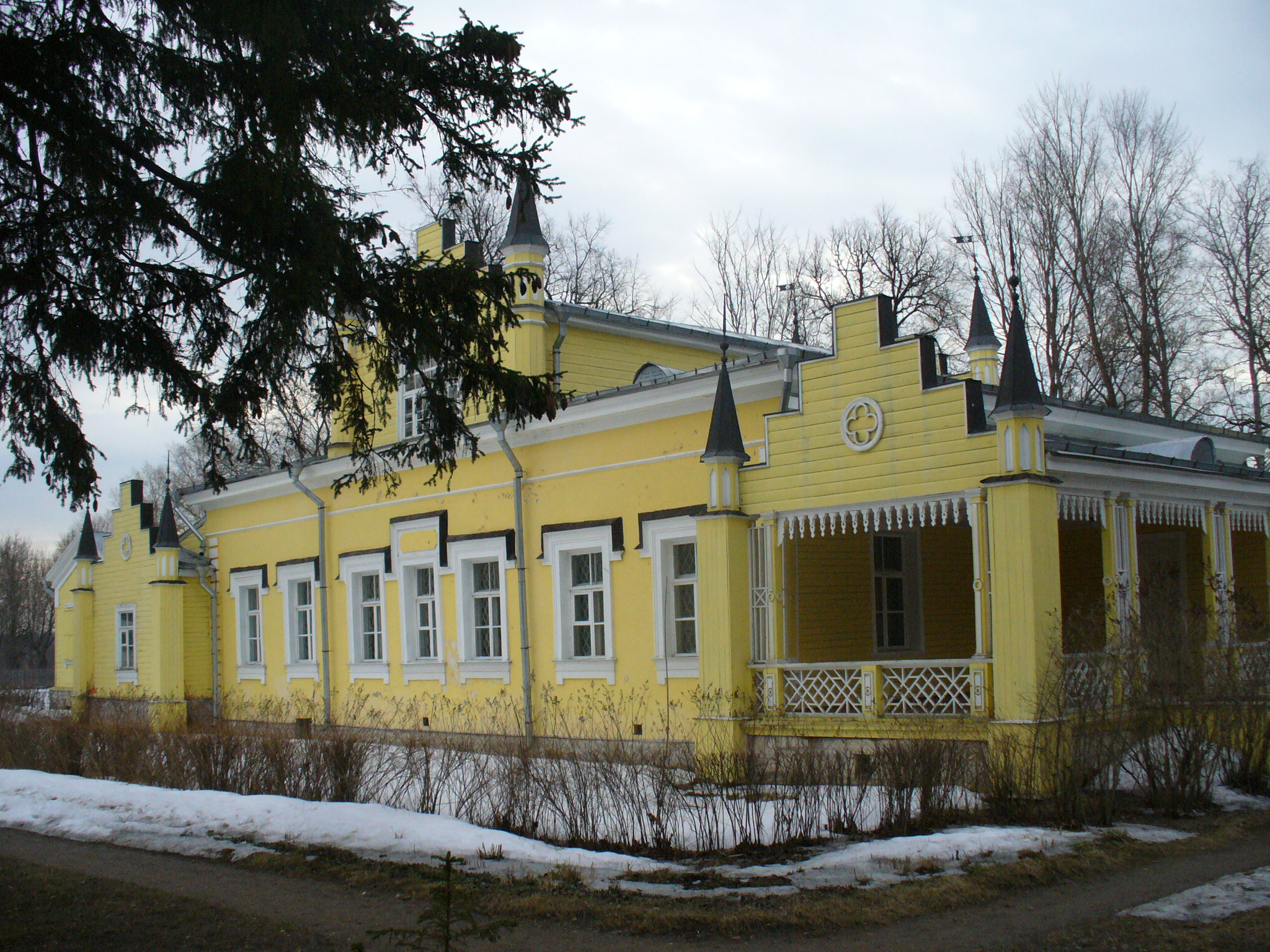
The main house of the estate of Izvara

The district contains eight cultural heritage monuments of federal significance and additionally 155 objects classified as cultural and historical heritage of local significance. The federal monuments are the ensemble of postal station in the village of Chirkovitsy, the estate in the village of Kaskovo, as well as the pole in the village of Yablonitsy which lists the population of the village as of the 1870s.

The estate of the Russian artist and philosopher, Nicholas Roerich, was located in the village of Izvara. It is currently preserved as a museum and is the only state museum in the district.
