= Novotrans =

Russian transportation and logistic enterprise

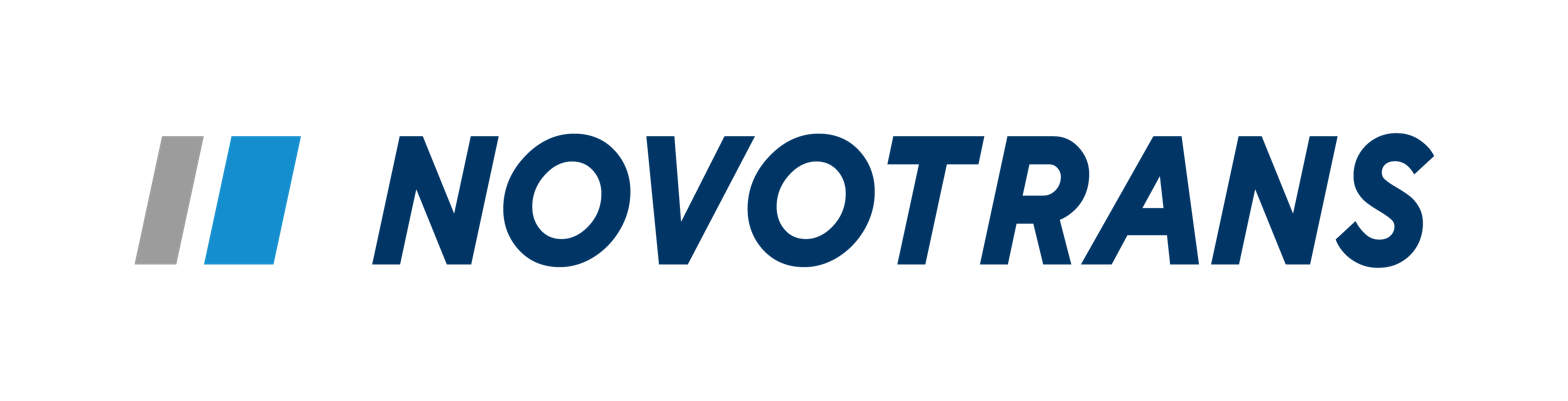
- Native name: Новотранс
- Industry: cargo transportation
- Founded: 2004
- Headquarters: Russia
- Key people: Konstantin Goncharov
- Number of employees: over 5000
- Website: novotrans.com/en/

Novotrans Group of Companies is a large-scale Russian transportation and logistic enterprise. It provides freight railway operations using its own massive rolling stock, stevedoring operations, as well as carriage construction and maintenance. The holding comprises over 30 companies in various regions of Russia and CIS employing a workforce exceeding 5,000 individuals. It is headed by the President Konstantin Goncharov.

== History ==
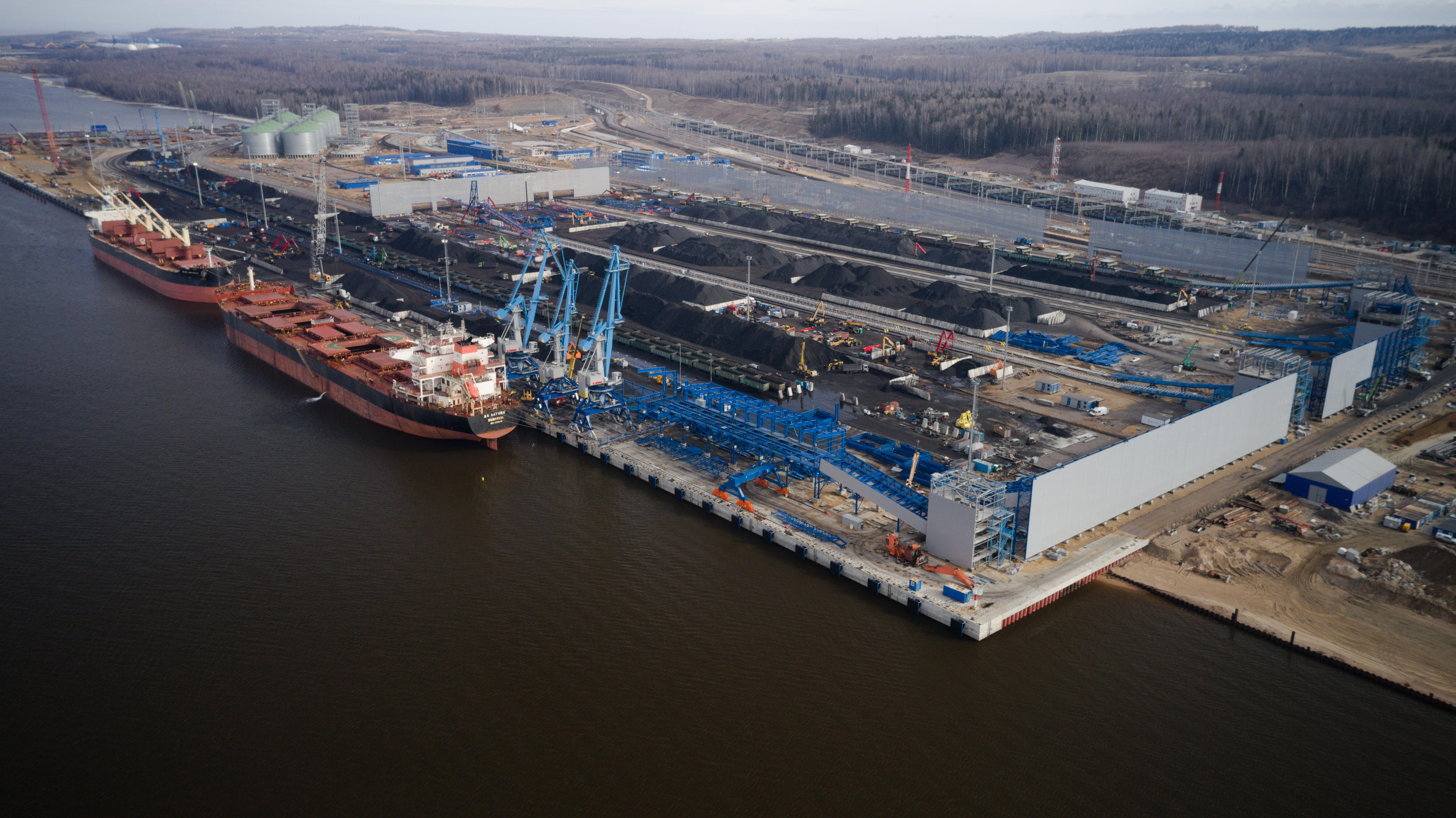
Universal cargo terminal Lugaport of Novotrans in April 2024

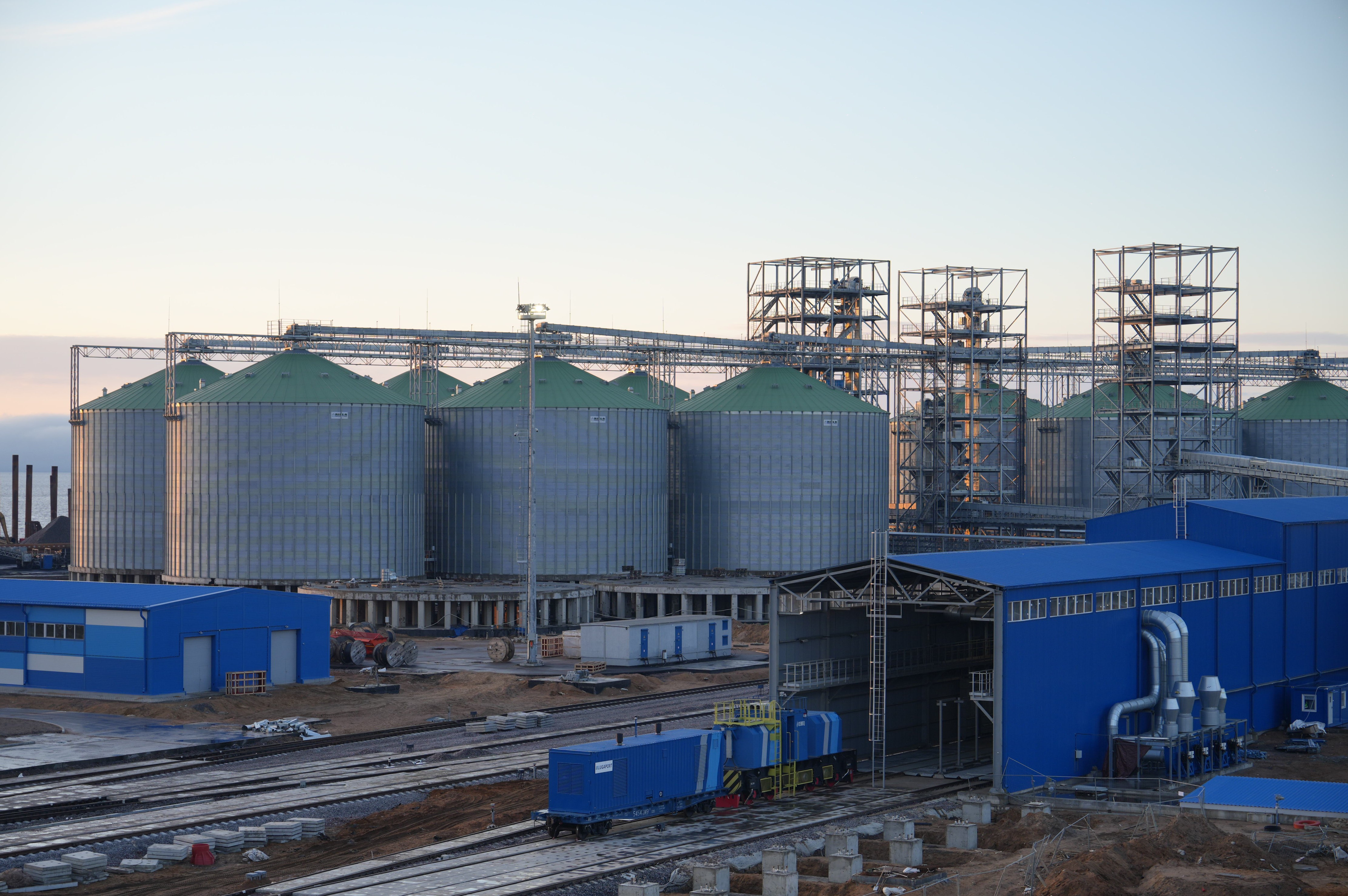
Agricultural complex of the universal marine terminal Lugaport by Novotrans

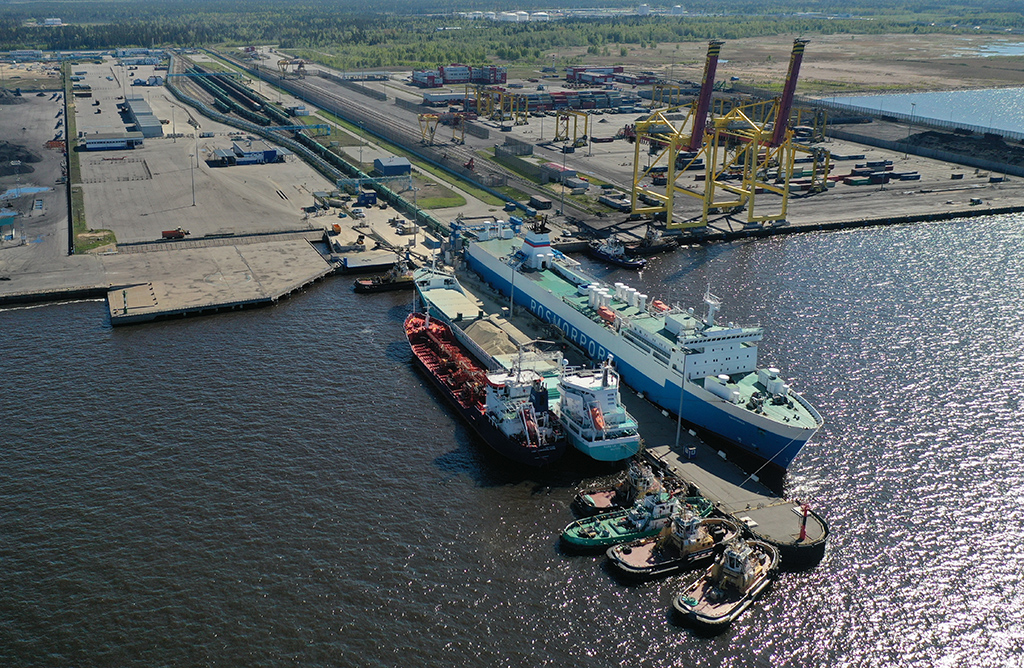
Automobile and railway ferry complex in the port of Ust-Luga

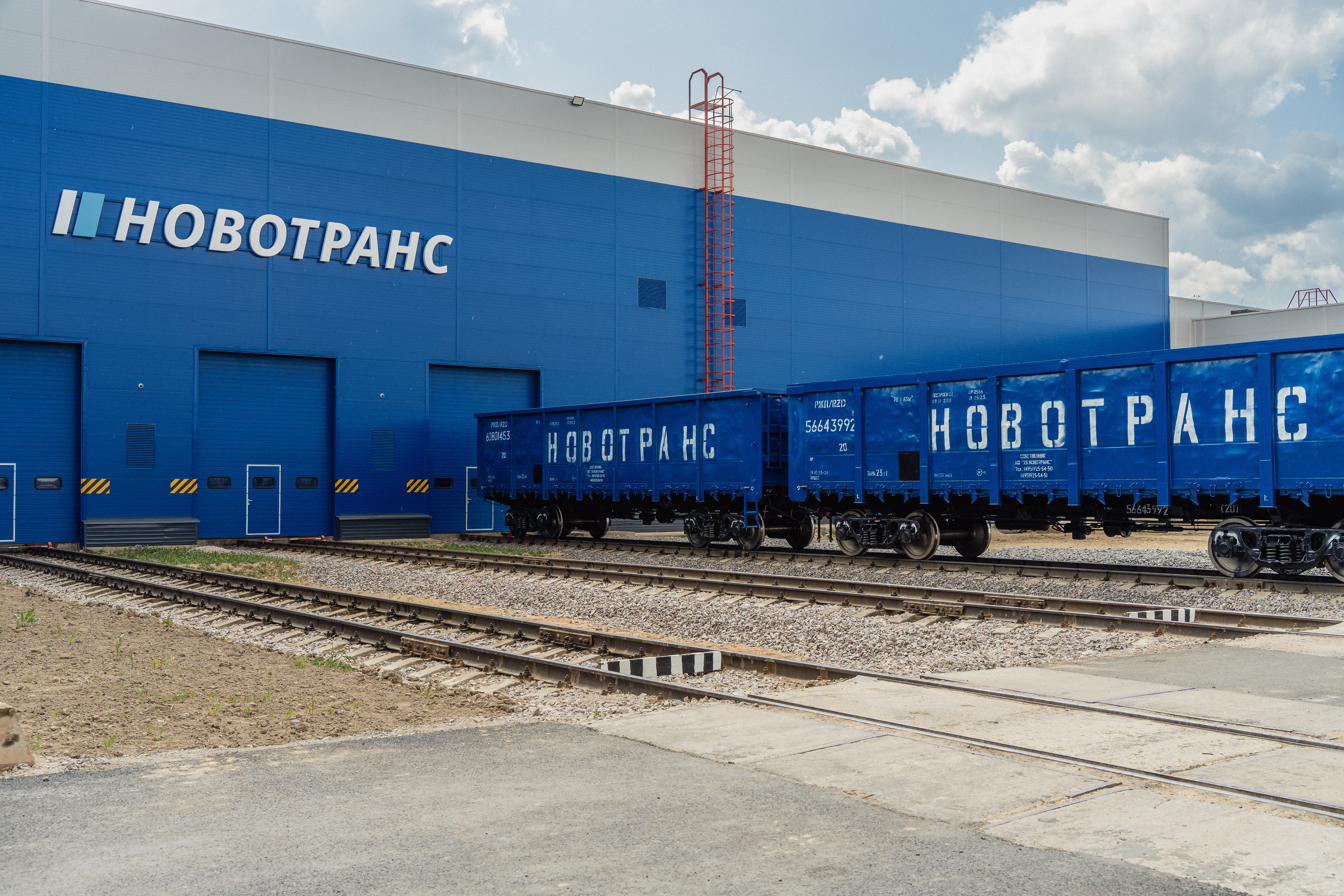
Baltic Wagon Maintenance Depot "Novotrans", June 2023

The company was established in 2004 as a railway operator focused on coal transportation.

Over the following years, the company expanded its operations by commissioning several freight car repair and maintenance depots: in 2008 in Tayturka, Irkutsk oblast; in 2009 — in Prokopyevsk, Kemerovo oblast; in 2012 — in Biysk, Altai krai; in 2013 — in Kashira, Moscow oblast.

In 2015, Konstantin Goncharov acquired Novotrans, leading to the formation of the Novotrans Group of Companies. Later that year, the Group of Companies consolidated its wagon maintenance capabilities under the newly established entity — Novotrans Wagon Maintenance and Repair Company.

In 2018, Novotrans began the construction of the Lugaport multipurpose marine terminal, located in Luga Bay, Leningrad oblast. This project saw significant progress when, in January 2020, JSC Ust-Luga Company — originally founded in 1992 to oversee the Ust-Luga sea trade port project — became part of the Novotrans holding. By 2023–2024, the first phase of construction was completed, including the commissioning of piers 1, 2, 3 along with associated infrastructure.

In 2019, Novotrans was appointed as the general agent of Rosmorport (Russian government seaport operator) managing stevedoring services on the ferry route between Ust-Luga and the port of Baltiysk in Kaliningrad oblast.

At the start of 2020, the Group of Companies completed the second phase of the Kuzbass Wagon Repair and Maintenance Enterprise (КВРП) increasing its capacity to 30 thousand railcars annually and making it the largest wagon maintenance and repair facility in Russia.

=== Ratings ===
Since 2012, the company has consistently ranked in the Top 15 of the INFOLine Rail Russia TOP rolling stock operator rating. From 2018 to 2021, it was included in the RBC 500 Largest Russian Companies ranking. In 2019, the Expert RA rating agency assigned JSC Holding Company Novotrans a credit rating of ruA with a stable outlook. This rating was upgraded to ruA+ in 2021 and further increased to ruAA- in 2023.

== Activities ==
=== Freight rail transportation ===
Novotrans is one of the largest private railway operators in the Russian Federation and the CIS, with its own fleet of over 25 thousand universal gondola cars. The company primarily transports coal, iron ore, metals, construction materials. In 2023, Novotrans achieved a freight turnover of 75 billion ton-kilometers and transported over 29 million tons of cargo. The company’s main clients include leading metallurgical and coal mining enterprises.

=== Carriage construction and repair ===
The holding operates four wagon maintenance and repair depots located in Kashira (Moscow oblast), Prokopyevsk (Kemerovo oblast), Tayturka (Irkutsk oblast) and in Volosovo (Leningrad oblast).

These facilities, equipped with modern technology, provide maintenance and repair for all types of rolling stock, including those owned by Novotrans and other operators. Scheduled repairs at these depots are completed in no more than three days, which is considered the best turnaround time in the network. The depots have a total capacity for scheduled repairs of over 80,000 cars per year and for wheelset repairs of over 96,000 per year.

Since 2023, Novotrans has been developing its own railcar construction line based on the Biysk Railcar Building Plant. On June 6, 2024 the Novotrans holding company and the Leningrad oblast administration signed an agreement to invest 4.9 billion rubles in the production of hopper and gondola cars based in Volosovo, Leningrad oblast.

=== Stevedoring services ===
Lugaport is a large-scale investment project of the Novotrans Group of Companies to construct a multipurpose marine terminal in the Baltic seaport of Ust-Luga (Leningrad oblast). The terminal is designed to handle bulk, general, grain and food cargo six piers accommodating Panamax, New Panamax and Baby Capesize vessels. The depth at the piers is 17.5 m, and the terminal is projected to handle a cargo turnover of up to 24.26 million tons per year.

The multi-purpose terminal will be able to receive up to 1,100 railcars per day from the Luzhskaya-Generalnaya railway station. In 2023, the first construction facilities were commissioned, including piers 1, 2, 3 and the adjacent infrastructure.

Novotrans is the general agent of the Rosmorport Federal State Unitary Enterprise at the automobile and rail ferry complex in the Baltic Ust-Luga seaport. The ferry complex provides sea freight service between the Leningrad and Kaliningrad regions without crossing the borders of other states, operating year-round on the Ust-Luga–Baltiysk–Ust-Luga route with ferries Baltiysk, Ambal, Antey, Marshal Rokossovsky and General Chernyakhovsky.

=== Other activities ===
Novotrans is a member of the Union of Railway Transport Operators (СОЖТ) and the Association of Railway Equipment Manufacturers (ОПЖТ).

In 2018, the company founded the Novotrans-5P charity foundation, which supports projects in memory of the Great Patriotic War, including search teams and reburial initiatives, restores and establishes new monuments to war heroes. Over 6 years of work, information about more than 2,000 soldiers and commanders of the Red Army has been restored. The Novotrans-5P foundation also helps orphanages in the regions where Novotrans operates: in Buryatia, Kuzbass, and the Leningrad oblast.

== Economic performance ==
In 2023, the company reported the following International Financial Reporting Standards (IFRS) indicators:

- taxes — RUB 11.08 billion;
- net profit — RUB 15.8 billion;
- asset value — RUB 165.7 billion;
- consolidated revenue — RUB 56.7 billion.

In 2019, the Expert RA rating agency assigned JSC Holding Company Novotrans a credit rating of ruA with a stable outlook; in 2021 the rating was upgraded to ruA+, and in 2023 further increased to ruAA-.
