= Kurgalsky Peninsula =

Russian peninsula between the Narva and Luga bays

Coordinates: 59°42′N 28°08′E

Designations

Ramsar Wetland
- Designated: 13 September 1994
- Reference no.: 690

The south coast of the Gulf of Finland.

The Kurgalsky Peninsula (Russian: Кургальский полуостров) is a peninsula that divides the southern part of the Gulf of Finland into the Narva Bay (to the west) and the Luga Bay (to the east). The northernmost spot is Cape Pitkenen-Nos. The peninsula is rather boggy and contains several lakes. About 650 km^{2} of wetland are protected as a Ramsar site. The port of Ust'-Luga is situated on the peninsula. There are many Izhorian villages in the district.

== See also ==
- Soikinsky Peninsula
