= Liquefied natural gas industry in Russia =

LNG in Russia

The first plant, Sakhalin II, was completed in Russia in 2009 having utilised the skills of Shell plc, who under duress sold 50% of the project to Gazprom in 2006. Prior to 2017 Gazprom was the sole producer of Liquefied Natural Gas (LNG) in Russia.

The cost of a large LNG plant can be massive, with a plant costing $15-25 billion and often needing additional infrastructure of a town, pipelines to bring in gas, storage facilities, a port and ships to export the LNG, raising the cost to $30-50 billion, often needing foreign investment and being given tax concessions to help fund the project.

LNG forms part of Russia's long term Energy strategy. In 2013 private Russian companies were authorized to export LNG. An increase in production capacity from 2017 saw a threefold increase in exports from 11 to 33 million tons per annum (MTPA) by 2022.

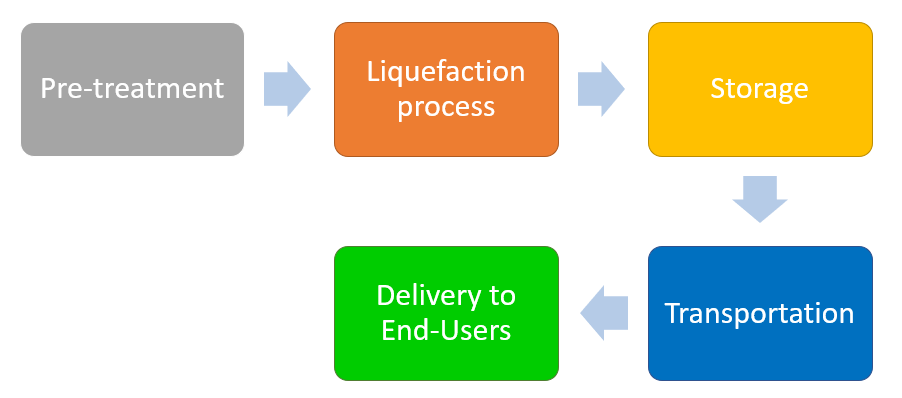
LNG life-cycle.

== Companies ==
The leading LNG company in Russia is Novatek who had plans in 2023 to generate LNG capacity of 70 MTPA by 2030. In December 2022, French company TotalEnergies withdrew from the Novatek board and wrote off their $3.7 billion shareholding in Novatek as a result of sanctions following the 2022 Russian invasion of Ukraine.

Gazprom is undertaking very few developments, with Portovaya LNG being the only plant that has been built for them; another Gazprom project, Baltic LNG, was under construction in 2023.

Rosneft is only in the design stage of LNG plants.

== Exports ==
In early 2022, Russia was the fourth largest LNG exporter with sales forecasted to increase as the production capacity rises to 15-20% of the world market by 2035.

The global demand for LNG was expected to rise 85% from 2021 levels to 650-700 MTPA by 2040 with the USA and Qatar, which already exported 70-80 MTPA each, expected to fill this growing market.

Exports from Russian Arctic plants relies on ice breaking LNG carriers; only a few Arc7-class tankers have been built of the 21 ordered. 15 were to be built in Russia at a cost of $9.6 billion; however the hulls were to be built in South Korea and essential equipment on board the ships was to be sourced from South Korea and Japan which has been affected by sanctions, the remaining six were to be constructed in South Korea. Three Korean construction orders were cancelled in May 2022 when payment deadlines were missed.

From 2014 Russia used Fluxys facilities in Zeebrugge, Belgium for transshipment of LNG exports to the Asia-Pacific region or to feed into the EU network. In 2023 the EU is proposing a law to allow EU countries to block Russia using LNG terminals in Europe, which may block access to the Fluxys terminal, this wider proposed EU law, planned for 2024, would control all gas energy products, allowing the EU to block Russian access to European pipelines and LNG terminals making delivery impossible, allowing countries to cancel long term supply contracts by claiming force majeure.

With the European Union committed to ending the purchase of fossil fuels from Russia by 2027, Russia is seeking LNG markets elsewhere.

== Plants ==
=== Technology ===
==== Liquefaction process ====
The most important infrastructure needed for LNG production and transportation is an LNG plant consisting of one or more LNG trains, each of which is an independent unit for gas liquefaction and purification. A typical train consists of a compression area, propane condenser area, and methane and ethane areas.

==== Storage ====
Floating storage units are needed at the arctic plants to hold the LNG before transfer to an Arc7 LNG gas tanker for onward shipment.

==== Transportation ====
Transhipment from the arctic plants need a specialist ship. The first-generation Yamalmax LNG carriers were designed to be capable of breaking through ice 1.5 metres (4.9 ft) thick with its bow and 2.1 metres (6.9 ft) ice when travelling backwards. Each ship is 300 metres (980 ft) long and 50 metres (160 ft) wide with a capacity of 172,600 cubic metres (6,100,000 cu ft), powered by 6 diesel electric engines giving 45 megawatts with the propulsion capable of rotating 360 degrees. 15 Arc7 ships serve the Yamal LNG plant.

Second-generation Arc7 ships were designed in December 2020 by Finnish icebreaker designer Aker Arctic, along with South Korea’s Daewoo Shipbuilding & Marine Engineering. The first are currently under construction, with 51 MW power units making them capable of dealing with thicker ice. Novatek needs 42 of the new design to serve the new Arctic LNG 1, 2 and 3 plants and deliver the LNG eastwards to Kamchatka for onward delivery to Asian customers.

=== Operational plants ===
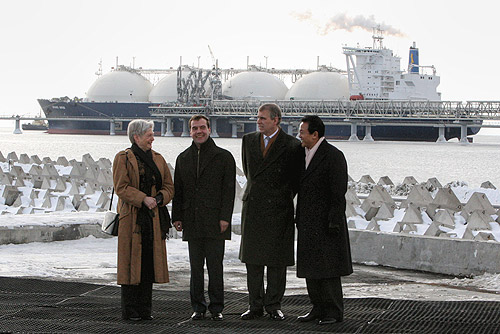
Russian president Dmitry Medvedev, japanese Prime Minister Taro Aso, Prince Andrew, Duke of York, and dutch Minister of Economic Affairs Maria van der Hoeven visit the Sakhalin-II project on 18 February 2009

- Sakhalin-II was the first LNG plant in Russia, planned to be built for Shell plc, with Gazprom acquiring 50% in 2006, located on Sakhalin island off the east coast of Russia in the Sea of Okhotsk. with a capacity of 9.6 MTPA.
- 'The Yamal LNG plant, started in 2012 by Novatek and Gazprom is in Yamalo-Nenets Autonomous Okrug and has access to the arctic Kara Sea. The ownership changed in 2014 to Novatek 60% with 20% each held by China's CNPC and France's TotalEnergies. The project cost $26.9 billion. Novatec has since sold 9.9% to the China Silk Road Fund. Becoming operational in 2017 with China as the main export market, exports are being achieved using ice breaking gas tankers, the plant has a capacity of 16.5 MTPA.
- Cryogas-Vysotsk, or Vysotsk LNG, plant is a small operation with access to the Baltic Sea, owned by Novatek and Gazprombank and started operation in 2019 the two trains have a capacity of just 0.67 MTPA. Plans are in place in 2023 to expand the operation to 0.9 MTPA.
- Portovaya LNG is another small operation located close to the Russian Finnish border with access to the Baltic Sea that started in September 2022, using the gas pipeline that used to supply the Nord Stream pipeline. The plant has a capacity of 1.5 MTPA. A third train is planned with a capacity of 2 MTPA. In January 2024 the ownership changed to Gazprom 50%, Gazprombank 50%.
- Arctic LNG 2 became partly operational in January 2024, it is expected to cost $21.3 billion and is being constructed using pre assembly of modules on floating platforms that can be towed to the site at the Gyda Peninsula, the first 640,000-tonne train arriving in August 2023. A few modules are coming from China. It will use part of the natural gas supply to produce the electricity needed to compress and liquefy the gas into LNG. The capacity will come in 2026 from three trains giving 19.8 MTPA. Arctic LNG 2 is owned 60% by Novatek and 10% by each of TotalEnergies, China National Petroleum Corporation, China National Offshore Oil Corporation and Japan Arctic LNG (a consortium). Train 1 had to be modified as only four of the seven gas turbines were received from the US company Baker Hughes, alternative turbines are being sourced from China, but need five of the smaller Chinese turbines, until then it will run at 50% capacity. By December 2023 only three Arc7-class tankers were completed for Arctic LNG 2, Aleksey Kosygin, Pyotr Stolypin and Sergei Witte with delays caused by sanctions to another 21 tankers. In January 2024 TotalEnergies initiated a force majeure process on its contracts, withdrawing participation in the project.

=== Planned plants ===
- Arctic LNG 1 is proposed with a 2027 construction start date and a capacity of 19.8 MTPA once completed. Owned by Novatek, the gas reserves were only confirmed in late 2022.
- Arctic LNG 3 is proposed by Novatek with a construction start date of 2030 and a capacity when finished of 19.8 MTPA.
- Murmansk LNG: Novatek was given approval to build this plant in October 2023. It is hoped that construction will begin in 2024 with pre assembly of modules on floating platforms that can be towed to the site using the same Belokamenka construction yard as Arctic LNG 2. Excess electricity in the region will be used to power the LNG production. Once the third train is completed, capacity is expected to be 20.4 MTPA.
- Baltic LNG was announced in October 2021, a joint project between Gazprom and RusGazDobycha, being constructed at Ust-Luga with access to the Baltic Sea. It would process ethane-containing natural gas with a capacity of 13 MTPA through two trains. It was announced the project would be delayed two years to 2026 after Linde plc announced it could not complete the contract due to sanctions.
- Obsky LNG

== Sanctions ==
=== After annexation of Crimea ===
In 2014 US sanctions prohibited Western companies from working on Russian Arctic offshore oil projects. Novatek was also sanctioned to block western finance of projects.

=== After 2022 Russian invasion of Ukraine ===
Following the February 2022 invasion of Ukraine, international sanctions have been placed on many Russian exports, but not directly on Russian LNG exports, although some countries have imposed bans on imports into their own countries including the USA, and in October 2022 the Baltic states and the UK.

The EU continues to import LNG from Russia, and in 2022 increased their purchases by 35% to 13.8 million tons (19.2bcm). Spain is a major importer of Russian LNG in 2022 and 2023 at around 5m tons. France bought 3.6m tonnes and 4.9m tonnes went through Zeebrugge. In 2023 the EU was importing roughly the same amount of gas in LNG form, as it was receiving via pipelines, both around 25bcm p.a.

The sanctions that apply to the LNG industry in Russia comprise mainly embargoes on technology and the supply of equipment from Europe and the USA that are needed to build new LNG plants as well as finance for projects. It is believed in 2023 by the sanction countries that the current restrictions will drastically reduce the opportunities for the industry’s expansion in Russia. In July and September 2023 the USA sanctioned individuals and entities, including non-Russian, the aim being to target engineering and construction companies that are involved in various oil and gas projects in Russia, including as of September 2023 the Arctic LNG 2 plant and transshipment terminals.

Arctic LNG 2 trains two and three will be delayed as gas turbines are not available from the west to power the plant needing a reconfiguration of the system. Delays are also expected in completion of Arc7 ice-class tankers, until late 2024 and an LNG floating storage unit ordered from South Korea. Additional delays from sanctions means that 10 Arc7 ships being built by Russia may not be all completed by 2030 as Samsung Heavy Industries has refused to build blocks and equipment essential for these ships and Gaztransport & Technigaz suspended working with Russia in January 2023.

In December 2023 Novatek announced that the start of Arctic LNG 2 will be delayed after sending force majeure notices to some buyers citing sanctions imposed by the US in November make it impossible to supply gas, foreign investors from France, China and Japan had themselves declared “force majeure” halted their participation.

The main Baltic LNG equipment supply company Linde plc pulled out in 2022 due to sanctions issues and additional project suppliers of equipment have also been sanctioned by the US Treasury.

== Taxation ==
LNG exporters are taxable in Russia on profits at 20% plus 3% in 2017-24, which increased from 2023-25 with an elevated profits tax of 34%. However Gazprom was exempt from the rise; this resulted in February 2023 in complaints from Novatek.

Novatek's Yamal LNG does not benefit from the elevated tax exemption, but has a tax break with a 13.5% tax rate for 12 years or until production reached 250bcm and is also exempt from export taxes and mining taxes for nine years.

== Government intervention ==
In 2020, the Russian government approved an incentive program worth over $300 billion for Arctic infrastructure, industrial, LNG and oil and gas extraction projects, to encourage others to invest in the Arctic.

In 2021, the government agreed to the Russian National Wealth Fund providing loans for the expansion of the Baltic LNG plant, an unprecedented size of loan for a single lender. Gazprom noted it wished to strengthen its position in foreign LNG markets.

In December 2023 a Russian presidential decree gave the government the power to confiscate and forcibly sell off assets belonging to European energy firms. New Russian-run companies have been created to take over shares in the Yuzhno-Russkoye oil and gas field. As of December 2023 this field was still owned by Austria’s OMV and Germany’s Wintershall Dea.

In December 2023 the Russian government ordered oil and gas producers to install anti drone protection at their plants, to ward off Ukrainian drone attacks.

== Environment ==
The exploitation of fossil fuels, especially in the Arctic is of concern to environmentalists. Russia’s 2020 Arctic strategy envisions transforming the Northern Sea Route into a competitive Asia-Europe maritime corridor by 2035, assisted by global warming which is making the normally frozen solid route more accessible. Due to its shorter length, navigation on the NSR contributes to reducing the carbon footprint of maritime transport, although this entails considerable risks for fragile Arctic ecosystems.

A 2022 report from the Russian Federal Service for Hydro-meteorology and Environmental Monitoring (Roshydromet) found that average temperatures along the Russian Arctic coast have increased by approximately 5 degrees Celsius since 1998. Russia has no plans to become carbon neutral before 2100 and intends to exploit fossil fuels in the Arctic for the Asian market.

The Arctic Council which represents the eight countries that have sovereignty in the Arctic and the resident Circumpolar peoples (Indigenous peoples), is limited to environmental protection, scientific research, and sustainable development but seems ineffective at controlling industrial development.

LNG is associated with climate change awareness, as the use of LNG generates about 50% less carbon dioxide than coal and 30% less carbon dioxide than oil.

It was reported in August 2022 that the Portovaya LNG plant was burning off 4.34 million cubic metres of gas, worth $10m by flare every day, generating 9,000 tonnes of CO_{2} and soot.

== Statistics ==
LNG production and exports
Year	Production	Exports	Note
	million tons		
2016	10.9 (16Bcm)	10.8	
2017	11.8	11.1	
2018	20.0	18.3	
2019	29.8	29.3	
2020	30.7	29.6	
2021	30.5	29.6	
2022	33.5 (49Bcm)	32.9	
2023		32.3	

== See also ==
- Petroleum industry in Russia
