= Izhorian Museum =

Ethnographic museum in Leningrad, Russia

Coordinates: 59°46′08″N 28°28′28″E

Izhorian museum
- Ingrian: Ižorin muuzeja Russian: Ижорский музей
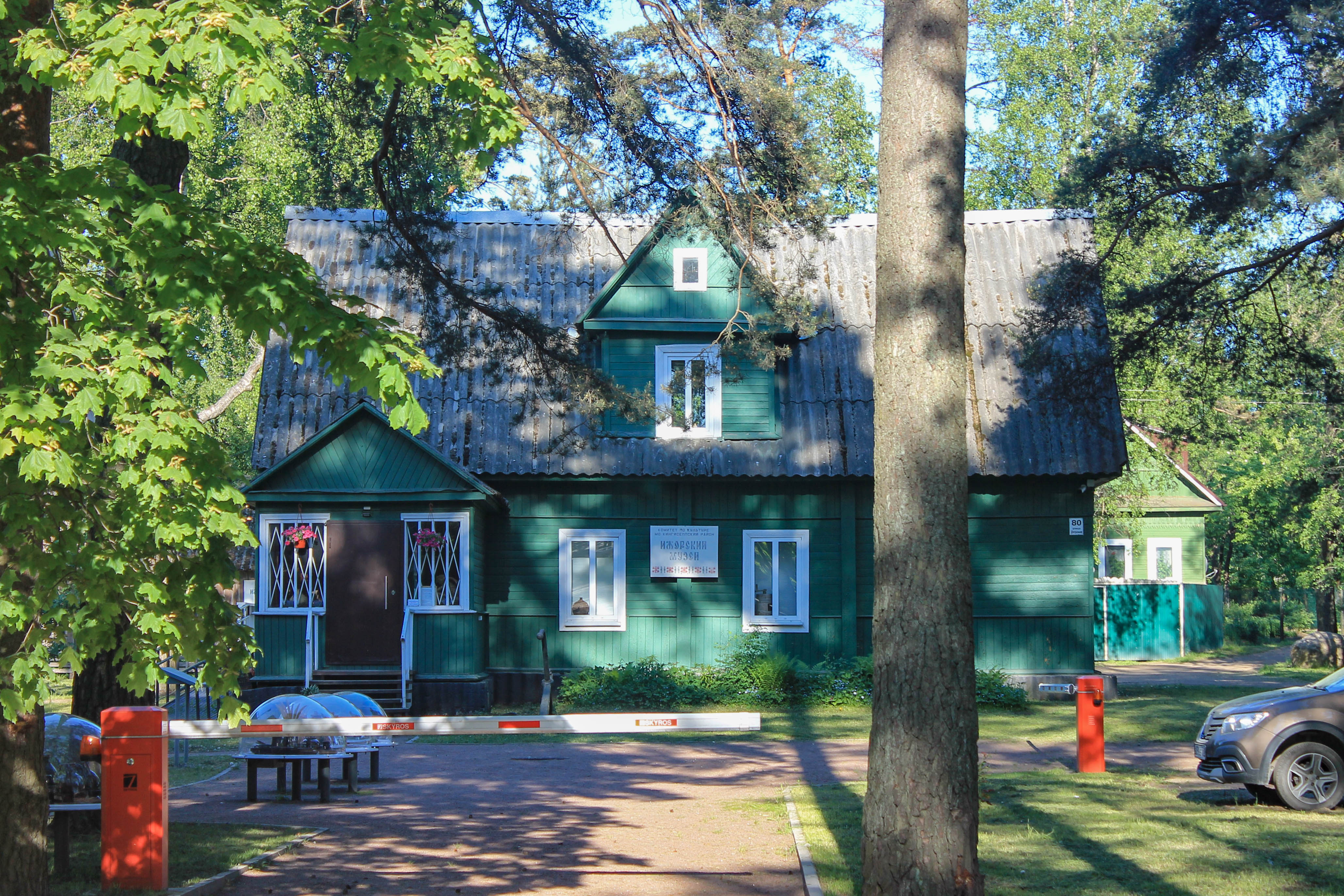
- Established: April 1, 1990
- Location: 80, Tsentralnaya street, Ruchyi, Kingiseppsky District, Leningrad Oblast, Russia
- Type: Ethnographic museum
- Visitors: ~1500 per year
- Website: izhora-museum.ru

The Izhorian museum (Museum of Izhórian culture, Ingrian: Ižorin muuzeja, Russian: Ижорский музей) is located in Ruchyi in Vistino, a rural settlement in Kingiseppsky District, Leningrad Oblast, Russia. There is also the Izhorian culture center working where visitors can learn handicrafts or the Ingrian language.

The museum's collection was started in 1990 and in 1993, the museum opened to the public in the building of the former Ruchyi elementary school. The collection is regularly updated, mainly by residents of surrounding villages. The collection includes housewares, an archeological exhibition, and photographs from the beginning of 20th century complementing the exhibition of the history of the Izhorian people.

== History ==
The museum's collection on Izhorian history and culture was founded on April 1, 1990. On October 1, 1993, the museum was opened with the support of the Baltika fishing team; the museum was located in the building of the former Ruchyi elementary school. At the beginning, the museum was rather small, had departmental status and a very narrow exhibition but after a few years, it gained status as an ethnographic one, and its collection grew. The growth came from donations from residents of surrounding villages and other places inhabited by Izhorians.

In 2014, the museum started to study Izhorian traditional pottery, planning to revive it, so it opened a pottery center. In 2015, the museum team fully changed. In 2019, the museum's rebuilding work their work attracted the attention of the Nord Stream 2 enterprise, which helped the museum financially. At the beginning of 2019, the first stone of the future language and handicraft center was laid; center's main specialty was pottery. The center was constructed from June to December 2019, and was inaugurated on March 13, 2020, by the governor of Leningrad Oblast Aleksandr Drozdenko.

Museum and center were working at April 2022.

== Description ==
Izhorian Museum is located in Ruchyi, a village in Vistino, a rural settlement in Kingiseppsky District, Leningrad Oblast. While Ruchyi village is located next to the rural settlement center, the museum is near the border of these two places, but most of the sources locate the museum in Vistino. The museum has two buildings; a former elementary school built in 1960s houses the museum exhibition while a newer building, which was built in 2019, is used by the Ingrian language and handicrafts center. A wooden anchor has been placed near the museum entrance.

The museum and the center are controlled by the Department of Culture of Kingiseppsky District Municipality, staff consists of a director, a curator, a guide, and a part-time cleaner. The museum has 1,500 visitors annually, coming mostly from Leningrad Oblast, Saint Petersburg and Finland.

=== Museum ===
The museum exhibition occupies two rooms on the building's first floor. The exhibits show the history of Izhorians from stone tools and other archeological finds to 20th-century images and housewares. A notable part of the exhibition is about fishing: there are hooks, fishing nets, floats, fishermen's clothing, and some models of traditional Izhorian fishing boats. Farming tools and some personal belongings are also exhibited. Traditional Izhorian clothes, mostly female, are a valuable part of the museum collection. There are casual and festive outfits made in the 19th and 20th centuries, fabric and knitted goods with traditional ornaments. There are also working tools of tailors and weavers, and traditional round chests for dowry. Pottery items are the important part of the collection; these mostly originate from the Bolshoye Stremleniye village. Drawings and documents complement the collection. Most of the housewares in the museum were donated by inhabitants of Vistino and other Izhorian villages in the area.

An archeological exhibition has artifacts from kurgans excavations in Kingiseppsky and Lomonosovsky Districts, including items from a 14th-century Izhorian grave and a 16th-century stone cross from Bolshoye Stremleniye village. The museum employees organized a folklore ensemble, participate in organisation of local holidays and festivals.

=== Language and skills center ===
The language and skills center building consists of a fully equipped pottery warehouse, an exhibition hall and few staff rooms with an area of 153 m^{2}. Aside from research on Izhorian traditional pottery, it holds classes for children and teenagers, and teaches weaving, knitting, traditional toy-making and making of Kukushkoittu clay whistles. The center works with cultural institutions in the region; its exhibitions were hosted in Kingisepp local history museum, Ivangorod Fortress powder storage museum, in the Burgher's mansion, and "Lakamunda" centers in Vyborg, Roerich museum institute in Saint Petersburg and others.
