= Siberian Business Union =

Russian holding company and conglomerate

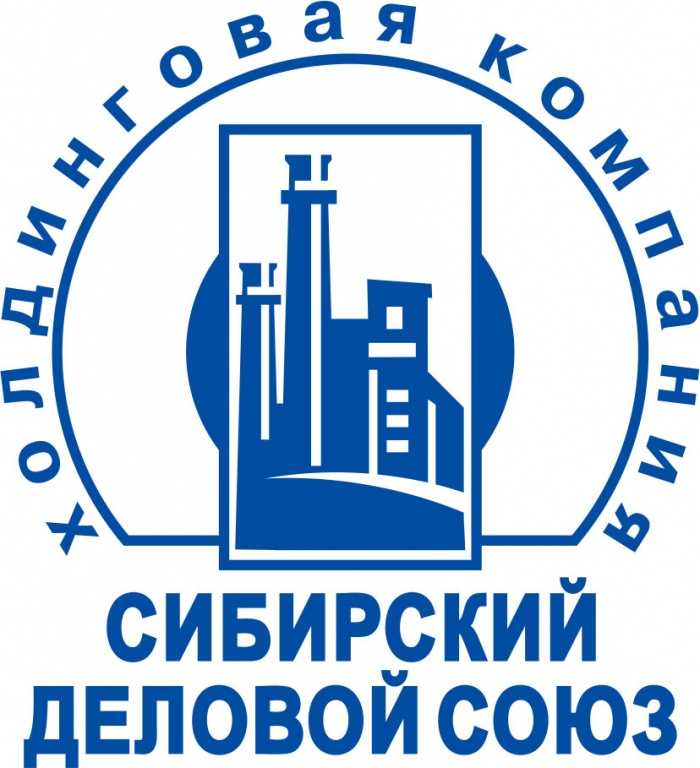
- Type: Private company
- Founded: 12 August 2004
- Headquarters: Kemerovo, Russia
- Number of employees: 38,300 (January 2011)
- Website: hcsds.ru/main.php

Siberian Business Union (abbreviated SBU; Russian: Сибирский деловой союз, romanized: Sibirskiy delovoy soyuz, SDS) is a Russian holding company and conglomerate based in the city of Kemerovo, in Siberia. Its companies are active in coal mining, railway transportation, chemicals, machine building and radio stations. SBU is linked with Vladimir Putin's United Russia party.

== Details and activities ==
The largest shareholder in SBU is the Russian billionaire Vladimir Gridin and his sons. Gridin is also a politician in the United Russia party. The SBU head office is located at Kemerovo in Siberia.

Its subsidiaries are involved in coal mining, railway transportation, chemicals, machine building and radio stations. SBU is Russia's third-largest producer of coal for power stations SBU was a partner with Kuzbassrazrezugol in plans to build a coal export port in the Barents Sea, but withdrew in 2013.

SBU obtained 25% of European Media Group, one of Russia's biggest radio networks, which includes Europa Plus, after Lagardère sold it for $162 million in 2011 after changes to Russian media ownership regulations. SBU intended to increase their ownership to 100%.

In June 2011, SBU enlisted its entire workforce in the All-Russia People's Front, an organisation created by Vladimir Putin and associated with the United Russia party.

== Subsidiaries ==
- SBU-Coal
- SBU-Engineering
- Novotrans
- SBU-Construction
- SBUAgro
- SBU-Alco
- SBU-Media
- SBU-Energy
