= Ust-Luga Multimodal Complex =

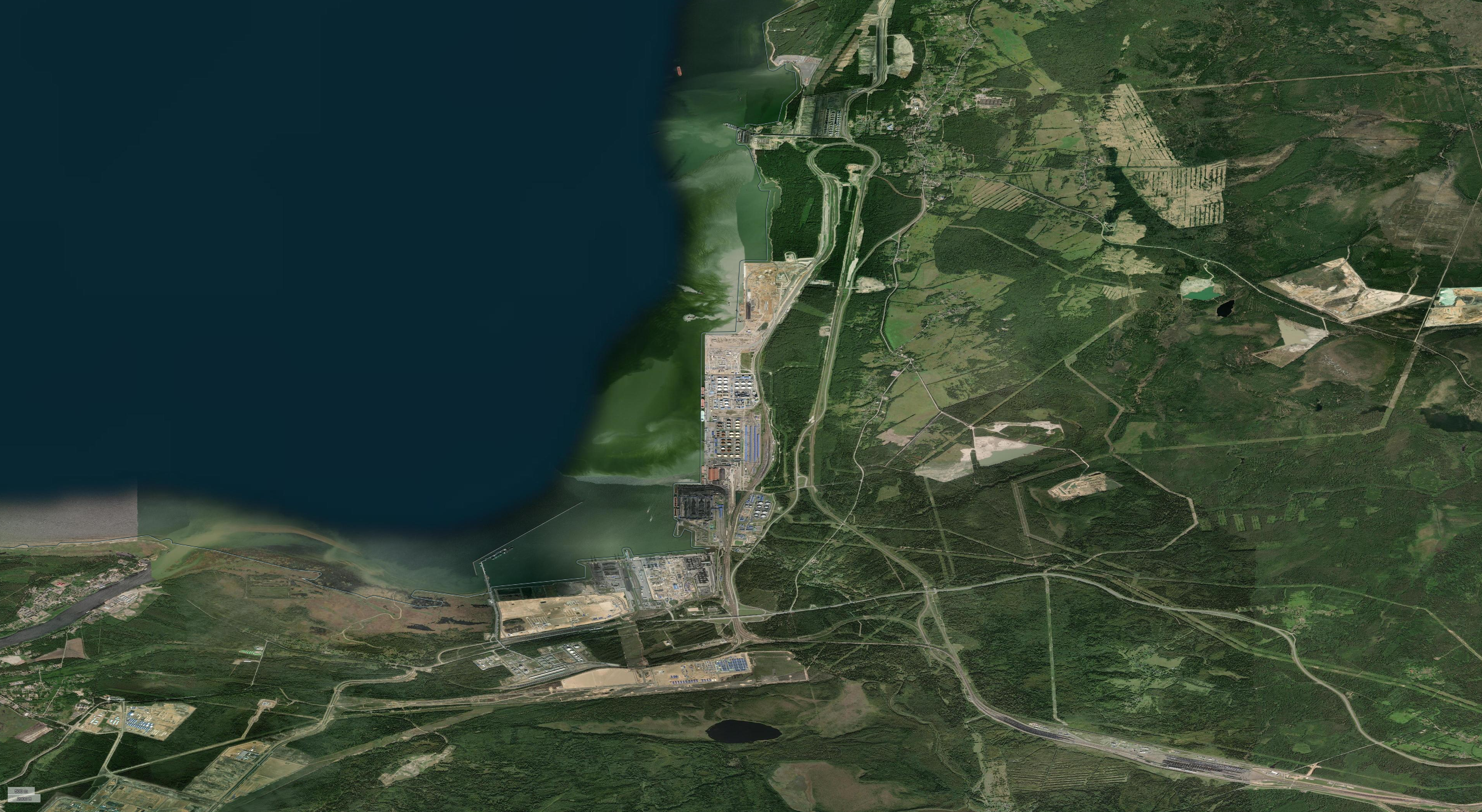
- Satellite imagery of Ust-Luga Multimodal Complex
- Interactive map of Ust-Luga Multimodal Complex
- Location within Russia

Location
- Country: Russia
- Location: Ust-Luga
- Coordinates: 59.765906°N 28.477592°E
- UN/LOCODE: RUULU

Details
- Land area: 3,000 ha (7,400 acres)

Statistics
- Website https://ust-luga-mmc.ru/EN/

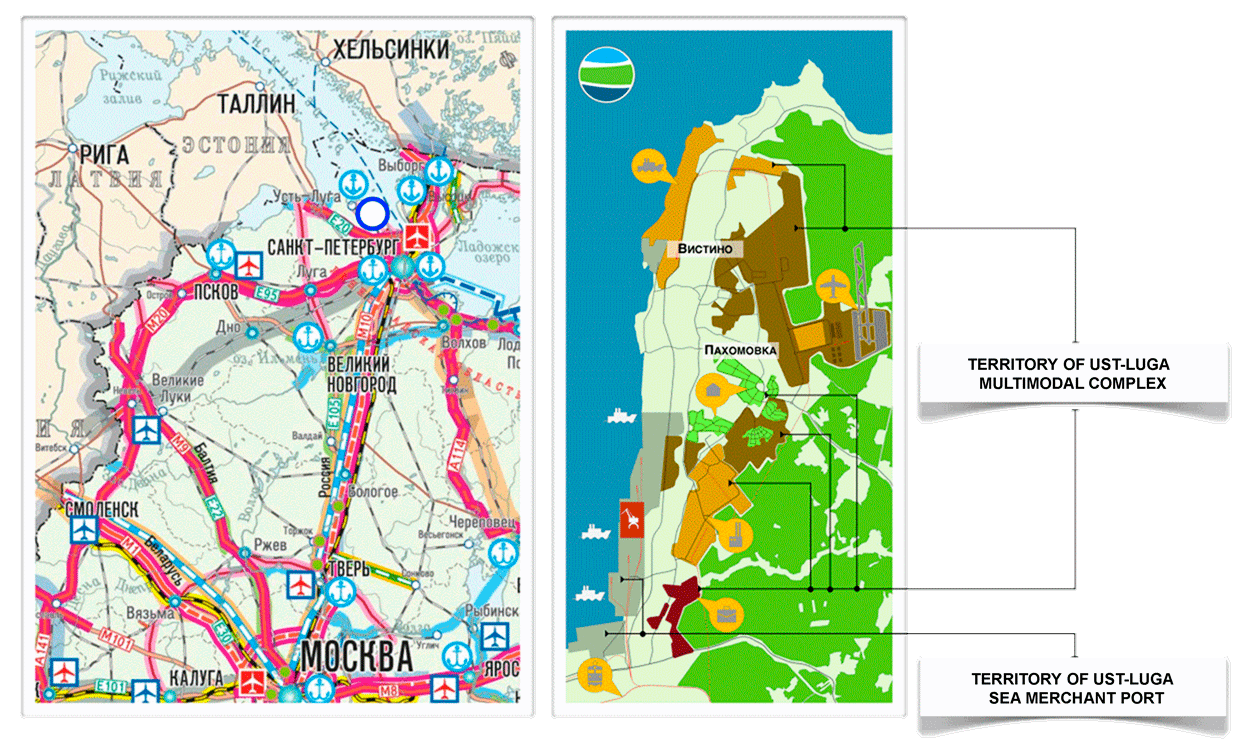
Ust-Luga Multimodal Complex scheme

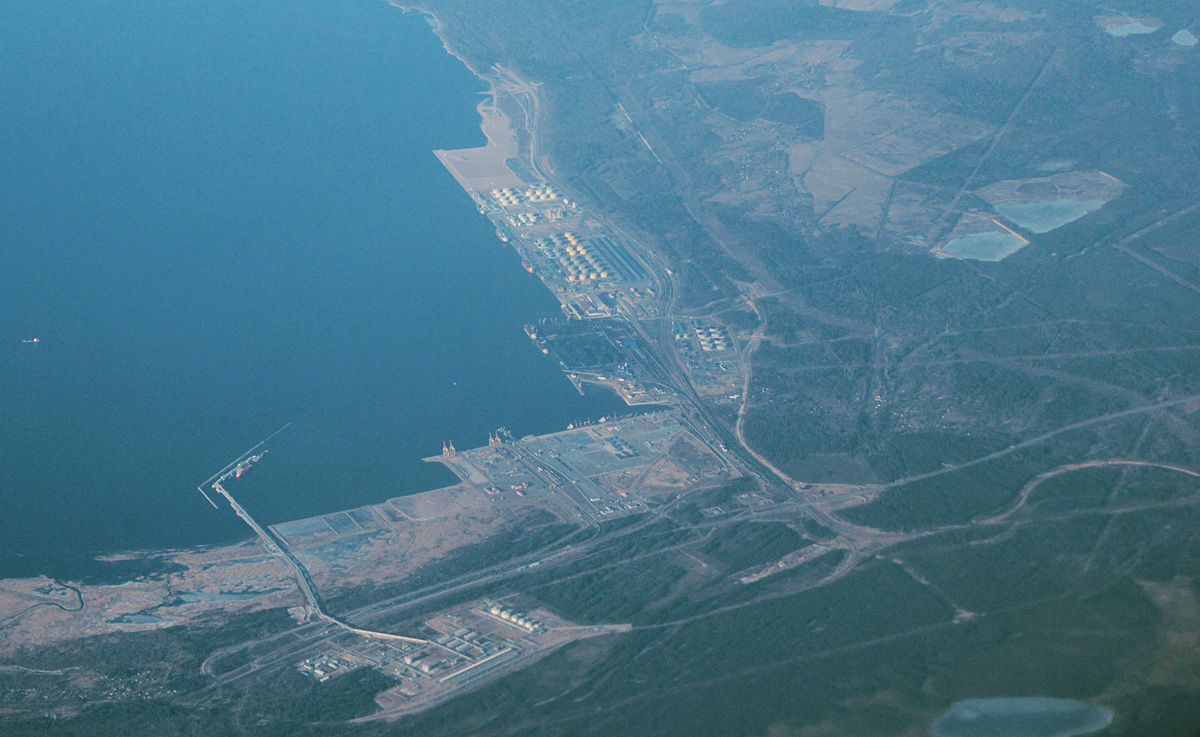
Aerial photo

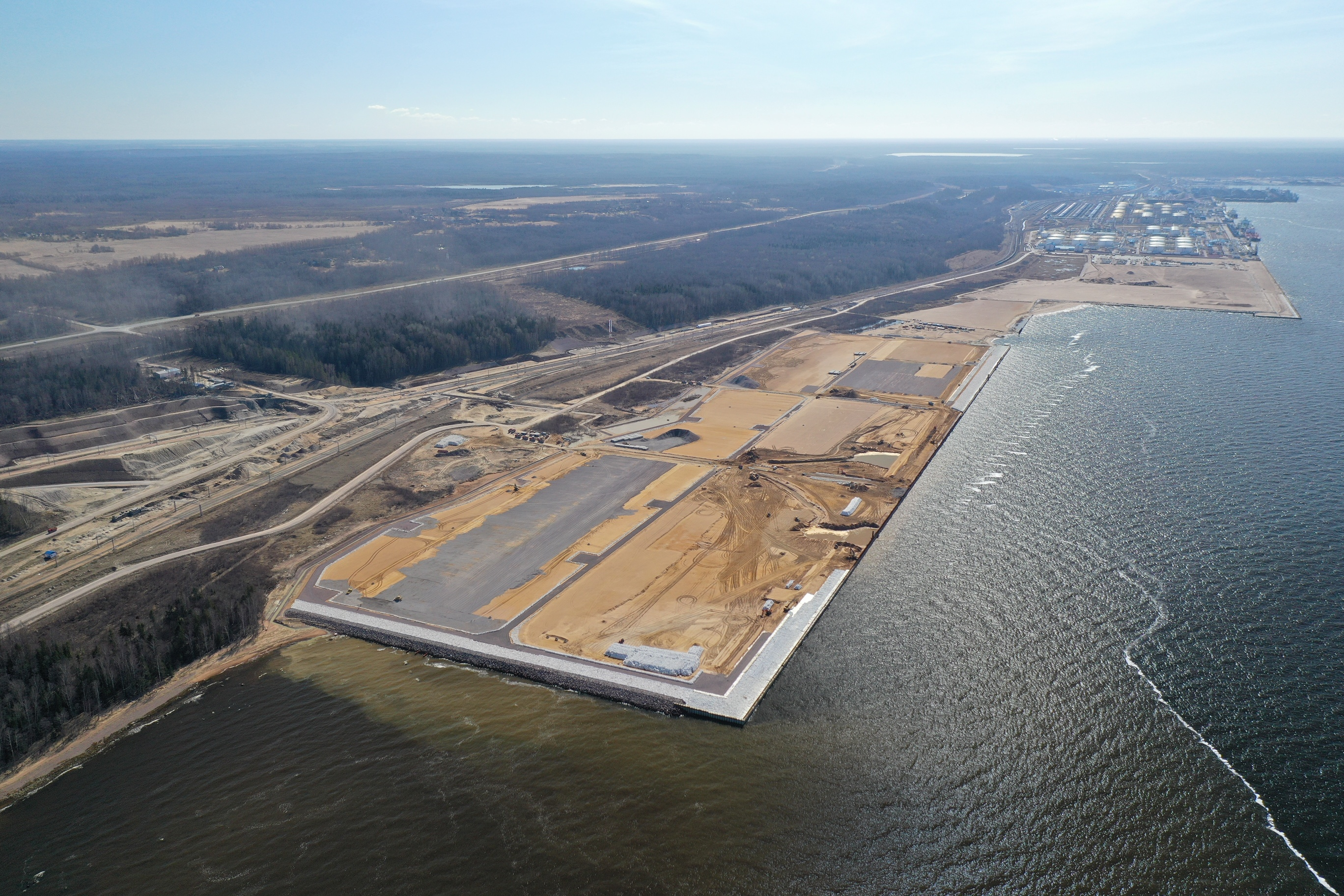
Construction of terminal "Lugaport" by Novotrans

Ust-Luga Multimodal Complex (Russian: Мультимодальный комплекс Усть-Луга, Multimodalnyi kompleks Ust-Luga) is a project aimed at development of the portside area of about 3000 hectares located on the Soikinsky Peninsula by the Gulf of Finland in close proximity to the terminals of Ust-Luga Sea Merchant Port in Kingiseppsky District of Leningrad Oblast, Russia. The project developer is LLC "Multimodal complex Ust-Luga".

== Proposed infrastructure ==
The development project of Ust-Luga Multimodal Complex envisages the following infrastructure:

- an international cargo airport
- an industrial zone, a logistics zone, a temporary storage warehouses zone
- a business park
- a residential zone (intended for building)

== Planning ==
Now OJSC "NIIP Gradostroitelstva" has completed the elaboration of an area planning scheme for Kingiseppsky district. This scheme determined the functional purpose of the project land. FSUE "RosNIPIUrbanistiki" completed a Master Plan of the Vistinsky settlement. The Master Plan includes the location of Ust-Luga Multimodal Complex as well. JSC "Lenaeroproject" made investigations and prepared a positive opinion on the technical possibility of constructing a cargo airport on the grounds of the Ust-Luga Multimodal Complex. The airport will be able to accommodate all types of cargo aircraft. Regulative bodies of the Leningrad region gave their approval to locate the cargo airport.

== Russo-Ukrainian War ==
On 21 January 2024, the Security Service of Ukraine conducted an overnight drone attack on the gas terminal, causing a large fire, which took over a day to extinguish. Gas producer Novatek subsequently suspended all operations at the complex in response to the attack.

On 24 August 2025, Ukrainian drones attacked and caused fire at the Novatek gas terminal. Social media videos showed damage to a fractionating column of the facility.

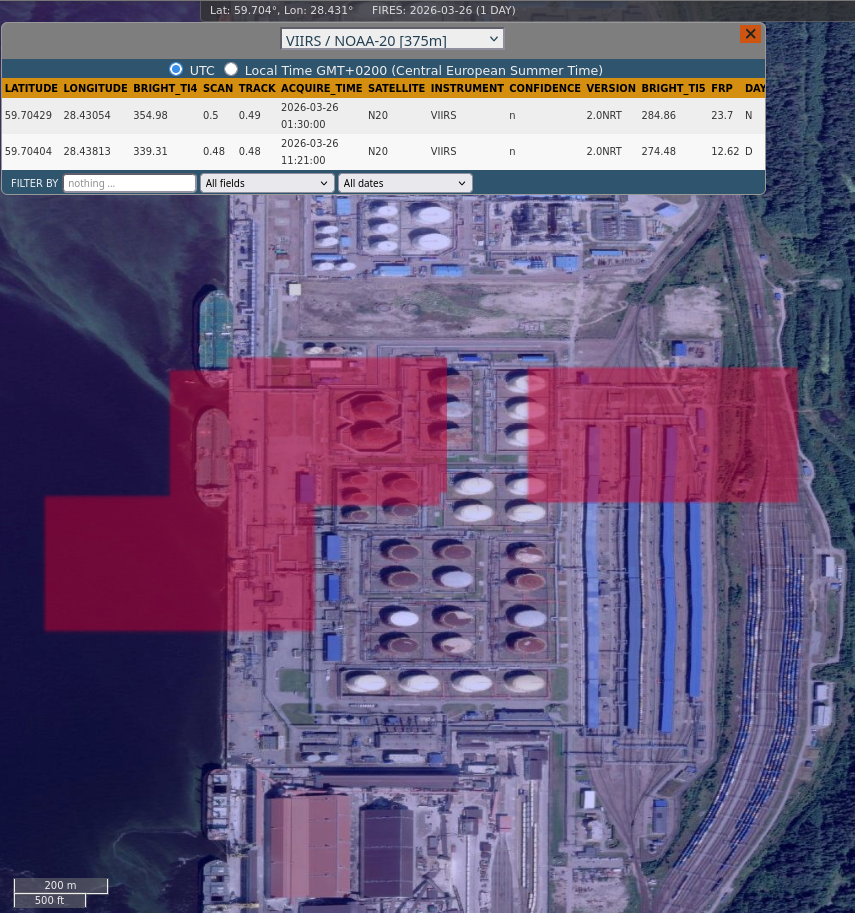
NASA's FIRMS detected fires on 26 March 2026 01:30:00 (UTC) at the Ust-Luga Multimodal Complex

On 25 March 2026, Ukrainian drones carried out a large-scale attack on the port of Ust-Luga, causing a major fire and damaging oil storage and loading infrastructure, which forced the suspension of crude oil and petroleum product shipments. The strike was part of a broader campaign targeting Russian energy export facilities, with Ukrainian officials stating that such attacks were aimed at undermining Russia’s war economy. In the following days, attacks on the region continued, and by 27 March Ukrainian drones had again targeted Ust-Luga and nearby ports, contributing to prolonged disruptions in operations. As a result, loadings at the port remained halted, fires were still being dealt with, and Russian oil producers warned that they might declare force majeure due to the sustained strikes on Baltic export terminals.
