= Vistino =

Rural locality in Kingiseppsky District, Russia

Coordinates: 59°46′N 28°28′E

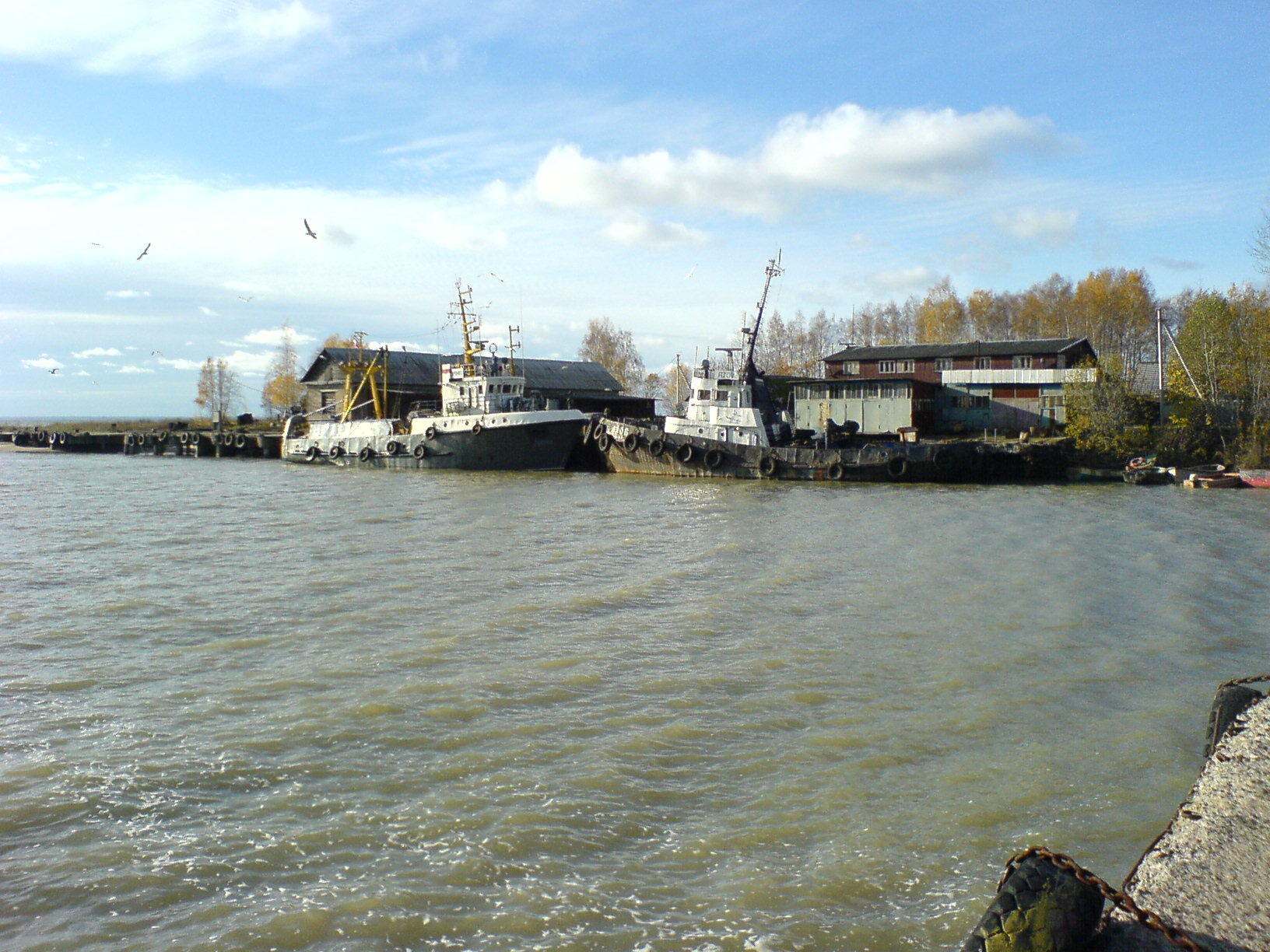
Fishing vessels in Vistino

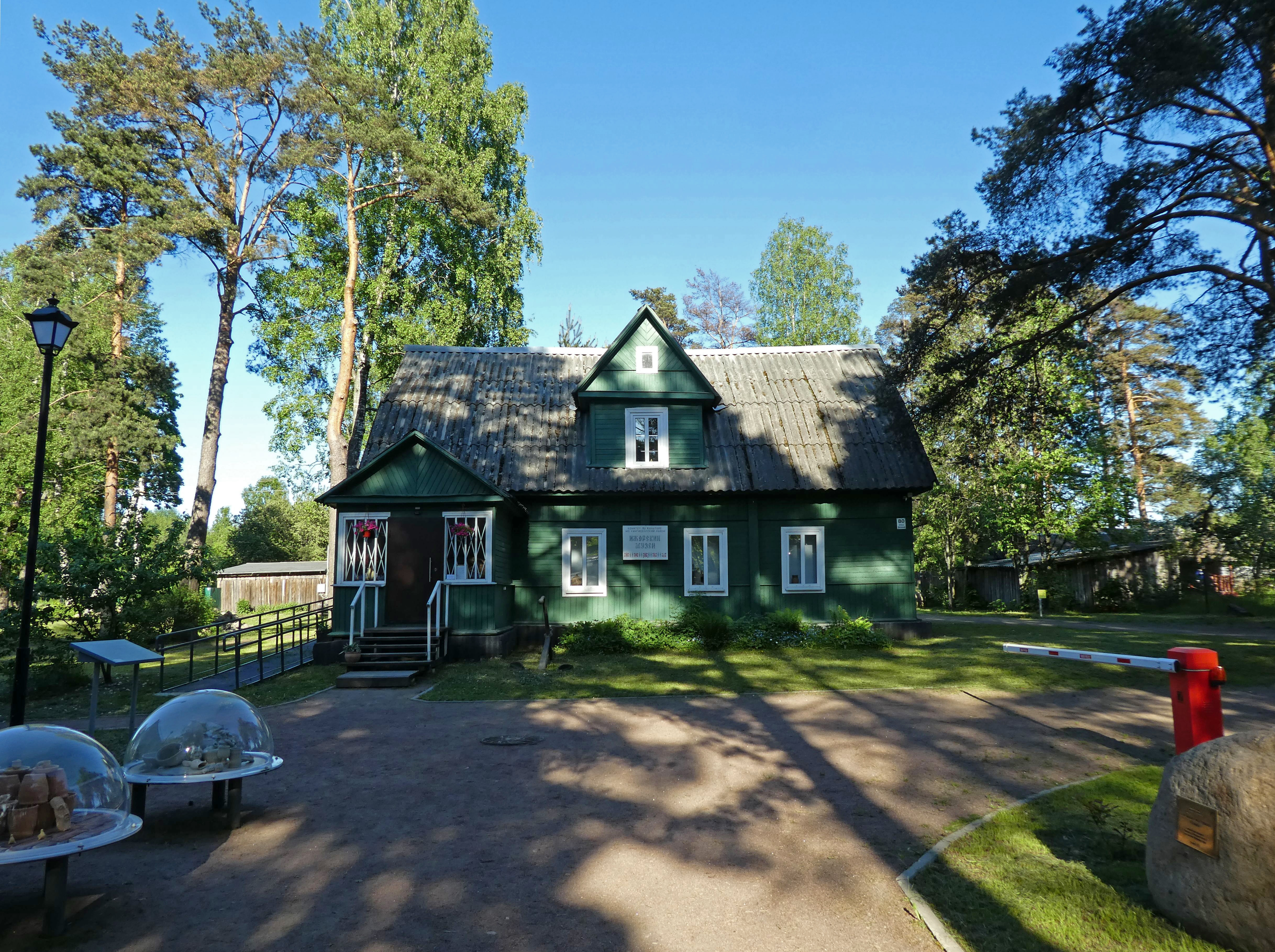
Vistino museum

Vistino (Russian: Вистино, Ingrian: Viistina, Finnish: Viistinä) is a rural locality (a village) in Kingiseppsky District of Leningrad Oblast, Russia. It is located in the west portion of the Soikinsky Peninsula, on the coast of the Gulf of Finland, roughly 150 kilometres (93 mi) by road southwest of the centre of St. Petersburg. Population: 991 (2007 est.).

The village has a museum dedicated to the Izhorian heritage of the region.

The Ust-Luga Multimodal Complex, an industrial zone, is planned to be built around Vistino.
