= Baltic LNG =

Baltic LNG is a liquefied natural gas plant under construction on the Gulf of Finland of the Baltic Sea in Ust-Luga, Leningrad Oblast, Russia. The plant's capacity would be 13 million tons of LNG per year. The planned launch date has changed many times, and according to the latest plans, the first line will start operating in 2024 and the second line in 2025. The cost of the project is estimated at 2.4 trillion rubles. On October 7, 2021, it was announced that the LNG plant might be expanded to three lines. The third line could be introduced by 2026, which would increase the plant's capacity to 20 million tons per year, reaching the capacity of Arctic LNG-2.

== History ==
Preparations of the original Baltic LNG project started in 2004. On 15 October 2004, Baltic LNG AG was registered in Baar, Switzerland (later in Zürich) as a joint venture of Gazprom and Sovkomflot. In 2005, Gazprom started to negotiate with Petro-Canada to construct the LNG plant and to conclude a supply agreement for LNG shipments to Canadian market. On 14 March 2006, Gazprom and Petro-Canada signed an agreement to proceed with initial engineering design of the Baltic LNG plant. It was agreed to ship LNG from the Baltic LNG plant to Petro-Canada's LNG regasification facility in Gros-Cacouna, Quebec.

In 2006, Gazprom started to look for other markets and partners inviting 17 energy companies from Europe, Asia and North America for negotiations. On 21 September 2007, Gazprom decided to continue work on the feasibility study, leaving it unclear when it would make a final decision whether to build the plant. On 7 February 2008, Gazprom terminated the project because it considered the Baltic LNG plant less competitive than other projects in the region — the Nord Stream 1 pipeline and the possible LNG facility of the Shtokman field.

The project was renewed in 2013. In January 2015 it was announced that the new location of the project would be near the Ust-Luga Port.

In October 2021, Gazprom and RusGazDobycha announced they would build a plant at Ust-Luga to process ethane-containing natural gas and a large-scale liquefied natural gas (LNG) production plant with a capacity of 13 million tons of LNG per year. High-ethane gas from the Tambeyskoye gas field and the Achimov and Valanginian deposits of the Nadym-Pur-Taz region will supply the plant.

== Original project ==
The original plant was to be built in Primorsk, Leningrad Oblast. The project foresaw a capacity of 5–7.2 million tonnes of LNG per year, depending on whether one or two LNG trains would be built. The LNG plant was expected to cost US$3.7 billion and it was to become operational by 2012. The technical design of the project was done by Giprospetsgaz, a subsidiary of Gazprom, and KBR, a subsidiary of Halliburton. The LNG plant was to be supplied from the Russian unified natural gas grid, including from the onshore section of Nord Stream pipeline, and from the Shtokman field.

The project was developed by Baltic LNG AG, a joint venture between Russian companies Gazprom (80% of shares) and Sovkomflot (20%). The head of the company was Alexander Krasnenkov. The plan was to involve foreign partner or partners into the project in terms that Gazprom could remain 51% of shares. In 2006, Gazprom invited 17 companies to participate, of which 15 showed interest. In April 2007, Gazprom shorted list to four companies. They were Petro-Canada, BP, Eni and Mitsubishi. In September 2007, media reported that also Spain's Iberdrola was talking with Gazprom about its participation in the project.

Later a renewed plan proposed the plant would be built near the Ust-Luga Port. It would have had two trains with total capacity of 10 million tonnes of LNG per year, with the option to add later an addition train to increase the capacity up to 15 million tonnes. The plant was expected to cost about US$18.5 billion. Potential partners of the project suggested include Royal Dutch Shell, Mitsui, and Mitsubishi.

== Risks ==
Gazprom has identified a number of risks related to the project. According to Igor Meshcherin, head of Gazprom's project evaluation directorate, environmental risks are the congested Gulf of Finland and Danish Straits, and ice conditions. Another risk was that there is not capacity in the unified natural gas system in the Leningrad Oblast, and the project might require expansion of the pipeline grid.

== See also ==
- Liquefied natural gas industry in Russia
