= Udria Landscape Conservation Area =

Protected area in Estonia

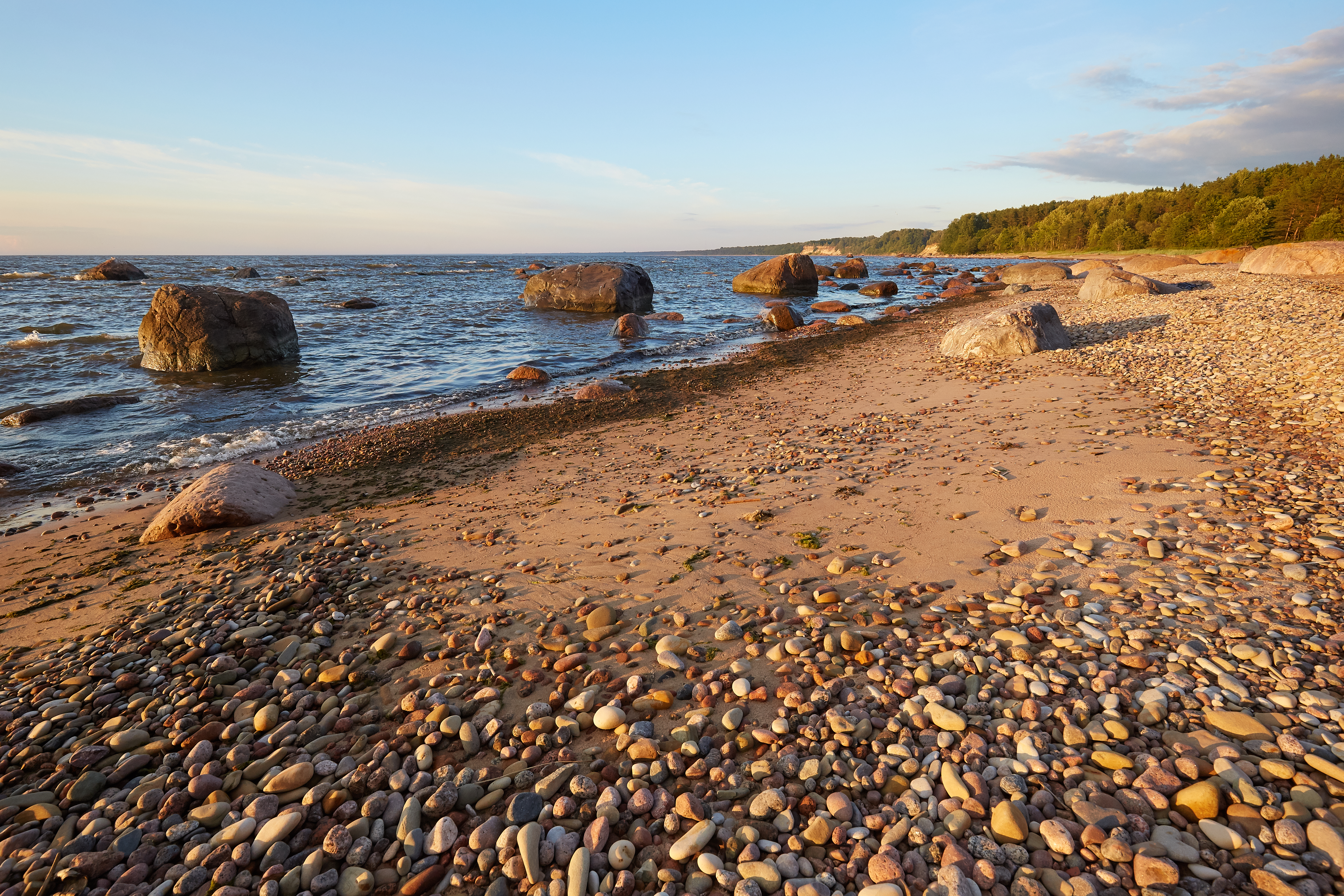

- Location within Estonia
- Location: Estonia
- Coordinates: 59°24′N 27°54′E
- Established: 1939

Udria Landscape Conservation Area is a nature park which is located in Ida-Viru County, Estonia.

The area of the nature park is 377 ha.

The protected area was founded in 1939 to protect Udria erratic boulders field on the coast of Narva Bay.
