= Narva Bay =

Bay in Estonia

Narva bay
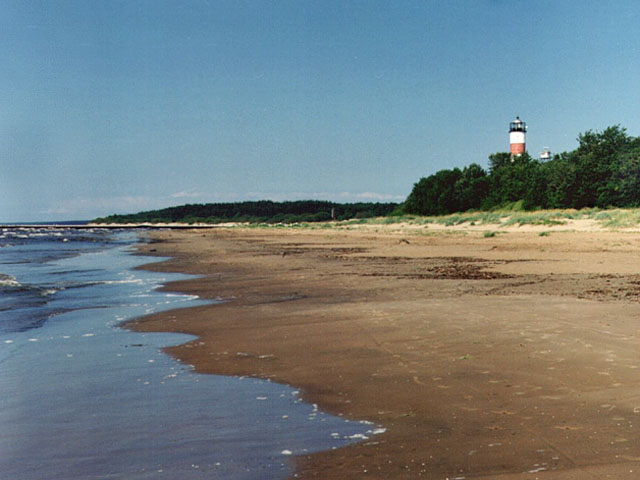
- A lighthouse on the Estonian coast.

- Location: Gulf of Finland; Baltic Sea
- Coordinates: 59°32′N 27°51′E
- Type: Bay
- Max. length: 40 kilometres (25 mi)

The Narva Bay (Estonian: Narva laht, Russian: Нарвский залив) (also the Gulf of Narva and the Narva Estuary) is a bay in the southern part of the Gulf of Finland divided between Estonia and Russia.

== Geography ==
The Kurgalsky Peninsula separates it from the Luga Bay to the east. The bay is about 40 kilometres (25 mi) long and 90 kilometres (56 mi) wide at its mouth. The eastern shore is low and sandy, while the south coast is rather steep. The bay is covered by ice from December to March. The Narva River flows into the bay near the town of Narva-Jõesuu.

== See also ==
- Udria Landscape Conservation Area
