= Baltic Pipeline System-II =

Second line of an oil transport system in the Baltic region

Location
- Country: Russia
- Province: Bryansk Oblast; Smolensk Oblast; Tver Oblast; Novgorod Oblast; Leningrad Oblast
- Start: Unecha
- Passes through: Smolensk
- To: Ust-Luga; Kirishi
- Runs alongside: Luga River

General information
- Type: Crude oil
- Operator: Transneft
- Construction started: 2009
- Commissioned: 2011

Technical information
- Length: 1,170 km (730 mi)
- Maximum discharge: 50 million tons per year
- No. of pumping stations: 8

The Baltic Pipeline System-2 (BPS-2, Russian: Балтийская трубопроводная система 2, БТС-2) is a second trunk line of the Baltic Pipeline System. The pipeline is constructed and operated by Russian oil pipeline company Transneft. The BPS-2 was completed in 2011 and began to function in late March 2012.

== History ==
The project was proposed after an oil transit dispute between Russia and Belarus at the beginning of January 2007, and was approved by the Russian government on 21 May 2007.

Although in April 2008 Russia's Ministry of Industry and Energy submitted a negative profitability report regarding the pipeline, Russia opted to develop its own infrastructure for exporting hydrocarbons, bypassing former Soviet transit countries. The main goal of the pipeline is to protect Russia and its partners from the transit countries' possible decisions to raise tariffs or siphon off hydrocarbons. On 1 December 2008, Prime Minister Vladimir Putin signed a resolution ordering construction.

The construction started on 10 June 2009. Construction was completed in October 2011. The opening of export terminal at Ust-Luga was postponed until 2012 due to damage by landslips.

== Route ==
The 1,170-kilometre (730 mi) long pipeline system runs from the Unecha junction of the Druzhba pipeline near the Russia–Belarus border to the Ust-Luga terminal on the Gulf of Finland. The length of the pipeline from Unecha to Ust-Luga is 998 kilometres (620 mi) and the length of the branch line to Kirishi oil refinery is 172 kilometres (107 mi). The pipeline passes Bryansk, Smolensk, Tver, Novgorod, and Leningrad regions.

== Technical description ==
The initial capacity of the pipeline at the first stage is 10 million tons of oil per year, which will be upgraded to 50 million tons during the second stage. Of this, 12 million tons will be transported to Ust-Luga and 12 million tons to Kirishi refinery. Diameter of the pipeline will vary between 1,020 and 1,067 millimetres (40 and 42 in).

The construction cost is estimated at US$4 billion. The second stage is expected to be completed by December 2013.

The pipeline will have eight pumping stations. During the first stage, two new pumping stations were built, and two pumping stations (in Unecha and Andreapol) were renovated. During the second stage, four new pumping stations will be added, and the pumping station No.7 will be equipped with a tank farm with a capacity of 80,000 cubic metres (2,800,000 cu ft). In addition, the oil terminal in Ust-Luga was built.

== See also ==
- Petroleum industry in Russia
