= Luga Bay =

Bay in Gulf of Finland, Russia

Coordinates: 59°45′N 28°20′E

The south coast of the Gulf of Finland.

The Luga Bay (Russian: Лужская губа) is a shallow bay near the southern Russian coast of the Gulf of Finland. It is free of ice 326 days a year. Kurgalsky Peninsula separates the bay from the Bay of Narva to the west, while the Soikinsky Peninsula separates it from the Koporye Bay to the east. The Luga River empties into the bay near Ust-Luga.
