= Tayturka =

Tayturka Тайтурка
- Urban-type settlement
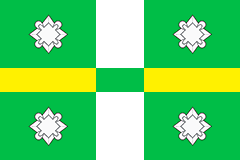
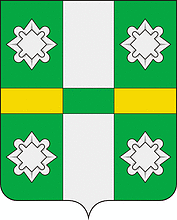
- Flag Coat of arms
- Interactive map of Tayturka
- Location of Tayturka Tayturka (Irkutsk Oblast)
- Coordinates: 52.8701°N 103.4658°E
- Country: Russia
- Federal subject: Irkutsk Oblast
- Administrative district: Usolsky District
- Founded: 1666
- Elevation: 421 m (1,381 ft)

Population (2010 Census)
  - Total: 4,892
  - Estimate (2025): 4,931 (+0.8%)
- Time zone: UTC+8 (MSK+5)
- Postal code: 665477
- OKTMO ID: 25640162051

Tayturka (Russian: Тайтурка) is an urban locality (an urban-type settlement) in Usolsky District of Irkutsk Oblast, Russia. Population: 4,892 (2010 census); 5,236 (2002 census); 6,107 (1989 Soviet census).
