= Murmansk LNG =

Gas plant in Murmansk, Russia

Murmansk LNG is a liquefied natural gas plant being built by the Russian gas producer Novatek. It was approved on 10 October 2023 by Russian president Vladimir Putin and is scheduled to begin operation in 2027.

== History ==
In December 2023 Murmansk LNG was included in Russia's national energy strategy.

In April 2024 Novatek reported its production targets until 2033.

In May 2024 it was revealed that Putin's son-in-law, Yevgeny Nagorny, was hired by Novatek's owner, Leonid Mikhelson, as director-general of Murmansk-Transgaz, which will transport the gas.

On 13 June 2024 the US threatened to sanction firms that dealt with Murmansk LNG, as part of its OFAC sanctions.

In July 2024 it was reported that Chinese shipbuilders had stopped work on Murmansk LNG-related contracts because of pressure under the US sanctions régime. In the same month, it was revealed that when the plant begins operation in 2027, it will have a capacity of 6.8MTPA, out of a planned 20.8MTPA.
