= Soikinsky Peninsula =

Group of settlement in Kingiseppsky District, Leningrad Oblast, Russia

Coordinates: 59°46′N 28°33′E

The south coast of the Gulf of Finland.

The Soikinsky Peninsula (Russian: Сойкино, Finnish: Soikkola, Ingrian: Soikkola) in Kingiseppsky District, Leningrad Oblast, Russia projects out into the Gulf of Finland, separating the Luga Bay from the Koporye Bay.

Its name is derived from the Izhorian word for the peninsula, itself probably derived from a proper name.

The most populous village, also known as Soikino, was destroyed during World War II. Currently the main settlement is Vistino, which has a museum dedicated to the Izhorian heritage of the region. An oil terminal is slated to be constructed at Vistino, starting from 2009.
