= Ust-Luga =

Ust-Luga Усть-Луга
- Village
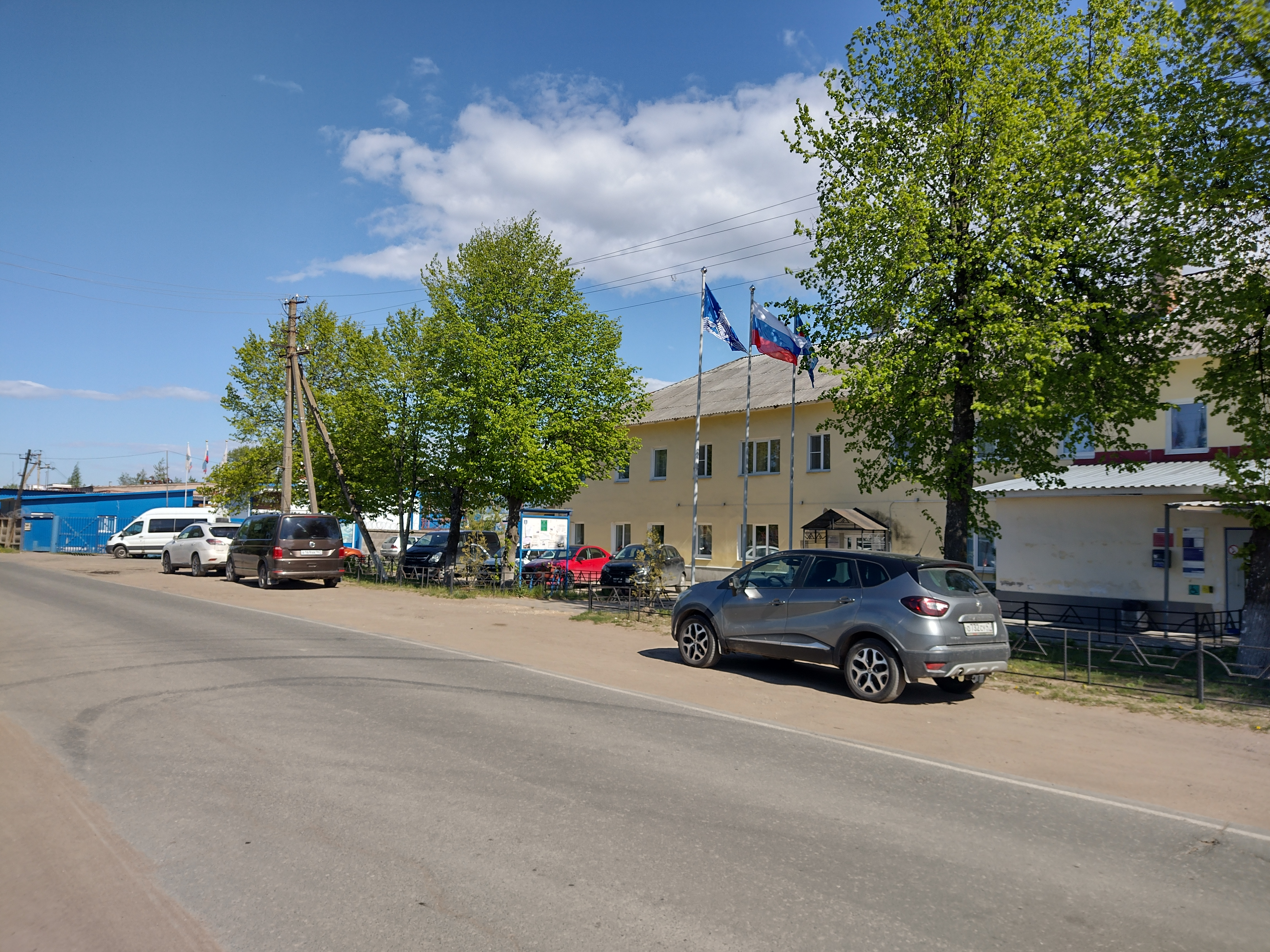
- Ust-Luga, 2022

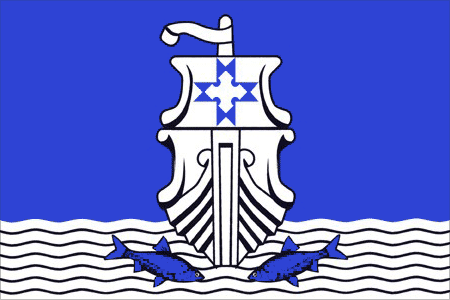
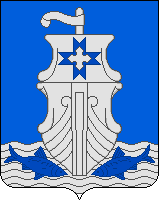
- Flag Coat of arms

- Location within Leningrad Oblast Location within Russia
- Coordinates: 59°39′37″N 28°16′37″E
- Country: Russia
- Region: Leningrad Oblast
- District: Kingiseppsky District
- Time zone: UTC+3:00

Ust-Luga (Russian: Усть-Луга, Finnish and Izhorian: Laukaansuu, Votic: Laugasuu; all meaning in English: “mouth of the River Luga”) is a settlement and railway station in Kingiseppsky District of Leningrad Oblast, Russia, near the Estonian border, situated on the River Luga near its entry into the Luga Bay of the Gulf of Finland, about 110 kilometres (68 mi) west of Saint Petersburg.

== Port of Ust-Luga ==
Ust-Luga is the site of an important coal and fertiliser terminal. Constructed at a cost of $2.1 billion, work started in 1997, in part to avoid having to ship dry cargo via the newly independent Baltic states, and was accelerated at the urging of President Vladimir Putin, who inaugurated the new port facilities in 2001. The 3,700-metre (4,000 yd) approach channel is capable of accommodating ships with a capacity of 150,000 tonnes and more. In May 2008, Putin confirmed that Ust-Luga would be the terminal of the projected Second Baltic Pipeline, an oil transportation route bypassing Belarus.

The Ust-Luga container terminal was opened in December 2011, and is operated by the National Container Company. The port adjoins the Ust-Luga Multimodal Complex, which allows for rapid freight handling on site. In 2018, the port handled 98.7 million tonnes of cargo.

In October 2021, Gazprom and RusGazDobycha announced they planned to build a plant at Ust-Luga to process ethane-containing natural gas, and a large-scale liquefied natural gas (LNG) production plant, Baltic LNG, with a capacity of 13 million tonnes of LNG per year. High-ethane gas from the Tambeyskoye gas field, and the Achimov and Valanginian deposits of the Nadym-Pur-Taz region, will supply the plant.

The Ust-Luga gas terminal, operated by Novatek, was attacked by a Ukrainian aerial drone on the night of 21 January 2024, as a part of the hostilities resulting from the Russian invasion of Ukraine, causing a fire that forced the suspension of some operations.

On 24 August 2025 Ukrainian drones again attacked and caused fire at the Novatek gas terminal. Social media videos showed damage to a fractionating column of the facility.

Another Ukrainian drone attack occurred on 25 March 2026. The smoke from the massive fire could be seen from Finland. The attack caused the suspension of oil loading. It was hit again four days later, on 29 March and during the night of 30 March, for the fifth time in ten days.

A further Ukrainian drone attack occurred in an overnight raid early on August 14, 2026, setting the terminal on fire again. It was reported in a Telegram post by the governor of Russia's Leningrad region, Alexander Drozdenko.

== Population ==
As of 2005, the population of Ust-Luga did not exceed 2,000, but the port administration expected it to grow to 34,000 by 2025.

== Gallery ==
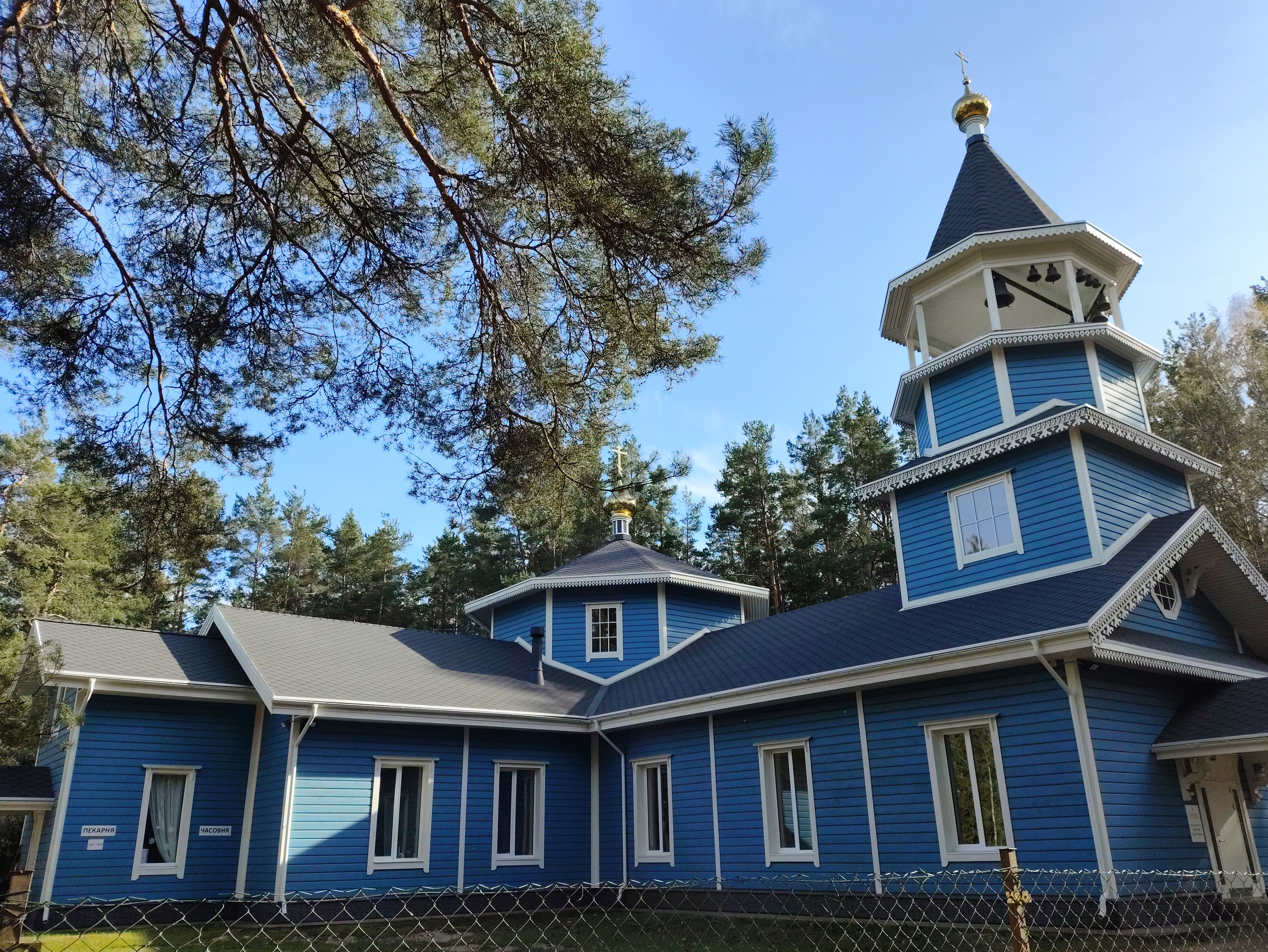
Church

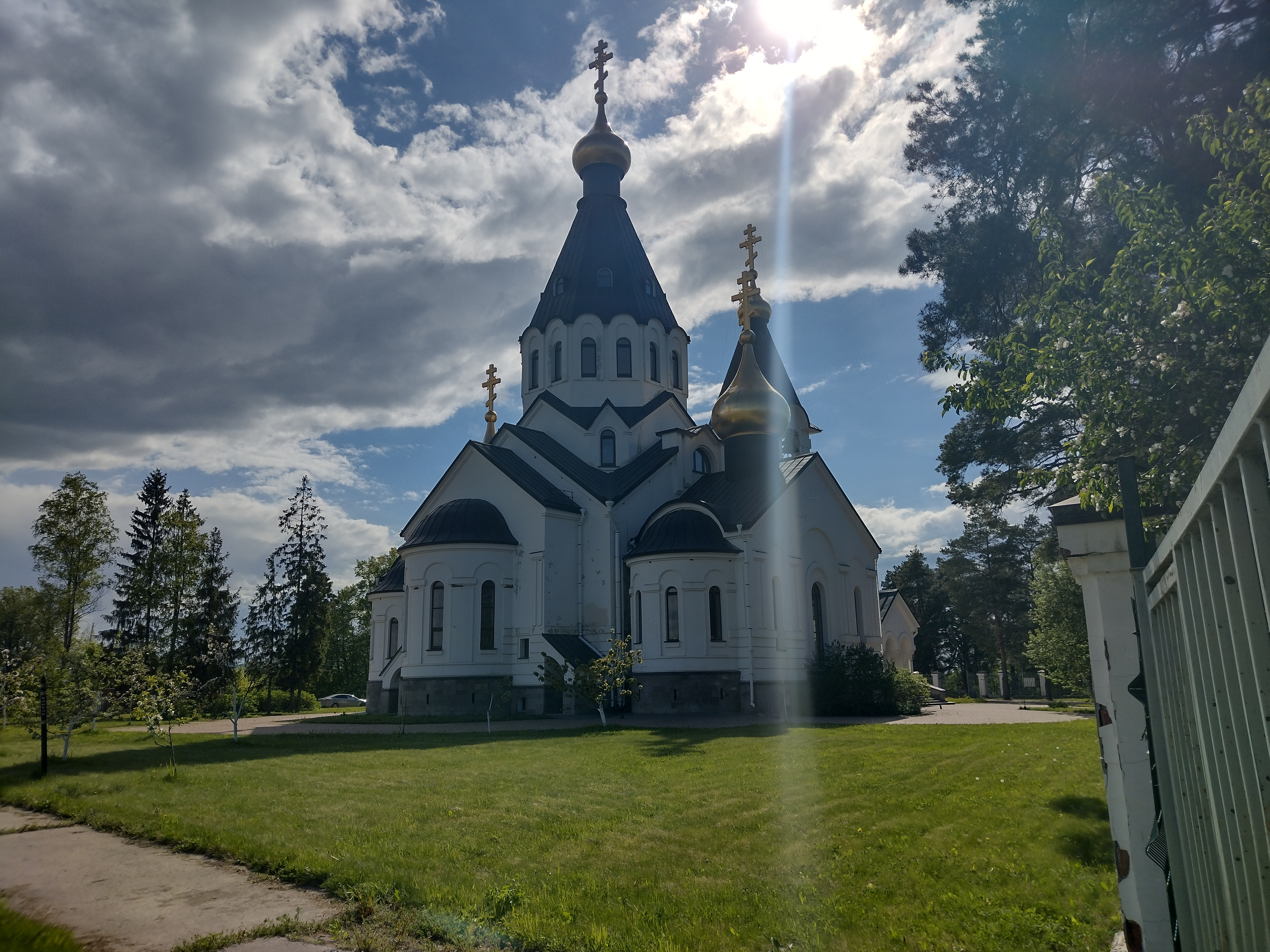
Cathedral

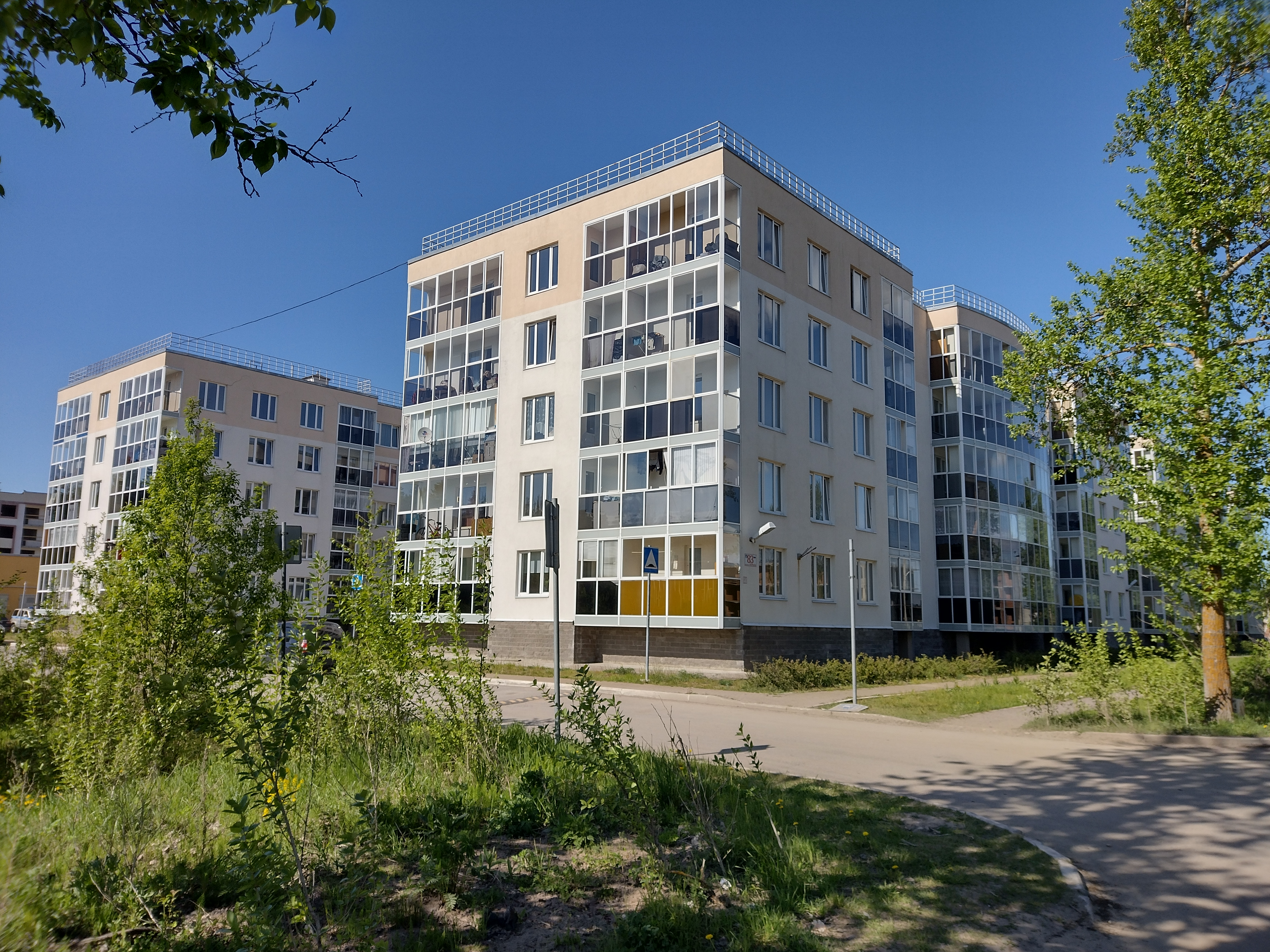
Residential area

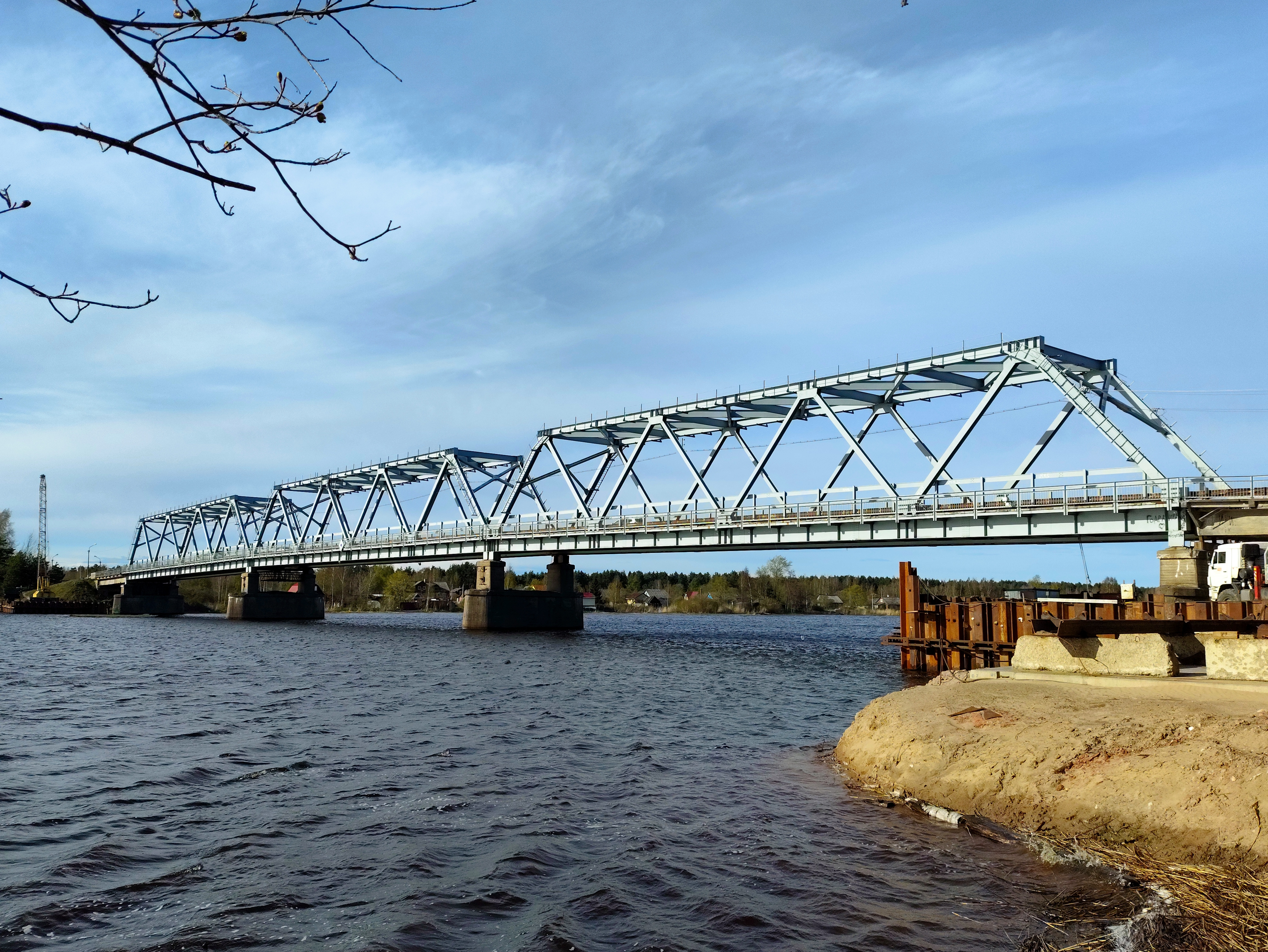
Bridge

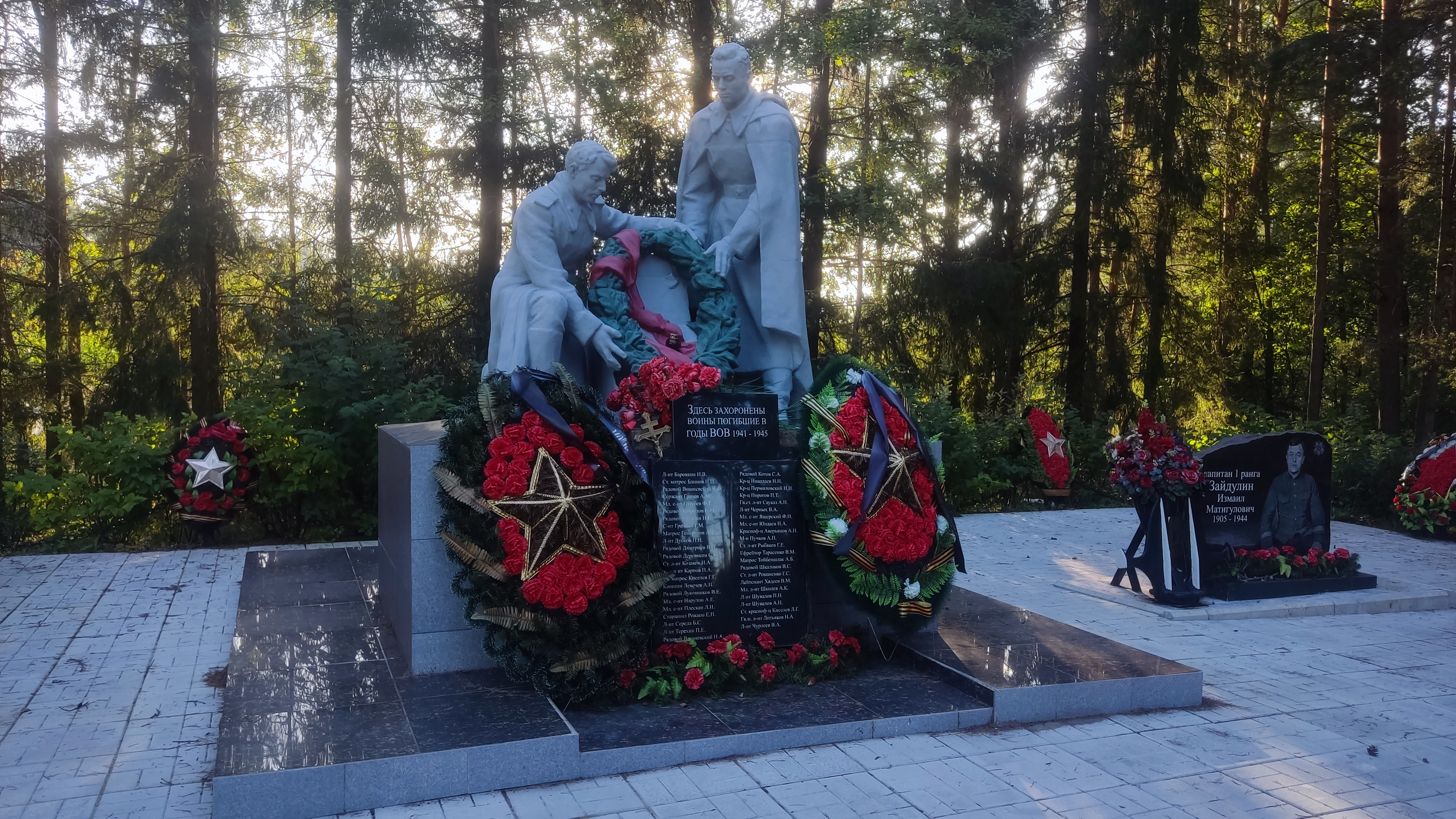
Monument

== See also ==
- Ports of the Baltic Sea
