= Armorial of Leningrad Oblast =

This article lists the heraldry of Leningrad Oblast, a federal subject of Russia, grouped into the regions administrative divisions.

== Oblast ==
Coat of arms of Leningrad Oblast

== Districts ==
Boksitogorsky District

Gatchinsky District

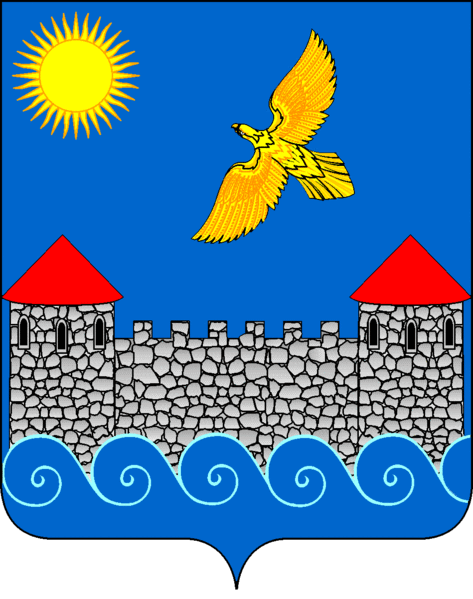
Kingiseppsky District

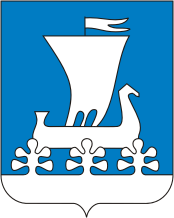
Kirishsky District

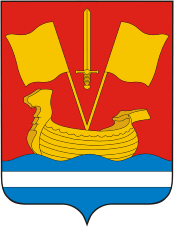
Kirovsky District

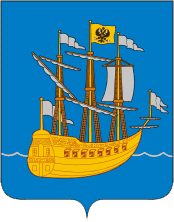
Lodeynopolsky District

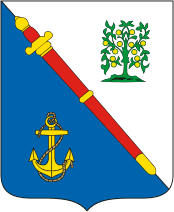
Lomonosovsky District

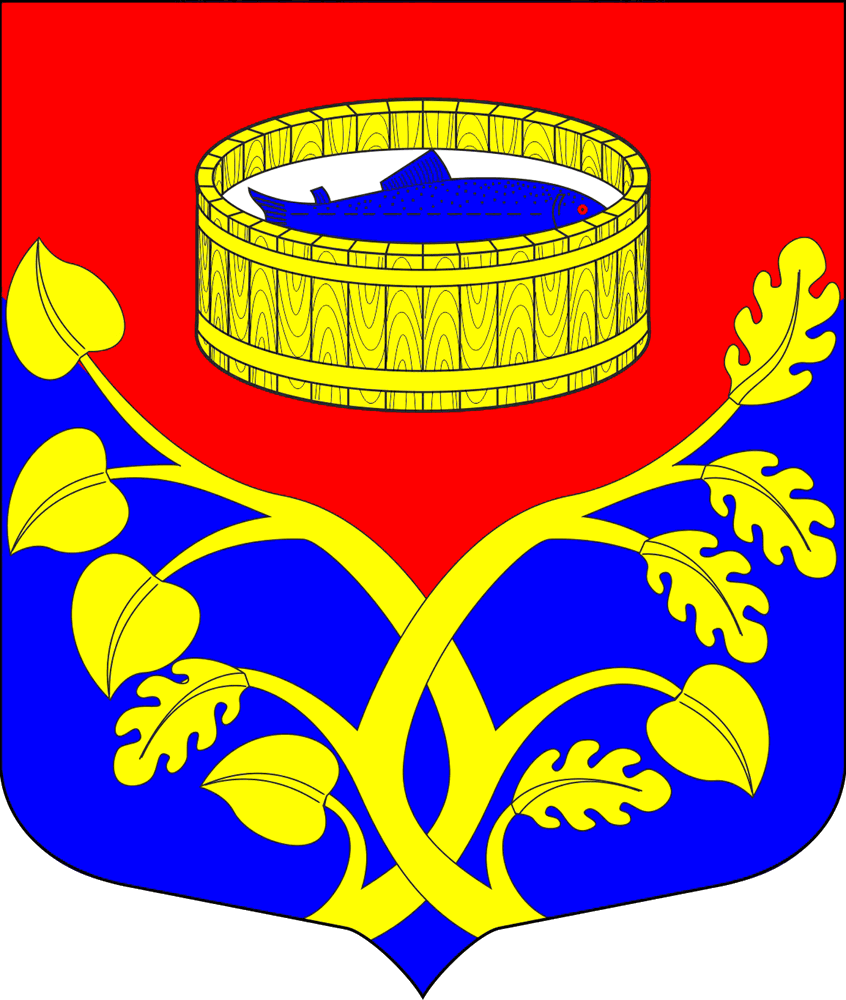
Luzhsky District

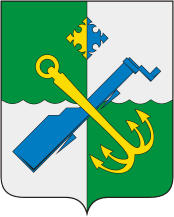
Podporozhsky District

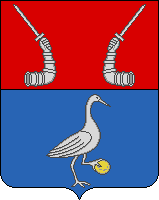
Priozersky District

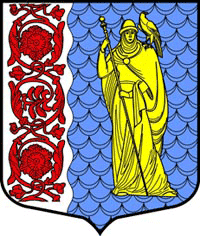
Slantsevsky District

Tikhvinsky District

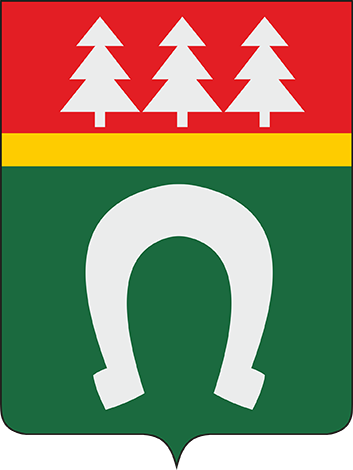
Tosnensky District

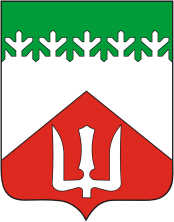
Volkhovsky District

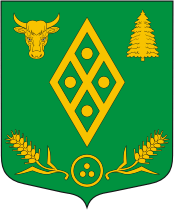
Volosovsky District

Vsevolozhsky District

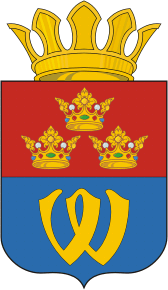
Vyborgsky District

== Cities and towns ==
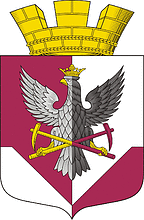
Boksitogorsk

Gatchina

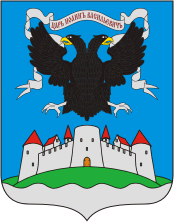
Ivangorod

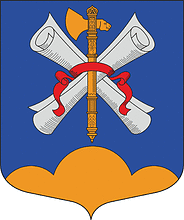
Kamennogorsk

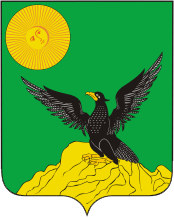
Kingisepp

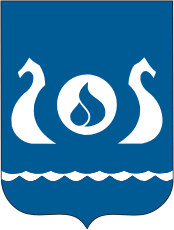
Kirishi

Kirovsk

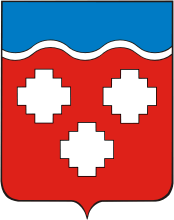
Kommunar

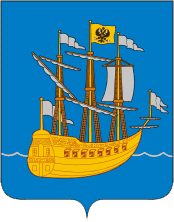
Lodeynoye Pole

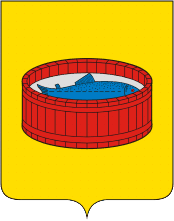
Luga

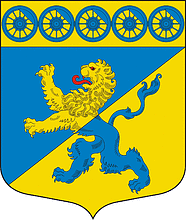
Lyuban

Murino

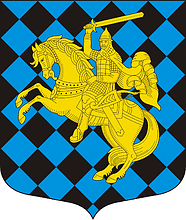
Nikolskoye

Novaya Ladoga

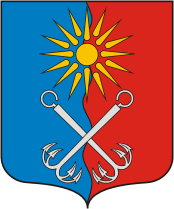
Otradnoe

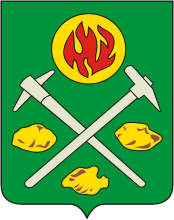
Pikalyovo

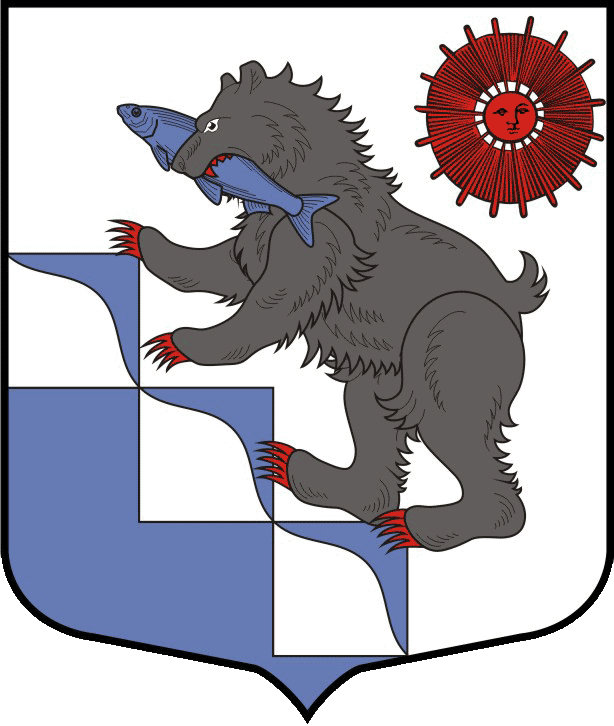
Podporozhye

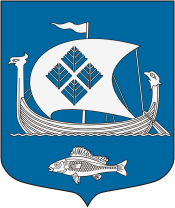
Primorsk

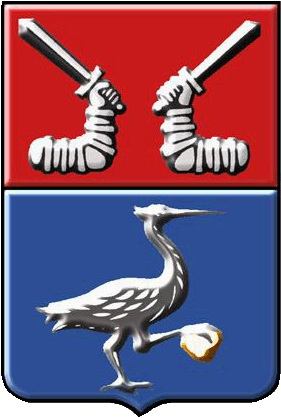
Priozersk

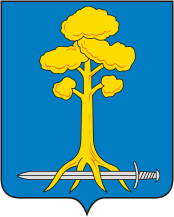
Sertolovo

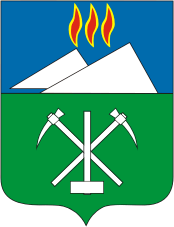
Slantsy

Svetogorsk

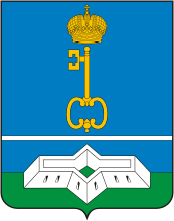
Shlisselburg

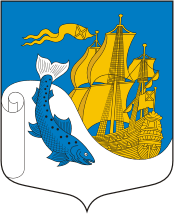
Syasstroy

Tikhvin

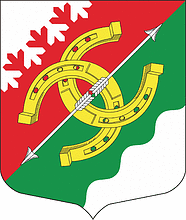
Tosno

Volosovo

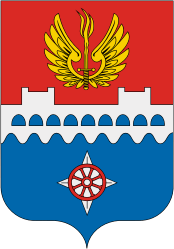
Volkhov

Vsevolozhsk

Vyborg

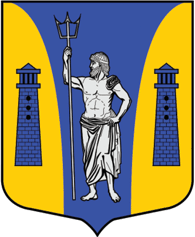
Vysotsk

== Town of oblast significance ==
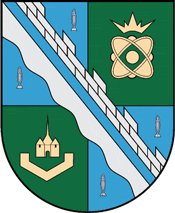
Sosnovy Bor

== Urban-type settlements ==
Nevskaya Dubrovka

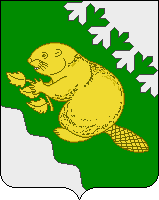
Lesogorsky

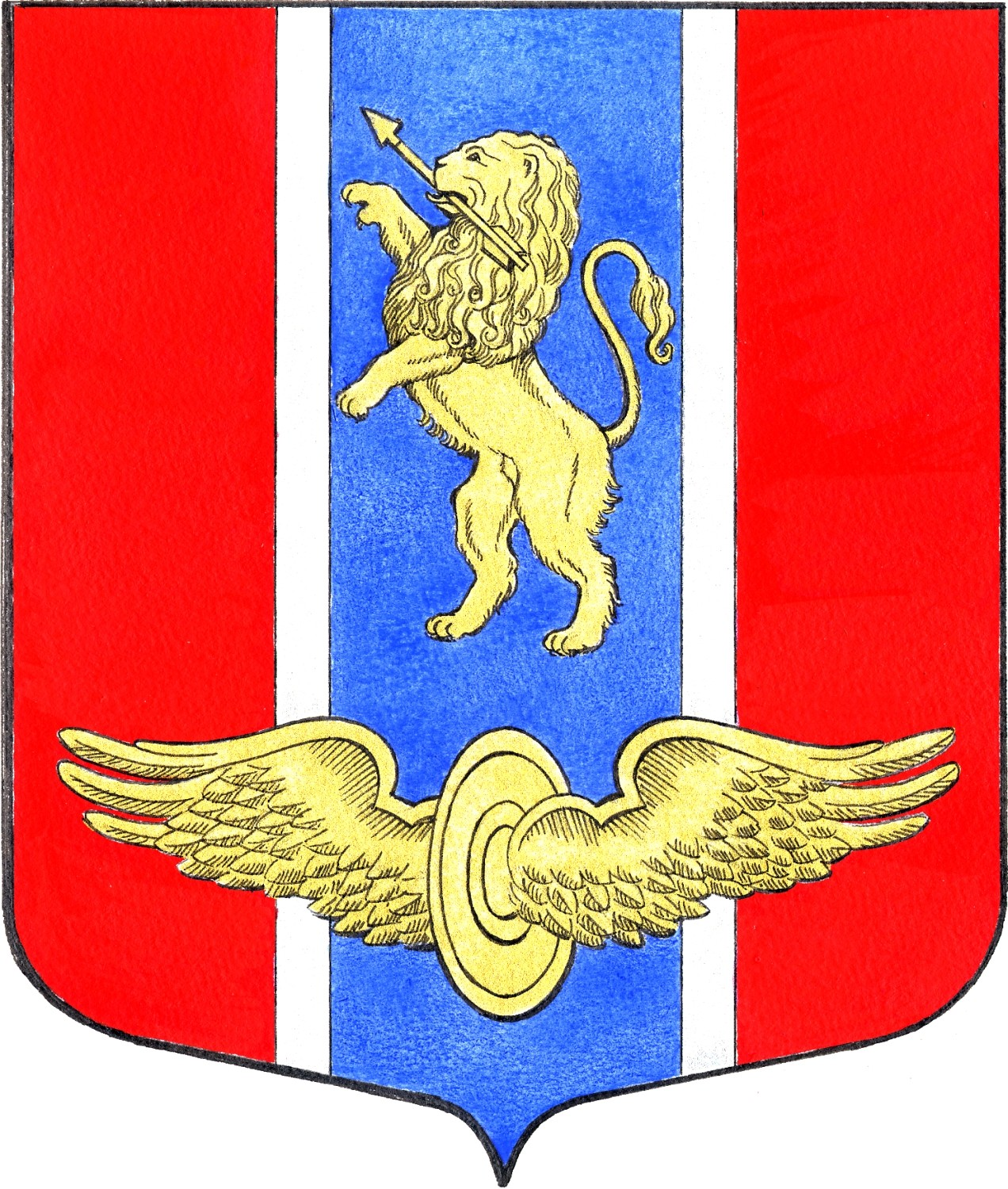
Mga

Morozovka

Naziya

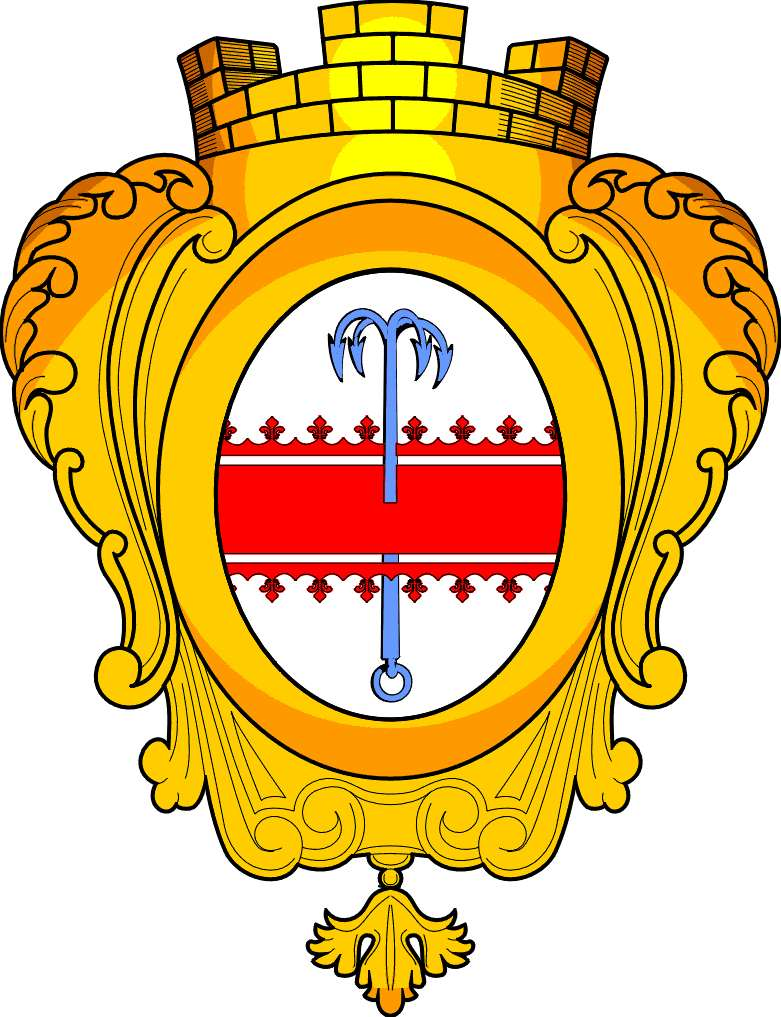
Nikolsky

Roshchino

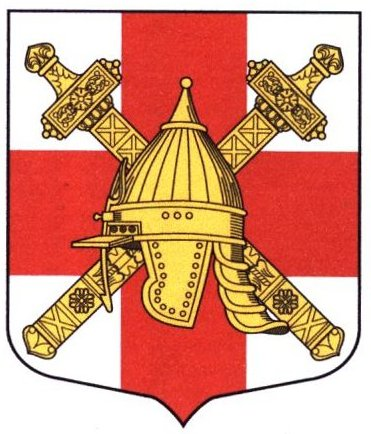
Sinyavino

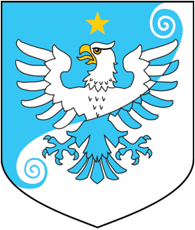
Sovetskoe

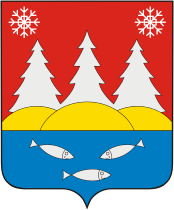
Toksovo

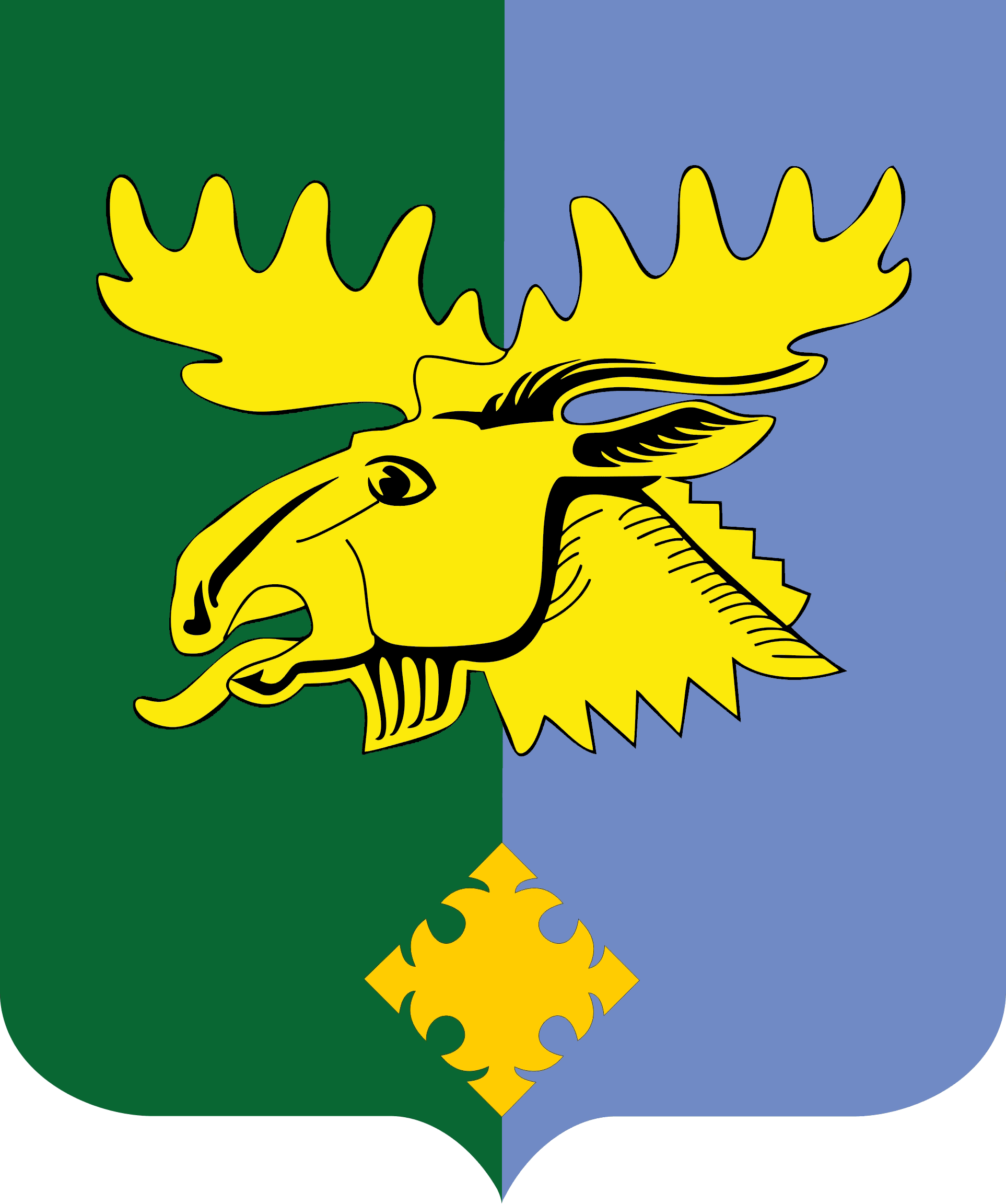
Vazhiny

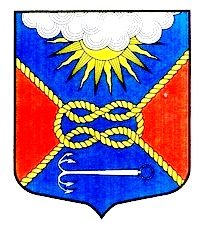
Voznesenye

== Rural settlements ==
Bugry

Domozhirovskoe

Falileevsky

Fyodorovskoye

Glazhevskoye

Glebychevskoye

Gorkovskoye

Goncharovskoye

Kobrino

Krasnoselskoe

Kuzemkino

Larionovskoe

Melnikovo

Nezhnovo

Novoye Devyatkino

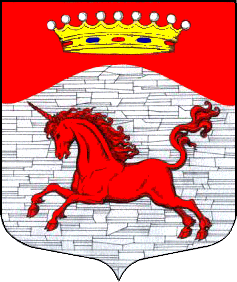
Opolye

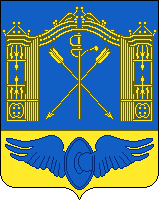
Oredezhskoye

Peniki

Pervomayskoe

Polyany

Romashkinskoe

Ropshinskoe

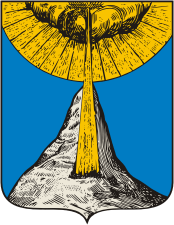
Rozhdestveno

Russko-Vysotskoye

Seleznevo

Selivanovo

Shugozero

Staraya Ladoga

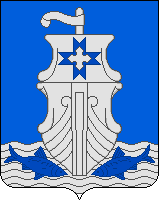
Ust-Luga

Vinnitsy

Vistino

Yam-Tyosovskoe

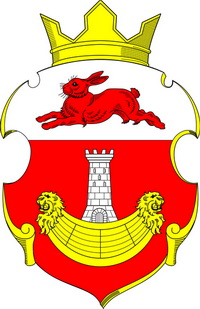
Yanegskoye

Zaporozhskoye

== See also ==
- Armorial of Russia
