= Administrative divisions of Leningrad Oblast =

Leningrad Oblast Russia
- Administrative center: St. Petersburg (unofficial)

Administrative structure (as of 2014)
- Districts: 17
- Cities/towns: 32
- Urban-type settlements: 32
- Selsovets: 205

Municipal structure (as of 2002)
- Rural settlements: 2,908 (inhabited); 137 (uninhabited)

Administratively, Leningrad Oblast is divided into seventeen districts and a town of oblast significance, Sosnovy Bor. Lomonosovsky District is the only one in Russia which has its administrative center (the town of Lomonosov) located in the area of a different subject of Russian Federation (the federal city of Saint Petersburg, which is not a part of Leningrad Oblast).

In terms of the area, the biggest administrative district is Podporozhsky District (7,706 square kilometres (2,975 mi^{2})); the smallest one is Lomonosovsky District (1,919 square kilometres (741 mi^{2})).

== Administrative and municipal divisions ==
Map

Division	Structure		OKATO	OKTMO	Urban-type settlement/ district-level town*	Rural (volost)
Division	Administrative	Municipal	OKATO	OKTMO	Urban-type settlement/ district-level town*	Rural (volost)
Sosnovy Bor (Сосновый Бор)	city	urban okrug	41 454	41 754		
Boksitogorsky (Бокситогорский)	district		41 203	41 603	Boksitogorsk (Бокситогорск) town*; Pikalyovo (Пикалёво) town*; Yefimovsky (Ефимовский)	14
Volosovsky (Волосовский)	district		41 206	41 606	Volosovo (Волосово) town*	14
Volkhovsky (Волховский)	district		41 209	41 609	Novaya Ladoga (Новая Ладога) town*; Syasstroy (Сясьстрой) town*; Volkhov (Волхов) town*	15
Vsevolozhsky (Всеволожский)	district		41 212	41 612	Vsevolozhsk (Всеволожск) town*; Kudrovo (Кудрово) town*; Murino (Мурино) town*; Sertolovo (Сертолово) town*; Dubrovka (Дубровка); Imeni Morozova (Имени Морозова); Imeni Sverdlova (Имени Свердлова); Kuzmolovsky (Кузьмоловский); Rakhya (Рахья); Toksovo (Токсово); Yanino-1 (Янино-1)	12
Vyborgsky (Выборгский)	district		41 215	41 615	Kamennogorsk (Каменногорск) town*; Primorsk (Приморск) town*; Svetogorsk (Светогорск) town*; Vyborg (Выборг) town*; Vysotsk (Высоцк) town*; Lesogorsky (Лесогорский); Roshchino (Рощино); Sovetsky (Советский)	22
Gatchinsky (Гатчинский)	district		41 218	41 618	Gatchina (Гатчина) town*; Kommunar (Коммунар) town*; Druzhnaya Gorka (Дружная Горка); Siversky (Сиверский); Taytsy (Тайцы); Vyritsa (Вырица)	17
Kingiseppsky (Кингисеппский)	district		41 221	41 621	Ivangorod (Ивангород) town*; Kingisepp (Кингисепп) town*	9
Kirishsky (Киришский)	district		41 224	41 624	Kirishi (Кириши) town*; Budogoshch (Будогощь)	6
Kirovsky (Кировский)	district		41 225	41 625	Kirovsk (Кировск) town*; Otradnoye (Отрадное) town*; Shlisselburg (Шлиссельбург) town*; Mga (Мга); Naziya (Назия); Pavlovo (Павлово); Priladozhsky (Приладожский); Sinyavino (Синявино)	5
Lodeynopolsky (Лодейнопольский)	district		41 227	41 627	Lodeynoye Pole (Лодейное Поле) town*; Svirstroy (Свирьстрой)	8
Lomonosovsky (Ломоносовский)	district		41 230	41 630	Bolshaya Izhora (Большая Ижора); Lebyazhye (Лебяжье)	13
Luzhsky (Лужский)	district		41 233	41 633	Luga (Луга) town*; Tolmachyovo (Толмачёво)	19
Podporozhsky (Подпорожский)	district		41 236	41 636	Podporozhye (Подпорожье) town*; Nikolsky (Никольский); Vazhiny (Важины); Voznesenye (Вознесенье)	7
Priozersky (Приозерский)	district		41 239	41 639	Priozersk (Приозерск) town*; Kuznechnoye (Кузнечное)	12
Slantsevsky (Сланцевский)	district		41 242	41 642	Slantsy (Сланцы) town*	7
Tikhvinsky (Тихвинский)	district		41 245	41 645	Tikhvin (Тихвин) town*	13
Tosnensky (Тосненский)	district		41 248	41 648	Lyuban (Любань) town*; Nikolskoye (Никольское) town*; Tosno (Тосно) town*; Fornosovo (Форносово); Krasny Bor (Красный Бор); Ryabovo (Рябово); Ulyanovka (Ульяновка)	12

== Differences with municipal divisions ==
The municipal divisions of Leningrad Oblast are identical with its administrative divisions. All of the administrative districts of Leningrad Oblast are municipally incorporated as municipal districts, and the city of oblast significance is municipally incorporated as an urban okrug.

== History ==
=== Until 1927 ===
December 29 [O.S. December 18], 1708 Tsar Peter the Great issued an edict which established seven governorates. The description of the borders of the governorates was not given; instead, their area was defined as a set of towns and the lands adjacent to those towns. The present area of Leningrad oblast was a part of Ingermanland Governorate, which was renamed Saint Petersburg Governorate in 1710. The governorates were subdivided into uyezds, and uyezds into volosts. Eventually, parts of Saint Petersburg Governorate were split off to form separate governorates, such as Novgorod, Pskov, or Olonets Governorates. Vyborg Governorate, which was split off early, in 1812 was included into the Grand Duchy of Finland as the Viipuri Province, and in 1918 became a part of independent Finland. In 1913, Saint Petersburg Governorate was renamed Petrograd, and in 1924 Leningrad Governorate.

The east and south of the current area of the oblast was transferred in 1727 to Moscow and Novgorod Governorates. After a sequence of administrative reforms, the northeastern part of the oblast ended up in 1801 in Olonets Governorate. In June 1918, five uyezds of Novgorod Governorate, including Tikhvinsky Uyezd, were split off to form Cherepovets Governorate, with the administrative center in Cherepovets. In 1922, Olonets Governorate was abolished, and Lodeynopolsky Uyezd (which contained all areas later transferred to Leningrad Oblast) was transferred to Petrograd Governorate. Thus, by 1927 the current area of the oblast was split between three governorates — Leningrad, Novgorod, and Cherepovets.

Additionally, the areas adjacent to the Narva River, including the town of Ivangorod, were assigned to Estonia in 1920, following the Estonian War of Independence and the Treaty of Tartu, signed on February 2, 1920.

=== 1927—1944 ===
On August 1, 1927 the governorate was abolished, and uyezds were merged into newly established Leningrad Oblast, with the administrative center in Leningrad, which included the northwestern part of Russian Federation. The oblast was subdivided into 140 districts, which were grouped into nine okrugs,

- Borovichi Okrug (with the seat located in Borovichi);
- Cherepovets Okrug (Cherepovets);
- Leningrad Okrug (Leningrad);
- Lodeynoye Pole Okrug (Lodeynoye Pole);
- Luga Okrug (Luga);
- Murmansk Okrug (Murmansk);
- Novgorod Okrug (Veliky Novgorod);
- Pskov Okrug (Pskov);
- Velikiye Luki Okrug (Velikiye Luki).

Murmansk Okrug was not contiguous with the rest of Leningrad Oblast and was separated from it by the territory of the Karelian Autonomous Soviet Socialist Republic. The areas where Leningrad Oblast was established belonged previously not only to Saint Petersburg, Novgorod, and Cherepovets Governorates, but also to Murmansk and Pskov Governorates.

The following districts have been established,

- In Borovichi Okrug: Belsky, Bologovsky, Borovichsky, Konchansky, Minetsky, Moshenskoy, Okulovsky, Opechensky, Orekhovsky, Rozhdestvensky, Torbinsky, Uglovsky, and Valdaysky.
- In Cherepovets Okrug: Abakanovsky, Babayevsky, Belozersky, Borisovo-Sudsky, Cherepovetsky, Kaduysky, Kirillovsky, Myaksinsky, Nikolsko-Torzhsky, Pestovsky, Petrinyovsky, Petropavlovsky, Prisheksninsky, Sholsky, Ulomsky, Ustyzhensky, Vashkinsky, Verkhne-Chagodoshhensky, and Yefimovsky.
- In Leningrad Okrug: Andreyevsky, Budogoshchensky, Detskoselsky, Kapshinsky, Kingiseppsky, Kolpinsky, Kotelsky, Kuyvozovsky, Leninsky, Lyubansky, Mginsky, Moloskovitsky, Oraniyenbaumsky, Pargolovsky, Pikalyovsky, Tikhvinsky, Trotsky, Uritsky, Volosovsky, Volkhovsky, and Zhukovsky.
- In Lodeynoye Pole Okrug: Andomsky, Kovzhinsky, Lodeynopolsky, Oshtinsky, Pashsky, Podporozhsky, Shapshinsky, Vinnitsky, Voznesensky, Vytegorsky.
- In Luga Okrug: Batetsky, Gdovsky, Luzhsky, Lyadsky, Oredezhsky, Osminsky, Plyussky, Polnovsky, Rudnensky, Strugo-Krasnensky, and Utorgoshsky.
- In Murmansk Okrug: Aleksandrovsky, Kolsko-Loparsky, Lovozersky, Ponoysky, Teribersky, and Tersky.
- In Novgorod Okrug: Belebyolkovsky, Bronnitsky, Chyornovsky, Chudovsky, Demyansky, Krestetsky, Luzhensky, Malovishersky, Medvedsky, Molvotitsky, Novgorodsky, Poddorsky, Podgoshchsky, Polnovo-Seligersky, Polskoy, Soletsky, Starorussky, Volotovsky, and Zaluchsky.
- In Pskov Okrug: Bezhanitsky, Chikhachyovsky, Dedovichsky, Dnovsky, Karamyshevsky, Krasnogorodsky, Kudeversky, Novorzhevsky, Novoselsky, Opochetsky, Ostrovsky, Palkinsky, Porkhovsky, Pskovsky, Pushkinsky, Seryodkinsky, Slavkovsky, and Vyborsky.
- In Velikiye Luki Okrug: Bologovsky, Idritsky, Ilyinsky, Kholmsky, Kunyinsky, Leninsky, Loknyansky, Nasvinsky, Nevelsky, Novosokolnichesky, Oktyabrsky, Ostashkovsky, Penovsky, Porechyevsky, Pustoshkinsky, Rykovsky, Sebezhsky, Sovetsky, Toropetsky, Troitsky, Tsevelsky, Usmynsky, Ust-Dolyssky, Usvyatsky, Velizhsky, and Velikoluksky.

On October 1, 1929 Velikiye Luki Okrug was transferred to newly established Western Oblast. On August 15, 1930, the okrugs were abolished as well (with the exception of Murmansk Okrug), and the districts were directly subordinated to the oblast. Subsequently, the administrative divisions were merged and split on a regular basis, so that some districts were abolished, and others were established. On September 23, 1937 Vologda Oblast was established, and eastern districts of Leningrad Oblast were transferred to Vologda Oblast. On May 28, 1938 Murmansk Oblast was established, and the districts which belonged to Murmansk Okrug were transferred there. Between 1938 and 1944, the area of Leningrad Oblast approximately corresponded to the current area of Leningrad, Pskov, and Novgorod Oblasts.

On March 22, 1935 Pskov and Kingisepp Okrugs, adjacent to the state borders, were established. In September 1940, both were abolished.

After the Winter War in 1940, some areas which previously belonged to independent Finland were ceded to the Soviet Union, in particular, to Leningrad Oblast and to the Karelo-Finnish Soviet Socialist Republic.

During World War II, considerable areas of Leningrad Oblast were occupied by German and Finnish troops and thus were outside the jurisdiction of the oblast.

=== After 1944 ===
On July 5, 1944, Novgorod Oblast, and on August 23, 1944 Pskov Oblast were established. The areas of Estonia adjacent to the Narva River, including the town of Ivangorod, were transferred to Leningrad Oblast on November 24, 1944. They were shared between Slantsevsky (south) and Kingiseppsky (north) Districts. On the same day some areas, which are now parts of Vyborgsky and Priozersky Districts, were transferred from the Karelo-Finnish Soviet Socialist Republic to Leningrad Oblast. In 1948–1949, most of the names of Finnish origin were replaced by made-up Russian names. After 1944, some areas which belonged to Leningrad Oblast, were on several occasions transferred to the federal city of Saint Petersburg.

=== Abolished districts ===
After 1927 (with the exception of the aborted reform of 1963–1965) borders between the districts sometimes were modified, and as a result some of the districts were abolished. This list includes the districts which existed in the current area of Leningrad Oblast.

- Budogoshchensky District (the administrative center in the urban-type settlement of Budogoshch), established in 1927, abolished in 1932, split between Dregelsky and Kirishsky Districts.
- Detskoselsky District (the town of Detskoye Selo), established in 1927, abolished in 1930, split between Tosnensky, Krasnogvardeysky, and Leningradsky Prigorodny Districts.
- Kapshinsky District (the settlement of Shugozero), established in 1927, abolished in 1963, split between Boksitogorsky and Tikhvinsky Districts.
- Kolpinsky District (the town of Kolpino), established in 1927, abolished in 1930, split between Tosnensky and Leningradsky Prigorodny Districts.
- Kotelsky District (the selo of Kotly), established in 1927, abolished in 1931, merged into Kingiseppsky District.
- Krasnoselsky District (the town of Krasnoye Selo), established in 1936, abolished in 1955, merged into Lomonosovsky District.
- Leningradsky Prigorodny District (the city of Leningrad), established in 1930, abolished in 1936, split between the city of Leningrad, and Krasnoselsky, Slutsky, Pargolovsky, Vsevolozhsky, and Mginsky Districts.
- Leninsky District (the settlement of Vsevolozhskoye), established in 1927, abolished in 1930, merged into Leningradsky Prigorodny District.
- Lesogorsky District (the urban-type settlement of Lesogorsky), established in 1940 as Yaskinsky District and a part of the Karelian ASSR, later of the Karelo-Finnish Soviet Socialist Republic, transferred to Leningrad Oblastin 1944, renamed in 1948, abolished in 1960, merged into Vyborgsky District.
- Lyubansky District (the town of Lyuban), established in 1927, abolished in 1930, merged into Tosnensky District.
- Mginsky District (the settlement of Mga), established in 1927, abolished in 1960, split between Volkhovsky and Tosnensky Districts. In 1930 and 1931 was known as Putilovsky District. The current borders of Kirovsky District largely coincide with those of Mginsky District.
- Moloskovitsky District (the village of Moloskovitsy), established in 1927, abolished in 1931, merged into Volosovsky District.
- Novoladozhsky District (the town of Novaya Ladoga), established in 1946, abolished in 1963, merged into Volkhovsky District.
- Oredezhsky District (the settlement of Oredezh), established in 1927, abolished in 1959, split between Luzhsky and Gatchinsky Districts.
- Osminsky District (the selo of Osmino), established in 1927, abolished in 1961, split between Slantsevsky and Volosovsky Districts.
- Oyatsky District (the selo of Alyokhovshchina), established in 1927 as Shapshinsky District, in the same year renamed Oyatsky District, abolished in 1955, merged into Lodeynopolsky District.
- Pargolovsky District (the settlement of Pargolovo III), established in 1927, abolished in 1930, split between Kuyvozovsky District and Leningradsky Prigorodny District. Re-established in 1936, abolished in 1954, split between the city of Leningrad and Vsevolozhsky District.
- Pashsky District (the village of Pashsky Perevoz), established in 1927, abolished in 1955, merged into Novoladozhsky District.
- Pavlovsky District (the town of Pavlovsk), established in 1936 as Slutsky District, renamed in 1944 into Pavlovsky District, abolished in 1953, split between the city of Leningrad, Gatchinsky, and Tosnensky Districts.
- Pikalyovsky District (the selo of Pikalyovo), established in 1927, abolished in 1932, split between Yefimovsky, Tikhvinsky, Dregelsky, Kapshinsky, and Khvoyninsky Districts.
- Primorsky District (the town of Primorsk), established in 1940 as Koyvistovsky District, renamed in 1948, abolished in 1954, merged into Roshchinsky District.
- Roshchinsky District (the selo of Roshchino), established in 1940 as Kannelyarvsky District, renamed Rayvolovsky District in 1945, renamed Roshchinsky District in 1948, abolished in 1963, merged into Vyborgsky District.
- Rudnensky District (the selo of Rudno, subsequently in the village of Vyskatka), established in 1927, abolished in 1933, split between Gdovsky and Osminsky Districts.
- Sosnovsky District (the suburban settlement of Sosnovo), established in 1940 as Rautovsky District, renamed in 1948, abolished in 1960, split between Roshchinsky and Priozersky Districts.
- Toksovsky District (the village of Kuyvoz, later in the urban-type settlement of Toksovo), established in 1927 as Kuyvozovsky District, renamed in 1936, abolished in 1939, merged into Pargolovsky District.
- Uritsky District (the town of Uritsk), established in 1927, abolished in 1930, merged into Leningradsky Prigorodny District.
- Vinnitsky District (the selo of Vinnitsy), established in 1927, abolished in 1963, merged into Lodeynopolsky District, in 1965 became a part of re-established Podporozhsky District.
- Voznesensky District (the selo of Voznesenye), established in 1927, abolished in 1954, merged into Podporozhsky District.
- Yefimovsky District (the settlement of Yefimovsky), established in 1927, abolished in 1963, merged into Boksitogorsky District.

=== Renamed districts ===
- Gatchinsky District was known between 1927 and 1929 as Trotsky District, and between 1929 and 1944 as Krasnogvardeysky District.
- Kirishsky District was known before 1931 as Andreyevsky District.
- Lomonosovsky District was known before 1948 as Oraniyenbaumsky District.
- Priozersky District was known before 1948 as Keksgolmsky District.

== See also ==
- Administrative divisions of Saint Petersburg
