= Lodeynopolsky =

Lodeynopolsky (masculine), Lodeynopolskaya (feminine), or Lodeynopolskoye (neuter) may refer to:

- Lodeynopolsky District, a district of Leningrad Oblast, Russia
- Lodeynopolskoye Urban Settlement, a municipal formation corresponding to Lodeynopolskoye Settlement Municipal Formation, an administrative division of Lodeynopolsky District of Leningrad Oblast, Russia
