= Podporozhsky =

Podporozhsky (masculine), Podporozhskaya (feminine), or Podporozhskoye (neuter) may refer to:

- Podporozhsky District, a district of Leningrad Oblast, Russia
- Podporozhskoye Urban Settlement, a municipal formation corresponding to Podporozhskoye Settlement Municipal Formation, an administrative division of Podporozhsky District of Leningrad Oblast, Russia
