= Nikolsky, Leningrad Oblast =

Nikolsky Никольский
- Urban-type settlement
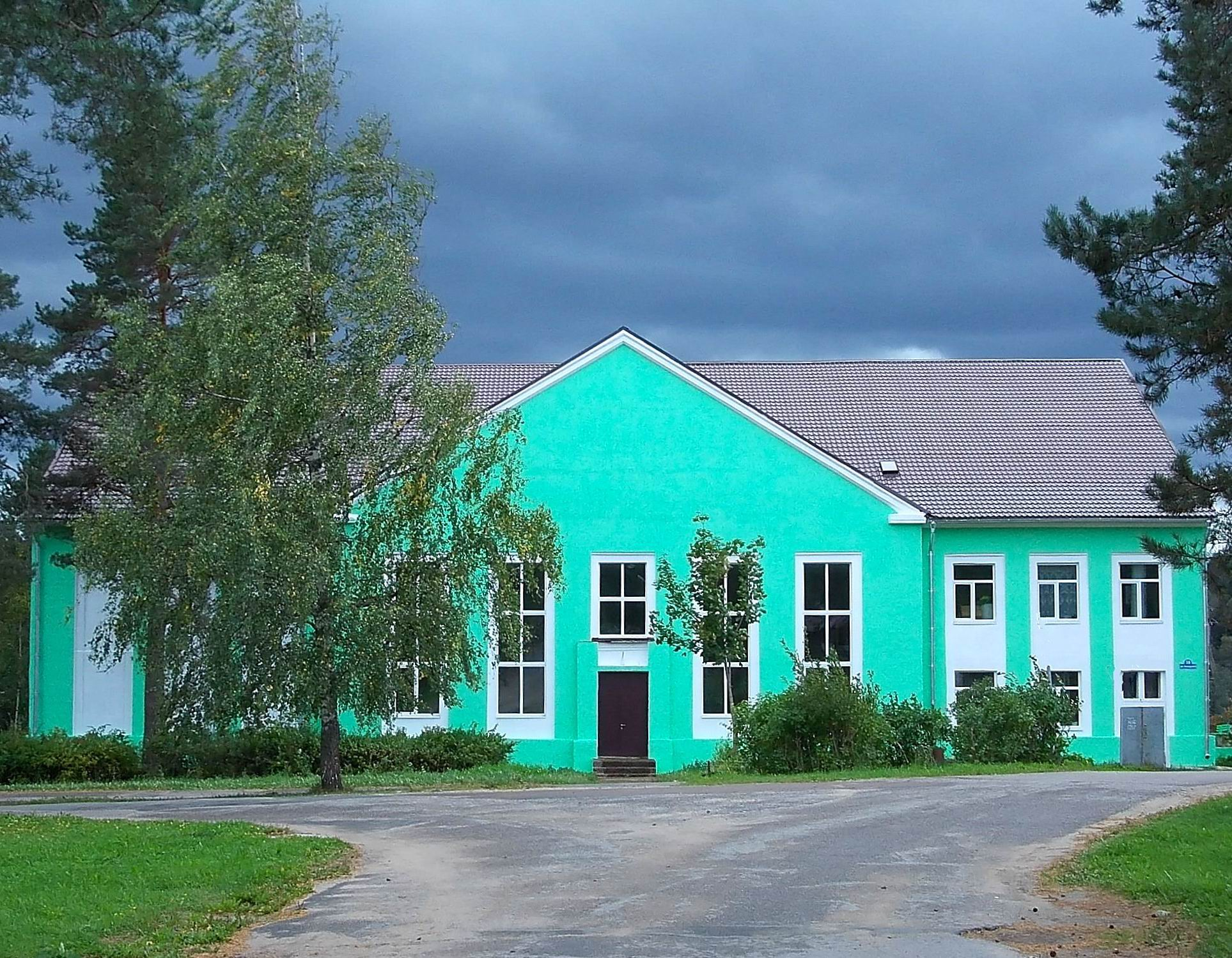

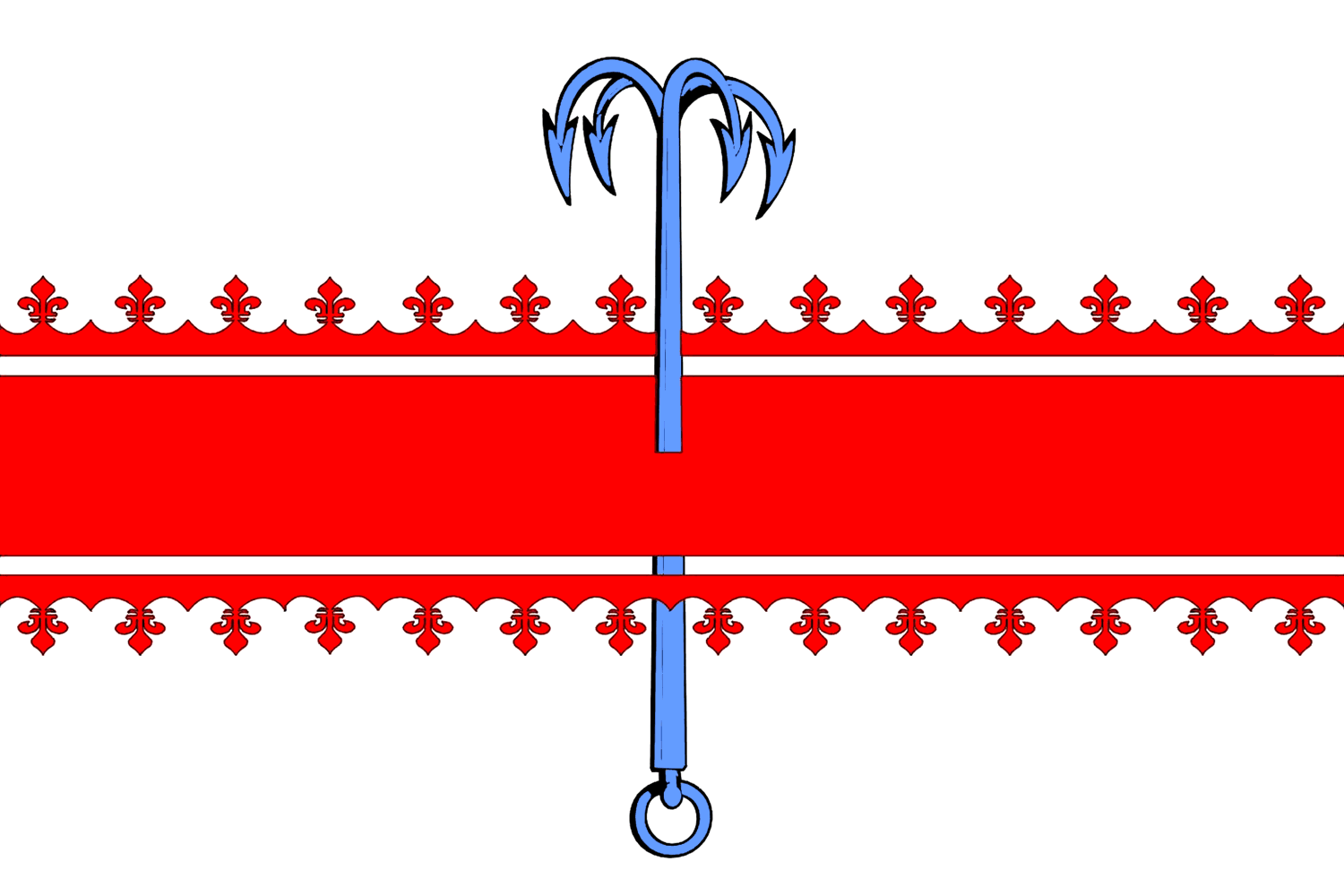
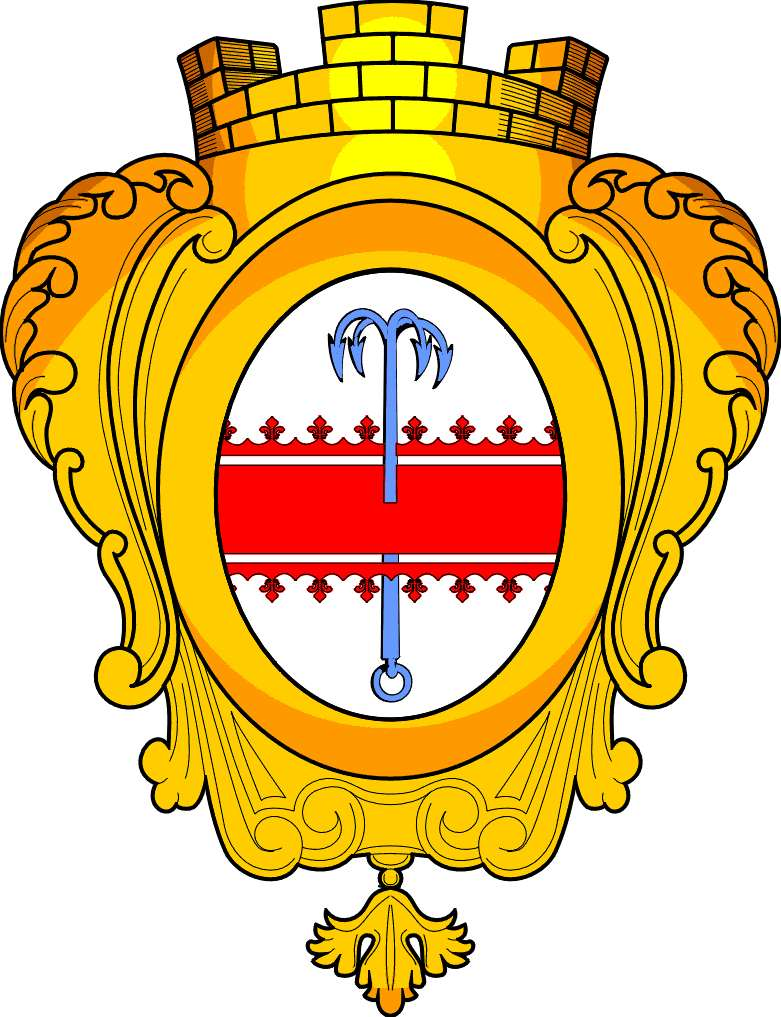
- Flag Coat of arms
- Interactive map of Nikolsky
- Location of Nikolsky Nikolsky (Leningrad Oblast)
- Coordinates: 60°55′N 34°04′E
- Country: Russia
- Federal subject: Leningrad Oblast
- Administrative district: Podporozhsky District
- Urban-type settlement status since: 1949
- Elevation: 23 m (75 ft)

Population (2010 Census)
  - Total: 2,989
  - Estimate (2024): 2,424 (−18.9%)

Municipal status
  - Municipal district: Podporozhsky Municipal District
  - Urban settlement: Nikolskoye Urban Settlement
  - Capital of: Nikolskoye Urban Settlement
- Time zone: UTC+3 (MSK)
- Postal code: 187741
- OKTMO ID: 41636163051

Nikolsky (Russian: Никольский) is an urban locality (an urban-type settlement) in Podporozhsky District of Leningrad Oblast, Russia, located on the right bank of the Svir River, several kilometers west of the town of Podporozhye. Municipally, it is incorporated as Nikolskoye Urban Settlement, one of the four urban settlements in the district. Population: 2,989 (2010 census); 2,931 (2002 census); 2,953 (1989 Soviet census).

== History ==
The Svir Shipyard was founded by Peter the Great in 1703 to saturate the demand for the growing navy. Initially, the settlement was populated by foreign workers, mainly from Germany, and the settlement was known as Nemetskoye (literal translation: Populated by Germans). In the course of the administrative reform carried out in 1708 by Peter the Great, the area was included into Ingermanland Governorate (known from 1710 as Saint Petersburg Governorate). In 1727, it was transferred to the newly established Novgorod Governorate, and in 1773, it was transferred into newly established Olonets Oblast and became a part of Lodeynopolsky Uyezd. After 1801, it was a part of Olonets Governorate. In 1913, the settlement was renamed Nikolskoye. In 1922, Olonets Governorate was abolished, and Lodeynopolsky Uyezd was transferred to Petrograd Governorate (later Leningrad Oblast).

On August 1, 1927, the uyezds in Leningrad Oblast were abolished, and Podporozhsky District with the administrative center in Podporozhye was established. It was a part of Lodeynoye Pole Okrug of Leningrad Oblast and included areas formerly belonging to Lodeynopolsky Uyezd. Nikolskoye became a part of the district. Between 1941 and 1944, during World War II, Nikolskoye was occupied by Finnish troops. In 1949, Nikolskoye was granted urban-type settlement status and renamed Nikolsky.

== Economy ==
=== Industry ===
The main enterprise in Nikolsky is the Svir Shipyard. It experiences deep economic crisis.

=== Transportation ===
The closest passenger railway station, several kilometers from the center of Nikolsky, is Svir on the railroad between Saint Petersburg and Murmansk. It is administratively subordinated to the settlement. A railroad connects Nikolsky and Svir, however, there is no passenger traffic.

Nikolsky is connected by road with Podporozhye and have an access to a paved road connecting Lodeynoye Pole with Vytegra, as well as to the road connecting Podporozhye and Olonets.

The Svir River is navigable and is a part of the Volga–Baltic Waterway, connecting the basins of the Volga and the Neva Rivers. There is regular cruise and cargo traffic along the waterway.

== Culture and recreation ==
The only recognized cultural heritage monuments (of local significance) in Nikolsky is a monument to Anna Lisitsyna, a partisan and a Hero of the Soviet Union, who drowned in the Svir River in 1942.
