= Vinnitsy =

Vinnitsy Винницы Vingl
- Village
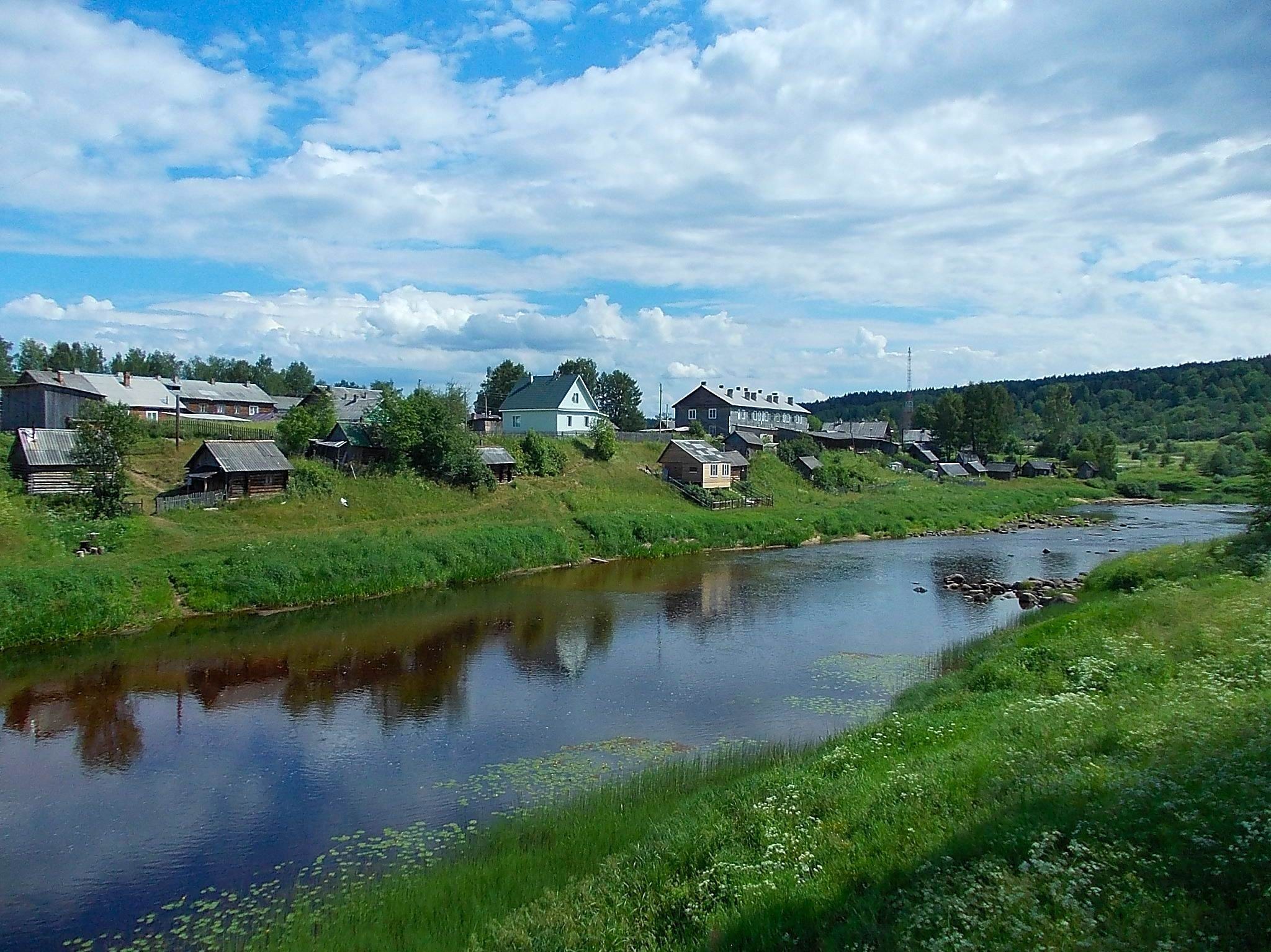
- Vinnitsy along the Oyat

- Location within Leningrad Oblast Location within Russia
- Coordinates: 60°37′42″N 34°46′25″E
- Country: Russia
- Region: Leningrad Oblast
- District: Podporozhsky District
- Rural settlement: Vinnitsy Rural Settlement

Population (2017)
  - Total: 2,059
- Time zone: UTC+3:00

Vinnitsy (Russian: Винницы, Veps: Vingl or Vidl) is a village (selo) and the municipal center of the Vinnitsy Rural Settlement in Podporozhsky District, Leningrad Oblast, Russia. As of 2017, the village had a population of 2,059.

== Geography ==
Vinnitsy is located on the upper course of the river Oyat, 74 kilometers (46 mi) southeast of the district center Podporozhye and 359 kilometers (223 mi) northeast of Saint Petersburg. It is the municipal center of the Vinnitsy rural settlement within the Podporozhsky District, covering an area of 2,929 square kilometers (1,131 sq mi). Aside from Vinnitsy itself, the municipality includes 37 other rural localities, three of which are termed posyolok and the rest are termed derevnya.

== Names and etymology ==
Vinnitsy is known in the Veps language as Vingl or Vidl, and in Russian formerly as Venitsy (Веницы). According to Vladimir Pimenov (1965), the name is derived from the Veps word venanik meaning a Russian person, since the village was for long the only one in the upper Oyat region populated by Russians instead of Veps people. Irma Mullonen instead suggests a derivation from a nickname *Vingoi, in turn from Veps vinkta 'to squeal', or from a cognate of Finnish vinka, meaning 'cold wind' (among various figurative senses).

== History ==
The pogost of Vinnitsy was first mentioned in 1137. It became the center of a volost under the Lodeynopolsky Uyezd in the 18th century, remaining so until early Soviet times. When the Leningrad Oblast was established in August 1927, Vinnitsy became the center of the Vinnitsky District, which held the status of a Veps national district from 1931 until 1938. During World War II, the district's center was temporarily relocated to the village of Ozyora further away from the frontline. The modern settlement of Vinnitsy was formed in the 20th century after a merger of multiple smaller villages along the Oyat. The Vinnitsky District was abolished in 1963 and its territory became part of the Lodeynopolsky District. Since 1965, Vinnitsy has been part of the Podporozhsky District.

== Culture ==
Vinnitsy has a library and a House of Culture, which houses a Veps ethnographic exhibition. The annual Veps cultural festival Drevo zhizni ('Tree of Life') has been held in the village since 1987. There are two wooden Orthodox churches on the site of the old pogost: Saint Barbara's Church built in the 18th century and the Church of the Nativity built in the 19th century.
