= Alexander Ryazanov (air defense designer) =

Soviet air defense designer (1932–2026)

Alexandr Ryazanov
- Александр Рязанов
- Born: 6 September 1932; Aleksandrovshchina, Lodeynopolsky District, Leningrad Oblast, Russian SFSR, USSR
- Died: 18 January 2026 (aged 93)

Alexandr Vladimirovich Ryazanov (Russian: Александр Владимирович Рязанов; 6 September 1932 – 18 January 2026) was a Soviet air defense designer. He designed the S-25, S-75, S-200, and S-300 air defense systems. He was a recipient of the USSR State Prize, and the Order of the Badge of Honour.

Ryazanov died on 18 January 2026, at the age of 93.
