= Podporozhsky District =

Podporozhsky District Подпорожский район (Russian)
- District
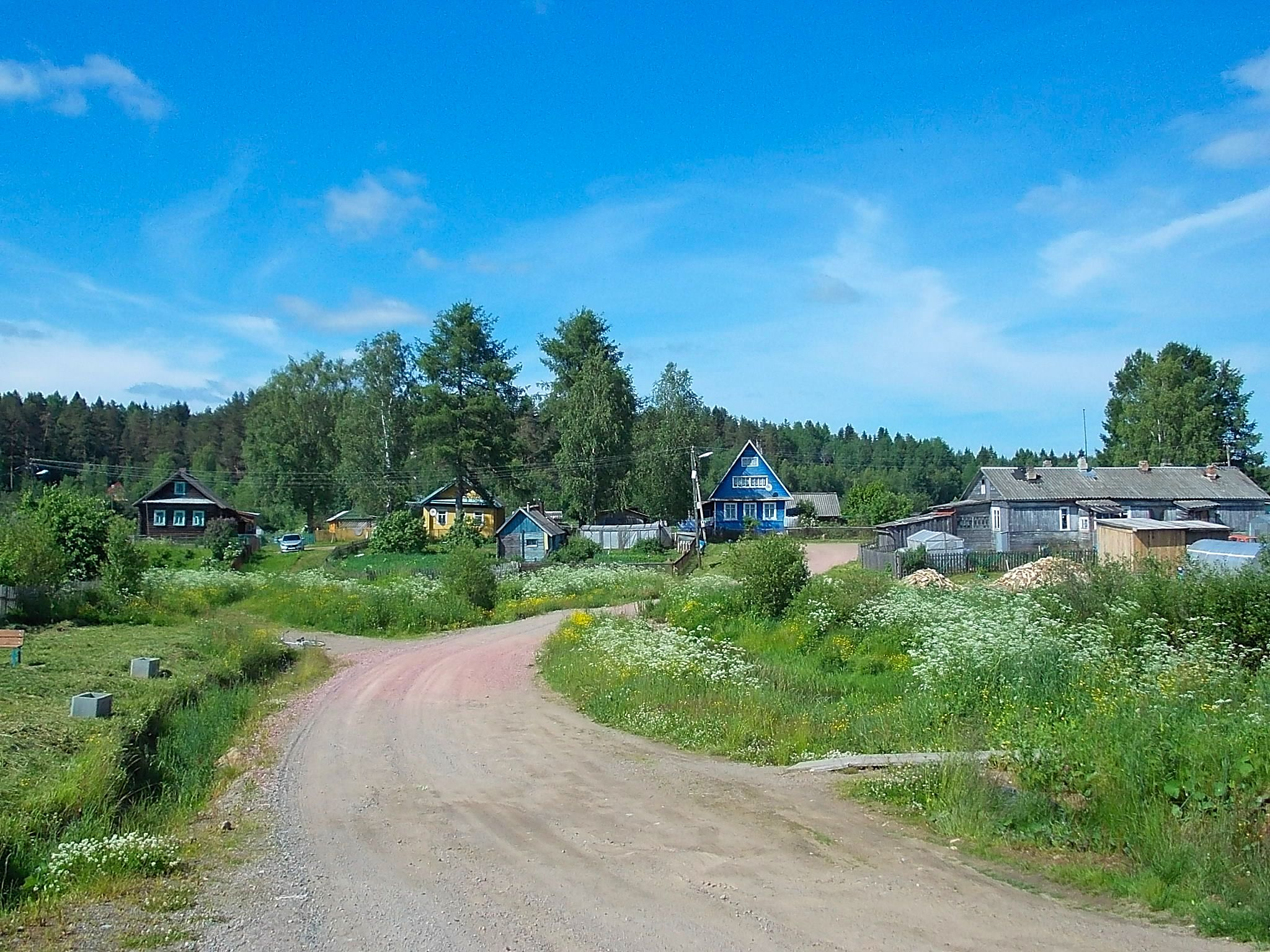
- Kupetskoye

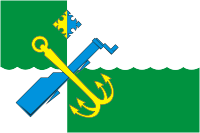
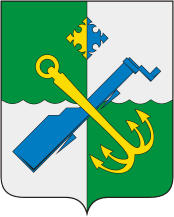
- Flag Coat of arms
- Location of Podporozhsky District in Leningrad Oblast
- Coordinates: 60°49′42″N 33°50′51″E
- Country: Russia
- Federal subject: Leningrad Oblast
- Established: 1 August 1927
- Administrative center: Podporozhye

Area
  - Total: 7,679 km^{2} (2,965 sq mi)

Population (2010 Census)
  - Total: 13,000
  - Density: 1.7/km^{2} (4.4/sq mi)
  - Urban: 62.8%
  - Rural: 37.2%

Administrative structure
  - Administrative divisions: 1 settlement municipal formation
  - Inhabited localities: 1 cities/towns, 3 urban-type settlements, 68 rural localities

Municipal structure
  - Municipally incorporated as: Podporozhsky Municipal District
  - Municipal divisions: 4 urban settlements, 1 rural settlements
- Time zone: UTC+3 (MSK)
- OKTMO ID: 41636000
- Website: www.podadm.ru

Podporozhsky District (Russian: Подпоро́жский райо́н) is an administrative and municipal district (raion), one of the seventeen in Leningrad Oblast, Russia. It is located in the northeast of the oblast and borders with Prionezhsky District of the Republic of Karelia in the north, Vytegorsky District of Vologda Oblast in the east, Babayevsky District of Vologda Oblast in the southeast, Tikhvinsky District in the south, Lodeynopolsky District in the southwest, and Olonetsky and Pryazhinsky Districts of the Republic of Karelia in the northwest. In the northeast, the district is bounded by Lake Onega. The area of the district is 7,679 square kilometers (2,965 sq mi), which makes it the largest district in Leningrad Oblast. Its administrative center is the town of Podporozhye. Population (excluding the administrative center): 13,000 (2010 census); 14,845 (2002 Census); 18,075 (1989 Soviet census).

== Geography ==
Almost the whole area of the district belongs to the drainage basin of the Svir River. The Svir, which connects Lake Onega and Lake Ladoga, has its source in the district and crosses the northern part of the district from east to west. The course of the Svir above the Upper Svir Hydroelectric Station was turned into the Ivinsky Razliv Reservoir. The biggest tributaries of the Svir within the district is the Oyat River (left), which crosses the district from east to west as well, and the Vazhinka River (right). Much of the area of the district belongs to the basin of the Oyat. Minor areas in the southeast of the district belong to the basins of the Pasha River, another major tributary of the Svir, and the Suda River, a tributary of the Rybinsk Reservoir of the Volga River basin. Thus, the divide between the basins of the Atlantic Ocean (the Svir) and the Caspian Sea (the Suda) crosses the district. The Vepsian Upland is a hilly area in the east.

== History ==
The area was populated by Balto-Finnic peoples, whose descendants, Vepsians, still live in the district. The first villages in the area, Vinnitsy and Yuksovichi, were mentioned in 1137. Until the 15th century, it was a part of the Novgorod Republic and was sparsely populated. After the fall of the republic, it was, together will all Novgorod Lands, annexed by the Grand Duchy of Moscow. In the beginning of the 18th century, Tsar Peter the Great, who recognized an important strategic location of the Svir River as a waterway connecting the two biggest lakes in European Russia, resettled peasants from the Msta River to the banks of the Svir.

In the course of the administrative reform carried out in 1708 by Peter the Great, the area was included into Ingermanland Governorate (known from 1710 as Saint Petersburg Governorate). In 1727, it was transferred to the newly established Novgorod Governorate. In 1773, the northern part of the district was transferred into newly established Olonets Oblast and split between Lodeynopolsky Uyezd (south of the Svir) and Petrozavodsky Uyezd (north of the Svir). The southern part of the current area of the district remained in Tikhvinsky Uyezd of Novgorod Governorate.

A sequence of administrative reforms followed. In 1781, Olonets Oblast was transferred to Saint Petersburg Governorate, and in 1784, it was transformed into an independent administrative unit, Olonets Viceroyalty. In 1799, Olonets Viceroyalty was abolished and divided between Novgorod and Arkhangelsk Governorates. Lodeynopolsky Uyezd was merged into Olonetsky Uyezd. In 1801, Olonets Governorate was established, and in 1802, Lodeynopolsky Uyezd was restored. The northern part of the district belonged to Lodeynopolsky Uyezd of Olonets Governorate. In 1922, Olonets Governorate was abolished, and Lodeynopolsky Uyezd was transferred to Petrograd Governorate (later Leningrad Oblast).

In June 1918, five uyezds of Novgorod Governorate, including Tikhvinsky Uyezd, were split off to form Cherepovets Governorate, with the administrative center in Cherepovets. On August 1, 1927, Cherepovets Governorate was abolished and merged into Leningrad Oblast.

On August 1, 1927, the uyezds in Leningrad Oblast were abolished, and Podporozhsky District with the administrative center in the selo of Podporozhye was established. It was a part of Lodeynoye Pole Okrug of Leningrad Oblast and included areas formerly belonging to Lodeynopolsky Uyezd. In 1932, the administrative center of the district was moved to the selo of Vazhiny. On July 5, 1937 Podporozhye was transformed into a work settlement, and on September 11 the district center was moved back to Podroporozhye. Between September 1941 and July 1944, during World War II, the northern part of the district was occupied by Finnish troops. On June 28, 1956 Podporozhye was granted town status. On February 1, 1963, during the abortive Khrushchyov administrative reform, Podporozhsky District was abolished and merged into Lodeynopolsky District. On January 11, 1965 it was re-established.

On August 1, 1927, Voznesensky District with the administrative center in the selo of Voznesenye was established as well. It was a part of Lodeynoye Pole Okrug of Leningrad Oblast and included areas formerly belonging to Lodeynopolsky Uyezd. On August 20, 1935 Voznesenye was granted work settlement status. Between September 1941 and June 1944, during World War II, the district was occupied by Finnish troops. On April 3, 1954 Voznesensky District was abolished and merged into Podporozhsky District.

Another district established on August 1, 1927 was Vinnitsky District with the administrative center in the selo of Vinnitsy was established. It was a part of Lodeynoye Pole Okrug of Leningrad Oblast and included areas formerly belonging to Lodeynopolsky and Tikhvinsky Uyezds. In February 1931, the district was transformed into a national Veps district, and between 1934 and 1936 its administrative center was in the selo of Andronovskoye. In 1939, national districts were abolished. On February 1, 1963 during the abortive Khrushchyov administrative reform Vinnitsky District was abolished and merged into Lodeynopolsky District. In 1965, it became a part of re-established Podporozhsky District.

== Demographics ==
Podporozhsky District, in particular, the Oyat drainage basin, is one of the areas traditionally populated by Vepsians.

== Economy ==
=== Industry ===
The economy of the district is based on timber industry. There are enterprises of shipbuilding (Svir Shipyars in the urban-type settlement of Nikolsky) and construction, as well as food industries.

=== Agriculture ===
The main specialization of agriculture in the district is cattle breeding with milk and meat production. Generally, in 2012 agriculture in the district was in deep depression.

=== Transportation ===
The railroad connecting Saint Petersburg and Murmansk crosses the district from north to south. The largest railway station within the district is Podporozhye.

A paved road connecting Lodeynoye Pole with Vytegra in Vologda Oblast crosses the junction from west to east, passing Podporozhye. In Oshtinsky Pogost, just behind the oblast border, another road branches north, returns to Porporozhsky District, crosses the Svir in Voznesenye by a ferry, and continues along the shore of Lake Onega to Petrozavodsk. There are also local roads going south to the valley of the Oyat, however, they do not cross to Vologda Oblast, nor they reach Tikhvin.

The Volga–Baltic Waterway, connecting the basins of the Volga and the Neva Rivers, crosses the district from east to west, bypassing Lake Onega along the Onega Canal and then following the Svir River. There is regular cruise and cargo traffic along the waterway. The passenger navigation on Lake Onega has been discontinued.

== Culture and recreation ==
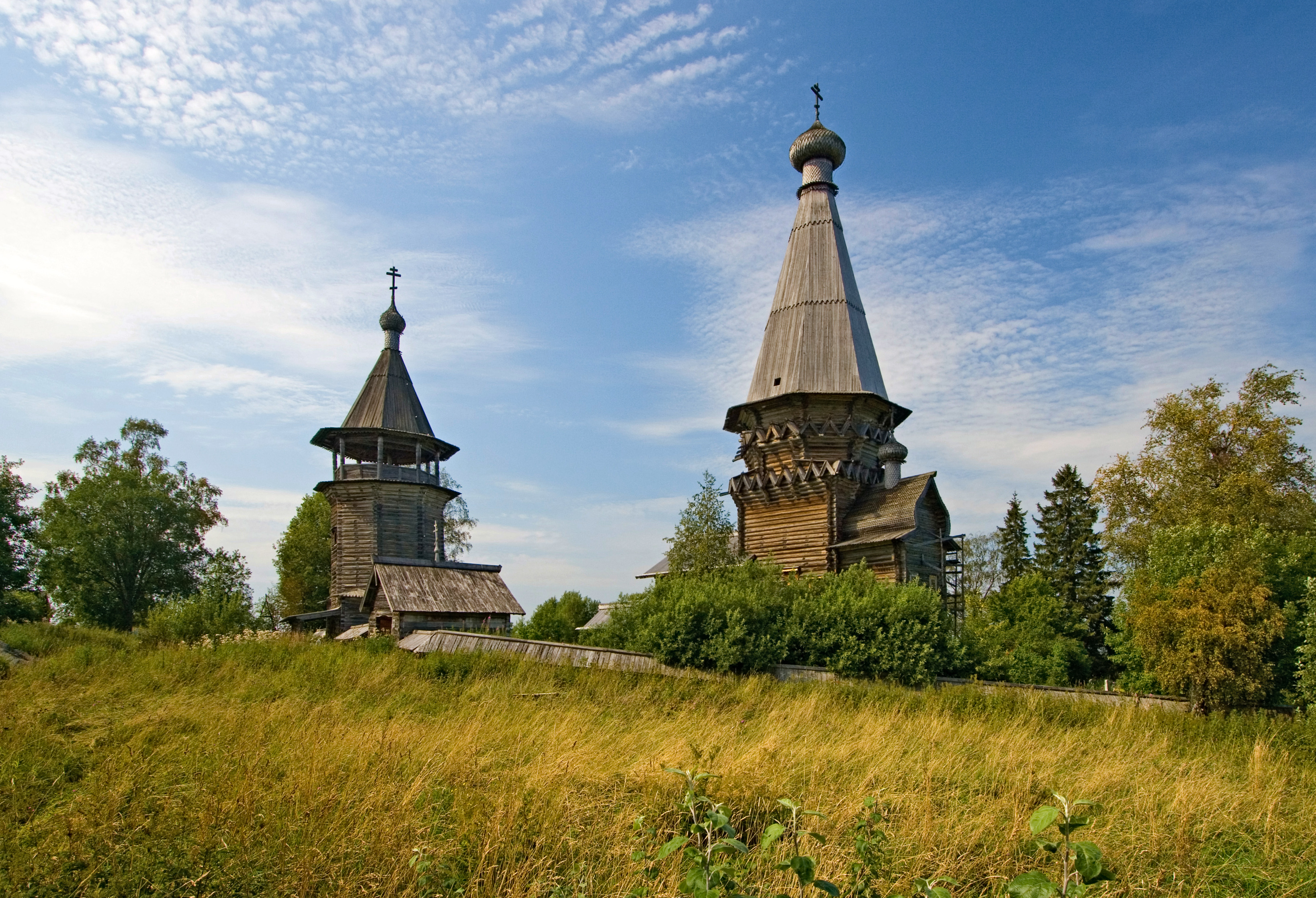
The ensemble in the village of Gimreka.

The district contains twenty-one cultural heritage monuments of federal significance and additionally forty-four objects classified as cultural and historical heritage of local significance. The majority of the monuments are old churches. Podporozhsky District contains the best samples of wooden ecclesiastical architecture in Leningrad Oblast, some of which are collectively referred to as Podporozhye Ring: The Resurrection Church in the settlement of Vazhiny, the Saint Nicholas Church in the village of Soginitsy, the Sts Peter and Paul Chapel in the village of Zaozerye, and the Saint Athanasy chapel in the village of Posad. The two other notable wooden churches are located in the villages of Gimreka and Shcheleyki close to the Onega Lake shore.

Podporozhye hosts the Podporozhye District Museum, which displays collections of local interest. In the village of Ladva, a private museum devoted to Vepsian culture was open.
