= Gimreka =

Village in Leningrad Oblast, Russia

Gimreka Гимрека
- Village
- Location in Russia Gimreka (Russia)
- Coordinates: 61°09′05″N 35°37′10″E
- Country: Russia
- Post code: 187780
- Area code: +7 81365

Gimreka (Russian: Ги́мрека) is a settlement in Podporozhsky District, Leningrad Oblast in Russia.

It is mentioned in 1496 under the pogost of Oshta as the village of na Khem-reke, the Gimoretsk patrimony (votchina) of the Antonyev Monastery.

== Gallery ==
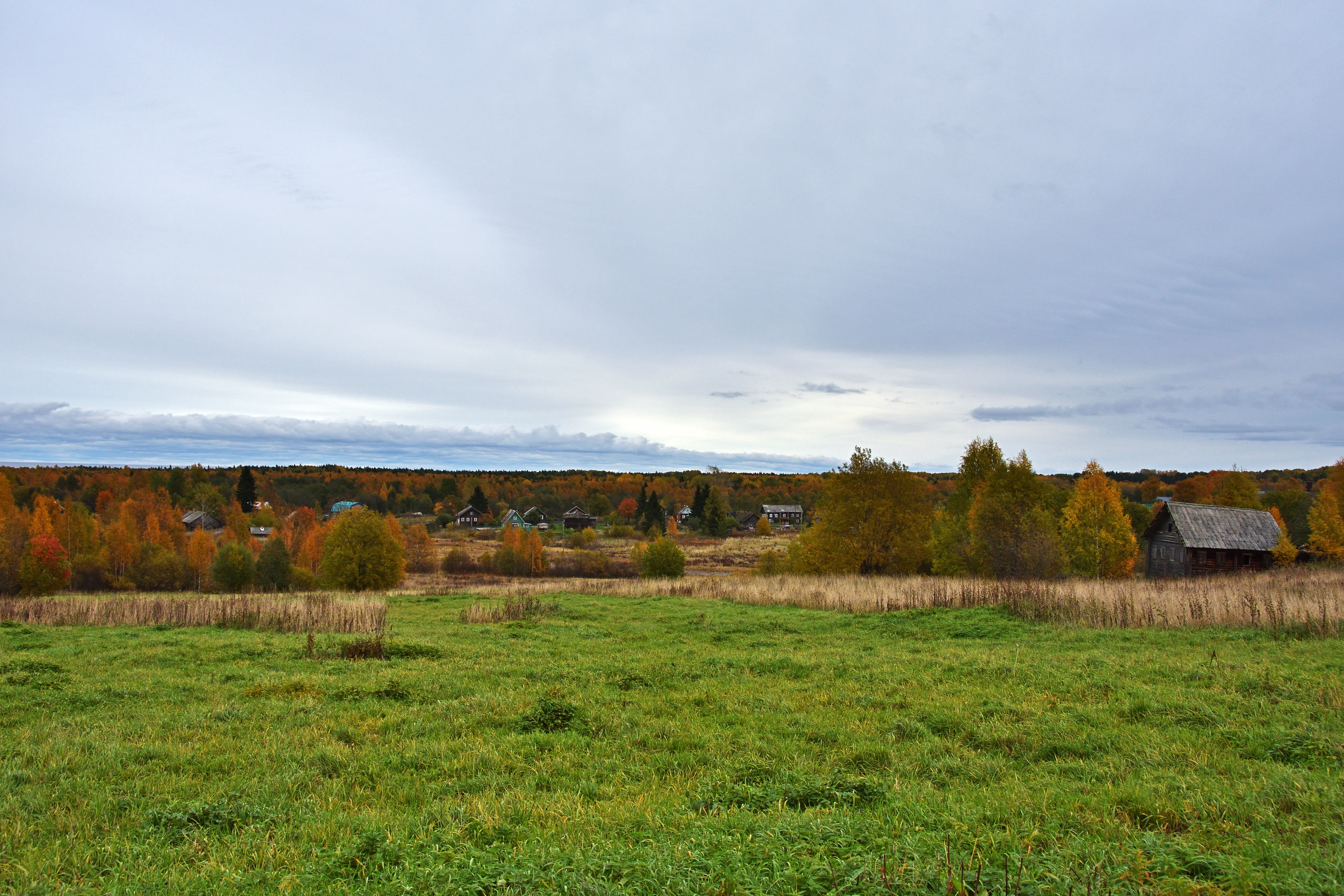
View of Gimreka

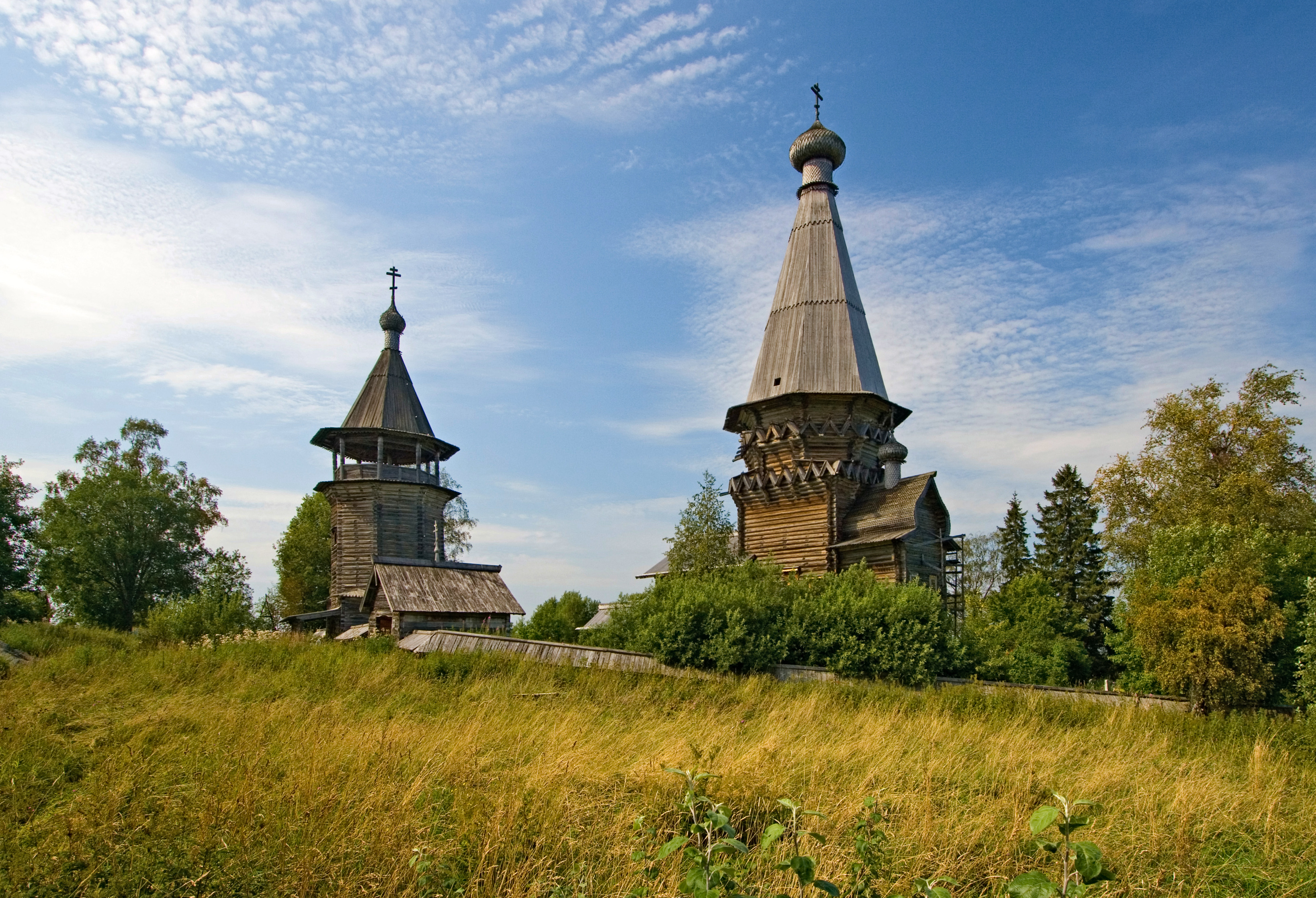
