= Svir =

River in Leningrad Oblast, Russia

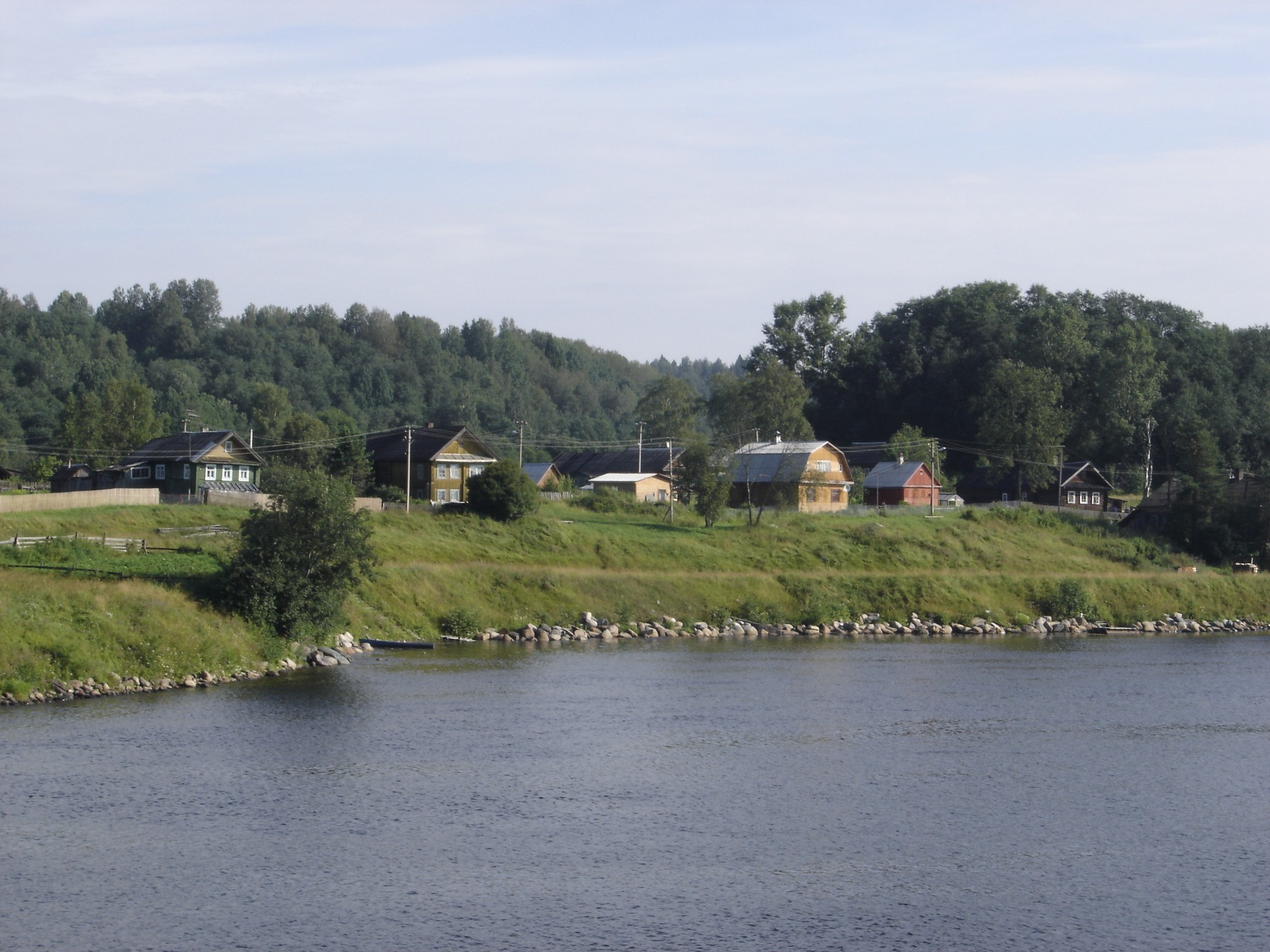
- Banks of the Svir

Location
- Country: Russia

Physical characteristics
- Source
  - location: Lake Onega
  - elevation: 32 m (105 ft)
- Mouth: Lake Ladoga
  - coordinates: 60°30′33″N 32°47′55″E
- Length: 224 km (139 mi)
- Basin size: 84,400 km^{2} (32,600 sq mi)
- Discharge
  - average: 790 m^{3}/s (28,000 cu ft/s)

Basin features
- Progression: Lake Ladoga→ Neva→ Gulf of Finland

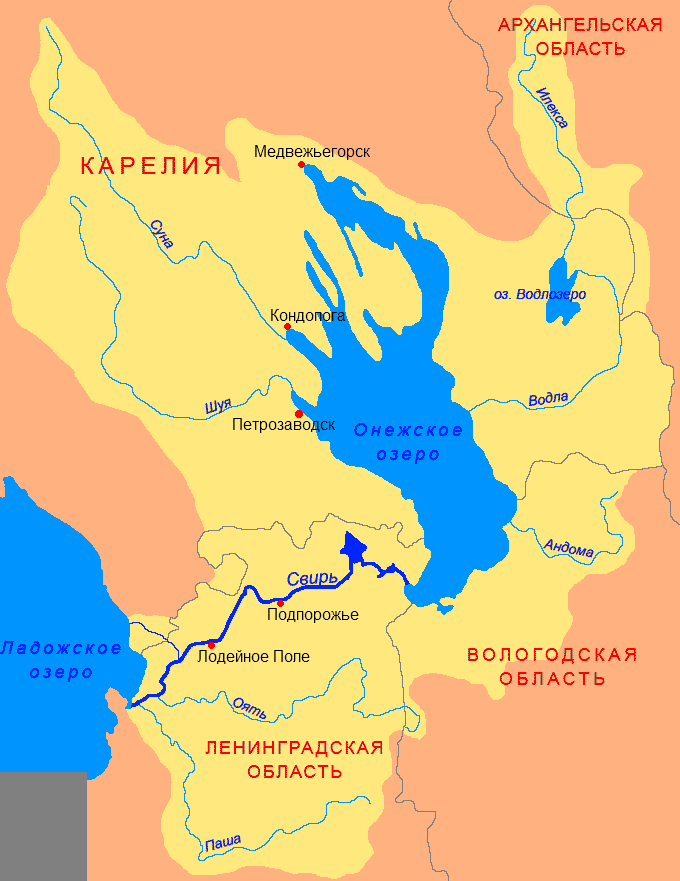
The catchment area of River Svir and its main tributaries

The Svir (Russian: Свирь; Veps: Süvär'; Karelian and Finnish: Syväri) is a river in Podporozhsky, Lodeynopolsky, and Volkhovsky districts in the north-east of Leningrad Oblast, Russia. It flows westwards from Lake Onega to Lake Ladoga, thus connecting the two largest lakes of Europe. It is the largest river flowing into Lake Ladoga. The length of the Svir is 224 kilometres (139 mi), whereas the area of its drainage basin is 84,400 square kilometres (32,600 mi^{2}). The towns of Podporozhye and Lodeynoye Pole, as well as urban-type settlements Voznesenye, Nikolsky, Vazhiny, and Svirstroy are located at the banks of the Svir.

After Peter the Great connected the Svir with the Neva by the Ladoga Canal in the 18th century, the river has been part of the Mariinsk Canal System, currently the Volga–Baltic Waterway. The Onega Canal is a bypass of Lake Onega from the south, which connects the Svir with the Vytegra. The Svir is heavily used for navigation, with both cargo traffic and cruise ships. There are two dams with hydroelectric power plants on the river. The Lower Svir Hydroelectric Station, in Svirstroy, sits 81 kilometres (50 mi) from the river's mouth while the Upper Svir Hydroelectric Station, located in Podporozhye, is 128 kilometres (80 mi) away. Above the Upper Svir Hydroelectric Station, the Svir is built as the Ivinsky Razliv Reservoir. Locks are built around both dams.

Since the Svir flows out of Lake Onega, its drainage basin occupies a vast area, spanning the south of the Republic of Karelia, the north and the east of Leningrad Oblast, the northwest of Vologda Oblast, and also includes minor areas in Arkhangelsk Oblast (the basin of the Ileksa). The main tributaries of Svir proper are the Vazhinka (right), the Oyat (left), and the Pasha (left). The main rivers in the basin of the Svir are the Suna (the longest in the Svir basin), the Shuya, the Vodla, and the Vytegra. The basin of the Svir also includes an enormous amount of freshwater lakes, the biggest of which, behind Lake Onega, are Lake Vodlozero, Lake Syamozero, Lake Gimolskoye, Lake Lizhmozero, and Lake Shotozero. The city of Petrozavodsk and the towns of Suoyarvi, Kondopoga, Medvezhyegorsk, Pudozh, Vytegra, Podporozhye, and Lodeynoye Pole, as well as a number of urban-type settlements, are located within the catchment area of the Svir.

The river flows past the Alexander-Svirsky Monastery, which housed Svirlag (one of the most infamous gulags). The area around the river saw heavy fighting during the Continuation War 1941–1944.

The right bank of the lower Svir is occupied by the Nizhnesvirsky Nature Reserve, established in 1980.
