= Lake Lizhmozero =

Lake in Karelia, Russia

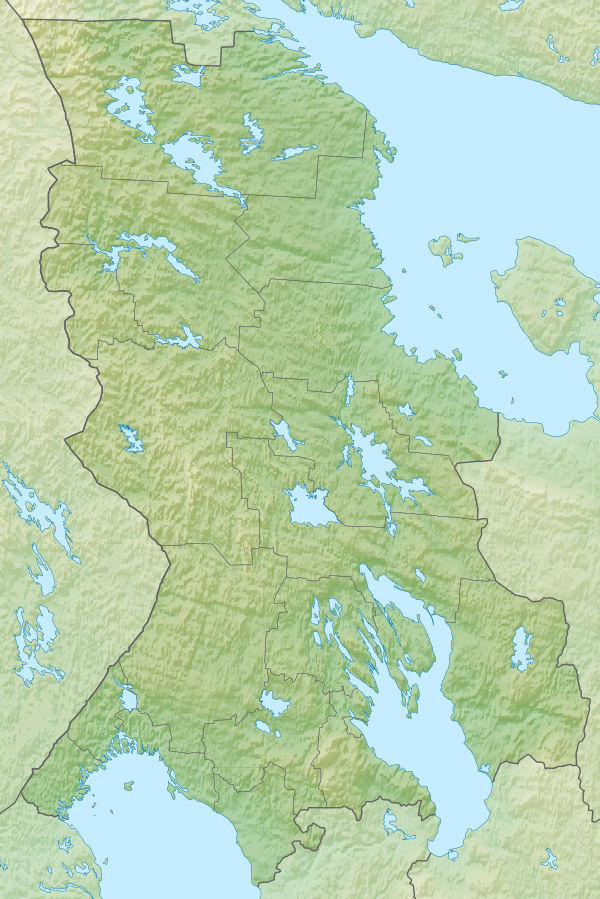
- Location within Karelia
- Location: Republic of Karelia
- Coordinates: 64°38′24″N 34°3′36″E
- Basin countries: Russia
- Max. length: 18.6 km (11.6 mi)
- Max. width: 7.3 km (4.5 mi)
- Surface area: 84.8 km^{2} (32.7 sq mi)
- Average depth: 5.4 m (18 ft)
- Max. depth: 22 m (72 ft)

Lake Lizhmozero is a lake located in Kondopozhsky District, Republic of Karelia, Russia. It covers an area of 84.8 square kilometers, a length of 18.6 kilometers and a maximum width of 7.3 kilometers. The average depth of the lake is 5.4 and the maximum depth is 22 meters.
