= Oyat =

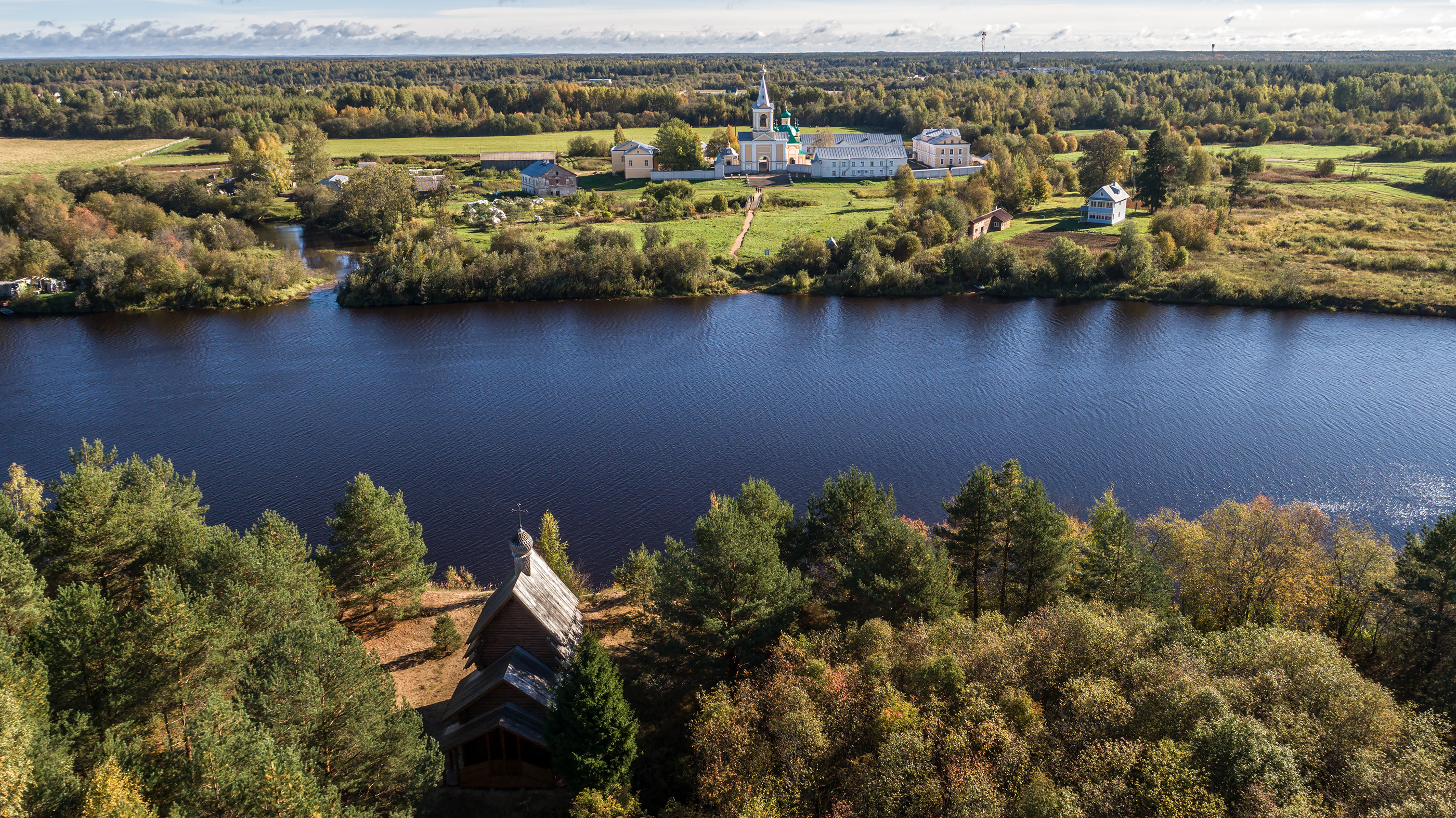

Location
- Country: Russia

Physical characteristics
- Source
  - location: Lake Chaymozero
  - elevation: 226 m (741 ft)
- Mouth: Svir
  - coordinates: 60°30′19″N 33°01′38″E
- Length: 266 km (165 mi)
- Basin size: 5,220 km^{2} (2,020 sq mi)
- Discharge
  - average: 55 m^{3}/s (1,900 cu ft/s)

Basin features
- Progression: Svir→ Lake Ladoga→ Neva→ Gulf of Finland

The Oyat (Russian: Оять) is a river in Babayevsky District of Vologda Oblast and Podporozhsky and Lodeynopolsky Districts of Leningrad Oblast of Russia, a major left tributary of the Svir (Lake Ladoga basin). The length of the Oyat is 266 kilometres (165 mi), and the area of its drainage basin is 5,220 square kilometres (2,020 mi^{2}).

The source of the Oyat is Lake Chaymozero in the western part of Babayevsky District. The Oyat flows to the northwest and enters Leningrad Oblast. In the village of Shandovichi it turns north. Upstream of the selo of Vinnitsy the Oyat accepts the Tuksha from the right and sharply turns southwest. It enters Lodeynopolsky District and in the selo of Alekhovshchina turns northwest. The mouth of the Oyat is located in the selo of Domozhilovo. Much of the valley of the Oyat in Leningrad oblast is populated.

The drainage basin of the Oyat includes the southern parta of Podporozhsky and Lodeynopolsky Districts, the areas in the west of Vytegorsky and Babayevsky Districts of Vologda Oblast, as well as minor areas in the north of Tikhvinsky District of Leningrad Oblast. There are many lakes in the basin of the Oyat, the biggest of them being Lake Savozero.

== History ==
Since the beginning of the first millennium, the region was inhabited by the Finno-Ugric population. Archaeological excavations of burials of the 10th century show the complete predominance of the traditions of the Baltic-Finnish population of the Oyat and Malaya Oyat rivers. Special features of the tradition include wrapping the burnt bones and the deceased in birch bark and sprinkling calcined bones on top.

Oyat is also an area of ancient Slavic settlements. Tervensky Pogost (Tervenichy) was mentioned already in the chronicles of 1137.

== See also ==
- List of rivers of Russia
- Vepsian Upland
