= Lodeynopolsky District =

Lodeynopolsky District Лодейнопольский район (Russian)
- District
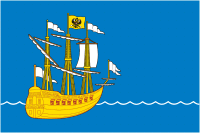
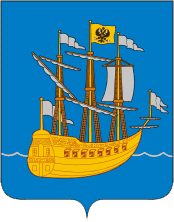
- Flag Coat of arms
- Location of Lodeynopolsky District in Leningrad Oblast
- Coordinates: 60°43′N 30°33′E
- Country: Russia
- Federal subject: Leningrad Oblast
- Established: 1 August 1927
- Administrative center: Lodeynoye Pole

Area
  - Total: 4,900 km^{2} (1,900 sq mi)

Population (2010 Census)
  - Total: 9,795
  - Density: 2.0/km^{2} (5.2/sq mi)
  - Urban: 9.5%
  - Rural: 90.5%

Administrative structure
  - Administrative divisions: 3 settlement municipal formation
  - Inhabited localities: 1 cities/towns, 1 urban-type settlements, 121 rural localities

Municipal structure
  - Municipally incorporated as: Lodeynopolsky Municipal District
  - Municipal divisions: 2 urban settlements, 3 rural settlements
- Time zone: UTC+3 (MSK)
- OKTMO ID: 41627000
- Website: http://www.admlodia.ru/

Lodeynopolsky District (Russian: Лодейнопо́льский райо́н) is an administrative and municipal district (raion), one of the seventeen in Leningrad Oblast, Russia. It is located in the northeast of the oblast and borders with Olonetsky District of the Republic of Karelia in the north, Podporozhsky District in the east, Tikhvinsky District in the south, and Volkhovsky District in the west. The area of the district is 4,900 square kilometers (1,900 sq mi). Its administrative center is the town of Lodeynoye Pole. Population (excluding the administrative center): 9,795 (2010 census); 12,185 (2002 Census); 13,426 (1989 Soviet census).

== Geography ==
The district is adjacent to Lake Ladoga, the largest freshwater lake in Europe, and the whole area of the district belongs to the catchment area of Lake Ladoge. The most important river in the district is the Svir, which connects Lake Onega and Lake Ladoga. The Svir is dammed by the Lower Svir Hydroelectric Station. The biggest tributary of the Svir within the district is the Oyat (right). The central part of the district belongs to the river basin of the Oyat, whereas some areas in the southern part of the district belong to the basin of the Kapsha, a tributary of the Pasha, another major tributary of the Oyat. The largest lake in the district (behind Lake Ladoga) is Lake Savozero, in the basin of the Oyat. Almost the whole area of the district is covered by forests.

The northwestern part of the district, limited by the Svir in the south, by Lake Ladoga in the west, and by the Republic of Karelia in the north, is allocated to Nizhnesvirsky Nature Reserve, a protected natural area.

== History ==
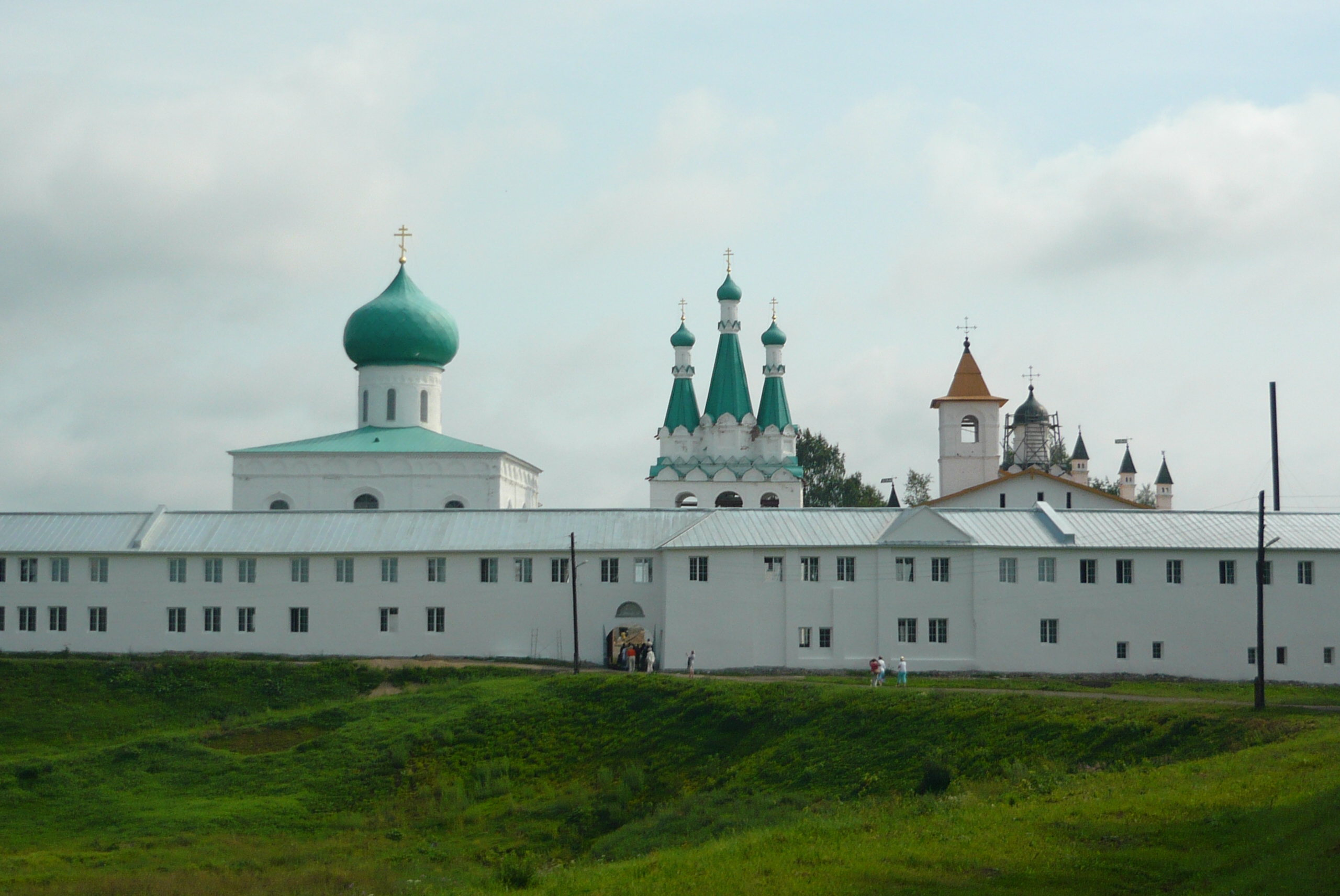
Panorama of the Alexander-Svirsky Monastery

The area was populated by Balto-Finnic peoples, and later, since it was on one of the main waterways connecting Novgorod with the Russian North, it became a part of the Novgorod Republic. In 1478, Alexander Svirsky, a monk formerly at the Valaam Monastery, founded Alexander-Svirsky Monastery not far from the mouth of the Svir. In the 15th century, the area, as a part of Novgorod, was annexed by the Grand Duchy of Moscow.

In 1702, Tsar Peter the Great founded the Olonets Shipyard on the Svir River and resettled peasants along the banks of the Svir. The settlement at the shipyard became known as Lodeynoye Pole. In the course of the administrative reform carried out in 1708 by Peter the Great, the area was included into Ingermanland Governorate (known from 1710 as Saint Petersburg Governorate). In 1727, it was transferred to the newly established Novgorod Governorate. In 1773, the northern part of the current area of the district was transferred into newly established Olonets Oblast and included into Lodeynopolsky Uyezd. The southern part of the current area of the district remained in Tikhvinsky Uyezd of Novgorod Governorate.

A sequence of administrative reforms followed. In 1781, Olonets Oblast was transferred to Saint Petersburg Governorate, and in 1784, it was transformed into an independent administrative unit, Olonets Viceroyalty. In 1785, Lodeynoye Pole was granted town status. In 1799, Olonets Viceroyalty was abolished and divided between Novgorod and Arkhangelsk Governorates. Lodeynopolsky Uyezd was merged into Olonetsky Uyezd. In 1801, Olonets Governorate was established, and in 1802, Lodeynopolsky Uyezd was restored. The northern part of the district belonged to Lodeynopolsky Uyezd of Olonets Governorate. In 1922, Olonets Governorate was abolished, and Lodeynopolsky Uyezd was transferred to Petrograd Governorate (later Leningrad Oblast).

In June 1918, five uyezds of Novgorod Governorate, including Tikhvinsky Uyezd, were split off to form Cherepovets Governorate, with the administrative center in Cherepovets. On August 1, 1927, Cherepovets Governorate was abolished and merged into Leningrad Oblast.

On August 1, 1927, the uyezds in Leningrad Oblast were abolished, and Lodeynopolsky District with the administrative center in the town of Lodeynoye Pole was established. It was a part of Lodeynoye Pole Okrug of Leningrad Oblast and included areas formerly belonging to Lodeynopolsky Uyezd. In the 1927, a large-scale construction of the Lower Svir Hydroelectric Station started, predominantly by using prisoners. For this purpose, in 1931 the concentration camp Svirlag was established, with the headquarters in the settlement of Svirstroy. In 1931, Svirstroy was granted urban-type settlement status. Between September 1941 and June 1944, during World War II, the northern part of the district was occupied by Finnish troops. Due to the damage cause by the war two of the selsoviets (Kanomsky and Mandrogsky Selsoviets) were abolished in 1950.

On August 1, 1927, Shapshinsky District District with the administrative center in the village of Gonginichi was established as well. It was a part of Lodeynoye Pole Okrug of Leningrad Oblast and included areas formerly belonging to Lodeynopolsky and Tikhvinsky Uyezds. On November 14, of the same year, the district was renamed Oyatsky, and its administrative center was transferred to the village of Alyokhovshchina. On December 14, 1955 Oyatsky District was abolished and merged into Lodeynopolsky District.

== Economy ==
=== Industry ===
The economy of the district is based on timber industry. There are also food industry enterprises.

=== Agriculture ===
The agriculture of Lodeynopolsky District specializes in cattle breeding with milk and meat production. There is also trout farming.

=== Transportation ===
The railroad connecting Saint Petersburg and Murmansk crosses the district from southwest to northeast. The largest railway station within the district is Lodeynoye Pole.

The M18 highway, connecting Saint Petersburg and Murmansk, crosses the district as well. In Lodeynoye Pole, it turns north and enters the Republic of Karelia. A paved road branches off east in Lodeynoye Pole and continues to Vytegra in Vologda Oblast via Podporozhye. There are also local roads.

The Volga–Baltic Waterway, connecting the basins of the Volga and the Neva Rivers, crosses the district from east to west, following the Svir River. There is regular cruise and cargo traffic along the waterway.

== Culture and recreation ==
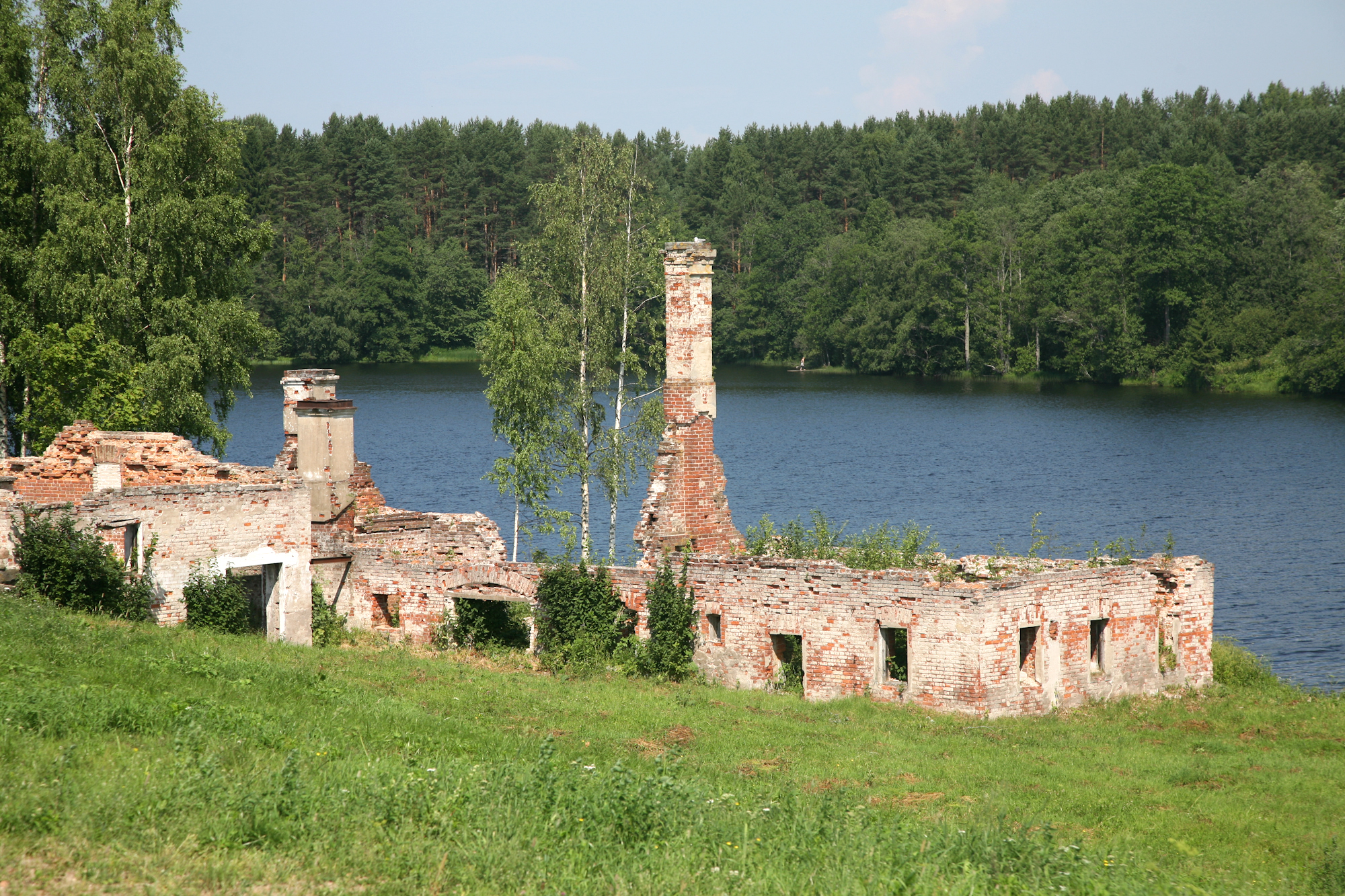
Ruins of the kvas brewery and of the pump-house previously belonging to the Alexander-Svirsky Monastery, on the background of Lake Roshchinskoye

The district contains forty-two cultural heritage monuments of federal significance and additionally forty-two objects classified as cultural and historical heritage of local significance. The federal monuments include the buildings of the Alexander-Svirsky Monastery, founded in 1487 century and located in the village of Staraya Sloboda.

The Lodeynoye Pole District Museum, located in the town of Lodeynoye Pole, is the only state museum in the district.
