= Lodeynopolsky Uyezd =

Lodeynopolsky Uyezd (Russian: Лодейнопольский уезд) was one of the seven subdivisions of the Olonets Governorate of the Russian Empire. Its capital was Lodeynoye Pole. Lodeynopolsky Uyezd was located in the southern part of the governorate (in the northeastern part of the present-day Leningrad Oblast and the northwestern part of Vologda Oblast). In terms of present-day administrative borders, the territory of Lodeynopolsky Uyezd is divided between the Lodeynopolsky and Podporozhsky districts of Leningrad Oblast and Vytegorsky District of Vologda Oblast.

== Demographics ==
At the time of the Russian Empire Census of 1897, Lodeynopolsky Uyezd had a population of 46,255. Of these, 79.8% spoke Russian, 19.2% Veps, 0.5% Finnish, 0.2% Karelian and 0.1% Polish as their native language.
