= Olonets Governorate =

1801–1922 unit of Russia

Coordinates: 61.7833°N 34.3500°E

Olonets Governorate Олонецкая губерния
- Governorate of the Russian Empire and Russian SFSR
- 1801–1922
- Coat of arms

- Olonets Governorate within the Russian Empire
- Capital: Petrozavodsk
- Area
  - (1897): 2,701.65 km^{2} (1,043.11 sq mi)
- Population
  - (1897): 364,156
- History
  - Established: 21 September 1801
  - Disestablished: 18 September 1922
- Political subdivisions: uezds: 7 (1922), 4
Preceded by	Succeeded by
Novgorod Governorate; Arkhangel Governorate	Karelian Autonomous Soviet Socialist Republic

Olonets Governorate (Note: Russian: Олонецкая губерния, pre-1918: Олонецкая губернія, romanized: Olonetskaya guberniya; Finnish: Aunuksen kuvernementti) was an administrative-territorial unit (guberniya) of the Russian Empire, extending from Lake Ladoga almost to the White Sea, bounded west by Finland, north and east by Arkhangelsk and Vologda, and south by Novgorod and Saint Petersburg. The area was 57,422 km^{2}, of which 6,794 km^{2} were covered by lakes.

== Geology ==
Its north-western portion belonged orographically and geologically to the Finland region; it is thickly dotted with hills reaching 1,000 ft. in altitude, and diversified by numberless smaller ridges and hollows running from northwest to south-east. The rest of the governorate was a flat plateau sloping towards the marshy lowlands of the south. The geological structure was very varied. Granites, syenites, and diorites, covered with Laurentian metamorphic slates, occurred extensively in the north-west. Near Lake Onega they were overlain with Devonian sandstones and limestones, yielding marble and sandstone for building; to the south of that lake carboniferous limestones and clays made their appearance. The whole was sheeted with boulder-clay, the bottom moraine of the great ice-sheet of the last glacial period. The entire region bears traces of glaciation, either in the shape of scratchings and elongated grooves on the rocks, or of eskers (asar, selgas) running parallel to the glacial striations.

== Hydrology ==
Many lakes occupied the depressions, while a great many more had left evidences of their existence in the extensive marshes. Lake Onega covers 3,764 m^{2}, and reaches a depth of 400 ft (120 m). Lakes Zeg, Vygozero, Lacha, Loksha, Tulos, and Vodlozero cover from 140 to 480 m^{2} each, and their crustacean fauna indicates a former connection with the Arctic Ocean. The south-eastern part of Lake Ladoga falls also within the government of Olonets. The rivers drain to the Baltic Sea and White Sea basins. To the former system belong Lakes Ladoga and Onega, which are connected by the Svir River and receive numerous streams; of these the Vytegra, which communicates with the Mariinsk canal-system, and the Oyat, an affluent of Lake Ladoga, are important for navigation.

== Climate and fauna ==
Large quantities of timber, firewood, stone, metal and flour were annually shipped on waters belonging to this governorate. The Onega River, which has its source in the south-east of the governorate and flows into the White Sea, is of minor importance.

Sixty-three percent of the area of Olonets was occupied by forests; those of the Crown, maintained for shipbuilding purposes, extended to more than 800,000 acres (3,000 km^{2}).

The climate is harsh and moist, the average yearly temperature at Petrozavodsk (61 8' N.) being 33.6 °F (1 °C). 12.0 °F (−11 °C) in January, 57.4 °F (14 °C) in July; but the thermometer rarely falls below −30 °F (−34 °C).

== Population ==
The population, which numbered 321,250 in 1881, reached 367,902 in 1897, and 401,100 (estimate) in 1906. They were principally Russians, Karelians, Vepsians and Finns. At the time of the Russian Empire Census of 1897, 78.2% spoke Russian, 16.3% Karelian, 4.4% Veps, 0.7% Finnish, 0.1% Yiddish and 0.1% Polish as their first language. 98.3% were Russian Orthodox (including Edinovertsy), 0.8% Old Believers, 0.7% Lutheran, 0.1% Jewish and 0.1% Roman Catholic.

== Industries ==
Rye and oats were the principal crops, and some flax, barley, and turnips were grown, but the total cultivated area did not exceed 2 1/2% of the whole governorate. The chief source of wealth was timber, next to which come fishing and hunting. Mushrooms and berries were exported to St. Petersburg. There were quarries and iron-mines, saw-mills, tanneries, iron-works, distilleries, and flour-mills. More than one-fifth of the entire male population left their homes every year in search of temporary employment.

== Administration division ==
Olonets Governorate was divided into seven uyezds, of which the chief towns were Petrozavodsk, Kargopol, Lodeynoye Pole, Olonets, Povenets, Pudozh, and Vytegra. It included the Olonets mining district, a territory belonging to the Crown, which covered 432 m^{2} and extended into the Serdobol district of Finland; the ironworks were begun by Peter the Great in 1701–1714.

== History ==
Olonets was colonized by Novgorod in the 11th century, and though it suffered much from Swedish invasion its towns soon became wealthy trading centres. Ivan III of Russia annexed it to Muscovy in the second half of the 15th century.

== See also ==
- Olonetsky District of modern Russia
