= Podporozhye, Leningrad Oblast =

Town in Leningrad Oblast, Russia

Podporozhye Подпорожье
- Town
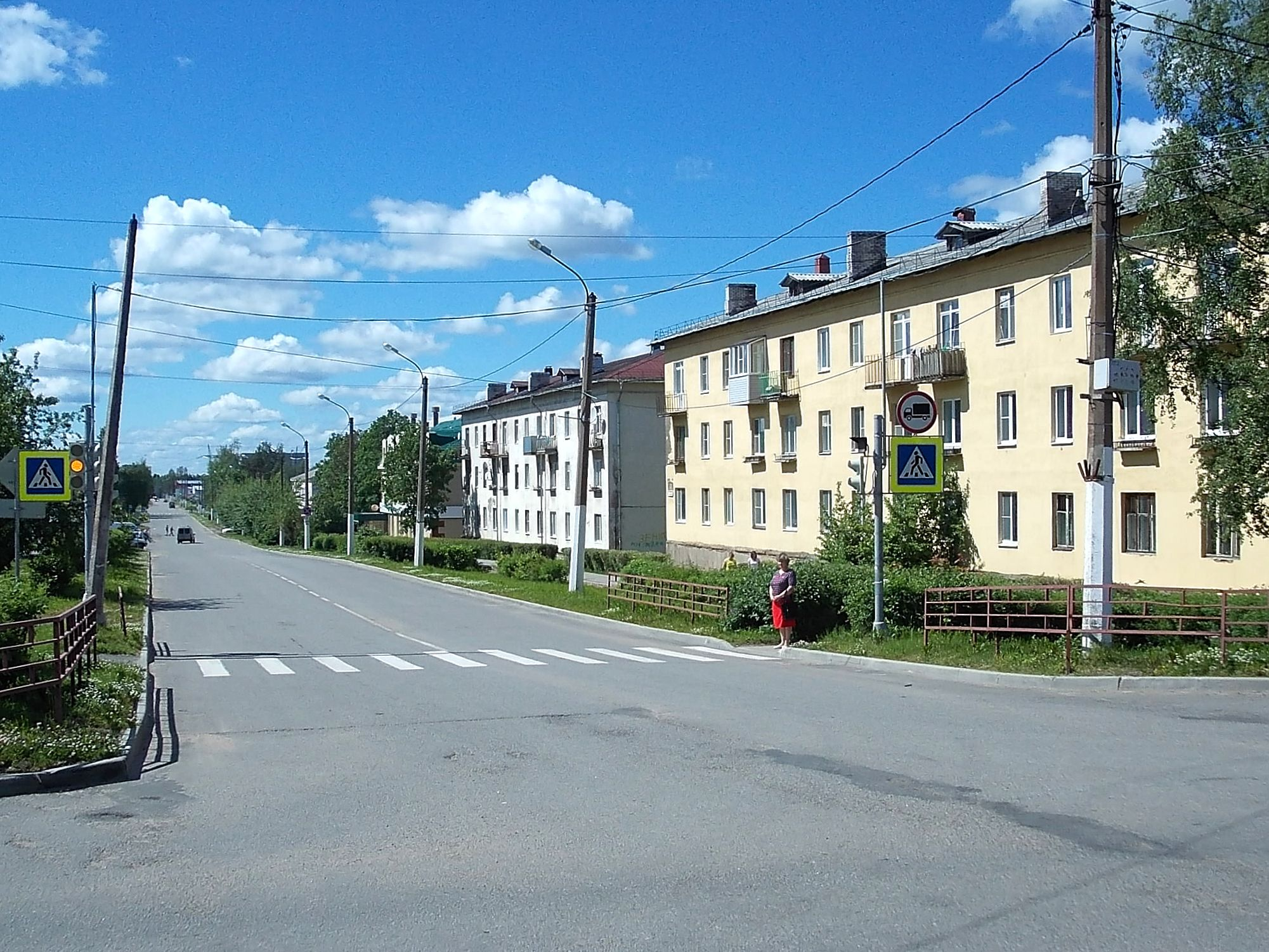

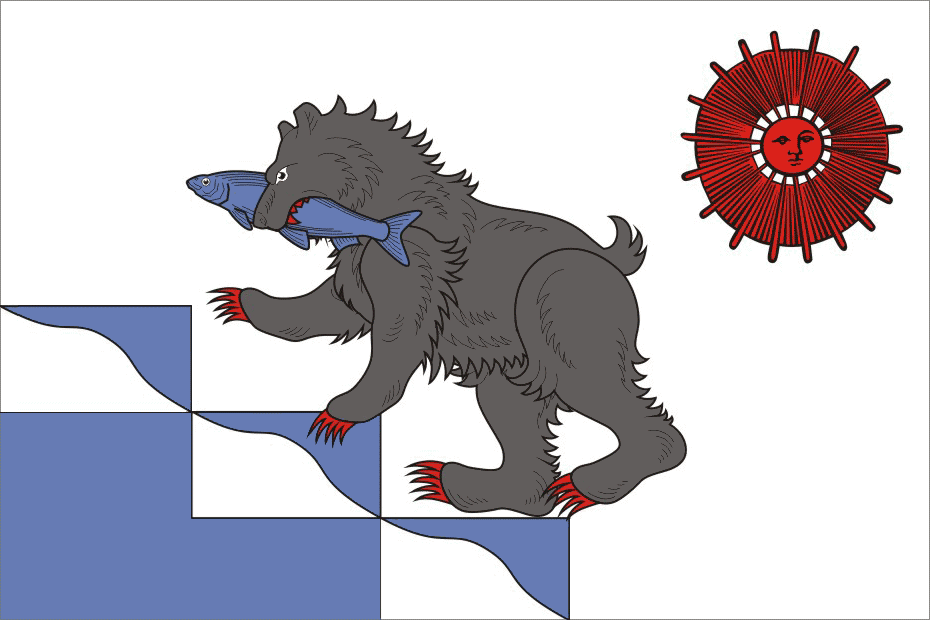
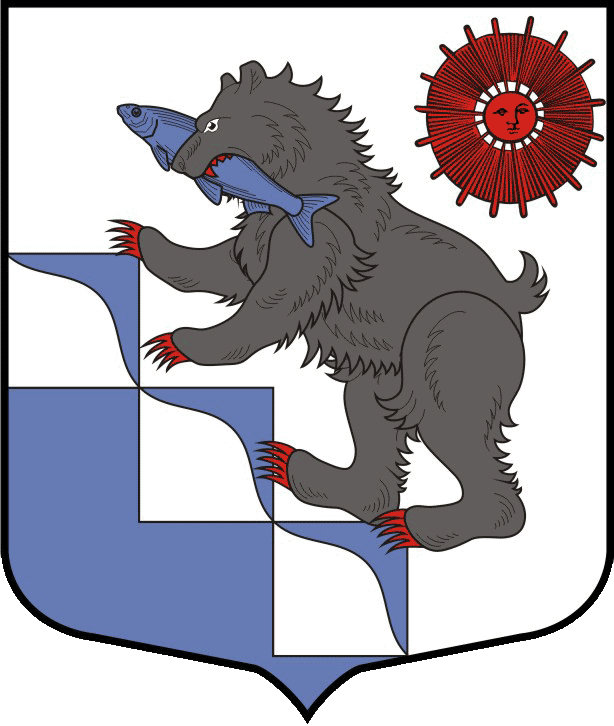
- Flag Coat of arms
- Interactive map of Podporozhye
- Location of Podporozhye Podporozhye (Leningrad Oblast)
- Coordinates: 60°54′N 34°12′E
- Country: Russia
- Federal subject: Leningrad Oblast
- Administrative district: Podporozhsky District
- Settlement municipal formationSelsoviet: Podporozhskoye Settlement Municipal Formation
- Founded: 1936
- Town status since: June 28, 1956
- Elevation: 50 m (160 ft)

Population (2010 Census)
  - Total: 18,733
  - Estimate (2024): 15,512 (−17.2%)

Administrative status
  - Capital of: Podporozhsky District, Podporozhskoye Settlement Municipal Formation

Municipal status
  - Municipal district: Podporozhsky Municipal District
  - Urban settlement: Podporozhskoye Urban Settlement
  - Capital of: Podporozhsky Municipal District, Podporozhskoye Urban Settlement
- Time zone: UTC+3 (MSK)
- Postal codes: 187780-187783, 187789, 187799
- OKTMO ID: 41636101001

Podporozhye (Russian: Подпоро́жье; Veps: Kos’kenaluine) is a town and the administrative center of Podporozhsky District in Leningrad Oblast, Russia, located on the Svir River 285 kilometers (177 mi) northeast of St. Petersburg. Population: 18,733 (2010 census); 20,312 (2002 census); 23,295 (1989 Soviet census).

== History ==
In the early 18th century, Peter the Great ordered the resettlement of peasants from the Msta River to the current location of Podporozhye to organize navigation along the Svir River, known for its nearly impassable rapids. In the late 19th century, these minor settlements next to the Svir rapids (Sigovets and Medvedets) received the name of Podporozhye (literally, "under the rapids"). By the beginning of the 20th century, Podporozhye was a village and a part of Lodeynopolsky Uyezd in Olonets Governorate. In 1922, Olonets Governorate was abolished and Lodeynopolsky Uyezd was transferred to Petrograd Governorate (later Leningrad Oblast).

On August 1, 1927, the uyezds in Leningrad Oblast were abolished and Podporozhsky District with the administrative center in Podporozhye was established. It was a part of Lodeynoye Pole Okrug of Leningrad Oblast. In 1932, the administrative center of the district was moved to the selo of Vazhiny. In 1936, the construction of the Upper Svir Hydroelectric Station, launched in 1952, began. On July 5, 1937, Podporozhye was transformed into a work settlement and on September 11, 1937, the district's administrative center was moved back to Podroporozhye. Between 1941 and 1944, during World War II, Podporozhye was occupied by Finnish troops. On June 28, 1956, Podporozhye was granted town status.

== Administrative and municipal status ==
Within the framework of administrative divisions, Podporozhye serves as the administrative center of Podporozhsky District. As an administrative division, it is, together with thirteen rural localities, incorporated within Podporozhsky District as Podporozhskoye Settlement Municipal Formation. As a municipal division, Podporozhskoye Settlement Municipal Formation is incorporated within Podporozhsky Municipal District as Podporozhskoye Urban Settlement.

== Economy ==
=== Industry ===
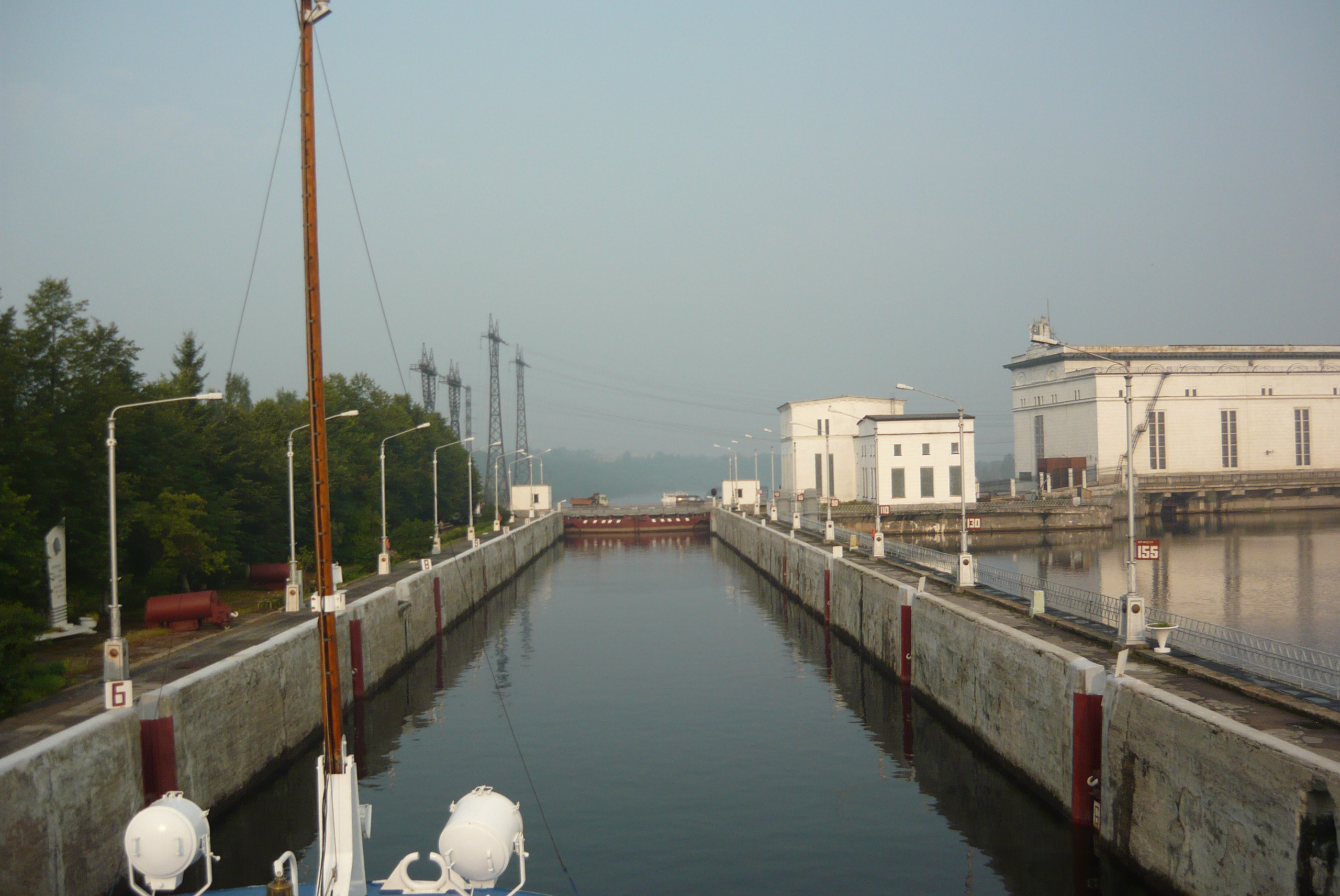
A lock of the Upper Svir Hydroelectric Station

There are enterprises of construction, as well as food industry, in Podporozhye. The Upper Svir Hydroelectric Station is located in Podporozhye.

=== Transportation ===
The railway connecting St. Petersburg and Murmansk passes Podporozhye.

A paved road connecting Lodeynoye Pole with Vytegra in Vologda Oblast passes Podporozhye as well. There are also local roads.

The Svir River is navigable and is a part of the Volga–Baltic Waterway, connecting the basins of the Volga and the Neva Rivers. There is regular cruise and cargo traffic along the waterway.

== Culture and recreation ==
The district contains two cultural heritage monuments of local significance, which are the Upper Svir Hydroelectric Station and a monument to soldiers fallen in World War II.

Podporozhye hosts the Podporozhye District Museum, which displays collections of local interest.

== Twin towns and sister cities ==
Podporozhye is twinned with:

- Steigen, Norway
