= Lodeynoye Pole =

Town in Leningrad Oblast, Russia

Lodeynoye Pole Лодейное Поле
- Town
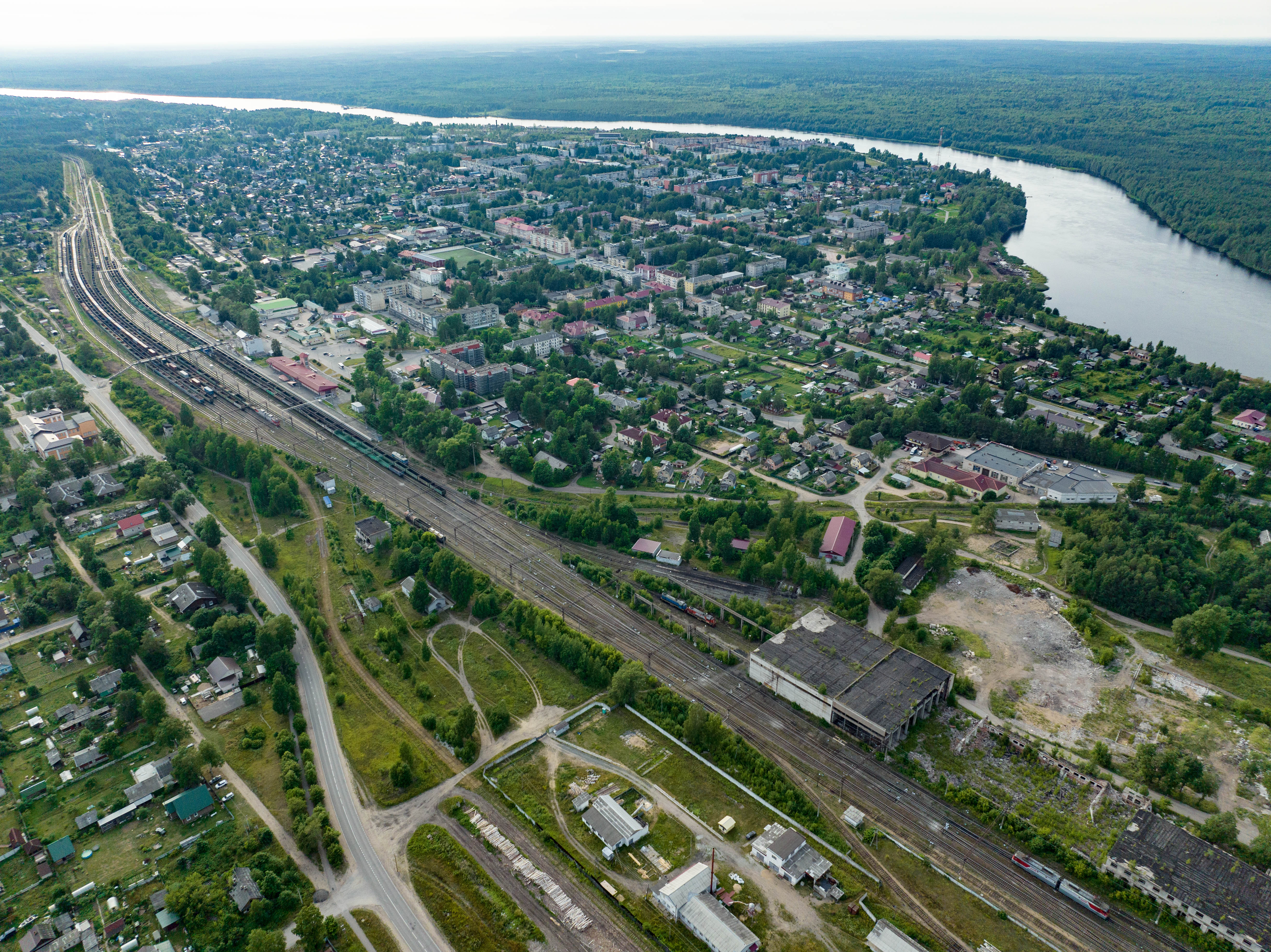
- Aerial view at the downtown and railway station

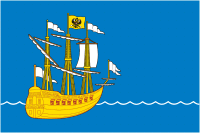
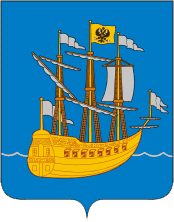
- Flag Coat of arms
- Interactive map of Lodeynoye Pole
- Location of Lodeynoye Pole Lodeynoye Pole (Leningrad Oblast)
- Coordinates: 60°43′N 33°33′E
- Country: Russia
- Federal subject: Leningrad Oblast
- Administrative district: Lodeynopolsky District
- Settlement municipal formationSelsoviet: Lodeynopolskoye Settlement Municipal Formation
- Founded: 1702
- Town status since: 1785
- Elevation: 15 m (49 ft)

Population (2010 Census)
  - Total: 20,674
  - Estimate (2024): 18,444 (−10.8%)

Administrative status
  - Capital of: Lodeynopolsky District, Lodeynopolskoye Settlement Municipal Formation

Municipal status
  - Municipal district: Lodeynopolsky Municipal District
  - Urban settlement: Lodeynopolskoye Urban Settlement
  - Capital of: Lodeynopolsky Municipal District, Lodeynopolskoye Urban Settlement
- Time zone: UTC+3 (MSK)
- Postal codes: 187700–187704, 187739, 187873
- OKTMO ID: 41627101001
- Website: www.admlod.ru

Lodeynoye Pole (Russian: Лоде́йное По́ле, lit. the field of boats) is a town and the administrative center of Lodeynopolsky District in Leningrad Oblast, Russia, located on the left bank of the Svir River (Lake Ladoga's basin) 244 kilometers (152 mi) northeast of Saint Petersburg. Population: 20,674 (2010 census); 22,830 (2002 census); 26,718 (1989 Soviet census); 21,400 (1972).

== History ==
It was founded in 1702 on the spot of the village of Mokrishvitsa, where Peter the Great had established the Olonets Shipyard. In 1703, the first ship of the Baltic Fleet was built here—a 28-cannon frigate called Shtandart. In 1704, six more frigates, four shnyavas, four galleys, and twenty-four semi-galleys were constructed, which would form the first Russian squadron in the Baltic Sea. Over four hundred sailboats and rowboats were built throughout the shipyard's existence.

In the course of the administrative reform carried out in 1708 by Peter the Great, Lodeynoye Pole was included into Ingermanland Governorate (known from 1710 as Saint Petersburg Governorate). In 1727, it was transferred to the newly established Novgorod Governorate, and in 1776, it was further transferred into newly established Olonets Oblast. In 1781, Olonets Oblast was transferred to St. Petersburg Governorate, and in 1784, it was transformed into an independent administrative unit, Olonets Viceroyalty. In 1785, Lodeynoye Pole was granted an uyezd town status.

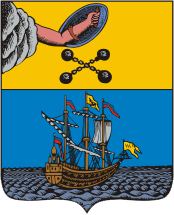
1788 coat of arms of Lodeynoye Pole

In 1799, Olonets Viceroyalty was abolished and divided between Novgorod and Arkhangelsk Governorates. Lodeynopolsky Uyezd was merged into Olonetsky Uyezd. In 1801, Olonets Governorate was established, and in 1802, Lodeynopolsky Uyezd was restored. In 1922, Olonets Governorate was abolished and Lodeynopolsky Uyezd was transferred to Petrograd Governorate (later Leningrad Oblast).

On August 1, 1927, the uyezds in Leningrad Oblast were abolished and Lodeynopolsky District, with the administrative center in Lodeynoye Pole, was established. It was a part of Lodeynoye Pole Okrug of Leningrad Oblast. In 1931, the infamous Soviet concentration camp Svirlag was established, with the headquarters in the former Alexander-Svirsky Monastery, several kilometers from Lodeynoye Pole. Thousands of victims (to a great extent Russian Orthodox clergy) lost there their lives. During World War II, Lodeynoye Pole was at the frontline but was not occupied by Finnish troops which kept the areas north of the Svir.

== Administrative and municipal status ==
Within the framework of administrative divisions, Lodeynoye Pole serves as the administrative center of Lodeynopolsky District. As an administrative division, it is, together with seven rural localities, incorporated within Lodeynopolsky District as Lodeynopolskoye Settlement Municipal Formation. As a municipal division, Lodeynopolskoye Settlement Municipal Formation is incorporated within Lodeynopolsky Municipal District as Lodeynopolskoye Urban Settlement.

== Economy ==
=== Industry ===
There are timber and food industry enterprises.

=== Transportation ===
The railway connecting St. Petersburg and Murmansk passes Lodeynoye Pole.

The M18 Highway, connecting St. Petersburg and Murmansk, passes Lodeynoye Pole as well. A paved road branches off east in Lodeynoye Pole and continues to Vytegra in Vologda Oblast via Podporozhye. There are also local roads.

The Volga–Baltic Waterway, connecting the basins of the Volga and the Neva Rivers, follows the Svir River. There is regular cruise and cargo traffic along the waterway.

=== Military ===
The town was home to Lodeynoye Pole air base, which hosted an interceptor aircraft regiment during the Cold War.

== Culture and recreation ==
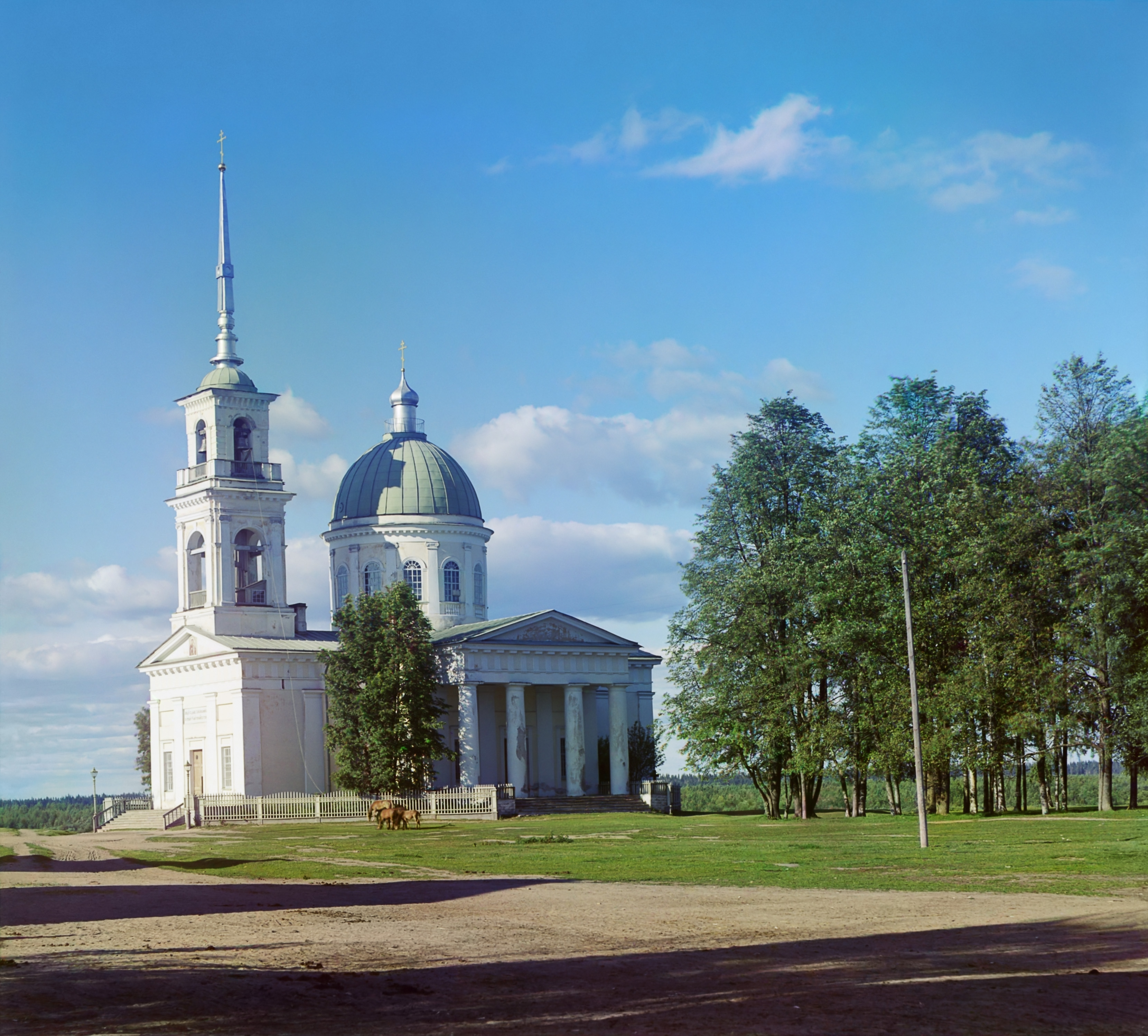
Cathedral of Sts. Peter and Paul, as photographed ca. 1912 by Sergey Prokudin-Gorsky. Demolished.

Lodeynoye Pole contains two cultural heritage monuments of federal significance and additionally seventeen objects classified as cultural and historical heritage of local significance. Most of these are the monuments commemorating the events of World War II. The Alexander-Svirsky Monastery, founded in the 15th century, is located in the village of Staraya Sloboda several kilometers northwest of Lodeynoye Pole.

The Lodeynoye Pole District Museum is located in the town and is the only state museum in the district.

== Twin towns and sister cities ==
Lodeynoye Pole is twinned with:

- Gildeskål, Norway
