= Lungachi =

Lungachi (Russian: Лунгачи) is the name of several rural localities in Volkhovsky District of Leningrad Oblast, Russia:

- Lungachi (settlement), a settlement at the railway station in Selivanovskoye Settlement Municipal Formation of Volkhovsky District in Leningrad Oblast; 60°7′N 32°39′E
- Lungachi (village), a village in Selivanovskoye Settlement Municipal Formation of Volkhovsky District in Leningrad Oblast; 60°9′N 32°41′E
