= Dormition Cathedral, Staraya Ladoga =

Dormition Cathedral
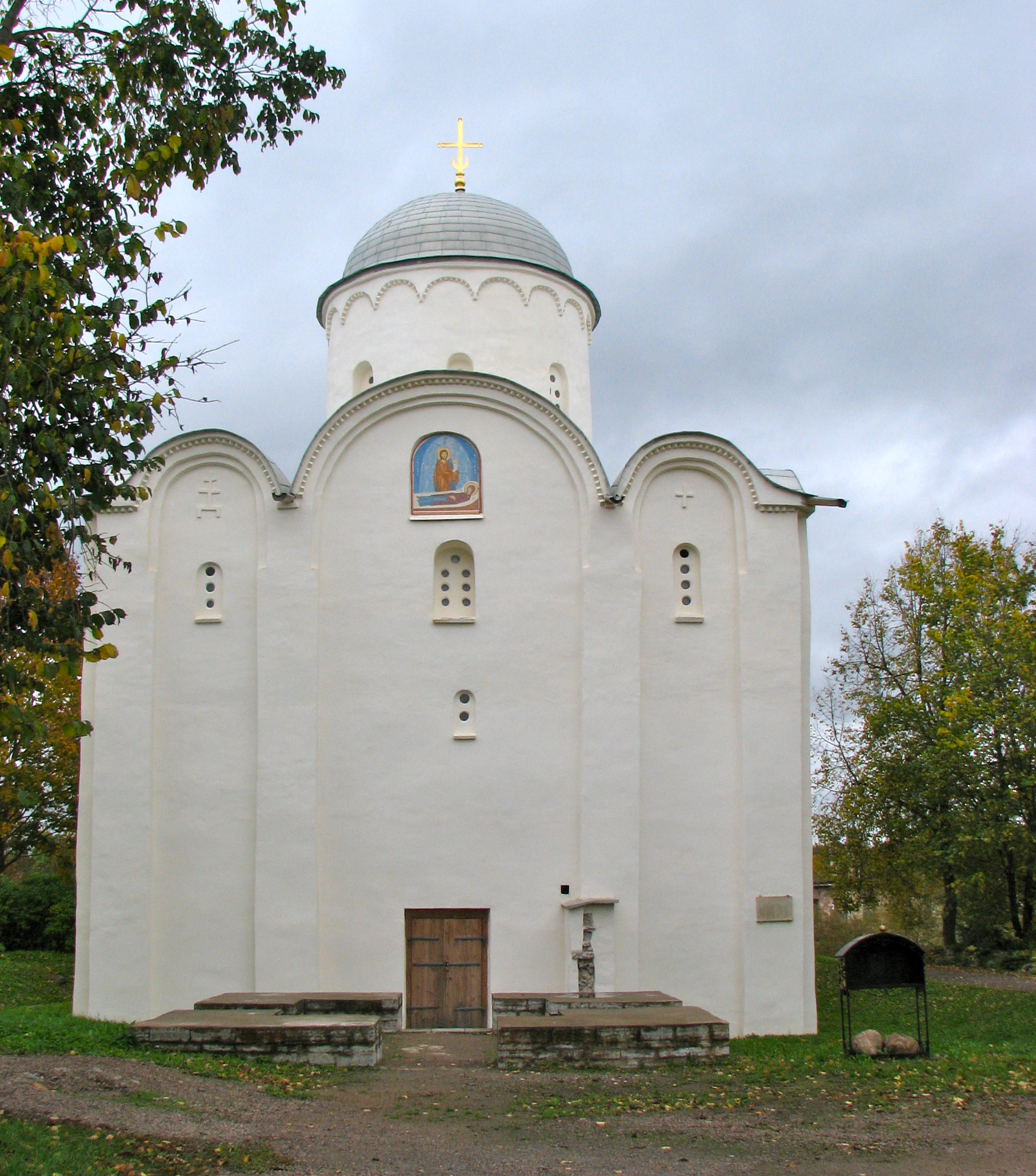
- Dormition Cathedral
- Dormition Cathedral
- 60°00′08.66″N 32°17′39.07″E
- Location: Staraya Ladoga
- Country: Russia
- Denomination: Russian Orthodox

History
- Dedication: Dormition of the Theotokos

Architecture
- Style: Russian
- Completed: The third quarter of the 12th century

Dormition Cathedral (Russian: Успенский Собор) in the selo of Staraya Ladoga, Volkhovsky District, Leningrad Oblast, Russia is one of the oldest churches of Russia, dating from the second half of the 12th century. It is one of the few surviving pre-Mongol buildings in Russia, and the northernmost one. The cathedral is the katholikon of the female Dormition Monastery, one of the several monasteries in Staraya Ladoga, and is located on the left bank of the Volkhov River. The building was designated an architectural monument of federal significance (#4710028015).

== History ==
Staraya Ladoga was the first seat of Rurik in 862, and, after Rurik moved the seat to Novgorod, remained in the Novgorod Lands. It controlled one of the most important waterways at the time, the Trade route from the Varangians to the Greeks, of which the Volkhov River was a part of. The cathedral was built presumably in the third quarter of the 12th century by Novgorodians. It was rebuilt several times since. In 1761, a side-chapel was built at the northern side of the cathedral, and in 1854-1856 another two were built at the western side, and a bell-tower was erected. In 1925, the cathedral was closed for service. In the 1950s, a complex restoration was performed, the side chapels and the bell-tower were demolished. In 2005, the cathedral was returned to the Russian Orthodox Church.

== Architecture ==
The cathedral is made of plinthite and has a very simple composition. The western wall has two relief crosses.

== Frescoes ==
In the 12th century, the interior of the church was covered by frescoes. The 20th century restorations uncovered approximately 50 square metres (540 ft^{2}) of the original painting, but most of them in fragments, so that it is difficult to reconstruct the original topics and disposition. The frescoes seem to be close in style to those in Polotsk and in Veliky Novgorod.
