= List of buildings of pre-Mongol Rus' =

The architecture of Kievan Rus' is the earliest period of Belarusian, Russian, and Ukrainian architecture. It developed on the foundations of Byzantine culture with use of local innovations and architectural features, with Kiev and Novgorod as its principal centers. Although wooden architecture was widespread in the Kievan Rus', none of it has survived; all surviving buildings are constructed of stone or brick. Most of these buildings are churches, with only four secular buildings surviving from the period.

The vast majority of buildings was destroyed over the centuries, with most extensive losses occurring during the Mongol invasion of the 1230s. Those that survived were significantly modified over time and lost some essential features of the Kievan Rus' architecture. Several monuments were destroyed in the 20th century and later reconstructed incorporating remains of the original structure; such buildings are included in the list. Buildings that were destroyed but retain significant visible remains are presented in a separate section. In contrast, buildings that were destroyed and subsequently rebuilt without attempts at scientific reconstruction (e.g., the Dormition Church of Virgin Pirogoshcha and the Saint Michael Cathedral of St. Michael's Golden-Domed Monastery in Kyiv) are excluded.

== List ==
Surviving buildings of pre-Mongol Rus'
Name	Photo	Location (Note: Modern settlement and country where the building is located.)	Land (Note: Rus' principality or land where the building was located. This is a rough division as the exact boundaries were not fixed and only the major principalities are included.)	Construction date	Comments
Transfiguration Cathedral		Chernihiv, Ukraine	Chernigov	Before 1036	One of the two oldest surviving buildings of the Kievan Rus'. The exterior was considerably modified in the 17th and 18th centuries.
Cathedral of Saint Boris and Saint Gleb		Chernihiv, Ukraine	Chernigov	1097–1123	
Dormition Cathedral of Yeletskyi Monastery		Chernihiv, Ukraine	Chernigov	Early 12th century	Exterior was considerably altered.
St. Elijah Church		Chernihiv, Ukraine	Chernigov	Early 12th century	Exterior was considerably altered.
Piatnytska Church		Chernihiv, Ukraine	Chernigov	Early 13th century	Considerably damaged during World War II, subsequently restored.
Saint Pantaleon Church		Shevchenkove, Ukraine	Galicia	c. 1200	Rebuilt in 1611 with considerable modifications, restored in 1998. The only surviving building of the Galician school of architecture.
Saint Boris and Saint Gleb Kalozha Church		Grodno, Belarus	Grodno	Before 1183	Partially survived, some walls were lost.
Saint George's Cathedral		Kaniv, Ukraine	Kiev	1144	Only the walls.
Saint Sophia Cathedral		Kyiv, Ukraine	Kiev	1017–1022 or before 1037	One of the two oldest surviving buildings of the Kievan Rus'. The exterior was considerably modified in the 17th and 18th centuries.
Golden Gate		Kyiv, Ukraine	Kiev	1037	By 1982, the gate was a ruin, and, with the exception of the lowest parts of the walls, it was reconstructed in 1982.
Dormition Cathedral of the Kyiv Pechersk Lavra		Kyiv, Ukraine	Kiev	1073–1089	Destroyed in 1941, reconstructed in 2000. The exterior was considerably altered in the 18th century.
Trinity Church of the Kyiv Pechersk Lavra		Kyiv, Ukraine	Kiev	c. 1106	The exterior was considerably altered in the 18th century.
Saint Michael Church of the Vydubychi Monastery		Kyiv, Ukraine	Kiev	1070–1088	Only the western side.
Church of the Saviour at Berestove		Kyiv, Ukraine	Kiev	Early 11th century	Only the western side.
St. Cyrils' Church of the St. Cyril's Monastery		Kyiv, Ukraine	Kiev	1140–1146	Exterior was strongly altered.
Saint Basil Church		Ovruch, Ukraine	Kiev	c. 1190	Collapsed in 1846, restored in 1907–09.
Katholikon of the Ivanovsky Monastery		Pskov, Russia	Novgorod	1140s or earlier	
Katholikon of the Mirozhsky Monastery		Pskov, Russia	Novgorod	Before 1156	The exterior was altered, the frescoes are intact
Katholikon of the Dormition Monastery		Staraya Ladoga, Russia	Novgorod	1160s	
St. George's Church		Staraya Ladoga, Russia	Novgorod	c. 1165	
Katholikon of the Transfiguration Monastery		Staraya Russa, Russia	Novgorod	1198	Completely rebuilt in the 1442, only the lowest parts of the walls survived. Rebuilt again in the 17th century.
Cathedral of Saint Sophia		Veliky Novgorod, Russia	Novgorod	1045–1052	The oldest surviving building in Northern Russia.
Saint Nicholas Cathedral at Yaroslav's Court		Veliky Novgorod, Russia	Novgorod	1113–1136	
Katholikon of the Antoniev Monastery		Veliky Novgorod, Russia	Novgorod	1117–1122	The upper parts were altered.
Katholikon of the Yuriev Monastery		Veliky Novgorod, Russia	Novgorod	1119–1130	
Arkazhi Church		Veliky Novgorod, Russia	Novgorod	1179	Substantially rebuilt in the 17th century.
Sts. Peter and Paul Church		Veliky Novgorod, Russia	Novgorod	1192	
Nereditsa Church		Veliky Novgorod, Russia	Novgorod	1198	Destroyed during the World War II, subsequently restored, but the original frescoes have been lost.
Church of St. Paraskevi of Iconium		Veliky Novgorod, Russia	Novgorod	1207	The vaults rebuilt at a later date.
Peryn Chapel		Veliky Novgorod, Russia	Novgorod	1220s	
Saint Michael Church		Oster, Ukraine	Pereyaslavl	c. 1098	Destroyed, only the apse survived.
Saint Sophia Cathedral in Polotsk		Polotsk, Belarus	Polotsk	1044–1066	Only fragments of the original cathedral survived.
Transfiguration Church of the Saint Euphrosyne Monastery		Polotsk, Belarus	Polotsk	1128-1156	
Annunciation Church		Vitebsk, Belarus	Polotsk	12th century	Destroyed in 1961, rebuilt in 1993–1998 incorporating the remains of the walls.
Church of Saint Peter and Saint Paul on Gorodyanka		Smolensk, Russia	Smolensk	1146	Restored in 1963
Church of Saint John the Evangelist		Smolensk, Russia	Smolensk	1146	Only walls survived, everything else was rebuilt in the 18th century.
Saint Michael Church		Smolensk, Russia	Smolensk	1180–1197	The roof was altered.
Andrey Bogolyubsky Palace		Bogolyubovo, Russia	Vladimir-Suzdal	1158	Only fragments, including a tower, survived.
Church of the Intercession on the Nerl		Bogolyubovo, Russia	Vladimir-Suzdal	1165-1166	
Church of Boris and Gleb		Kideksha, Russia	Vladimir-Suzdal	1152	The top part was rebuilt in the 17th century.
Transfiguration Cathedral		Pereslavl-Zalessky, Russia	Vladimir-Suzdal	1152–1157	
Nativity Cathedral		Suzdal, Russia	Vladimir-Suzdal	1222–1225	The exterior and the roof have been rebuilt.
Dormition Cathedral		Vladimir, Russia	Vladimir-Suzdal	1158–1160	Expanded in 1185–1189
Golden Gate		Vladimir, Russia	Vladimir-Suzdal	1158–1164	Considerably altered by later construction.
Cathedral of Saint Demetrius		Vladimir, Russia	Vladimir-Suzdal	1191 or 1194–1197	
Dormition Cathedral of the Knyaginin Monastery		Vladimir, Russia	Vladimir-Suzdal	1200–1202	Completely rebuilt around 1500, only lower parts of the walls survive.
Saint George Cathedral		Yuryev-Polsky, Russia	Vladimir-Suzdal	1230–1234	The cathedral collapsed in the 1460s and was repaired in a different form.
Dormition Church		Dorohobuzh, Ukraine	Volhynia	c. 12th century	Rebuilt in 16th century, incorporating parts of the original walls.
Stołpie Tower		Stołpie, Poland	Volhynia	12th–13th centuries	Partially ruined
Dormition Cathedral		Volodymyr, Ukraine	Volhynia	1160	Collapsed in 1829, rebuilt in 1896–1900.

=== Remains ===
This section presents pre-Mongol Rus' buildings that were partially destroyed and have significant surviving visible remains but were not rebuilt.

Surviving buildings of pre-Mongol Rus'
Name	Photo	Location	Land	Construction date	Comments
Dormition Cathedral		Krylos, Ukraine	Galicia	Before 1187	Parts of the wall and foundations were used to construct a chapel (15th century) and a church (16th century) above the remains.
Stone wall		Grodno, Belarus	Grodno	12th century	
Lower church		Grodno, Belarus	Grodno	Late 12th century	
Palace		Grodno, Belarus	Grodno	Late 12th century	
Tomb church		Pereiaslav, Ukraine	Pereyaslavl	11th century	
St. Michael's Church		Pereiaslav, Ukraine	Pereyaslavl	1089	
Church		Turov, Belarus	Turov	12th century	
St. John the Evangelist Church		Lutsk, Ukraine	Volhynia	12th century	
