= Transfiguration Church, Polotsk =

Coordinates: 55°30′14.74″N 28°46′50.81″E

Polotsk Transfiguration Church
- Спаса-Праабражэнская царква
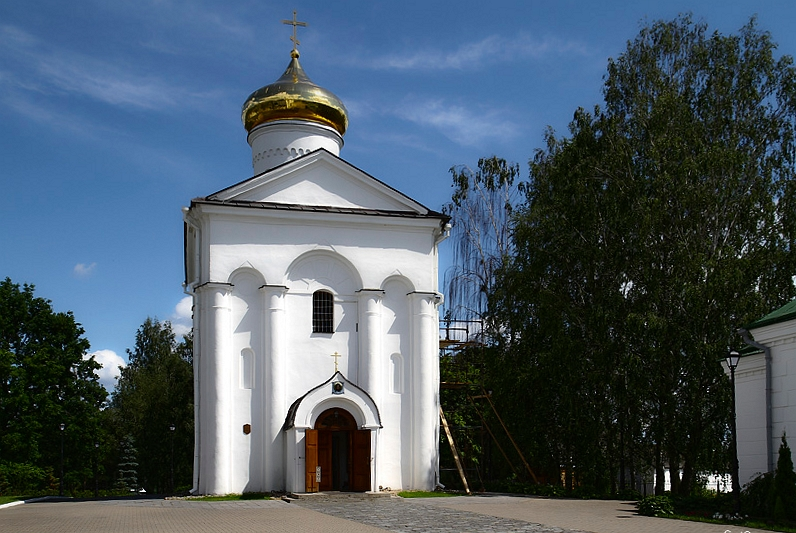
- The church in 2014
- Polotsk Transfiguration Church
- Country: Belarus
- Denomination: Eastern Orthodox Church

Architecture
- Functional status: Active
- Completed: 12th century

Transfiguration Church (Belarusian: Спаса-Праабражэнская царква, romanized: Spasa-Praabraženskaja carkva) of the St. Euphrosine monastery in Polotsk, Belarus is a unique monument of pre-Mongol Rus' architecture. Built in the 12th century, it was reconstructed in the 17th and the 19th centuries. Despite the reconstructions, the church has preserved the original Medieval frescoes.

== History ==
=== Architecture ===
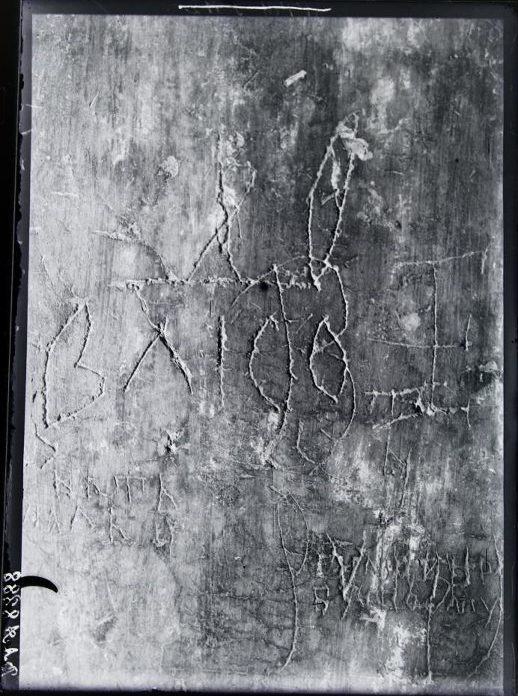
Ancient graffiti in the church

The church was constructed in the middle of the 1150s. Manuscripts about Euphrosyne of Polotsk mention that some ‘Ivan, head of church builders’ was the architect. According to Pavel Rappoport, the architect was in advance of his time and created a unique example of ‘Russian Gothic’ that dominated Old Russian architecture until the 12th century.

The sixbased square church has one apse a dynamic vertical silhouette. To further emphasize it, the zakomaras, Brovka and Kokoshniks are styled in long vertical shapes, while the side naves are narrowed.

In the 17th to 19th centuries the roof was rebuilt. In the 1830s the church dilapidated, but the contemporaries understood its high historical value and restored it.

=== Frescoes ===
The researchers date the frescoes to the early 12th century; most likely, the church was painted between 1133 and 1145 by order of Euphrosyne of Polotsk. She is also believed to be the author of the layout of the paintings. The art style clearly demonstrates traces of the Byzantine ancestry, however, the artists could also be influenced by the Romanesque art. The 12th century frescoes are uniquely intact and well-preserved. The paintings include images of the Orans, Nativity of Jesus, Flight into Egypt, etc. There are also some rare scenes like ‘St Anthony and centaur’.

During the restoration of the 19th century new frescoes were painted in 1835 and 1884. Modern restotators in 2006-2017 managed to save both layers, they extracted the younger frescoes and transferred them to a new base. The 19th century frescoes nowadays are displayed in the Art Gallery of the Polotsk National History and Art Museum.

The contemporary researchers also discovered numerous valuable examples of Medieval literacy - the graffiti, written on the walls, altar, stairs and other parts of the church. The writings belong to five different historical periods and vary in purpose. There are commemorations, autographs, clerical and educational texts, even everyday notes and penancies.

=== Contemporary Research ===
In 2015 the archeologists discovered underground galleries and an exonarthex. Even more, a whole underground church was found at 3 meters depth. Presumably, Euphrosyne's father Svyatoslav Vyacheslavovich was buried there. The hidden church has its own altar, its walls and ceiling were decorated with frescoes.

During the excavations, the archeologists found more than 10.000 pieces of frescoes and miscellaneous objects such as a part of horace, mosaics and floor tiles, a lead roofing sheet, a stamp for Euphrosyne's personal seal. Among other artifacts, the archeologists found a piece of plinthiform brick with the construction scheme of the church. The unexpected discovery is a dollar coin of the 1920s.

== Sources ==
- Kalechiz, I. L. (2020). Граффити Спасо-Преображенской церкви г. Полоцка: предварительные итоги изучения [Graffiti in Polotsk Transfiguration Church: Preliminary Research Results]. Dmitry Pozharsky University. p. 261. ISBN 978-5-91244-261-2.
- Mayorov, A. V.; Veselov, F. N. (2016). "К атрибуции евфросиньевских печатей с изображением Спасителя из Новгорода и Полоцка" [For the Attribution of the Euphrosyne’s Seals with Image of the Savior from Novgorod and Polotsk]. Paleorossiya (in Russian) (5): 273–285. doi:10.24411/9999-0702-2016-00019.
- Sarabyanov, V. D. (2011). "Тема передачи Божественной Премудрости в росписях Спасской церкви Евфросиньева монастыря в Полоцке" [The Transition of the Heavenly Wisdom in the Murals of the Transfiguration Church of the Euphrosiniev Monastery in Polotsk]. Journal of Saint Tikhon's Orthodox University (in Russian). 1 (4): 7–25.
- Skobtsova, D. A. (2019). "The history of study of the murals in the south chapel of the Church of the Transfiguration of Our Saviour at Polotsk". Literary Criticism. Linguistics. Cultural Studies" Series RSUH/ RGGU (1): 162–174.
