= St. George's Church, Staraya Ladoga =

St. George's Church
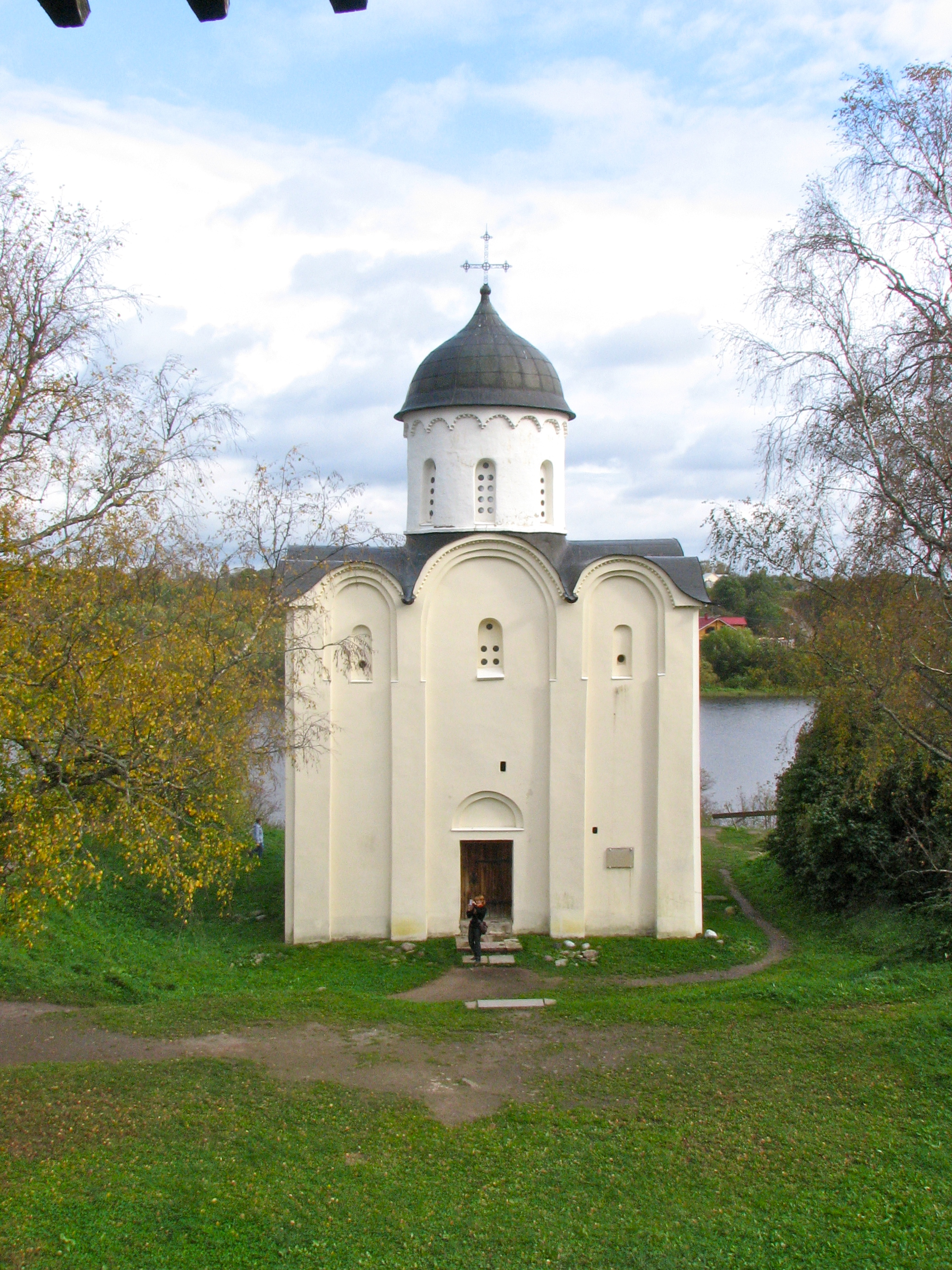
- View from the wall of the fortress
- St. George's Church
- 59°59′50.60″N 32°17′54.40″E
- Location: Staraya Ladoga
- Country: Russia
- Denomination: Russian Orthodox

History
- Dedication: Saint George

Architecture
- Style: Russian
- Completed: Between 1180 and 1200

St. George's Church (Russian: Геóргиевская цéрковь, цéрковь Святóго Геóргия) in the selo of Staraya Ladoga, Volkhovsky District, Leningrad Oblast, Russia is one of the oldest churches of Russia, dating from the second half of the 12th century. It is one of the few surviving pre-Mongol buildings in Russia. It contains the frescoes of the 12th century, extremely rare in Russia. The church is located within the Staraya Ladoga Fortress, on the left bank of the Volkhov River. The building was designated an architectural monument of federal significance (#4710025007).

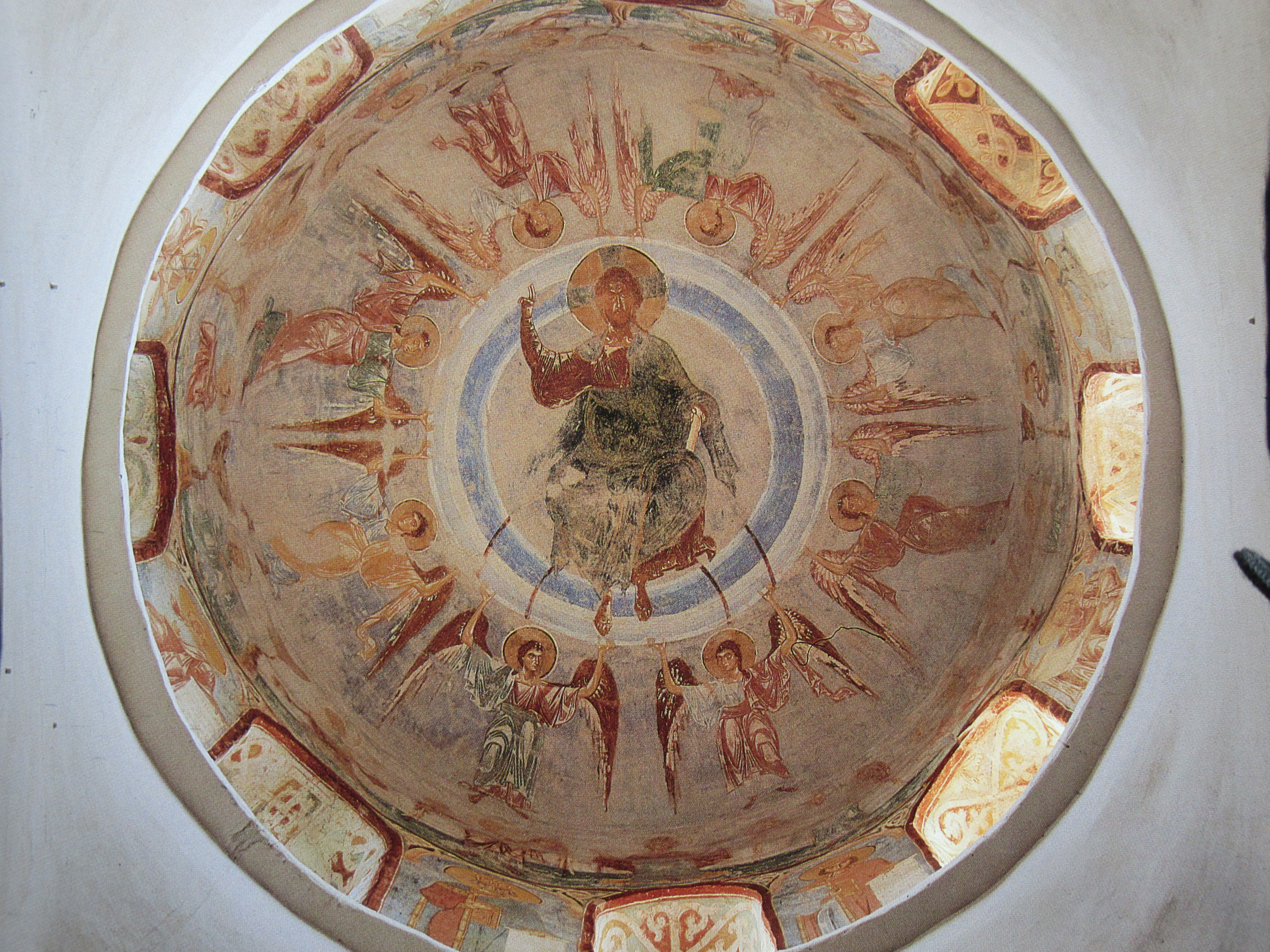
Ceiling fresco depicting Jesus with angels

== History ==
Staraya Ladoga was the first seat of Rurik in 862, and, after Rurik moved the seat to Novgorod, remained in the Novgorod Lands. It controlled one of the most important European waterways at the time, the Trade route from the Varangians to the Greeks, of which the Volkhov River was a part. The stone construction in Staraya Ladoga started either in 1114 or 1116, and in the second half of the 12th century seven or eight stone churches were built, of which only two have survived to our days. The exact year of construction of St. George's Church is unknown, but the details of architecture and painting show that it was built between 1180 and 1200. It was first mentioned only in 1445. The church was rebuilt in the end of the 16th century, but only the exterior was slightly altered. By the end of the 17th century, the interior of the church badly needed to be renovated, and the renovation was made in 1683-1684. During this renovation, new windows were made, and many of the frescoes from the walls were lost. The restorations were also carried out in 1902, 1925-1928, 1952-1962, and in the 1970s - 1990s.

== Architecture ==
The architecture of the church is typical for Novgorod. The church is based on four pillars and has one dome and three apses. The church is small (the area of the floor is 72 square metres (780 ft^{2}) and slightly asymmetric with respect to the north-south direction). This is explained by the fact that the church was built inside an existing fortress, and the space was quite limited.

== Painting ==
Frescoes were painted in the same year as the church was opened. This is one of the few examples of the 12th-century frescoes in Russia. In 1445, some of the frescoes were renovated, with the emphasis on the careful reproduction of the old ones. Most of the original frescoes were lost in the 17th century. Some of them were removed from the walls and left under the new floor. These were discovered in the 20th century and restored. In 1780, some of the old frescoes were discovered on the walls. In total, about 20% of the original frescoes survived.

The whole original painting can not be reconstructed, however, it is clear that the northern and the southern walls had five rows of images each. Nothing survived from the frescoes of the western and the eastern walls. The frescoes of the dome were almost left intact. They depict the Ascension of Jesus. Below, the Apostles and the Prophets are painted.

All frescoes were made in the same style. Most likely, they were made by a group of painters, two of whom were the principal ones. Sky blue, red, and yellow colours dominate. There are also some colour variations, including the usage of white colour, which are not typical for Eastern Orthodox frescoes of the time and only have some parallels with the Byzantine painting, which gives a hint that the painters were Greek.
