= Volkhovsky District =

Volkhovsky District Волховский район (Russian)
- District
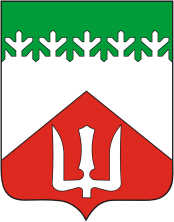
- Flag Coat of arms
- Location of Volkhovsky District in Leningrad Oblast
- Coordinates: 59°55′N 32°21′E
- Country: Russia
- Federal subject: Leningrad Oblast
- Established: September 1927
- Administrative center: Volkhov

Area
  - Total: 5,124.4 km^{2} (1,978.5 sq mi)

Population (2010 Census)
  - Total: 48,000
  - Density: 9.4/km^{2} (24/sq mi)
  - Urban: 47.0%
  - Rural: 53.0%

Administrative structure
  - Administrative divisions: 12 settlement municipal formation
  - Inhabited localities: 3 cities/towns, 277 rural localities

Municipal structure
  - Municipally incorporated as: Volkhovsky Municipal District
  - Municipal divisions: 3 urban settlements, 12 rural settlements
- Time zone: UTC+3 (MSK)
- OKTMO ID: 41609000
- Website: http://www.volkhov-raion.ru/

Volkhovsky District (Russian: Во́лховский райо́н) is an administrative and municipal district (raion), one of the seventeen in Leningrad Oblast, Russia. It is located in the central eastern part of the oblast and borders with Lodeynopolsky District in the northeast, Tikhvinsky District in the southeast, Kirishsky District in the south, and with Kirovsky District in the west. In the north, it is washed by Lake Ladoga. The area of the district is 5,124.4 square kilometers (1,978.5 sq mi). Its administrative center is the town of Volkhov. Population (excluding the administrative center): 48,000 (2010 census); 50,799 (2002 Census); 58,939 (1989 Soviet census).

== Geography ==
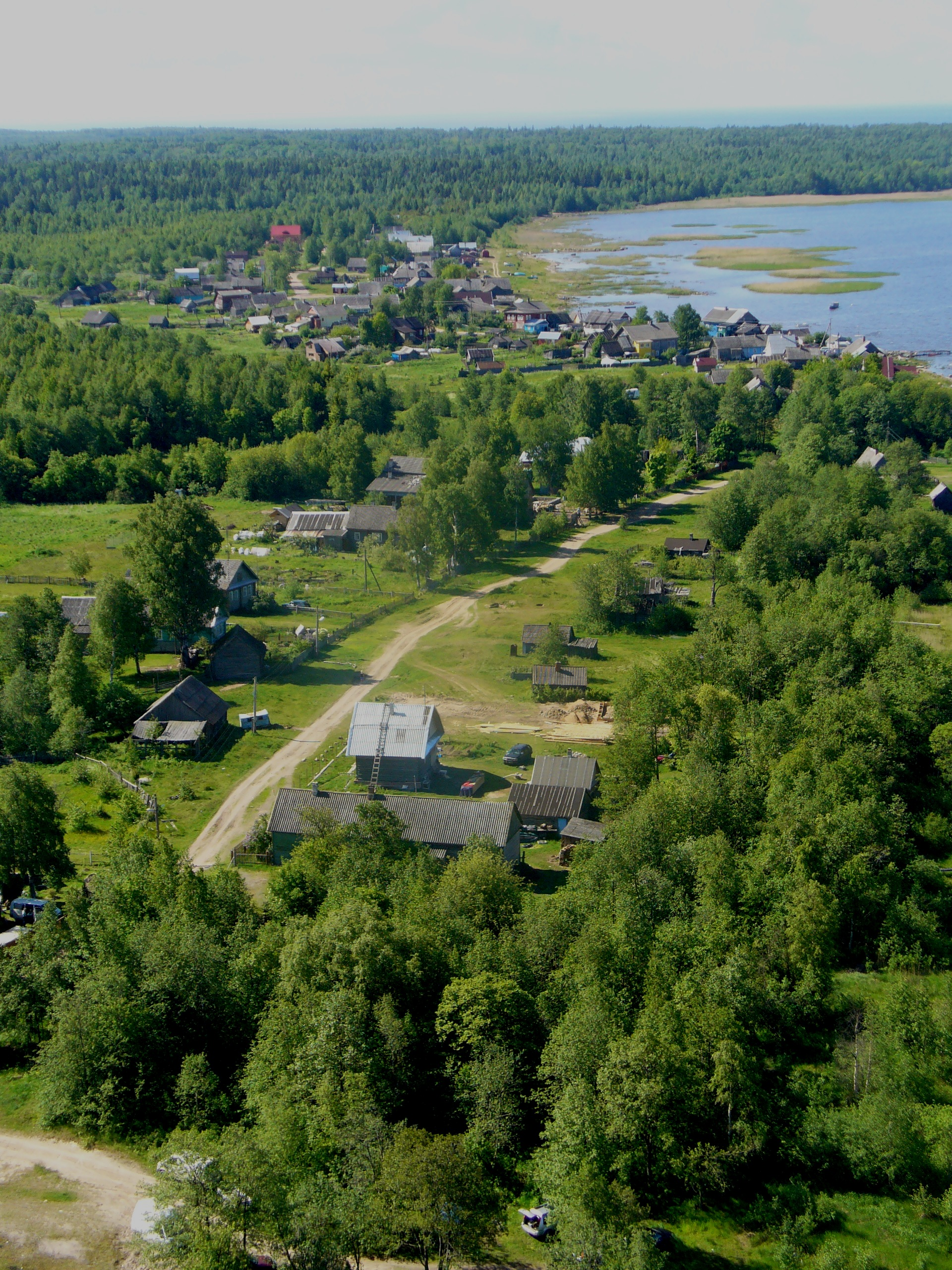
Panorama of the village of Storozhno on the shore of Lake Ladoga

The whole area of the district belongs to the drainage basin of Lake Ladoga. The main river in the western part of the district is the Volkhov, and the center of the district belongs to the river basin of the Syas. Both the Volkhov and the Syas are major tributaries of Lake Ladoga. The Volkhov is dammed by the Volkhov Hydroelectric Station, which became the first large-scale hydroelectric plant built in the Soviet Union. The northern part of the district belongs to the basin of the Pasha, a left tributary of the Svir. The lower course of the Svir forms the border between Lodeynopolsky and Volkhovsky District.

== History ==
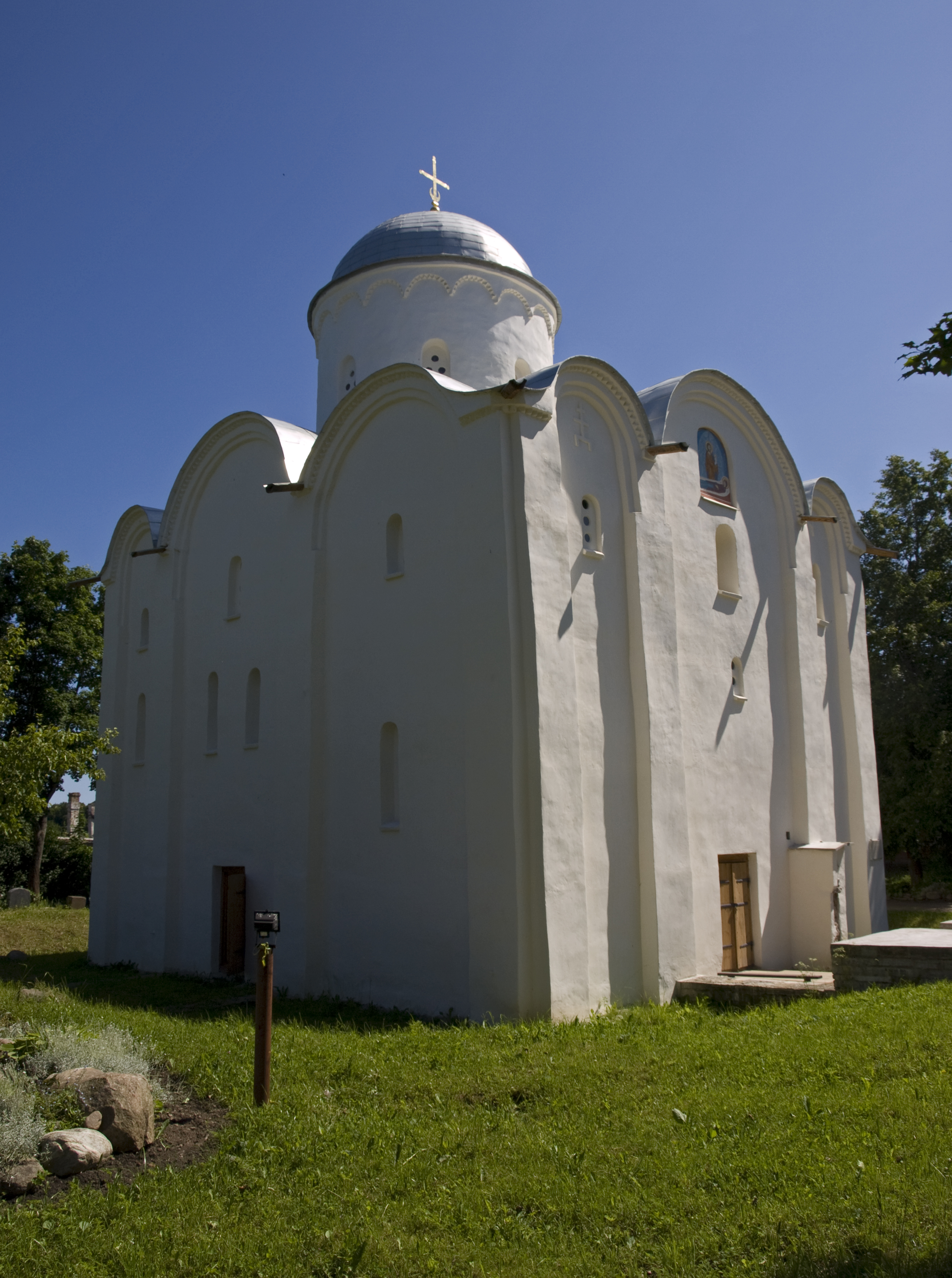
The Assumption Cathedral, Staraya Ladoga

Staraya Ladoga, currently a selo located in the district, was mentioned in 862, as one of five original Russian towns (the other being Belozersk, Novgorod, Polotsk, and Rostov). According to the Primary Chronicle, Rurik established his residence in Ladoga before moving to Novgorod, and thus Staraya Ladoga is sometimes considered as the first historical capital of Russia. The Volkhov River served as a part of the trade route from the Varangians to the Greeks.

After the capital was moved to Novgorod, the area remained a part of Novgorod Lands, subsequently of the Novgorod Republic. After the fall of the republic, it was, together will all Novgorod Lands, annexed by the Grand Duchy of Moscow. The area was included into Obozerskaya Pyatina, one of the pyatinas which Novgorod Lands were divided into.

In the course of the administrative reform carried out in 1708 by Peter the Great, the area was included into Ingermanland Governorate (known since 1710 as Saint Petersburg Governorate) as Ladozhsky Uyezd with the center in Staraya Ladoga. In 1727, separate Novgorod Governorate was split off, the uyezd was transformed into Novoladozhsky Uyezd, and the administrative center was moved to Novaya Ladoga. In 1776, the area was transferred to Novgorod Viceroyalty, and in 1781, it was moved back into Saint Petersburg Governorate. On December 9, 1922 the administrative center of the uyezd was moved to the selo of Gostinopolye, which was renamed Volkhov and was granted town status. The uyezd was renamed Volkhovsky. In 1924 the changes were rolled back, the administrative center moved to Novaya Ladoga, and Volkhov was demoted to a selo (eventually renamed Gostinopolye). The name of the uyezd remained Volkhovsky. Saint Petersburg Governorate was twice renamed, to Petrograd Governorate and subsequently to Leningrad Governorate.

On August 1, 1927, the uyezds were abolished and Volkhovsky District, with the administrative center in the urban-type settlement of Zvanka, was established. The governorates were also abolished, and the district was a part of Leningrad Okrug of Leningrad Oblast. It included parts of former Volkhovsky Uyezd. On July 23, 1930, the okrugs were abolished as well, and the districts were directly subordinated to the oblast. On December 27, 1933 the urban-type settlement of Zvanka was granted town status and renamed Volkhovstroy. On September 19, 1939 Volkhovstroy was made a town of oblast significance, and on April 11, 1940, it was renamed Volkhov. Between October and December 1941, during World War II, parts of the district were occupied by German troops. In 2010, the administrative division of Leningrad Oblast was harmonized with the municipal division, and Volkhov was made the town of district significance.

On March 20, 1946, Novoladozhsky District with the administrative center located in Novaya Ladoga was split off Volkhovsky District. On February 1, 1963 Novoladozhsky District was abolished and merged into Volkhovsky District.

On August 1, 1927, Mginsky District, with the administrative center in the settlement of Mga, was established. It was a part of Leningrad Okrug of Leningrad Oblast. It included parts of former Volkhovsky and Leningradsky Uyezds. On September 20, 1930, the administrative center of the district was transferred to the selo of Putilovo, and the district renamed Putilovsky. On September 20, 1931 the district center was moved back to Mga, and the district was renamed back Mginsky. Between September 1941 and January 1944, during World War II, parts of the district were occupied by German troops. On December 9, 1960 Mginsky District was abolished and split between Volkhovsky and Tosnensky Districts. On April 1, 1977 Kirovsky District, essentially in the limits of former Mginsky District, was established by splitting off Volkhovsky and Tosnensky Districts.

On August 1, 1927, Pashsky District, with the administrative center in the village of Pashsky Perevoz, was established. It was a part of Lodeynoye Pole Okrug of Leningrad Oblast. It included parts of former Volkhovsky and Lodeynopolsky Uyezds. On December 14, 1955 Pashsky District was abolished and merged into Novoladozhsky District.

== Economy ==
=== Industry ===
Big industrial enterprises in the district include the Volkhov Hydroelectric Station and an aluminum plant in Volkhov, and a pulp-and-paper mill in Syasstroy. There are also enterprises of timber and food industries.

=== Agriculture ===
Agriculture in the district specializes on cattle breeding, with meat and milk production, and on fish farming.

=== Transportation ===
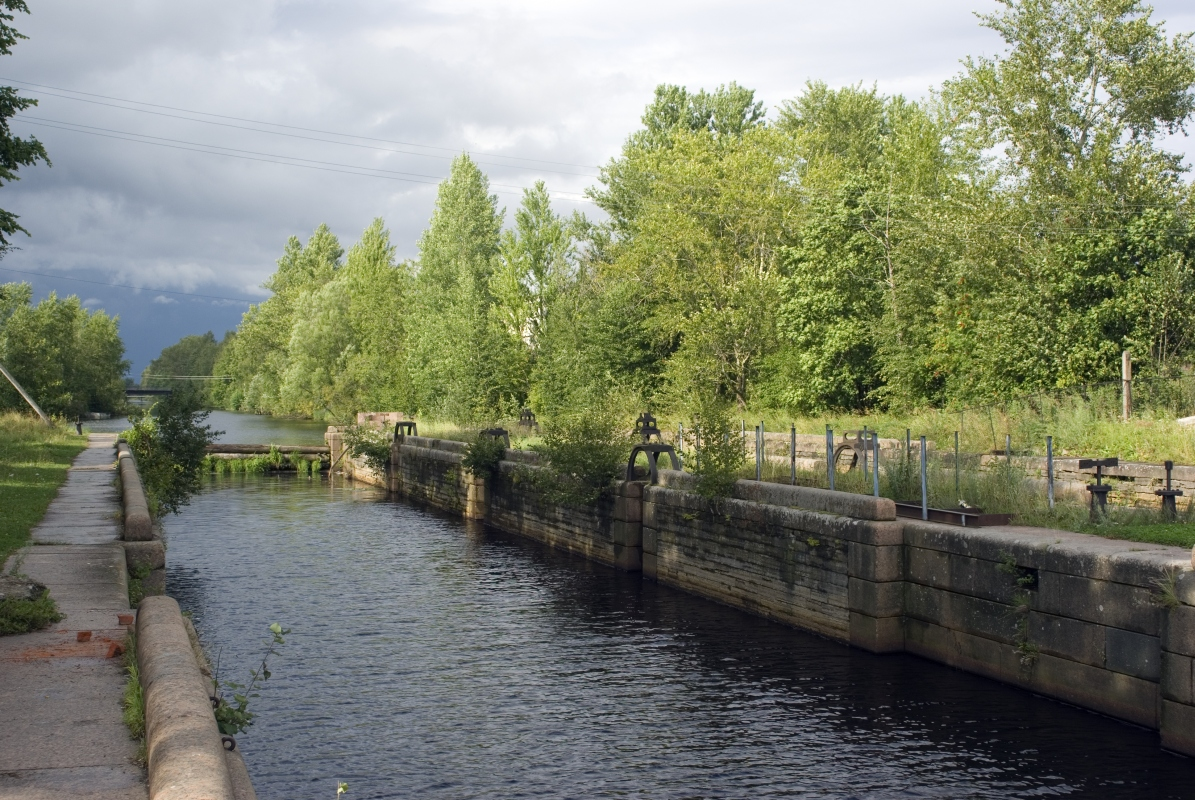
A lock of the Old Ladoga Canal (disused) in the town of Novaya Ladoga.

Volkhov (railway stations Volkhovstroy I and Volkhovstroy II) is an important railway hub. One railway line connects in with Saint Petersburg (Moskovsky Rail Terminal), and Volkhovstroy I is the terminal station of suburban trains from Saint Petersburg. To the east, a railway line continues to Vologda via Tikhvin and Cherepovets. Another railway line passing through Volkhov connects Chudovo in the south and Lodeynoye Pole, Petrozavodsk, and ultimately Murmansk in the north. In Chudovo, it connects to railway between Saint Petersburg and Moscow, so that all traffic between Moscow and Murmansk proceeds via Volkhovstroy.

The M18 highway, connecting Saint Petersburg and Murmansk, crosses the northern part of the district. In Kiselnya, a road branches off southeast and proceeds via Volkhov, Tikhvin, and Cherepovets to Vologda. Volkhov is also connected by a road with Kirishi. There are also local roads, with bus traffic originating from Volkhov.

The Volkhov River is navigable within the district, however, there is no passenger navigation. In the beginning of the 19th century, a system of canals bypassing Lake Ladoga were built, which at the time were a part of Mariinsky Water System, connecting the Neva River and the Volga River. In particular, the Svir Canal connects the Svir and the Syas, and the Syas Canal connects the Syas and the Volkhov. The New Ladoga Canal connects the Volkhov and the Neva. It replaced the Old Ladoga Canal, built by Peter the Great, which thus became disused and decayed. The four canals collectively are known as the Ladoga Canal.

== Culture and recreation ==
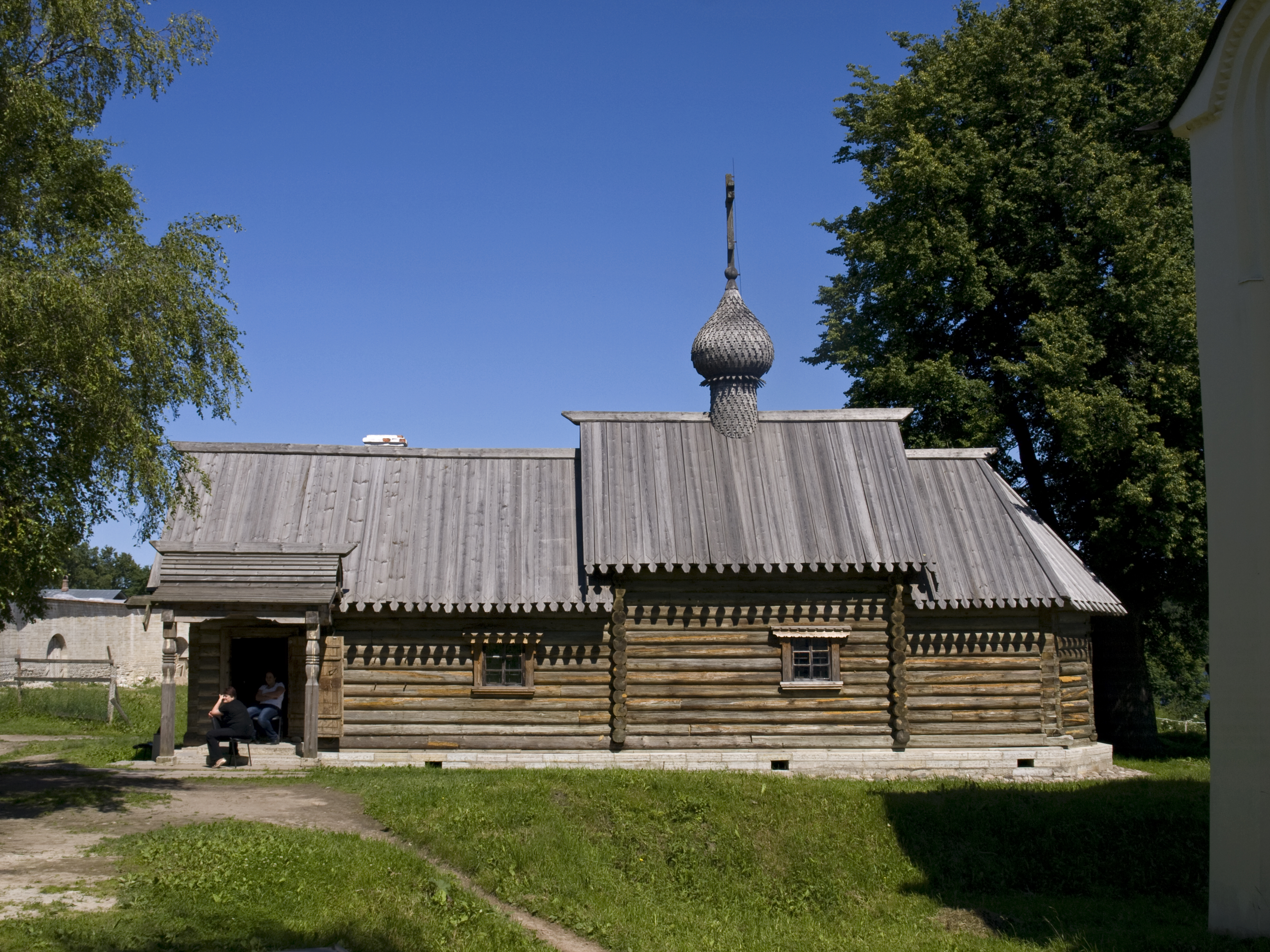
Church of Saint Dimitry of Thessaloniki, Staraya Ladoga

The district contains 84 cultural heritage monuments of federal significance and additionally 164 objects classified as cultural and historical heritage of local significance. The federal monuments include, among others, the Volkhov Hydroelectric station, the complex of the Zelenets Trinity Monastery in the former selo of Zelenets, and the ensemble of Staraya Ladoga.

Staraya Ladoga is one of the oldest settlements in Russia and contains two of several dozens survived pre-Mongol buildings in Russia. The St. George's Church is located in the Staraya Ladoga fortress, whereas a much bigger Assumption Cathedral is the katholikon of the Assumption Monastery. Both churches were constructed in the 12th century. Another monastery in Staraya Ladoga is the Saint Nicholas Monastery. Many of the old buildings in Staraya Ladoga, including the St. George's Cathedral, the fortress, and the wooden Church of Saint Dimitry, belong to the Staraya Ladoga Museum Reserve.

The Zelenets Trinity Monastery was founded in the 16th century, and most of its buildings form an architectural ensemble of the end of the 17th century.

Two more museums in the district are the Museum of History of the town of Volkhov and the Novaya Ladoga Town Museum.
