= Staraya Ladoga =

Selo in Leningrad Oblast, Russia

Staraya Ladoga Старая Ладога
- Selo
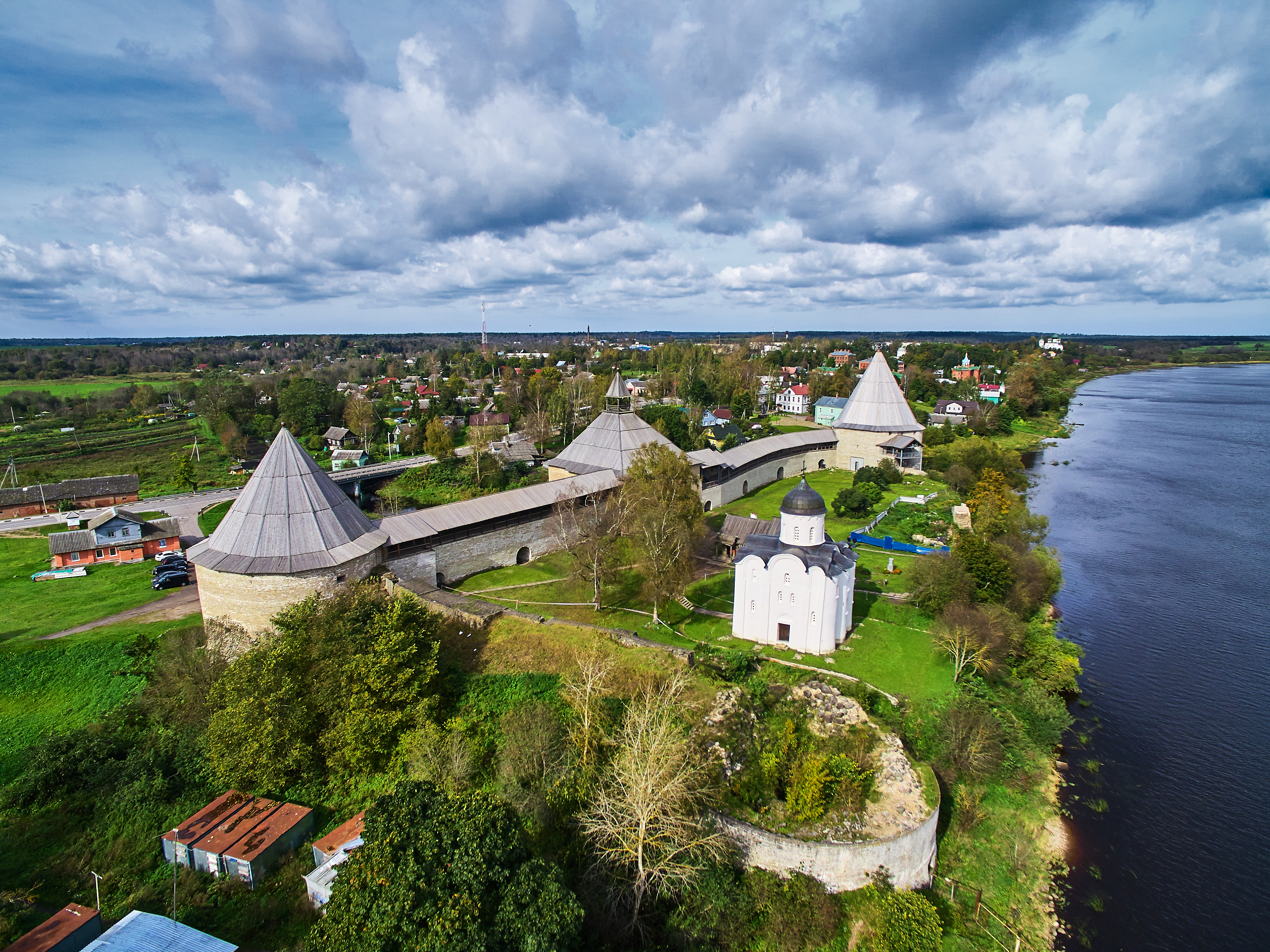

- Flag Coat of arms
- Interactive map of Staraya Ladoga
- Location of Staraya Ladoga Staraya Ladoga (European Russia) Staraya Ladoga (Europe)
- Coordinates: 59°59′50″N 32°17′53″E
- Country: Russia
- Federal subject: Leningrad Oblast
- Administrative district: Volkhovsky District
- Rural settlementSelsoviet: Staroladozhskoye Rural Settlement
- Founded: 753

Area
  - Total: 139 km^{2} (54 sq mi)

Population (2010 Census)
  - Total: 2,012
  - Estimate (2017): 1,954 (−2.9%)
  - Density: 14.5/km^{2} (37.5/sq mi)

Administrative status
  - Capital of: Staroladozhskoye Rural Settlement

Municipal status
  - Municipal district: Volkhovsky Municipal District
  - Rural settlement: Staroladozhskoye Rural Settlement
  - Capital of: Staroladozhskoye Rural Settlement
- Time zone: UTC+3 (MSK)
- Postal code: 187412
- Dialing code: +7 81363
- OKTMO ID: 41609462101

Staraya Ladoga (Russian: Старая Ладога, [ˈstarəjə ˈladəɡə], lit. 'Old Ladoga'), known as Ladoga until 1704, is a rural locality (a selo) in Volkhovsky District of Leningrad Oblast, Russia, located on the Volkhov River near Lake Ladoga, 8 kilometres (5.0 mi) north of the town of Volkhov, the administrative centre of the district.

It used to be a prosperous trading outpost in the 8th and 9th centuries. During this period, it was known to the Norse as Aldeigjuborg. It was dominated by Varangians who became known as the Rus'. For that reason, Staraya Ladoga is sometimes called the first capital of Russia; it is also regarded as one of the original centres from which the name Rus' spread to other territories inhabited by the East Slavs.

== Etymology ==
The settlement takes its name from a tributary of the Volkhov River, which itself is taken from the Finnish name Alodejoki ("low-lying river"), from alode ("low place") and joki ("river"). It was known to the Varangians as Aldegjuborg.

== History ==
=== Origin ===
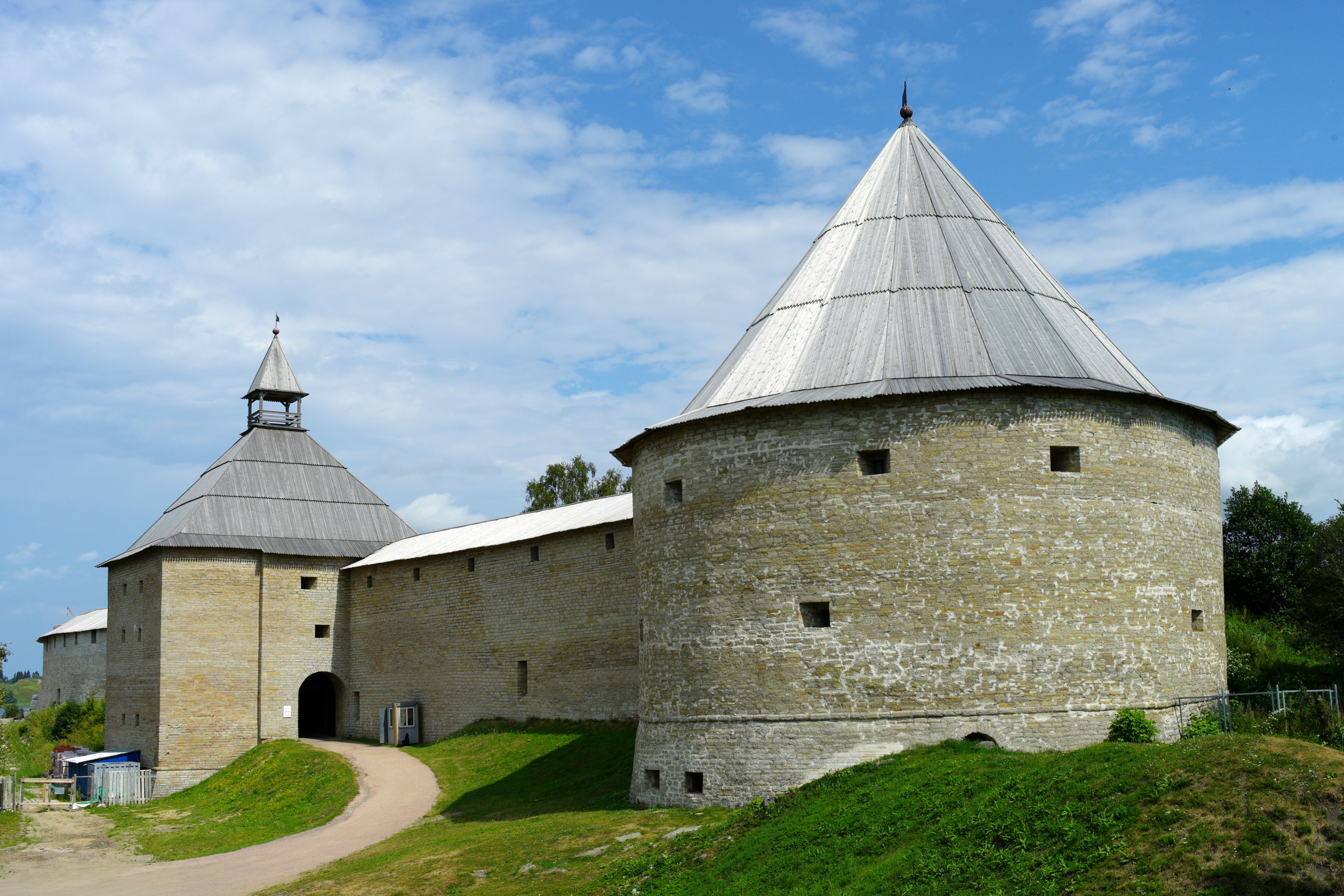
The fortress of Ladoga was built in the 12th century and rebuilt 400 years later. It is now mostly reconstructed since being heavily damaged during World War II.

A Scandinavian settlement was founded in the mid-8th century. Dendrochronology suggests that Ladoga was founded in 753. The Eastern Slavs became the dominant component of the population no later than the turn of the 760s and 770s. From the late 8th to the early 9th century, it served as an important stronghold on the trade route to the Byzantine Empire. Around the 830s or 840s, it was captured by a group of Varangians, who established the Varangian Street on the left bank of the river.

Until the mid-10th century, it was one of the most important trading ports of Eastern Europe. Ladoga controlled access to the Volkhov River, which was one of the most important routes between the Baltic Sea and the Russian interior. Merchant vessels sailed from the Baltic Sea through Ladoga to Novgorod and then to Constantinople or the Caspian Sea. This route is known as the trade route from the Varangians to the Greeks. An alternative route followed the Volga River along the Volga trade route to the Khazar capital of Atil, and then to the southern shores of the Caspian Sea and onward to Baghdad. Significantly, the oldest dirhams in European Russia were unearthed in Ladoga. The earliest coins are dated to 786–787. It is possible that the original Scandinavian inhabitants lived there seasonally, but as Ladoga grew, most, if not all, of its Scandinavian inhabitants became permanent residents. Ladoga, along with Ryurikovo Gorodishche, Sarskoye Gorodishche, Gnezdovo, and other bases, played an essential role in making Scandinavian trade with the Islamic world profitable.

=== Early history ===
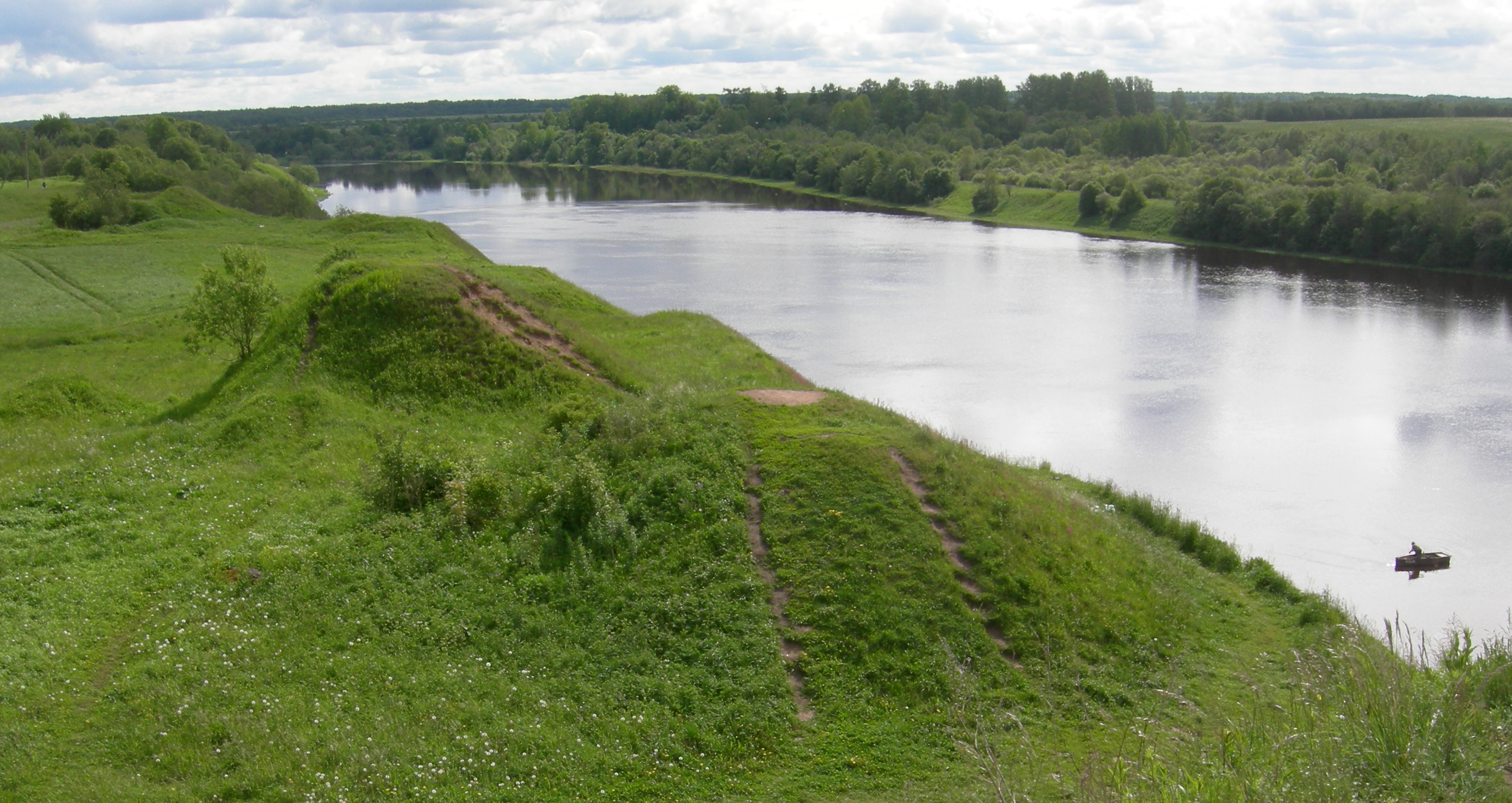
8th-to-10th-century Viking burial mounds along the Volkhov River near Staraya Ladoga

According to the version of the Primary Chronicle found in the Hypatian Codex, the Varangian leader Rurik arrived at Ladoga in 862 and made it his seat of power in northern Russia. It was devastated around 865. Rurik later moved to Novgorod, from where his successors subsequently moved to Kiev, where the foundations for the powerful state of Kievan Rus' were laid. These Varangians, known as the Rus', gave their name to the land and, ultimately, to Russia. The new state was known to them as Garðaríki. The growth in commerce led to the construction of new buildings around 894. Ladoga therefore served as a base and warehouse for a merchant association. From the mid-10th century, Ladoga was a settlement with a Varangian presence until the 11th century. The Novgorod First Chronicle says that Prince Oleg was buried in Ladoga.

There are several large tumuli, or royal funerary barrows, on the outskirts of Ladoga. One of them is said to be Rurik's grave and another that of his successor, Oleg. The Heimskringla and other Norse sources mention that in 997, the Norwegian earl Eric Haakonsson raided the coast and set the town ablaze. Ladoga is also mentioned as Aldeigja in the poem Bandadrápa by Eyjólfr dáðaskáld and as Aldeigjuborg in Scandinavian sources.

Ladoga is mentioned in 1019 as a central possession of Ingegerd Olofsdotter of Sweden, who married Yaroslav of Novgorod. Under the terms of their marriage settlement, Yaroslav ceded Ladoga to his wife, who appointed her father's cousin, the Swedish earl Ragnvald Ulfsson, to rule the town. This information is confirmed by sagas and archaeological evidence, which suggests that Ladoga gradually evolved into a primarily Varangian settlement. At least two Swedish kings spent their youth in Ladoga: Stenkil and Inge the Elder; possibly, Anund from Russia also did so. Archaeologists have found several Scandinavian Christian graves in Ladoga dating to the 11th century, possibly belonging to Swedish soldiers serving Ragnvald.

From 1136 onward, Ladoga functioned as a trading outpost of the powerful Novgorod Republic. It was the most important prigorod (suburb) of Novgorod from the 13th century onward. As the oldest town in the region, it was viewed as a defender of Russian lands against the Swedes. However, its trade significance declined and most of the population engaged in fishing in the 15th century. Ladoga was repeatedly targeted by Swedish forces, who captured and burned it in 1313. In 1338, the fortress survived a siege, but the posad was destroyed. After new fortresses such as Oreshek and Korela were constructed farther west of Ladoga in the 14th century, the town's military significance also decreased, and by the end of the 15th century, it had lost all of its importance. Ladoga belonged to Vodskaya pyatina of the Novgorod Republic and contained eighty-four homesteads in the 15th century; most of the land belonged to the Russian Orthodox Church. The Novgorodians built there a citadel with five towers and several churches.

From the late 15th century onward, it was a border town of the centralized Russian state. Because of a shortage of available land in Ladoga, the Muscovite authorities were compelled to take measures to ensure that citizens could acquire land. The fortress was rebuilt in the 1580s, and new towers were erected. In 1610, during the Time of Troubles, it was captured by Swedish troops but retaken by the Russians in February 1611. Negotiations between Russia and Sweden took place in Ladoga in 1616, which led to the conclusion of the Treaty of Stolbovo in 1617 and the end of the Russo-Swedish War of 1610–1617.

=== Later history ===
After the town of Novaya Ladoga (New Ladoga) was founded in 1704 by Peter the Great, Ladoga became known as Staraya Ladoga (Old Ladoga) and its importance decreased. The town was converted into a prigorod (suburb). Since 1764, it has had the status of a village (selo).

== Sights and landmarks ==
The heart of Staraya Ladoga is an old fortress where the Ladozhka flows into the Volkhov. In earlier times, it was a strategic site because it was the only possible harbor for sea-vessels that could not navigate through the Volkhov River. The fortress was rebuilt at the turn of the 15th and 16th centuries. In 1703, Peter the Great founded the town of Novaya Ladoga (New Ladoga) closer to the bank of Lake Ladoga. The ancient fortress thenceforth declined and came to be known as Staraya Ladoga (Old Ladoga), in order to distinguish it from the new town. The reconstruction of one of the towers of Staraya Ladoga's fortress was scheduled to be completed in 2010.

Ladoga Fortress

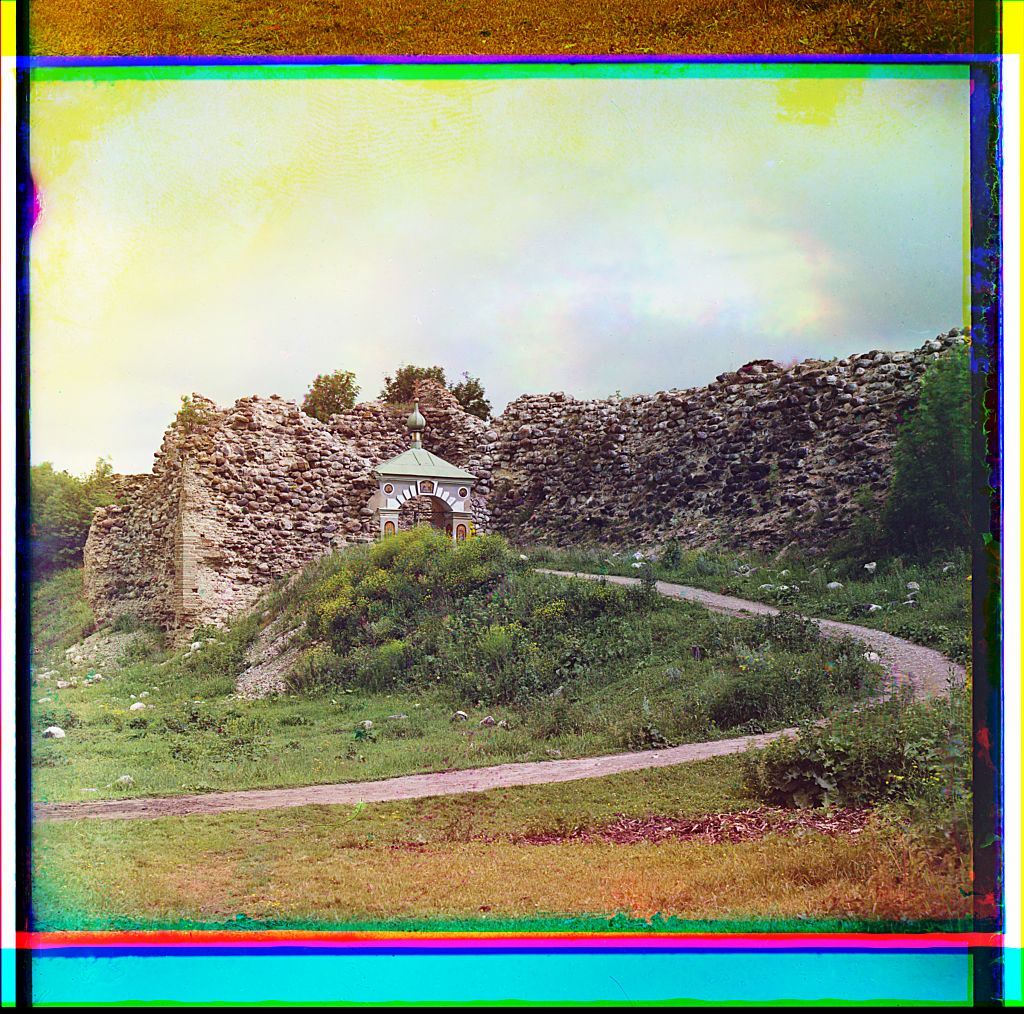
Ladoga Fortress 1909 by Sergey Prokudin-Gorsky

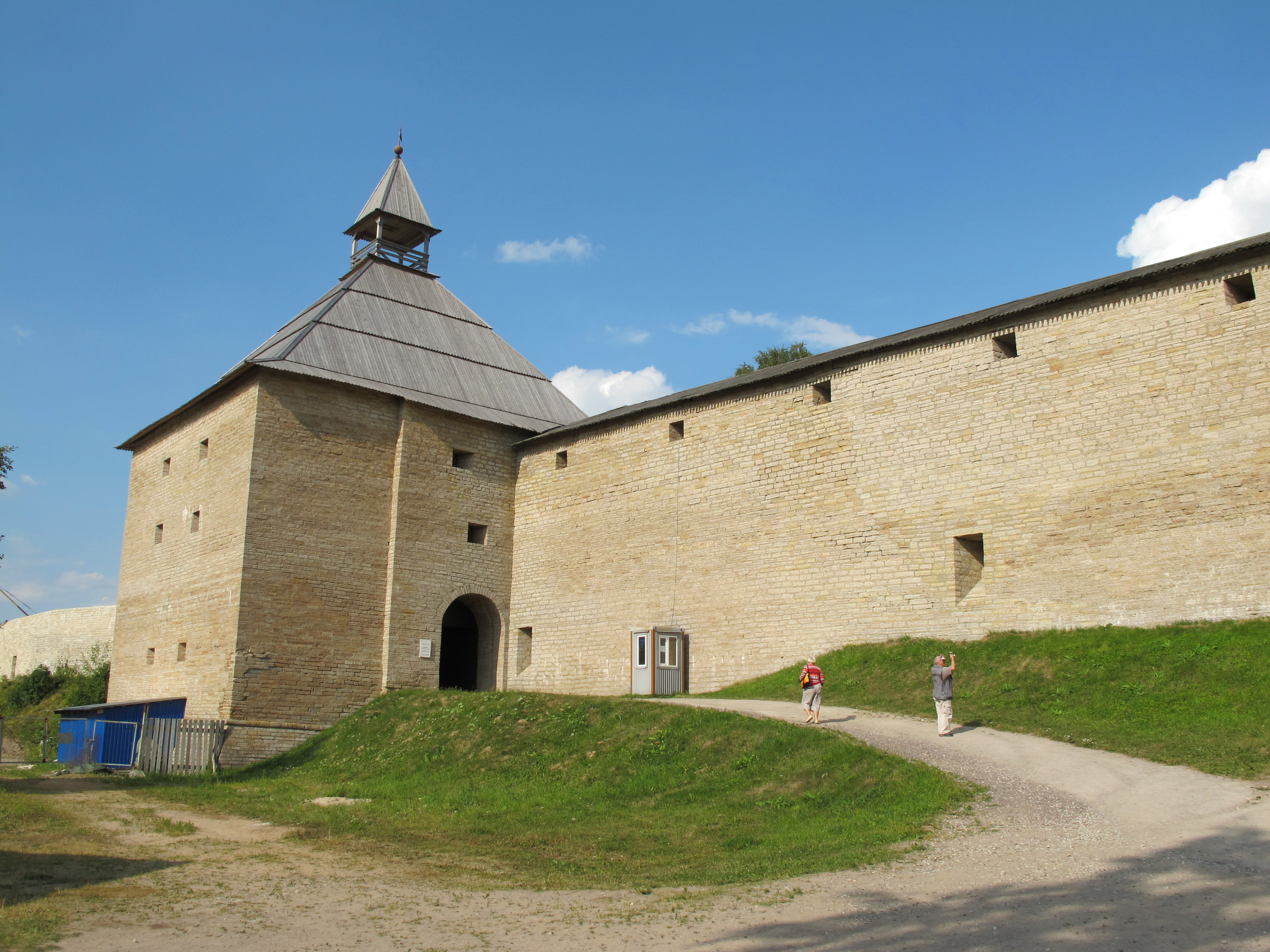
Ladoga Fortress 2013

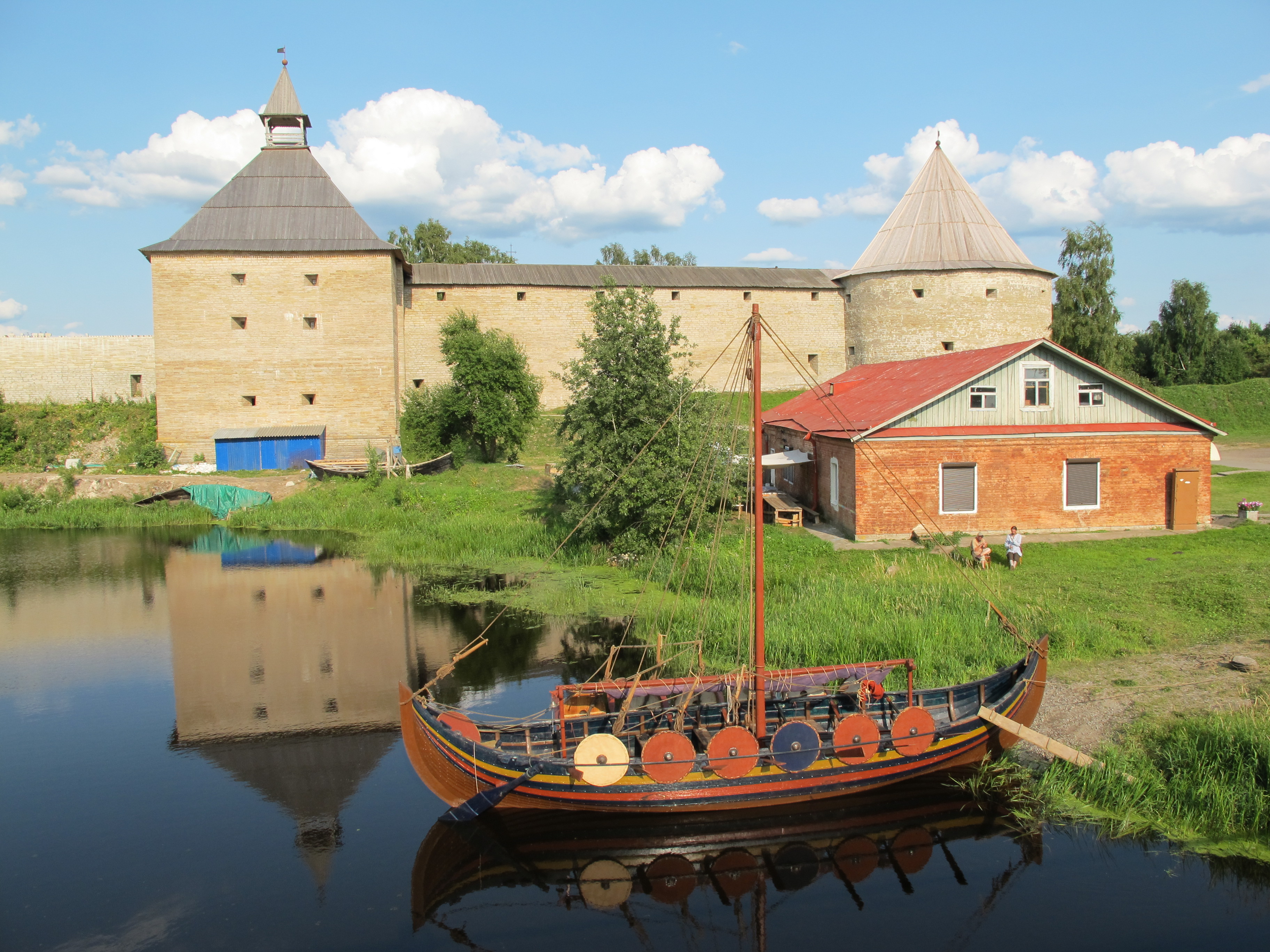
Ladoga Fortress 2013

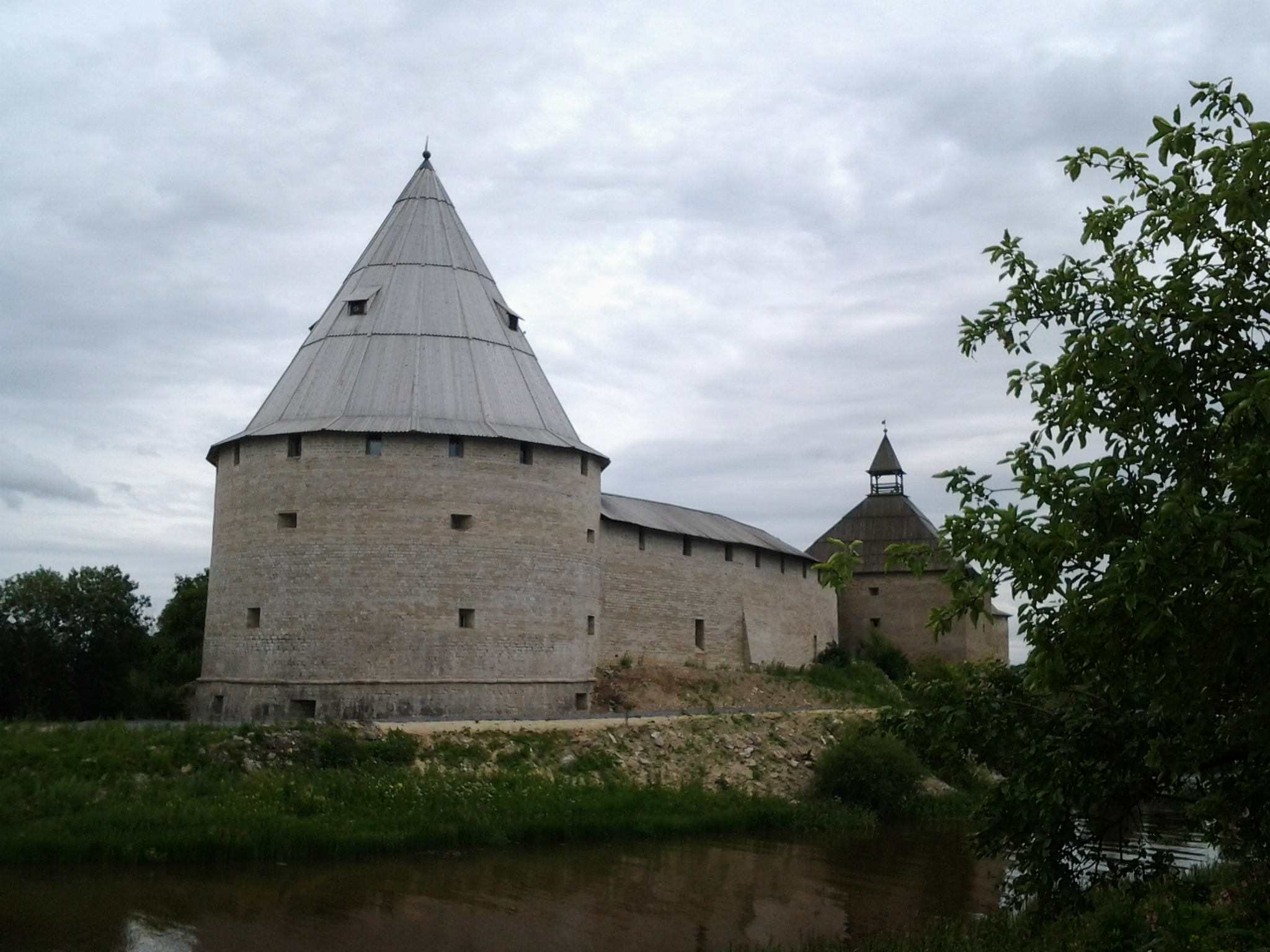
Ladoga Fortress 2017

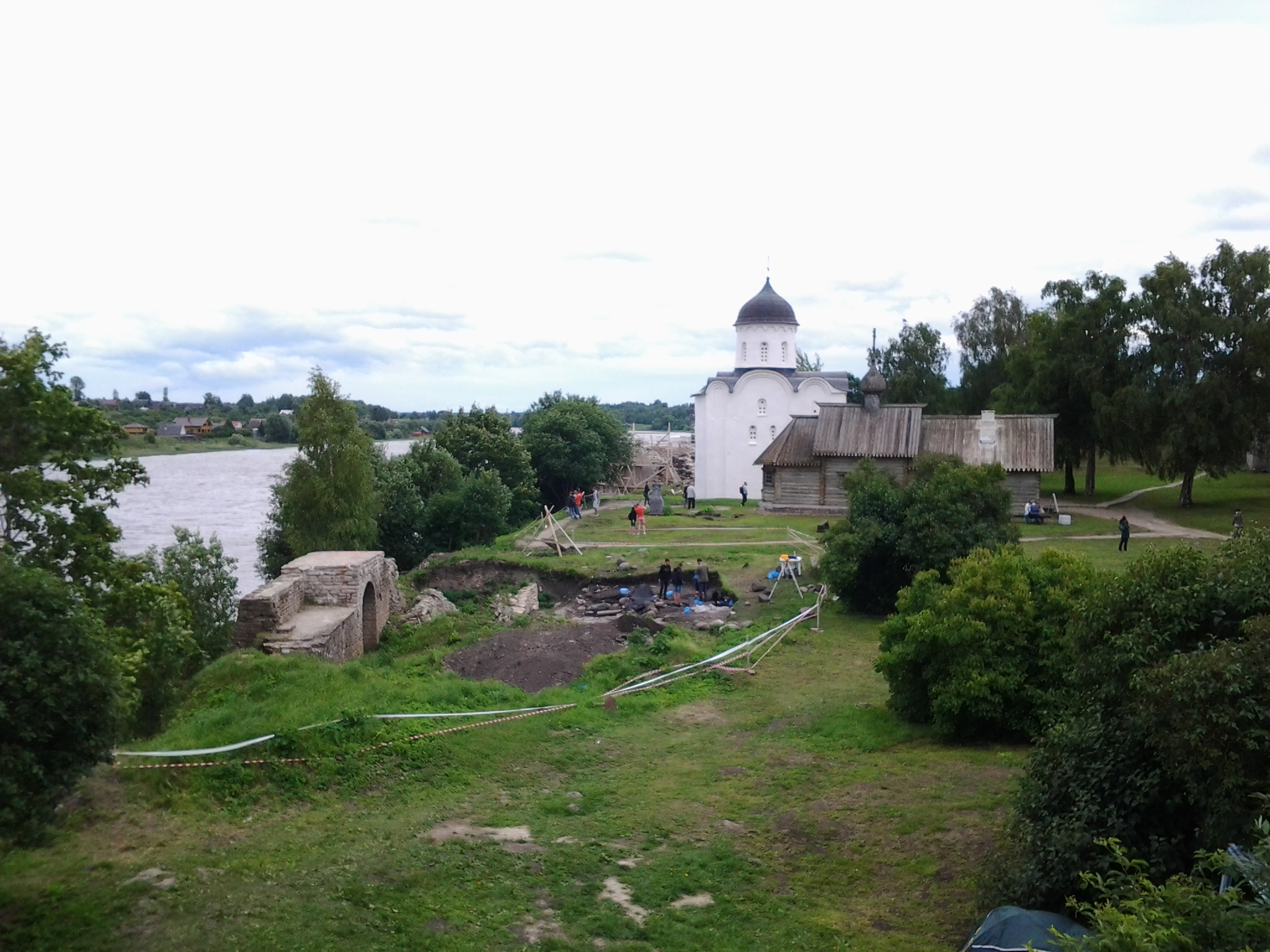
Ladoga Fortress 2017

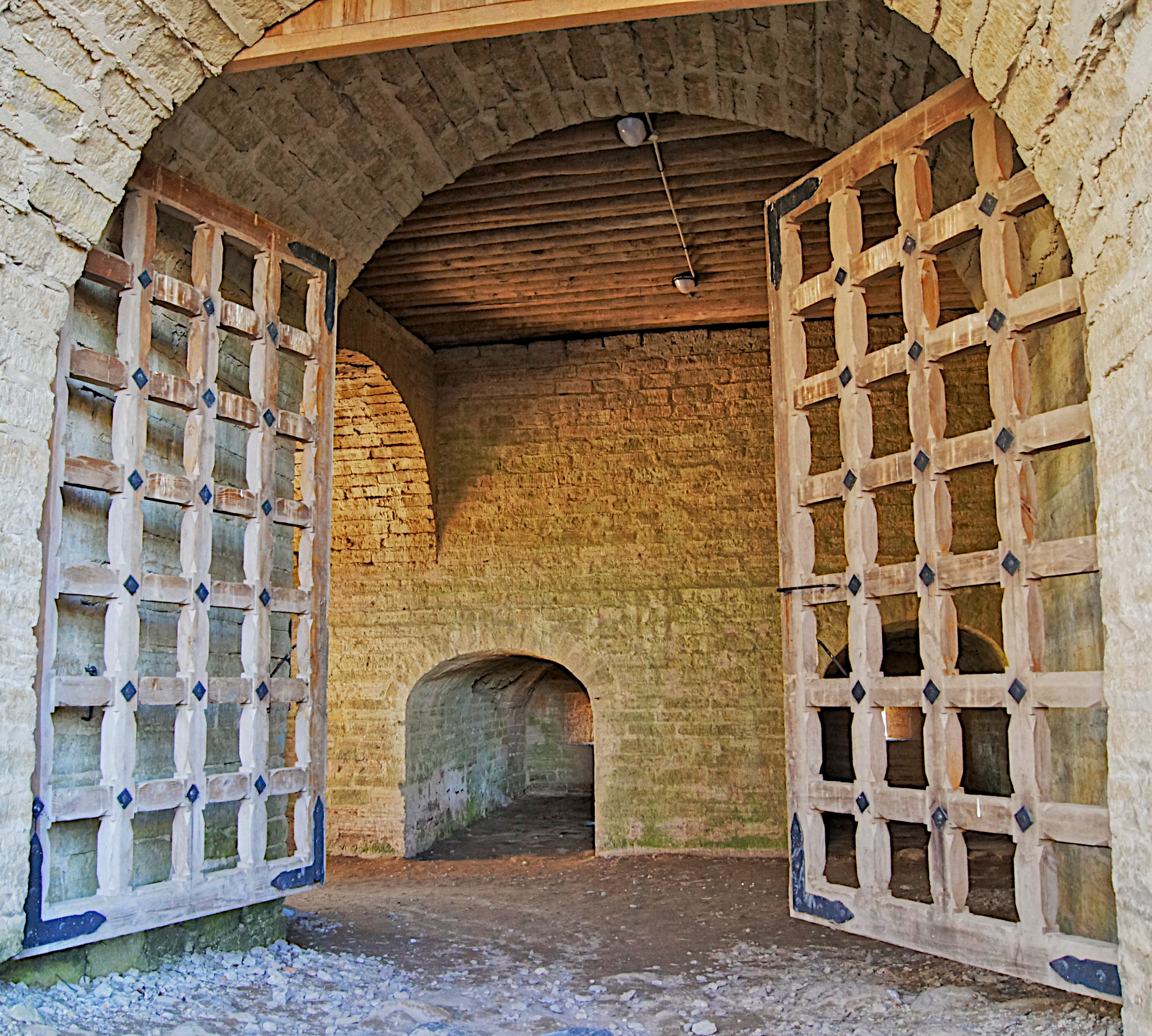
Ladoga Fortress main gate

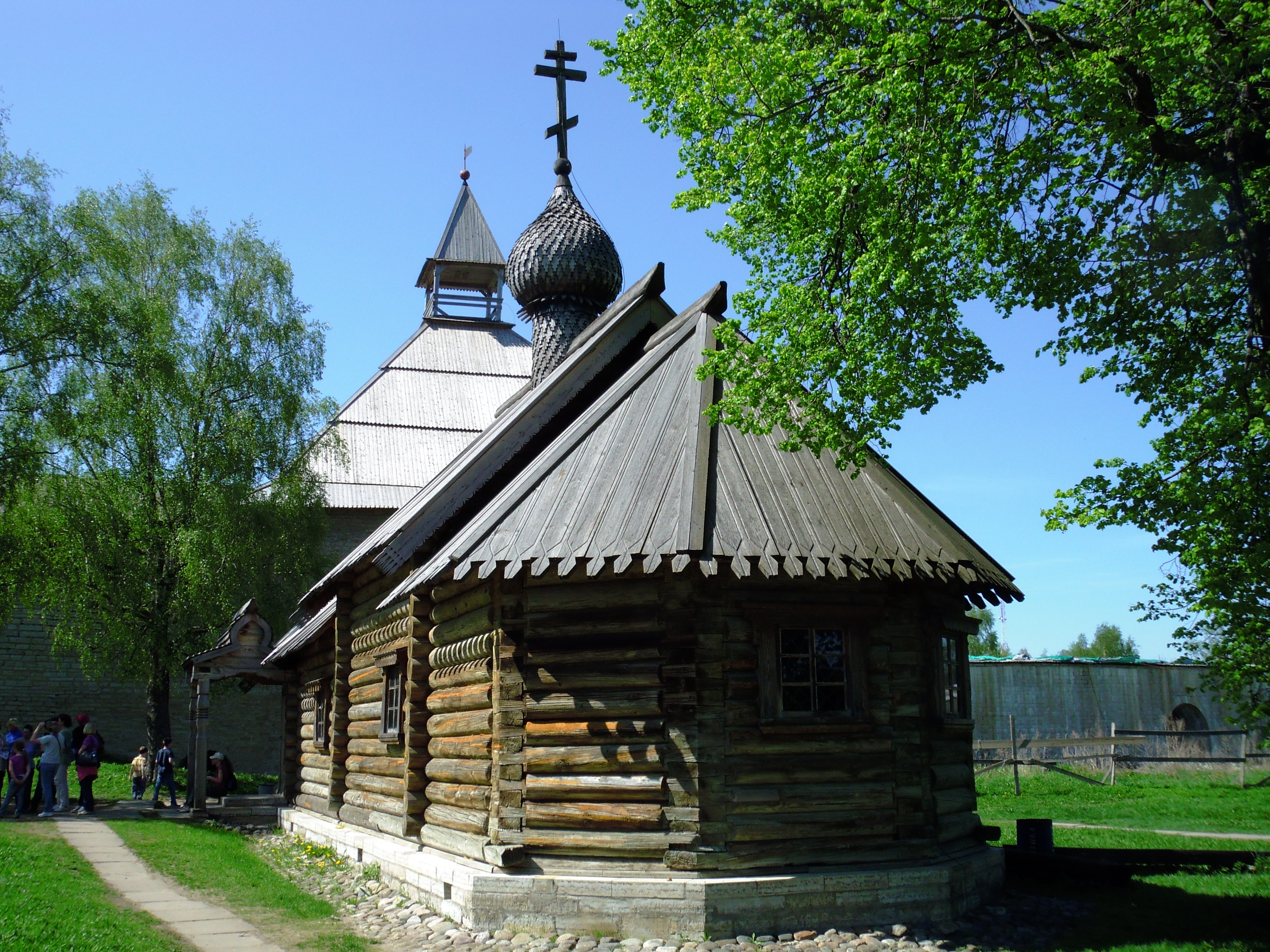
Ladoga Fortress wooden chapel

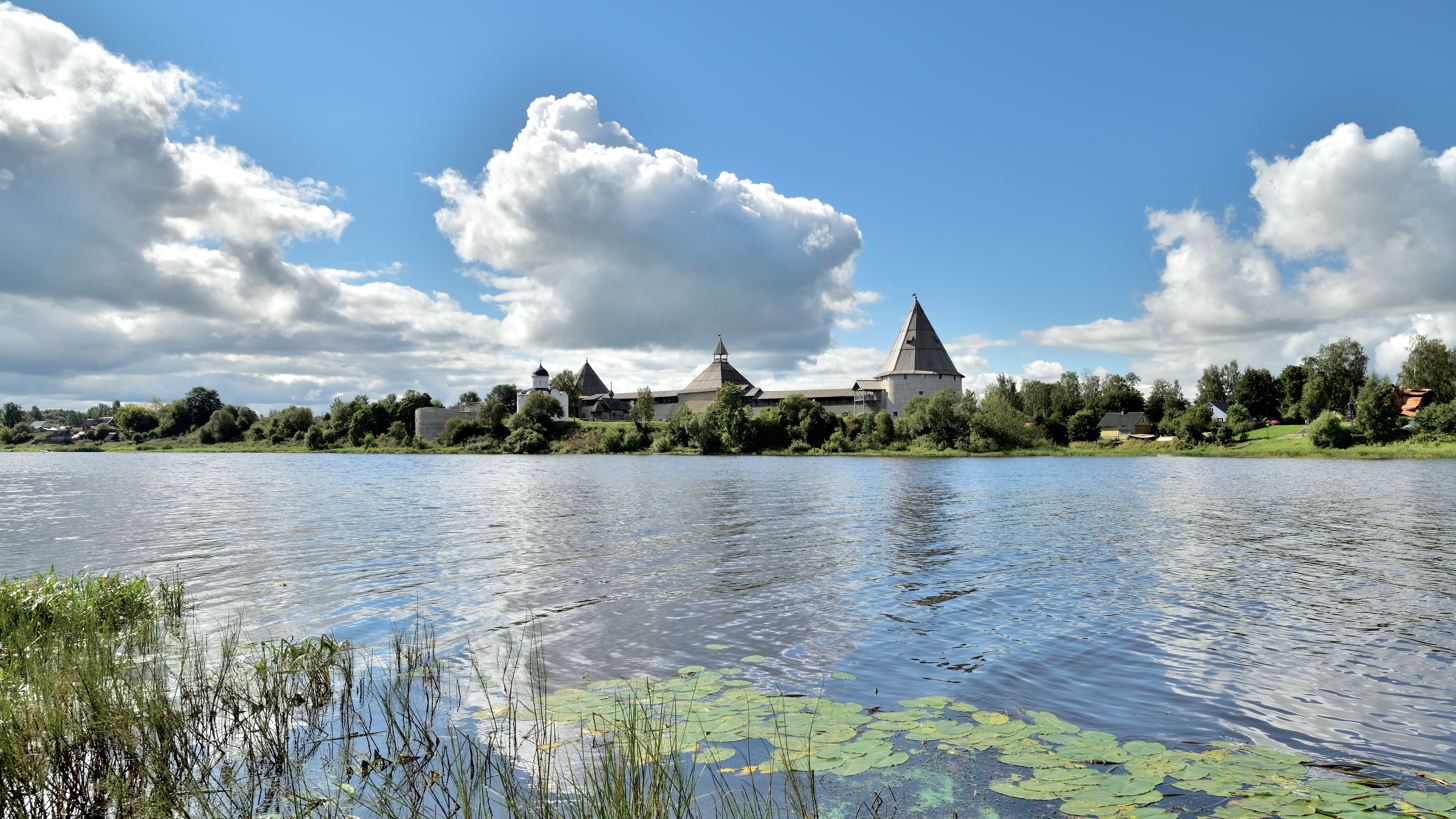
Panorama of the Ladoga Fortress from the eastern bank of the Volkhov River

The mid-12th-century churches of St. George and of Mary's Assumption stand in all their original glory. Inside St. George's, some magnificent 12th-century frescoes are still visible. In addition, there is a mid-12th-century church of St. Climent, which stands in ruins.

Landmark churches in Staraya Ladoga

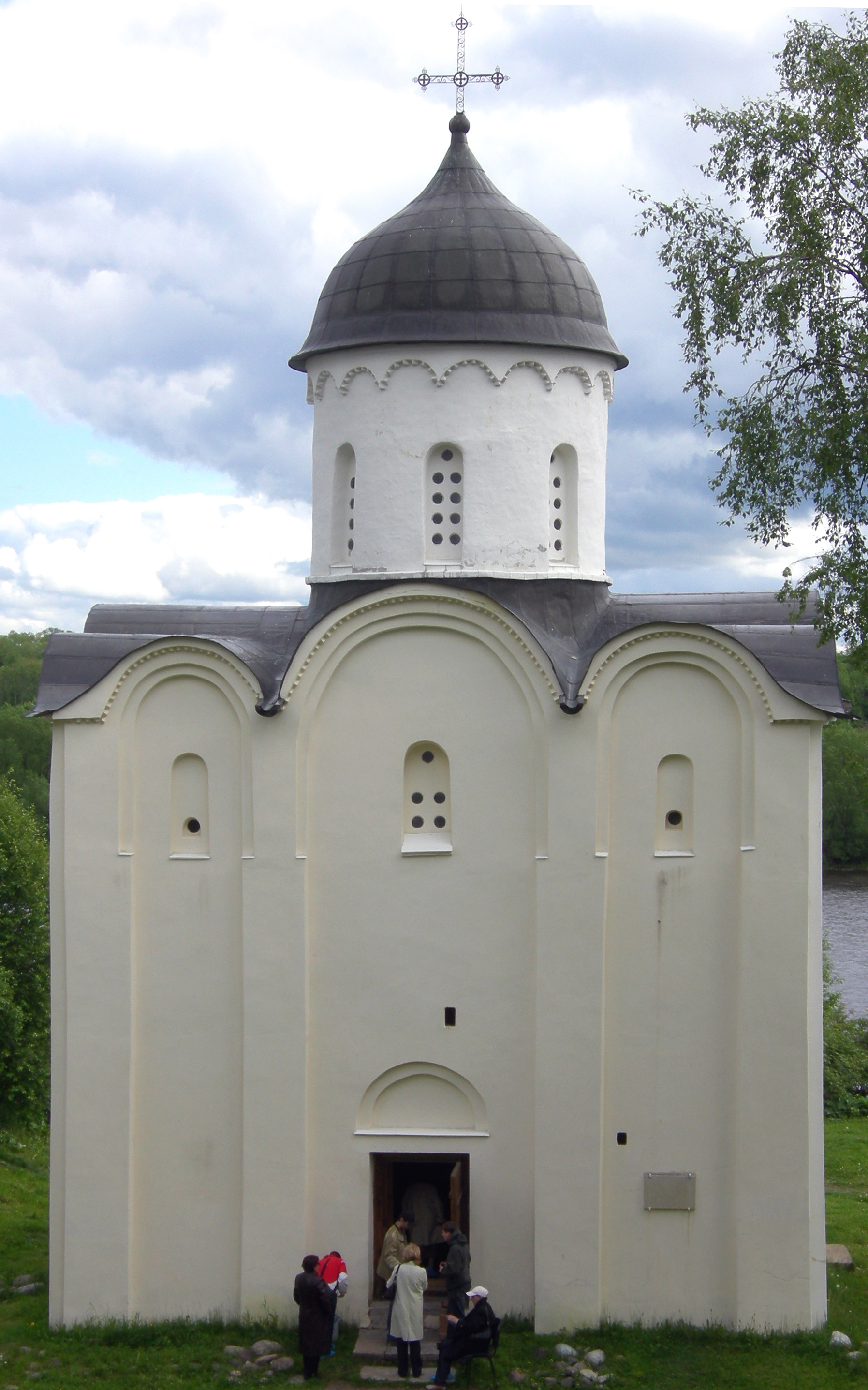
St. George's Church in the Ladoga Fortress.

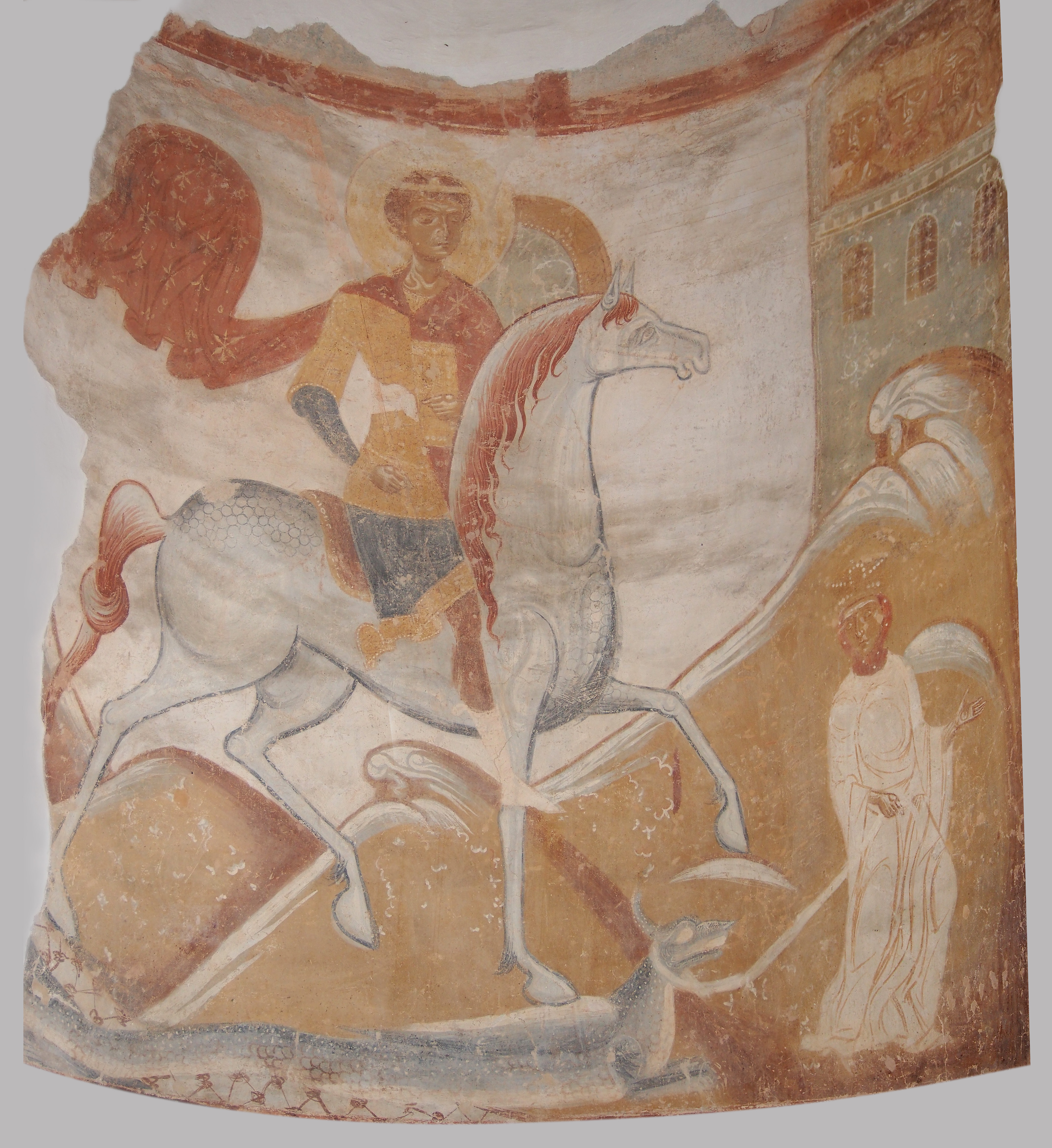
St. George's Church contains frescoes painted in 1167.

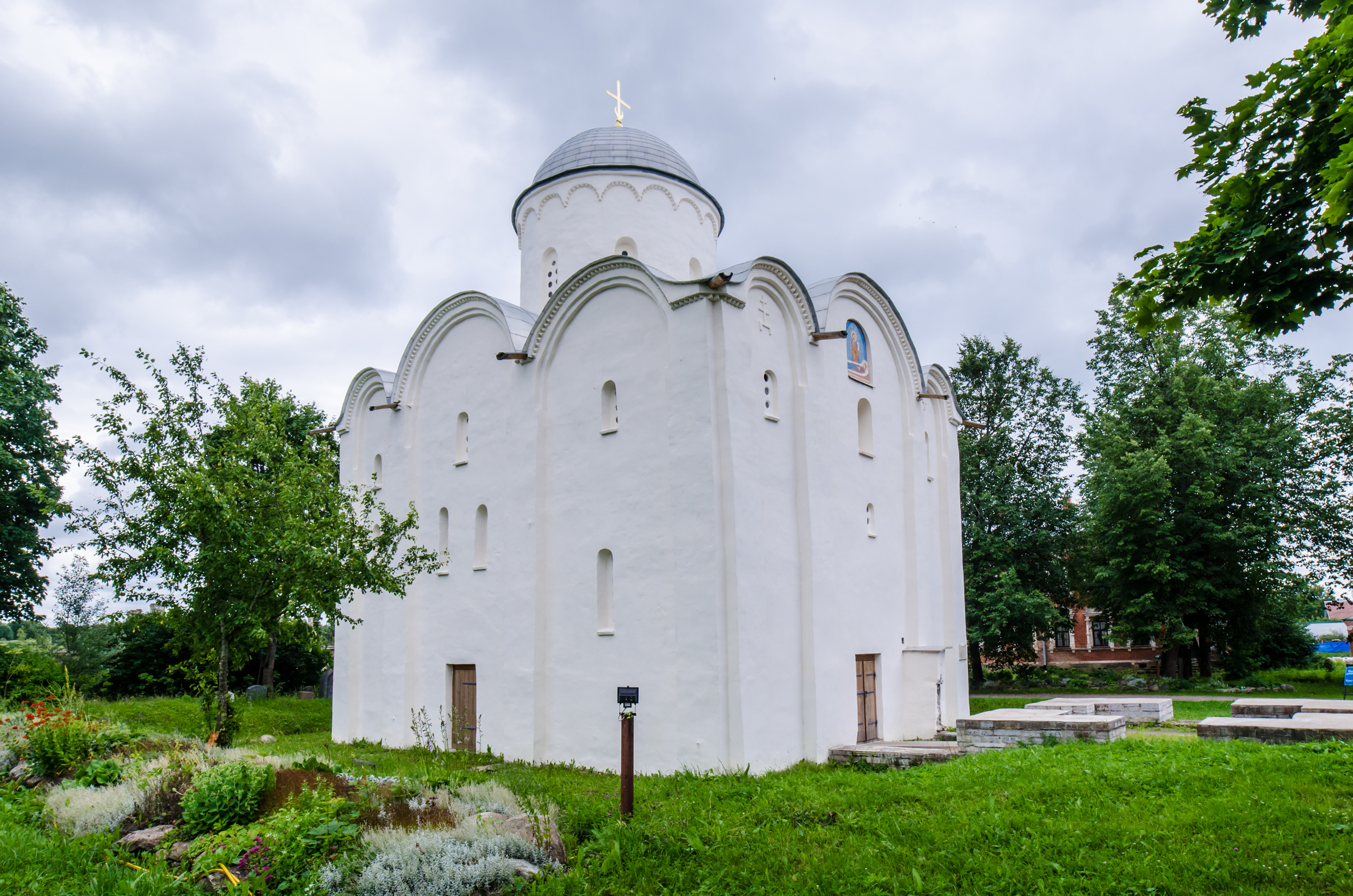
The Assumption Cathedral in the Assumption Convent

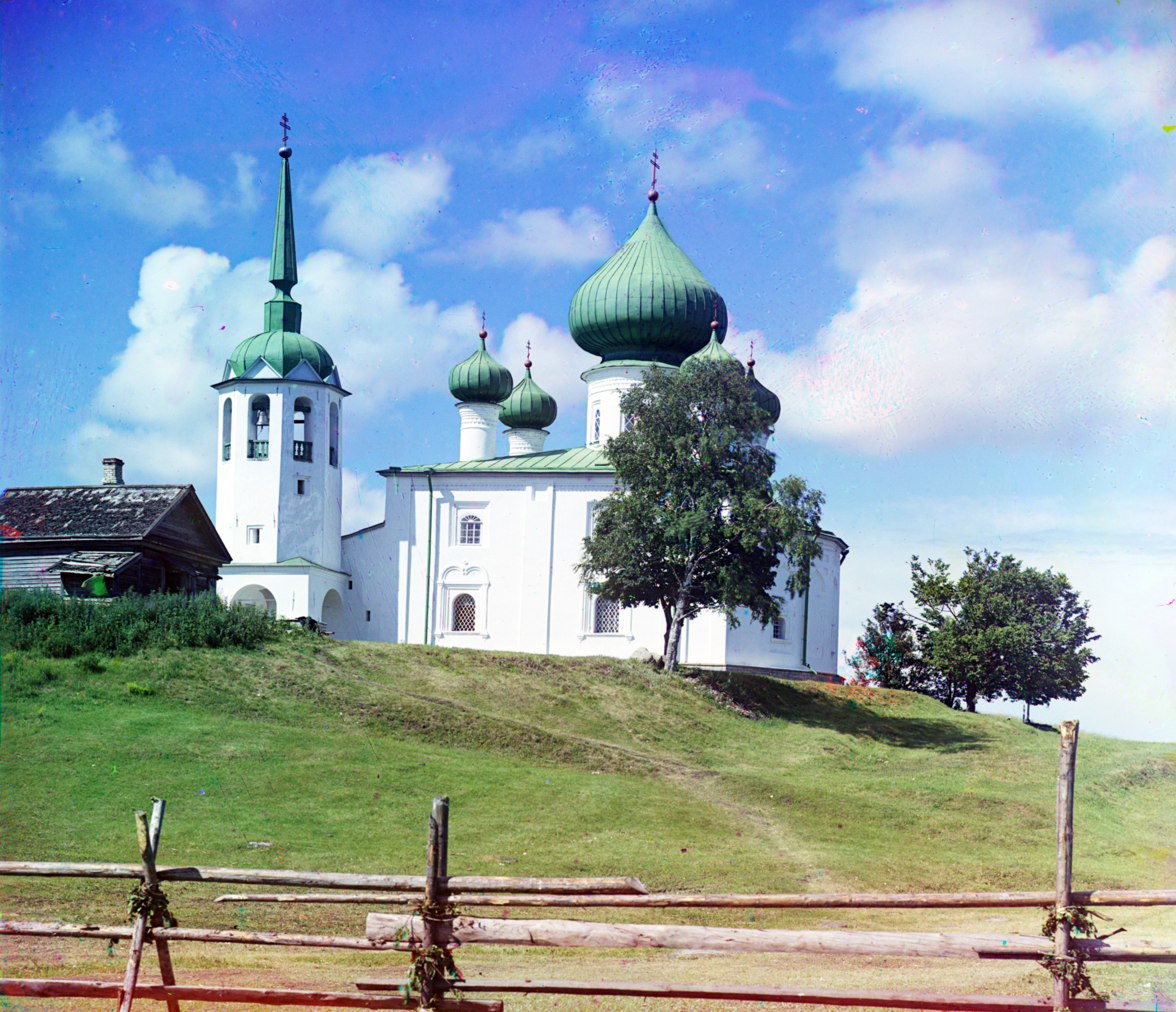
Church of St. John the Baptist on Malyshevaya Hill 1909 by Sergey Prokudin-Gorsky

There is also the Assumption Convent, and a monastery, dedicated to St. Nicholas, which was rebuilt in the 17th century. The Assumption Cathedral, built and consecrated in 1116, is located within the convent.

Monasteries in Staraya Ladoga

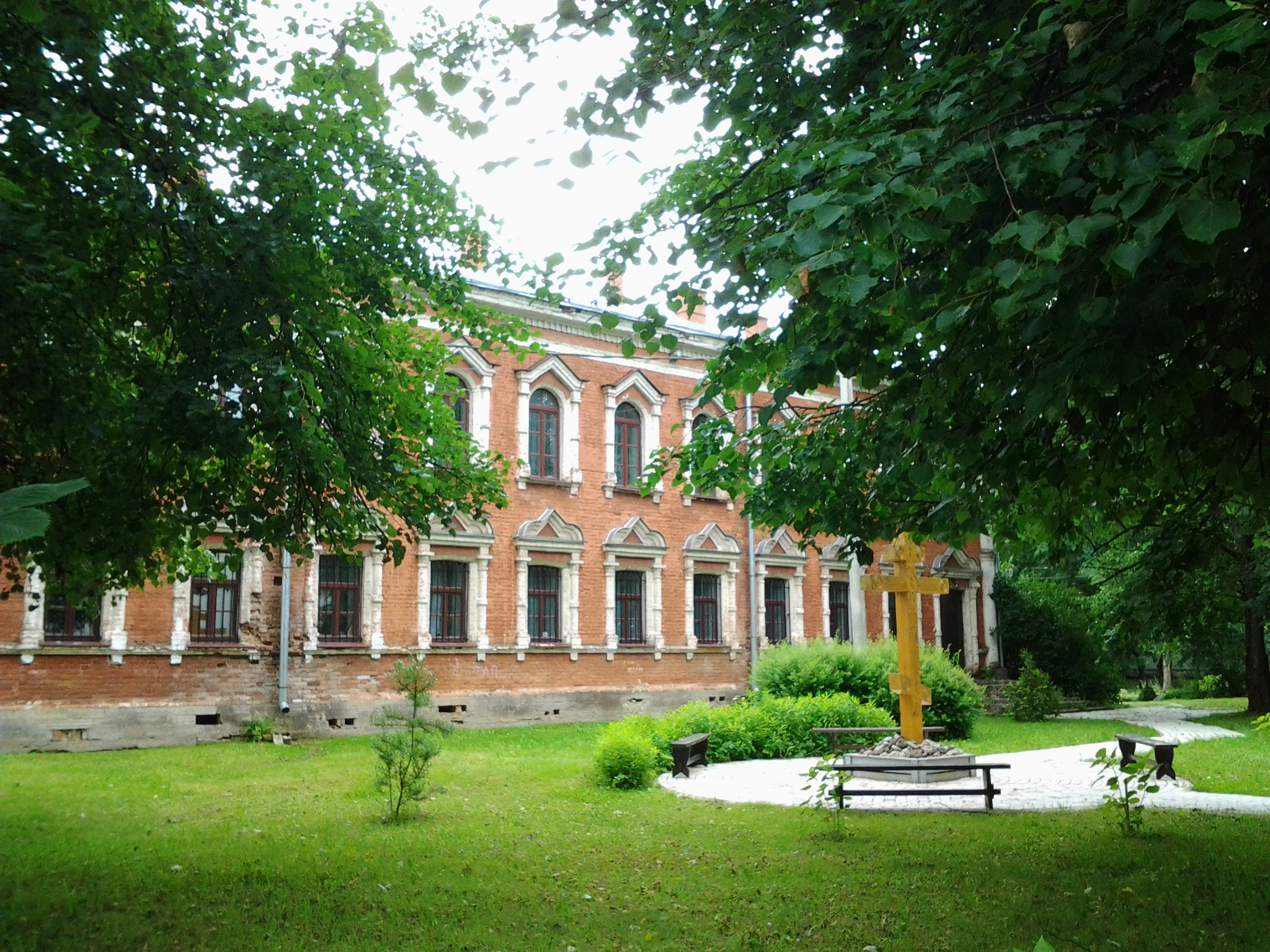
The Assumption Convent

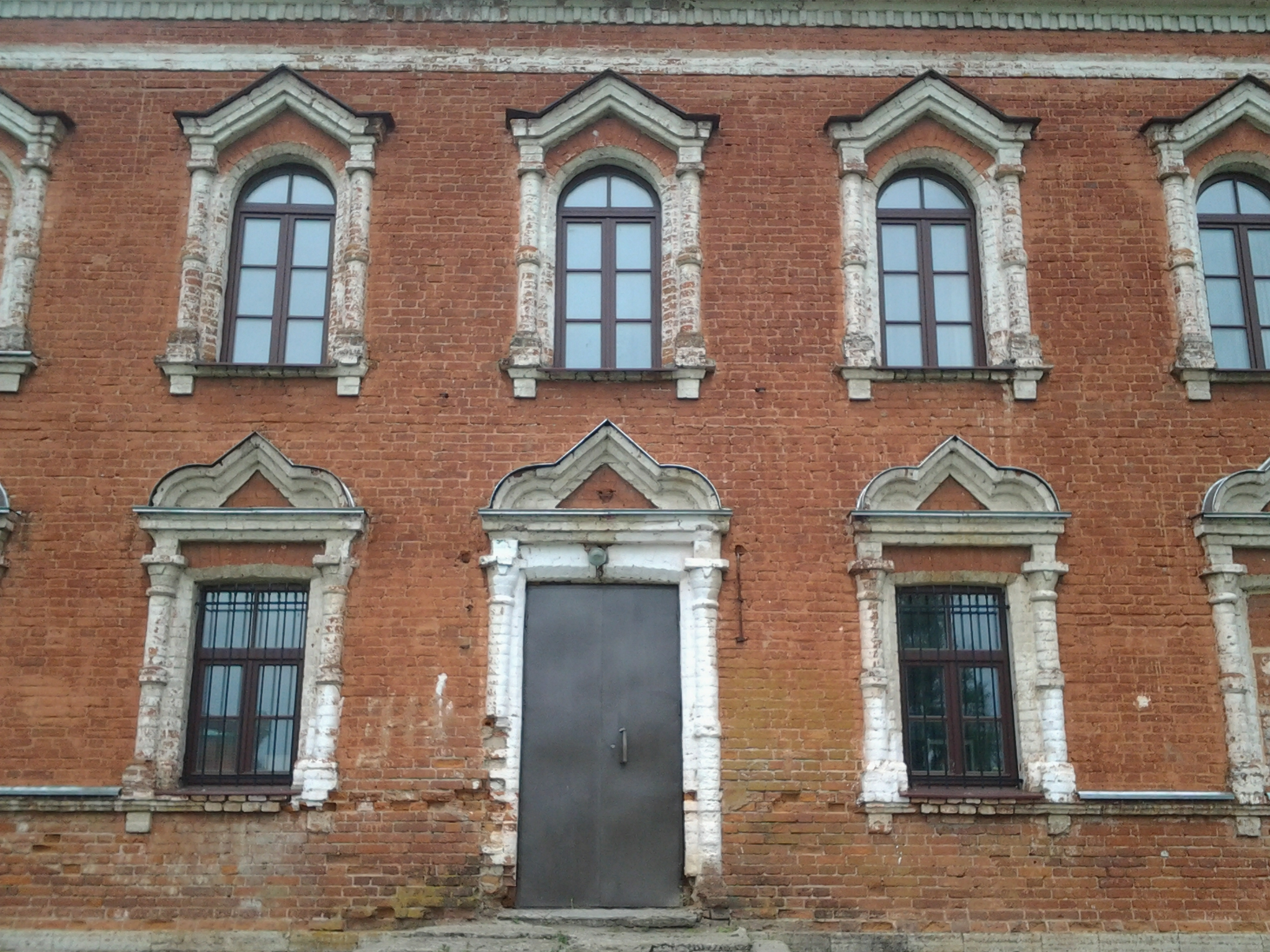
The Assumption Convent

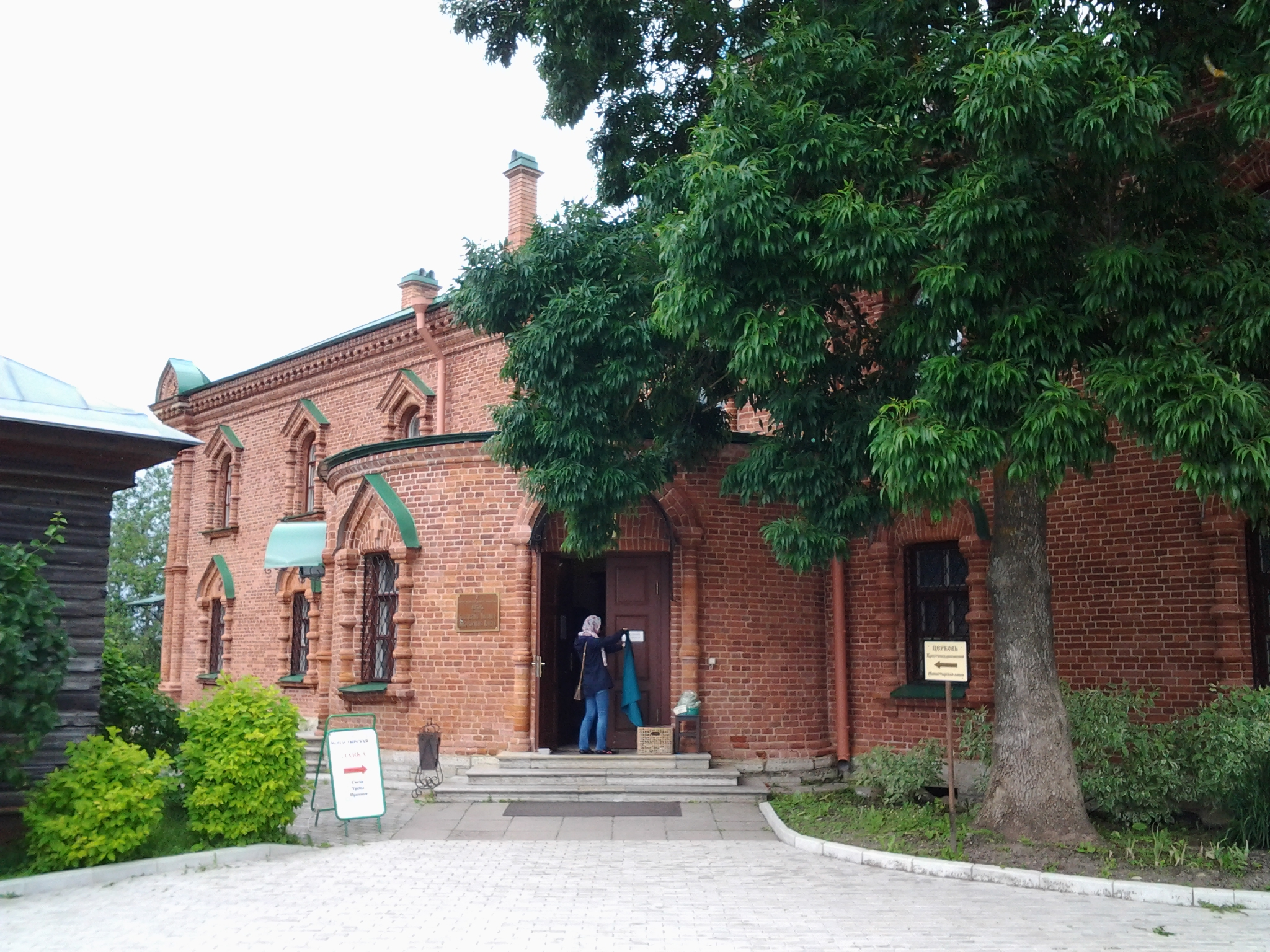
The Assumption Convent

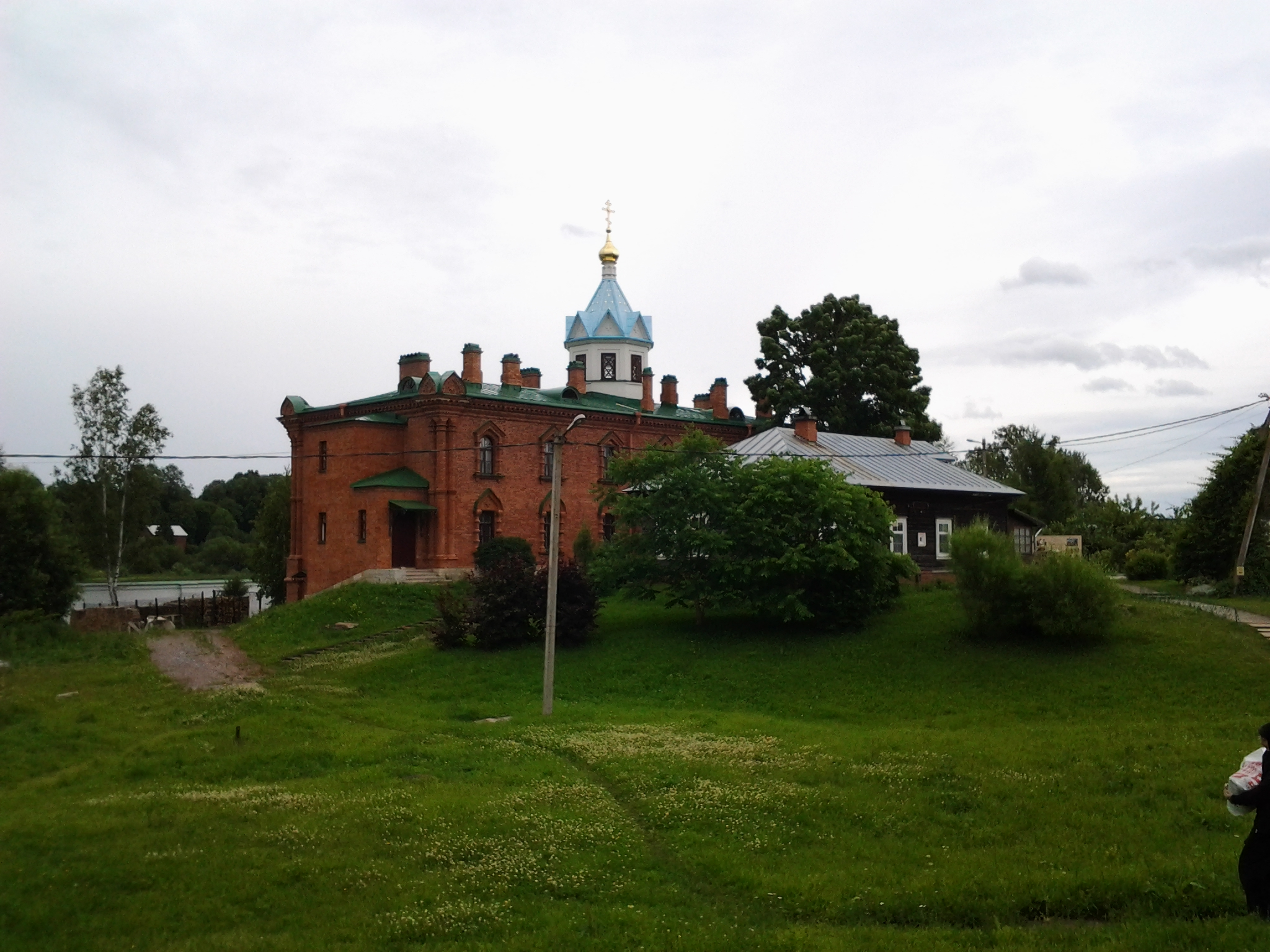
The Assumption Convent

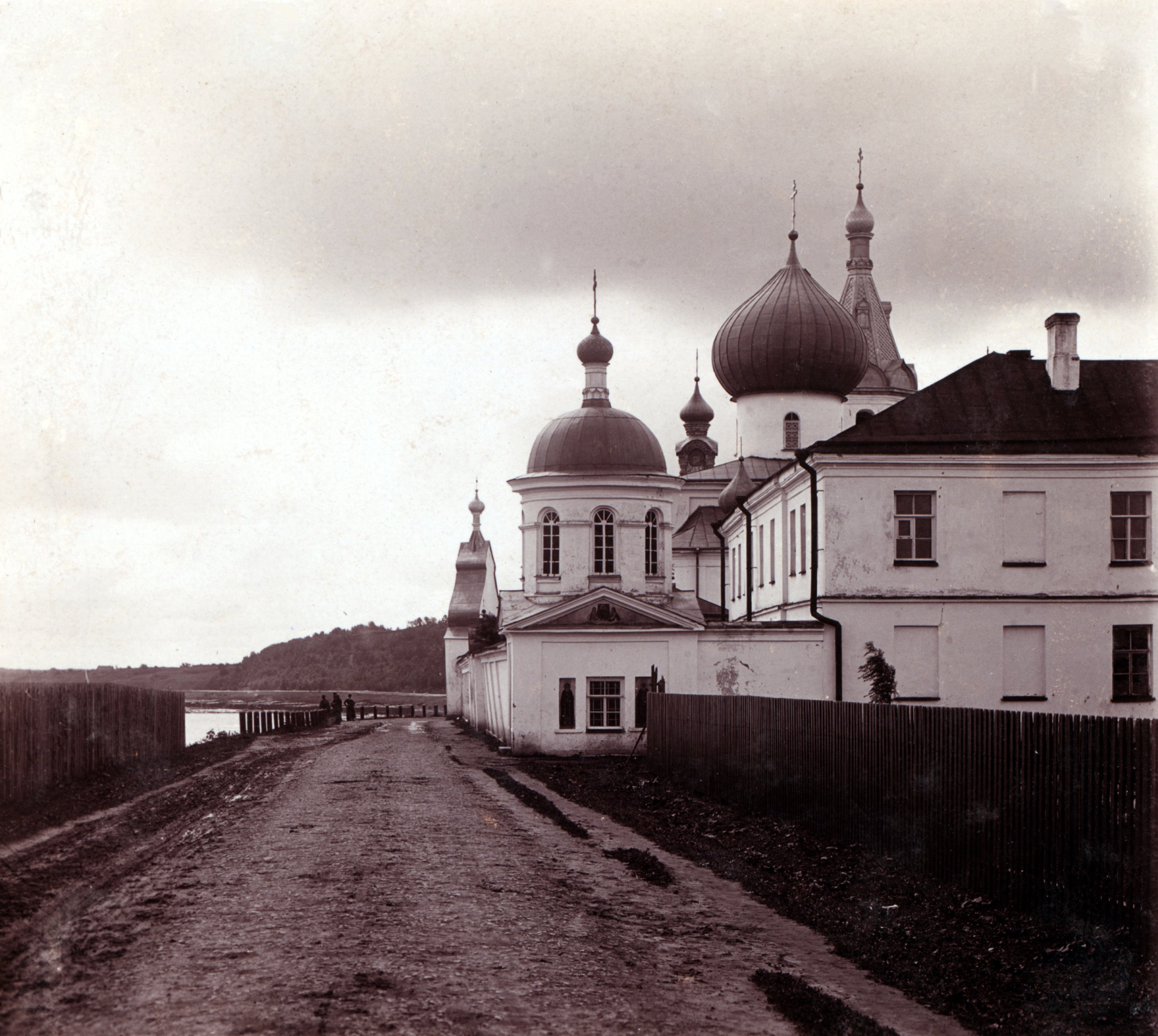
The St Nicholas Monastery 1909 by Sergey Prokudin-Gorsky

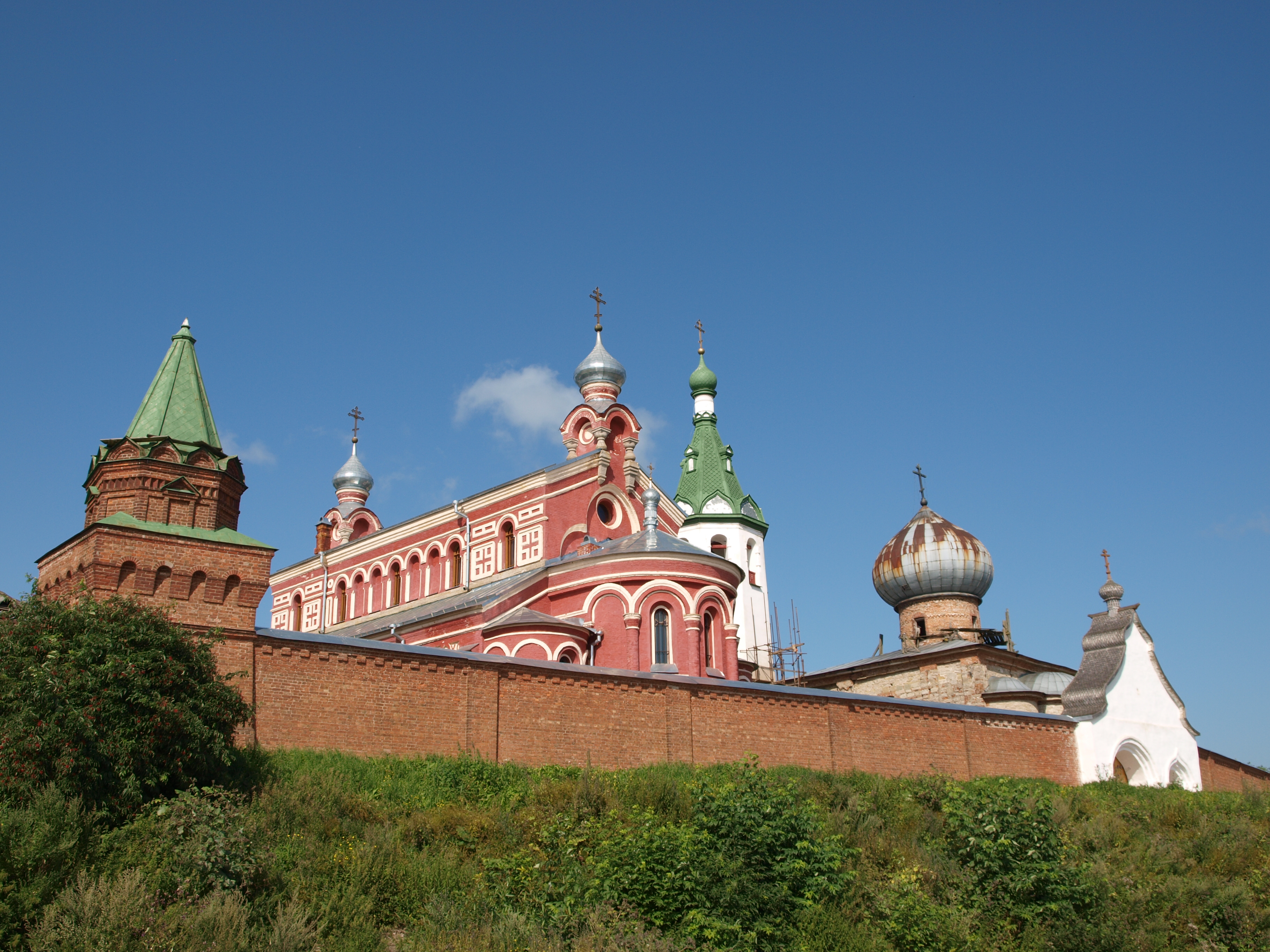
The St Nicholas Monastery 2011

== Culture and art ==
Staraya Ladoga's barrows, architectural monuments, and romantic views of the Volkhov River have always drawn the attention of Russian painters. There were the artists Ivan Aivazovsky, Orest Kiprensky, Aleksander Orłowski, Ivan Ivanov, Alexey Venetsianov and many others in the 19th century. A future member of the Imperial Academy of Arts and the Peredvizhniki group Vassily Maximov was born and laid to rest there. He portrayed scenes from an everyday life of peasants.

Nicholas Roerich painted his studies there during the summer of 1899. He named this landscape the best of his Russian ones. Valentin Serov, Konstantin Korovin, and Boris Kustodiev also worked there. Alexander Samokhvalov visited Staraya Ladoga many times from 1924 to 1926. He took part in the restoration of St. George's Church. According to him, that experience helped him understand the effect of combining monumental painting with architectural forms. As a result, he painted "Staraya Ladoga" (1924) and "Family of Fisherman" (1926, Russian Museum).

In February 1945, the former estate of the prince Shakhovskoy was given to artists from Leningrad as a retreat and workspace. Rstoration work continued for 15 years from 1946. Artists began arriving at Staraya Ladoga in the 1940s and it became a source of inspiration for Sergei Osipov, Gleb Savinov, Nikolai Timkov, Arseny Semionov, and many others over the following decades.

The House of Creativity began to operate permanently at the beginning of the 1960s after restoration work was completed. It was an important centre of Russian art life for the next 30 years. Artists such as Evsey Moiseenko, Alexander Samokhvalov, Vecheslav Zagonek, Dmitry Belyaev, Vladimir Ovchinnikov, Boris Ugarov, Boris Shamanov, Vsevolod Bazhenov, Piotr Buchkin, Zlata Bizova, Taisia Afonina, Marina Kozlovskaya, Dmitry Maevsky, Alexander Semionov, Arseny Semionov, Irina Dobrekova, Vladimir Sakson, Gleb Savinov, Elena Zhukova, Sergei Zakharov, Ivan Varichev, Veniamin Borisov, Valery Vatenin, Ivan Godlevsky, Vladimir Krantz, Lazar Yazgur, Irina Dobrekova, Pyotr Fomin, and many other painters and graphic artists worked there.

From 1970 to 1980, as the House of Creativity was expanding, new buildings were constructed and used year-round. All expenses for housing, food and travel were covered by the Art Foundation of the Russian Soviet Federative Socialist Republic. The paintings created there were exhibited in first-rate art exhibitions. They enriched the collections of major museums in the Soviet Union and as well as numerous private collections in Russia and abroad. The works also formed an important part of the collection of the Staraya Ladoga museum.

The House of Creativity lost its funding in the early 1990s as a result of the dissolution of the Soviet Union and the liquidation of the Art Foundation, and was subsequently closed.
