= 2025 Leningrad Oblast gubernatorial election =

- 12–14 September 2025
- Turnout: 62.79% ▲11.32 pp
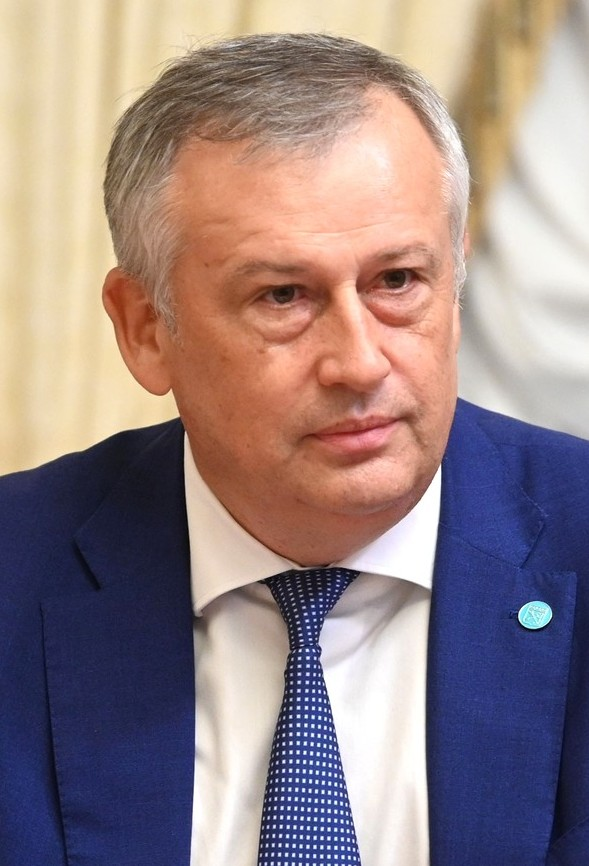

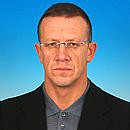
Candidate	Aleksandr Drozdenko	Andrey Lebedev
Party	United Russia	LDPR
Popular vote	756,885	60,084
Percentage	84.21%	6.69%
Governor before election
Aleksandr Drozdenko
United Russia
Governor-elect
Aleksandr Drozdenko
United Russia

The 2025 Leningrad Oblast gubernatorial election took place on 12–14 September 2025, on common election day. Incumbent Governor of Leningrad Oblast Aleksandr Drozdenko was re-elected to a fourth term in office.

== Background ==
Vice Governor of Leningrad Oblast Aleksandr Drozdenko was elected Governor of Leningrad Oblast in May 2012 by the Legislative Assembly of Leningrad Oblast, replacing retiring three-term incumbent Valery Serdyukov. Drozdenko resigned in May 2015 triggering an early gubernatorial election, which he overwhelmingly won in September 2015 with 82.10% of the vote. Governor Drozdenko ran for a third term in 2020 and won it with an even larger 83.61%.

Initially Governor of Leningrad Oblast was limited for just two consecutive terms so Drozdenko would have been term-limited in 2025 (his 2012–2015 term was reset). However, in December 2021 "On Common Principles of Organisation of Public Authority in the Subjects of the Russian Federation" law was enacted, which lifted term limits for Russian governors. Initially Aleksandr Drozdenko asked Legislative Assembly of Leningrad Oblast to uphold the term-limit and the Assembly decided not to amend the regional law. However, in December 2023 Legislative Assembly nonetheless lifted term limits, which allowed Drozdenko to seek another term in 2025.

In March 2025 during a meeting with President Vladimir Putin Governor Drozdenko announced his intention to run for a fourth term and received Putin's endorsement.

== Candidates ==
In Leningrad Oblast candidates for Governor of Leningrad Oblast can be nominated only by registered political parties. Candidate for Governor of Leningrad Oblast should be a Russian citizen and at least 30 years old. Candidates for Governor of Leningrad Oblast should not have a foreign citizenship or residence permit. Each candidate in order to be registered is required to collect at least 7% of signatures of members and heads of municipalities. Also gubernatorial candidates present 3 candidacies to the Federation Council and election winner later appoints one of the presented candidates.

=== Declared ===
Candidate name, political party		Occupation	Status	Ref.
Aleksandr Drozdenko; United Russia	Aleksandr Drozdenko	Incumbent Governor of Leningrad Oblast (2012–present)	Registered	
Andrey Lebedev; Liberal Democratic Party	Andrey Lebedev	Member of Legislative Assembly of Leningrad Oblast (2011–present); Former Member of State Duma (2008–2011); 2015 and 2020 gubernatorial candidate	Registered	
Sergey Lisovsky; The Greens		Journalist; Ecological activist	Registered	
Sergey Malinkovich; Communists of Russia		Member of Altai Krai Legislative Assembly (2021–present); Chairman of the Communists of Russia party (2022–present); Perennial candidate 2024 presidential candidate	Registered	
Igor Novikov; SR–ZP		Member of Magadan Oblast Duma (2005–present); Businessman	Registered	
Larisa Mukhina; Communist Party		Member of Koltushi Council of Deputies (2023–present); Ecological activist	Failed to qualify	
Aleksey Fedorov; Rodina		Member of Murino Council of Deputies (2019–present); Homeowners association chairman	Did not file	
Viktor Perov; Party of Social Protection		Former Member of Slantsy Council of Deputies (2005–2014); Perennial candidate 2015 Communists of Russia gubernatorial candidate 2019 Saint Petersburg gubernatorial candidate	Did not file	
Maksim Vishnevsky; Civic Initiative		Homeowners association chairman	Did not file	

=== Eliminated in the primary ===
- Mikhail Makarov (United Russia), Member of Legislative Assembly of Leningrad Oblast (2020–present)

=== Declined ===
- Nikolay Kuzmin (CPRF), Member of Legislative Assembly of Leningrad Oblast (2007–2014, 2016–present), former Member of State Duma (2014–2016), 2015 gubernatorial candidate

=== Candidates for Federation Council ===
Head candidate, political party	Candidates for Federation Council	Status
Aleksandr Drozdenko; United Russia	* Konstantin Patrayev, former First Vice Governor of Leningrad Oblast (2012–2015), Russian Army veteran * Sergey Perminov, incumbent Senator (2020–present) * Tatyana Tyurina, Deputy Chairwoman of the Legislative Assembly of Leningrad Oblast (2021–present), Member of the Legislative Assembly (2016–present)	Registered
Andrey Lebedev; Liberal Democratic Party	* Nikita Belousov, manager * Vyacheslav Dyubkov, former Deputy Chairman of the Legislative Assembly of Leningrad Oblast (2011–2016) * Veronika Gribanova, Member of Legislative Assembly of Leningrad Oblast (2025–present)	Registered
Sergey Lisovsky; The Greens	* Konstantin Gribach, ecoactivist, journalist * Tatyana Lavrenko, culture club manager * Marina Tikhonova, community activist	Registered
Sergey Malinkovich; Communists of Russia	* Andrey Gindos, drum teacher, perennial candidate * Yulia Nagornaya, lawyer * Valery Porubov, individual entrepreneur	Registered
Igor Novikov; SR–ZP	* Oleg Knyazyuk, security specialist * Aleksandra Novozhilova, special education school principal * Vera Yurchenkova, children rehabilitation centre director	Registered

== Finances ==
All sums are in rubles.

Financial Report	Source	Drozdenko	Lebedev	Lisovsky	Malinkovich	Novikov
First		TBA	304,000	226,500	226,500	300,000
Final		TBD	TBD	TBD	TBD	TBD

== Polls ==
Fieldwork date	Polling firm	Drozdenko	Lebedev	Novikov	Malinkovich	Lisovsky	None	Lead
14 September 2025	2025 election	84.2	6.7	3.0	2.7	2.2	1.2	77.5
5–19 August 2025	WCIOM	82.8	7.2	3.1	3.6	1.7	1.6	75.6

== Results ==
Summary of the 12–14 September 2025 Leningrad Oblast gubernatorial election results
Candidate	Party	Votes	%
Aleksandr Drozdenko (incumbent)	United Russia	756,885	84.21
Andrey Lebedev	Liberal Democratic Party	60,084	6.69
Igor Novikov	A Just Russia – For Truth	27,133	3.02
Sergey Malinkovich	Communists of Russia	23,825	2.65
Sergey Lisovsky	The Greens	19,758	2.20
Valid votes		887,685	98.77
Blank ballots		11,090	1.23
Total		898,775	100.00
Turnout		898,775	62.79
Registered voters		1,431,472	100.00

Governor Drozdenko re-appointed incumbent Senator Sergey Perminov (United Russia) to the Federation Council.

== See also ==
- 2025 Russian regional elections
