= Krasnopol =

Krasnopol may refer to:

- Krasnopol, Podlaskie Voivodeship, a village in north-eastern Poland
  - Gmina Krasnopol, an administrative district in Poland, of which Krasnopol is the seat
- Krasnopol (weapon system), a Soviet-designed artillery munition

== See also ==
- Krasnopolov, a village in Russia
- Krasnopolye, a village in Russia
