= Vladimir Bodyagin =

Russian politician (born 1949)

- Владимир Бодягин

Member of the Legislative Assembly of Leningrad Oblast
- Incumbent
- Assumed office 19 September 2021

Personal details
- Born: 21 July 1949 (age 77) Shimanovsk, Amur Oblast, Russian SFSR, USSR
- Party: United Russia
- Education: Saint Petersburg Electrotechnical University
- Profession: Politician

Vladimir Mikhailovich Bodyagin (Russian: Владимир Михайлович Бодягин; born 21 July 1949) is a Russian politician, who currently serves as a member of the Legislative Assembly of Leningrad Oblast since 2021.

== Biography ==
=== Early life ===
After graduating from the Saint Petersburg Electrotechnical University in 1972, Bodyagin began his political career.

In the mid-2010s, he began working for the regional branch of the United Russia in the Leningrad Oblast, and in December 2017, he was elected its leader.

=== Legislative Assembly of Leningrad Oblast ===
In the 2021 Russian regional elections, Bodyagin was elected as a member of the Legislative Assembly of Leningrad Oblast from United Russia.
