= Kaasalainen =

Surname list

Kaasalainen is a Finnish surname. Notable people with the surname include:

- Antti Kaasalainen (1875–1935), Finnish politician
- Mikko Kaasalainen (1965–2020), Finnish mathematician and physicist
- Nestori Kaasalainen (1915–2016), Finnish politician

== See also ==
- 16007 Kaasalainen, minor planet
