= Pärssinen =

Pärssinen is a Finnish surname. Notable people with the surname include:

- Hilja Pärssinen (1876–1935), Finnish schoolteacher, poet, journalist and politician
- Juuso Pärssinen (born 2001), Finnish professional ice hockey forward
- Marja Pärssinen (born 1971), Finnish butterfly and freestyle swimmer
- Matti Pärssinen (1896–1951), Finnish farmer and politician
- Raimo Pärssinen (born 1956), Swedish politician
- Timo Pärssinen (born 1977), Finnish professional ice hockey forward
