= Vadim Gustov =

Russian politician (born 1948)

- Вадим Густов
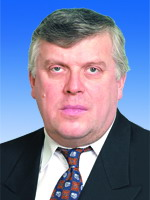
- Official portrait, 2008

Russian Federation Senator from Vladimir Oblast
- In office 28 February 2001 – 13 December 2011
- Succeeded by: Aleksandr Sinyagin

First Deputy Prime Minister of Russia
- In office 18 September 1998 – 27 April 1999
- Prime Minister: Yevgeny Primakov
- Succeeded by: Sergei Stepashin

Governor of Leningrad Oblast
- In office 18 November 1996 – 11 September 1998
- Preceded by: Alexander Belyakov
- Succeeded by: Valery Serdyukov

Personal details
- Born: Vadim Anatolyevich Gustov; 26 December 1948 (age 77) Kalinino, Alexandrovsky District, Vladimir Oblast, RSFSR, Soviet Union
- Party: Independent
- Children: 2
- Education: Moscow Geological Prospecting Institute

Vadim Anatolyevich Gustov (Russian: Вадим Анатольевич Густов; born 26 December 1948) is a Russian politician who served as first deputy prime minister of Russia from 1998 to 1999 and a regional leader.

== Early life and education ==
Gustov was born in Kalinino, Alexandrovsky District, Vladimir Oblast in 1948. He was educated in Sweden.

== Career ==
Gustov was the head of the Leningrad Oblast Council of People's Deputies until it was dissolved in October 1993. In 1994, he served as chairman of the Federation Council's Commonwealth of Independent States affairs committee. He was elected as the governor of Leningrad Oblast in September 1996, taking 53% of the votes. He was independent, but was supported by the Communist Party of the Russian Federation. He replaced Alexander Belyakov in the aforementioned post.

Gustov served as governor until his appointment as first deputy prime minister on 18 September 1998. He was succeeded by Valery Serdyukov as the governor of Leningrad Oblast.

Gustov, an independent politician, was one of two first deputy prime ministers in the cabinet of Yevgeny Primakov and was in charge of regional affairs and the relations with former Soviet republics. Gustov's tenure lasted until 27 April 1999 when he was removed from post by Russian president Boris Yeltsin. Gustov was succeeded by Sergei Stepashin in the post.

In the 1999 and 2003 elections Gustov ran for the governorship of Leningrad Oblast, but he lost both elections. In January 2002 he became a senator at the Federation Council, representing Vladimir Oblast. He was again the chairman of the council's CIS affairs committee during this period.

Since December 2011 Vadim Gustov is a member of the Legislative Assembly of Leningrad Oblast. He ran on the list of the United Russia party. On 4 July 2012, he was elected vice-speaker of the Legislative Assembly.

=== Views ===
Gustov was an anti-Yeltsin figure in the 1990s. He was not a communist and did not support the concept of a planned economy.
