= Väinö Kaasalainen =

Finnish educator and politician (1902–1955)

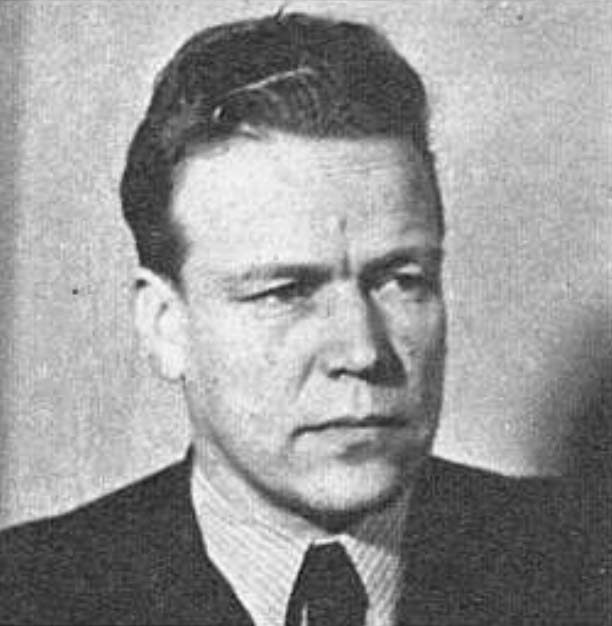
Väinö Kaasalainen

Väinö Viljam Kaasalainen (10 December 1902 – 14 April 1955) was a Finnish educator and politician, born in Pyhäjärvi Vpl. He was a member of the Parliament of Finland from 1933 to 1939 and from 1951 until his death in 1955, representing the Agrarian League. He served as Deputy Minister of Transport and Public Works from 13 January to 8 August 1944. He was the elder brother of Nestori Kaasalainen.
