= Sergey Morenkov =

Russian politician (born 1969)

- Сергей Моренков

Member of the Legislative Assembly of Leningrad Oblast
- Incumbent
- Assumed office 19 September 2021

Personal details
- Born: 4 September 1969 (age 56) Khabarovsk, Russian SFSR, USSR
- Party: United Russia
- Children: 4
- Education: St. Petersburg State Transport University
- Profession: Politician, businessman

Sergey Nikolaevich Morenkov (Russian: Сергей Николаевич Моренков; born 4 September 1969) is a Russian politician who currently serves as a member of the Legislative Assembly of Leningrad Oblast since 2021.

== Biography ==
=== Early life ===
After graduating from the St. Petersburg State Transport University, Morenkov began his political career.

Before entering regional politics, Morenkov worked in business and public organizations. He was the president of the non-profit partnership Union of Companies 'Strategiya Rost'.

=== Legislative Assembly of Leningrad Oblast ===
In the 2021 Russian regional elections, Morenkov was elected as a member of the Legislative Assembly of Leningrad Oblast from United Russia in the 8th electoral district.
