= Governor of Leningrad Oblast =

Highest-ranking official in Leningrad Oblast, Russia

- Coat of arms of Leningrad Oblast

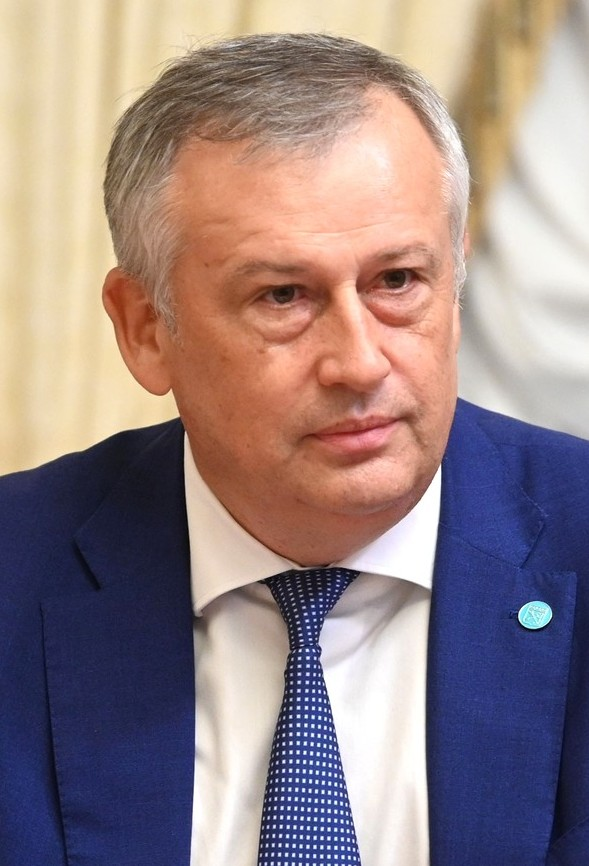
- Incumbent; Aleksandr Drozdenko since May 28, 2012
- Seat: Saint Petersburg
- Term length: Five years, renewable
- Inaugural holder: Aleksandr Belyakov
- Formation: 1991
- Website: lenobl.ru/en/

The Governor of Leningrad Oblast (Russian: Губернатор Ленинградской области) is the head of executive branch for the Leningrad Oblast, considered as Prime Minister of Leningrad Oblast.

The office of Governor is an elected position, for which elected officials serve four year terms. While individual politicians may serve as many terms as they can be elected to, Governors cannot be elected to more than two consecutive terms.

The official residence for the Governor is located in Saint Petersburg. The current Governor is Aleksandr Drozdenko, who assumed office on May 11, 2012.

== List of office-holders ==
No.	Portrait	Governor	Tenure	Time in office	Party	Election
1		Aleksandr Belyakov (born 1945)	20 October 1991 – 3 October 1996 (lost election)	4 years, 349 days	Independent	Appointed
2		Vadim Gustov (born 1948)	3 October 1996 – 21 September 1998 (resigned)	1 year, 353 days	Independent	1996
–		Valery Serdyukov (born 1945)	21 September 1998 – 19 September 1999	13 years, 250 days	Independent	Acting
3		Valery Serdyukov (born 1945)	19 September 1999 – 28 May 2012 (resigned)	13 years, 250 days	United Russia	1999; 2003; 2007
4		Aleksandr Drozdenko (born 1964)	28 May 2012 – 12 May 2015 (resigned)	14 years, 155 days	United Russia	2012
–		Aleksandr Drozdenko (born 1964)	12 May 2015 – 13 September 2015	14 years, 155 days	United Russia	Acting
(4)		Aleksandr Drozdenko (born 1964)	13 September 2015 – Incumbent	14 years, 155 days	United Russia	2015; 2020; 2025

== Chairmen of Executive Committee of Leningrad Oblast (1927–1991) ==
1. Nikolay Komarov (1927–1930)
2. Ivan Kodatsky (1930–1931)
3. Fyodor Tsarkov (1931—1932)
4. Pyotr Strouppe (1932–1936)
5. Alexey Grichmanov (1936–1937)
6. Pyoter Tyurkin (1937)
7. Anton Nikitin (1937)
8. Nikolai Solovyov (1938–1946)
9. Ilya Kharitonov (1946–1948)
10. Ivan Dmitriev (1948–1950)
11. Ivan Petrov (1950–1952)
12. Vladimir Ponomaryov (1952–1954)
13. Georgiy Vorobyov (1954–1957)
14. Nikolay Smirnov (1957–1961)
15. Grigoriy Kozlov (1961–1963, 1964–1968)
16. Vasily Sominich (1963–1964) / Boris Popov (1963–1964)
17. Alexander Shibalov (1968–1980)
18. Ratmir Bobovikov (1980–1983)
19. Nikolai Popov (1983–1989)
20. Yury Yarov (1989–1991)
