= Lake Otradnoye =

Lake in Leningrad, Russia

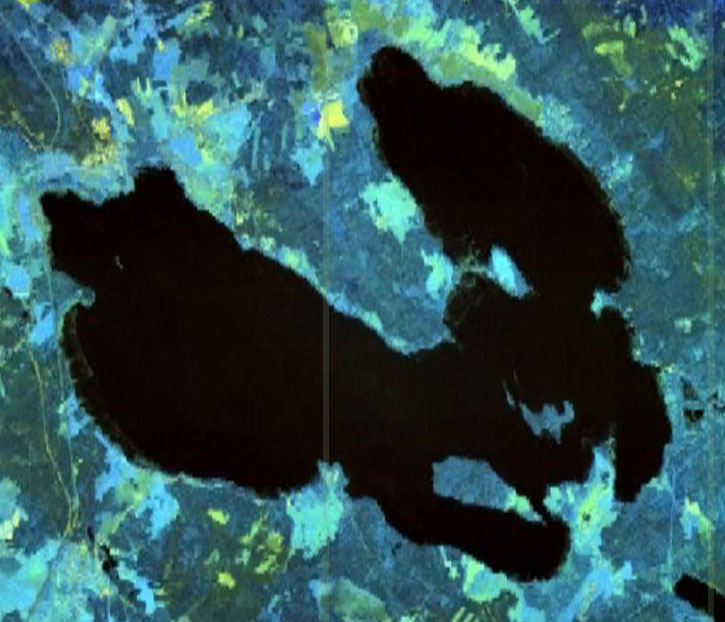
- Satellite image

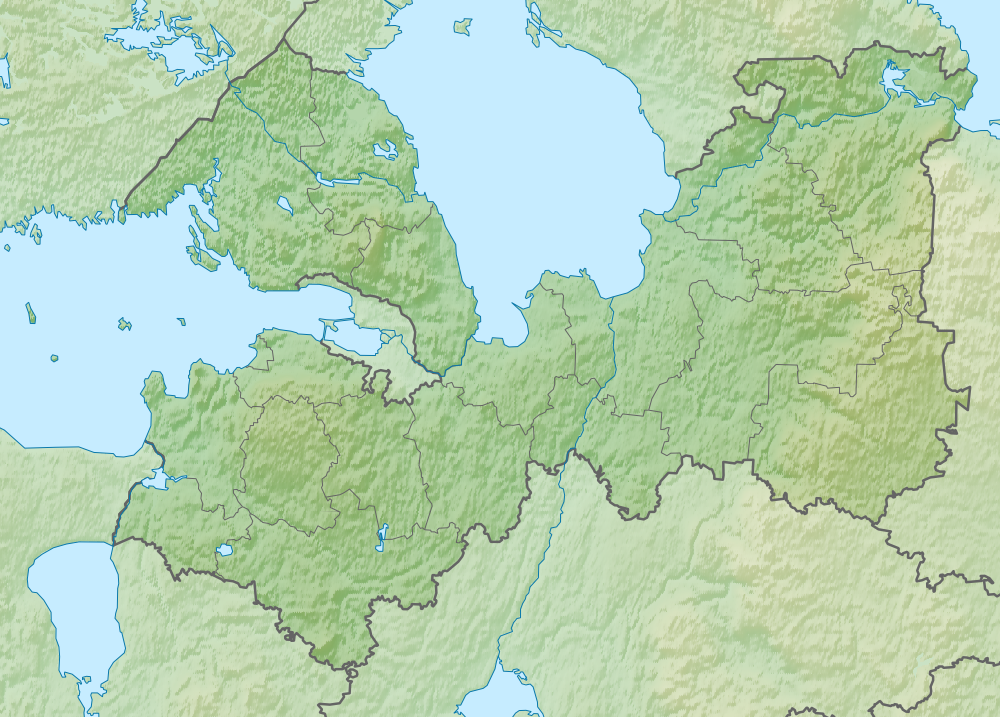
- Location within Leningrad Oblast
- Location: Priozersky District, Leningrad Oblast
- Coordinates: 60°48′02″N 30°12′004″E
- Catchment area: 275 square kilometres (106 mi^{2})
- Basin countries: Russia
- Surface area: 66 square kilometres (25 mi^{2})

Lake Otradnoye (Russian: о́зеро Отра́дное; Finnish: Pyhäjärvi) is a lake on Karelian Isthmus, in the Priozersky District of Leningrad Oblast, south of the town of Priozersk. It is 66 square kilometres (25 mi^{2}) in area and its drainage basin is 275 square kilometres (106 mi^{2}).

Lake Otradnoye is the source of the Pionerka (Pyhäjöki) River which flows westward to drain into Lake Komsomolskoye, which in turn drains into the Vesyolaya River, a tributary of the Vuoksi River. It belongs to the basin of Lake Ladoga, about 5 kilometres (3.1 mi) to the east. The main tributary is the River Luchik, flowing southward. It has an irregular shape, with two bays separated by a peninsula, and several islands including the largest, Barsukovy and Troynoy.

The shores are populated with the settlements of Otradnoye, Plodovoye, Uralskoye, Solnechnoye, Kutuzovskoye, Yablonovka, Krasnopolye and Tsvetkovo. Roads run along all shores except the eastern one. A stretch of the A129 highway connecting Saint Petersburg and Sortavala via Priozersk runs along the western shore, whereas other local roads have access to A129, as well as to the shore of Lake Ladoga. The Saint Petersburg – Hiitola railroad runs along the western shore, too, with Otradnoye platform near the lakeshore.
