= Aleksandr Belyakov (politician) =

Russian politician (born 1945)

Alexander Belyakov
- Александр Беляков
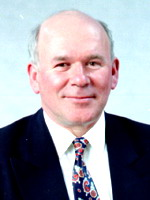

1st Head of Leningrad Oblast Administration
- In office 20 October 1991 – 18 November 1996
- Succeeded by: Vadim Gustov

Personal details
- Born: Aleksandr Semyonovich Belyakov; 20 May 1945 (age 80) Sortavala, Russian SFSR, Soviet Union
- Party: Our Home is Russia (1995); United Russia (2003)
- Spouse: Antonina Borisovna

Alexander Semyonovich Belyakov (Russian: Алекса́ндр Семёнович Беляко́в; born 20 May 1945) is a Russian politician who served as Governor of Leningrad Oblast in 1991–1996 and member of the State Duma of the Russian Federation in 1999–2005.

== Biography ==
Alexander Belyakov was born in Sortavala, Karelo-Finnish SSR in 1945.

He was elected governor of Leningrad Oblast in 1991 and joined the pro-Boris Yeltsin Our Home is Russia political party in 1995. He was defeated by an independent, Communist Party of the Russian Federation-backed candidate, Vadim Gustov in the election in 1996.

Belyakov served as president of the SBS Agro Bank from 1997–1998 before being elected to the State Duma of the Russian Federation in 1999 and serving as chairman of its national resources committee. He was re-elected as a United Russia candidate in 2003.

Belyakov is currently president of the Russian Association of Paper & Pulp Organizations and Enterprises (RAO BUMPROM).

== Family ==
He is married to Antonina Borisovna Belyakova. They have a son and a daughter. There are three grand granddaughters.

== Honours and awards ==
- Order "For Merit to the Fatherland", 4th class
- Order of Honour (26 June 1995) - for services to the state, achievements in work, a great contribution to strengthening friendship and cooperation among peoples and selfless actions in rescuing the dying
