= Sergey Perminov =

Russian politician (born 1968)

- Сергей Перминов
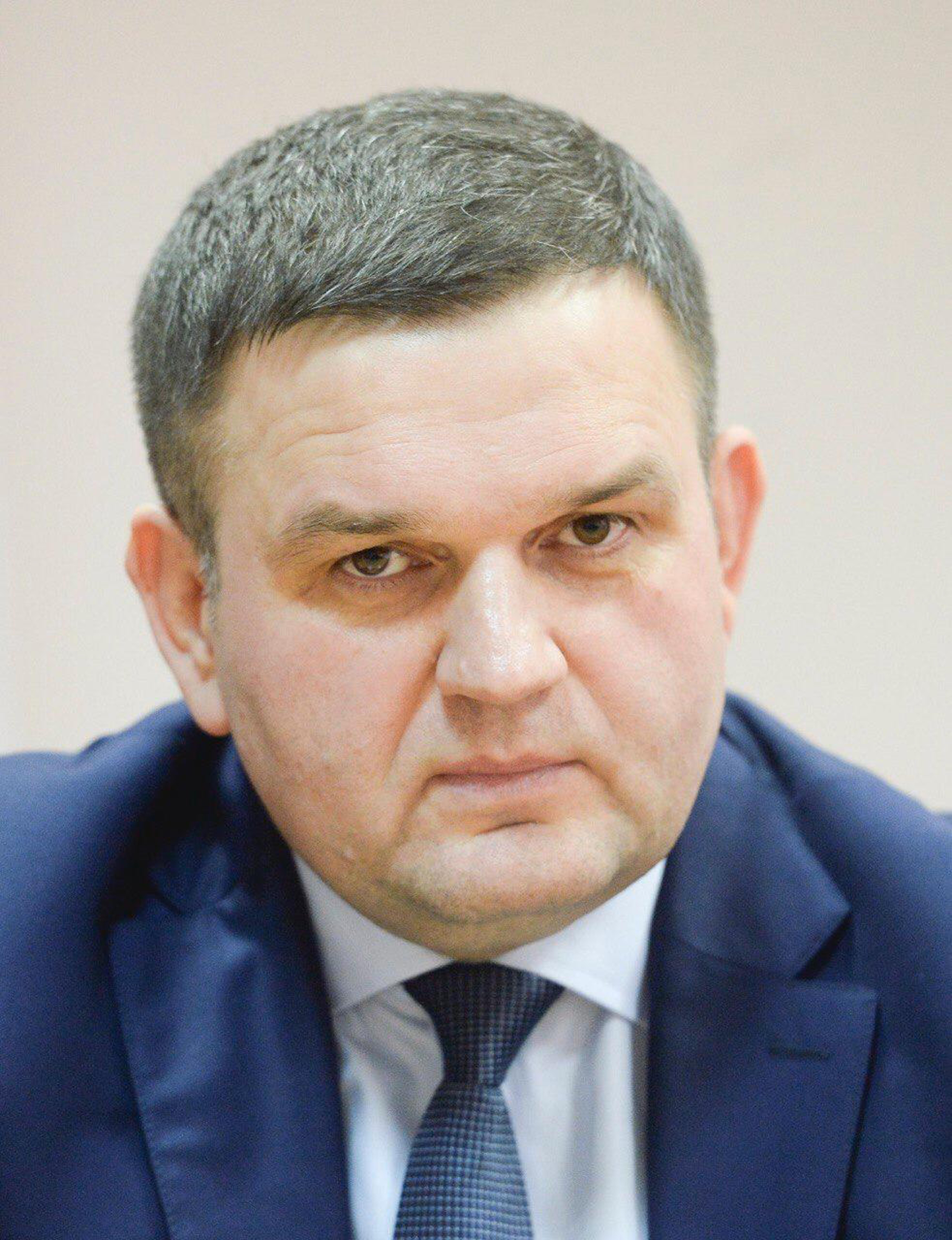

Senator from Leningrad Oblast
- Incumbent
- Assumed office 17 September 2020
- Preceded by: Igor Fomin

Personal details
- Born: Sergey Perminov; 16 September 1968 (age 58) Leningrad, Russian Soviet Federative Socialist Republic, Soviet Union
- Party: United Russia
- Education: Adyghe State University

Sergey Nikolayevich Perminov (Russian: Сергей Николаевич Перминов; born 16 September 1968) is a Russian politician serving as a senator from Leningrad Oblast since 17 September 2020.

== Career ==
Sergey Perminov was born on 16 September 1968 in Leningrad. In 1995, he graduated from the Adyghe State University. From 2000 to 2012, he worked as a lawyer at the St. Petersburg City Bar Association. From 2008 to 2010, Perminov served as a representative of the Legislative Assembly of Saint Petersburg in the qualification commission of the Bar Association of St. Petersburg. In 2013, he became the Vice Governor of Leningrad Oblast. On 17 September 2020, he became the senator from Leningrad Oblast.

== Sanctions ==
Sergey Perminov is under personal sanctions introduced by the European Union, the United Kingdom, the USA, Canada, Switzerland, Australia, Ukraine, New Zealand, for ratifying the decisions of the "Treaty of Friendship, Cooperation and Mutual Assistance between the Russian Federation and the Donetsk People's Republic and between the Russian Federation and the Luhansk People's Republic" and providing political and economic support for Russia's annexation of Ukrainian territories.
