= Antti Kaasalainen =

Finnish educator, journalist, farmer and politician (1875–1935)

Anders (Antti) Kaasalainen (3 October 1875 – 27 April 1935) was a Finnish educator, journalist, farmer and politician, born in Pyhäjärvi Vpl. He was a member of the Diet of Finland from 1904 to 1905 and from 1905 to 1906 and of the Parliament of Finland from 1909 to 1911, representing the Young Finnish Party.
