= Juhana Toiviainen =

Finnish politician

Juhana Tuomas Toiviainen (31 May 1879, Pyhäjärvi Vpl – 7 June 1937) was a Finnish politician. He was a Member of the Parliament of Finland from 1920 to 1922, representing the National Progressive Party.
