= Otradnoye, Priozersky District, Leningrad Oblast =

Rural locality in Priozersky District, Russia

Coordinates: 60°50′N 30°08′E

Otradnoye (Russian: Отра́дное; Finnish: Pyhäjärvi Vpl) is a rural locality (a settlement at the railway station) in Priozersky District of Leningrad Oblast and a railway station of the Saint Petersburg-Hiitola railway, located on the Karelian Isthmus at the western shore of Lake Otradnoye (Lake Pyhäjärvi).

Before the Winter War and Continuation War, it was the administrative center of the Pyhäjärvi Municipality in Viipuri Province of Finland. It is birthplace of Juhana Toiviainen (1879–1937), Karl Lennart Oesch (1892–1978), Matti Pärssinen (1896–1951), Armas Äikiä (1904–1965), Väinö Kaasalainen (1902–1955) and Nestori Kaasalainen (1915–2016).
