= Aleksandr Drozdenko =

Governor of Leningrad Oblast since 2012

Aleksander Drozdenko
- Александр Дрозденко
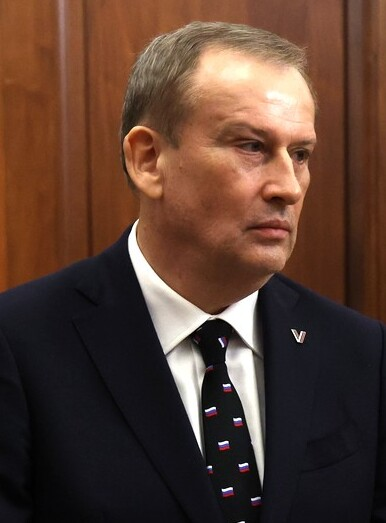
- Drozdenko in 2025

4th Governor of Leningrad Oblast
- Incumbent
- Assumed office 28 May 2012
- President: Vladimir Putin
- Preceded by: Valery Serdyukov

Deputy Governor of Leningrad Oblast & Chairman of the Leningrad Regional Committee for State Property Management
- In office 6 November 2002 – 28 May 2012

Mayor of Kingisepp
- In office 1996–2002

Personal details
- Born: Aleksandr Yurievich Drozdenko; 1 November 1964 (age 62) Akzhar, Kazakh SSR, Soviet Union
- Party: United Russia

Aleksander Yurievich Drozdenko (Russian: Александр Юрьевич Дрозденко; 1 November 1964) is a Russian economist and politician. He has been Governor of Leningrad Oblast since 28 May 2012.

== Early life and education ==
Drozdenko was born in the village of Akzhar, Bayzak District, Jambyl Region, Kazakh Soviet Socialist Republic, USSR. He graduated from the Leningrad Agricultural Institute with a degree in economics and organization of agriculture in 1986 and obtained a PhD in economics in 2007.

== Political career ==
From 1988 to 2002, he worked in various positions in Kingiseppsky District of Leningrad Region and was chairman of the Kingisepp City Council of People's Deputies and mayor of Kingisepp District.

On 6 November 2002, he was appointed as Vice Governor of Leningrad Region and chairman of the Leningrad Region Committee on State Property Management. At the same time, he was a head of the Leningrad regional office of the Ministry of Property Relations of Russia.

=== Governor of Leningrad Oblast ===
Drozdenko's candidacy to replace Valery Serdyukov as governor was submitted by President Dmitry Medvedev to the Leningrad Oblast Legislative Assembly on 5 May 2012. He took office on 28 May 2012, after the assembly approved his appointment on 12 May. Drozdenko resigned early in May 2015 to run as the United Russia nominee after direct gubernatorial elections were reinstated in Russia. He received 82.1 percent of the vote in the September 2015 election. He secured two subsequent terms, winning 83.61% of the vote in September 2020 and 84.21% in September 2025.

As governor, Drozdenko focused on attracting industrial investment, expanding regional infrastructure, and paying down commercial debt. In December 2021, he was appointed secretary of the Leningrad Oblast branch of United Russia and entered the party's Supreme Council.

=== Russo-Ukrainian war and sanctions ===
Drozdenko openly backed the Kremlin's military campaign since the beginning of the Russo-Ukrainian war and denounced Western sanctions and arms transfers to Ukraine. His administration also took over rebuilding Yenakiieve in Russian-occupied Donetsk Oblast.

In July 2022, the United Kingdom, the United States, Canada, and Ukraine imposed international sanctions on Drozdenko due to his position as a regional official backing Russian state policy. The British government increased the scope of its actions against him in March 2023 to include limitations on trust services.

== Personal life ==
Drozdenko and his wife, Irina, have two daughters, Yulia and Sofia. His son-in-law holds co-ownership stakes in telecommunications infrastructure in northwest Russia, while his daughter Yulia Richard and her French husband, Jean-François Richard, live in France and own commercial and real estate assets in Nice through a family partnership, according to an investigation by the independent Russian outlet iStories.

== Sanctions ==
He was sanctioned by the UK government in 2022 in relation to the Russo-Ukrainian War.

== Awards and honors ==
Drozdenko is the recipient of the Order of Friendship of Kazakhstan, 2nd degree (2026).
