= Krasnopolov =

Village in Russia

Krasnopolov Краснополов
- Khutor
- Location within Volgograd Oblast Location within Russia
- Coordinates: 49°50′N 42°02′E
- Country: Russia
- Region: Volgograd Oblast
- District: Kumylzhensky District
- Time zone: UTC+4:00

Krasnopolov (Russian: Краснополов) is a rural locality (a khutor) in Shakinskoye Rural Settlement, Kumylzhensky District, Volgograd Oblast, Russia. As of 2010, Krasnopolov's population is 95, a small part of the oblast's (region) population of 2,500,781. There are only 2 roads in the locality.

== Geography ==
Krasnopolov is located in forest steppe, on Khopyorsko-Buzulukskaya Plain, on the bank of the Srednyaya Yelan River, 49 km west of Kumylzhenskaya (the district's administrative centre) by road. The closest locality to Krasnopolov is Kalinin.
