= Matti Pärssinen =

Finnish politician

Matti Pärssinen (20 April 1896 in Pyhäjärvi Vpl – 21 April 1951) was a Finnish farmer and politician. He was a member of the Parliament of Finland from 1939 to 1948, representing the Agrarian League.
