= Leningrad Oblast =

First-level administrative division of Russia

Leningrad Oblast Ленинградская область (Russian)
- Oblast
- Flag Coat of arms
- Anthem: "Semya Leningradskaya"

- Location within European Russia
- Coordinates: 60°03′N 31°45′E
- Country: Russia
- Federal district: Northwestern
- Economic region: Northwestern
- Established: August 1, 1927
- Administrative center: Gatchina

Government
  - Body: Legislative Assembly
  - Governor: Aleksandr Drozdenko

Area
  - Total: 83,908 km^{2} (32,397 sq mi)
  - Rank: 38th

Population (2021 census)
  - Total: 2,000,997
  - Estimate (2018): 1,813,816
  - Rank: 23rd
  - Density: 23.848/km^{2} (61.765/sq mi)
  - Urban: 67.3%
  - Rural: 32.7%

GDP (nominal, 2024)
  - Total: ₽2.4 trillion (US$28.21 billion)
  - Per capita: ₽1.17 million (US$13,777.25)
- Time zone: UTC+3 (MSK)
- ISO 3166 code: RU-LEN
- License plates: 47, 147
- OKTMO ID: 41000000
- Official languages: Russian
- Website: http://www.lenobl.ru

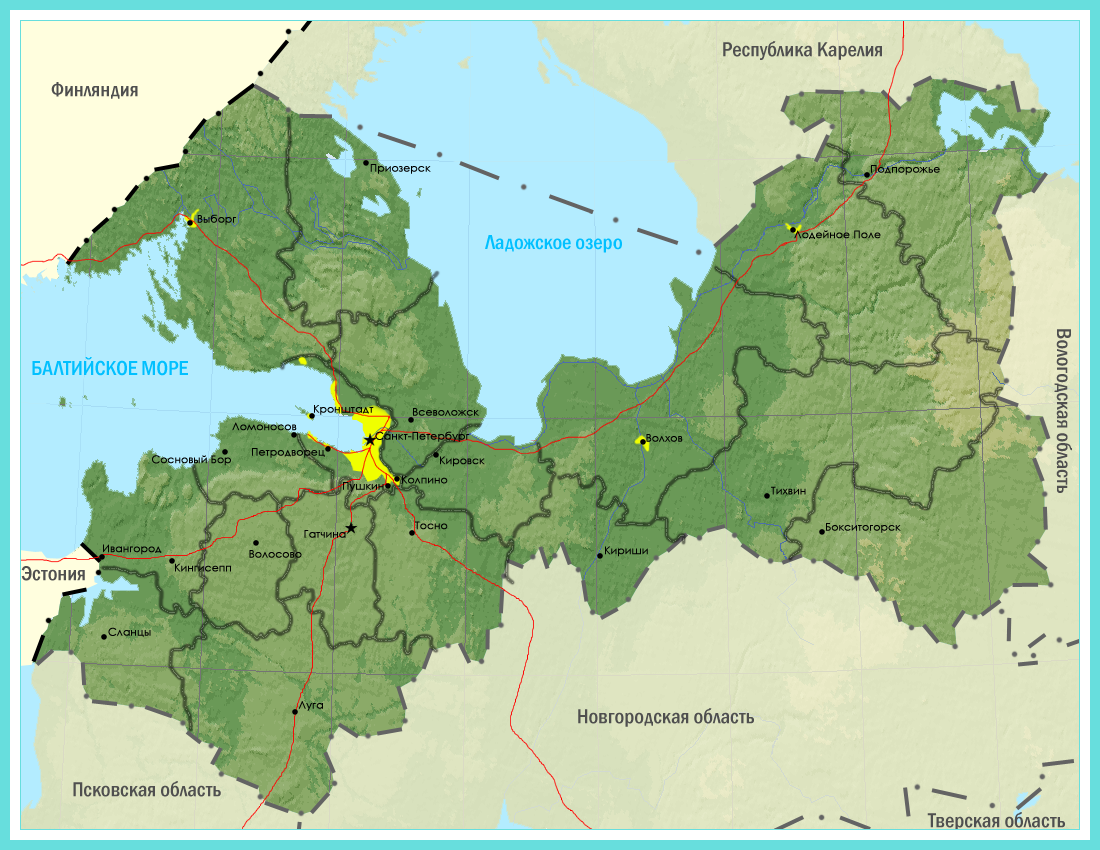
Map of Leningrad Oblast

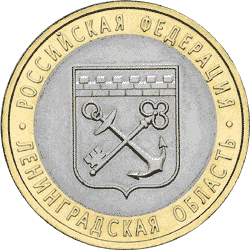
Commemorative coin of the Bank of Russia with a face value of 10 rubles (2005)

Leningrad Oblast (Russian: Ленинградская область, romanized: Leningradskaya oblastʹ, IPA: [lʲɪnʲɪnˈgratskəjə ˈobləsʲtʲ]; Veps: Leningradan agj; Finnish: Leningradin alue) is a federal subject of Russia (an oblast). The oblast has an area of 84,500 square kilometres (32,600 sq mi) and a population of 2,000,997 (2021 Census); up from 1,716,868 recorded in the 2010 Census. Leningrad Oblast is highly industrialized. Its administrative center and largest city is Gatchina.

The oblast was established on 1 August 1927, although it was not until 1946 that the oblast's borders had been mostly settled in their present position. The oblast was named after the city of Leningrad. In 1991, the city restored its original name, Saint Petersburg, but the oblast retains the name of Leningrad. It overlaps the historical region of Ingria, and is bordered by Finland (Kymenlaakso and South Karelia) in the northwest and Estonia (Ida-Viru County) in the west, as well as five federal subjects of Russia: the Republic of Karelia in the northeast, Vologda Oblast in the east, Novgorod Oblast in the south, Pskov Oblast in the southwest, and the federal city of Saint Petersburg in the west.

The first governor of Leningrad Oblast was Vadim Gustov (in 1996–1998). The current governor, since 2012, is Aleksandr Drozdenko.

== Geography ==
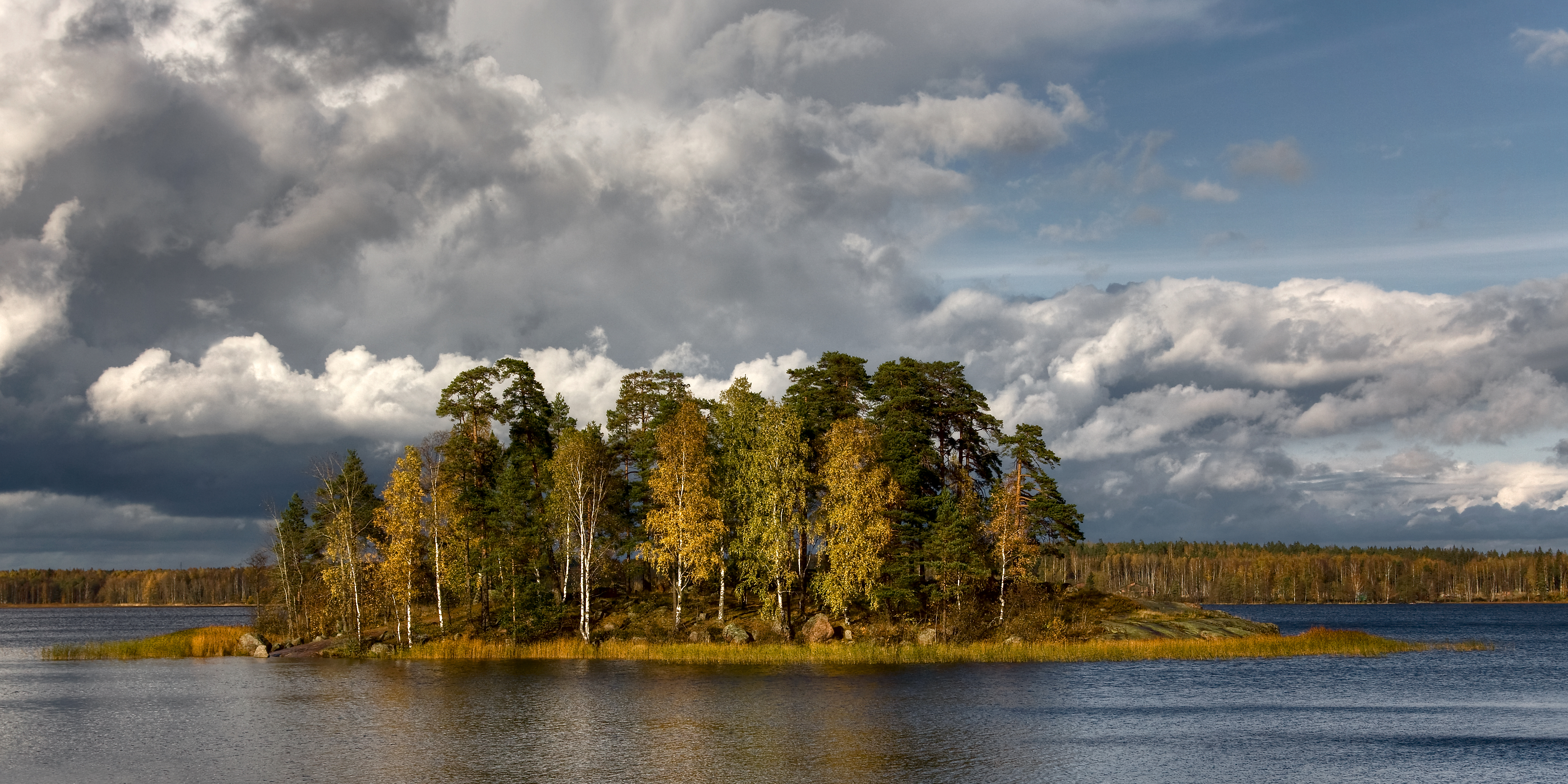
Monrepos Park in Vyborg

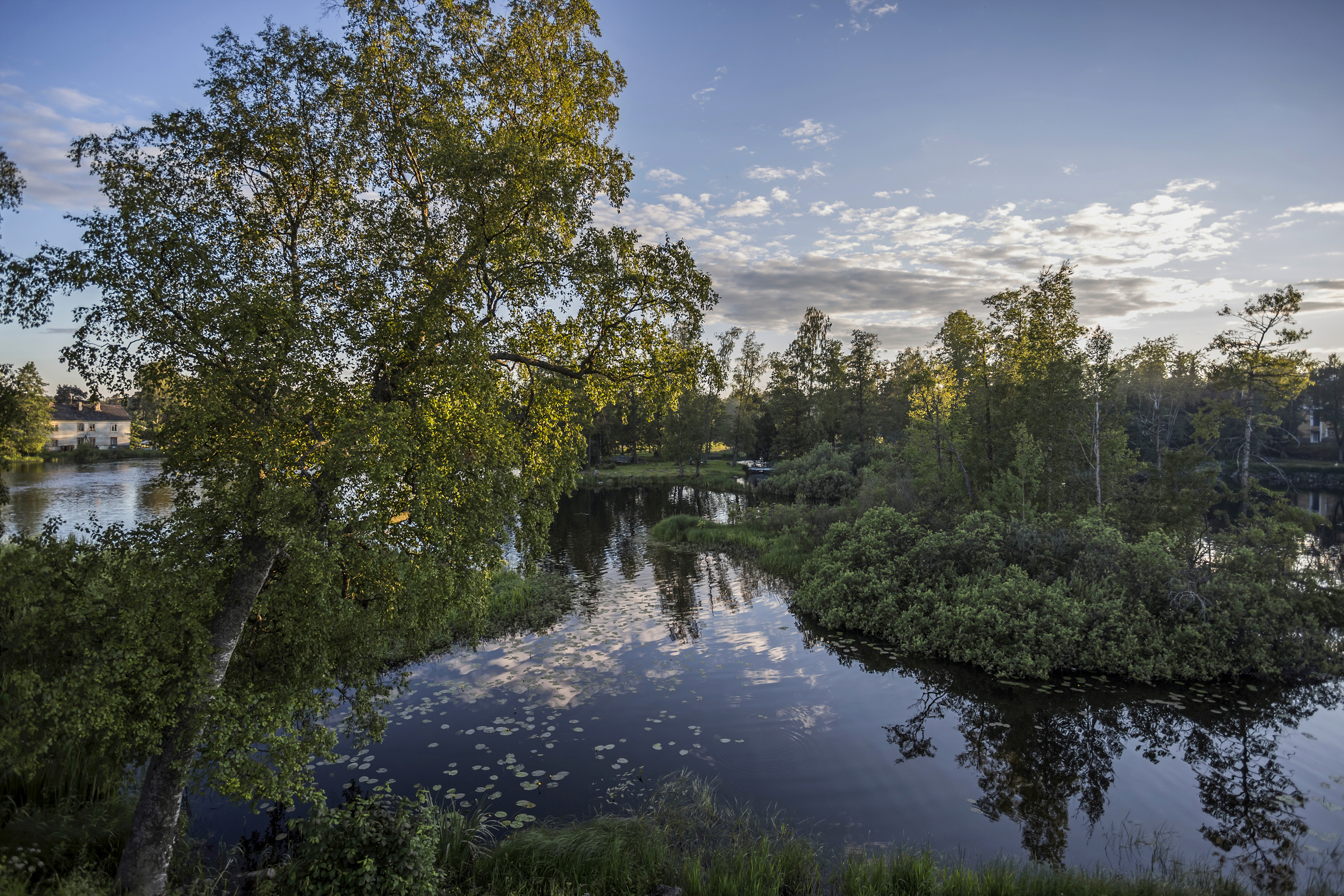
The Vuoksi in Priozersk

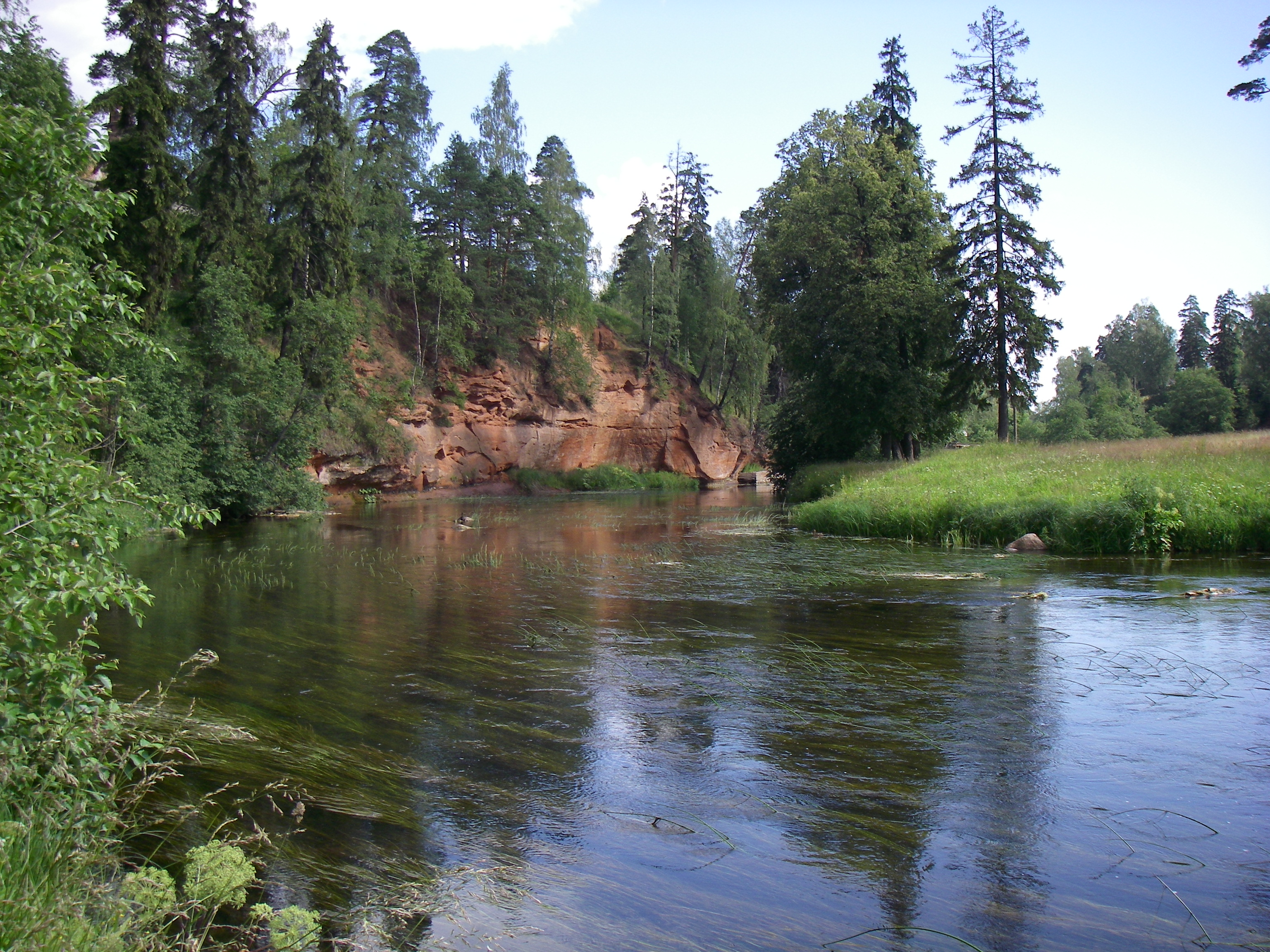
The Oredezh River near Siversky

Leningrad Oblast is located around the Gulf of Finland and south of two great freshwater lakes, Lake Ladoga and Lake Onega. The oblast includes the Karelian Isthmus and some islands, including Gogland in the Gulf of Finland and Konevets in Lake Ladoga.

Much of the area of the oblast belongs to the drainage basin of the Neva, which is the only outflow of Lake Ladoga. The Neva, which flows to the Gulf of Finland (the city of Saint Petersburg is located in its river delta) is relatively short, but its drainage basin is very large, including Lake Onega and Lake Ilmen. The Svir and the Volkhov flow from Lake Onega and Lake Ilmen, respectively, to Lake Ladoga. Other major tributaries of Lake Ladoga include the Vuoksi and the Syas. Rivers in the western part of the oblast flow to the Gulf of Finland; the two biggest rivers there are the Luga and the Narva, which forms the border of Russia and Estonia. Small areas in the east of the oblast lie within the river basin of the Chagodoshcha, a tributary of the Mologa, and of the Suda, both within the Volga basin. A ridgeline in Tikhvinsky District in the eastern oblast forms part of the divide between the Baltic Sea and Caspian Sea basins.

The terrain of Leningrad Oblast is relatively flat and mostly covered with forest and swamps. An exception is the rocky Karelian Isthmus, which contains a lake district, as well as the Vepsian Upland in the east. The biggest lakes on the isthmus are Lake Vuoksa, Lake Sukhodolskoye, and Lake Otradnoye.

Leningrad Oblast contains two federally protected natural areas, the Nizhnesvirsky Nature Reserve and Mshinskoye Boloto Zakaznik, both created to protect the forest and swamp landscapes of northwestern Russia.

=== Flora ===
The most taxonomically diverse vascular plant families are Asteraceae, Cyperaceae, Poaceae and Rosaceae. By far the most diverse genus is Carex (68 species). The diversity in genera Hieracium (with Pilosella), Ranunculus (with Batrachium), Alchemilla, Galium, Potamogeton, Salix, Veronica, Viola, Juncus, Artemisia, Potentilla, Rumex, Festuca, Epilobium, Poa, Trifolium, Campanula, Vicia, Lathyrus, Geranium is also considerable. The territory has no endemic plant taxa. Vascular plant species of Leningrad Oblast listed in the red data book of Russia are Botrychium simplex, Cephalanthera rubra, Cypripedium calceolus, Epipogium aphyllum, Lobelia dortmanna, Myrica gale, Ophrys insectifera, Orchis militaris, Pulsatilla pratensis, Pulsatilla vernalis.

== History ==
=== Early history ===
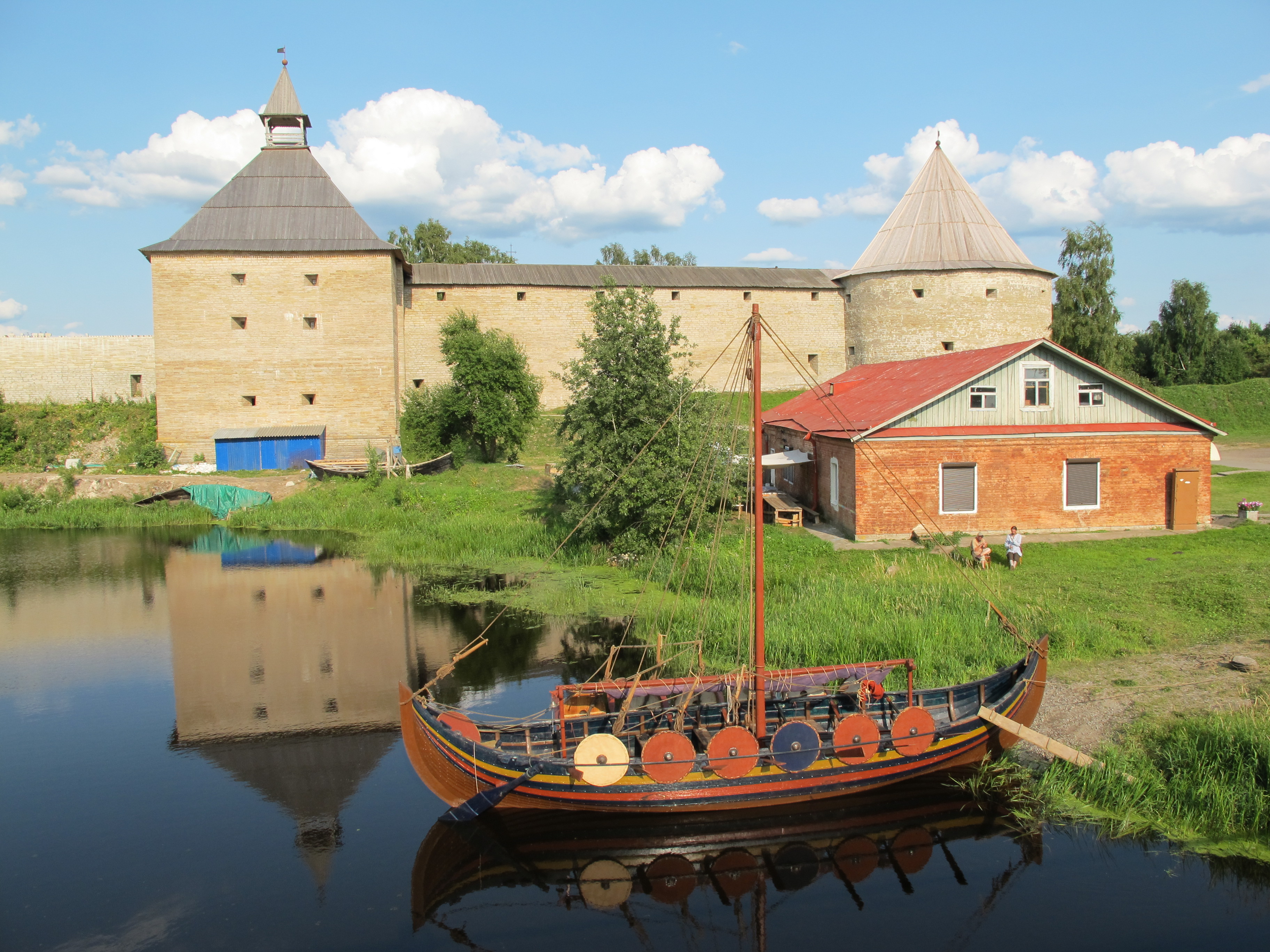
The fortress in Staraya Ladoga

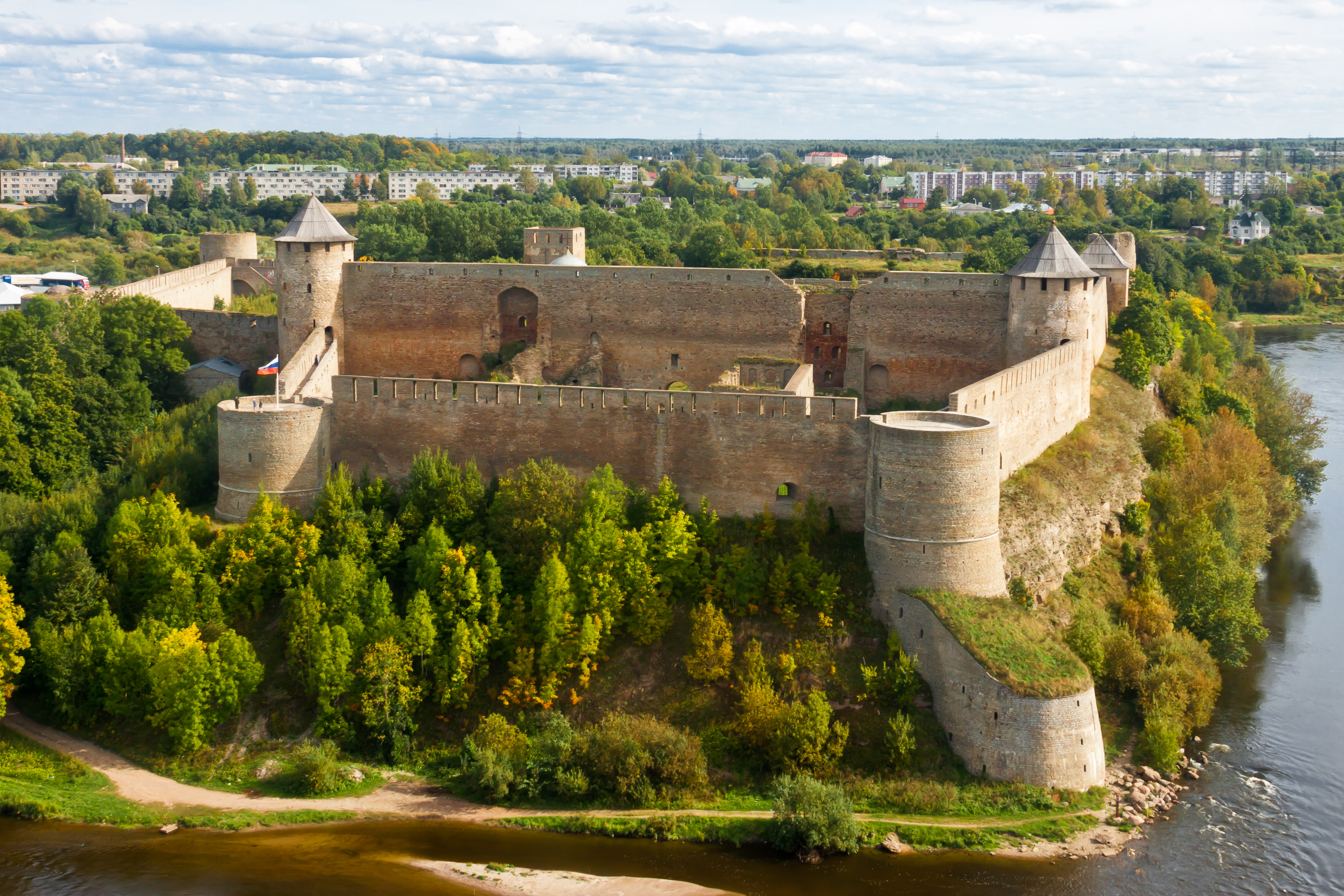
Ivangorod fortress

The territory of present-day Leningrad Oblast was populated shortly after the end of the Weichselian glaciation and now hosts numerous archaeological remnants. The Volga trade route and trade route from the Varangians to the Greeks crossed the territory. Staraya Ladoga, the first capital of legendary Rurik, founded in the 8th-9th century, is situated in the east of the oblast, on the Volkhov River.

In the 12th-15th centuries, the territory was divided between the Kingdom of Sweden and Novgorod Republic (see Swedish-Novgorodian Wars) and populated mostly by various Baltic Finns people such as Karelians (northwest), Izhorians and Votes (west), Vepsians (east), as well as Ilmen Slavs of Novgorod (south). During the Russo-Swedish Wars of the 15th-17th centuries, the border moved back and forth over the land.

The central part of the territory is known as the historical region of Ingria (or the land of Izhora) and in the 17th century, after most of the present-day territory of Leningrad Oblast was captured by Sweden with the Treaty of Stolbovo of 1617, became subject to substantial Finnish Lutheran population influx from Finnish Karelia (which included Karelian Isthmus, the northwestern part of present-day Leningrad Oblast) and Savonia. Having faced religious pressure from Lutheran pastors and Swedish authorities, the local Orthodox population of Russian and Finnic ancestry massively fled from Ingria to neighbour Russian provinces, so Ingrian Finns soon became the dominant ethnic group.

During the Great Northern War (1700–1721) the territory of what is now Leningrad Oblast was conquered from Sweden by Russia under Peter the Great, who founded Saint Petersburg amidst the land in 1703, which soon became the capital of the Russian Empire. In 1708, most of the territory was organized into Ingermanland Governorate under Governor General Alexander Menshikov. It was renamed Saint Petersburg Governorate in 1710 (the borders of that governorate, however, differed very significantly from those of the present-day oblast and included much of the areas of current Novgorod, Pskov, and Vologda Oblasts). In 1721, the territorial concessions of Sweden were confirmed with the Treaty of Nystad.

The life of the countryside was greatly influenced by the vicinity of the imperial capital, which became a growing market for its agricultural production as well as the main consumer of its mineral and forest resources. In 1719–1810, Ladoga Canal was dug between the Svir River and the Neva River as part of the Volga-Baltic waterway to bypass stormy waters of Lake Ladoga. Since the advent of rail transport in the late 19th century, the areas in the vicinity of Saint Petersburg had been popular summer resort destinations (dachas) for its residents. However, while Saint Petersburg itself was populated mostly by Russians from the very beginning, it was not until the 20th century that its surrounding population was Russified.

In 1914, with the beginning of World War I, Saint Petersburg was renamed Petrograd and the governorate was accordingly renamed Petrograd Governorate. After the Russian Revolution, in 1918, the capital was transferred from Petrograd to Moscow, farther from the borders of the country. In 1919, during the Russian Civil War, the Northwestern White Army advancing from Estonia and led by Nikolai Yudenich tried to capture Petrograd and even managed to reach its southern outskirts, but the attack against the Red Army under Leon Trotsky ultimately failed, and Yudenich retreated. The border with Estonia was established in the Russian-Estonian Treaty of Tartu of 1920. Finland-backed Ingrian Finns of North Ingria attempted to secede in 1918–1920, but were incorporated back with the Russian-Finnish Treaty of Tartu, which settled the border between Finland and Soviet Russia. In 1924, Petrograd was renamed Leningrad, and Petrograd Governorate was again renamed accordingly (Leningrad Governorate).

=== Leningrad Oblast ===
Leningrad Oblast was established on 1 August 1927, by the resolutions of the All-Russian Central Executive Committee "On the Establishment of Leningrad Oblast" and "On the Borders and Composition of the Okrugs of Leningrad Oblast" by merging Cherepovets, Leningrad, Murmansk, Novgorod, and Pskov Governorates. The territory of the oblast corresponded to the modern territories of the present-day Leningrad Oblast (with the exception of the Karelian Isthmus and the territories along the border with Estonia), Novgorod Oblast, Pskov Oblast, parts of Vologda Oblast, most of Murmansk Oblast, and the federal city of Saint Petersburg. The total area of the oblast was 360,400 square kilometres (139,200 sq mi); more than four times larger than the modern entity. Administratively, the oblast was divided into nine okrugs (Borovichi, Cherepovets, Leningrad, Lodeynoye Pole, Luga, Murmansk, Novgorod, Pskov, and Velikiye Luki), each of which was in turn subdivided into districts.

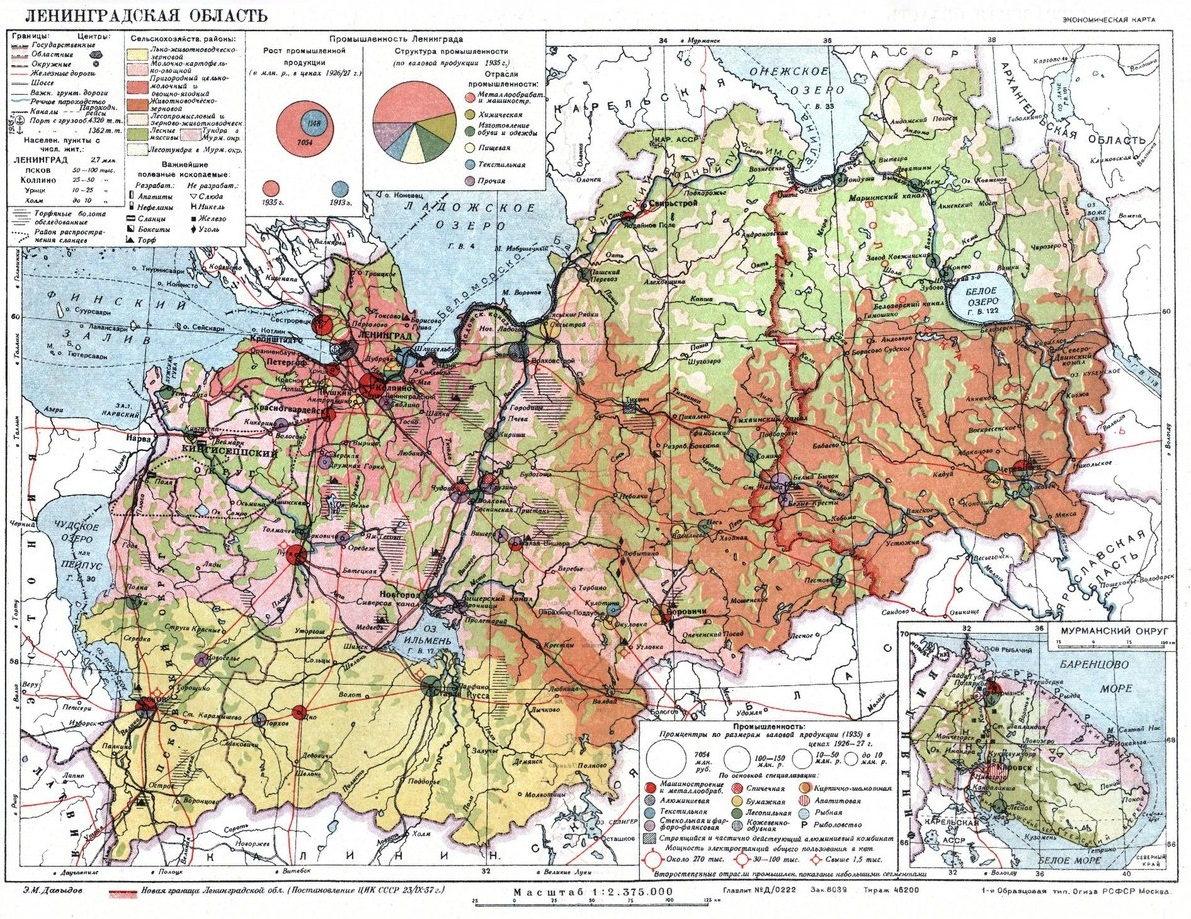
The territory of Leningrad Oblast by 1938, as illustrated in the Great Soviet Encyclopedia (1st ed., vol. 36, 1938)

In 1929, Velikiye Luki Okrug was transferred to newly formed Western Oblast. Leningrad was administratively separated from Leningrad Oblast in December 1931. In 1935 five southernmost districts were made part of Kalinin Oblast. In 1936 some parts of the territory of Leningrad Suburban District of Leningrad was returned to Leningrad Oblast and divided into Vsevolozhsky District, Krasnoselsky District, Pargolovsky District and Slutsky District (renamed Pavlovsky District in 1944). Vologda Oblast, which has included the easternmost districts of Leningrad Oblast (former Cherepovets Governorate), was created in 1937. Murmansk Oblast was split from Leningrad Oblast in 1938.

In the autumn of 1934, the Forbidden Border Zone along the western border of the Soviet Union was established, where nobody could appear without special permission issued by the NKVD. It was officially only 7.5 km deep initially, but along the Estonian border it extended to as much as 90 km. The zone was to be cleansed of Finnic and other peoples who were considered "politically unreliable" by the regime. Starting from the 1929, the Soviet authorities carried out mass deportations of the Ingrian Finnish population of the oblast, which constituted the majority in many rural localities as late as in the beginning of the 20th century, to the east, replacing them with people from other parts of the Soviet Union.

On 30 November 1939, the Soviet Union waged the Winter War against neighbouring Finland and with the Moscow Peace Treaty in 1940 gained some territories, including the Karelian Isthmus. Their Karelian population was hastily evacuated to inner Finland and later replaced with people from other parts of the Soviet Union. A small part of the territory (the municipalities of Kanneljärvi, Koivisto and Rautu) was incorporated into Leningrad Oblast, the rest being included within the Karelo-Finnish Soviet Socialist Republic.

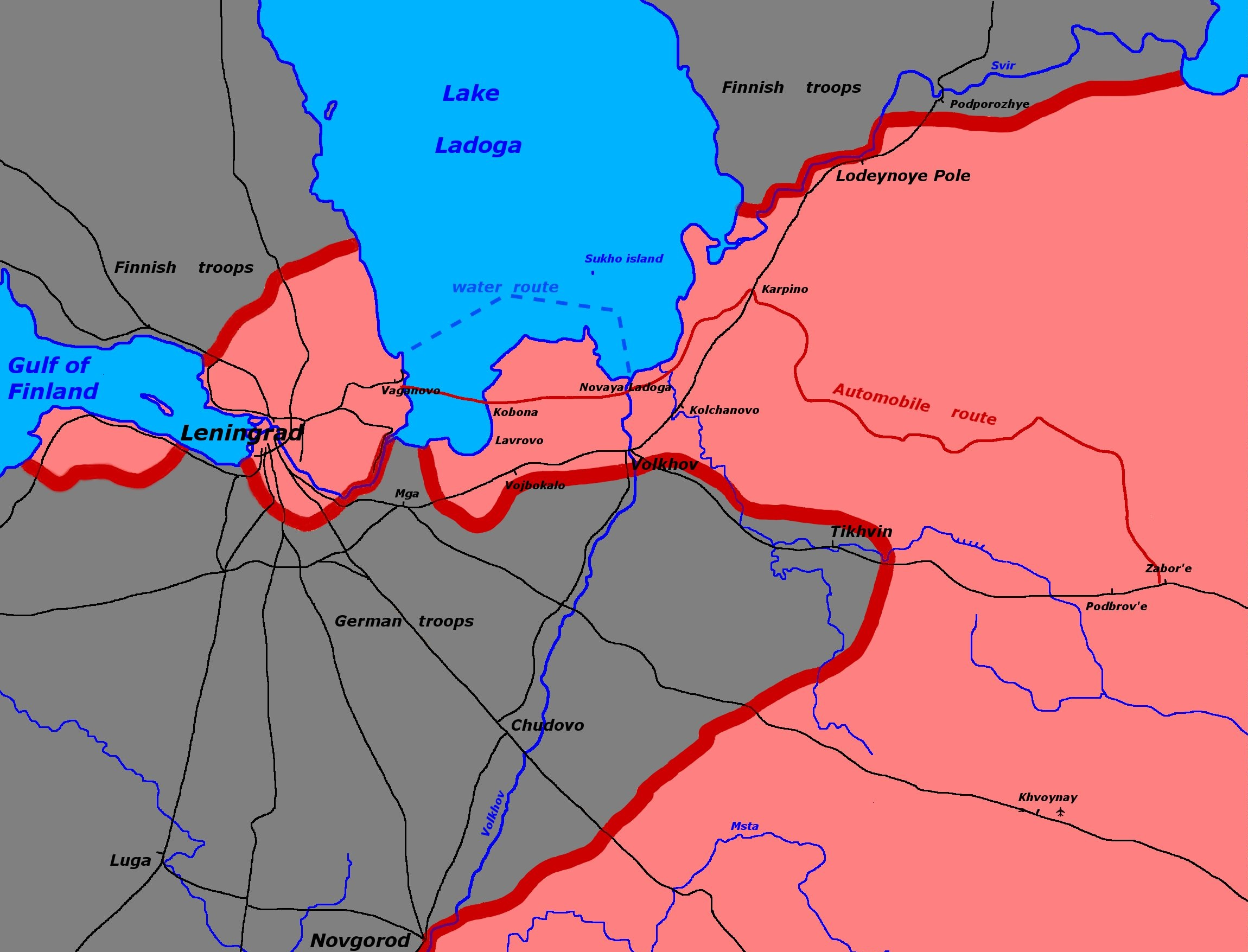
Map showing the Axis occupation of Leningrad Oblast by the end of 1941

In 1941, Germany invaded the Soviet Union in Operation Barbarossa, and shortly thereafter the territory became the site of the Battle of Leningrad. The Wehrmacht captured the southwestern part of the oblast and reached Tikhvin in the east, while Finnish troops quickly recaptured the ceded territories in the Continuation War, encircling Leningrad from the land. In 1944 Soviet offensives managed to expel the Wehrmacht and put military pressure on Finland, which ceded the Karelian Isthmus again in the Moscow Armistice of September 19, 1944. This time the newly acquired territories on the isthmus were incorporated into the Leningrad Oblast (Vyborgsky and Priozersky Districts). In 1947 the territorial gains were confirmed with the Paris Peace Treaty. Novgorod and Pskov Oblasts were formed out of the southern parts of Leningrad Oblast in 1944. In January 1945 a small part of the Estonian SSR to the east of the River Narva with the town of Jaanilinn (now Ivangorod) was transferred to the Russian SFSR and incorporated into Leningrad Oblast. Since then, the territory of Leningrad Oblast has not changed significantly, although some suburbs of Leningrad (now Saint Petersburg) have been excluded from the oblast and incorporated into the city. In October 1946 Leningrad gained from the oblast some former Finnish territories along the northern coast of the Gulf of Finland divided into Sestroretsky District and Kurortny District, including the town of Terijoki.

In 1953, Pavlovsky District of the oblast was abolished, and parts of its territory including Pavlovsk were made subordinate to Leningrad. In 1954 the settlements Levashovo, Pargolovo and Pesochny were also transferred to Leningrad. In 1956 Boksitogorsky District of Leningrad Oblast gained a small territory of Novgorod Oblast. Uritsk was transferred from the oblast to the city of Leningrad in 1963, Krasnoye Selo and several settlements nearby—in 1973, Lomonosov—in 1978.

After a referendum in 1991, the city of Leningrad was renamed back to Saint Petersburg, but Leningrad Oblast retained its name. On 13 June 1996, Leningrad Oblast, alongside Tver Oblast and Saint Petersburg, signed a power-sharing agreement with the federal government, granting it autonomy. This agreement was later abolished on 18 April 2002.

== Demographics ==
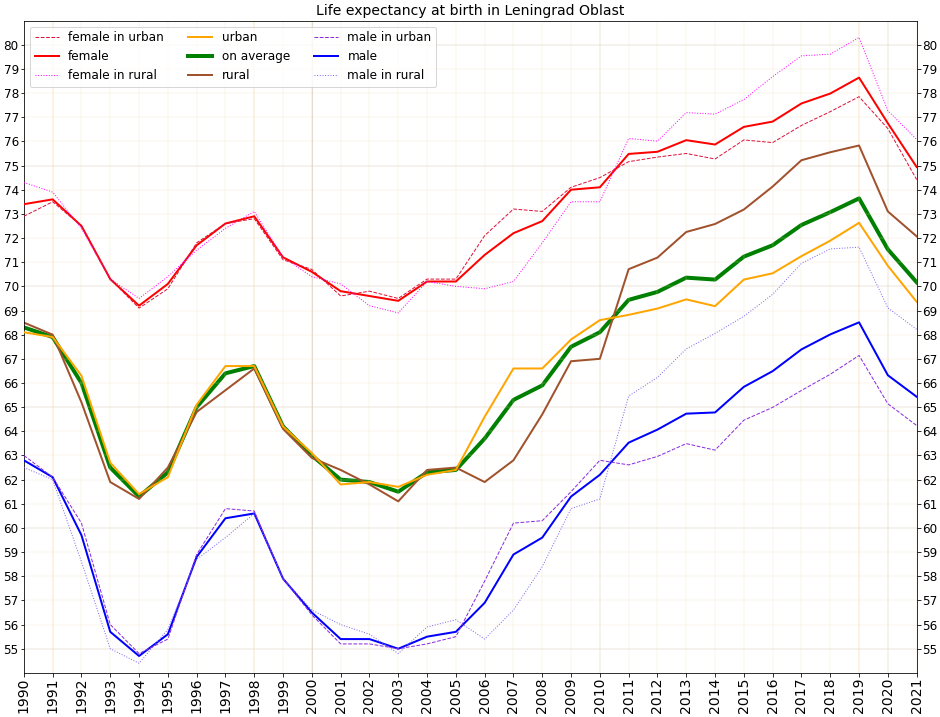
Life expectancy at birth in Leningrad Oblast

Population: 2,000,997 (2021 census); 1,716,868 (2010 census); 1,669,205 (2002 census); 1,661,173 (1989 Soviet census).

Historical population
Year	Pop.	±%
1959	1,244,991	—
1970	1,435,729	+15.3%
1979	1,519,165	+5.8%
1989	1,661,173	+9.3%
2002	1,669,205	+0.5%
2010	1,716,868	+2.9%
2021	2,000,997	+16.5%
Source: Census data

Vital statistics for 2024:

- Births: 11,840 (5.8 per 1,000)
- Deaths: 22,300 (11.0 per 1,000)

Total fertility rate (2024):
0.89 children per woman

Life expectancy (2021):
Total — 70.17 years (male — 65.43, female — 74.94)

Ethnic composition (2021)

Ethnic group	Population	Percentage
Russians	1,642,897	93.7%
Ukrainians	12,905	0.5%
Uzbeks	7,797	0.4%
Belarusians	7,527	0.4%
Tatars	6,805	0.4%
Armenians	6,182	0.4%
Tajiks	4,896	0.3%
Azerbaijanis	3,814	0.2%
Kyrgyz	2,004	0.1%
Finns	2,004	0.1%
Others	58,019	3.6%
Ethnicity not stated	248,151	—

Largest cities or towns in Leningrad Oblast 2021 Russian Census
Rank		Administrative Division	Pop.
1	Gatchina	Gatchinsky District	94,377
2	Murino	Vsevolozhsky District	89,083
3	Vsevolozhsk	Vsevolozhsky District	79,038
4	Vyborg	Vyborgsky District	72,530
5	Sosnovy Bor	Town of oblast significance of Sosnovy Bor	65,367
6	Kudrovo	Vsevolozhsky District	60,791
7	Tikhvin	Tikhvinsky District	55,415
8	Kirishi	Kirishsky District	51,028
9	Kingisepp	Kingiseppsky District	49,716
10	Volkhov	Volkhovsky District	38,511

Religion

Religion in Leningrad Oblast as of 2012 (Sreda Arena Atlas)
Russian Orthodoxy	55.1%
Other Orthodox	0.6%
Old Believers	0.6%
Other Christians	4.1%
Islam	0.7%
Rodnovery and other native faiths	0.6%
Spiritual but not religious	20.2%
Atheism and irreligion	8.5%
Other and undeclared	9.6%

According to a 2012 survey 55.1% of the population of Leningrad Oblast adheres to the Russian Orthodox Church, 4% are unaffiliated generic Christians, 1% are Muslims, 1% of the population adheres to the Slavic native faith (Rodnovery), 1% are Old Believers. In addition, 20% of the population declared to be "spiritual but not religious", 8% is atheist, and 9.9% follows other religions or did not give an answer to the question.

== Politics ==
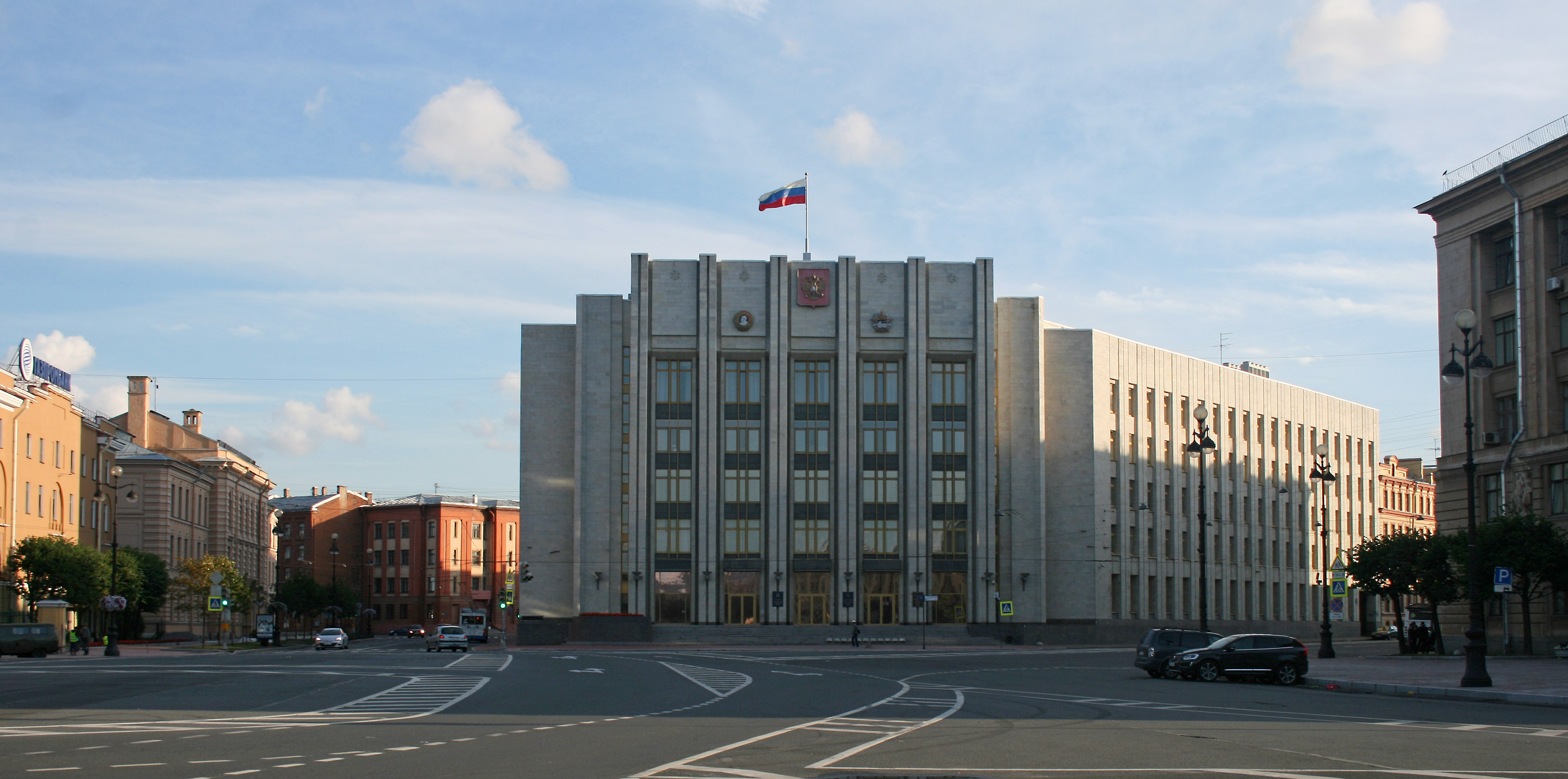
The building of the Government and the Legislative Assembly of the region on Proletarian Dictatorship Square in Saint Petersburg

State power in the region is exercised on the basis of the Charter, which was adopted on 27 October 1994.

The highest official of the region is the governor, who is elected for a term of five years. Since 28 May 2012, he has been Aleksandr Drozdenko.

The executive power in the region is exercised by the administration, which includes:

- The government of the Leningrad Oblast is the highest executive body of state power, which includes the Governor (Chairman of the Government), vice-governors and chairmen of committees
- sectoral, territorial and other executive authorities

Legislative power in the region is exercised by the Legislative Assembly of Leningrad Oblast, which consists of 50 deputies elected by the region's inhabitants according to a mixed proportional-majority system for a term of 5 years. In 2016, the Legislative Assembly of the sixth convocation was formed, in which there are 4 factions: United Russia (40 deputies), A Just Russia (3 deputies), Communist Party of the Russian Federation (3 deputies), Liberal Democratic Party of Russia (4 deputies). The Chairman of the Legislative Assembly is Sergei Bebenin.

=== First secretaries of the Leningrad Oblast CPSU Committee ===
In the period when they were the most important authority in the oblast (1927 to 1991), the following first secretaries were appointed,

- 1927-1934 Sergey Mironovich Kirov, assassinated
- 1934-1945 Andrey Andreyevich Zhdanov
- 1945-1946 Alexey Alexandrovich Kuznetsov, subsequently executed
- 1946-1949 Pyotr Sergeyevich Popkov, subsequently executed
- 1949-1953 Vasily Mikhaylovich Andrianov
- 1953-1957 Frol Romanovich Kozlov
- 1957-1962 Ivan Vasilyevich Spiridonov
- 1962-1970 Vasily Sergeyevich Tolstikov
- 1970-1983 Grigory Vasilyevich Romanov
- 1983-1985 Lev Nikolayevich Zaykov
- 1985-1989 Yury Filippovich Solovyov
- 1989-1991 Boris Veniaminovich Gidaspov

=== Governors ===
Since 1991, governors were sometimes appointed, and sometimes elected,

- 1991-1996 Alexander Semyonovich Belyakov, head of the administration, appointed;
- 1996-1998 Vadim Anatolyevich Gustov, governor, elected;
- 1998-2012 Valery Pavlovich Serdyukov, governor, elected, then appointed;
- 2012- Aleksandr Yuryevich Drozdenko, appointed.

== Administrative divisions ==
Administratively, Leningrad Oblast is divided into seventeen districts and one town of oblast significance (Sosnovy Bor). In terms of area, the largest administrative district is Podporozhsky (7,706 square kilometers (2,975 sq mi)), and the smallest is Lomonosovsky (1,919 square kilometers (741 sq mi)).

Lomonosovsky District is the only district in Russia that has its administrative center (the town of Lomonosov) located within a different federal subject. While the district is a part of Leningrad Oblast, Lomonosov is located within the federal city of Saint Petersburg.

== Economy ==
=== Industry ===
The oblast, particularly the areas adjacent to Saint Petersburg, is heavily industrialized. The major enterprises include the oil refinery in Kirishi, the Ford car assembly plant, Hyundai Russia assembly plant and the Rexam PLC Beverage Can Europe and Asia packaging plant in Vsevolozhsk, the paper mill in Syssstroy, and the paper mill and the plant producing oil platforms in Vyborg, and the Tikhvin industrial site in Tikhvin.

=== Agriculture ===
The main agricultural specializations of the oblast are cattle breeding with meat and milk production and poultry production. The main agricultural lands are in the east and in the southwest of the oblast.

=== Transportation ===
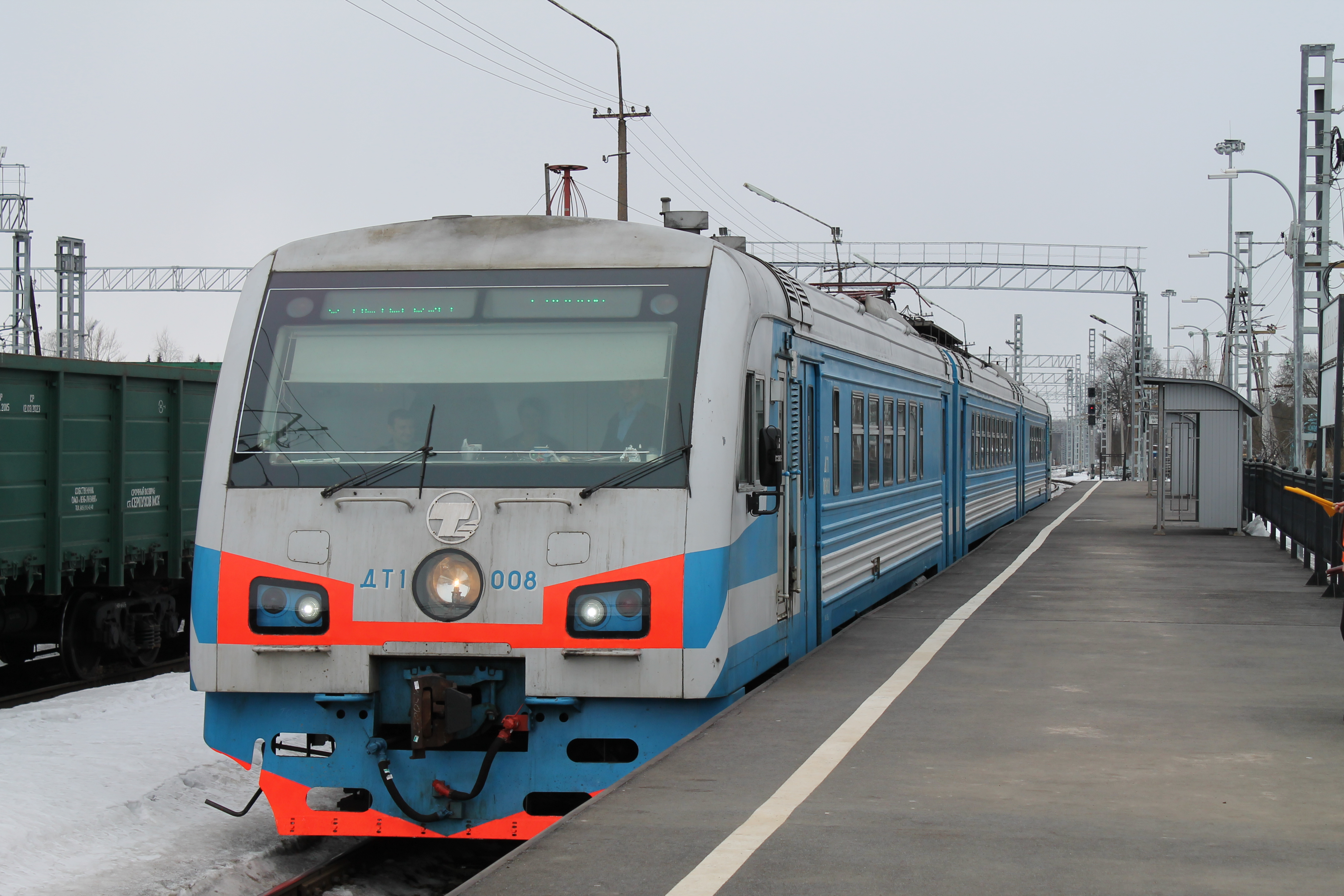
DT1 multiple unit Diesel train in Veymarn

Saint-Petersburg is a major railway hub, and all railways running to it cross also Leningrad Oblast. They connect Saint-Petersburg with Moscow (Saint Petersburg – Moscow Railway), Helsinki via Vyborg, Murmansk via Petrozavodsk, Sortavala via Priozersk, Tallinn via Kingisepp, Riga via Pskov, Vitebsk via Dno, and Veliky Novgorod. There is a network of railways at the Karelian Isthmus, in particular, connecting Vyborg and Priozersk, as well as south of Saint-Petersburg. There also railway lines connecting Veymarn with Slantsy, Veymarn with Petergof via Sosnovy Bor, Mga with Sonkovo via Kirishi, Volkhov with Vologda via Tikhvin and Cherepovets, Volkhov with Chudovo, and Lodeynoye Pole with Sortavala via Olonets. Most of them support intensive passenger and cargo traffic.

Paved roads well cover the western and the central parts of Leningrad Oblast. The M10 highway connects Saint Petersburg with Moscow via Veliky Novgorod in the south and with the Finnish border, continuing across the border to Helsinki, in the north. It is split between European routes E18 (Saint Petersburg to Finland) and E105 (Saint Petersburg to Moscow), and much of it within the oblast is built as a dual carriageway. R21 highway (also part of E105) runs from Saint Petersburg to Murmansk via Petrozavodsk, and A180 (part of E20) connects Saint Petersburg with Ivangorod and continues across the Estonian border to Tallinn. R23 connects Saint Petersburg with Pskov; it is a part of the E95. A114 runs to Vologda via Cherepovets. A paid motorway between Saint Petersburg and Moscow and the new A121 from Saint-Petersburg to Sortavala, around the Western coast of Ladoga are under construction. Roads are well served by bus traffic.

The Luga, the Svir, the Volkhov, and the Neva are all navigable and heavily user for cargo transport, however, there is no scheduled passenger navigation within the oblast, except for seasonal leisure river cruises from Saint-Petersburg. The Onega Canal, shared with Vologda Oblast, serves as a bypass of Lake Onega from the south. Similarly, the Ladoga Canal bypasses Lake Ladoga from the east, from the Svir to the Neva. It is a part of the Volga–Baltic Waterway. In contrast, the Tikhvinskaya water system, connecting the Syas and the Mologa, which provided access from the Ladoga to the river basin of the Volga, is disused. The trans-border Saimaa Canal connects Lake Saimaa in Finland with the Gulf of Finland, has special status, and is occasionally used for passenger navigation.

Ust-Luga, Vyborg, Vysotsk, and Primorsk are the major sea terminals on the Gulf of Finland.

There is a number of airfields in Leningrad oblast that are now used only by the general aviation. Scheduled and international flights are available exclusively from Pulkovo airport in Saint-Petersburg.

=== Energy ===
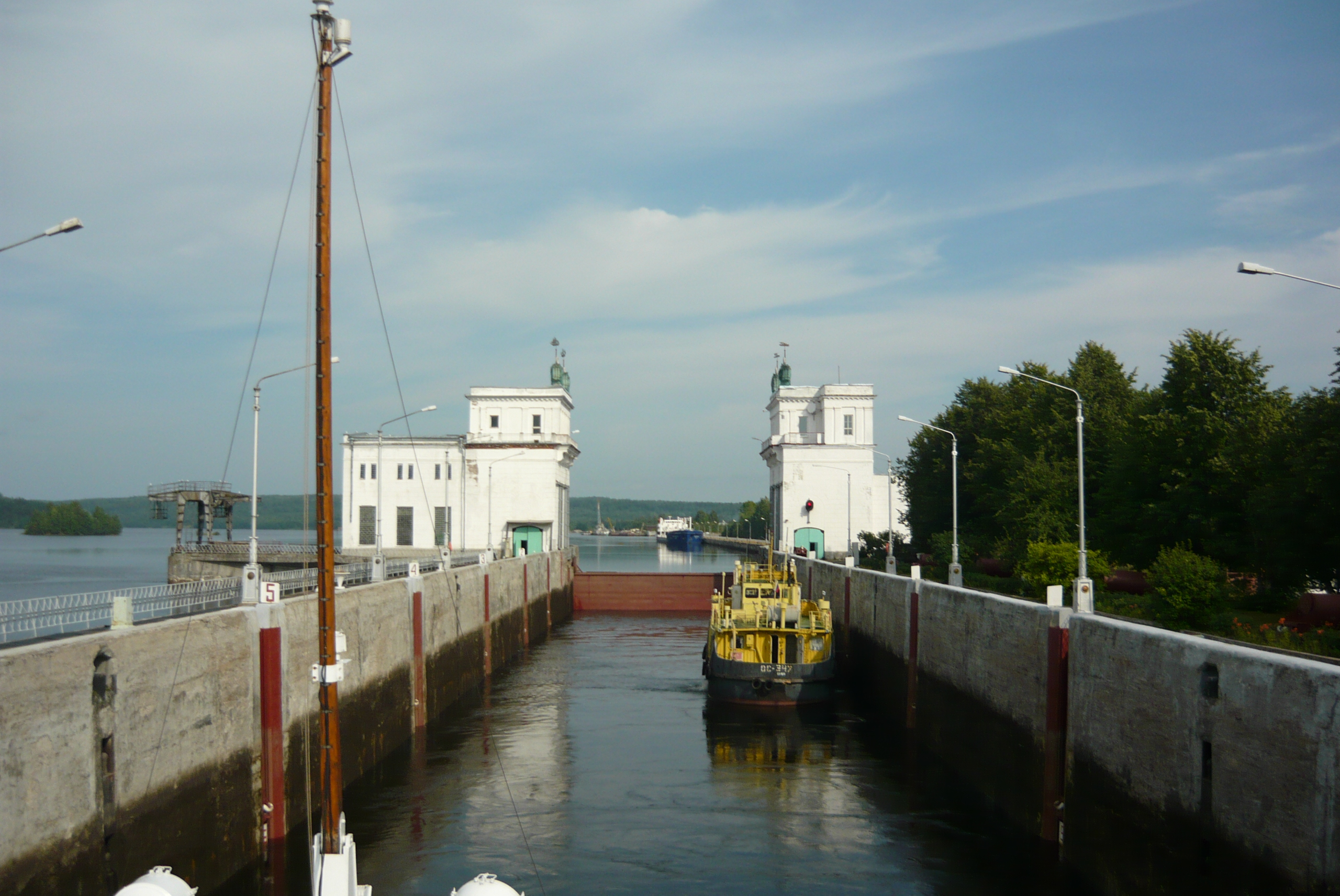
Lock at the Upper Svir Hydroelectric Station.

The Leningrad Nuclear Power Plant is located in the city of Sosnovy Bor. There are four major hydroelectric plants in the oblast. The Volkhov Hydroelectric Station, on the Volkhov River, was constructed in 1921 and became the first major hydropower station in the Soviet Union. The others are the Upper Svir Hydroelectric Station and the Lower Svir Hydroelectric Station, both on the Svir River, and the Narva Hydroelectric Station on the Narva River.

=== Science and technology ===
There are many science and high-tech institutions around Saint Petersburg, some of which are located in the oblast. For example, Gatchina is the site of the Petersburg Nuclear Physics Institute and Sosnovy Bor hosts the Research Institute of Optical and Electronic Devices.

== Culture and recreation ==
=== Architecture ===
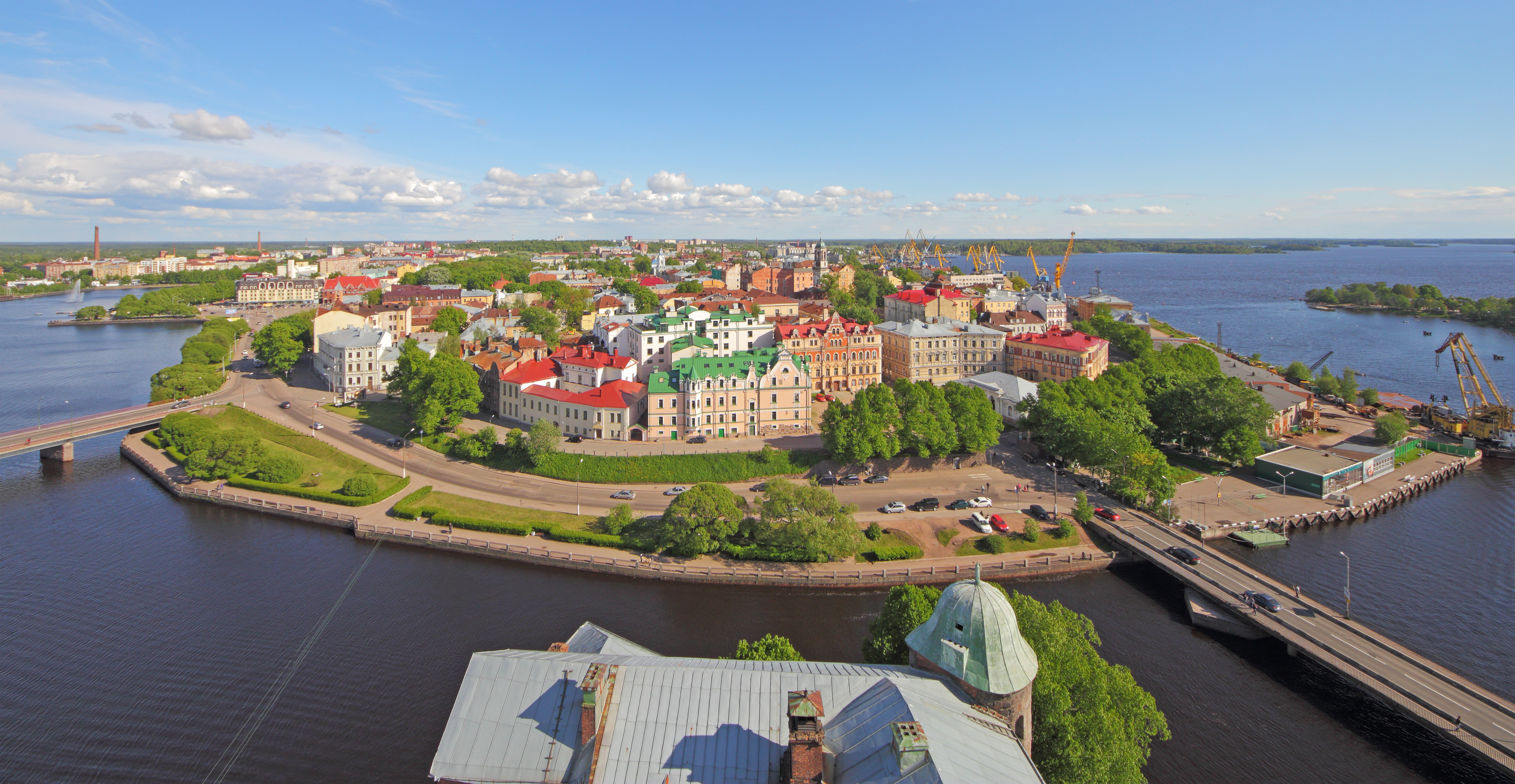
The historical center of Vyborg

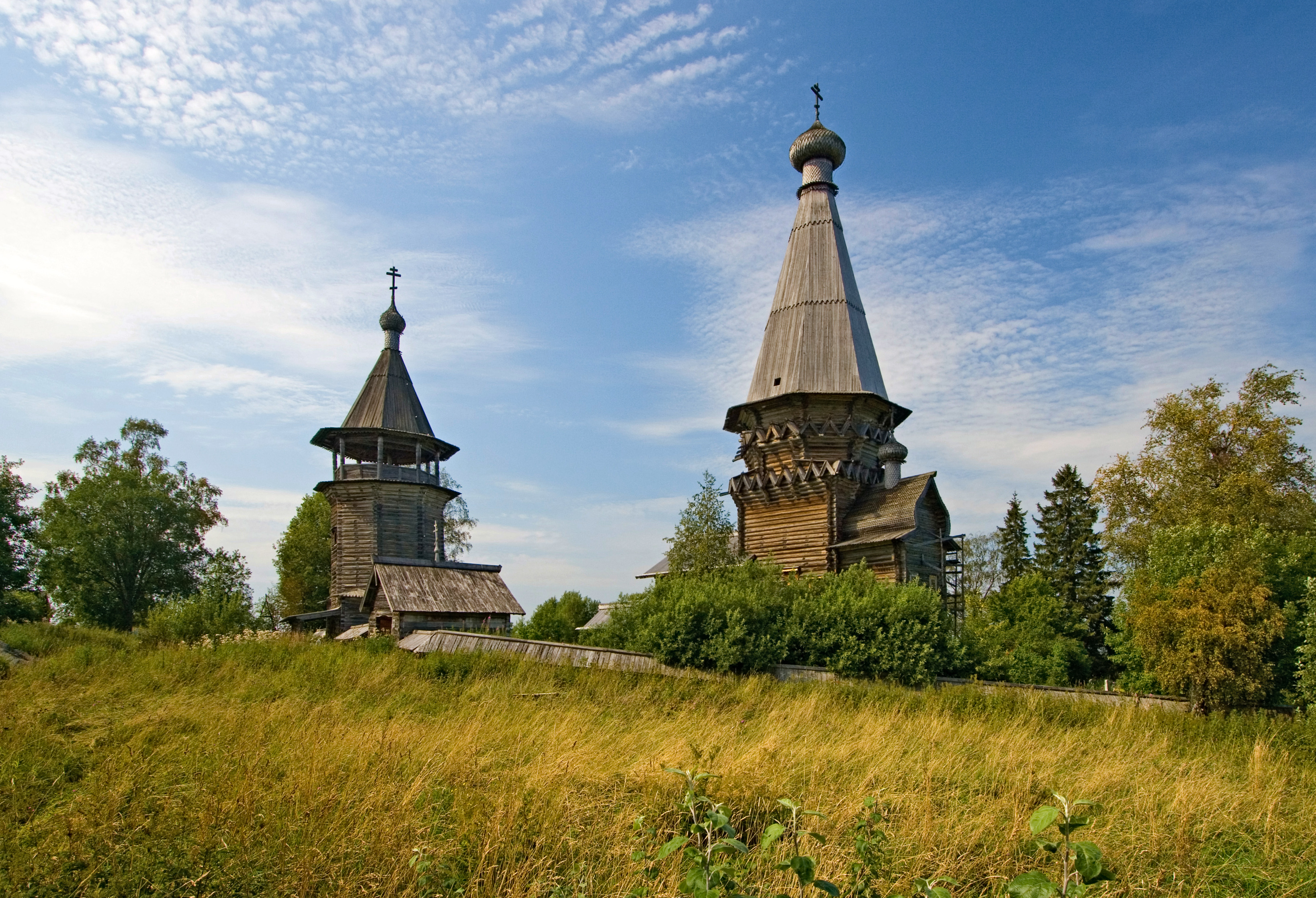
The Gimreka Ensemble

Since prehistory, the Volkhov and the Neva Rivers were constituents of major trade routes, and archaeological sites dot their banks. Staraya Ladoga has many pre-1700 sites, including two of about a couple of dozens standing pre-Mongol churches in Russia. Both of them were built in the 1160s. The Oreshek Fortress in Shlisselburg and the Koporye Fortress, both built in the 14th century, and the Ivangorod Fortress, originally built in 1492, are excellent examples of Russian fortification art. Podporozhsky District contains the best samples of wooden ecclesiastical architecture in Leningrad Oblast, some of which are collectively referred to as Podporozhye Ring: The Resurrection Church in the settlement of Vazhiny, the Saint Nicholas Church in the village of Soginitsy, the Sts Peter and Paul Chapel in the village of Zaozerye, and the Saint Athanasy chapel in the village of Posad. The two other notable wooden churches are located in the villages of Gimreka and Shcheleyki close to the Onega Lakeshore. The center of Vyborg preserves many examples of medieval Swedish architecture, unique for Russia.

After Saint Petersburg was founded in 1703, many estates and residences were founded around the city. Some of them still stand and are listed as World Heritage sites, aggregated into the site of Historic Centre of Saint Petersburg and Related Groups of Monuments. includes, among others, estates in Gostilitsy, Ropsha, and Taytsy.

Localities in the Karelian Isthmus preserve some fine inter-war Finnish architecture. The best-known example is the Viipuri Municipal Library by Alvar Aalto.

== Twin regions ==
- Aarhus Municipality, Denmark
- South Chungcheong Province, South Korea
- Kyoto Prefecture, Japan
- Lombardy, Italy
- Lower Silesian Voivodeship, Poland
- Nordland, Norway (from 1987)
- Córdoba, Argentina (from 1997)
