= Nestori Kaasalainen =

Finnish politician

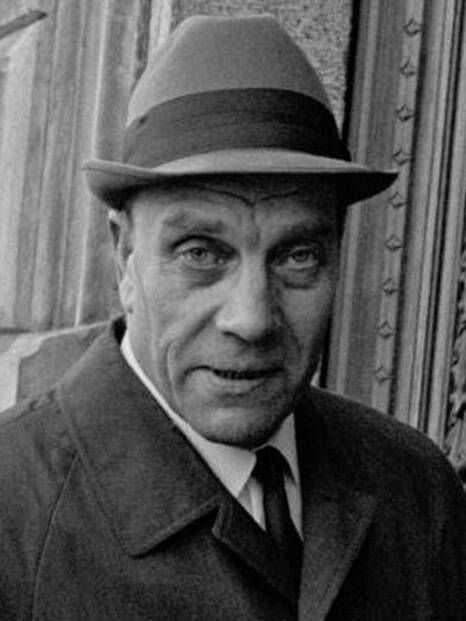
- Kaasalainen in 1967

Minister of Agriculture
- In office 27 May 1966 – 21 March 1968
- Preceded by: Mauno Jussila
- Succeeded by: Martti Miettunen
- In office 15 July 1970 – 28 February 1971
- Preceded by: Nils Westermarck
- Succeeded by: Samuli Suomela

Minister of Agriculture and Forestry
- In office 1 March 1971 – 28 October 1971
- Preceded by: Nils Westermarck
- Succeeded by: Samuli Suomela

Personal details
- Born: 14 February 1915 Pyhäjärvi, Finland
- Died: 1 March 2016 (aged 101) Sipoo, Finland
- Party: Agrarian League

Nestor Johannes "Nestori" Kaasalainen (14 February 1915 – 1 March 2016) was a Finnish politician who served twice as Finland's Minister of Agriculture, whose active career spanned the 1950s and 1960s. He was elected from his home town of Tyrvää (later Vammala, the six rural union (later Keskustan) parliamentary district, he represented the northern election of Turku county. After his career as a member of parliament, he moved from 1972 to 1980 as an administrative director and member of the board of directors at Alko.

Kaasalainen died in Sipoo on 1 March 2016 at the age of 101.
