= Murino, Leningrad Oblast =

Town in Leningrad Oblast, Russia

Murino Мурино
- Town
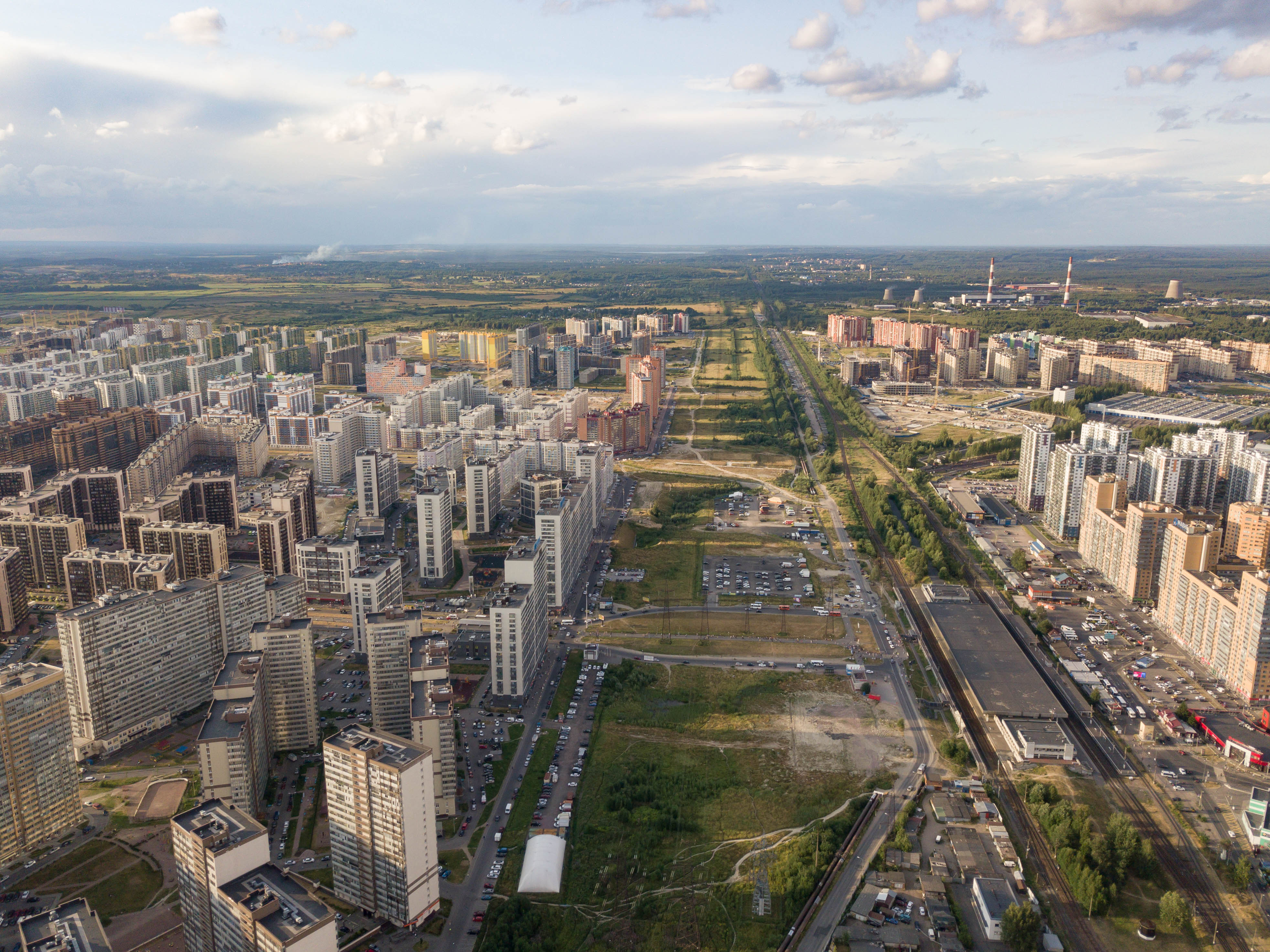

- Flag Coat of arms
- Interactive map of Murino
- Location of Murino Murino (European Russia) Murino (Europe)
- Coordinates: 60°02′45″N 30°27′05″E
- Country: Russia
- Federal subject: Leningrad Oblast
- Administrative district: Vsevolozhsky District
- First mentioned: 1676
- Town status since: 2019

Area
  - Total: 13.36 km^{2} (5.16 sq mi)
- Elevation: 24.2 m (79 ft)

Population
  - Estimate (2025): 64,939 )
- Postal code: 188662
- Dialing code: +7 81370

Murino (Russian: Мурино [ˈmurʲɪnə]) is a town in Vsevolozhsky District of Leningrad Oblast, Russia, located east of and immediately adjacent to the city of St. Petersburg. Formerly a settlement, it was granted a town status on 27 March 2019. The population of Murino is about 89,000 people.

Historical population
Year	Pop.	±%
1897	704	—
1926	968	+37.5%
1939	2,107	+117.7%
2002	5,002	+137.4%
2010	7,023	+40.4%
2021	89,083	+1168.4%
Source: Census data

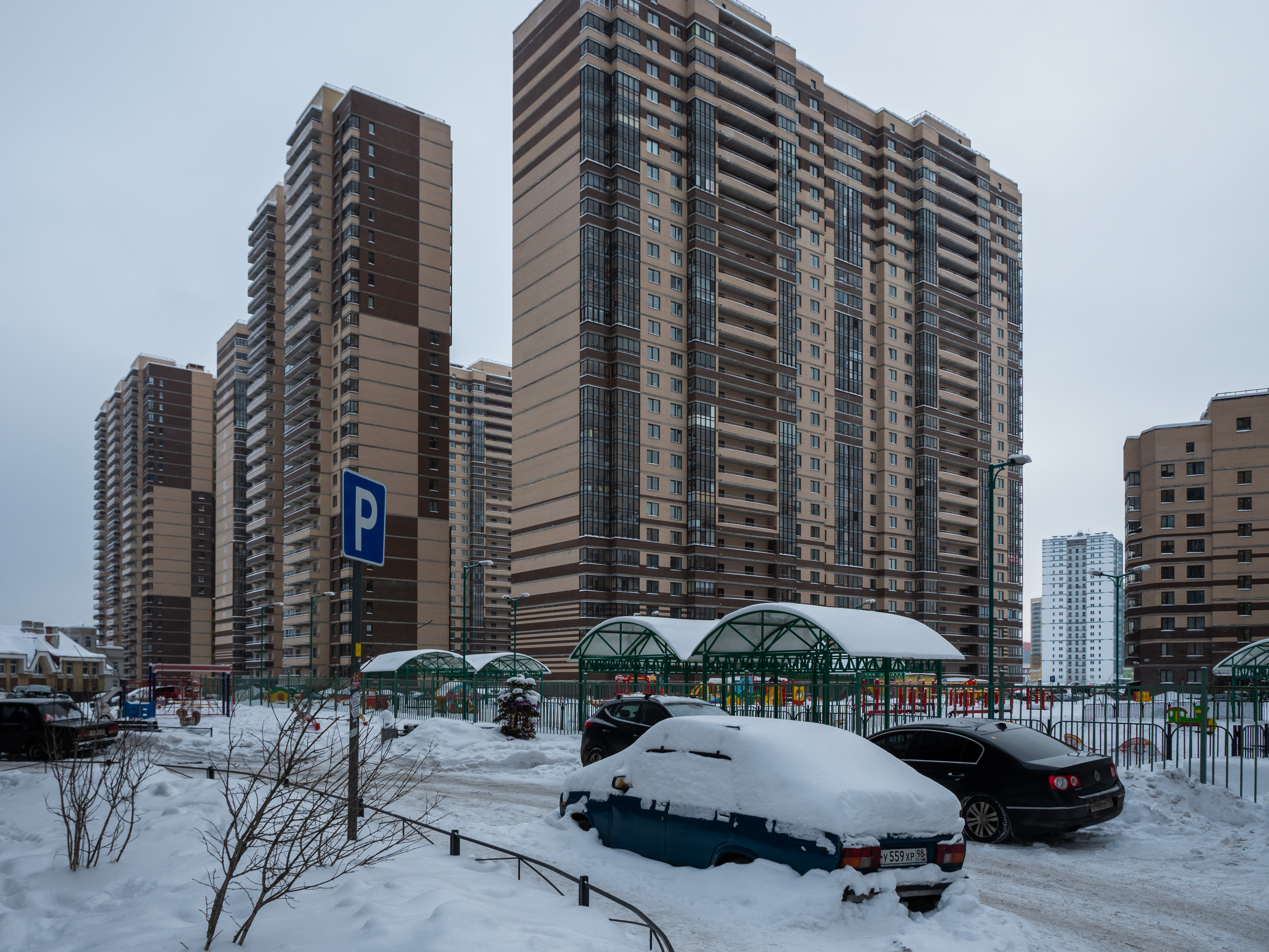
Typical Murino apartments

== Administrative and municipal status ==
Within the framework of administrative divisions, it is incorporated, together with the village of Lavriki, within Vsevolozhsky District as Murinskoye Settlement Municipal Formation. As a municipal division, Murinskoye Settlement Municipal Formation is incorporated within Vsevolozhsky Municipal District as Murinskoye Urban Settlement.

== Economy ==
=== Transportation ===
Devyatkino station, a metro station of the Saint Petersburg Metro, and the eponymous railway station, are located in Murino. The railway line, Saint Petersburg–Hiitola railway, connects Finland Station of Saint Petersburg with Priozersk via Sosnovo. Murino railway station is on the same line but it is located in Saint Petersburg rather than in Murino.

The Saint Petersburg Ring Road crosses the southern part of Murino and has two exits within the city limits. Murino, being adjacent to the city of Saint Petersburg, is integrated into its road network. It does not have direct connections with Vsevolozhsk, the district center, and connection proceeds via the Ring Road.
