= Nils Westermarck =

Finnish economist and politician (1910–2002)

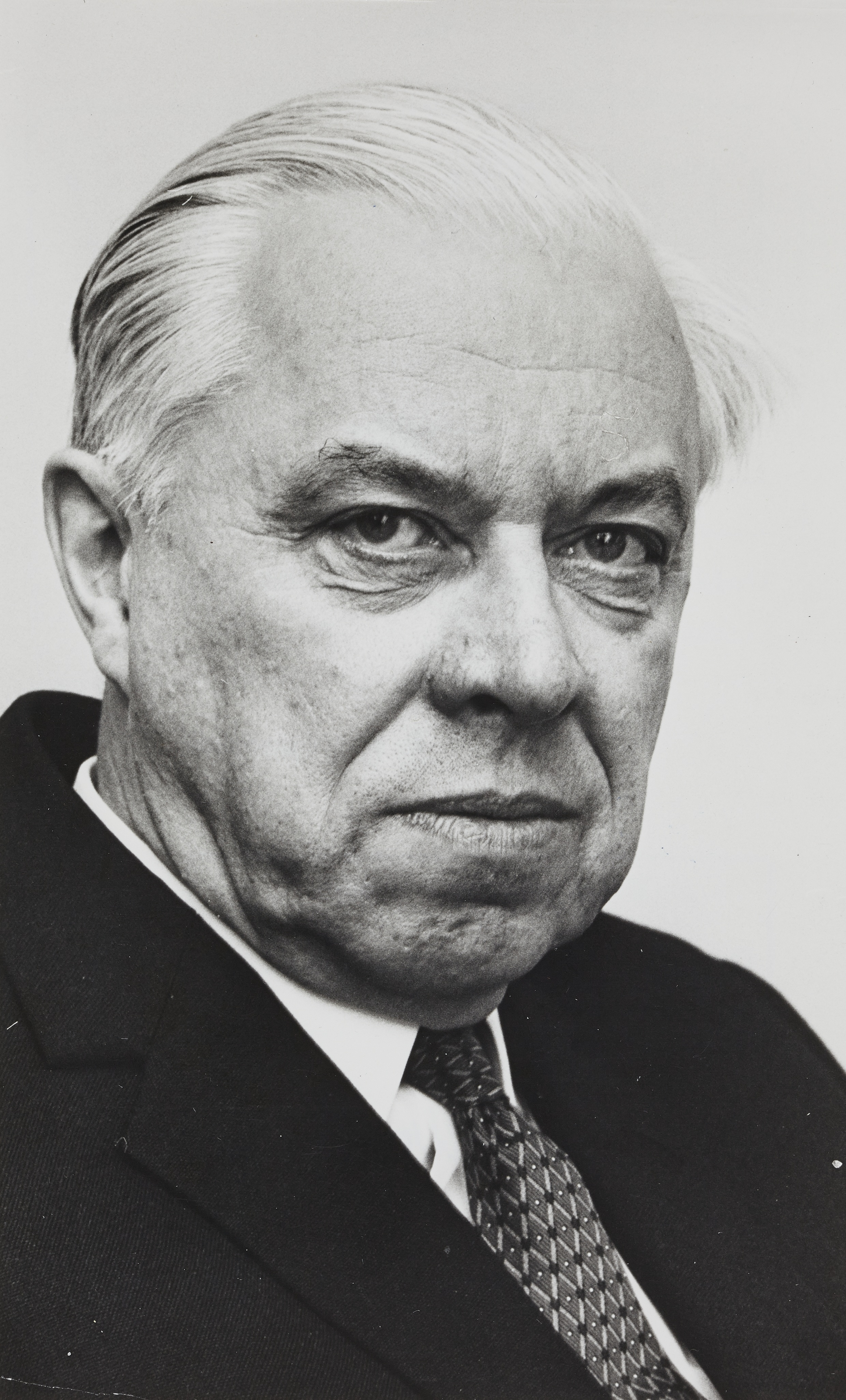
Nils Westermarck in 1980s.

Nils Christian Westermarck (14 July 1910 Helsinki – 17 March 2002 Espoo) was a Finnish agricultural economist and politician.

Westermarck received his PhD in 1940 from the University of Helsinki, the Faculty of Agriculture and Forestry. During the Continuation War, Westermarck worked at the Ministry of Agriculture and after the war he became a professor at the Swedish University of Agricultural Sciences in Umeå. In 1949, he returned to Finland and became the Professor of Agricultural Economics at the University of Helsinki. He remained in this position until his retirement in 1973.

In 1953–1954 and again in 1970, Westermarck was the Minister of Agriculture and Forestry. In 1960, he received the honorary title of Academician from the President of Finland, Urho Kekkonen.

He was the Deputy Director of the International Federation of Agricultural Producers between 1955 and 1958. During 1961–1970, Westermarck was the Director of the International Association of Agricultural Economists. The Association's triennial conference's prize for the best poster is named after him.
