= Valery Serdyukov =

Russian politician

- Валерий Сердюков
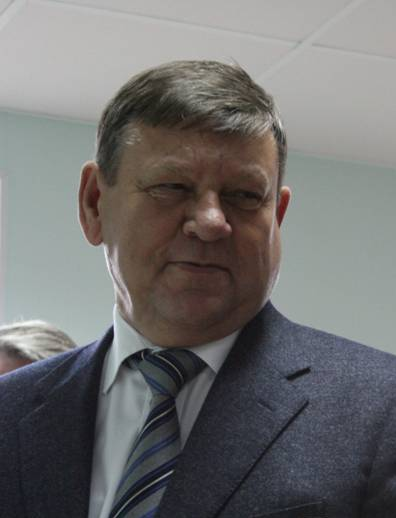
- Serdyukov in 2008

3rd Governor of Leningrad Oblast
- In office 19 September 1999 – 28 May 2012
- Preceded by: Vadim Gustov
- Succeeded by: Aleksandr Drozdenko

Personal details
- Born: 9 November 1945 (age 80) Kharashouka, Belarusian SSR, Soviet Union
- Party: United Russia

Valery Pavlovich Serdyukov (Russian: Валерий Павлович Сердюков; born 9 November 1945) is a Russian politician who served as Governor of Leningrad Oblast in Russia (1998–2012).

Serdyukov graduated from the Saint Petersburg Mining Institute with a degree in economics.

He was appointed by the oblast governor as vice-governor in charge of industry, energy, and the environment in 1996, made lieutenant governor in December 1997, and served as acting governor since September 18, 1998. Serdyukov was elected governor in 1999 and again in 2003. In 2007, he was reappointed as governor by Vladimir Putin, the then-President of Russia, following a Kremlin-sponsored law which allowed regional governors to be appointed by the president instead of being popularly elected.

In 2012, he was replaced by Alexander Drozdenko as governor.

== Personal life ==
Serdyukov enjoys chess. He is married and has two adult sons and three grandchildren.

== Honours and awards ==
- Order of Merit for the Fatherland 3rd class
- Order of Honour
- Order of Labour Glory 3rd class
- Medal "In Commemoration of the 300th Anniversary of Saint Petersburg"
- Order of Merit (Belarus)
- Order of Merit 3rd class (Ukraine)
- Order of Civil Merit
