= Krasnopolye =

Village in Russia

Krasnopolye Краснополье
- Village
- Location within Bryansk Oblast Location within Russia
- Coordinates: 52°36′N 34°50′E
- Country: Russia
- Region: Bryansk Oblast
- District: Brasovsky District
- Time zone: UTC+3:00

Krasnopolye (Russian: Краснополье) is a rural locality (a village) in Brasovsky District, Bryansk Oblast, Russia. The population was 9 as of 2013. There is one street.

== Geography ==
Krasnopolye is located 22 km east of Lokot (the district's administrative centre) by road. Pozhar is the nearest rural locality.
