= Legislative Assembly of Leningrad Oblast =

Regional parliament of Leningrad Oblast, Russia

Legislative Assembly of Leningrad Oblast Законодательное собрание Ленинградской области
- 7th legislature

Type
- Type: Unicameral

Leadership
- Chairman: Sergey Bebenin, United Russia since 20 June 2012

Structure
- Seats: 50
- Political groups: United Russia (35) CPRF (7); SRZP (5) LDPR (3)

Elections
- Voting system: Mixed
- Last election: 19 September 2021
- Next election: 2026

Meeting place
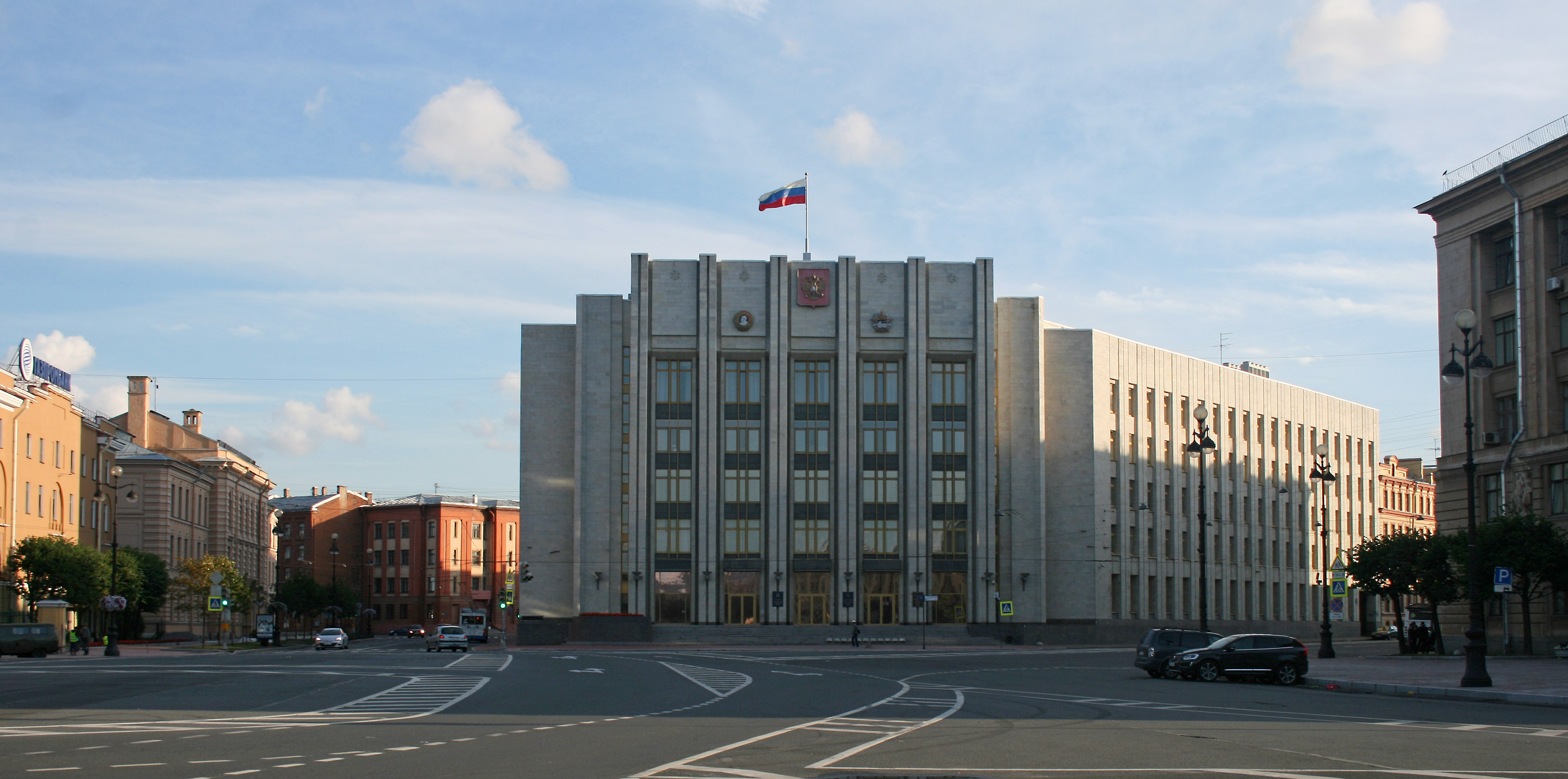
- 67 Suvorovskiy Prospekt, St. Petersburg

Website
- lenoblzaks.ru

The Legislative Assembly of Leningrad Oblast (Russian: Законодательное собрание Ленинградской области) is the regional parliament of Leningrad Oblast, a federal subject of Russia. A total of 50 deputies are elected for five-year terms.

It autonomously exercises its roles using the Constitution of the Russian Federation, federal legislation, the Charter of Leningrad Oblast, and regional laws as guides. The Legislative Assembly is a legal entity. Acts passed by it are binding on all bodies and officials of state authorities and local governments of Leningrad Oblast, organizations, and private citizens.

== Elections ==
=== 2016 ===
Party	%	Seats
United Russia	51.25	40
Liberal Democratic Party of Russia	14.65	4
A Just Russia	12.79	3
Communist Party of the Russian Federation	12.49	3
Yabloko	3.71	0
Rodina	2.26	0
Registered voters/turnout	43.01	

=== 2021 ===
Party	%	Seats
United Russia	46.37	35
Communist Party of the Russian Federation	20.70	7
A Just Russia — For Truth	15.20	5
Liberal Democratic Party of Russia	10.60	3
Yabloko	3.22	0
Registered voters/turnout	43.18	
