= List of dams and reservoirs in Russia =

This page shows the list of notable dams and reservoirs in Russia.

- Baksan Dam
- Boguchany Dam
- Bratsk Dam
- Bureya Dam
- Cheboksary Dam
- Chirkey Dam, Chirkey Reservoir
- Chogray Reservoir
- Gorky Reservoir
- Irganai Dam
- Irkutsk Dam
- Ivankovo Reservoir
- Kama Reservoir
- Krasnoklutchevskaya Dam
- Krasnoyarsk Dam
- Kuybyshev Reservoir
- Lower Svir Dam
- Narva Dam, Narva Reservoir (shared with Estonia)
- Nizhny Novgorod Dam, Gorky_Reservoir
- Nizhnekamsk Dam, Nizhnekamsk Reservoir
- Paatsjoki River Dams
- Pavlovka Dam
- Rybinsk Dam, Rybinsk Reservoir
- Saratov Dam, Saratov Reservoir
- Sayano-Shushenskaya Dam
- Sheksna Reservoir
- Tsimlyansk Reservoir
- Uglich Dam, Uglich Reservoir
- Upper Svir Dam
- Ust-Ilimsk Dam
- Verkhnetulomsky Reservoir
- Veselovsky Reservoir
- Vilyuy Dam
- Volga Dam
- Volkhov Dam
- Votkinsk Dam, Votkinsk Reservoir
- Zagorsk Dams
- Zeya Dam
- Zhiguli Dam

== See also ==
- List of dams and reservoirs
