= Volkhov (disambiguation) =

Volkhov is a town in Volkhovsky District of Leningrad Oblast, Russia.

Volkhov may also refer to:

- Volkhov (inhabited locality), other localities in Russia by this name
- Volkhov (river), a river in north-western Russia
- Volkhov Hydroelectric Station, a hydroelectric station in Russia
- Volkhov Front, a military subdivision of the Red Army in World War II in northwestern Russia
- Soviet battleship Volkhov, an artillery ship of the Soviet Baltic Fleet (1950–1953)
- SA-75 "Volkhov" a Soviet Surface to Air Missile system.

== See also ==
- Volkhv, a priest in pre-Christian Rus'
