= Upper Svir Hydroelectric Station =

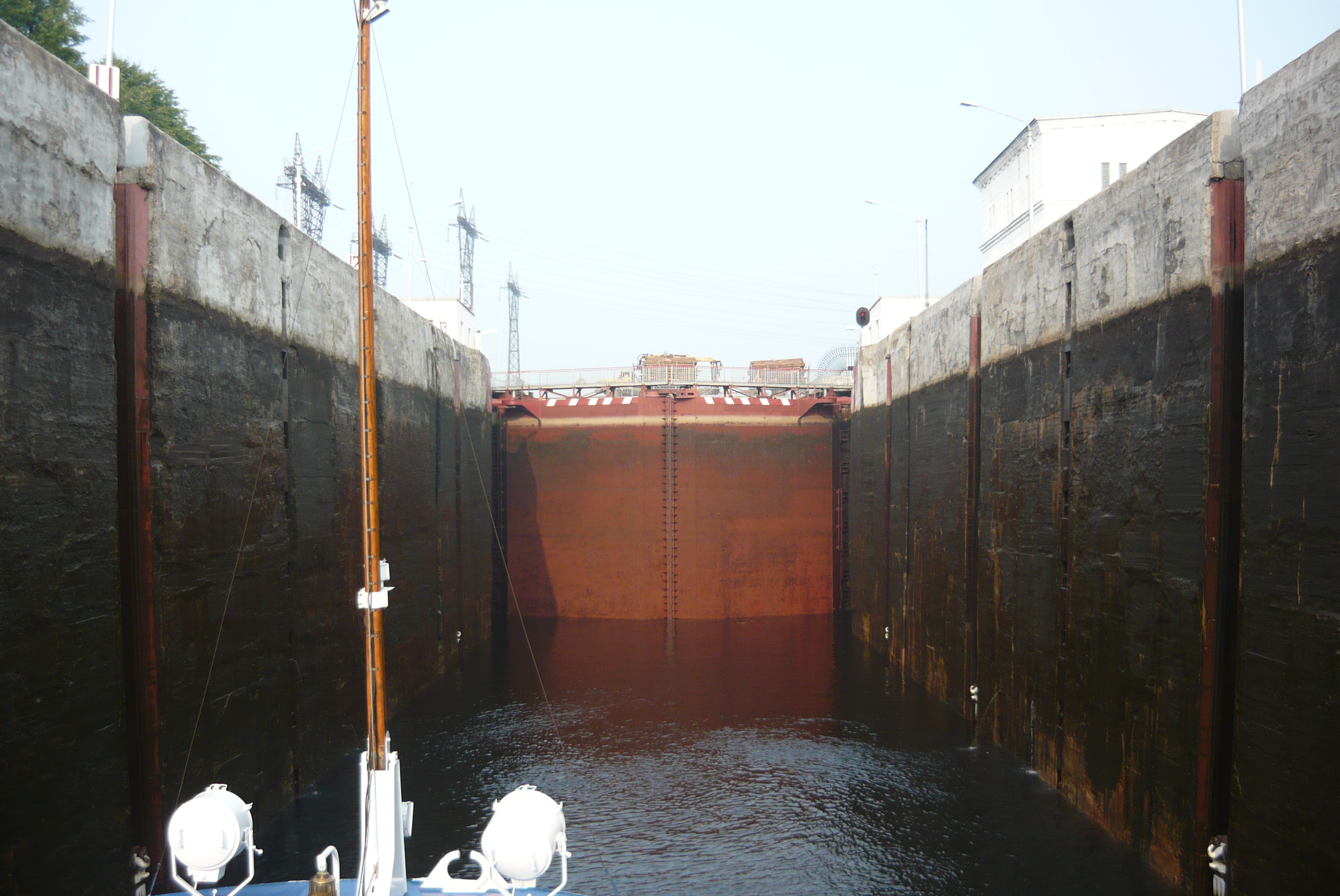
- A lock

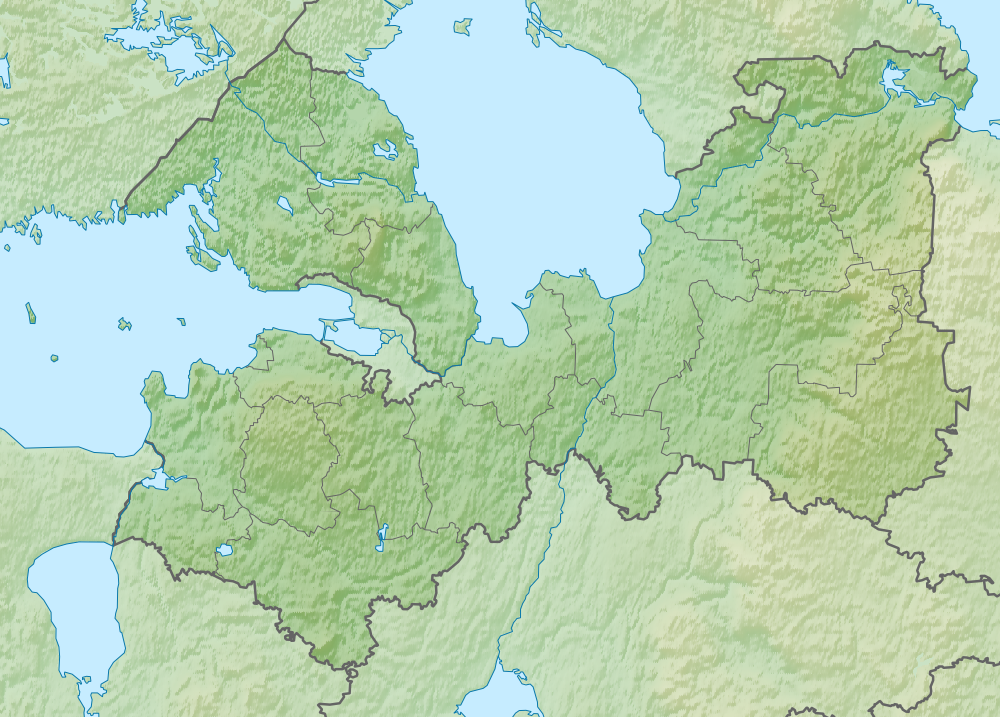
- Location of the Upper Svir Hydroelectric Station in Leningrad Oblast
- Official name: Верхнесвирская ГЭС
- Country: Russia
- Location: Podporozhye, Leningrad Oblast
- Coordinates: 60°55′08″N 34°11′28″E
- Status: Operational
- Construction began: 1936
- Opening date: 1952
- Owner: TGC-1

Dam and spillways
- Impounds: Svir River

Power Station
- Installed capacity: 160 MW
- Annual generation: 548 GWh

Upper Svir Hydroelectric Station (Russian: Верхнесвирская ГЭС) is a hydroelectric station on the Svir River located in the town of Podporozhye, Leningrad Oblast, in northwestern Russia. It was open on February 13, 1952 and has the total power of 160 MW. It is operated by the TGC-1 power company.

The power station contains four turbines, with the power of 40 MW each. The water reservoir formed above the dam is known as Ivinsky Razliv Reservoir. Svir is a part of the Volga–Baltic Waterway, connecting the basins of the Volga and the Neva Rivers, with heavy cargo and cruise traffic. To accommodate the waterway, a lock was built to bypass the dam of the power station.

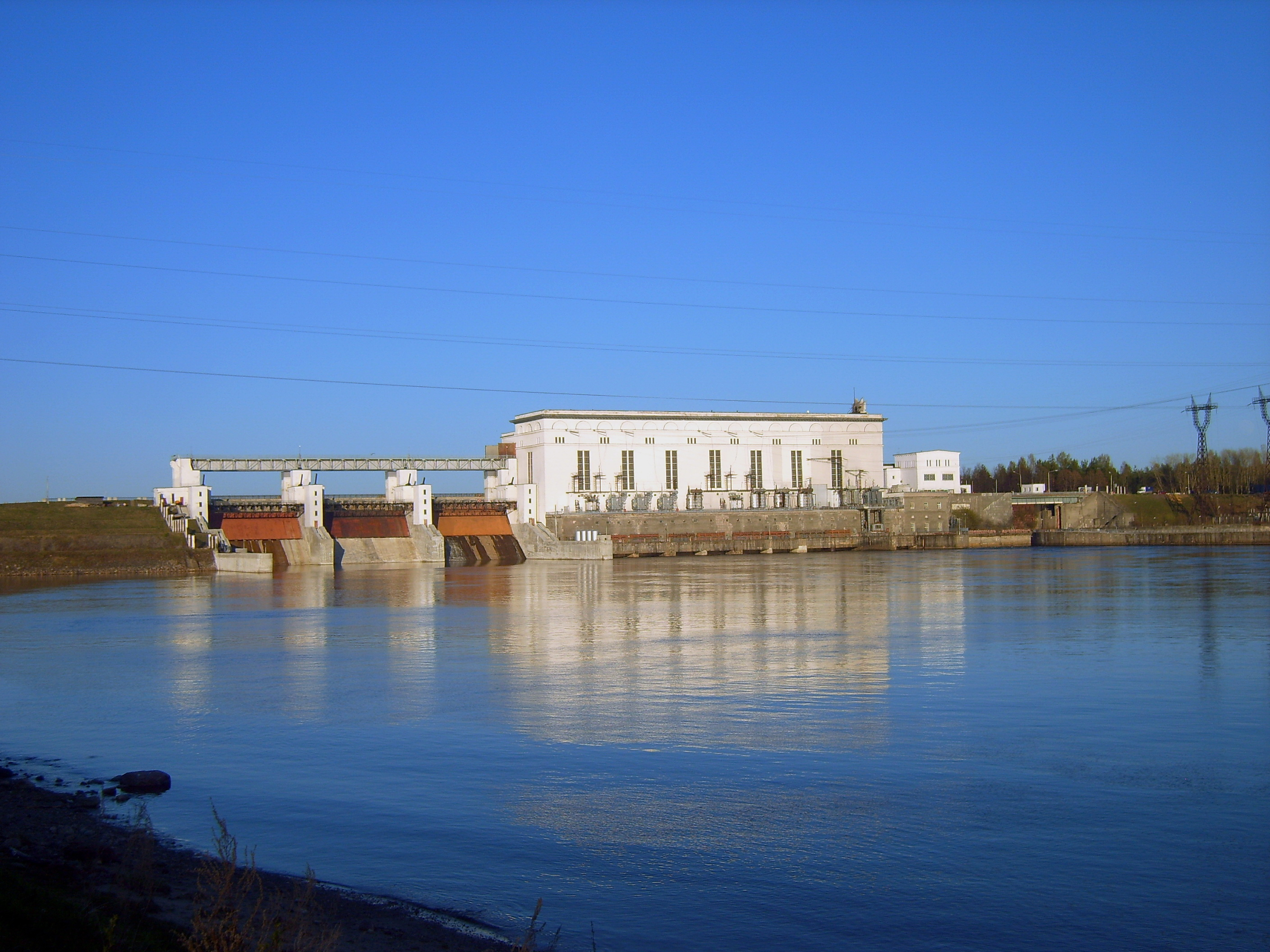
Hydroelectric station in Podporozhye.

The construction of the station started in 1936. At the same time, the construction of the timber production plant in Podporozhye started. The construction areas were served by a dedicated railway line. The construction of the hydroelectric plant was not completed until 1941, when, during World War II, Podporozhye was occupied by Finnish troops until 1944. It was resumed after the war and completed in 1952. Since 1955, the Upper Svir Hydroelectric Station and the Lower Svir Hydroelectric Station, located in Svirstroy, perform coordination and, in particular, jointly regulate the water level in the Svir.

== Gallery ==
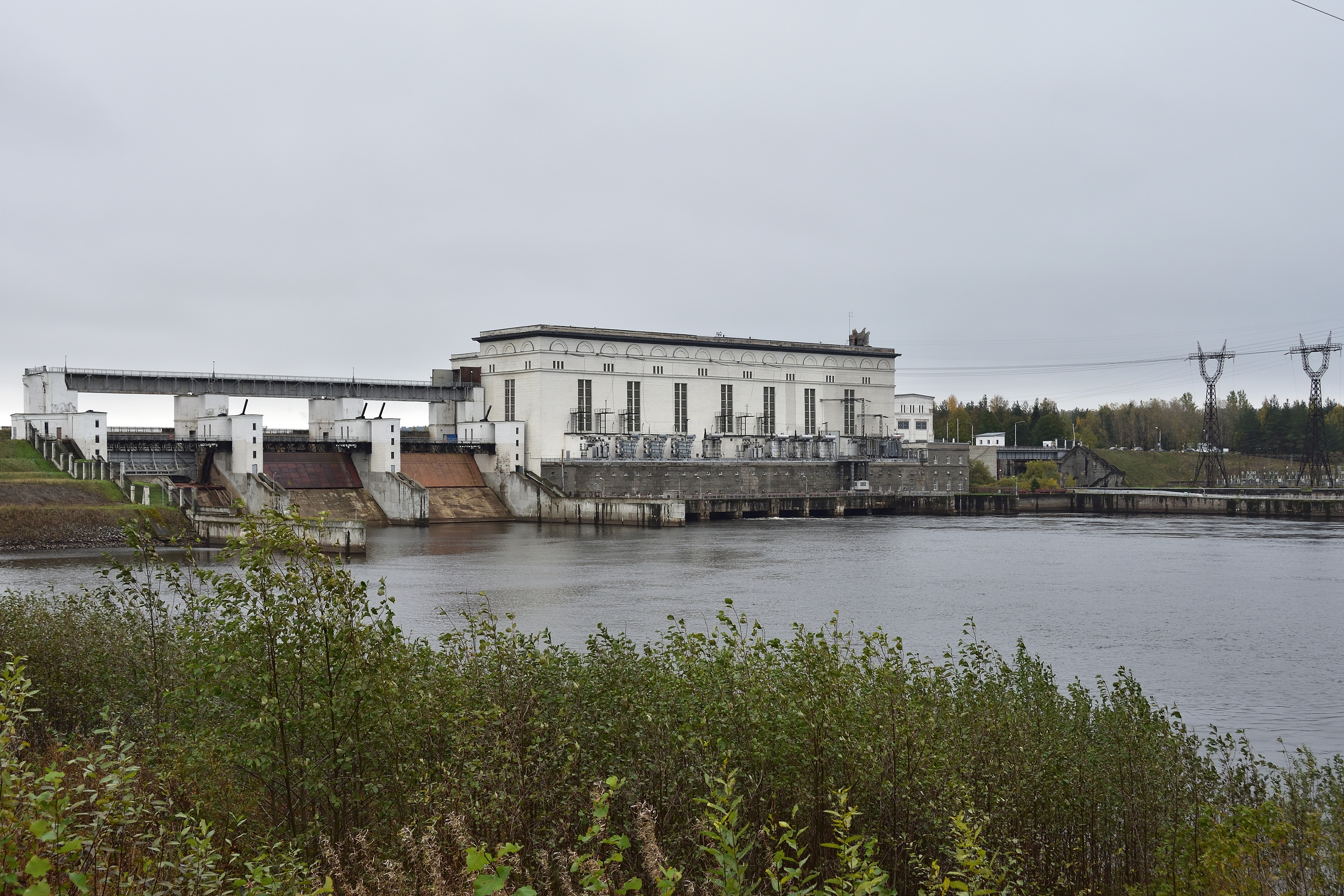

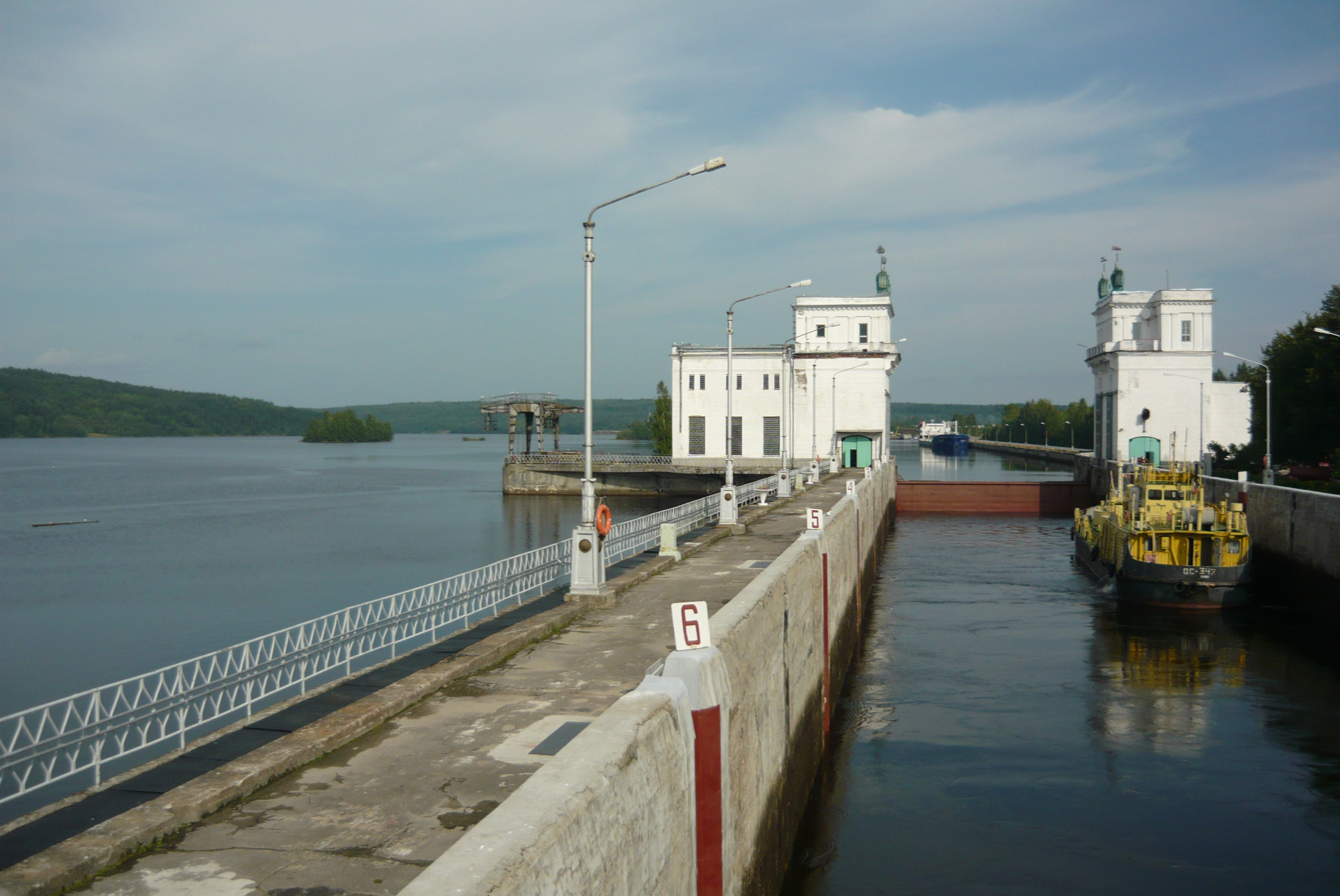

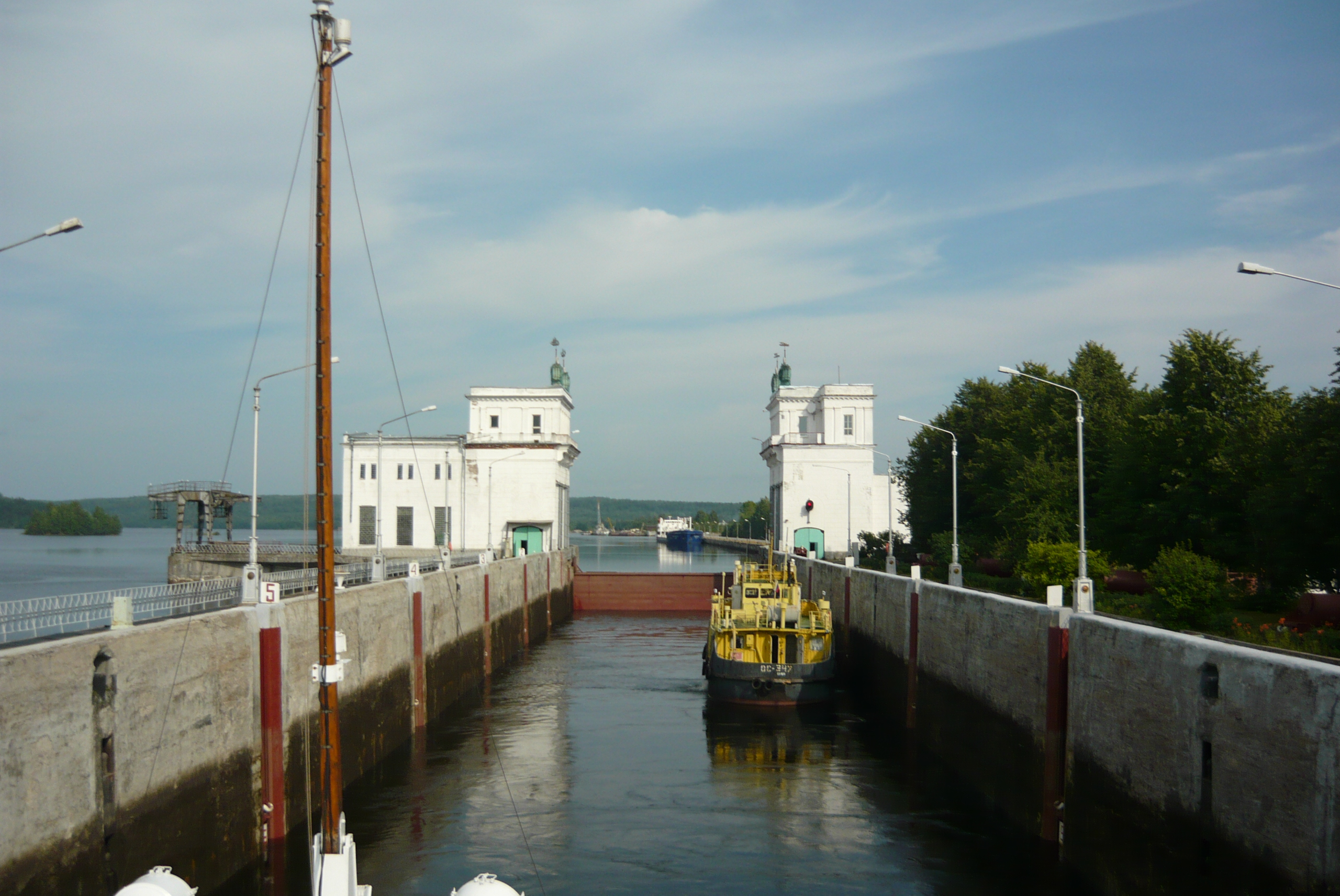

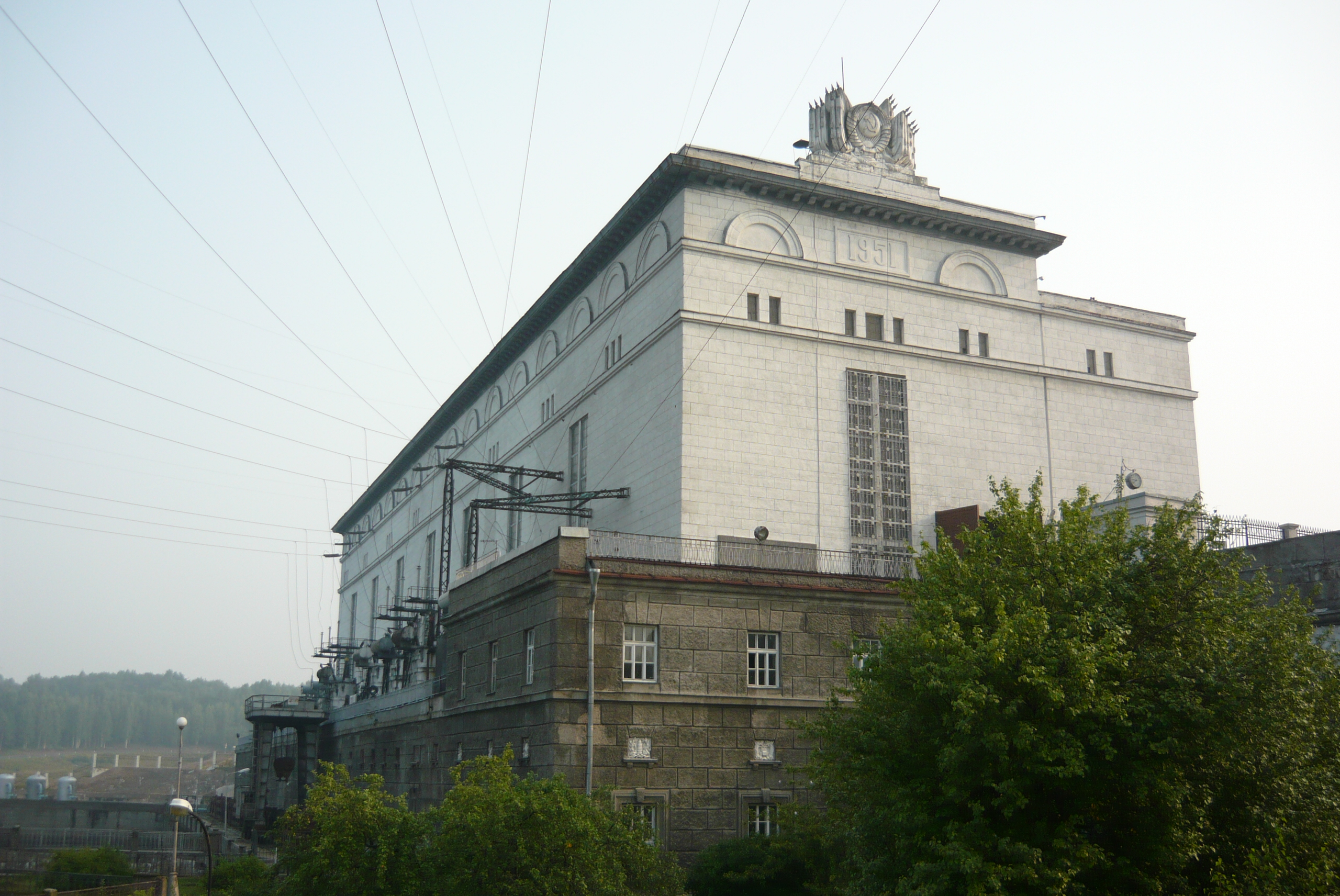

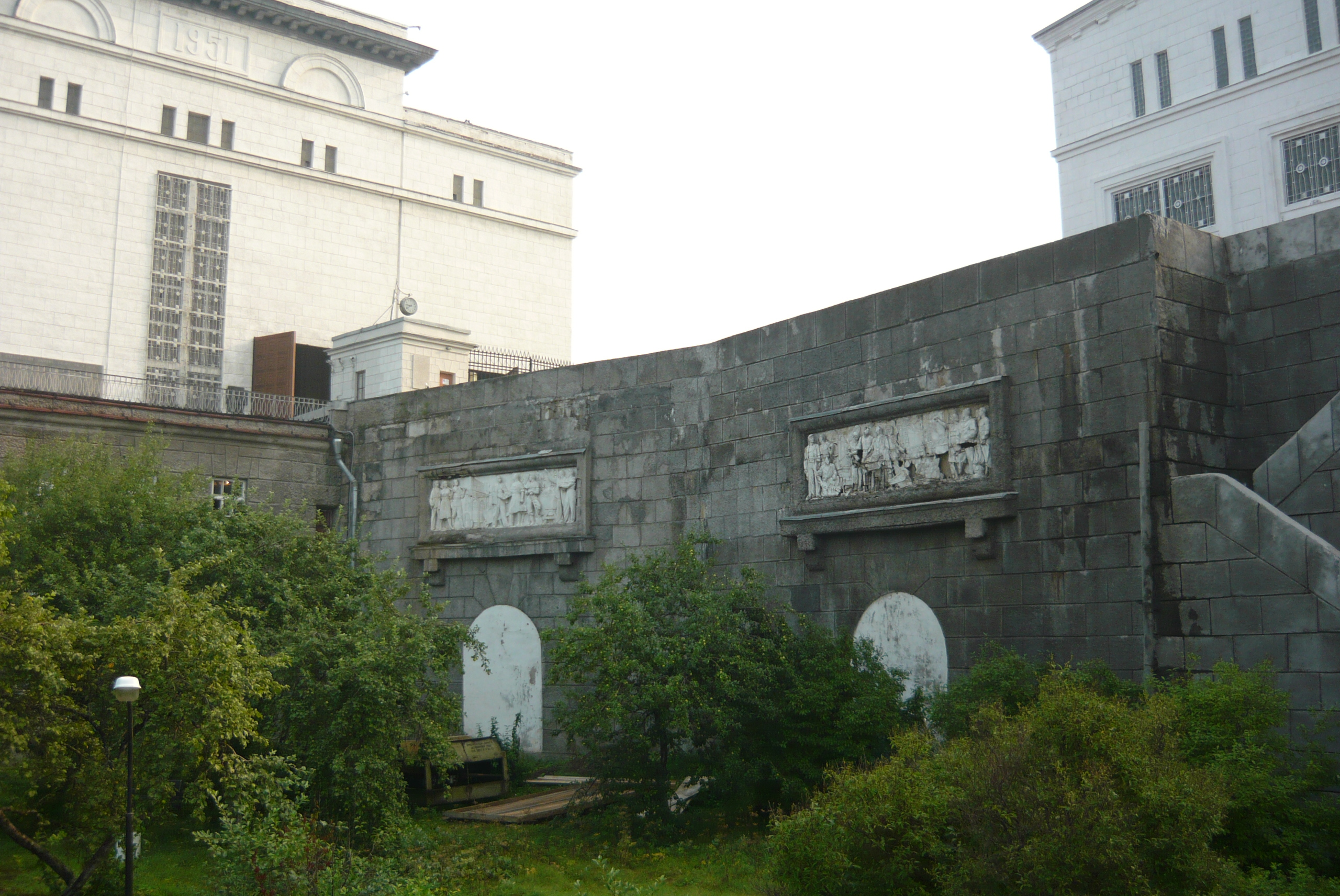
