= Genrikh Graftio =

Russian/Soviet engineer

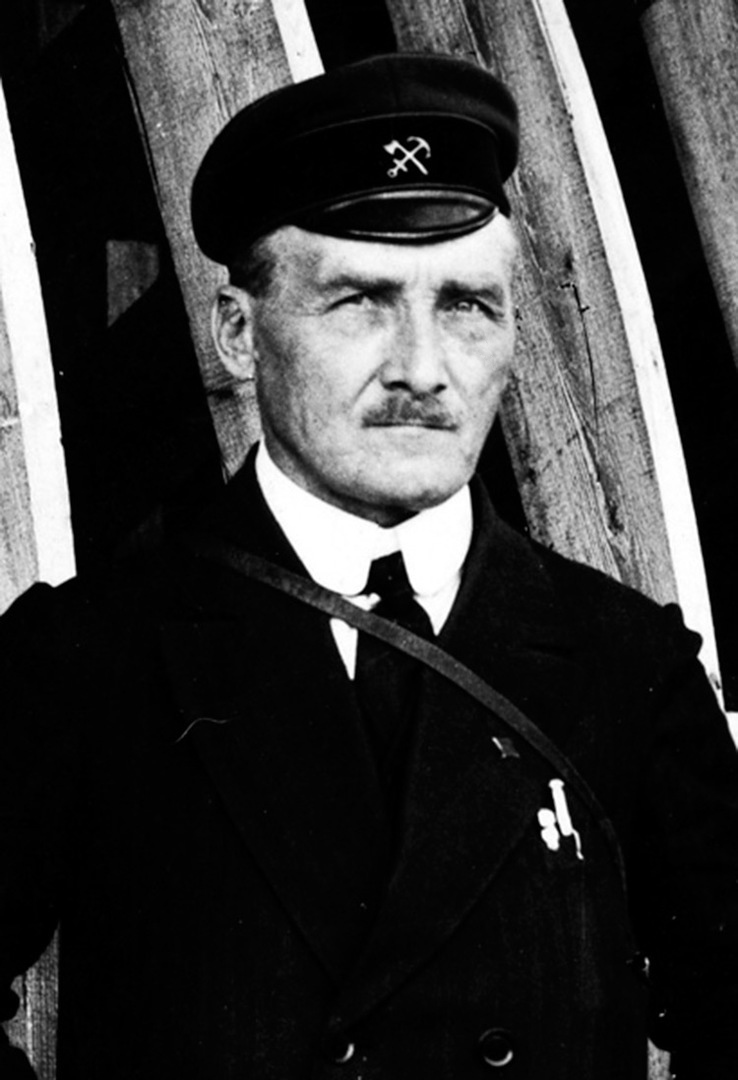
Genrikh Graftio

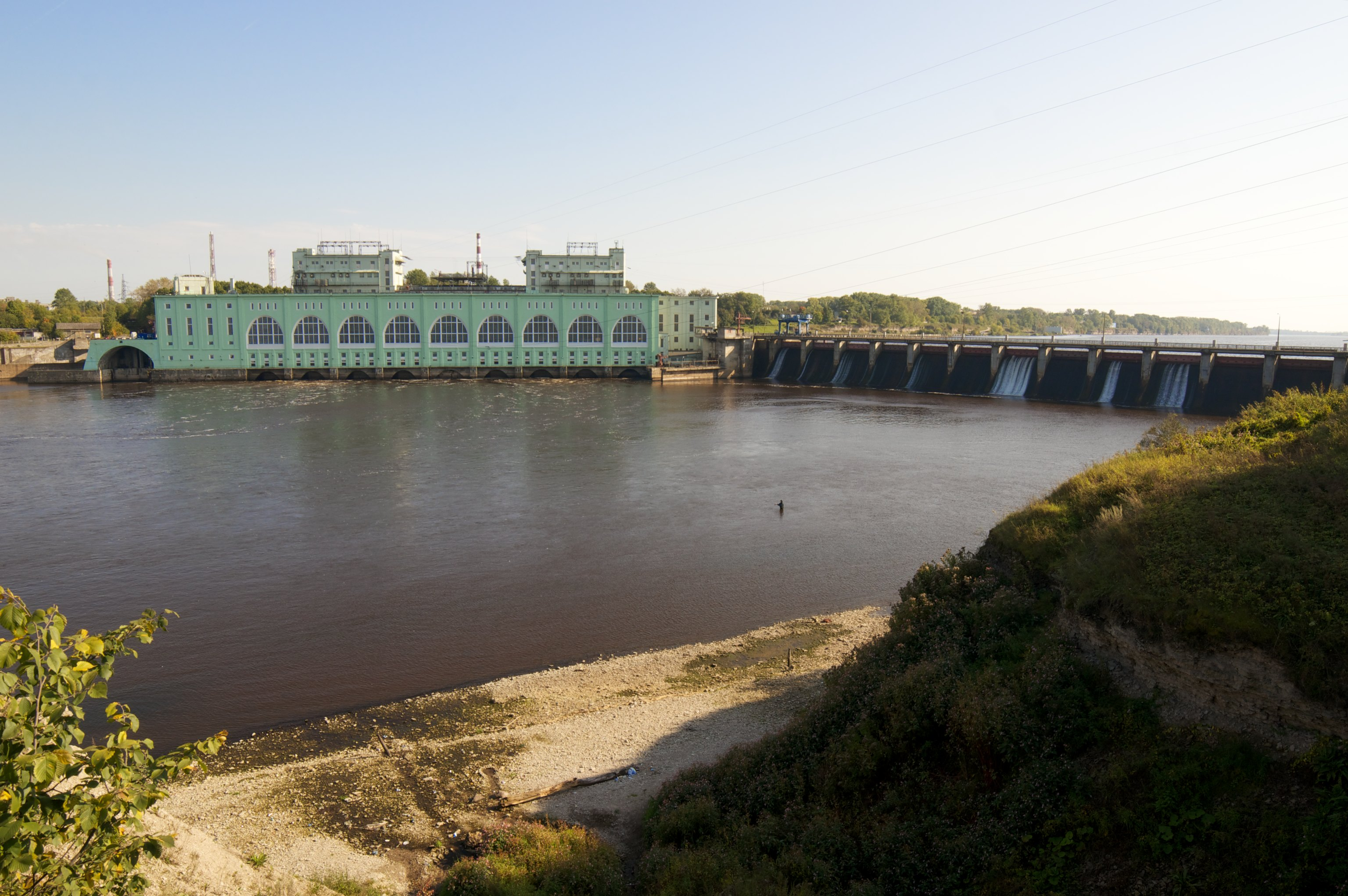
The dam of the Volkhov Hydroelectric Station, built under the direction of Graftio.

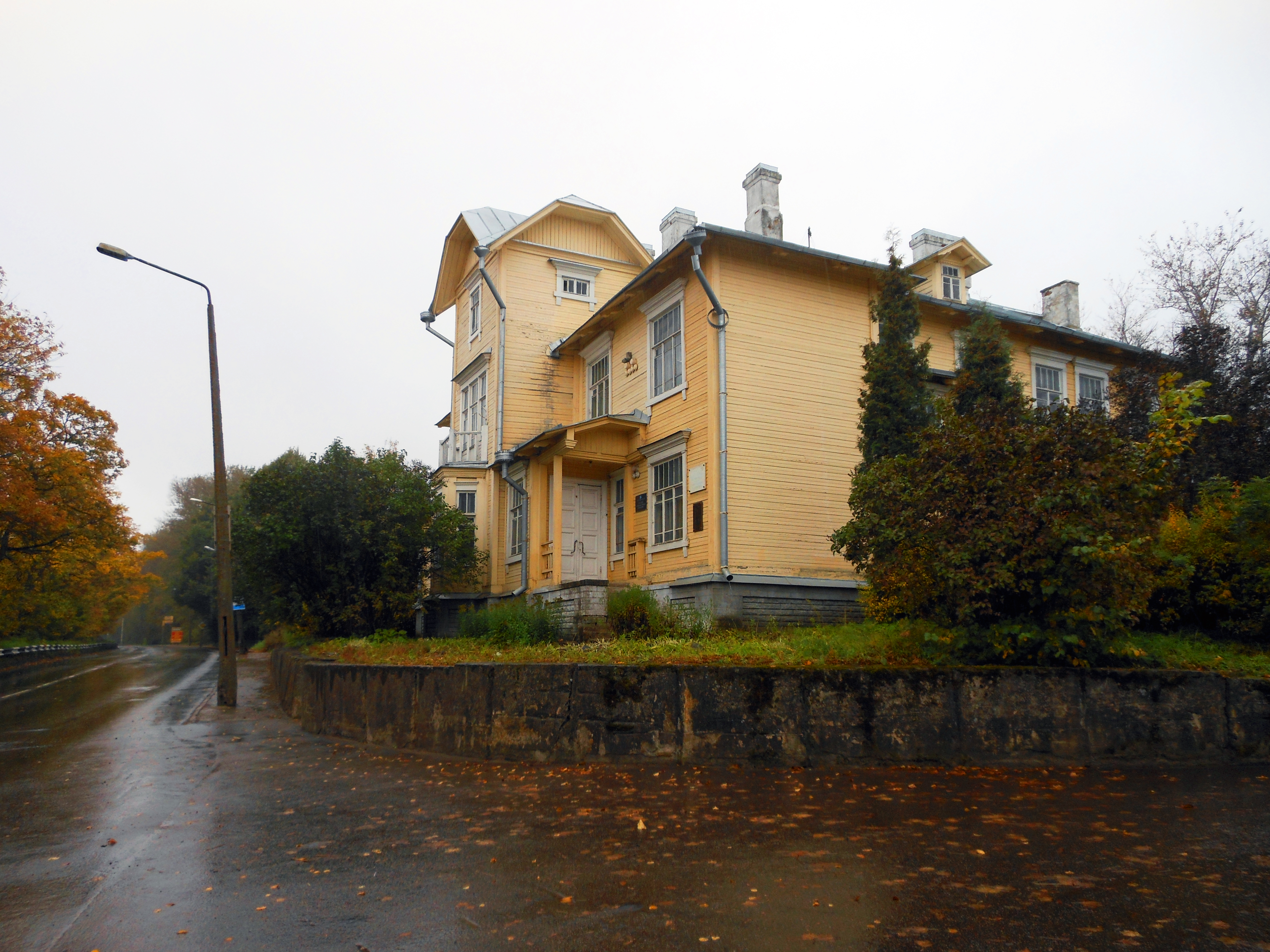
Graftio's house in Volkhov.

Genrikh Osipovich Graftio (Russian: Генрих Осипович Графтио; 26 December 1869 in Dünaburg – 30 April 1949 in Leningrad) was a Russian and Soviet engineer credited as a pioneer of the hydroelectric station construction, as one of the founders of the GOELRO plan, and notable for the construction of the first hydroelectric stations in the Soviet Union, the Volkhov Hydroelectric Station in Volkhov and the Lower Svir Hydroelectric Station in Svirstroy.

Genrikh Graftio graduated from the Imperial Novorossiya University in Odessa in 1892 and the Petersburg Institute of Transport Engineers in 1896, where he was teaching since 1907. In 1921, he was appointed a professor at this university. Between 1896 and 1900 he was intern in Europe and USA, studying the power equipment.

In 1900, Graftio created the first project of the electrified railway in Russia, which was never realized. In 1906, he was charged with developing an electric tram network in Saint Petersburg, then the capital of the Russian Empire, which was opened in 1907. Since 1905, he was involved in project design of hydroelectric stations. In 1905, he designed a project of a power plant on the Vuoksi River (never realized), and in 1910–1911 Graftio designed the power plant on the Volkhov River, which was only realized in 1927.

Between 1918 and 1920 Graftio was the first deputy of the chief construction engineer of the Volkhov Hydroelectric Station, the first hydroelectric station to be built according to the plan.

== GOELRO ==
He was one of the eight experts appointed to lead the 200 scientists gathered in February 1920 into the "State Commission for Electrification of Russia" (GOELRO) This was the program which aimed to provide sufficient electric power needed for future industrialization of Soviet Russia and, eventually, the Soviet Union. In the committee, he was responsible for the sections dealing with transportation and with the electrification of the Caucasus areas. The plan was drafted in December 1920

== Later construction work ==
Since early 1921, he was the chief construction engineer until the construction was completed in 1927. On 21 March 1921 he was arrested on the charges of counterrevolutionary activity, but was freed after several months due to intervention of Gleb Krzhizhanovsky, who needed Graftio to continue working on the construction. After 1927, he was the chief engineer of the construction of the Svir Hydroelectric Station, opened in 1933. Between 1938 and 1945 Graftio was the Chief Inspector of the Ministry of Energy, tasked with the power plant construction. In particular, he was responsible for the program of the restoration of the stations destroyed during World War II. He died in 1949 in Leningrad.

Besides Russian, Graftio was fluent in English, French, German, Italian and Swedish. In 1932, he was elected a member of the USSR Academy of Sciences. He dedicated all his works to his wife Antonina.

== Honours ==
- He was awarded the Order of Lenin
- He was awarded the Order of the Red Banner of Labour
- He was made a full member of the Academy of Sciences without going through all the intermediate steps
- The Lower Svir Hydroelectric Station was named after Graftio
- The tomb of Graftio in Bolsheokhtinskoye Cemetery in Saint Petersburg is protected by the government at the local level as a historical monument
- The monument to Graftio in Volkhov and the house where he lived during the construction of the power plant are both protected as historical monuments at the federal level.
