= Avtovo CHP-15 =

Power plant in St Petersburg, Russia

Avtovo TEC-15
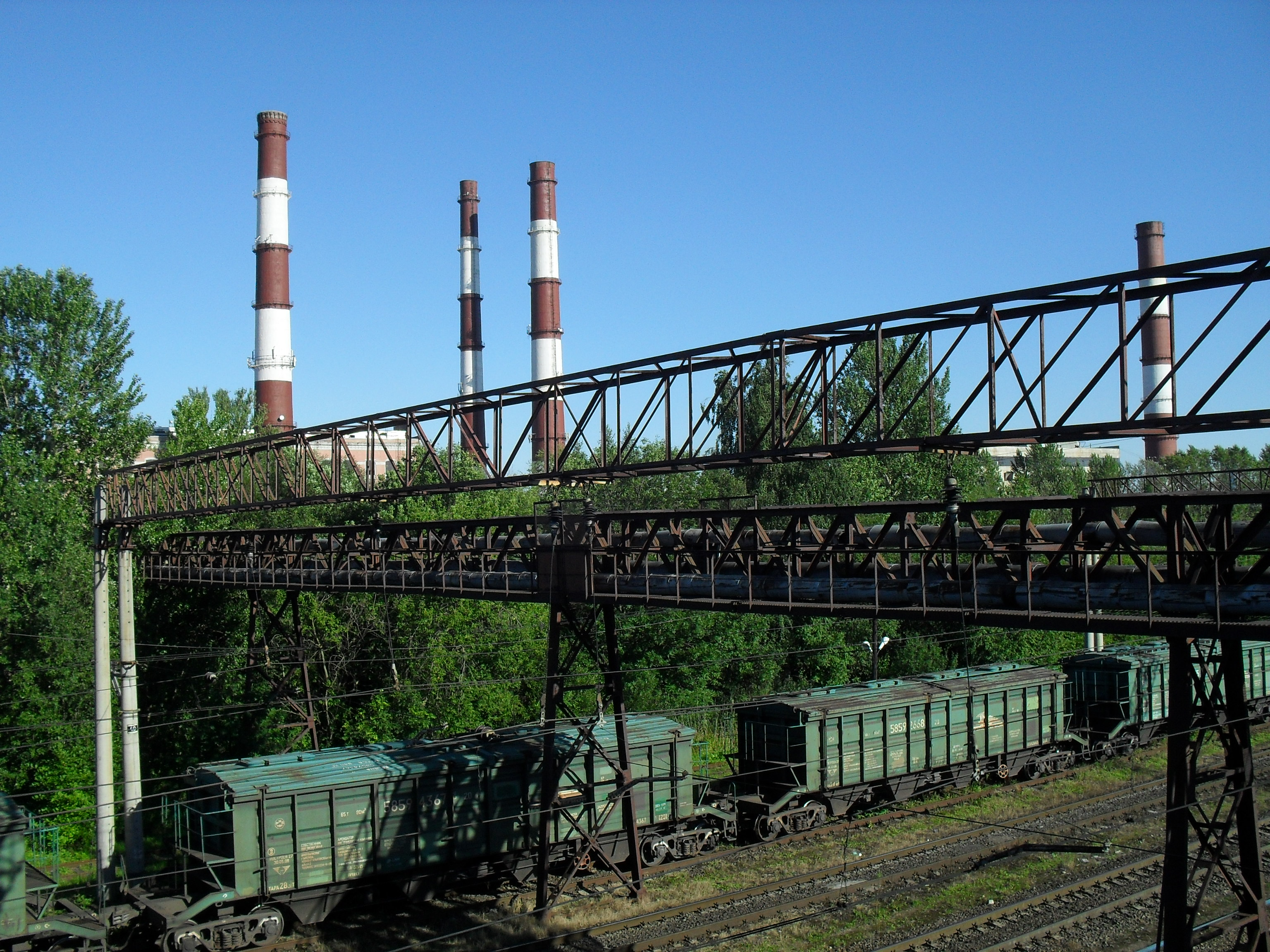
- Country: Russia
- Location: Saint Petersburg
- Coordinates: 59°52′12.31″N 30°17′12.78″E
- Status: Operational
- Owner: TGC-1

Thermal power station
- Primary fuel: Natural gas
- Secondary fuel: Fuel oil (backup fuel)
- Turbine technology: Gas turbine
- Cooling source: Air-cooled condenser

Power generation
- Units operational: 7
- Make and model: Power Machines
- Nameplate capacity: 321 MW (Electric); 1,833 MW (Warm)
- Annual net output: 1,471.5 GWh (Electric), 3,682,320 Gcal (Warm)

External links
- Website: www.tgc1.ru/production/complex/spb-branch/avtovskaya-chpp/
- All data is taken from an official site of station

Avtovo CHP-15 provides electric and thermal energy to the Admiralteisky, Moskovsky, Kirovsky and Krasnoselsky Districts of St. Petersburg.

The director of station is Alexander Sidorov.

== History ==
It began operation on December 26, 1956.

Initially the station used coal, but towards the end of the 20th century TGC-1 began converting to gas. In connection with development of a gas powered station, physical deterioration and equipment obsolescence, reconstruction began in 2000 at the station.

- In 2000 the turbine unit number 3 was replaced.
- On December 28, 2007 the new turbine unit number 2, with an electric capacity of 30 MW, and thermal capacity of 75 GCal/h, began operation. Also the transformers and generator were replaced.

On August 23, 2009 there was a fire in the repaired unit.
