= Lower Svir Hydroelectric Station =

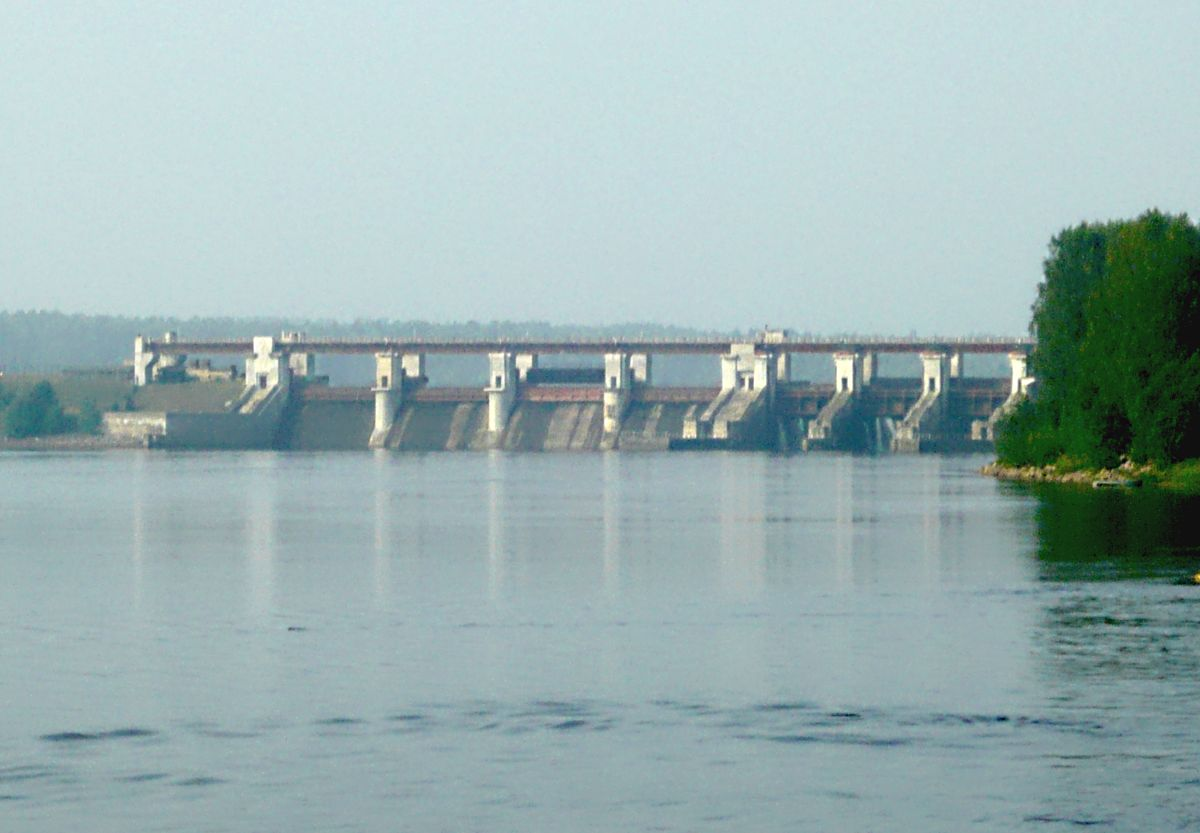

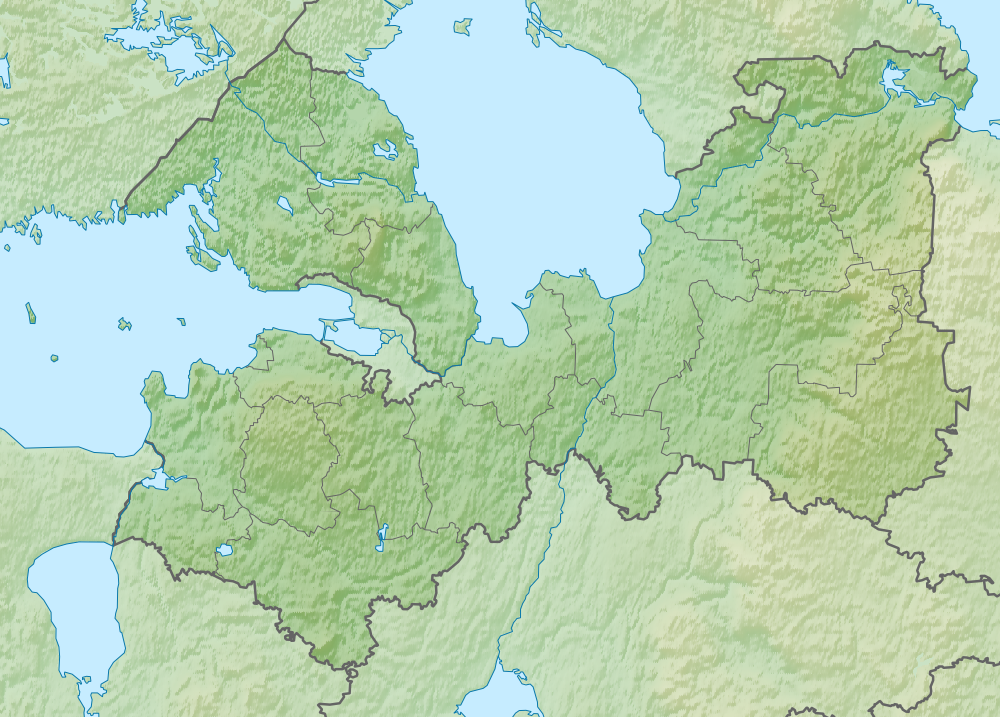
- Location of the Lower Svir Hydroelectric Station in Leningrad Oblast
- Official name: Нижнесвирская ГЭС
- Country: Russia
- Location: Svirstroy, Leningrad Oblast
- Coordinates: 60°48′18″N 33°42′18″E
- Status: Operational
- Opening date: 1933
- Owner: TGC-1

Dam and spillways
- Impounds: Svir River

Power Station
- Installed capacity: 99 MW

Lower Svir Hydroelectric Station (Russian: Нижнесвирская ГЭС) is a hydroelectric station on the Svir River located in the urban-type settlement of Svirstroy, Leningrad Oblast, in northwestern Russia. It was open on December 19, 1933 and has the total power of 99 MW. It is operated by the TGC-1 power company.

Svir is a part of the Volga–Baltic Waterway, connecting the basins of the Volga and the Neva Rivers, with heavy cargo and cruise traffic. To accommodate the waterway, a lock was built to bypass the dam of the power station.

The construction started in 1927 and was coordinated by Genrikh Graftio, who had been responsible for the construction of the Volkhov Hydroelectric Station. The construction was complicated by the fact that the ground in the area is soft, and the dam was built with certain angle to the riverbed, so that the water pressure pushed it to the ground. The construction was completed in 1933. During World War II, the Svir separated Soviet (south) and Finnish (north) troops, and the dam was destroyed. It was restored after the war. The name of the station was originally the Svir Hydroelectric Station.

Since 1955, the Lower Svir Hydroelectric Station and the Upper Svir Hydroelectric Station, located in Podporozhye, perform coordination and, in particular, jointly regulate the water level in the Svir.

The station was named after Genrikh Graftio.
