= Narva Hydroelectric Station =

Hydroelectric power station in Narva, Estonia

Narva Dam
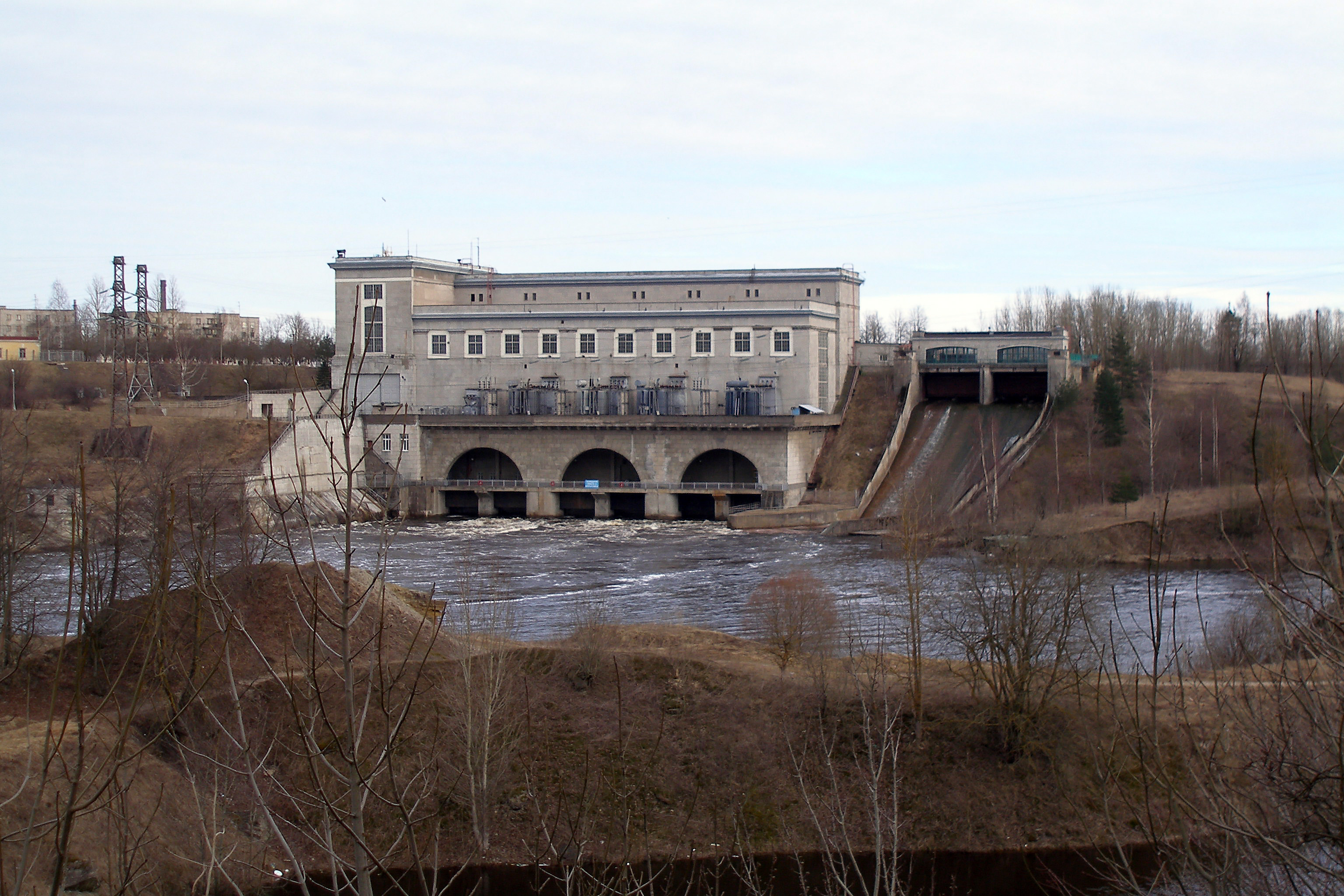
- Narva Hydroelectric Station on the Narva River

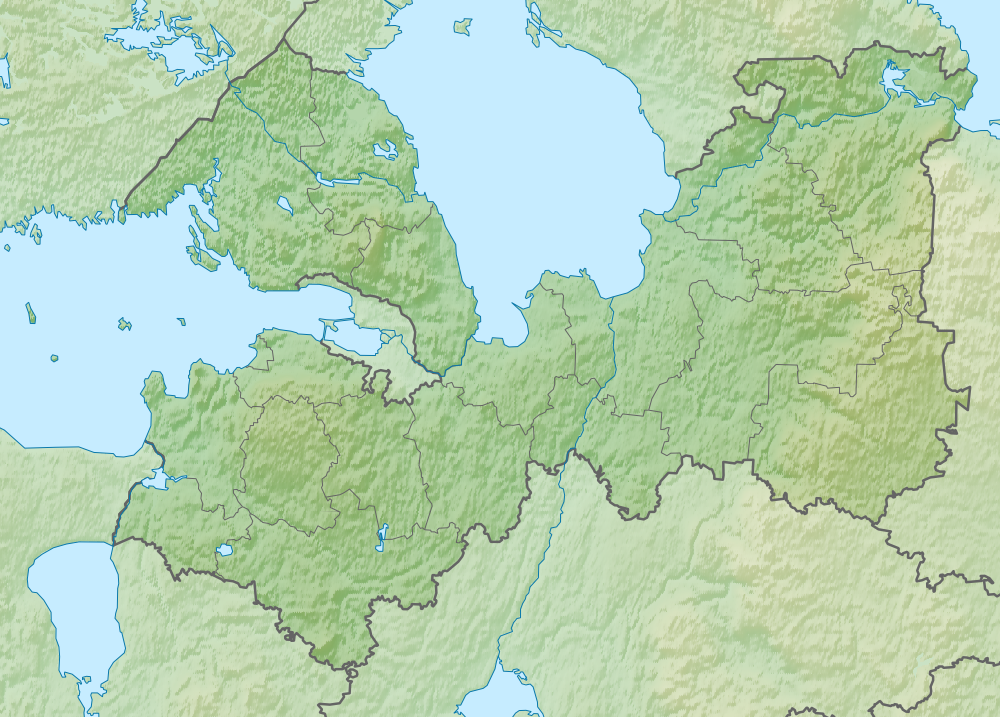
- Location of the Narva Dam on the Estonia–Russia border in the Leningrad Oblast Narva Dam (Russia)
- Official name: Нарвская гидроэлектростанция/ Narva hüdroelektrijaam
- Country: Russia (De facto) Estonia (De jure)
- Location: Ivangorod/Jaanilinn
- Coordinates: 59°22′04″N 28°12′38″E
- Purpose: Power
- Status: Operational
- Construction began: 1950
- Opening date: 1955
- Owners: TGC-1 (dam in the Russian side); Narva Power Plants (dam in the Estonian side)

Dam and spillways
- Impounds: Narva River

Reservoir
- Creates: Narva Reservoir
- Active capacity: 91,000,000 m^{3} (3.213634672×10^{9} cu ft)
- Inactive capacity: 365,000,000 m^{3} (1.2889853353×10^{10} cu ft)
- Surface area: 191 km^{2} (74 sq mi)

Narva Hydroelectric Station
- Coordinates: 59°22′4″N 28°12′38″E
- Operator: TGC-1
- Turbines: 3 x 41.7 MW
- Installed capacity: 125 MW
- Annual generation: 640 GWh

The Narva Hydroelectric Station (Russian: Нарвская гидроэлектростанция, Estonian: Narva hüdroelektrijaam) is a hydroelectric power station in Ivangorod, Russia. It is fed by the Narva Reservoir on the Narva River and is located 2 kilometres (1.2 mi) downstream of the Narva Dam (Kulgu Dam) on the east bank of the river. It was designed by a Leningrad design bureau Lenhydroproject and constructed during 1950–1955.

After the dissolution of the Soviet Union the Estonia–Russia border bisects the dam of the reservoir. The power station itself is entirely on Russian territory. The power station is owned and operated by TGC-1 power company. The dam is owned by TGC-1 and Narva Power Plants.
