= Narva Reservoir =

Reservoir in Russia

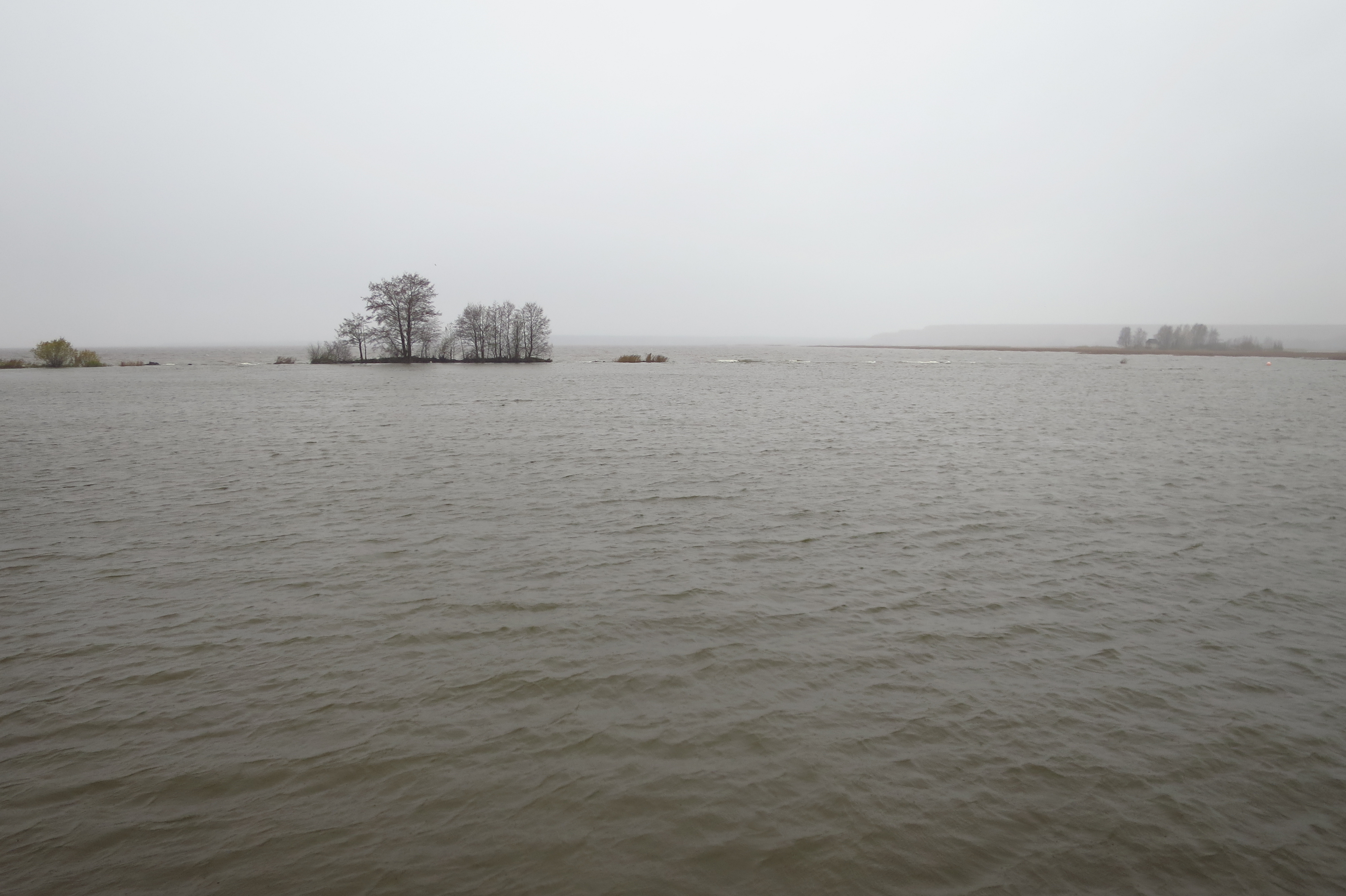
- Autumn view of Narva Reservoir from Kulgu harbor

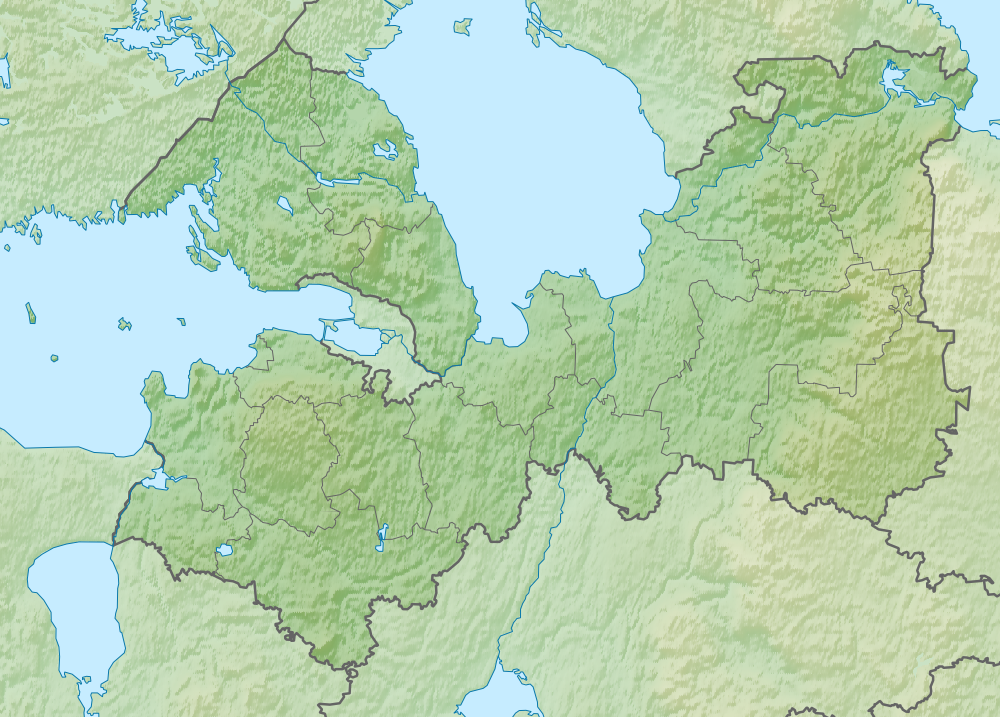
- Location within Leningrad Oblast
- Coordinates: 59°18′N 28°10′E
- Type: Reservoir
- Primary inflows: Narva River, Plyussa River
- Primary outflows: Narva River
- Catchment area: 55,848 km^{2} (21,563 sq mi)
- Basin countries: Russia, Estonia, Latvia, Belarus
- Surface area: 191 km^{2} (74 sq mi)
- Average depth: 1.8 m (5 ft 11 in)
- Max. depth: 15 m (49 ft)
- Water volume: 365 hm^{3} (296,000 acre⋅ft)
- Residence time: 12 days

Narva Reservoir (Estonian: Narva veehoidla; Russian: Нарвское водохранилище, romanized: Narvskoye vodokhranilishche) is a reservoir by the Narva River, shared by Russia and Estonia.

The reservoir was constructed during 1955–1956, during the Soviet era. It provides water to Narva Hydroelectric Station (installed capacity 125 MW, located on the Russian side and owned by the power company TGC-1), and cooling water to the Estonian Narva Power Plants. Its surface area at normal headwater level of 25 metres (82 ft) is 191 square kilometres (74 sq mi), of which 40 square kilometres (15 sq mi) belongs to Estonia. Its drainage basin is 55,848 square kilometres (21,563 sq mi).

The overall water exchange rate is high (about 30 times a year), with some almost stagnant areas. The ecological status is estimated as "good" (as of 2007).

During the construction of the Hydroelectric plant, Soviet authorities assured the native Estonians that they would divert the Narva river to minimize the size of the reservoir, but never did, resulting in at least 8 villages being submerged under the reservoir.
