= Volkhov (inhabited locality) =

Volkhov (Russian: Волхов) is the name of several inhabited localities in Russia.

Urban localities

- Volkhov, a town under the administrative jurisdiction of Volkhovskoye Settlement Municipal Formation in Volkhovsky District of Leningrad Oblast; 59°55′N 32°18′E

Rural localities

- Volkhov (rural locality), a settlement in Berezhkovskoye Settlement Municipal Formation of Volkhovsky District in Leningrad Oblast; 59°49′N 32°22′E

Renamed localities

- Volkhov, name of the selo (a town in 1922–1924) of Gostinopolye in Volkhovsky District of Leningrad Oblast in 1922–1927; 59°49′N 32°21′E
