= Krasnoklutchevskaya Dam =

Dam in Russia

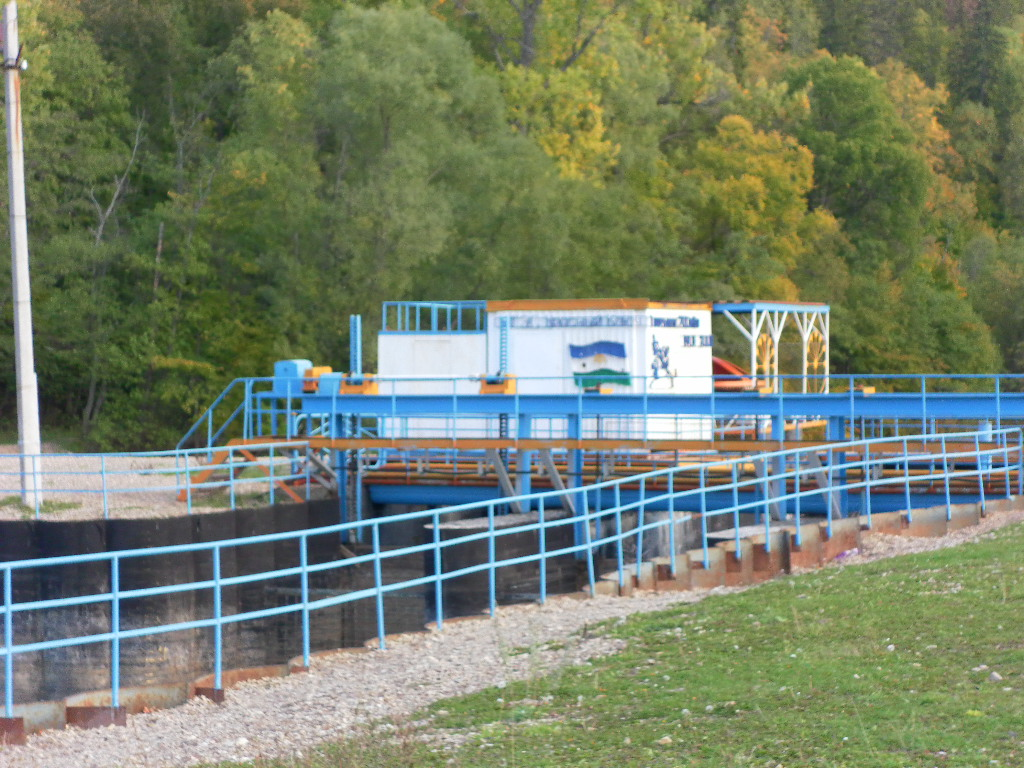

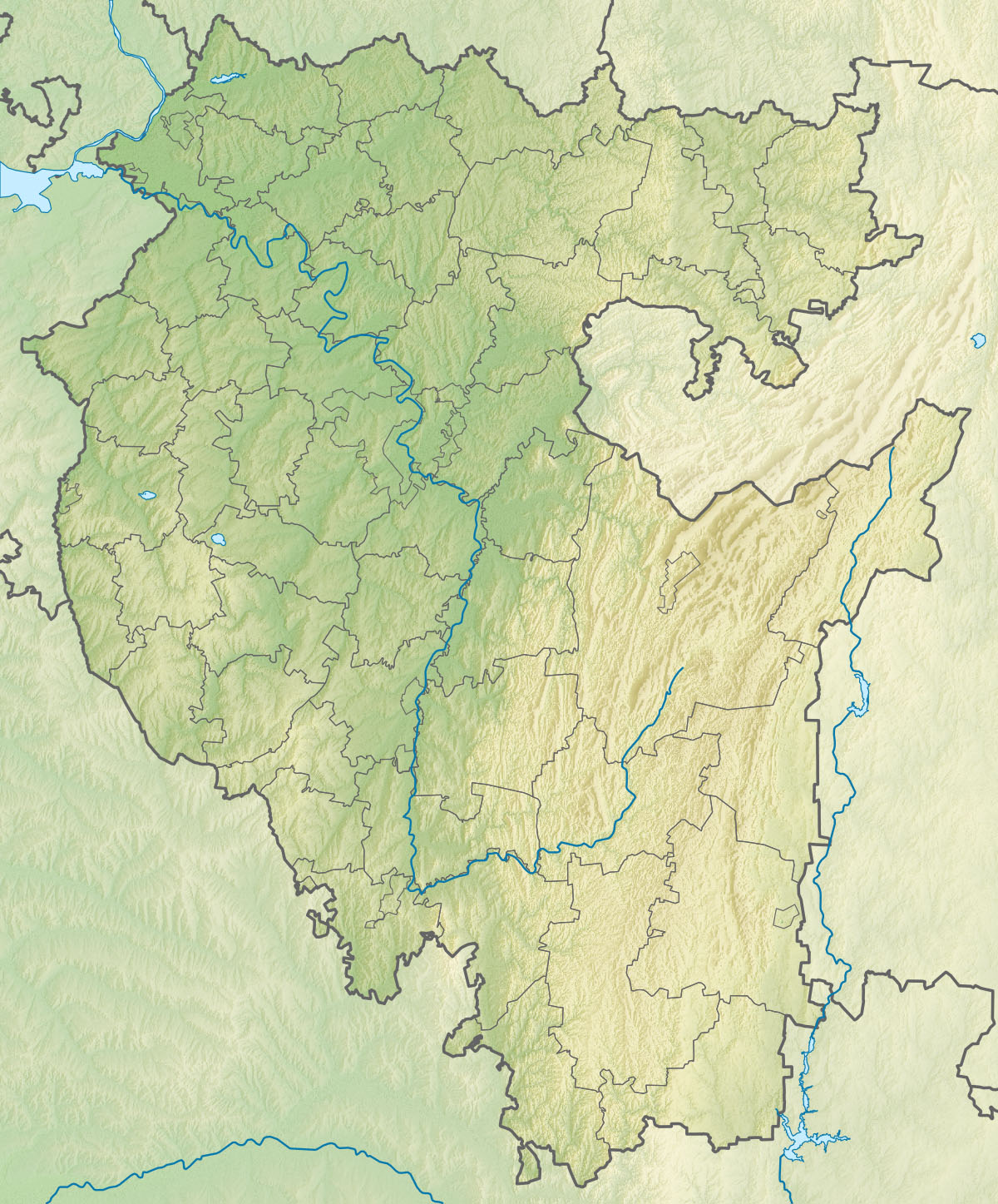
- Location within Bashkortostan Location within Russia
- Official name: Krasnoklutchevskaya hydroelectric power
- Location: Krasniy Klutch, Bashkortostan, Russia
- Coordinates: 55.377107546429045°N 56.67939754395508°E
- Construction began: 2000
- Opening date: 2001
- Owner: ZAO Bashuralmonolit
- Operator: Rodnik Krasniy Klutch

Power Station
- Installed capacity: 0.2 MW

Krasnoklyuchevskaya hydroelectric power station is a small hydro power station in Nurimanovsky District Bashkortostan, Russia.

== Overview ==
The hydroelectric power station was built within the boundaries of a specially protected natural area on the karst spring Krasny Klyuch, which gave its name to the village of Krasny Klyuch . The power station was designed by the association "Hydroenergoprom" (of St. Petersburg), the construction was carried out by the enterprise "BashUralMonolit".

The capacity of the small hydroelectric power station is 200 kW. The turbine is a rotary-blade turbine; according to the plan, a second hydroturbine should also be installed. The owner is Bashuralmonolit CJSC.

There are two mutually exclusive opinions surrounding the station:

- According to official data, the power plant is operating, the additional activity of the enterprise is the subsidiary production of bottled water with the same name, which is currently operating, supporting the economy of the region. The improvement of the place made it possible to solve existing problems.
- In addition, there is an opinion that the station has never been used to generate electricity, is idle, and during its construction caused irreparable damage to the ecology of the area.
