= Volkhov Hydroelectric Station =

Volkhov Hydroelectric Plant
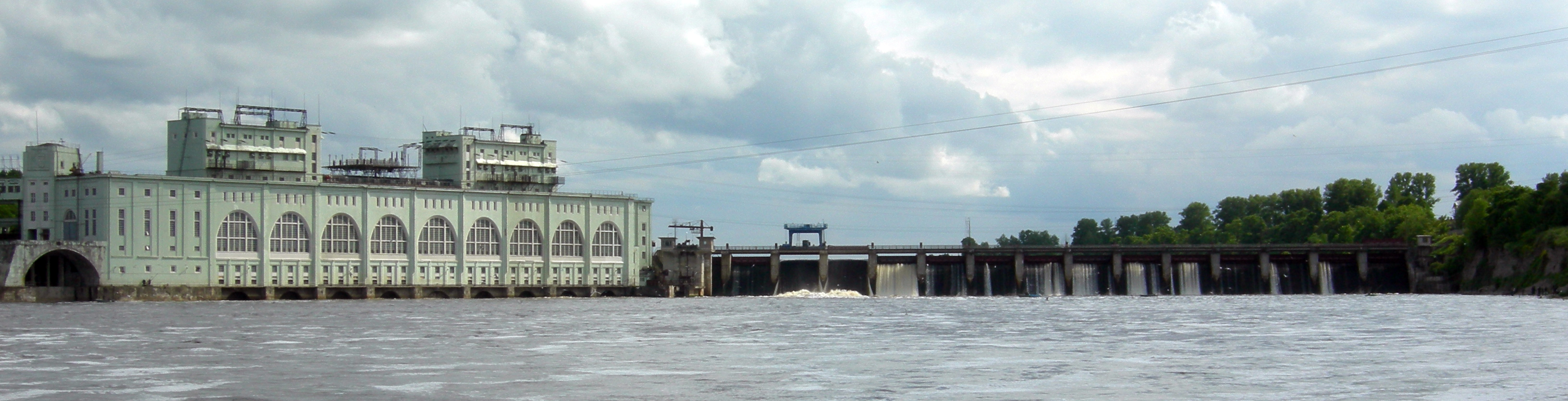
- Volkhov hydroelectric plant

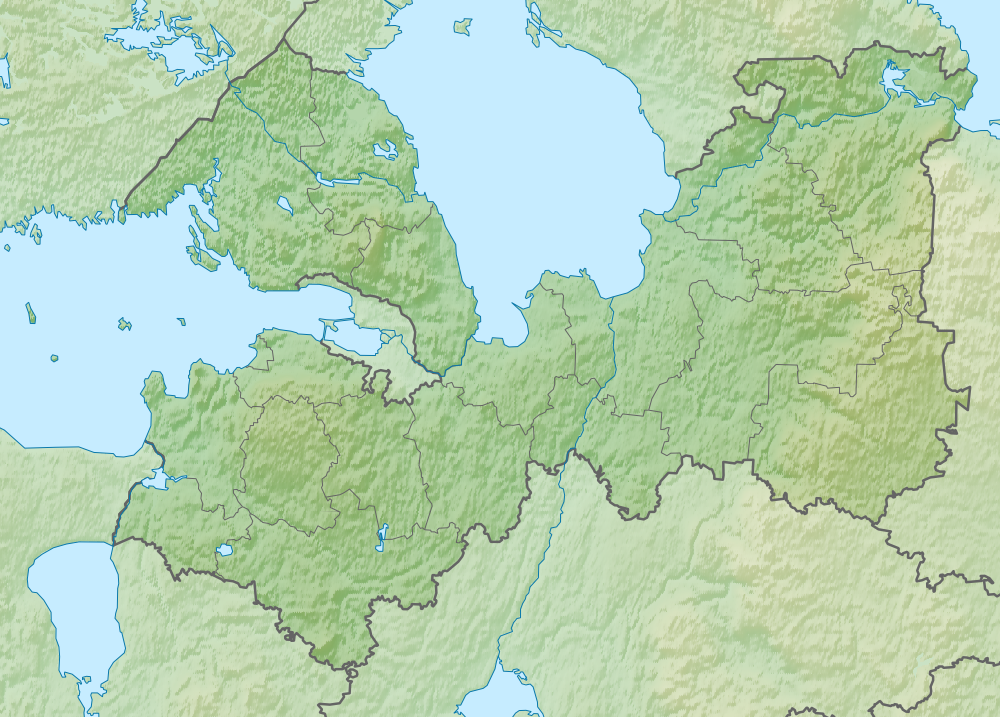
- Location of the Volkhov Hydroelectric Plant in Leningrad Oblast
- Country: Russia
- Location: Volkhov, Leningrad Oblast
- Coordinates: 59°54′38″N 32°20′35″E
- Status: Operational
- Construction began: 1918
- Opening date: 1926
- Owner: TGC-1

Dam and spillways
- Impounds: Volkhov River

Power Station
- Installed capacity: 86 MW
- Annual generation: 347 GWh

Volkhov hydroelectric plant (Russian: Волховская ГЭС имени В. И. Ленина, romanized: Volkhovskaya GZS imeni V. I. Lenina), named after V.I. Lenin, is a hydroelectric station on the Volkhov River located in the town of Volkhov, Leningrad Oblast, in northwestern Russia. It is the oldest and longest serving hydroelectric plant in Soviet Union and Russia. It is a part of the Ladoga cascade.

Construction work started in 1918. On September 16, 1921, it was included into a GOELRO plan. Genrikh Graftio, one of the founders of the plan, was in charge of the construction of the station. The plant was completed in 1927 with a capacity of generating 6,000 kilowatts of electricity.

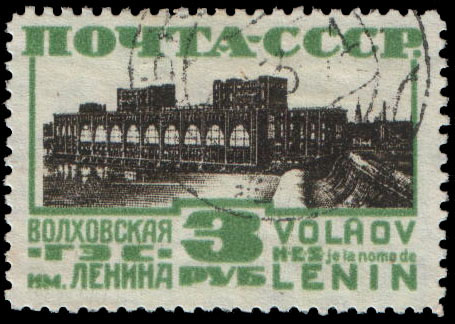
The station on a 1930 Soviet postage stamp

In 1993—1996, three hydroturbines were replaced by new 12 MW units, other units were planned to be replaced in 2007–2010. After these replacements, the plant is estimated to achieve total power of 98 MW.
