= Svirstroy =

Svirstroy Свирьстрой
- Urban-type settlement
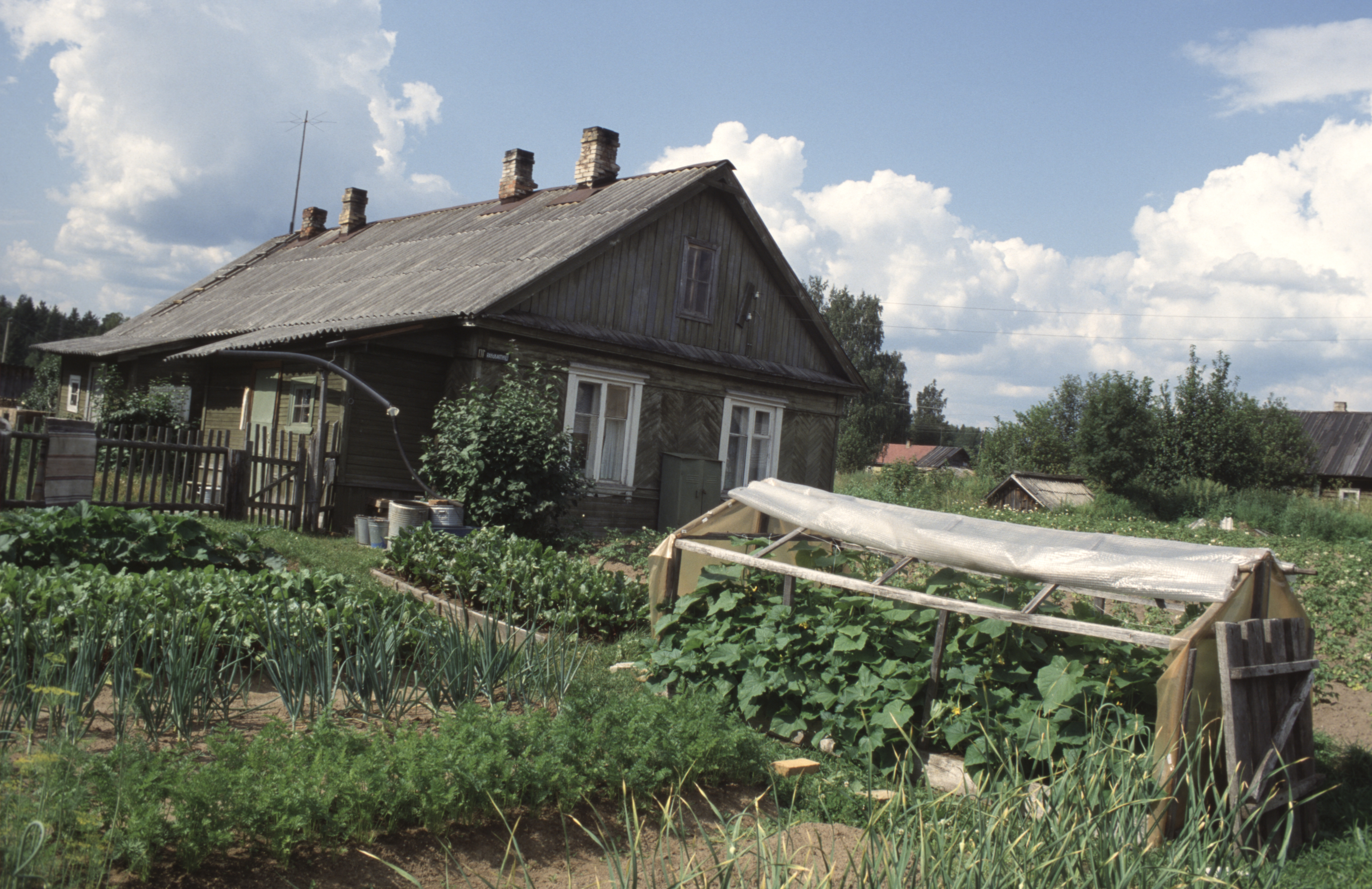

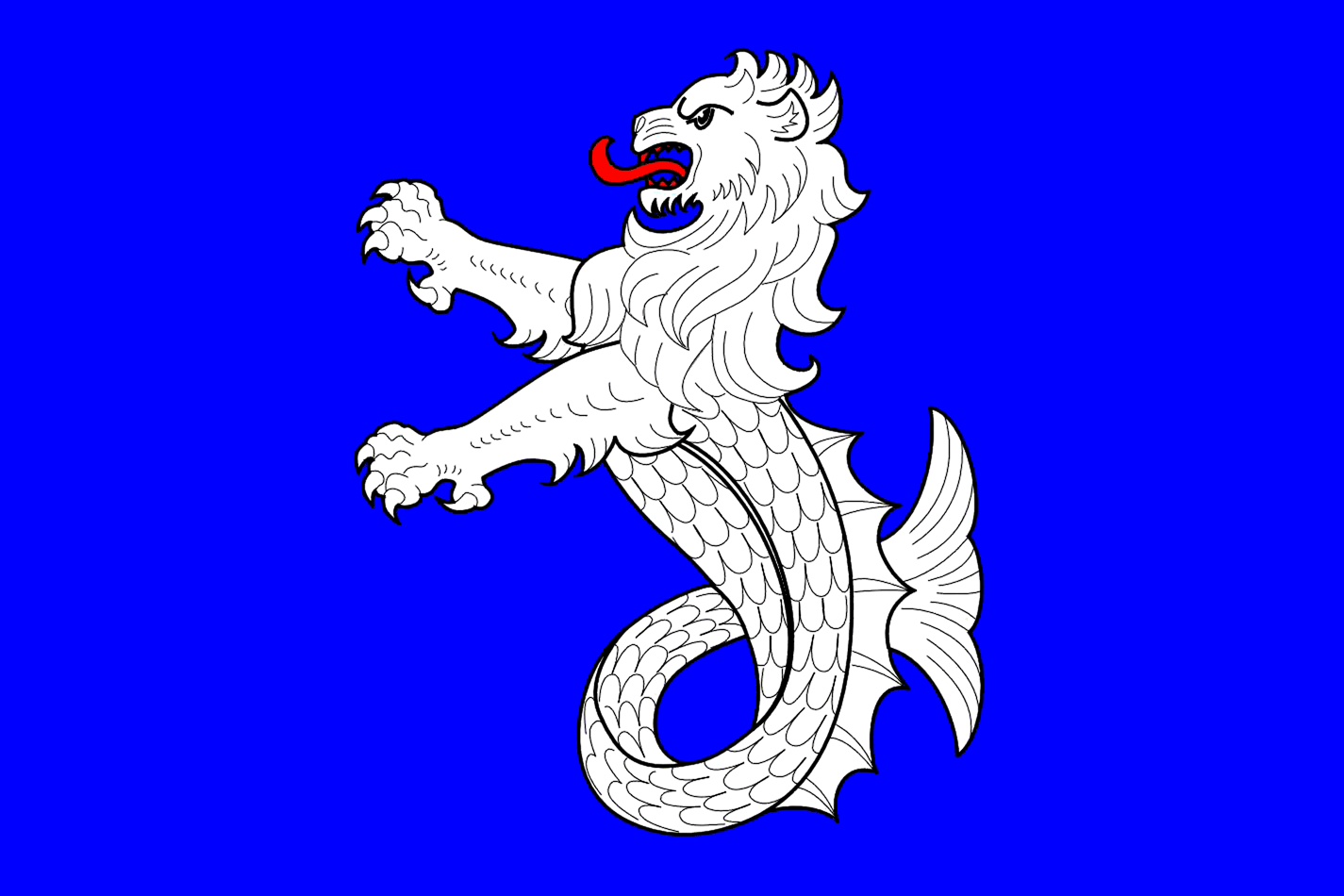
- Flag
- Interactive map of Svirstroy
- Location of Svirstroy Svirstroy (Leningrad Oblast)
- Coordinates: 60°48′0″N 33°43′17″E
- Country: Russia
- Federal subject: Leningrad Oblast
- Administrative district: Lodeynopolsky District
- Urban-type settlement status since: 1931

Population (2010 Census)
  - Total: 927
  - Estimate (2024): 904 (−2.5%)

Municipal status
  - Municipal district: Lodeynopolsky Municipal District
  - Urban settlement: Svirstroyskoye Urban Settlement
  - Capital of: Svirstroyskoye Urban Settlement
- Time zone: UTC+3 (MSK)
- Postal code: 187726
- OKTMO ID: 41627154051

Svirstroy (Russian: Свирьстрой) is an urban locality (an urban-type settlement) in Lodeynopolsky District of Leningrad Oblast, Russia, located on the left bank of the Svir River several kilometers northeast of the town of Lodeynoye Pole. Municipally, it is incorporated as Svirstroyskoye Urban Settlement, one of the two urban settlements in the district. The name of the settlement is an abbreviation meaning Construction on the Svir. Population: 927 (2010 census); 1,044 (2002 census); 1,156 (1989 Soviet census).

== History ==
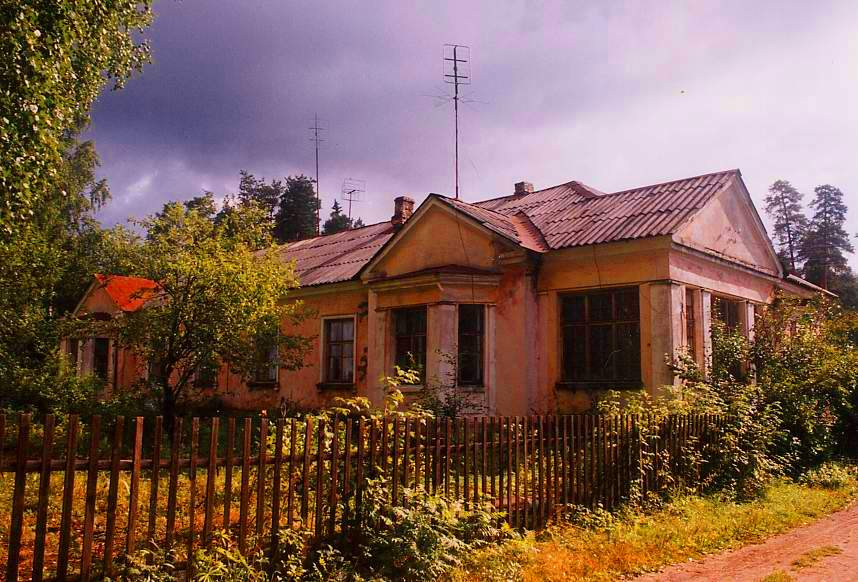
Svirstroy

In 1927, a large-scale construction of the Lower Svir Hydroelectric Station started, and subsequently in 1931, the concentration camp of Svirlag was established. In the same year, Svirstroy was granted urban-type settlement status. On May 13, 1963, during the abortive Khrushhyov administrative reform, Svirstroy was subordinated to the town of Podporozhye, but on January 13, 1965 it was transferred back to Lodeynopolsky District.

== Economy ==
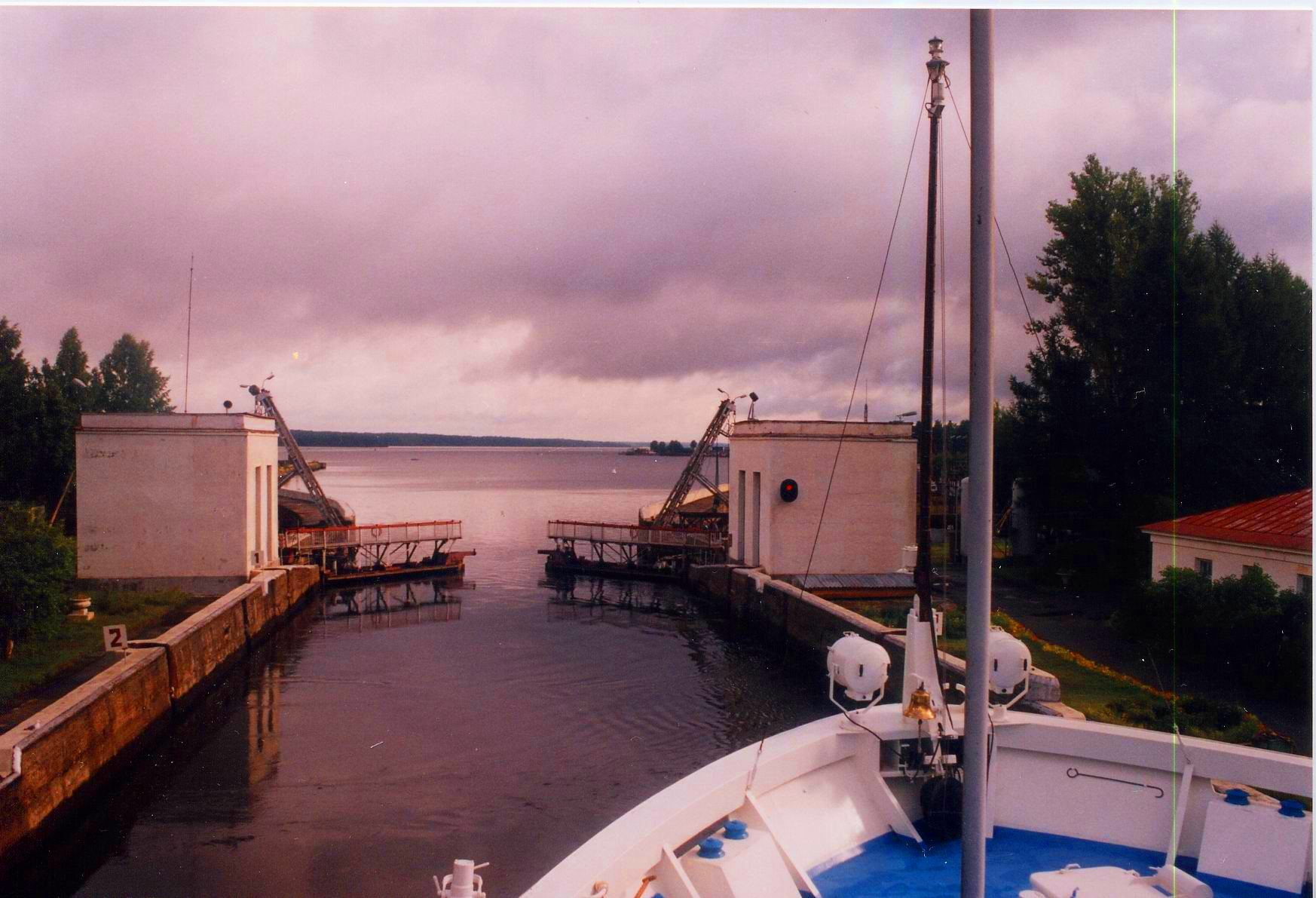
Cruise and cargo traffic along the waterway

The economy of the settlement is essentially based on the Lower Svir Hydroelectric Station.

=== Transportation ===
A paved road connecting Lodeynoye Pole with Podporozhye and Vytegra passes Svirstroy.

The Svir River is navigable and is a part of the Volga–Baltic Waterway, connecting the basins of the Volga and the Neva Rivers. There is regular cruise and cargo traffic along the waterway.
