= Volkhov =

Town in Leningrad Oblast, Russia

Volkhov Волхов
- Town
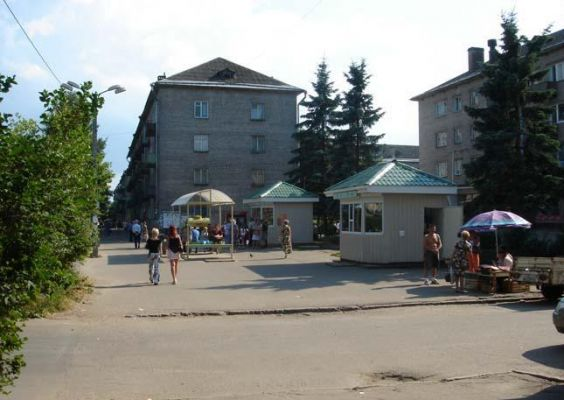
- In Volkhov

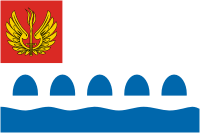
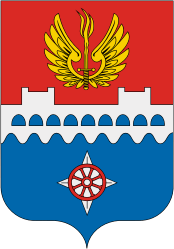
- Flag Coat of arms
- Interactive map of Volkhov
- Location of Volkhov Volkhov (Leningrad Oblast)
- Coordinates: 59°55′N 32°18′E
- Country: Russia
- Federal subject: Leningrad Oblast
- Administrative district: Volkhovsky District
- Settlement municipal formationSelsoviet: Volkhovskoye Settlement Municipal Formation
- Founded: Beginning of the 20th century
- Town status since: December 27, 1933
- Elevation: 33 m (108 ft)

Population (2010 Census)
  - Total: 47,182
  - Estimate (2025): 37,337 (−20.9%)

Administrative status
  - Capital of: Volkhovsky District, Volkhovskoye Settlement Municipal Formation

Municipal status
  - Municipal district: Volkhovsky Municipal District
  - Urban settlement: Volkhovskoye Urban Settlement
  - Capital of: Volkhovsky Municipal District, Volkhovskoye Urban Settlement
- Time zone: UTC+3 (MSK)
- Postal codes: 187401–187404, 187406, 187409
- Dialing code: +7 81363
- OKTMO ID: 41609101001

Volkhov (Russian: Во́лхов) is an industrial town and the administrative center of Volkhovsky District in Leningrad Oblast, Russia, located on the river Volkhov 122 kilometers (76 mi) east of St. Petersburg. Population: 47,182 (2010 census); 46,596 (2002 census); 50,325 (1989 Soviet census).

It was previously known as Zvanka (until December 27, 1933), Volkhovstroy (until April 11, 1940).

== History ==
The town developed during the industrialization in the first half of the 20th century. The settlement of Zvanka (Званка) with a train depot was built here while the railway connecting St. Petersburg with Vologda was being constructed. It was a part of Novoladozhsky Uyezd of St. Petersburg Governorate. A second rail line running north of the station towards Murmansk was constructed in 1916, making the station an important railway junction. In 1918, construction of the Volkhov Hydroelectric Station (the first in the Soviet Union) started on this spot. In 1926, the power plant became operational and in 1932, the first Soviet aluminum plant was launched nearby.

On August 1, 1927, the uyezds were abolished and Volkhovsky District, with the administrative center in Zvanka, was established. The governorates were also abolished and the district became a part of Leningrad Okrug of Leningrad Oblast. On August 15, 1930, the okrugs were abolished as well and the districts were directly subordinated to the oblast. On December 27, 1933, the settlements serving the station, the dam, and the aluminum plant were merged with several adjacent villages to form the town of Volkhovstroy. On September 19, 1939, Volkhovstroy became a town of oblast significance and on April 11, 1940, it was renamed Volkhov. During World War II, between 1941 and 1944, the Volkhov River separated the Soviet and the German positions, and Volkhov was a battleground scene. The city itself was never occupied by German troops, and in December 1941 the advance of the German troops to Volkhov was stopped by the Red Army.

In 2010, the administrative structure of Leningrad Oblast was harmonized with its municipal structure and Volkhov became a town of district significance.

== Administrative and municipal status ==
Within the framework of administrative divisions, Volkhov serves as the administrative center of Volkhovsky District. As an administrative division, it is incorporated within Volkhovsky District as Volkhovskoye Settlement Municipal Formation. As a municipal division, Volkhovskoye Settlement Municipal Formation is incorporated within Volkhovsky Municipal District as Volkhovskoye Urban Settlement.

== Economy ==
=== Industry ===
The economy of Volkhov is essentially based on the Volkhov Hydroelectric Station and on the aluminum production plant.

=== Transportation ===
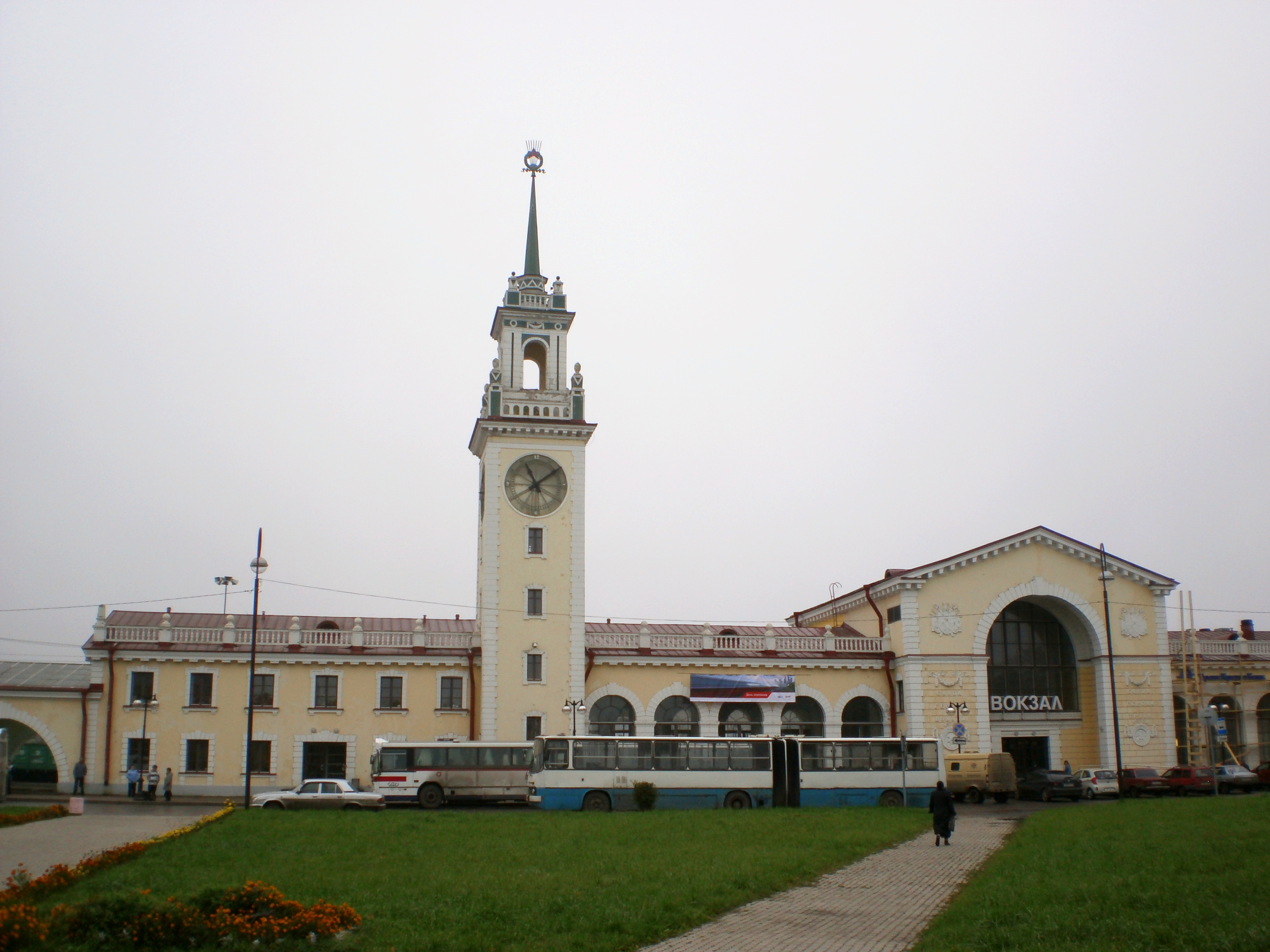
Volkhovstroy I railway station

Volkhov (railway stations Volkhovstroy I and Volkhovstroy II) is an important railway hub. One railway line connects in with St. Petersburg (Moskovsky Rail Terminal), and Volkhovstroy I is the terminal station of suburban trains from St. Petersburg. To the east, a railway line continues to Vologda via Tikhvin and Cherepovets. Another railway line passing through Volkhov connects Chudovo in the south and Lodeynoye Pole, Petrozavodsk, and ultimately Murmansk in the north. In Chudovo, it connects to railway between St. Petersburg and Moscow, so that all traffic between Moscow and Murmansk proceeds via Volkhovstroy.

Volkhov is located on the road connecting Kiselnya on the M18 Highway, which connects St. Petersburg and Murmansk, and Tikhvin, Cherepovets and Vologda. Volkhov is also connected by roads with Kirishi and with Novaya Ladoga. There are also local roads, with bus traffic originating from Volkhov.

The Volkhov River is navigable; however, there is no passenger navigation.

== Culture and recreation ==
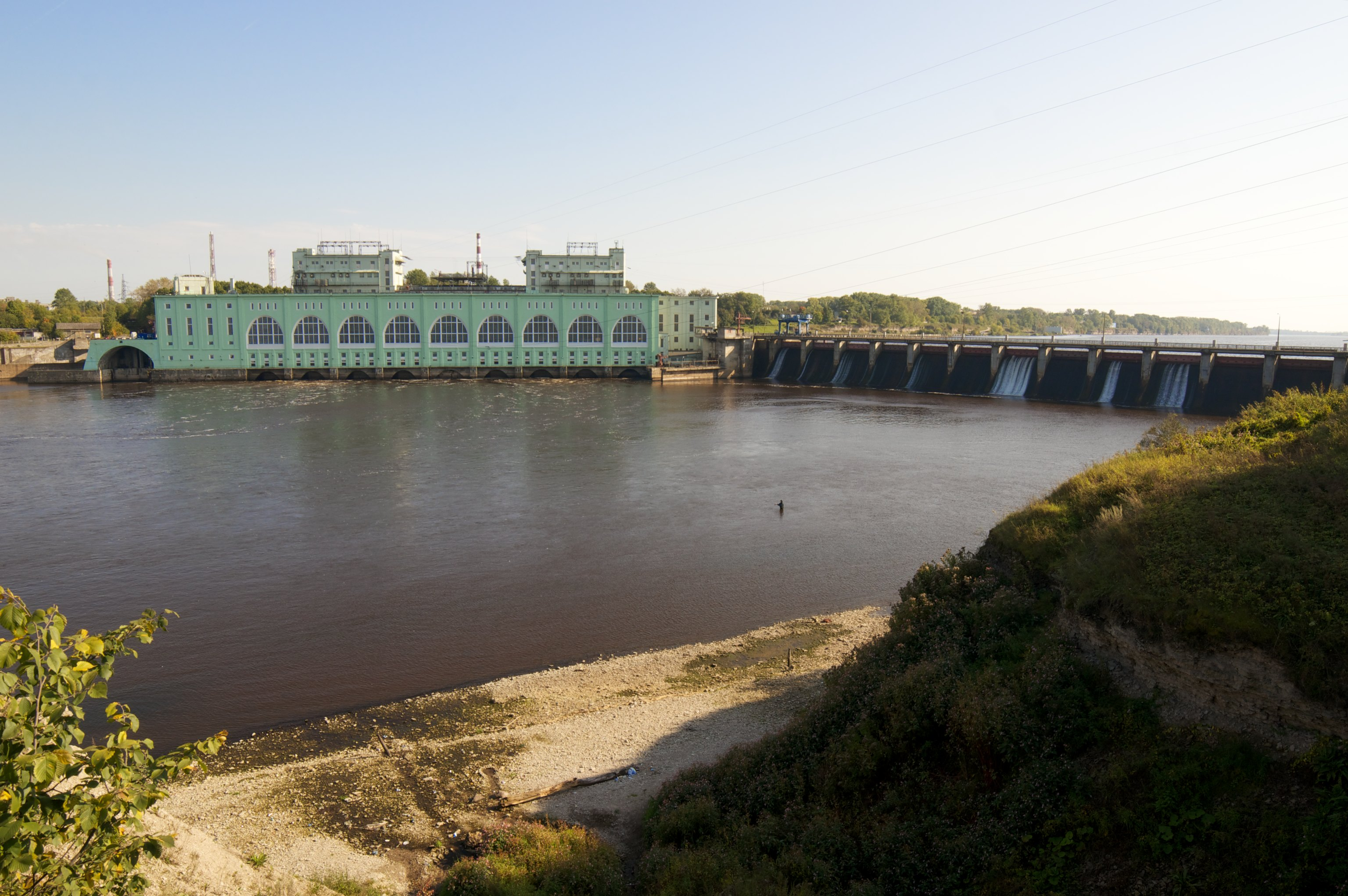
The dam of the Volkhov Hydroelectric Station

The district contains five cultural heritage monuments of federal significance and additionally seventeen objects classified as cultural and historical heritage of local significance. The federal monuments are the Volkhov Hydroelectric station, the monument to Genrikh Graftio, the head of the construction of the power plant, the first building of the aluminum plant, as well as the houses where Graftio and Boris Vedeneyev, who was also leading the power plant construction, lived.

== Notable people ==
- Boris Markarov, Olympic bronze medalist in water polo

== Twin towns and sister cities ==
Volkhov is twinned with:

- Mosjøen, Norway
- Järvenpää, Finland
- Grovskinka, Belarus
- Sundsvall, Sweden
