= TGC-1 =

- Native name: ТГК-1
- Company type: Public (PJSC)
- Traded as: MCX: TGKA
- Industry: Power generation
- Predecessor: Lenenergo; Kolenergo; Karelenergogeneratsiya
- Founded: 25/03/2005
- Founder: RAO UES
- Headquarters: Nevsky branch: Saint Petersburg; Karelsky branch: Petrozavodsk (Republic of Karelia); Kolsky branch: Murmashi (Murmansk Oblast), Saint Petersburg, Russia
- Area served: St. Petersburg, Leningrad Oblast, Murmansk Oblast, Republic of Karelia
- Key people: Vadim Vederchik (CEO)
- Products: electric power and heat
- Revenue: $1.23 billion (2020)
- Operating income: $15 million (2020)
- Net income: $114 million (2020)
- Total assets: $2.65 billion (2020)
- Total equity: $1.93 billion (2020)
- Parent: Gazprom Energoholding
- Website: www.tgc1.ru

TGC-1 (also referred as TGK-1; full name: Territorial generating company number 1; Russian: ТГК-1, Territorial’naya generiruyushchaya kompaniya No 1; traded as MCX: TGKA) is a regional power company operating in North-West Russia. The company has its headquarters in Saint Petersburg with branches in Karelia and Kola.

== History ==
The company was created in 2005 by the merger of Lenenergo, Kolenergo and Karelenergogeneratsiya power companies. Formation of the new company was announced on 1 March 2005 by Lenenergo, Kolenergo and RAO UES. The company was officially registered on 25 March 2005 and began to operate on 1 October 2005. The integration of predecessor companies was completed on 1 November 2006. The majority shareholder of this time was RAO UES.

== Operations ==
The company operates 52 thermal, hydro and co-generation stations in Saint Petersburg, Leningrad Oblast, Murmansk Oblast and Karelia. It has an installed generation capacity of 6,92 GW of electric power. In addition, TGC-1 is the major supplier of district heating in Saint Petersburg, Petrozavodsk, Murmansk, Apatity and Kirovsk with 13,49 thous GCal/hr of heating capacity.

The company operates through three branches – Nevsky, Karelsky and Kolsky. TGC-1 includes the following subsidiaries: JSC Murmanskaya CHPP (power supply of Murmansk and surrounding areas, share in authorised capital — 98.85%), JSC St. Petersburg Heating Grid (connection of heating networks in the area of operation of the company's CHPPs, share in authorised capital of 65.58%), as well as dependent companies of JSC HHC (transfer of heat energy from the Apatitskaya CHPP to consumers in the city of Kirovsk, with a share in authorised capital of 50%) and TGC-Service LLC (specialised repair company, share in authorised capital - 26%).

== Shareholders ==
The company's main shareholder is Gazprom through its power generation holding Gazprom Energoholding, which owns 51.79% of shares. Finnish Fortum owns 29.45% of shares. The company shares are traded at the Russian Trading System and the Moscow Interbank Currency Exchange.
